= 2015–16 DFB-Pokal Frauen =

Tournament details
- Country: Germany
- Teams: 57

Final positions
- Champions: VfL Wolfsburg
- Runners-up: SC Sand

Tournament statistics
- Matches played: 56
- Goals scored: 300 (5.36 per match)
- Top goal scorer(s): Nina Burger (8 goals)

The DFB-Pokal 2015–16 was the 36th season of the competition, which is considered Germany's second-most important title in women's football.

== Results ==
=== First round ===
The draw for the first round was held on 14 July 2015 and was divided into Northern and Southern sections. The top seven teams from the previous Bundesliga season received a bye to the second round.

22 August 2015	VfL Bochum	0–3	SV Werder Bremen	Bochum
15:00 CEST (UTC+02:00)		Report (in German)	Sanders 44'; Schiechtl 81'; Goddard 89'	Stadium: Athletics place at Rewirpowerstadion; Attendance: 150; Referee: Laura Duske (Leverkusen)

22 August 2015	Hallescher FC	0–6	Herforder SV	Halle (Saale)
15:00 CEST (UTC+02:00)		Report (in German)	Oduro 34'; Knipp 42'; Ronzetti 44'; Althof 54', 75', 89'	Stadium: Erdgas Sportpark; Attendance: 47; Referee: Miriam Schweinefuß (Rieder)

22 August 2015	DJK-VfL Billerbeck	3–2	FFV Leipzig	Billerbeck
16:30 CEST (UTC+02:00)	Haberecht 10', 83'; Schulte 88'	Report (in German)	Herrmann 8'; Ebersbach 35'	Stadium: Sportzentrum Helker Berg; Attendance: 210; Referee: Caroline Telahr (Essen)

22 August 2015	Karlsruher SC	1–4	FC Köln	Karlsruhe
18:00 CEST (UTC+02:00)	Bertsch 11'	Report (in German)	Pyko 6'; Munk 57'; Kalin 62'; Zielinski 90'	Stadium: Wildparkstadion; Attendance: 261; Referee: Melissa Joos (Leinfelden-Echterdingen)

23 August 2015	Blau-Weiß Hohen Neuendorf	1–5 (a.e.t.)	SV Meppen	Hohen Neuendorf
11:00 CEST (UTC+02:00)	Pantelmann 80'	Report (in German)	Weiss 12' (pen.), 112'; Anane 100', 119'; Berentzen 103'	Stadium: Sportanlage Niederheide; Attendance: 120; Referee: Sandra Blumenthal (Pritzwalk)

23 August 2015	FFC Gera	0–12	FSV Gütersloh	Gera
11:00 CEST (UTC+02:00)		Report (in German)	Grünheid 9', 13', 24', 47', 49', 73', 83'; Wolf 27', 57'; Jäger 51'; Aradini 78'; Hermes 82' (pen.)	Stadium: Sportareal Gera-Liebschwitz; Attendance: 136; Referee: Daniela Illing (Limbach-Oberfrohna)

23 August 2015	Magdeburger FFC	2–1	GSV Moers	Magdeburg
11:00 CEST (UTC+02:00)	Weiß 12'; Vogelhuber 57'	Report (in German)	Roth 75'	Stadium: Heinrich Germer Stadium; Attendance: 60; Referee: Christine Weigelt (Leipzig)

23 August 2015	SV Union Meppen	6–0	SFC Stern	Meppen
11:00 CEST (UTC+02:00)	Manthey 11'; Kappel 39'; Gößling 62', 72'; Brand 68'; Haar 77'	Report (in German)		Stadium: Waldstadion Meppen-Esterfeld; Attendance: 165; Referee: Marina Wozniak (Herne)

23 August 2015	SV Hegnach	4–1	FC Nürnberg	Waiblingen
11:00 CEST (UTC+02:00)	Reichel 11', 63'; Baumann 27'; Waldenmaier 90+1'	Report (in German)	Büttel 81'	Stadium: Sportplatz Hegnach; Attendance: 400; Referee: Silke Fritz (Abtsgmünd)

23 August 2015	SV Henstedt-Ulzburg	0–6	FF USV Jena	Henstedt-Ulzburg
14:00 CEST (UTC+02:00)		Report (in German)	Melhado 2'; Rudelic 7'; Voňková 16'; Landeka 53'; Arnold 59'; Hearn 61'	Stadium: Stadion am Schäferkampsweg; Attendance: 220; Referee: Susann Kunkel (Hamburg)

23 August 2015	TuRa Meldorf	1–0	FC Neubrandenburg	Meldorf
14:00 CEST (UTC+02:00)	Hamann 53'	Report (in German)		Stadium: Stadion an der Promenade; Attendance: 90; Referee: Jacqueline Herrmann (Hamburg)

23 August 2015	ATS Buntentor	2–6	Holstein Kiel	Bremen
14:00 CEST (UTC+02:00)	Luerssen 81'; Karpe 85'	Report (in German)	Auerochs 27'; Timmermann 39', 53'; Hild 68'; Weigel 84', 90'	Stadium: BSA Kuhhirten; Attendance: 50; Referee: Sina Diekmann (Lobach (Bevern))

23 August 2015	Bramfelder SV	2–3	BV Cloppenburg	Hamburg
14:00 CEST (UTC+02:00)	Albrecht 37', 87'	Report (in German)	Chandraratne 29'; Winczo 44'; Josten 77'	Stadium: Stadion Ellernreihe; Attendance: 196; Referee: Mirka Derlin (Bad Schwartau)

23 August 2015	FC Union Berlin	1–4	FC Lübars	Berlin
14:00 CEST (UTC+02:00)	Budde 65'	Report (in German)	Wojtecki 10'; Prvulovic 33'; Dey 49'; Korkmaz 84'	Stadium: Fritz Lesch Sportanlage; Attendance: 227; Referee: Inka Müller-Schmäh (Potsdam)

23 August 2015	FSV Lokomotive Dresden	0–5	FSV Babelsberg	Dresden
14:00 CEST (UTC+02:00)		Report (in German)	Helpa 39', 51'; Karaszewski 63', 90+1'; Gohlke 81'	Stadium: Sportpark Ostra Platz 6 Attendance: 200; Referee: Susann Dittmar (Dresden)

23 August 2015	FFC Niederkirchen	1–3	Bayer Leverkusen	Niederkirchen
14:00 CEST (UTC+02:00)	Arcangioli 55'	Report (in German)	Šundov 12'; Schwab 46'; T.Knaak 84'	Stadium: Sportgelände Nachtweide; Attendance: 210; Referee: Ines Appelmann (Alzey)

23 August 2015	TSV Crailsheim	2–5	SC Sand	Crailsheim
14:00 CEST (UTC+02:00)	Wich 49'; Nußelt 70'	Report (in German)	Savin 7'; Burger 12', 58', 71'; Meyer 22'	Stadium: Schönebürgstadion; Attendance: 150; Referee: Karoline Wacker (Marbach am Neckar)

23 August 2015	Fortuna Köln	1–6	FC Saarbrücken	Cologne
14:00 CEST (UTC+02:00)	Pereira 39'	Report (in German)	Reiter 31'; Mayer 34', 44', 68'; McKibben 38'; Leykauf 65'	Stadium: Südstadion; Attendance: 254; Referee: Kathrin Heimann (Gladbeck)

23 August 2015	SC Siegelbach	2–4	Borussia Mönchengladbach	Kaiserslautern
14:00 CEST (UTC+02:00)	Mey 22', 34'	Report (in German)	Pfeiffer 4'; Müller 42', 45'; Kalkan 88'	Stadium: Sportplatz Siegelbach; Attendance: 400; Referee: Samira Bologna (Seelbach)

23 August 2015	SV Dirmingen	3–3 (a.e.t.) (2–4 p)	TuS Issel	Eppelborn
14:00 CEST (UTC+02:00)	Morche 14', 64'; Lambert 18'	Report (in German)	Ballmann 12'; Kohr 26'; Mayer 30'	Stadium: Sportplatz Dirmingen; Attendance: 240; Referee: Fabienne Michel (Gau-Odernheim)
	Penalties
	?? (penalty missed); Klein (penalty scored); Morche (penalty scored) ?? (penalty missed)		(penalty scored) Wagner; (penalty scored) Kohr; (penalty scored) Umbach; (penalty scored) Burg

23 August 2015	TSG Neu-Isenburg	0–5	PSV Freiburg	Neu-Isenburg
14:00 CEST (UTC+02:00)		Report (in German)	Klein 5'; Pahl 20'; Meier 65'; Hazel 68', 78'	Stadium: Sportplatz Neu-Isenburg; Attendance: 385; Referee: Sonja Kuttelwascher (Ilvesheim)

23 August 2015	TSV Schott	1–3	MSV Duisburg	Mainz
14:00 CEST (UTC+02:00)	Freigang 14'	Report (in German)	Luís 32'; Nati 35', 45+1'	Stadium: Otto-Schott-Sportzentrum; Attendance: 250; Referee: Hanna Schlemmer (Nußbach)

23 August 2015	FSV Hessen Wetzlar	3–0	SV Weinberg	Wetzlar
14:00 CEST (UTC+02:00)	Konhäuser 28', 85', 88'	Report (in German)		Stadium: Stadion Wetzlar; Attendance: 180; Referee: Sabine Stadler (Fulda)

23 August 2015	VfL Sindelfingen	3–0	ETSV Würzburg	Sindelfingen
14:00 CEST (UTC+02:00)	Moraitou 20'; Selensky 22'; Grimm 39'	Report (in German)		Stadium: Floschenstadion; Attendance: 76; Referee: Christine Baitinger (Friesenheim)

23 August 2015	FFC Montabaur	1–6	Alemannia Aachen	Montabaur
14:00 CEST (UTC+02:00)	Zimmermann 33' (pen.)	Report (in German)	Bemmelen 12', 20', 41'; Zsolt 25'; Bartoschek 37'; Tsutsumi 68'	Stadium: Sportplatz Montabaur-Eschelbach; Attendance: 100; Referee: Nadine Westerhoff (Bochum)

=== Second round ===
The draw for the second round took place on 27 August 2015. The 25 teams which advanced from the first round were joined by the top seven teams from the last Bundesliga season (FC Bayern Munich, VfL Wolfsburg, FFC Frankfurt, FFC Turbine Potsdam, SGS Essen, TSG Hoffenheim and SC Freiburg).

26 September 2015	PSV Freiburg	0–14	FFC Frankfurt	Freiburg
14:00 CEST (UTC+02:00)		Report (in German)	Garefrekes 8', 10', 39', 67'; Prießen 19', 58' van Egmond 28', 50' (pen.); Laudehr 32'; Linden 37'; Ōgimi 47', 71', 83'; Groenen 89'	Stadium: Sportanlage PSV Freiburg; Attendance: 600; Referee: Karoline Wacker (Marbach am Neckar)

26 September 2015	SV Hegnach	3–1	TuS Issel	Waiblingen
15:00 CEST (UTC+02:00)	Mayer 53'; Baumann 55'; Bonuso 71'	Report (in German)	Ballmann 31' (pen.)	Stadium: Sportplatz Hegnach; Attendance: 400; Referee: Alessa Plass (Augsburg)

26 September 2015	DJK-VfL Billerbeck	0–19	VfL Wolfsburg	Billerbeck
16:00 CEST (UTC+02:00)		Report (in German)	Faißt 21'; Dickenmann 24', 28', 39'; Jensen 26', 60', 67', 86'; Goeßling 37', 42'; Jakabfi 47', 54', 70', 74', 88'; Popp 64', 79', 81'; Kerschowski 78'	Stadium: Sportzentrum Helker Berg; Attendance: 2200; Referee: Laura Duske (Leverkusen)

27 September 2015	Alemannia Aachen	0–9	SC Sand	Aachen
11:00 CEST (UTC+02:00)		Report (in German)	Möthrath 4' (o.g.); Burger 13', 24'; Savin 18'; Meyer 73' van Bonn 81', 87' (pen.), 90'; Stoller 83'	Stadium: Stadion West; Attendance: 125; Referee: Franziska Erkes (Korschenbroich)

27 September 2015	Borussia Mönchengladbach	1–4	FC Köln	Mönchengladbach
11:00 CEST (UTC+02:00)	Pfeiffer 24'	Report (in German)	Munk 22'; Gerhardt 30'; Zielinski 43'; Ehegötz 64'	Stadium: Grenzlandstadion; Attendance: 210; Referee: Kathrin Heimann (Gladbeck)

27 September 2015	BV Cloppenburg	1–2	FF USV Jena	Cloppenburg
13:00 CEST (UTC+02:00)	McCarthy 81'	Report (in German)	van den Heiligenberg 21'; Hausicke 70'	Stadium: TimePartner Arena; Attendance: 283; Referee: Imke Lohmeyer (Holtland)

27 September 2015	TuRa Meldorf	0–8	SV Werder Bremen	Meldorf
14:00 CEST (UTC+02:00)		Report (in German)	König 6', 26'; Wallenhorst 16'; Ulbrich 44', 68'; Volkmer 55'; Schiechtl 61'; Eta 81'	Stadium: Stadion an der Promenade; Attendance: 90; Referee: Svenja Pleuß (Schwarme)

27 September 2015	Holstein Kiel	0–11	FFC Turbine Potsdam	Kiel
14:00 CEST (UTC+02:00)		Report (in German)	Huth 1', 25', 42', 52', 59', 89'; Mauro 36', 50'; Schmidt 65'; Draws 69' (pen.); Rauch 75'	Stadium: Stadion Waldwiese; Attendance: 750; Referee: Susann Kunkel (Hamburg)

27 September 2015	SV Union Meppen	0–9	SGS Essen	Meppen
14:00 CEST (UTC+02:00)		Report (in German)	Hartmann 11', 26', 78', 87'; Schüller 15'; Doorsoun 29', 49'; Brüggemann 84'; Freutel 89'	Stadium: Waldstadion Meppen-Esterfeld; Attendance: 188; Referee: Nadine Westerhoff (Bochum)

27 September 2015	Magdeburger FFC	1–4	Herforder SV	Magdeburg
14:00 CEST (UTC+02:00)	Bartke 73'	Report (in German)	Knipp 42', 79', 87' (pen.); Ronzetti 55'	Stadium: Heinrich Germer Stadium; Attendance: 90; Referee: Saskia Geweke (Holle)

27 September 2015	FSV Gütersloh	2–4	SV Meppen	Rheda-Wiedenbrück
14:00 CEST (UTC+02:00)	Pollmann 53' (pen.); Wolf 62'	Report (in German)	Winters 27'; Gieseke 35', 38'; Berentzen 90+2'	Stadium: Tönnies Arena; Attendance: 110; Referee: Sina Diekmann (Lobach (Bevern))

27 September 2015	FSV Babelsberg	0–4	FC Lübars	Potsdam
14:00 CEST (UTC+02:00)		Report (in German)	Csiszár 52'; Rácz 71', 86'; Schauss 80' (o.g.)	Stadium: Sportanlage in der Rudolf-Breitscheid-Straße; Attendance: 250; Referee: Sandra Stolz (Pritzwalk)

27 September 2015	MSV Duisburg	0–3	FC Bayern Munich	Duisburg
14:00 CEST (UTC+02:00)		Report (in German)	Däbritz 46'; Wenninger 54'; Beckmann 79'	Stadium: PCC-Stadion; Attendance: 753; Referee: Marina Wozniak (Herne)

27 September 2015	VfL Sindelfingen	0–6	SC Freiburg	Sindelfingen
14:00 CEST (UTC+02:00)		Report (in German)	Magull 26', 50'; Kayikci 29'; Starke 41'; Streng 75'; Petermann 88'	Stadium: Floschenstadion; Attendance: 135; Referee: Fabienne Michel (Gau-Odernheim)

27 September 2015	FC Saarbrücken	0–5	TSG Hoffenheim	Saarbrücken
15:30 CEST (UTC+02:00)		Report (in German)	Moser 20', 87'; Billa 27'; Bürger 77'; Chojnowski 80'	Stadium: Kieselhumes; Attendance: 250; Referee: Christine Baitinger (Friesenheim)

27 September 2015	FSV Hessen Wetzlar	0–2	Bayer Leverkusen	Wetzlar
18:00 CEST (UTC+02:00)		Report (in German)	Petzelberger 36'; Beck 85'	Stadium: Stadion Wetzlar; Attendance: 400; Referee: Katrin Rafalski (Baunatal)

=== Round of 16 ===
The draw for the Round of 16 was held on 10 October 2015.

7 November 2015	FC Köln	0–4	FF USV Jena	Cologne
11:00 CET (UTC+01:00)		Report (in German)	Hearn 17'; Voňková 57'; Landeka 64'; Martin 66'	Stadium: Franz-Kremer-Stadion; Attendance: 215; Referee: Marina Wozniak (Herne)

7 November 2015	VfL Wolfsburg	2–1	SGS Essen	Wolfsburg
13:00 CET (UTC+01:00)	Popp 22'; Pajor 85'	Report (in German)	Ando 83'	Stadium: VfL-Stadion am Elsterweg; Attendance: 718; Referee: Inka Müller-Schmäh (Potsdam)

7 November 2015	SV Hegnach	2–3	FC Lübars	Waiblingen
13:00 CET (UTC+01:00)	Schindler 26'; Schmidt 86'	Report (in German)	Wojtecki 12'; Csiszár 49'; Niciński 69'	Stadium: Sportplatz Hegnach; Attendance: 600; Referee: Angelika Söder (Ingolstadt)

7 November 2015	FFC Turbine Potsdam	4–0	TSG Hoffenheim	Potsdam
13:00 CET (UTC+01:00)	Huth 37'; Makanza 40', 46'; Rauch 48'	Report (in German)		Stadium: Karl-Liebknecht-Stadion; Attendance: 1,420; Referee: Daniela Illing (Limbach-Oberfrohna)

8 November 2015	Herforder SV	3–4 (a.e.t.)	SC Sand	Herford
11:00 CET (UTC+01:00)	Knipp 50'; Oduro 90'; Ronzetti 118'	Report (in German)	Damnjanović 26', 31', 107'; Škorvánková 114'	Stadium: Friedrich-Ludwig-Jahn-Stadion; Attendance: 164; Referee: Imke Lohmeyer (Holtland)

8 November 2015	FC Bayern Munich	2–0	FFC Frankfurt	Munich
13:15 CET (UTC+01:00)	Miedema 14'; Behringer 39'	Report (in German)		Stadium: Grünwalder Stadion; Attendance: 1,760; Referee: Marija Kurtes (Düsseldorf)

8 November 2015	SV Meppen	1–3	SV Werder Bremen	Meppen
14:00 CET (UTC+01:00)	Gieseke 49'	Report (in German)	Sanders 34', 70'; Wallenhorst 66'	Stadium: Hänsch-Arena; Attendance: 511; Referee: Kathrin Heimann (Gladbeck)

8 November 2015	SC Freiburg	4–0	Bayer Leverkusen	Freiburg
14:00 CET (UTC+01:00)	Kayikci 13'; Schöne 37'; Petermann 47'; Gwinn 66'	Report (in German)		Stadium: Möslestadion; Attendance: 349; Referee: Karoline Wacker (Marbach am Neckar)

=== Quarterfinals ===
The quarterfinals draw took place on 15 November 2015. FC Lübars is the only remaining team not playing in the Bundesliga, being part of the 2. Bundesliga.

9 December 2015
13:00 CET (UTC+01:00)

FF USV Jena	1–4	SC Sand
Rudelic 62'	Report (in German)	Burger 12', 58', 68'; Van Bonn 72'

Ernst-Abbe-Sportfeld, Jena
Attendance: 232
Referee: Riem Hussein (Bad Harzburg)

9 December 2015
18:00 CET (UTC+01:00)

SV Werder Bremen	0–3 (a.e.t.)	FC Bayern Munich
	Report (in German)	Lewandowski 97'; Miedema 112', 114'

Weserstadion complex (field 11), Bremen
Attendance: 714
Referee: Mirka Derlin (Bad Schwartau)

9 December 2015
18:00 CET (UTC+01:00)

FC Lübars	0–1	SC Freiburg
	Report (in German)	Kayikci 80'

Stadion Finsterwalder Straße, Berlin
Attendance: 158
Referee: Christine Weigelt (Leipzig)

9 December 2015
18:00 CET (UTC+01:00)

FFC Turbine Potsdam	0–3	VfL Wolfsburg
	Report (in German)	Hansen 33', 57'; Fischer 75'

Karl-Liebknecht-Stadion, Potsdam
Attendance: 1,580
Referee: Daniela Illing (Limbach-Oberfrohna)

=== Semifinals ===
The semifinals draw took place on 16 December 2015.

3 April 2016
12:00 CEST (UTC+02:00)

SC Sand	2–1	FC Bayern Munich
Damnjanović 60'; Van Bonn 83'	Report (in German)	Miedema 34'

Kühnmatt-Stadion, Willstätt
Attendance: 2,215
Referee: Kathrin Heimann (Gladbeck)

3 April 2016
14:00 CEST (UTC+02:00)

VfL Wolfsburg	2–1	SC Freiburg
Popp 5'; Peter 78'	Report (in German)	Gwinn 88'

AOK Stadion, Wolfsburg
Attendance: 1,719
Referee: Susann Kunkel (Hamburg)

=== Final ===
21 May 2016
15:00 CEST (UTC+02:00)

SC Sand	1–2	VfL Wolfsburg
Damnjanović 27'	Report (in German)	Jakabfi 7', 80'

RheinEnergieStadion, Cologne
Attendance: 16,542
Referee: Angelika Söder (Ingolstadt)

Sand	Wolfsburg

GK	25	(Germany) Kristina Kober
RB	17	(Germany) Claire Savin	(substituted off) 85'
CB	8	(Germany) Julia Zirnstein
CB	26	(Germany) Laura Vetterlein
LB	3	(Denmark) Cecilie Sandvej
CM	7	(Germany) Anne van Bonn	(substituted off) 90+1'
CM	4	(United States) Chioma Igwe (c)
RW	18	(Slovakia) Dominika Škorvánková
LW	20	(Slovakia) Jana Vojteková
CF	19	(Austria) Nina Burger
CF	14	(Serbia) Jovana Damnjanović	(substituted off) 64'
Substitutes:
GK	12	(Slovakia) Mária Korenčiová
MF	11	(Germany) Angela Migliazza	(substituted in) 90+1'
MF	21	(Germany) Julia Schneider
MF	22	(Germany) Sinah Amann
MF	23	(Switzerland) Isabelle Meyer	(substituted in) 85'
FW	6	(Germany) Sabine Stoller
FW	9	(Germany) Christine Veth	(substituted in) 64'
Manager:
Alexander Fischinger

GK	1	(Germany) Almuth Schult
RB	21	(Switzerland) Lara Dickenmann
CB	4	(Sweden) Nilla Fischer (c)
CB	24	(Germany) Joelle Wedemeyer
LB	8	(Germany) Babett Peter
CM	18	(Switzerland) Vanessa Bernauer	(yellow card) 30'	(substituted off) 46'
CM	28	(Germany) Lena Goeßling
RW	3	(Hungary) Zsanett Jakabfi		(substituted off) 82'
AM	19	(Switzerland) Ramona Bachmann		(substituted off) 57'
LW	27	(Germany) Isabel Kerschowski
CF	11	(Germany) Alexandra Popp
Substitutes:
GK	28	(Germany) Merle Frohms
DF	2	(Germany) Luisa Wensing
DF	20	(Germany) Stephanie Bunte
MF	9	(Germany) Anna Blässe		(substituted in) 57'
MF	30	(France) Élise Bussaglia		(substituted in) 46'
FW	10	(Belgium) Tessa Wullaert		(substituted in) 82'
FW	17	(Poland) Ewa Pajor
Manager:
Ralf Kellermann

Assistant referees:
Susann Kunkel (Hamburg)
Annett Unterbeck (Berlin)
Fourth official:
Daniela Illing (Limbach-Oberfrohna)

Match rules

- 90 minutes.
- 30 minutes of extra time if necessary.
- Penalty shoot-out if scores still level.
- Seven named substitutes, of which up to three may be used.

== Topscorers ==
Rank	Player	Team	Goals
1	(Austria) Nina Burger	SC Sand	8
2	(Germany) Sarah Grünheid	FSV Gütersloh 2009	7
2	(Germany) Svenja Huth	1. FFC Turbine Potsdam	7
2	(Hungary) Zsanett Jakabfi	VfL Wolfsburg	7
5	(Germany) Anne van Bonn	SC Sand	5
5	(Serbia) Jovana Damnjanović	SC Sand	5
5	(Germany) Isabelle Knipp	Herforder SV	5
5	(Germany) Alexandra Popp	VfL Wolfsburg	5
9	(Germany) Kerstin Garefrekes	1. FFC Frankfurt	4
9	(Germany) Charline Hartmann	SGS Essen	4
9	(Norway) Synne Jensen	VfL Wolfsburg	4
9	(Netherlands) Vivianne Miedema	FC Bayern Munich	4
