= List of German women's football transfers summer 2015 =

This is a list of German women's football transfers in the summer transfer window 2015 by club. Frauen Bundesliga clubs are listed according to the 2014-15 season table.

== Bundesliga ==
=== In ===
- As of 23 October 2015. Source: Framba

Team	Goalkeepers	Defender	Midfielders	Forwards
Bayern Munich			(Spain) Boquete (Frankfurt); Däbritz (Freiburg) (United States) Kristie Mewis (Breakers); Rolser (Liverpool)	(Scotland) Evans (Turbine)
VfL Wolfsburg			(France) Bussaglia (Lyon) (Switzerland) Dickenmann (Lyon) (Poland) Pajor (Medyk)	(Switzerland) Bachmann (Rosengård) (Norway) Jensen (Kolbotn) (Belgium) Wullaert (Standard)
FFC Frankfurt		(United States) Clark (Freiburg)	(Australia) van Egmond (Jets) (Belgium) Groenen (Chelsea); Linden (Leverkusen); Möller (Turbine) (Canada) Schmidt (free agent)	(Japan) Ōgimi (Wolfsburg); Panfil (Leverkusen)
Turbine Potsdam	Schmitz (Leverkusen)	Schmidt (Frankfurt) (Croatia) Scurich (Sand)	Hanebeck (Sand) (Australia) Kellond-Knight (Roar) (Poland) Siwińska (Lübars)	Huth (Frankfurt) (France) Makanza (Montpellier) (Italy) Mauro (Sand)
SGS Essen		Brüggemann (Cloppenburg)	(Japan) Ando (free agent)	Nesse (Herford)
TSG Hoffenheim	Abt (Herford)	Hartig (Bayern II) ^{1} Specht (Bayern II)	Howard (Knights)	(Austria) Billa (St. Pölten)
Freiburg		Jaser (Wolfpack)	Gwinn (Weingarten); Magull (Wolfsburg) ^{1} Minge (Wangen); Schiewe (Jena); Wagner (Wolfsburg) (Switzerland) Zehnder (Zürich)	(Austria) Makas (St. Pölten)
FF Jena		(Puerto Rico) Cruz (Magdeburg) (Canada) Melhado (Herford) (Czech Republic) Sedláčková (Lübars)	(United States) Martin (Knights) (Portugal) Silva (Duisburg)	(Netherlands) van den Heiligenberg (Ajax) (Czech Republic) Voňková (Duisburg)
Bayer Leverkusen	(Italy) Schroffenegger (Bayern)	Kempe (Gütersloh); Krahn (PSG)	Schwanekamp (Gütersloh)	(Croatia) Šundov (Duisburg)
SC Sand	Kober (Hoffenheim)	Vetterlein (Wolfsburg) (Slovakia) Vojteková (Neulengbach)	(United States) Igwe (Freiburg); Meier (Freiburg); Savin (Freiburg) (Slovakia) Škorvánková (Neulengbach)	(Austria) Burger (Neulengbach) (Serbia) Damnjanović (Wolfsburg); Stoller (Hoffenheim)
Köln	(Italy) Giuliani (Herford)	(Austria) Kirchberger (Duisburg)	Gosch (Bochum)	Ehegötz (Gütersloh) (Canada) Julien (Jena)
Werder Bremen	Martens (Herford); Weinert (Leipzig)	(Austria) Maierhofer (St. Pölten) (Hungary) Tóth (Lübars)		El-Kassem (Leverkusen)

^{1} On loan

=== Out ===
- As of 11 October 2015. Source: Framba
- Includes players that have played at least one game in the Bundesliga, or in the 2. Bundesliga if the team is just promoted. Source: Soccerway

Team	Goalkeepers	Defender	Midfielders	Forwards
Bayern Munich	(Italy) Schroffenegger (Leverkusen)		(Iceland) Brynjarsdóttir (free agent)	
Wolfsburg		Vetterlein (Sand)	Magull (Freiburg) ^{2} Odebrecht (retired); Wagner (Freiburg)	(Serbia) Damnjanović (Sand); Müller (retired) (Japan) Ōgimi (Frankfurt)
FFC Frankfurt	Hanemann (Mainz)	Peil (free agent); Schmidt (Turbine)	(Japan) Ando (free agent) (Spain) Boquete (Bayern) (Wales) Fishlock (Reign) ^{2} Kulig (free agent); Reinhardt (free agent)	Huth (Turbine); Jurado (Penn State); Šašić (retired)
Turbine Potsdam	Sarholz (Babelsberg) (China) Wang (Lyon)	(Denmark) Pedersen (Hjørring)	Bremer (Lyon) (United States) Mercik (free agent); Möller (Frankfurt) (United States) Wells (retired); Zietz (retired)	(North Macedonia) Andonova (Rosengård) (Equatorial Guinea) Añonma (Thorns) (United States) Deines (retired) (Scotland) Evans (Bayern)
SGS Essen	Närdemann (USA scholarship)	(Netherlands) Janssen (Arsenal); Leiding (career break)		Wolf (Gütersloh)
TSG Hoffenheim	Kober (Sand)			Stoller (Sand)
Freiburg		(United States) Clark (Frankfurt)	Däbritz (Bayern) (United States) Igwe (Sand); Meier (Sand); Savin (Sand)	
FF Jena		Brosius (retired); Löser (SV Jena)	Beil (free agent); Frank (Leipzig); Hartmann (free agent) (Switzerland) Keller (Zürich); Schiewe (Freiburg)	(Canada) Julien (Köln); Schmutzler (retired)
Bayer Leverkusen	Schmitz (Turbine)	Claassen (career break); Kleiner (free agent)	Linden (Frankfurt)	El-Kassem (Werder); Panfil (Frankfurt)
SC Sand	(United States) Lofton-Malachi (retired)	(United States) St. Martin (free agent) (Canada) McCarthy (Cloppenburg) (Croatia) Scurich (Turbine)	(France) Haag (retired); Hanebeck (Turbine); Wagner (Crailsheim)	(Canada) Busque (Comets); Höfflin (retired) (Italy) Mauro (Turbine) (Albania) Velaj (free agent)
Köln	(Denmark) Lykke-Petersen (Odense)	Frommont (Mönchengladbach); Rech (retired)		Windmüller (Duisburg II)
Werder Bremen	Doll (free agent)		Treml (Jena II)	Volkmer (unknown); William (retired)

- ^{1} On loan
- ^{2} Back from loan
