= 2011–12 DFB-Pokal Frauen =

Tournament details
- Country: Germany
- Teams: 55

Final positions
- Champions: FC Bayern Munich
- Runners-up: 1. FFC Frankfurt

Tournament statistics
- Matches played: 54
- Goals scored: 272 (5.04 per match)
- Top goal scorer: Alexandra Popp (10 goals)

The DFB-Pokal 2011–12 was the 32nd season of the cup competition, Germany's second-most important title in women's football.

== Participating clubs ==
The following teams were qualified for the DFB-Pokal:

BUNDESLIGA all clubs of 2010–11	2. BUNDESLIGA; 19 of 24 clubs of 2010–11 (Note: Being second teams FCR 2001 Duisburg II, FFC Frankfurt II, Hamburg II, Bayern Munich II, and Turbine Potsdam II may not compete in the cup.)	REGIONALLIGA; 3 of 5 clubs promoted in 2010–11 (Note: SC 07 Bad Neuenahr II and FF USV Jena II as winners of divisions South-west and North-east may not compete in the cup.)	REGIONAL CUPS; Winners of 2010–11
SC 07 Bad Neuenahr FCR 2001 Duisburg SG Essen-Schönebeck: 1. FFC Frankfurt; Hamburger SV Herforder SC FF USV Jena Bayer 04 Leverkusen FC Bayern Munich: 1. FFC Turbine Potsdam; 1. FC Saarbrücken; VfL Wolfsburg	1. FC Lokomotive Leipzig; 1. FC Lübars; Werder Bremen SV Victoria Gersten FFC Oldesloe 2000 FSV Gütersloh 2009 Magdeburger FFC BV Cloppenburg Tennis Borussia Berlin Holstein Kiel SC Freiburg: 1. FC Köln; 1899 Hoffenheim TSV Crailsheim VfL Sindelfingen FFC Niederkirchen FV Löchgau SC Sand FFC Recklinghausen	North: Mellendorfer TV West: Borussia Mönchengladbach South: ETSV Würzburg	Schleswig-Holstein: FC Riepsdorf; Hamburg: SV Wilhelmsburg; Bremen: TS Woltmershausen; Lower Saxony: TSG Burg Gretesch; Mecklenburg-Vorpommern: 1. FC Neubrandenburg 04; Brandenburg: Blau-Weiß Beelitz; Berlin: Blau-Weiß Hohen Neuendorf; Saxony-Anhalt: Hallescher FC; Saxony: Heidenauer SV (Note: 1. FC Lokomotive Leipzig II won the cup but is not allowed to enter DFB Cup); Thuringia: 1. FFV Erfurt; Middle Rhine: VfL Kommern; Lower Rhine: GSV Moers (Note: Borussia Mönchengladbach won the cup, but is qualified as a team that achieved promotion to the 2. Bundesliga.); Westphalia: VfL Bochum; Rhineland: TuS Issel (Note: SC 07 Bad Neuenahr II won the cup but is not allowed to enter DFB Cup); South West: SV Rot-Weiß Göcklingen; Saarland: SV Bardenbach; Hesse: TSV Jahn Calden; Württemberg: TB Neckarhausen (Note: VfL Sindelfingen II won the cup but is not allowed to enter DFB Cup); Baden: TSV Neckerau; South Baden: Hegauer FV; Bavaria: SV 67 Weinberg (Note: ETSV Würzburg won the cup but is qualified as a team that achieved promotion to the 2. Bundesliga.)

== Results ==
=== Round 1 ===
The draw for the first round was held on 14 July 2011. The nine best clubs of the previous Bundesliga season, 1. FFC Turbine Potsdam, 1. FFC Frankfurt, FCR 2001 Duisburg, Hamburger SV, FC Bayern München, SC 07 Bad Neuenahr, VfL Wolfsburg, Bayer 04 Leverkusen and SG Essen-Schönebeck were awarded byes for the first round. Starting times were terminated on 25 July 2011. The three Bundesliga clubs moved on.

13 August 2011
TS Wolmertshausen	0–14	BV Cloppenburg
Blau Weiß Beelitz	1–7	FFC Oldesloe
TSV Jahn Calden	4–1	1 . FC Neubrandenburg
FC Riepsdorf	0–1	Werder Bremen
SV Bardenbach	0–6	SC Freiburg
14 August 2011
GSV Moers	0–5	SC Sand
VfL Bochum	1–5	Niederkirchen
Heidenauer SV	0–13	Herforder SV
TB Neckarhausen	0–9	Bor. Mönchengladbach
1. FFV Erfurt	1–5	1. FC Lok. Leipzig
Tennis Borussia Berlin	1–10	FF USV Jena
TSG Burg Gretesch	0–1	Magdeburger FFC
Holstein Kiel	0–1	SV Meppen
SV BW H. Neuendorf	3–2	Mellendorfer TV
Hallescher FC	2–5	FSV Gütersloh 2009
SV Wilhelmsburg	1–11	1. FC Lübars
VfL Kommern	2–1 a.e.t.	1. FC Köln
FFC Recklinghausen	1–3	ETSV Würzburg
Hegauer FV	2–4	1. FC Saarbrücken
TuS Issel	0–3	FV Löchgau
TSV Neckarau	0–2	TSV Crailsheim
SV Weinberg	0–4	1899 Hoffenheim
SV RW Göcklingen	0–3	VfL Sindelfingen

=== Round of 32 ===
The draw for the second round was held on 18 August 2011. Games were terminated on 30 August 2011.

9 September 2011
SV Meppen	0–1 a.e.t.	Werder Bremen
10 September 2011
FF USV Jena	3–2 a.e.t.	BV Cloppenburg
1. FC Saarbrücken	0–1	Bayern Munich
11 September 2011
FSV Gütersloh 2009	4–2	1. FC Lübars
VfL Sindelfingen	8–0	Bor. Mönchengladbach
TSV Jahn Calden	abandoned^{1}	1. FC Lok. Leipzig
SC Sand	0–2	FCR Duisburg
SV BW H. Neuendorf	0–3	Hamburg
Herforder SV	4–1	FFC Oldesloe
Turbine Potsdam	5–0	Essen-Schönebeck
Magdeburger FFC	0–5	Wolfsburg
VfL Kommern	0–6	FFC Frankfurt
Bayer Leverkusen	0–1	Bad Neuenahr
TSV Crailsheim	4–5 a.e.t.	1899 Hoffenheim
Niederkirchen	0–1	FV Löchgau
SC Freiburg	6–3	ETSV Würzburg
17 September 2011
TSV Jahn Calden	0–5	1. FC Lok. Leipzig

1. The match Jahn Calden vs Leipzig was abandoned in the 69th minute due to bad weather. Leipzig was leading 1–0. It was replayed on 17 September 2011.

=== Round of 16 ===
The draw for the round of 16 was held on 17 September 2011. The matches were played on 30 October 2011.

30 October 2011
1. FC Lok. Leipzig	6–1	FV Löchgau
1. FFC Frankfurt	1–0	VfL Wolfsburg
Hamburger SV	2–0	SC Freiburg
Turbine Potsdam	4–1	VfL Sindelfingen
FC Bayern München	2–0 a.e.t.	FF USV Jena
SC 07 Bad Neuenahr	3–1	1899 Hoffenheim
FSV Gütersloh 2009	2–1 a.e.t.	Werder Bremen
FCR 2001 Duisburg	10–0	Herforder SV

=== Quarterfinals ===
The quarterfinals were held on 3 and 4 December 2011. FSV Gütersloh 2009 was the sole remaining second league team. The matches were played on 3 and 4 December 2011.

3 December 2011
Hamburger SV	3–2	1. FC Lokomotive Leipzig
4 December 2011
1. FFC Frankfurt	5–1	1. FFC Turbine Potsdam
SC 07 Bad Neuenahr	0–0 (5–6 pen)	FC Bayern München
FSV Gütersloh 2009	0–7	FCR 2001 Duisburg

=== Semifinals ===
The semifinals were drawn on 21 December 2011. And dated on 15 February 2012.

8 April 2012
13:00

1. FFC Frankfurt	2 – 2 (a.e.t.)	FCR 2001 Duisburg
Garefrekes 8'; Lewandowski 80'	Report	Islacker 26'; Popp 69'
Penalties
Behringer (penalty scored); Crnogorčević (penalty missed); Weber (penalty scored); Bajramaj (penalty scored); Kumagai (penalty scored); Bartusiak (penalty scored)	5 – 4	(penalty scored) Islacker; (penalty scored) Martens; (penalty scored) Cengiz; (penalty scored) Popp; (penalty missed) Krahn; (penalty missed) Bresonik

Stadion am Brentanobad, Frankfurt
Attendance: 2,189
Referee: Riem Hussein

9 April 2012
13:00

FC Bayern Munich	5 – 2	Hamburger SV
Cross 2', 7'; Hagen 27', 45', 72'	Report	Bagehorn 5'; Kameraj 90'

Sportpark Aschheim, Munich
Attendance: 1,000
Referee: Monique Elsner

=== Final ===
The final was held on May 12.

12 May 2012

1. FFC Frankfurt	0 – 2	FC Bayern Munich
	Report	Hagen 63'; Rudelic 90+1'

RheinEnergieStadion, Cologne
Referee: Inka Müller-Schmäh

Frankfurt	Munich

FRANKFURT:
GK	26	(Germany) Desirée Schumann
RB	12	(Germany) Meike Weber
CB	25	(Germany) Saskia Bartusiak
CB	2	(United States) Gina Lewandowski
LB	23	(New Zealand) Ria Percival
CM	10	(Germany) Dzsenifer Marozsán
CM	28	(Germany) Sandra Smisek
CM	7	(Germany) Melanie Behringer
RW	18	(Germany) Kerstin Garefrekes	(substituted off) 70'
LW	15	(Germany) Svenja Huth
CF	19	(Germany) Fatmire Bajramaj	(substituted off) 40'
Substitutions:
FW	21	(Switzerland) Ana-Maria Crnogorčević	(substituted on) 40'
FW	6	(Germany) Silvana Chojnowski	(substituted on) 70'
Manager:
Sven Kahlert

MUNICH:
GK	1	(Germany) Kathrin Längert
RB	16	(Germany) Rebecca Huyleur	(substituted off) 89'
CB	19	(Austria) Carina Wenninger
CB	23	(Switzerland) Sandra de Pol
LB	6	(Germany) Katharina Baunach
CM	3	(United States) Niki Cross
CM	25	(Austria) Viktoria Schnaderbeck
RW	27	(Austria) Laura Feiersinger
LW	9	(Switzerland) Vanessa Bürki	(substituted off) 85'
CF	8	(United States) Sarah Hagen
CF	28	(Germany) Isabell Bachor	(substituted off) 61'
Substitutions:
MF	15	(Germany) Lena Lotzen	(substituted on) 61'
DF	4	(Germany) Clara Schöne	(substituted on) 85'
FW	7	(Germany) Ivana Rudelic	(substituted on) 89'
Manager:
Thomas Wörle

Assistant referees:
Mirka Derlin
Kathrin Heimann
Fourth official:
Christine Baitinger

== Top goalscorers ==
Scorer	Club	Goals
(Germany) Alexandra Popp	FCR 2001 Duisburg	10
(Germany) Marie Pollmann	BV Cloppenburg	8
(Germany) Kerstin Garefrekes	1. FFC Frankfurt	5
(Germany) Sylvia Arnold	FF USV Jena	5
(Germany) Annabel Jäger	FSV Gütersloh 2009	5
(United States) Sarah Hagen	FC Bayern Munich	4
(Germany) Anna Laue	Herforder SV	4
(Germany) Nicole Loipersberger	VfL Sindelfingen	4
(Germany) Anne van Bonn	1. FC Lok Leipzig	4
