= 2015–16 Frauen-Bundesliga =

Frauen-Bundesliga
- Season: 2015–16
- Champions: FC Bayern Munich
- Relegated: Werder Bremen; 1. FC Köln
- UEFA Women's Champions League: FC Bayern Munich; VfL Wolfsburg
- Matches: 132
- Goals: 421 (3.19 per match)
- Top goalscorer: Mandy Islacker (17 goals)
- Biggest home win: Potsdam 6–0 Leverkusen
- Biggest away win: Jena 0–8 Wolfsburg
- Highest scoring: Leverkusen 4–5 Essen; Jena 4–5 Frankfurt

The 2015–16 season of the Frauen-Bundesliga was the 26th season of Germany's premier women's football league. FC Bayern Munich successfully defended the title. This season started on 29 August 2015.

== Teams ==
1. FC Köln was promoted from the 2014–15 Women's 2. Bundesliga south and Werder Bremen from the north group.

Locations of teams in the 2015–16 Bundesliga

Team	Home city	Home ground	Capacity
Bayer 04 Leverkusen	Leverkusen	Ulrich-Haberland-Stadion (Amateur)	3,200
SC Sand	Willstätt	Kühnmatt Stadion	2,000
FC Bayern Munich	Munich	Grünwalder Stadion	12,500
Werder Bremen	Bremen	Weserstadion Platz 11	5,500
SGS Essen	Essen	Stadion Essen	20,000
1. FFC Frankfurt	Frankfurt	Stadion am Brentanobad	5,500
SC Freiburg	Freiburg	Möslestadion	5,400
TSG 1899 Hoffenheim	Hoffenheim	Dietmar-Hopp-Stadion	6,350
FF USV Jena	Jena	Ernst-Abbe-Sportfeld	10,800
1. FC Köln	Köln	Südstadion	14,874
1. FFC Turbine Potsdam	Potsdam	Karl-Liebknecht-Stadion	10,786
VfL Wolfsburg	Wolfsburg	AOK Stadium	5,200

== League table ==
Pos	Team	Pld	W	D	L	GF	GA	GD	Pts	Qualification or relegation
1	Bayern Munich (C)	22	18	3	1	47	8	+39	57	Qualification for Champions League
2	VfL Wolfsburg	22	15	2	5	56	22	+34	47	Qualification for Champions League
3	1. FFC Frankfurt	22	15	1	6	49	25	+24	46	
4	SC Freiburg	22	9	5	8	38	24	+14	32	
5	SGS Essen	22	10	2	10	39	37	+2	32	
6	FF USV Jena	22	9	4	9	30	45	−15	31	
7	Turbine Potsdam	22	9	3	10	42	28	+14	30	
8	TSG Hoffenheim	22	8	4	10	33	33	0	28	
9	SC Sand	22	8	4	10	29	30	−1	28	
10	Bayer Leverkusen	22	6	3	13	21	56	−35	21	
11	Werder Bremen (R)	22	3	4	15	17	53	−36	13	Relegation to 2. Bundesliga
12	1. FC Köln (R)	22	3	3	16	20	60	−40	12	Relegation to 2. Bundesliga

Source: kicker.de
Rules for classification: 1) Points; 2) Goal difference; 3) Goals scored
(C) Champions; (R) Relegated

== Results ==
Home \ Away	BRE	ESS	FRE	FRA	HOF	JEN	KÖL	LEV	MUN	POT	SAN	WOL
Werder Bremen		0–6	1–0	1–1	0–4	1–2	6–2	1–1	0–2	1–4	1–0	0–3
SGS Essen	3–0		0–3	3–2	1–2	4–0	3–2	0–1	0–1	1–1	1–0	1–3
SC Freiburg	2–2	1–2		4–0	0–0	1–2	6–1	6–1	0–3	2–0	4–1	0–2
FFC Frankfurt	3–0	2–0	0–2		4–1	5–1	4–0	4–0	0–1	1–0	2–0	0–2
1899 Hoffenheim	2–0	4–0	2–0	0–1		1–1	4–0	3–1	1–3	0–3	2–3	0–4
FF Jena	1–0	1–4	1–1	4–5	3–1		0–2	3–1	1–1	3–0	1–0	0–8
Köln	2–2	0–3	0–1	0–2	1–1	2–1		1–2	0–2	3–2	1–5	0–3
Bayer Leverkusen	4–1	4–5	1–3	0–4	2–1	0–0	2–0		0–5	1–0	0–0	0–2
Bayern Munich	2–0	2–1	1–0	0–1	1–1	5–1	1–0	5–0		3–1	2–0	1–0
Turbine Potsdam	4–0	0–0	2–0	3–4	2–1	0–1	4–0	6–0	0–2		0–2	4–0
SC Sand	3–0	4–1	0–0	0–3	0–2	2–1	1–1	4–0	0–3	1–1		2–4
Wolfsburg	2–0	4–0	2–2	3–1	3–0	1–2	5–2	2–0	1–1	2–5	0–1	

Updated to match(es) played on 15 May 2016. Source: kicker.de
Legend: Blue = home team win; Yellow = draw; Red = away team win.

== Top scorers ==
Rank	Player	Club	Goals
1	(Germany) Mandy Islacker	1. FFC Frankfurt	17
2	(Netherlands) Vivianne Miedema	Bayern Munich	14
3	(Germany) Svenja Huth	Turbine Potsdam	13
4	(Germany) Charline Hartmann	SGS Essen	11
4	(New Zealand) Amber Hearn	FF USV Jena	11
6	(Germany) Sara Däbritz	Bayern Munich	9
6	(Germany) Dzsenifer Marozsán	1. FFC Frankfurt	9
8	(Austria) Nina Burger	SC Sand	8
8	(Germany) Kerstin Garefrekes	1. FFC Frankfurt	8
8	(Germany) Lea Schüller	SGS Essen	8

=== Hat-tricks ===
Player	For	Against	Result	Date	Ref.
(Netherlands) Vivianne Miedema	Bayern Munich	Bayer Leverkusen	5–0	20 November 2015	
(Germany) Dzsenifer Marozsán	1. FFC Frankfurt	Jena	5–4	21 November 2015	
(Netherlands) Vivianne Miedema	Bayern Munich	Jena	5–1	19 March 2016	
(Germany) Svenja Huth	Turbine Potsdam	Bayer Leverkusen	6–0	20 March 2016	
(Netherlands) Vivianne Miedema	Bayern Munich	Bayer Leverkusen	5–0	1 May 2016	
