= 2016–17 2. Frauen-Bundesliga =

2. Frauen-Bundesliga
- Season: 2016–17
- Champions: Werder Bremen (North); 1899 Hoffenheim II (South)
- Promoted: Werder Bremen (North); 1. FC Köln (South)
- Relegated: 1. FC Union Berlin; Bramfelder SV; SC Sand II; SV 67 Weinberg; TSV Crailsheim
- Matches played: 264
- Goals scored: 992 (3.76 per match)
- Top goalscorer: Agnieszka Winczo (25 goals)

The 2016–17 2. Frauen-Bundesliga was the thirteenth season of Germany's second-tier women's football league.

== North ==
The season started on 28 August 2016 and ended on 21 May 2017. Bramfelder SV was promoted from the 2015–16 Regionalliga Nord, 1. FC Union Berlin was promoted from the 2015–16 Regionalliga Nordost and Arminia Bielefeld was promoted from the 2015–16 Regionalliga West.

Pos	Team	Pld	W	D	L	GF	GA	GD	Pts	Qualification or relegation
1	Werder Bremen (C, P)	22	19	2	1	96	19	+77	59	Promotion to 2017–18 Bundesliga
2	VfL Wolfsburg II	22	17	3	2	76	16	+60	54	
3	BV Cloppenburg	22	16	2	4	66	29	+37	50	
4	FSV Gütersloh 2009	22	13	1	8	53	44	+9	40	
5	Arminia Bielefeld	22	10	2	10	44	54	−10	32	
6	Turbine Potsdam II	22	9	4	9	41	36	+5	31	
7	SV Meppen	22	9	3	10	41	40	+1	30	
8	Blau-Weiß Hohen Neuendorf	22	6	5	11	26	48	−22	23	
9	SV Henstedt-Ulzburg	22	7	1	14	43	55	−12	22	
10	Herforder SV Borussia Friedenstal	22	7	1	14	34	67	−33	22	
11	1. FC Union Berlin (R)	22	6	0	16	27	60	−33	18	Relegation to 2017–18 Regionalliga
12	Bramfelder SV (R)	22	1	0	21	18	98	−80	3	Relegation to 2017–18 Regionalliga

Rules for classification: 1) Points; 2) Goal difference; 3) Goals scored
(C) Champions; (P) Promoted; (R) Relegated

=== Results ===
2016–17 North
Home \ Away	UNB	BIE	BRA	BRE	BVC	GÜT	HEN	HER	NEU	MEP	POT	WOL
1. FC Union Berlin		1–0	0–2	2–5	1–3	2–4	1–4	3–1	1–0	2–4	1–4	0–3
Arminia Bielefeld	3–2		2–0	2–4	0–4	1–3	3–2	3–4	3–2	3–2	4–4	0–7
Bramfelder SV	0–3	0–3		1–6	3–6	1–8	0–4	1–3	1–4	1–5	0–1	0–4
Werder Bremen	7–0	4–1	8–0		2–0	6–1	5–0	9–1	2–2	3–0	3–1	3–1
BV Cloppenburg	0–2	8–1	4–3	1–4		4–0	5–0	3–1	3–0	2–0	3–1	1–5
FSV Gütersloh 2009	2–1	2–3	4–1	1–5	0–3		3–0	3–0	3–1	3–2	3–0	0–0
SV Henstedt-Ulzburg	4–0	2–4	7–0	0–2	0–5	4–6		1–3	4–1	1–4	0–3	2–5
Herforder SV	4–1	3–0	4–1	0–7	2–4	0–2	1–0		1–2	2–3	1–9	1–4
BW Hohen Neuendorf	1–0	0–4	3–2	0–4	1–1	0–5	1–5	3–0		2–0	0–0	0–2
SV Meppen	5–2	1–1	3–1	2–2	0–1	4–0	0–0	1–0	2–2		1–3	1–2
Turbine Potsdam II	0–1	0–1	5–2	3–2	0–3	1–0	1–3	2–2	1–1	0–3		1–0
VfL Wolfsburg II	4–1	3–0	8–0	2–2	2–2	5–0	2–0	5–0	6–0	6–0	2–1	

Updated to match(es) played on 21 May 2017. Source:
Legend: Blue = home team win; Yellow = draw; Red = away team win.

=== Top scorers ===
As of 21 May 2017.

Rank	Player	Club	Goals
1	(Poland) Agnieszka Winczo	BV Cloppenburg	25
2	(Poland) Agata Tarczyńska	VfL Wolfsburg II	20
3	(Germany) Sarah Grünheid	Arminia Bielefeld	17
4	(Germany) Alina Witt	SV Henstedt-Ulzburg	16
5	(Germany) Giovanna Hoffmann	Werder Bremen	14
5	(Germany) Vera Homp	SV Henstedt-Ulzburg	14
5	(Germany) Cindy König	Werder Bremen	14
5	(Germany) Giustina Ronzetti	Herforder SV	10
5	(Germany) Stefanie Antonia Sanders	Werder Bremen	
10	(Germany) Jasmin Sehan	VfL Wolfsburg II	11
10	(Germany) Magdalena Richter	FSV Gütersloh 2009	11

== South ==
The season started on 28 August 2016 and ended on 21 May 2017. SC Sand II was promoted from the 2015–16 Regionalliga Süd.

Pos	Team	Pld	W	D	L	GF	GA	GD	Pts	Qualification or relegation
1	TSG 1899 Hoffenheim II (C)	22	18	2	2	67	15	+52	56	
2	1. FC Köln (P)	22	15	2	5	48	23	+25	47	Promotion to 2017–18 Bundesliga
3	FSV Hessen Wetzlar	22	14	4	4	38	26	+12	46	
4	VfL Sindelfingen	22	13	1	8	45	31	+14	40	
5	Bayern Munich II	22	11	4	7	34	25	+9	37	
6	1. FC Saarbrücken	22	9	2	11	36	35	+1	29	
7	FFC Frankfurt II	22	7	5	10	32	41	−9	26	
8	TSV Schott Mainz	22	7	2	13	38	49	−11	23	
9	1. FFC 08 Niederkirchen	22	7	2	13	23	42	−19	23	
10	SC Sand II (Note: SC Sand withdrew their second team to the Regionalliga at the end of the season; therefore, the relegation play-off was cancelled.) (R)	22	5	4	13	27	46	−19	19	Relegation to 2017–18 Regionalliga
11	SV 67 Weinberg (R)	22	5	2	15	18	46	−28	17	Relegation to 2017–18 Regionalliga
12	TSV Crailsheim (R)	22	4	4	14	21	44	−23	16	Relegation to 2017–18 Regionalliga

Rules for classification: 1) Points; 2) Goal difference; 3) Goals scored
(C) Champions; (P) Promoted; (R) Relegated

=== Results ===
2016–17 Süd
Home \ Away	CRA	FRA	HOF	KÖL	MAI	BAY	NIE	SAA	SAN	SIN	WEI	WET
TSV Crailsheim		1–1	0–5	0–2	2–1	0–4	1–2	4–0	1–4	0–1	0–0	1–2
FFC Frankfurt II	1–0		1–1	4–2	5–0	0–2 (Note: Originally 5–0 to Frankfurt; forfeited to Munich for using 3 ineligible players.)	0–1	4–1	5–1	1–2	2–0	2–1
TSG 1899 Hoffenheim II	4–1	4–0		1–2	4–2	4–2	1–0	3–0	2–1	2–0	1–0	4–0
1. FC Köln	2–1	4–1	2–1		1–0	1–2	3–0	1–0	2–1	0–1	1–0	1–1
TSV Schott Mainz	4–1	3–0	2–5	2–3		2–2	2–0	2–3	3–2	1–0	4–1	2–0
Bayern Munich II	2–0	0–0	1–2	0–4	2–1		0–2	3–1	0–1	3–1	4–0	1–1
1. FFC 08 Niederkirchen	0–1	4–0	2–7	1–1	2–2	1–0		0–1	3–0	1–2	0–4	0–2
1. FC Saarbrücken	1–1	4–0	1–3	0–3	2–0	0–1	4–0		5–0	1–2	2–0	1–3
SC Sand II	1–1	1–1	0–3	0–5	3–0	0–0	4–0	1–5		0–3	3–0	1–1
VfL Sindelfingen	2–0	5–1	3–4	4–2	4–2	1–3	5–0	1–1	2–1		0–2	1–3
SV 67 Weinberg	2–3	1–1	0–5	0–4	2–0	1–2	0–4	1–3	2–1	1–4		1–0
FSV Hessen Wetzlar	3–2	3–2	0–0	3–2	5–3	2–0	2–0	1–0	2–1	2–1	1–0	

Updated to match(es) played on 21 May 2017. Source:
Legend: Blue = home team win; Yellow = draw; Red = away team win.

=== Top scorers ===
As of 21 May 2017.

Rank	Player	Club	Goals
1	(Germany) Annika Eberhardt	TSG 1899 Hoffenheim II	18
2	(Germany) Jana Beuschlein	TSG 1899 Hoffenheim II	15
3	(Germany) Carolin Schraa	1. FC Köln	14
4	(Germany) Rebecca Konhäuser	FSV Hessen Wetzlar	13
4	(Germany) Marleen Schimmer	TSV Schott Mainz	13
6	(Kosovo) Valentina Limani	FFC Frankfurt II	12
7	(Germany) Karoline Kohr	1. FC Köln	11
8	(Austria) Elisabeth Mayr	Bayern Munich II	10
9	(Germany) Anja Selensky	VfL Sindelfingen	9
9	(Germany) Ricarda Schaber	TSG 1899 Hoffenheim II	9
