= Magdalena Richter =

German association football player (b. 1992)

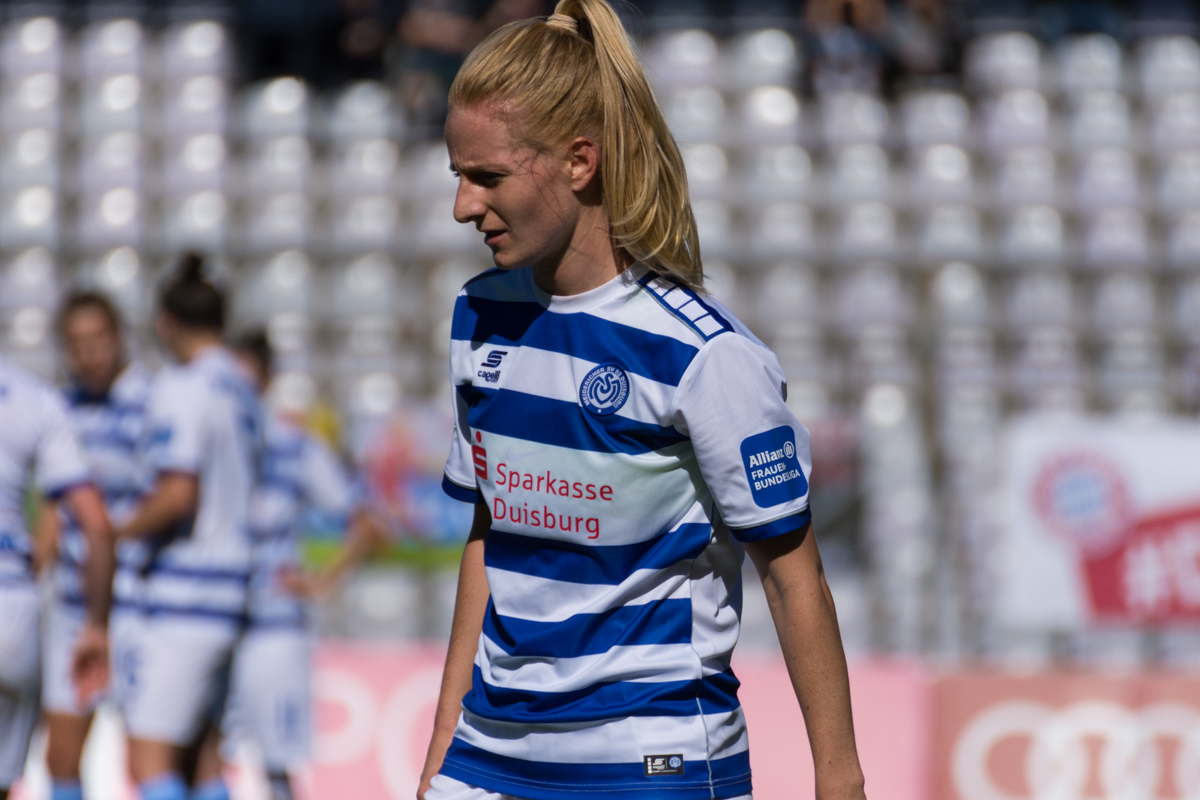
- Magdalena Richter in 2018

Personal information
- Full name: Magdalena Richter
- Date of birth: 7 July 1992 (age 34)
- Place of birth: Lüdinghausen, Germany
- Height: 1.65 m (5 ft 5 in)
- Position: Midfielder

Youth career
- SC Union Lüdinghausen
- Fortuna Seppenrade
- –2009: DJK Eintracht Coesfeld

Senior career*
Years	Team	Apps	(Gls)
2009–2013	DJK Eintracht Coesfeld		
2013–2014	DJK-VfL Billerbeck		
2014–2015	VfL Bochum	21	(5)
2015–2017	FSV Gütersloh 2009	40	(12)
2017–2019	MSV Duisburg	32	(0)
- * Club domestic league appearances and goals as of 1 August 2019

Magdalena Richter (born 7 July 1992) is a retired German footballer who played as a midfielder. Originally from Lüdinghausen, Richter has represented Germany at the student level on multiple occasions.

== Career ==
=== Statistics ===
As of 1 August 2019

Club	Season	League			Cup		Total	
Club	Season	Division	Apps	Goals	Apps	Goals	Apps	Goals
DJK Eintracht Coesfeld	2009–10	Regionalliga West						
DJK Eintracht Coesfeld	2010–11	Regionalliga West			—			
DJK Eintracht Coesfeld	2011–12	Regionalliga West			—			
DJK Eintracht Coesfeld	2012–13	Regionalliga West			—			
DJK Eintracht Coesfeld	Total							
DJK-VfL Billerbeck	2013–14	Verbandsliga Westfalen			—			
DJK-VfL Billerbeck	Total				0	0		
VfL Bochum	2014–15	2. Bundesliga	21	5	2	3	23	8
VfL Bochum	Total		21	5	2	3	23	8
FSV Gütersloh 2009	2015–16	2. Bundesliga	22	1	2	0	24	1
FSV Gütersloh 2009	2016–17	2. Bundesliga	18	11	2	2	20	13
FSV Gütersloh 2009	Total		40	12	4	2	44	14
MSV Duisburg	2017–18	Bundesliga	18	0	1	0	19	0
MSV Duisburg	2018–19	Bundesliga	14	0	1	0	15	0
MSV Duisburg	Total	Bundesliga	32	0	2	0	34	0
Career total								
