= Sarah Hagen =

American soccer player (born 1989)

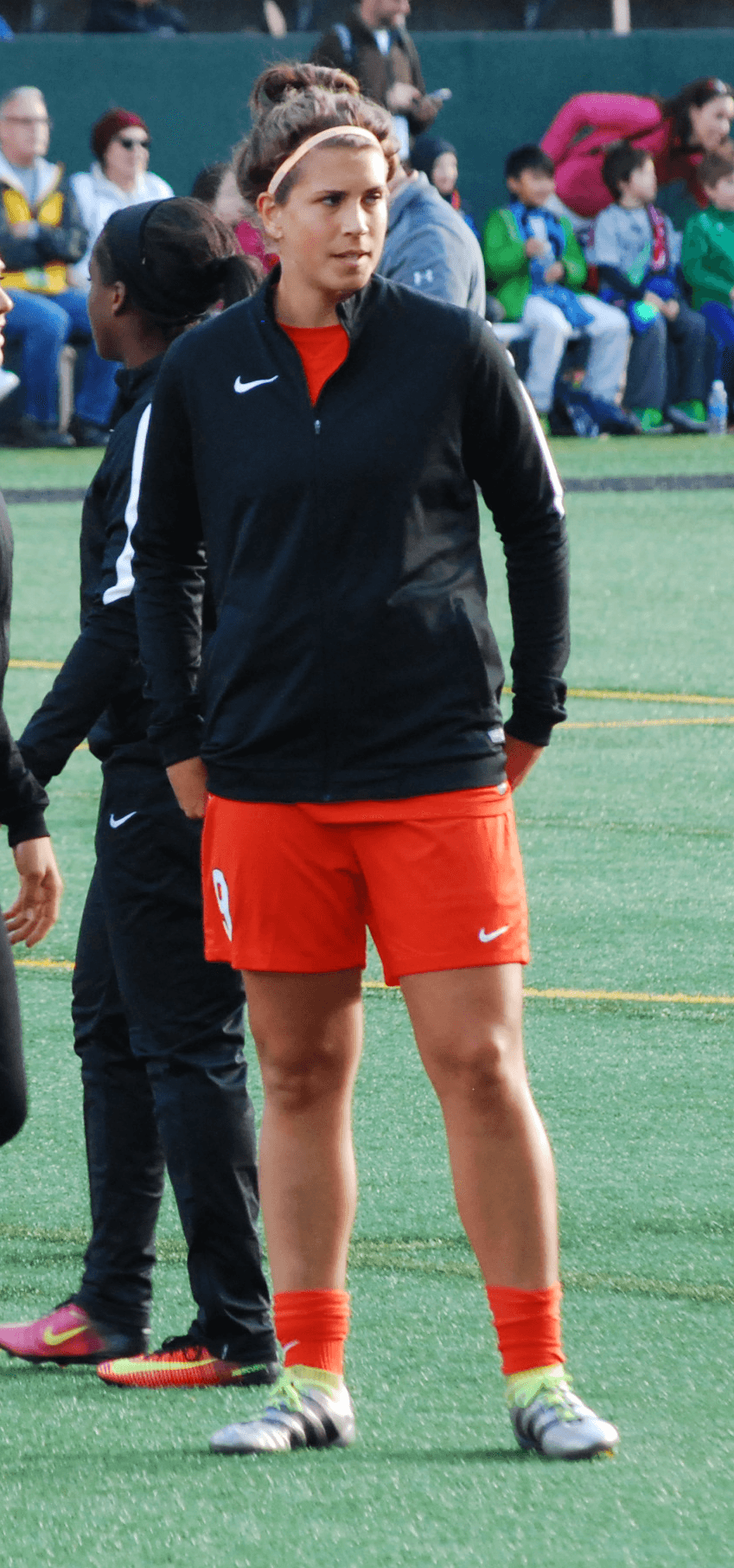
- Hagen, April 2017

Personal information
- Full name: Sarah Marie Hagen
- Date of birth: November 18, 1989 (age 36)
- Place of birth: Appleton, Wisconsin, U.S.
- Height: 5 ft 11 in (1.80 m)
- Position: Forward

Youth career
- Appleton Soccer Club
- Brookfield Soccer Club
- FC Milwaukee Nationals

College career
Years	Team	Apps	(Gls)
2008–2011	Milwaukee Panthers		

Senior career*
Years	Team	Apps	(Gls)
2010–2011	FC Milwaukee Nationals	8	(12)
2012–2013	FC Bayern Munich	51	(38)
2014–2015	FC Kansas City	26	(8)
2016	Orlando Pride	17	(2)
2017	Houston Dash	18	(2)

International career
2010–2011	United States U23	8	(7)
2014	United States	2	(0)

Managerial career
- 2018–2019: Orlando Pride Academy
- 2022–: Green Bay Glory (assistant)
- * Club domestic league appearances and goals

Sarah Marie Hagen (born November 18, 1989) is a retired professional soccer player who is currently an assistant coach for the Green Bay Glory in the USL W League. She previously played for Houston Dash, Orlando Pride, FC Kansas City and the German club FC Bayern Munich. In 2014, she earned two caps for the United States national team.

== Early life ==
Hagen is the daughter of Michele and Charlie Hagen. She was a soccer all-state selection for three years at Appleton North High School. At age 15, she was diagnosed with ovarian cancer and underwent a series of surgeries and chemotherapy. She had her last surgery on May 6, 2005.

=== Milwaukee Panthers, 2008–2011 ===
Hagen attended the University of Wisconsin–Milwaukee and played soccer for the Milwaukee Panthers. In her freshman year she set a league and school record for number of goals (24). She matched that total in her second year and scored 19 in her junior year and 26 in her senior year. She was named a first team All American in her junior and senior years. Hagen's 93 career goals are good for ninth in NCAA Division I history.

== Club career ==
Hagen played with the FC Milwaukee Nationals of the Women's Premier Soccer League while still a student in the university.

=== FC Bayern Munich, 2012–2013 ===
On January 12, 2012, Hagen joined German Bundesliga side FC Bayern Munich. On January 13, 2012, Hagen was taken in the first round of the 2012 WPS Draft by the Philadelphia Independence, giving the Independence her playing rights in the United States for one year. On May 9, 2012, Hagen signed a new two-year contract to remain in Munich. On May 12, 2012, FC Bayern Munich dethroned the German Cup title holders 1. FFC Frankfurt with a 2–0 win in the 2011–12 final in Cologne and celebrated the biggest success of the club's history since winning the championship in 1976. Hagen scored the first goal by a header.

During Hagen's career at Bayern Munich from January 2012 up until December 2013 she scored 38 goals in the 51 matches in which she played. That total includes 8 matches in which she scored 13 goals in the Frauen DFB Pokal, a championship tournament.

=== FC Kansas City, 2014–2015 ===
On March 20, 2014, FC Kansas City announced that Hagen would join their team in June 2014 after the end of her season with Bayern Munich. That year, she started seven games in nine appearances recording four goals and one assist.

=== Orlando Pride, 2016 ===
On October 26, 2015, the Orlando Pride announced they had acquired the rights to Hagen from FC Kansas City. On April 6, 2017, Orlando Pride announced that they had waived Hagen.

=== Houston Dash, 2017 ===
On April 10, 2017, the Houston Dash announced that they had claimed Hagen from the league waiver wire.

On February 2, 2018 Hagen announced her retirement from professional soccer.

Orlando City Youth Soccer announced that Hagen would join their coaching staff in Spring 2018.

== International career ==
Hagen scored a goal in all three United States U23 games in the 2011 Four Nations Tournament, including a game-winner vs. Sweden and the equalizer vs. Norway.

In December 2013, Hagen was invited to attend a two-week camp in California with the United States women's national soccer team.

In February 2014, Hagen was named to the roster for the senior national team to travel to the 2014 Algarve Cup in Portugal. She made her debut on March 7 for the United States women's national soccer team during the team's second match of the tournament and 1–0 loss to Sweden.

== Coaching career ==
Following her retirement from playing, Hagen coached with the Academy of the Orlando Pride in 2018 and 2019. She was also the assistant athletic director at Tohopekaliga High School during this time.

In 2022, Hagen returned to Wisconsin to join the coaching staff of the Green Bay Glory ahead of the inaugural USL W League season.

== Personal ==
Hagen's nickname is "Apple", referring to her hometown of Appleton, Wisconsin.

== Honors and awards ==
=== Club ===
with FC Bayern Munich:

- German Cup

Winners: 2011–12

with FC Kansas City:

- NWSL championship: 2014, 2015
