= 2015–16 Frauen-Regionalliga =

Regionalliga (women)
- Season: 2015–16
- Champions: Bramfelder SV (Nord); 1. FC Union Berlin (Nordost); Arminia Bielefeld (West); 1. FFC 08 Niederkirchen (Südwest); SC Sand II (Süd)
- Promoted: Bramfelder SV (Nord); 1. FC Union Berlin (Nordost); Arminia Bielefeld (West); 1. FFC 08 Niederkirchen (Südwest); SC Sand II (Süd)
- Relegated: Hallescher FC; Eintracht Frankfurt; TV Derendingen; SV Heidekraut Andervenne; FFV Fortuna Göcklingen; DJK Saarwellingen; Hamburger SV; SV Budberg; SV Eintracht Solingen; Sportfreunde Siegen; SC Opel Rüsselsheim
- Matches played: 688
- Goals scored: 2,708 (3.94 per match)
- Top goalscorer: Maxine Birker (33 goals)

The 2015–16 season of the Regionalliga (women) is the ninth season of Germany's third-tier women's football league using the current format.

== Nord ==
Pos	Team	Pld	W	D	L	GF	GA	GD	Pts	Qualification or relegation
1	Bramfelder SV (C, P)	22	20	1	1	77	23	+54	61	Promotion to 2016–17 2. Bundesliga
2	Werder Bremen II	22	17	2	3	92	33	+59	53	
3	TSV Limmer	22	13	4	5	47	35	+12	43	
4	FC Bergedorf 85	22	12	4	6	57	43	+14	40	
5	TV Jahn Delmenhorst	22	9	4	9	40	39	+1	31	
6	ATS Buntentor	22	9	2	11	49	51	−2	29	
7	Fortuna Celle	22	9	1	12	47	50	−3	28	
8	TSV Havelse	22	8	4	10	33	54	−21	28	
9	TSV Duwo 08	22	8	3	11	32	45	−13	27	
10	TSG Burg Gretesch	22	4	4	14	26	43	−17	16	
11	Hamburger SV (R)	22	3	4	15	22	66	−44	13	Relegation to Verbandsliga/Oberliga
12	SV Heidekraut Andervenne (R)	22	2	3	17	15	55	−40	9	Relegation to Verbandsliga/Oberliga

Rules for classification: 1) Points; 2) Goal difference; 3) Goals scored
(C) Champions; (P) Promoted; (R) Relegated

== Nordost ==
Pos	Team	Pld	W	D	L	GF	GA	GD	Pts	Qualification or relegation
1	1. FC Union Berlin (C, P)	20	16	3	1	81	20	+61	51	Promotion to 2016–17 2. Bundesliga
2	Magdeburger FFC	20	14	4	2	58	23	+35	46	
3	FF USV Jena II	20	12	4	4	49	16	+33	40	
4	FC Viktoria 1889 Berlin	20	11	4	5	32	25	+7	37	
5	BSC Marzahn	20	7	8	5	26	25	+1	29	
6	FC Erzgebirge Aue	20	6	4	10	35	43	−8	22	
7	FFV Leipzig II	20	7	1	12	46	60	−14	22	
8	1. FFC Fortuna Dresden	20	6	3	11	34	39	−5	21	
9	1. FFV Erfurt	20	6	3	11	34	51	−17	21	
10	Blau-Weiß Beelitz	20	5	2	13	26	47	−21	17	
11	1. FC Neubrandenburg 04	20	2	0	18	12	84	−72	6	
12	Hallescher FC (Note: Hallescher FC withdrew their participation due to financial problems.) (R)	0	0	0	0	0	0	0	0	Relegation to Landesliga

Rules for classification: 1) Points; 2) Goal difference; 3) Goals scored
(C) Champions; (P) Promoted; (R) Relegated

== West ==
Pos	Team	Pld	W	D	L	GF	GA	GD	Pts	Qualification or relegation
1	Arminia Bielefeld (C, P)	26	21	5	0	124	23	+101	68	Promotion to 2016–17 2. Bundesliga
2	1. FC Köln II	26	18	3	5	72	31	+41	57	
3	Borussia Bocholt	26	17	4	5	55	27	+28	55	
4	VfL Bochum	26	13	5	8	56	48	+8	44	
5	MSV Duisburg II	26	12	5	9	57	45	+12	41	
6	SGS Essen II	26	12	4	10	63	68	−5	40	
7	Warendorfer SU	26	11	2	13	48	60	−12	35	
8	SC Fortuna Köln	26	10	4	12	40	42	−2	34	
9	GSV Moers	26	9	5	12	45	55	−10	32	
10	Vorwärts Spoho Köln	26	9	3	14	58	57	+1	30	
11	Bayer 04 Leverkusen II	26	6	9	11	42	69	−27	27	
12	Sportfreunde Siegen (R)	26	7	2	17	34	72	−38	23	Relegation to Verbandsliga
13	SV Budberg (R)	26	5	3	18	33	85	−52	18	Relegation to Verbandsliga
14	SV Eintracht Solingen (R)	26	4	2	20	34	79	−45	14	Relegation to Verbandsliga

Rules for classification: 1) Points; 2) Goal difference; 3) Goals scored
(C) Champions; (P) Promoted; (R) Relegated

== Südwest ==
Pos	Team	Pld	W	D	L	GF	GA	GD	Pts	Qualification or relegation
1	1. FFC 08 Niederkirchen (C, P)	22	21	1	0	90	8	+82	64	Promotion to 2016–17 2. Bundesliga
2	SG Andernach	22	16	3	3	76	21	+55	51	
3	TuS Issel	22	13	2	7	78	44	+34	41	
4	SC Siegelbach	22	11	5	6	42	26	+16	38	
5	SC 13 Bad Neuenahr	22	11	4	7	46	31	+15	37	
6	1. FFC Montabaur	22	10	5	7	40	32	+8	35	
7	1. FC Saarbrücken II	22	8	4	10	40	35	+5	28	
8	TuS Wörrstadt	22	8	3	11	36	49	−13	27	
9	SV Dirmingen	22	5	4	13	32	60	−28	19	
10	1. FC Riegelsberg	22	5	4	13	22	58	−36	19	
11	FFV Fortuna Göcklingen (R)	22	2	5	15	16	61	−45	11	Relegation to Verbandsliga
12	DJK Saarwellingen (R)	22	1	2	19	16	109	−93	5	Relegation to Verbandsliga

Rules for classification: 1) Points; 2) Goal difference; 3) Goals scored
(C) Champions; (P) Promoted; (R) Relegated

== Süd ==
Pos	Team	Pld	W	D	L	GF	GA	GD	Pts	Qualification or relegation
1	SC Sand II (C, P)	22	18	2	2	67	19	+48	56	Promotion to 2016–17 2. Bundesliga
2	TSV Schwaben Augsburg	22	14	3	5	54	26	+28	45	
3	SV Frauenbiburg	22	14	3	5	42	21	+21	45	
4	FC Ingolstadt 04	22	11	4	7	34	22	+12	37	
5	1. FC Nürnberg	22	11	4	7	41	37	+4	37	
6	TSV Jahn Calden	22	10	5	7	49	37	+12	35	
7	Hegauer FV	22	10	3	9	33	31	+2	33	
8	FV Löchgau	22	8	5	9	21	28	−7	29	
9	FFC Wacker München	22	9	1	12	36	39	−3	28	
10	SC Opel Rüsselsheim (R)	22	7	0	15	27	55	−28	21	Relegation to Oberliga
11	TV Derendingen (R)	22	2	1	19	20	65	−45	7	Relegation to Oberliga
12	Eintracht Frankfurt (R)	22	1	3	18	19	63	−44	6	Relegation to Oberliga

Rules for classification: 1) Points; 2) Goal difference; 3) Goals scored
(C) Champions; (P) Promoted; (R) Relegated

== Top scorers ==
As of 9 September 2016

Rank	Player	Club	Goals
1	(Germany) Maxine Birker	Arminia Bielefeld	33
2	(Belgium) Suzanne Clysters	Vorwärts Spoho Köln	26
2	(Poland) Kamila Kmiecik	Arminia Bielefeld	26
4	(Germany) Kristin Götz	1. FFC 08 Niederkirchen	25
5	(Germany) Karoline Kohr	TuS Issel	24
6	(Germany) Maria Albrecht	Bramfelder SV	22
7	(Albania) Furtuna Velaj	SC Sand II	20
7	(Germany) Fabienne Stejskal	FC Bergedorf 85	20
9	(Germany) Lisa Budde	1. FC Union Berlin	19
9	(Germany) Nicole Päpke	SV Eintracht Solingen	19
