= Harald Kohr =

German footballer and coach (born 1962)

Personal information
- Date of birth: 14 March 1962 (age 64)
- Place of birth: Trier, West Germany
- Height: 1.86 m (6 ft 1 in)
- Position: Striker

Youth career
- TSC Pfalzel
- SV Ruwer
- SV Mehring

Senior career*
Years	Team	Apps	(Gls)
1981–1986	Eintracht Trier	220	(109)
1986–1989	1. FC Kaiserslautern	86	(45)
1989–1990	Grasshoppers		
1990–1991	→ SG Wattenscheid 09 (loan)	11	(1)

Managerial career
- 1992–1994: Eintracht Trier (youth)
- 1996–1997: SV Leiwen
- 1997–1998: CS Grevenmacher
- 1998: TuS Issel (youth)
- 2005: Jeunesse Esch
- * Club domestic league appearances and goals

Harald Kohr (born 14 March 1962) is a German football coach and a former player. He signed with VfB Stuttgart in the 1989 off-season after finishing in the top ten of Bundesliga scorers for three consecutive seasons, but suffered a serious knee injury with few days to go before the season opening and had to leave the team.

== Personal life ==
Kohr's daughter, Karoline, and son, Dominik are also professional footballers.
