= Allison Scurich =

American-born Croatian footballer (born 1986)

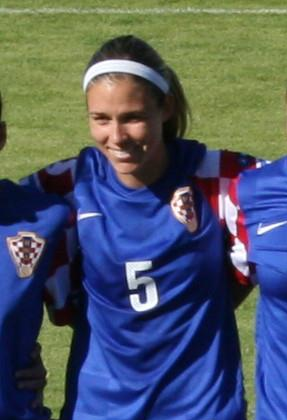
- Scurich playing for the Croatia national team in 2012

Personal information
- Full name: Allison Lee Scurich
- Date of birth: 7 June 1986 (age 40)
- Place of birth: Mission Viejo, California, U.S.
- Height: 1.78 m (5 ft 10 in)
- Positions: Defender; midfielder

College career
Years	Team	Apps	(Gls)
2004–2007	Washington State Cougars	73	(7)

Senior career*
Years	Team	Apps	(Gls)
2004	Las Vegas Tabagators	1	(0)
2008–2009	West Coast FC		
2009	Los Angeles Sol	0	(0)
2009–2012	TSV Crailsheim	63	(5)
2012–2015	SC Sand	64	(9)
2015–2016	Turbine Potsdam	0	(0)
2015–2016	Turbine Potsdam II	3	(0)

International career
2011–2014	Croatia	23	(0)

Managerial career
- 2008–2009: Washington State Cougars (assistant)
- 2008–2009: Cougar Soccer Academy (assistant)
- * Club domestic league appearances and goals

Allison Lee Scurich (born 7 June 1986) is a former soccer defender who played professionally in the United States and Germany. Born in the United States, she won 23 caps for the Croatia women's national football team between 2011 and 2014.

== Early life and college ==
Scurich attended Aliso Niguel High School in Aliso Viejo, California, where she was a multi-sport athlete competing at a high competitive level in both soccer and basketball. In her high school career, she was named the Sea View League Athlete of the Year, league MVP in both sports, and selected to the first-team All-CIF. Following high school, she briefly played for the Las Vegas Tabagators in the Women's Premier Soccer League (WPSL).

Scurich played college soccer for the Washington State Cougars from 2004 to 2007, pursuing a degree in sport management. Known as a vital piece of the team, she earned Pac-10 All-Conference second-team and All-Academic team selections during her tenure. Outside of football, she grew up a lifelong fan of the San Francisco Giants baseball team.

== Club career ==
Scurich played for West Coast FC in 2008 and when Women's Professional Soccer was being put together, she was attached to Los Angeles Sol. However she was released in pre-season. In July 2009, she moved to Germany after being noticed by scouts from TSV Crailsheim, playing three seasons in the 2. Frauen-Bundesliga and scoring five goals in 63 league matches.

In 2012, Scurich transferred to SC Sand. She became a regular starter in the defensive line and helped the club secure a historic promotion to the top-flight Frauen-Bundesliga for the 2014–15 season, totaling 64 appearances and nine goals during her stint with the club.

In March 2015, Scurich agreed a transfer to 1. FFC Turbine Potsdam alongside her SC Sand teammate Patricia Hanebeck for the 2015–16 season. Although she briefly initiated training with Turbine in July 2015, she unexpectedly dissolved her contract and announced her retirement from soccer. However, following a cruciate ligament injury to Turbine's defensive anchor Johanna Elsig, head coach Bernd Schröder convinced Scurich to reverse her retirement decision and return to the squad later that autumn.

== Coaching career ==
On 20 June 2008, Scurich was appointed as an assistant soccer coach for the Washington State Cougars and the Cougar Soccer Academy, a position she held until her move to Europe in 2009.

== International career ==
Scurich qualified to represent the Croatia national team through family heritage; her father John is of Croatian descent, with grandparents originating from Čilipi and Mljet. She was encouraged by her manager in Germany to join the national pool and contact with team captain Iva Landeka facilitated her introduction to the squad.

Scurich made her international debut for Croatia on 15 May 2011, playing the full 90 minutes in a 1–1 friendly draw at home against Hungary. She made her competitive debut on 22 October 2011, playing a full 90 minutes in a 0–3 defeat by the Netherlands during UEFA Women's Euro 2013 qualifying. Scurich played every single minute of Croatia's eight Euro qualifying matches. During the 2015 FIFA Women's World Cup qualification cycle, Scurich scored a fourth-minute injury-time own goal in a 1–1 draw against the Republic of Ireland. Between 2011 and 2014, she amassed a total of 23 caps for the national team, often playing alongside other Croatian Americans including Helenna Hercigonja-Moulton.

== Personal life ==
Scurich grew up in Laguna Niguel, California with her parents, John and Patty Scurich, and her brother, Nick. In September 2018, Scurich married her partner Sara Sample; the couple already had a daughter.

== Career statistics ==
=== International ===
Croatia
Year	Apps	Goals
2011	8	0
2012	6	0
2013	4	0
2014	5	0
Total	23	0
