= 2014–15 2. Frauen-Bundesliga =

2. Bundesliga (women)
- Season: 2014–15
- Champions: 1. FC Lübars (North); 1. FC Köln (South)
- Promoted: 1. FC Köln; Werder Bremen
- Relegated: 1. FC Union Berlin; Magdeburger FFC; 1. FFC Montabaur; 1. FFC 08 Niederkirchen; VfL Bochum
- Matches: 264
- Goals: 949 (3.59 per match)
- Top goalscorer: Lise Munk (27 goals)
- Biggest home win: Köln 13–0 ETSV Würzburg (16 November 2014)
- Biggest away win: Union Berlin 3–10 Gütersloh (25 May 2015)
- Highest scoring: Union Berlin 3–10 Gütersloh (25 May 2015); 1. FC Köln 13–0 ETSV Würzburg (16 November 2014)

The 2014–15 season of the 2. Bundesliga (women) was the eleventh season of Germany's second-tier women's football league. The season began on 31 August 2014.

== Changes ==
VfL Bochum played in the north group, not in the south group like in previous season. VfL Bochum was automatically relegated back to the Regionalliga after the end of the season due to financial problems, having failed to apply a license for next season. This meant that there was no relegation playoff this season.

== North ==
=== League table ===
Lübars won the league, but did not apply for a licence to the first Bundesliga because of financial reasons. Bremen therefore got promoted.

Pos	Team	Pld	W	D	L	GF	GA	GD	Pts	Qualification or relegation
1	1. FC Lübars (C)	22	16	3	3	53	12	+41	51	
2	Werder Bremen (P)	22	16	1	5	71	25	+46	49	Promotion to 2015–16 Bundesliga (Note: 1. FC Lübars and Turbine Potsdam II were not eligible for promotion to the Bundesliga)
3	Turbine Potsdam II	22	13	5	4	50	23	+27	44	
4	FSV Gütersloh 2009	22	13	4	5	56	28	+28	43	
5	SV Meppen	22	12	6	4	43	30	+13	42	
6	BV Cloppenburg	22	9	6	7	36	35	+1	33	
7	VfL Bochum^{2} (R)	22	8	7	7	40	44	−4	31	Relegation to 2015–16 Regionalliga (Note: VfL Bochum did not apply for next season's license, thus automatically relegating them back to the Regionalliga.)
8	VfL Wolfsburg II	22	7	6	9	46	48	−2	27	
9	FFV Leipzig	22	8	2	12	42	37	+5	26	
10	Holstein Kiel	22	4	1	17	23	70	−47	13	
11	1. FC Union Berlin (R)	22	2	3	17	24	80	−56	9	Relegation to 2015–16 Regionalliga
12	Magdeburger FFC (R)	22	1	2	19	21	73	−52	5	Relegation to 2015–16 Regionalliga

Updated to match(es) played on 26 May 2015. Source: Soccerway
Rules for classification: 1) points; 2) goal difference; 3) number of goals scored.
(C) Champions; (P) Promoted; (R) Relegated

=== Results ===
Home \ Away	BER	BOC	BRE	BVC	GÜT	KIE	LEI	LÜB	MAG	MEP	POT	WOL
1. FC Union Berlin		3–3	1–4	0–2	3–10	1–3	1–4	0–2	2–1	1–3	0–2	1–1
VfL Bochum	1–1		5–2	2–1	1–0	4–1	0–4	0–3	5–3	2–2	1–3	2–2
Werder Bremen	9–0	4–1		4–0	0–1	2–0	2–1	4–2	5–0	3–0	1–3	2–1
BV Cloppenburg	3–0	2–2	2–1		1–2	4–0	2–1	0–2	0–0	0–0	0–1	1–3
FSV Gütersloh 2009	3–1	3–1	2–4	4–1		4–0	1–0	0–0	1–0	1–1	1–4	5–1
Holstein Kiel	3–2	2–3	0–4	1–4	0–2		1–2	0–3	3–2	0–1	1–2	0–5
FFV Leipzig	5–1	0–1	1–4	1–1	0–4	5–0		1–3	6–0	1–3	3–0	2–2
1. FC Lübars	6–1	2–0	0–0	1–2	1–0	6–0	2–0		3–0	2–0	0–0	4–1
Magdeburger FFC	1–2	1–2	0–5	2–3	2–6	1–5	1–3	1–6		3–5	1–5	1–0
SV Meppen	4–2	2–0	1–5	1–1	3–0	6–2	1–0	0–2	1–0		0–0	2–2
Turbine Potsdam II	7–1	2–2	4–2	1–2	1–1	0–0	4–1	2–0	4–0	0–1		0–1
VfL Wolfsburg II	3–0	1–1	0–4	6–3	2–5	7–1	2–1	0–2	1–1	2–5	3–5	

Legend: Blue = home team win; Yellow = draw; Red = away team win.

Updated to games played on 26 May 2015

- Note 1: Home team is in left column and away team is in top row.

== South ==
=== League table ===
Pos	Team	Pld	W	D	L	GF	GA	GD	Pts	Qualification or relegation
1	1. FC Köln (C)	22	20	2	0	67	14	+53	62	Promotion to 2015–16 Bundesliga
2	Bayern Munich II	22	12	4	6	51	27	+24	40	
3	FFC Frankfurt II	22	12	4	6	48	37	+11	40	
4	1. FC Saarbrücken	22	11	6	5	65	22	+43	39	
5	TSV Crailsheim	22	11	6	5	41	29	+12	39	
6	SV 67 Weinberg	22	7	5	10	30	34	−4	26	
7	TSG 1899 Hoffenheim II	22	5	7	10	30	45	−15	22	
8	VfL Sindelfingen	22	6	4	12	24	40	−16	22	
9	Alemannia Aachen	22	5	5	12	24	50	−26	20	
10	ETSV Würzburg	22	5	5	12	17	54	−37	20	
11	1. FFC Montabaur (R)	22	5	4	13	18	43	−25	19	Relegation to 2015–16 Regionalliga
12	1. FFC 08 Niederkirchen (R)	22	4	6	12	29	49	−20	18	Relegation to 2015–16 Regionalliga

Updated to match(es) played on 26 May 2015. Source: Soccerway
Rules for classification: 1) points; 2) goal difference; 3) number of goals scored.
(C) Champions; (R) Relegated

=== Results ===
Home \ Away	AAC	CRA	FRA	HOF	KÖL	MON	BAY	NIE	SAA	SIN	WEI	WÜR
Alemannia Aachen		0–1	0–3	2–1	3–4	1–2	1–4	2–1	4–3	1–0	1–1	1–0
TSV Crailsheim	3–0		2–3	1–1	0–1	3–1	1–0	7–2	2–1	4–1	1–4	2–0
FFC Frankfurt II	3–3	0–0		3–1	1–3	2–0	1–1	3–0	0–4	2–0	2–1	5–0
TSG 1899 Hoffenheim II	2–1	1–1	4–7		0–3	2–2	1–2	3–0	0–4	0–1	0–5	0–0
1. FC Köln	3–0	3–0	4–1	1–1		1–0	3–2	1–0	2–0	3–1	1–0	13–0
1. FFC Montabaur	1–1	4–2	4–0	0–0	0–6		0–5	1–0	1–0	0–2	1–2	1–2
Bayern Munich II	1–1	2–2	2–2	1–2	0–1	1–0		6–1	1–0	3–1	3–1	4–0
1. FFC 08 Niederkirchen	2–0	2–2	0–2	0–2	0–4	2–0	2–3		2–2	1–1	5–1	2–2
1. FC Saarbrücken	7–0	2–2	5–1	8–0	3–3	8–0	3–0	1–0		2–2	1–1	3–0
VfL Sindelfingen	1–0	1–2	0–2	2–2	0–1	0–0	2–6	0–1	1–5		1–0	4–2
SV 67 Weinberg	3–1	0–2	3–2	0–5	1–2	2–0	1–0	2–2	0–0	2–3		0–1
ETSV Würzburg	1–1	0–1	0–2	1–0	1–4	1–0	1–4	4–4	0–3	1–0	0–0	

Legend: Blue = home team win; Yellow = draw; Red = away team win.

Updated to games played on 26 May 2015

- Note 1: Home team is in left column and away team is in top row.

== Top scorers ==
As of 26 May 2015.

Rank	Scorer	Club	Goals
1	(Denmark) Lise Munk	1. FC Köln	27
2	(Germany) Cindy König	Werder Bremen	18
3	(Germany) Claudia Nusselt	TSV Crailsheim	16
3	(Germany) Stephanie Goddard	Werder Bremen	16
3	(Germany) Lisa Mayer	1. FC Saarbrücken	16
6	(Germany) Jacqueline de Backer	1. FC Saarbrücken	15
6	(Germany) Nina Heisel	SV Weinberg	15
8	(Netherlands) Nangila van Eyck	SV Meppen	14
8	(Germany) Nadine Anstatt	1. FFC Frankfurt II	14
8	(Germany) Madeleine Wojtecki	1. FC Lübars	14
