= Julia Zirnstein =

German footballer

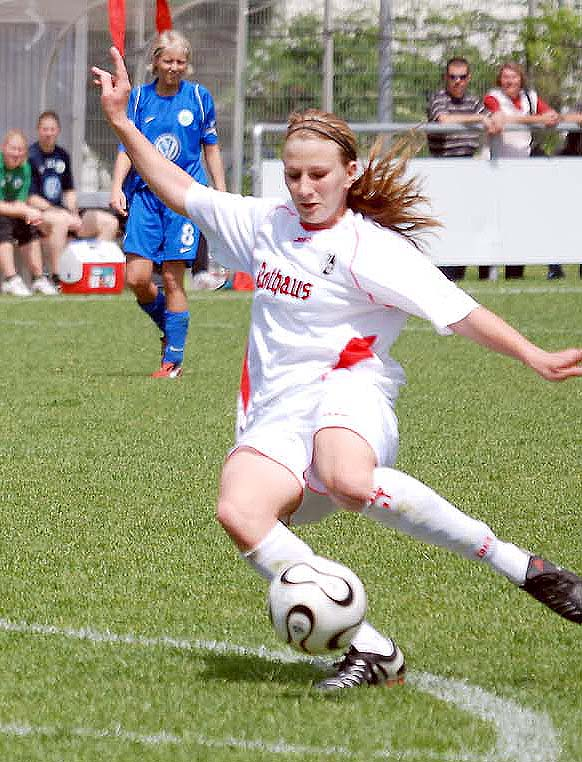

Personal information
- Full name: Julia Zirnstein
- Date of birth: 13 January 1990 (age 36)
- Place of birth: Schwetzingen, West Germany
- Position: Defender

Senior career*
Years	Team	Apps	(Gls)
2006–2012	Freiburg	96	(11)
2012–2018	Sand		
- * Club domestic league appearances and goals

Julia Zirnstein is a German football defender, currently playing for SC Sand in the 2nd Bundesliga. She previously played for SC Freiburg in the 1st Bundesliga.
