= Angela Migliazza =

German footballer (born 1984)

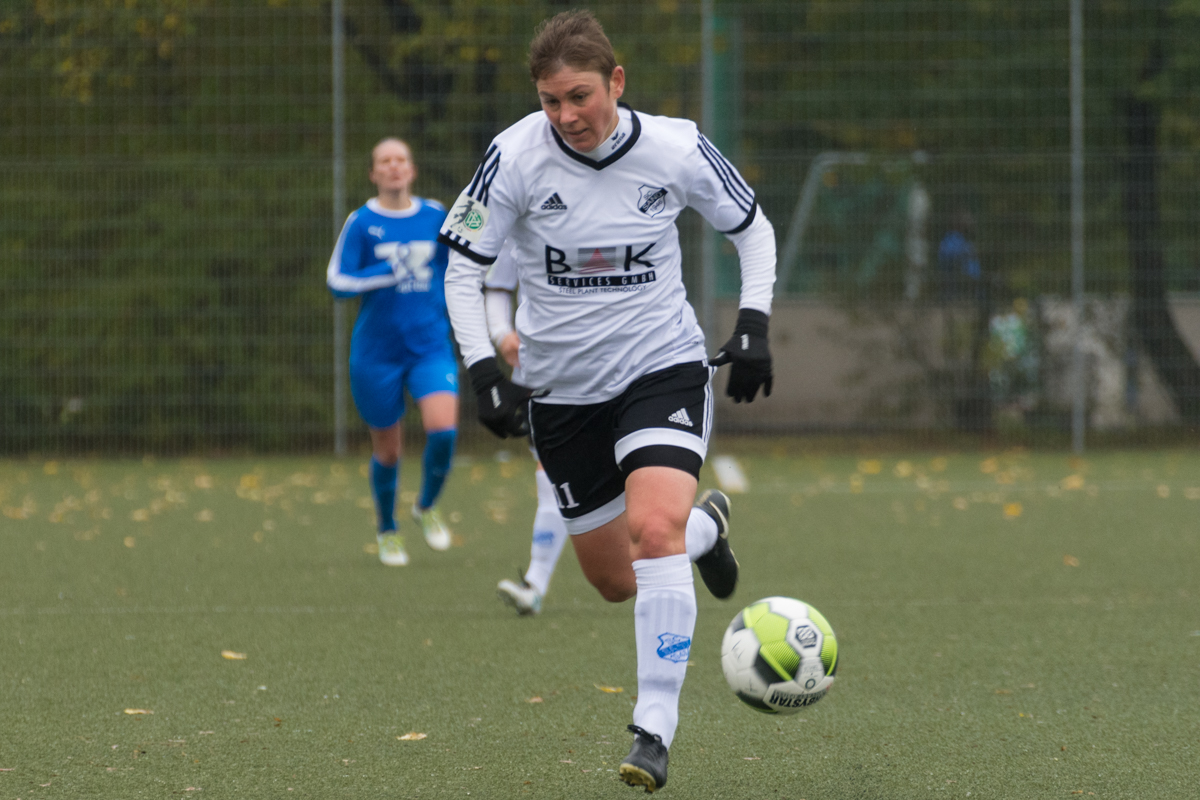

Personal information
- Date of birth: 28 July 1984 (age 42)
- Height: 1.69 m (5 ft 7 in)
- Position: Midfielder

Angela Migliazza (born 28 July 1984) is a German former footballer who played as a midfielder for SC Sand.
