= Venus El-Kassem =

German footballer (born 1995)

Personal information
- Date of birth: 4 January 1995 (age 31)
- Place of birth: Berlin, Germany
- Height: 1.60 m (5 ft 3 in)
- Position: Midfielder

Team information
- Current team: Türkiyemspor Berlin

Youth career
- –2010: Union Berlin
- 2010–2012: Turbine Potsdam

Senior career*
Years	Team	Apps	(Gls)
2011–2013	Turbine Potsdam II	11	(4)
2013–2015	Bayer Leverkusen	6	(0)
2015	Werder Bremen	2	(0)
2022–	Türkiyemspor Berlin		

International career
2011	Germany U16	5	(1)
2010–2012	Germany U17	10	(0)
2014	Germany U19	3	(1)
- * Club domestic league appearances and goals

Venus El-Kassem (born 4 January 1995) is a German footballer who plays as a midfielder for Türkiyemspor Berlin.
