= Gülhiye Cengiz =

German footballer (born 1992)

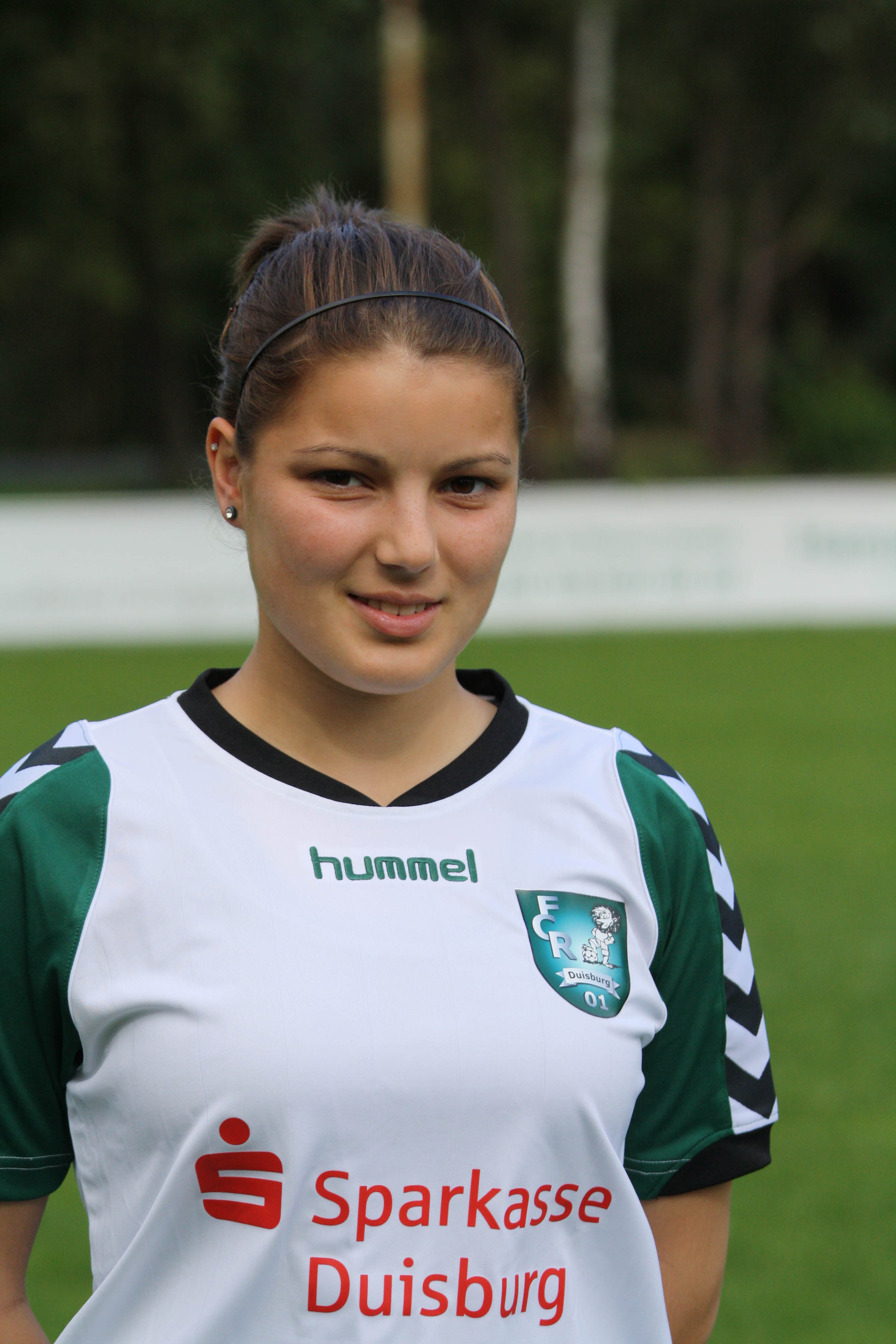
- Cengiz with FCR 2001 Duisburg in 2011

Personal information
- Date of birth: 14 April 1992 (age 34)
- Place of birth: Moers, Germany
- Position: Midfielder

Team information
- Current team: FCR 2001 Duisburg

Gülhiye Cengiz (born 14 April 1992) is a German footballer who played as a midfielder for the club FCR 2001 Duisburg.
