= Jennie Clark (soccer) =

American professional soccer defender

Personal information
- Full name: Jenista Elaine Clark
- Date of birth: October 31, 1988 (age 37)
- Place of birth: Norwalk, Iowa, United States
- Height: 1.71 m (5 ft 7 in)
- Position: Defender

College career
Years	Team	Apps	(Gls)
2007–2010	Minnesota Golden Gophers		

Senior career*
Years	Team	Apps	(Gls)
2011	Sky Blue FC	2	(0)
2011	New York Fury	4	(0)
2012	Lokomotive Leipzig	11	(1)
2012–2015	SC Freiburg	58	(1)
2015	1. FFC Frankfurt	5	(0)
- * Club domestic league appearances and goals

Jenista Elaine Clark (born October 31, 1988) is an American professional soccer defender who played for 1. FFC Frankfurt of the German Frauen Bundesliga and was named an assistant coach for Minnesota Aurora FC in 2021.

Clark signed for European champions Frankfurt in 2015, after three seasons with Bundesliga rivals SC Freiburg. She had arrived in Germany during the 2011–12 winter transfer window and played the remainder of that season with Lokomotive Leipzig. Delaying her graduation, she spent the 2011 campaign with Sky Blue FC of Women's Professional Soccer (WPS). Clark was named an assistant coach for the Minnesota Aurora, a USL W League team that began play in 2022.
