= Jennifer Martens =

German footballer (born 1990)

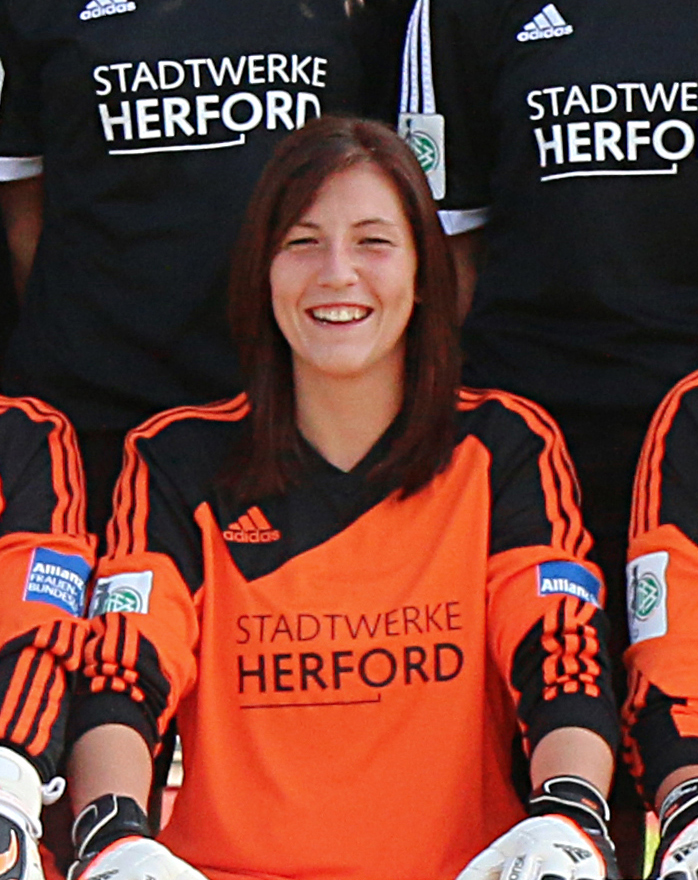
- Martens in 2014

Personal information
- Date of birth: 26 August 1990 (age 35)
- Place of birth: Bremen, Germany
- Height: 1.74 m (5 ft 9 in)
- Position: Goalkeeper

Senior career*
Years	Team	Apps	(Gls)
2007–2014	Werder Bremen		
2014–2015	Herforder SV		
2015–2016	Werder Bremen	19	(0)
2016–2017	VfL Wolfsburg		
2017–2018	Werder Bremen		
2022	Werder Bremen		
- * Club domestic league appearances and goals

Jennifer Martens (born 26 August 1990) is a German retired footballer who played as a goalkeeper, spending most of her career with Werder Bremen.

== Career ==
Martens joined Werder Bremen in 2007, when the club's women's team was established and started out in the fourth-tier Verbandsliga. Initially a backup goalkeeper, by 2012, with Werder Bremen playing in the 2. Frauen-Bundesliga, she had claimed number one spot.

Martens joined VfL Wolfsburg in January 2017.

== Honours ==
VfL Wolfsburg

- Frauen-Bundesliga: 2016–17
- DFB-Pokal: 2016–17
