= Clara Schöne =

German association football player

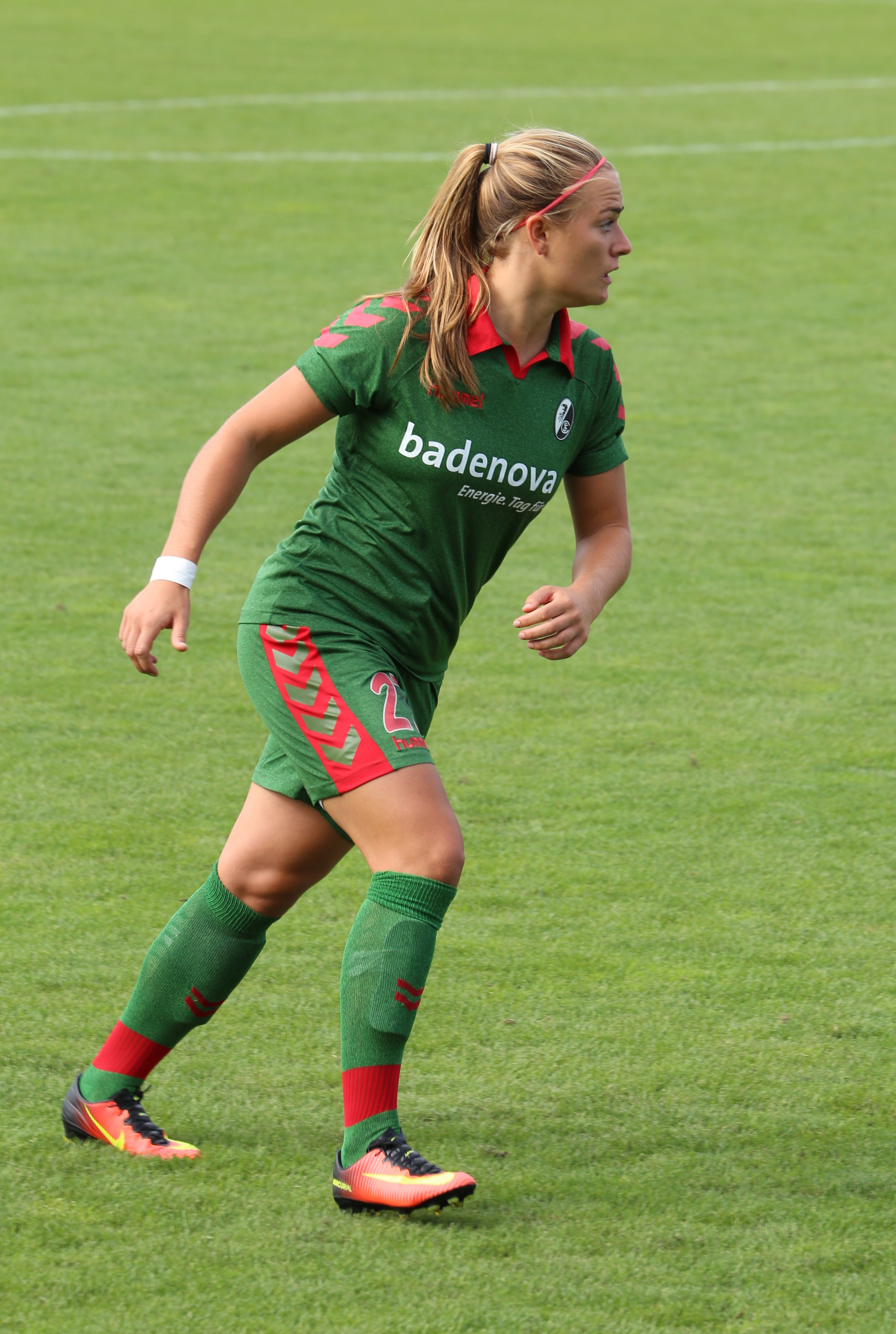

Personal information
- Date of birth: 6 July 1993 (age 33)
- Place of birth: Gräfelfing, Germany
- Height: 1.70 m (5 ft 7 in)
- Position: Defender

Team information
- Current team: Bayern Munich (assistant coach)

Senior career*
Years	Team	Apps	(Gls)
2010–2013	Bayern Munich II	4	(0)
2010–2014	Bayern Munich	57	(4)
2014–2019	SC Freiburg	69	(8)

International career
2010	Germany U-17	1	(0)
2011–2012	Germany U-19	3	(0)
2011–2012	Germany U-20	2	(0)

Managerial career
- 2020–2022: Bayern Munich II (assistant)
- 2022–2024: Bayern Munich II
- 2024–: Bayern Munich (assistant)
- * Club domestic league appearances and goals

Clara Schöne (born 6 July 1993) is a retired German footballer who played for Bayern Munich and SC Freiburg. Schöne retired from football at the age of 26 due to a knee injury.

== Post career ==
Schöne has been the assistant coach of the Bayern Munich women's team since the summer of 2024.

== Honours ==
Bayern Munich

- DFB-Pokal: 2011–12
- Bundesliga Cup: 2011
