= Nina Windmüller =

German footballer (born 1987)

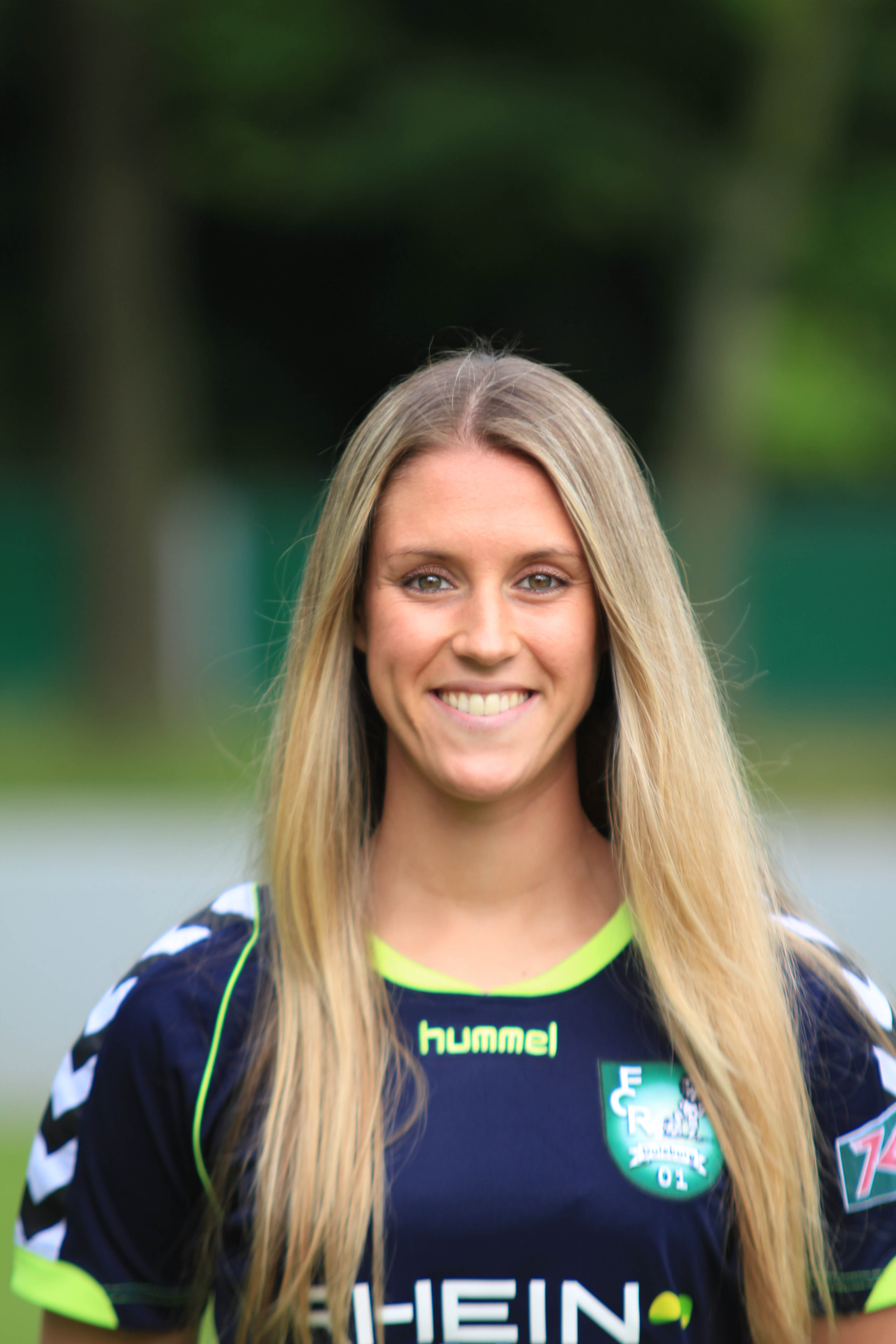

Personal information
- Date of birth: 8 November 1987 (age 38)
- Place of birth: Bergisch Gladbach, Germany
- Height: 1.75 m (5 ft 9 in)
- Position: Midfielder

Nina Windmüller (born 8 November 1987) is a German footballer who plays as a midfielder for Koln and football freestyler.
