= Maren Wallenhorst =

German footballer (born 1990)

Personal information
- Date of birth: 7 November 1990 (age 35)
- Place of birth: Osnabrück, Germany
- Height: 1.70 m (5 ft 7 in)
- Position: Midfielder

Senior career*
Years	Team	Apps	(Gls)
2006–2009	FC Gütersloh 2000		
2009–2012	Werder Bremen		
2012–2013	FSV Gütersloh 2009	18	(5)
2013–2017	Werder Bremen	54	(19)
- * Club domestic league appearances and goals

Maren Wallenhorst (born 7 November 1990) is a German former footballer who played as a midfielder for Werder Bremen.
