= Anne van Bonn =

German footballer

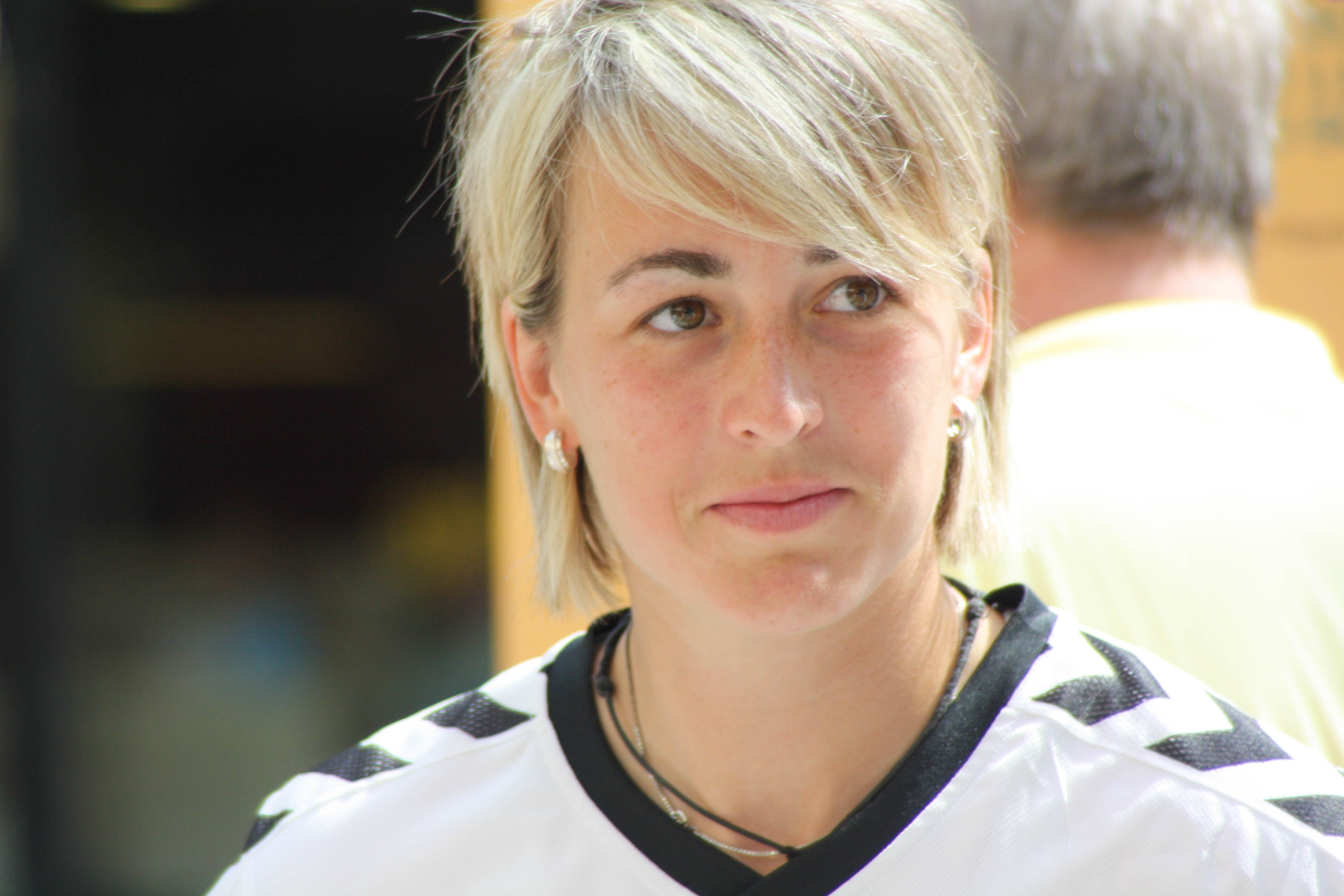
- van Bonn in 2010

Personal information
- Full name: Anne van Bonn
- Date of birth: 12 October 1985 (age 41)
- Place of birth: Geldern, West Germany
- Height: 1.68 m (5 ft 6 in)
- Position: Centre back

Team information
- Current team: SC Sand
- Number: 7

Youth career
- –2001: GSV Geldern 09/34

Senior career*
Years	Team	Apps	(Gls)
2001–2011	FCR 2001 Duisburg	159	(6)
2011–2012	Lokomotive Leipzig	10	(1)
2012–2013	FSV Gütersloh 2009	21	(3)
2013–2020	SC Sand	149	(27)

International career^{‡}
2002–2004	Germany U19	27	(1)
2005–2006	Germany U21	10	(0)
2007	Germany U23	4	(0)
- * Club domestic league appearances and goals as of 25 June 2020 (UTC) ‡ National team caps and goals as of 23 February 2010

Anne Van Bonn (born 12 October 1985) is a German footballer who has primarily played as a midfielder. Over her career, she has represented several clubs in Germany, including MSV Duisburg, SC Sand, and Hamburger SV. Standing at 168 cm, van Bonn has been known for her steady presence on the field.

== Biography ==
Van Bonn was born on 12 October 1985, in Geldern, North Rhine-Westphalia.

Van Bonn's career includes winning the UEFA Women's Champions League in 2008/2009 with MSV Duisburg and the DFB Pokal Women twice, in 2008/2009 and 2009/2010. During her time at SC Sand, she consistently made over 20 appearances each season, contributing to the team's defensive and midfield efforts.

In July 2021, van Bonn transferred to Hamburger SV. She continued to play key matches, including games against SGS Essen in October 2021 and other important fixtures during the 2019/2020 season with SC Sand, such as matches against Köln, USV Jena, and Hoffenheim.

She currently plays for FCR 2001 Duisburg.

In 2011, she transferred to Lokomotive Leipzig.

== Honours ==
=== FCR 2001 Duisburg ===
- Bundesliga: Runner-up (5) 2004–05, 2005–06, 2006–07, 2007–08, 2009–10
- German Cup: Winner (2) 2008–09, 2009–10, Runner-up (1) 2006–07
- UEFA Women's Cup: Winner (1) 2008–09

=== Germany ===
- FIFA U-19 Women's World Championship: Winner (1) 2004
- UEFA Women's U-19 Championship: Runner-up (1) 2004
