= Charline Hartmann =

German association footballer

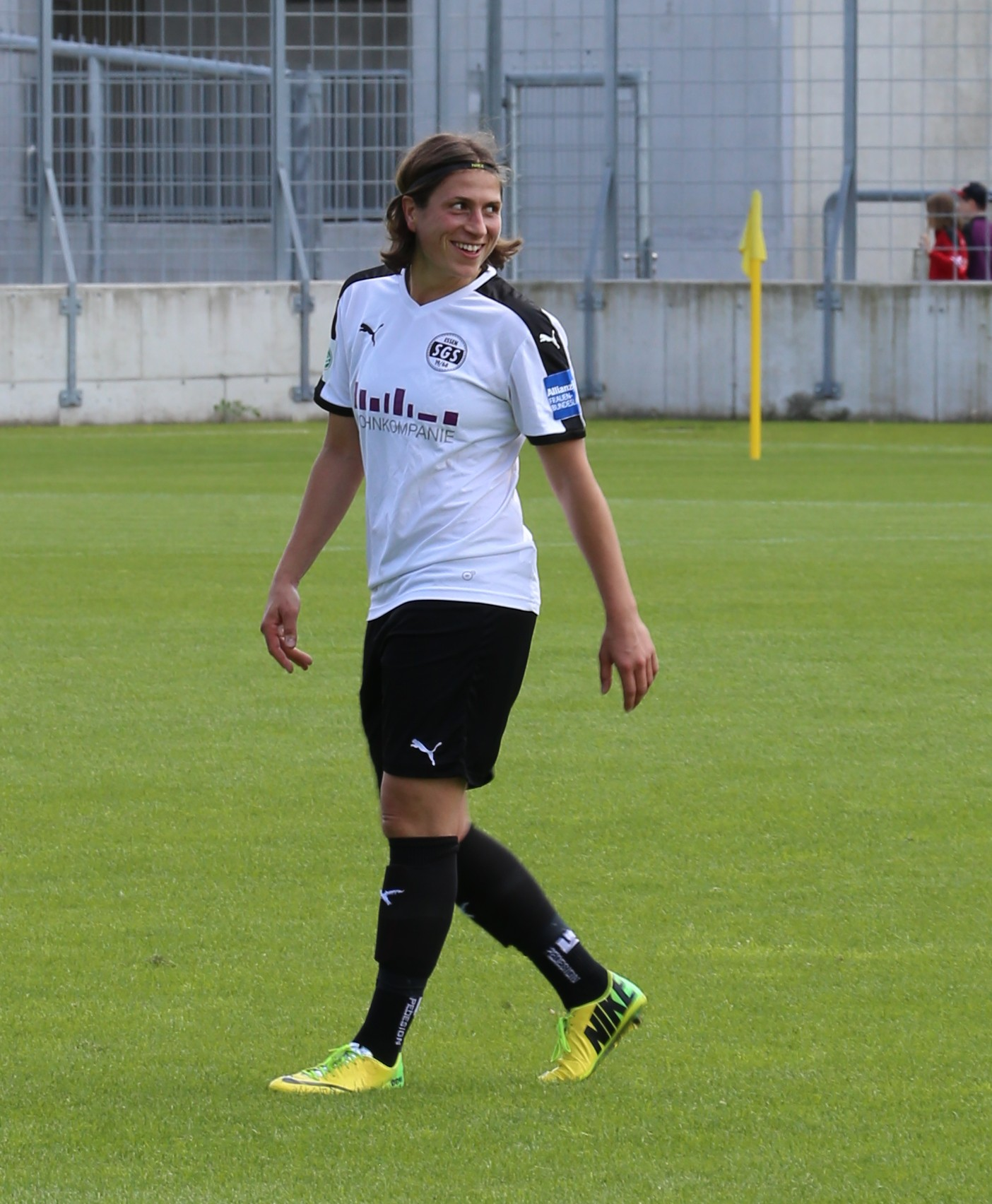

Personal information
- Date of birth: 26 December 1985 (age 40)
- Place of birth: Tönisvorst, Germany
- Height: 1.71 m (5 ft 7 in)
- Position: Forward

Team information
- Current team: SGS Essen

Charline Hartmann (born 26 December 1985) is a German footballer who plays as a striker.
