= Bramfelder SV =

German sports club

- Full name: Bramfelder Sportverein 1945 e.V.
- Founded: 1945; 81 years ago
- Ground: Am Sportplatz Gropiusring
- Capacity: 5,000
- League: Regionalliga
- 2017–18: Regionalliga Nord, 1st

Bramfelder SV is a German sport club from Hamburg. The club was founded in 1945 and competes in football. The club is most known for its women's football section which currently plays in the Regionalliga.

== Women's football ==
They play their home games at the Am Sportplatz Gropiusring which have a capacity of 5,000. On 10 June 2012, they were promoted to the Regionalliga Nord after beating ATS Buntentor. On 25 April 2016, they became the 2015–16 Regionalliga Nord champion after beating TSV Limmer, and achieved promotion to the 2. Bundesliga, only to be relegated after one season, finishing bottom. Bramfeld won their second Regionalliga Nord title in 2018 but declined to participate in the promotion round to the single-division 2. Bundesliga.

== Honours ==
- Regionalliga Nord
  - Winner: 2015–16, 2017–18
