= Jennifer Martin (soccer) =

American soccer player (born 1992)

Personal information
- Date of birth: November 16, 1992 (age 33)
- Place of birth: Naples, Florida, United States
- Height: 1.73 m (5 ft 8 in)
- Position: Midfielder

College career
Years	Team	Apps	(Gls)
2011–2014	UCF Knights		

Senior career*
Years	Team	Apps	(Gls)
2015–2016	FF USV Jena	15	(1)
- * Club domestic league appearances and goals

Jennifer Martin (born November 16, 1992) is an American former professional soccer player who played for FF USV Jena. After one season Martin left USV Jena.
