= Cindy König =

German footballer

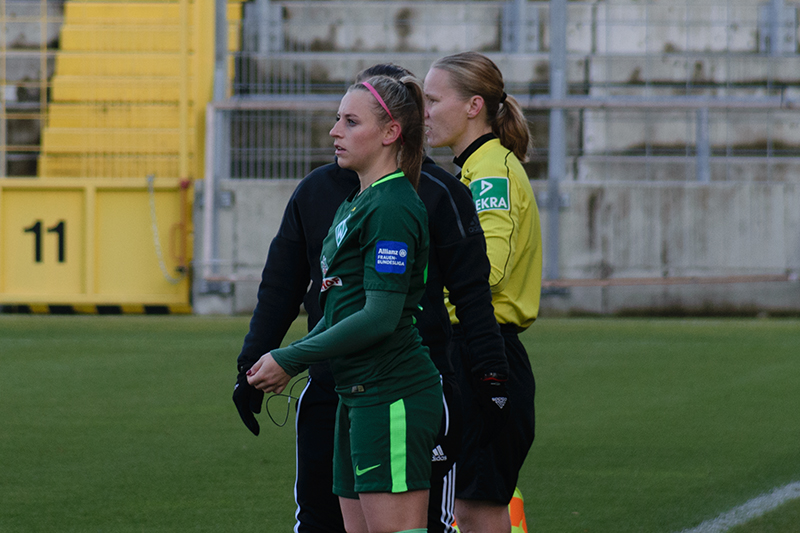
- König with Werder Bremen

Personal information
- Full name: Cindy Mayleen König
- Date of birth: 15 August 1993 (age 33)
- Place of birth: Bremerhaven, Germany
- Height: 1.60 m (5 ft 3 in)
- Position: Forward

Youth career
- 1999–2006: Sparta Bremerhaven
- 2006–2007: Geestemünder SC
- 2007–?: Werder Bremen

Senior career*
Years	Team	Apps	(Gls)
2009–2020	Werder Bremen	139	(75)
2020–2021	Braga	24	(8)
2021–2022	Nojima Stella		
2022–2024	SC Sand	37	(6)
- * Club domestic league appearances and goals

Cindy Mayleen König (born 15 August 1993) is a German former footballer who played as a forward. She spent most of her career with Werder Bremen.

== Career ==
König was born in Bremerhaven, Germany, and grew up in the city. At the age of 6, she joined Sparta Bremerhaven, where played in the boys' teams for seven years together with another girl. In 2006 she moved to Geestemünder SC and to Werder Bremen in 2007.

König was second top scorer of the 2012–13 2. Frauen-Bundesliga with 15 goals. In the following season she was top scorer with 17 goals and was voted player of the season by her club's fans while Werder Bremen finished in third place, their best placement in the league. She became top scorer for a second time in the 2014–15 season, with 19 goals. When König left Werder Bremen in summer 2020, she was the club's record goalscorer, with 99 goals in 208 competitive appearances, and the last active member of the founding year of the women's and girls' football team.

König made her WE League for Nojima Stella debut on 12 September 2021.

She retired from playing in August 2024.

== Honours ==
Individual

- 2. Bundesliga top scorer: 2013–14, 2014–15
