= Karoline Kohr =

German footballer

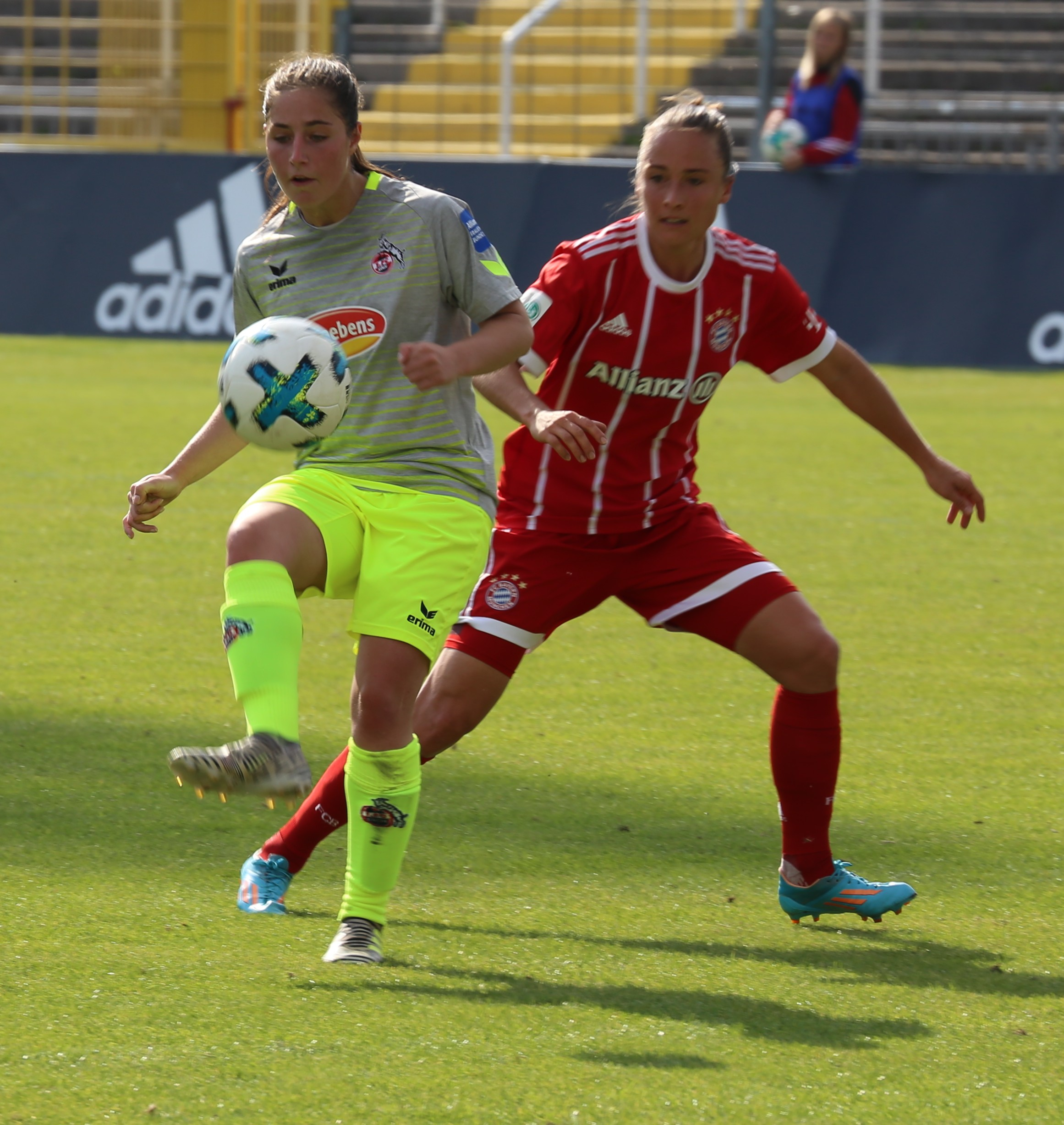
- Karoline Kohr, 1. FC Cologne, and Gina Lewandowski, FC Bayern Munich, at the women's Bundesliga game FC Bayern Munich against 1. FC Cologne on September 24, 2017 in the stadium on Grünwalder Straße

Personal information
- Full name: Karolina Katharina Kohr
- Date of birth: 1 April 1996 (age 30)
- Position: Forward

Karoline Kohr (born 1 April 1996) is a German footballer who plays as a forward and has played for 1. FC Köln. As of 2024, Kohr plays for Swift Hesperange.

== Personal life ==
Karoline Kohr's father was once a professional footballer. Kohr also has a brother Dominik Kohr who is also a footballer.

== Honours ==
- 2020–21 2. Frauen-Bundesliga
- Dames Ligue 1: 2022, 2023, 2024
- Luxembourg Women's Cup: 2022, 2023, 2024
