= Sabine Stoller =

German footballer (born 1991)

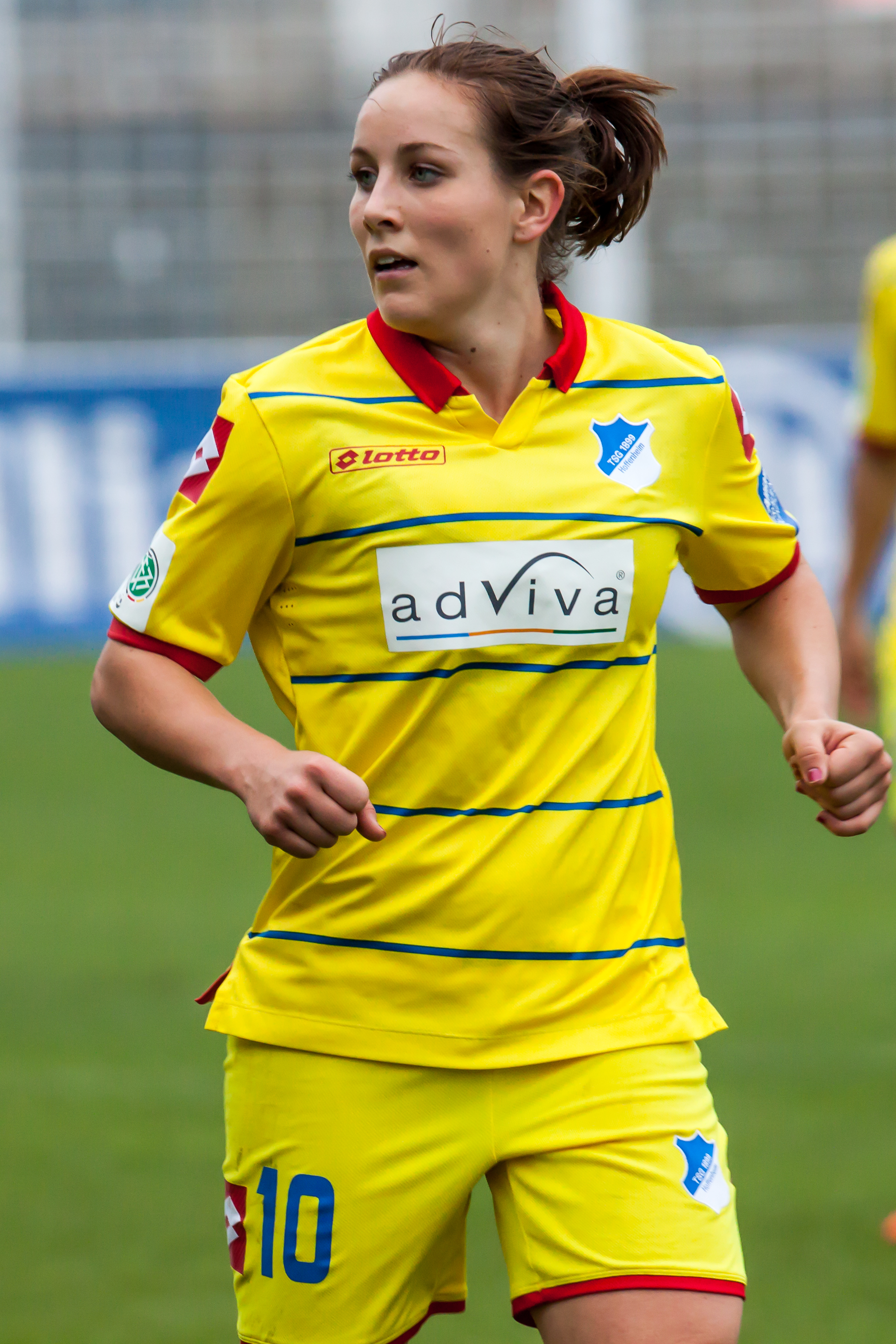

Personal information
- Date of birth: 2 September 1991 (age 35)
- Place of birth: Mannheim, Germany
- Height: 1.63 m (5 ft 4 in)
- Position: Midfielder

Sabine Stoller (born 2 September 1991) is a German footballer who plays as a midfielder for MSV Duisburg.
