= Svenja Huth =

German footballer (born 1991)

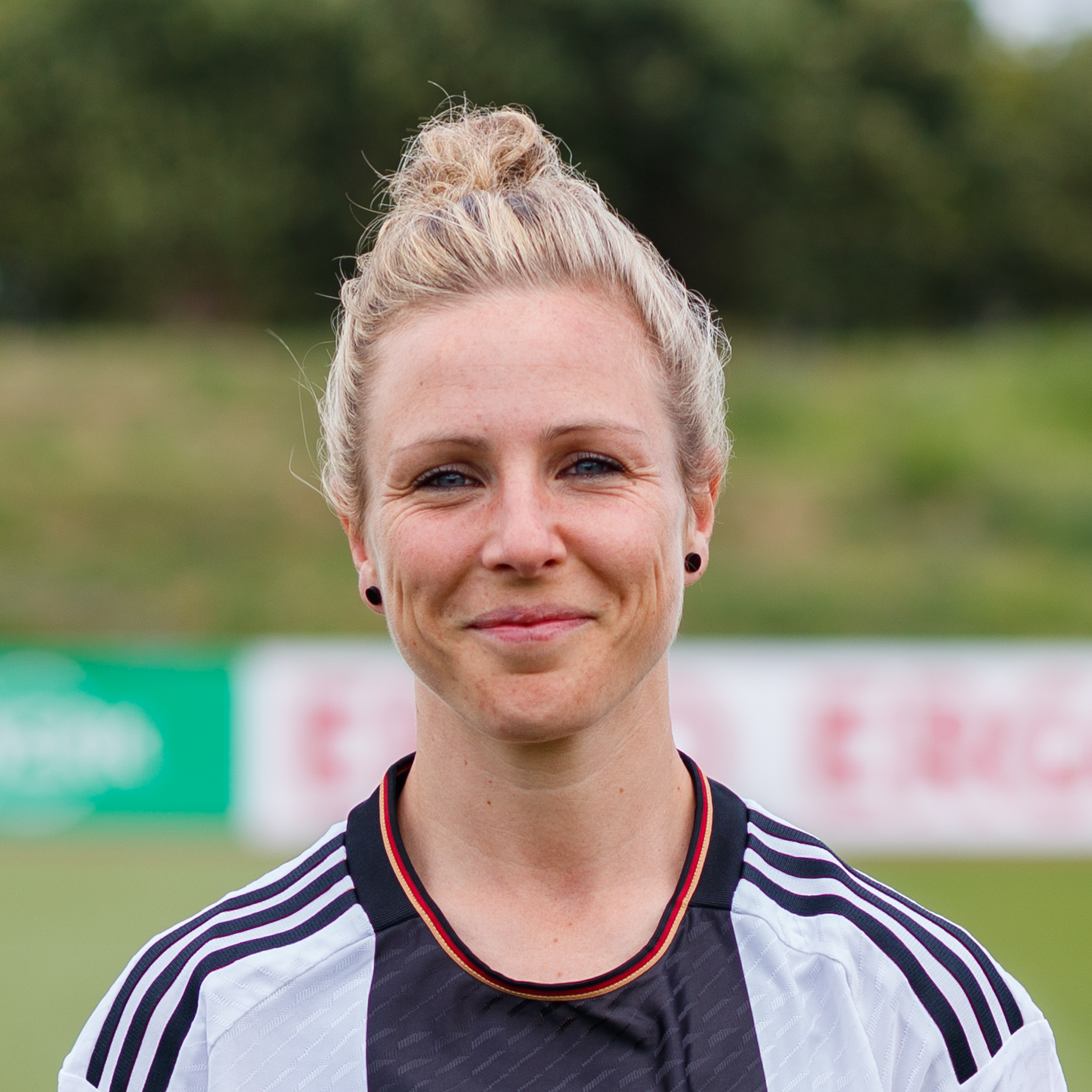
- Huth with Germany in 2023

Personal information
- Full name: Svenja Anette Huth
- Date of birth: 25 January 1991 (age 35)
- Place of birth: Alzenau, Germany
- Height: 1.63 m (5 ft 4 in)
- Position: Forward

Team information
- Current team: VfL Wolfsburg
- Number: 10

Youth career
- 1998–: SG Kälberau 1914
- –2005: FC Bayern Alzenau
- 2005–2007: FFC Frankfurt

Senior career*
Years	Team	Apps	(Gls)
2007–2015	FFC Frankfurt	122	(13)
2015–2019	Turbine Potsdam	82	(34)
2019–	VfL Wolfsburg	113	(15)

International career
2006	Germany U15	5	(4)
2006–2008	Germany U17	23	(7)
2009	Germany U19	8	(1)
2009–2010	Germany U20	13	(2)
2010–2012	Germany U23	2	(0)
2011–2024	Germany	88	(14)
Medal record
Women's football
Representing Germany
Olympic Games
Gold medal – first place	2016 Rio de Janeiro	Team
UEFA Women's Championship
Gold medal – first place	2013 Sweden
Silver medal – second place	2022 England
UEFA Women's Nations League
Bronze medal – third place	2024 France–Netherlands–Spain
- * Club domestic league appearances and goals as of 26 July 2025

Svenja Anette Huth (German pronunciation: [huːt]; born 25 January 1991) is a German professional footballer who plays as a forward for Frauen-Bundesliga club VfL Wolfsburg.

== Club career ==
=== 1. FFC Frankfurt ===
Huth started playing football at TSG Kälberau at the age of seven, and at the age of 14 came to the youth department of 1. FFC Frankfurt via the intermediate station FC Bayern Alzenau. For the 2007/08 season, she was promoted to the Bundesliga squad. She made her first appearance in the Bundesliga on 2 December 2007, when she came on in the 46th minute for the injured Kerstin Garefrekes. She earned her first Bundesliga title at the end of her debut season. She scored her first two Bundesliga goals on 10 May 2009 (20th matchday) in a 5–1 away win against TSV Crailsheim.

In her first DFB Cup appearance on 25 November 2007, she shot 1. FFC Frankfurt against Tennis Borussia Berlin into the quarter-finals when she scored the goal in the 43rd minute to make it 1–0. In 2015, she won the UEFA Women's Champions League with Frankfurt after beating Paris Saint-Germain 2–1.

=== Turbine Potsdam ===
Huth played for the German side Turbine Potsdam from 2015 to 2019.

=== VfL Wolfsburg ===
In 2019, Huth moved to VfL Wolfsburg. In 2020 she won the German Championship and the DFB Cup with Wolfsburg. In 2021, the cup was defended with a 1–0 win after extra time against Eintracht Frankfurt. In January 2025 Huth extended her contract in Wolfsburg until 2026.

== International career ==
Huth made it into the squad of the U15 national team via Bayern selection, for which she came on 3 April 2006 in Enschede in the 0–1 defeat against the U16 selection of the Dutch, substituting in the 41st minute for Sabine Stoller. She scored her first international goal on 14 August 2006 in Uslar in a 7–1 win over Wales, scoring 2–1 in the 37th minute. In the U17 national team, she became a regular player. She took part in the 2010 World Cup with the U20 national team took part on home soil, completed all six tournament matches (scoring 2 goals), reached the final, and became world champion with a 2–0 win over Nigeria.

Huth made her debut for the senior national team on 26 October 2011 as a substitute in a friendly 1–0 win against Sweden. On 7 March 2012, she won the Algarve Cup with the national team in Faro by beating the reigning world champions Japan 4–3 in the final. She was used in all four tournament games. At the 2013 European Championship in Sweden, she was part of the DFB squad, but was not used. She was part of the squad for the 2016 Summer Olympics, where Germany won the gold medal. All players received the Silver Laurel Leaf from Federal President Gauck on 1 November 2016.

At the 2017 European Championship in the Netherlands, Huth played all four games until the German team was eliminated in the quarter-finals against Denmark.

She scored her first senior international goal on 16 September 2017 in a 6–0 win in the 2019 World Cup qualifier over Slovenia with the opening goal in the 14th minute. At the World Cup finals, she reached the quarterfinals with the national team.

For the 2022 European Championship in England, she was called up to the squad by national coach Martina Voss-Tecklenburg. The German team reached the final, but lost against England and finished as runners-up. Huth was used in all six games. In March 2024, she announced her retirement from international football.

== Personal life ==
Huth has been married her wife Laura since June 2022. They have one child together.

== Career statistics ==
As of 23 February 2024

Appearances and goals by national team and year
National team	Year	Apps	Goals
Germany	2011	1	0
Germany	2012	7	0
Germany	2013	7	0
Germany	2014	1	0
Germany	2016	10	0
Germany	2017	6	3
Germany	2018	9	3
Germany	2019	10	3
Germany	2020	3	1
Germany	2021	9	3
Germany	2022	13	1
Germany	2023	11	0
Germany	2024	1	0
Total		88	14

Scores and results list Germany's goal tally first, score column indicates score after each Huth goal.

List of international goals scored by Svenja Huth
No.	Date	Venue	Opponent	Score	Result	Competition
1	16 September 2017	Ingolstadt, Germany	Slovenia	1–0	6–0	2019 FIFA Women's World Cup qualifying
2	24 November 2017	Bielefeld, Germany	France	2–0	4–0	Friendly
3	24 November 2017	Bielefeld, Germany	France	4–0	4–0	Friendly
4	10 June 2018	Hamilton, Canada	Canada	1–0	3–2	Friendly
5	1 September 2018	Reykjavík, Iceland	Iceland	1–0	2–0	2019 FIFA Women's World Cup qualifying
6	1 September 2018	Reykjavík, Iceland	Iceland	2–0	2–0	2019 FIFA Women's World Cup qualifying
7	9 April 2019	Paderborn, Germany	Japan	2–2	2–2	Friendly
8	31 August 2019	Kassel, Germany	Montenegro	1–0	10–0	UEFA Women's Euro 2021 qualifying
9	3 September 2019	Lviv, Ukraine	Ukraine	6–0	8–0	UEFA Women's Euro 2021 qualifying
10	4 March 2020	Algarve, Portugal	Sweden	1–0	1–0	2020 Algarve Cup
11	21 February 2021	Aachen, Germany	Belgium	1–0	2–0	Friendly
12	21 October 2021	Petah Tikva, Israel	Israel	1–0	1–0	2023 FIFA Women's World Cup qualifying
13	30 November 2021	Faro, Portugal	Portugal	2–0	3–1	2023 FIFA Women's World Cup qualifying
14	6 September 2022	Plovdiv, Bulgaria	Bulgaria	7–0	8–0	2023 FIFA Women's World Cup qualifying

== Honours ==
FFC Frankfurt

- Bundesliga: 2007–08
- UEFA Women's Champions League: 2007–08, 2014–15
- DFB-Pokal: 2007–08, 2010–11, 2013–14

VfL Wolfsburg

- Bundesliga: 2019–20, 2021–22
- UEFA Women's Champions League: runner-up 2019–20, 2022–23
- DFB-Pokal: 2019–20, 2020–21, 2021–22

Germany

- Summer Olympic Games: 2016
- UEFA Women's Championship: 2013, runner-up: 2022
- UEFA Women's Nations League third place: 2023–24
- Algarve Cup: 2012

Germany U17

- UEFA Women's Under-17 Championship: 2008

Germany U20

- FIFA U-20 Women's World Cup: 2010

Individual

- Fritz Walter Medal Gold: 2010
- Silbernes Lorbeerblatt: 2016
- Germany women's national Player of the Year: 2018
