= 2013 UEFA Women's Champions League final =

2013 UEFA Women's Champions League Final
- Event: 2012–13 UEFA Women's Champions League
Wolfsburg	Lyon
(Germany)	(France)
1	0
- Date: 23 May 2013
- Venue: Stamford Bridge, London
- Referee: Teodora Albon (Romania)
- Attendance: 19,278
- Weather: Rainy, 10C

The 2013 UEFA Women's Champions League Final was the final match of the 2012–13 UEFA Women's Champions League, the 12th season of the UEFA Women's Champions League football tournament and the fourth since it was renamed from the UEFA Women's Cup. The match was held at Stamford Bridge in London on 23 May 2013. Wolfsburg won the tournament, surprisingly beating Lyon 1–0 to make their first cup victory.

Lyon played the final for the fourth consecutive time. It also marked the fourth time in a row that a French and a German club met in the final.

== Route to the final ==
Wolfsburg		Round	Lyon
Opponent	Result	2012–13 UEFA Women's Champions League	Opponent	Result
(Poland) Unia Racibórz	5–1, 6–1	Round of 32	(Finland) Pallokerho	7–0, 5–0
(Norway) Røa	4–1, 1–1	Round of 16	(Russia) Krasnogorsk	9–0, 2–0
(Russia) Rossiyanka	2–1, 2–0	Quarterfinals	(Sweden) Malmö	5–0, 3–0
(England) Arsenal	2–0, 2–1	Semifinals	(France) Juvisy	3–0, 6–1

== Match details ==
23 May 2013
19:30 BST

Wolfsburg (Germany)	1–0	(France) Lyon
Müller 73' (pen.)	Report

Stamford Bridge, London
Attendance: 19,278
Referee: Teodora Albon (Romania)

Wolfsburg	Lyon

GK	1	(Germany) Alisa Vetterlein
DF	2	(Germany) Luisa Wensing
DF	27	(Germany) Josephine Henning
DF	28	(Germany) Lena Goeßling
MF	3	(Hungary) Zsanett Jakabfi		(substituted off) 78'
MF	9	(Germany) Anna Blässe
MF	13	(Germany) Nadine Keßler (c)
MF	18	(Germany) Ivonne Hartmann
FW	11	(Germany) Alexandra Popp
FW	25	(Germany) Martina Müller
FW	26	(Germany) Conny Pohlers		(substituted off) 82'
Substitutions:
GK	12	(Germany) Jana Burmeister
DF	5	(Germany) Johanna Tietge
DF	8	(Germany) Eve Chandraratne
DF	17	(Germany) Laura Vetterlein
DF	23	(Germany) Navina Omilade	(yellow card) 90'	(substituted on) 82'
MF	14	(Germany) Lina Magull		(substituted on) 78'
MF	20	(Germany) Stephanie Bunte
Manager:
Ralf Kellermann

GK	26	(France) Sarah Bouhaddi
DF	17	(France) Corine Franco
DF	3	(France) Wendie Renard	(yellow card) 89'
DF	5	(France) Laura Georges
DF	18	(France) Sonia Bompastor (c)
MF	6	(France) Amandine Henry
MF	7	(United States) Megan Rapinoe		(substituted off) 46'
MF	10	(France) Louisa Necib
MF	23	(France) Camille Abily		(substituted off) 67'
FW	12	(France) Élodie Thomis
FW	8	(Sweden) Lotta Schelin
Substitutions:
GK	1	(France) Céline Deville
DF	20	(France) Sabrina Viguier
MF	15	(France) Élise Bussaglia
MF	21	(Switzerland) Lara Dickenmann	(substituted on) 46'	(substituted off) 89'
MF	25	(Tunisia) Amel Majri		(substituted on) 89'
FW	9	(France) Eugénie Le Sommer		(substituted on) 67'
FW	22	(Japan) Ami Otaki
Manager:
Patrice Lair

Assistant referees:
Petruţa Iugulescu (Romania)
Mihaela Gomoescu (Romania)
Fourth official:
Cristina Dorcioman (Romania)

=== Statistics ===
Statistic	Lyon	VfL Wolfsburg
Goals scored	0	1
Total shots	16	6
Shots on target	8	3
Saves	3	2
Ball possession	?	?
Corner kicks	5	3
Fouls committed	8	7
Offsides	2	0
Yellow cards	1	1
Red cards	0	0

== See also ==
- Played between same clubs:
- 2016 UEFA Women's Champions League final
- 2018 UEFA Women's Champions League final
- 2020 UEFA Women's Champions League final
