= List of UEFA Women's Champions League hat-tricks =

Since the rebranding of the UEFA Women's Cup to UEFA Women's Champions League in 2009, 60 players from 24 countries have scored three goals (a hat-trick) or more in a single match on a total of 93 occasions for 30 different clubs from 13 different leagues. The first player to achieve this feat was Kim Little, who scored four times for Arsenal in a 9–0 victory over PAOK on 30 September 2009.

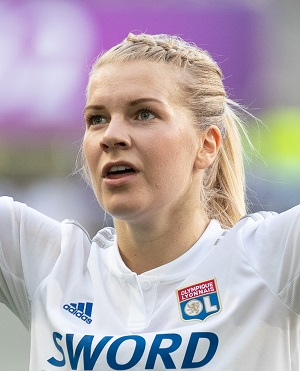
With six hat-tricks, Ada Hegerberg holds the record for scoring most number of hat-tricks in the history of UEFA Women's Champions League. She is also the only player to score a hat-trick in the final of the tournament.

Fourteen players have scored four or more goals in a match; of these, only Inka Grings and Ada Hegerberg have achieved this more than once. Only Grings and Cathrine Paaske Sørensen have scored five goals in a single match. Hegerberg have scored three or more goals on six occasions in the Champions League, more than any other player, followed by Anja Mittag, who have scored four hat-tricks.

Eugénie Le Sommer holds the record for the fastest hat-trick, netting three times for Lyon against Romanian club Olimpia Cluj in seven minutes on 28 September 2011. The youngest scorer of a hat-trick is Magdalena Mayr, who netted three times for Bayern Munich against Viktória Szombathely, aged 17 years and 16 days, on 7 October 2009. The oldest player to score a hat-trick is Patrizia Panico, who was 37 years and 266 days old when she scored three goals for Torres on 31 October 2012 against Olimpia Cluj.

== Hat-tricks ==
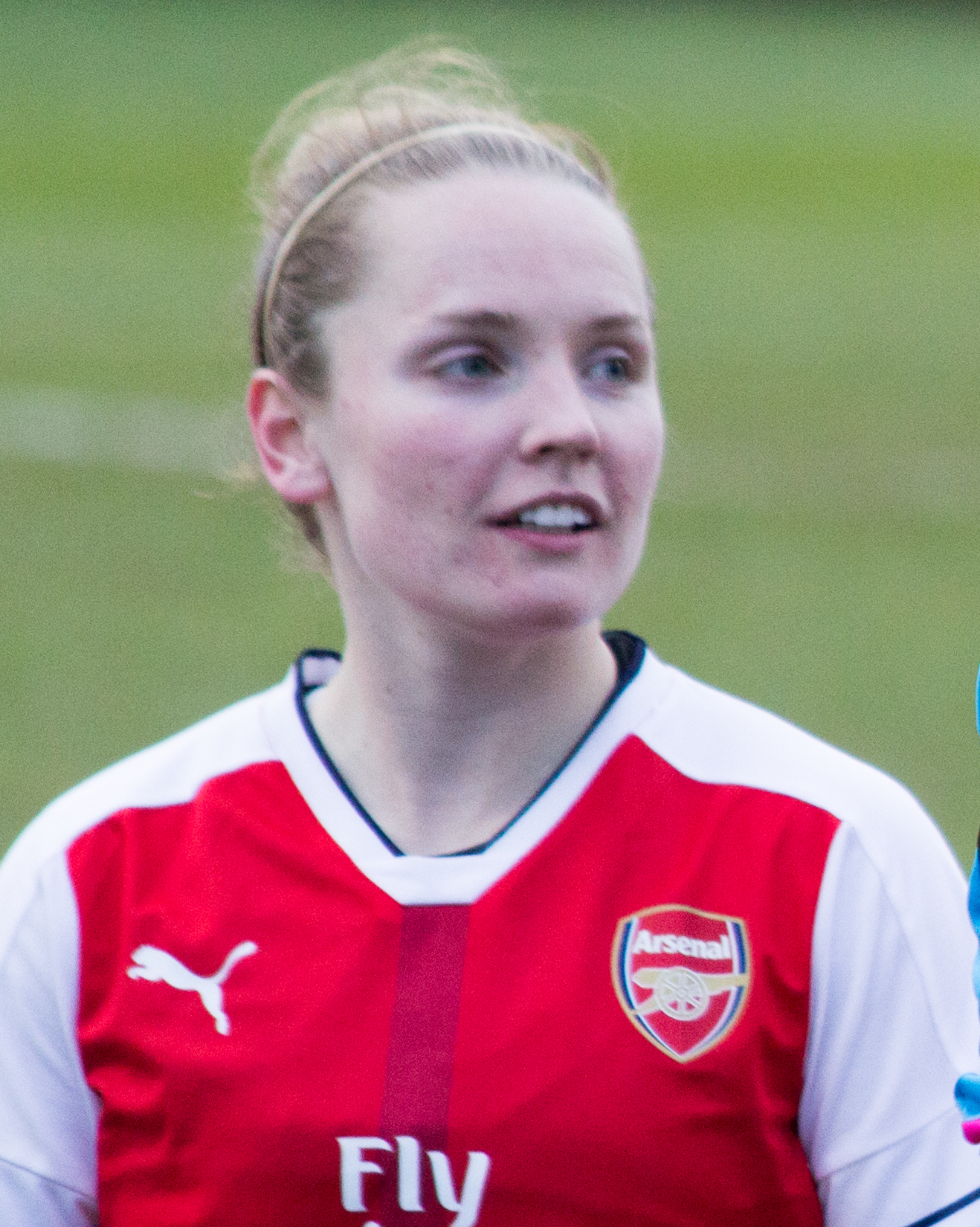
Kim Little is the first player to score a hat-trick in a Champions League match.

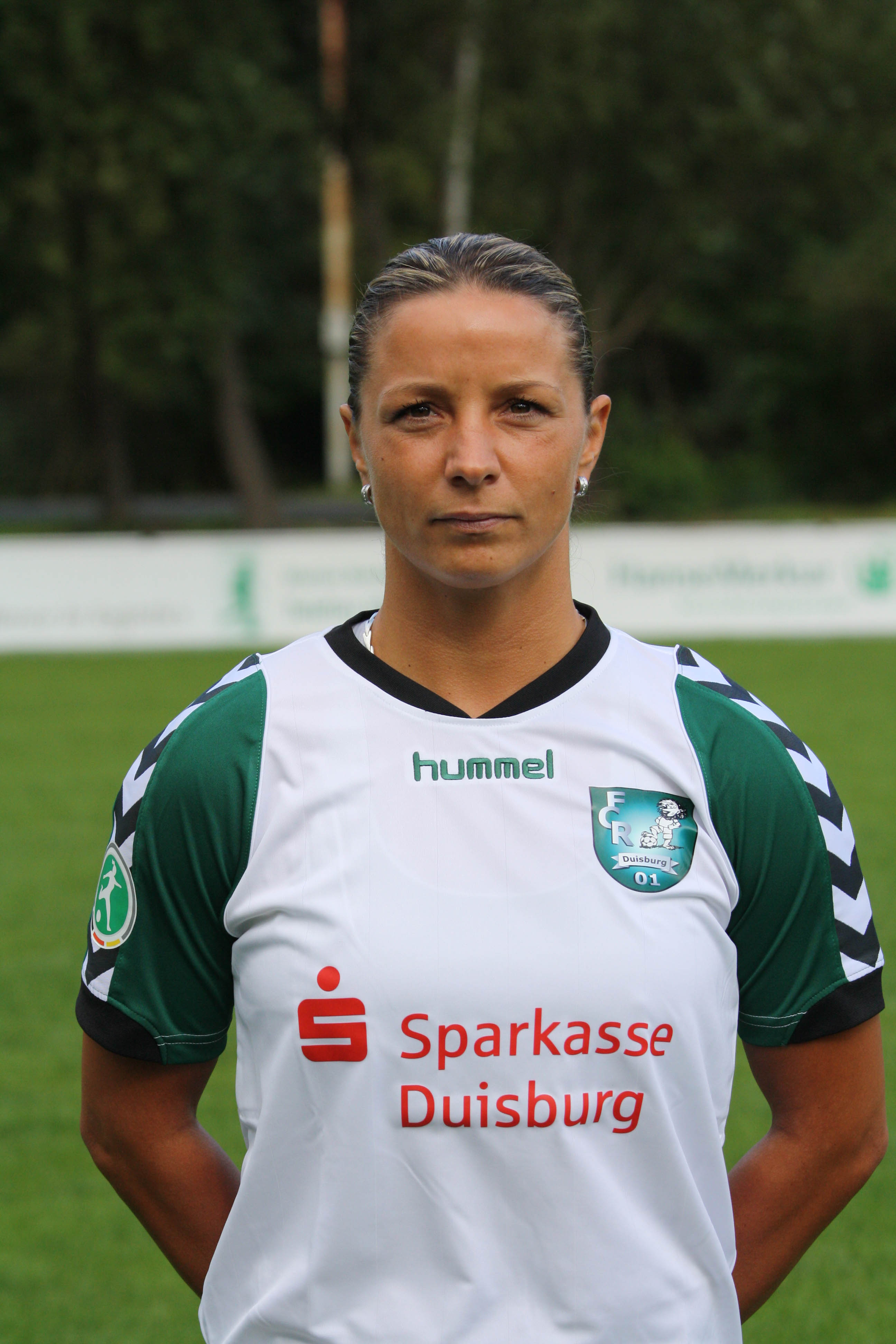
Inka Grings is the first player to score five goals in a Champions League match.

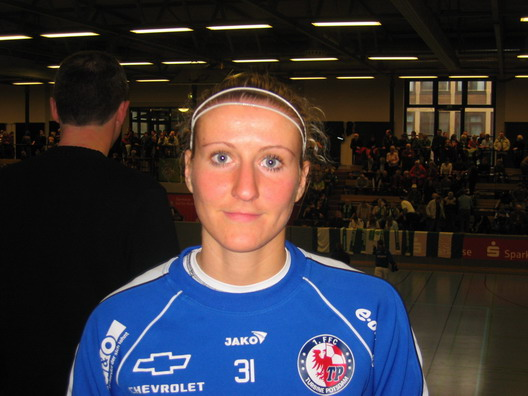
Anja Mittag has scored four Champions League hat-tricks, all for 1. FFC Turbine Potsdam.

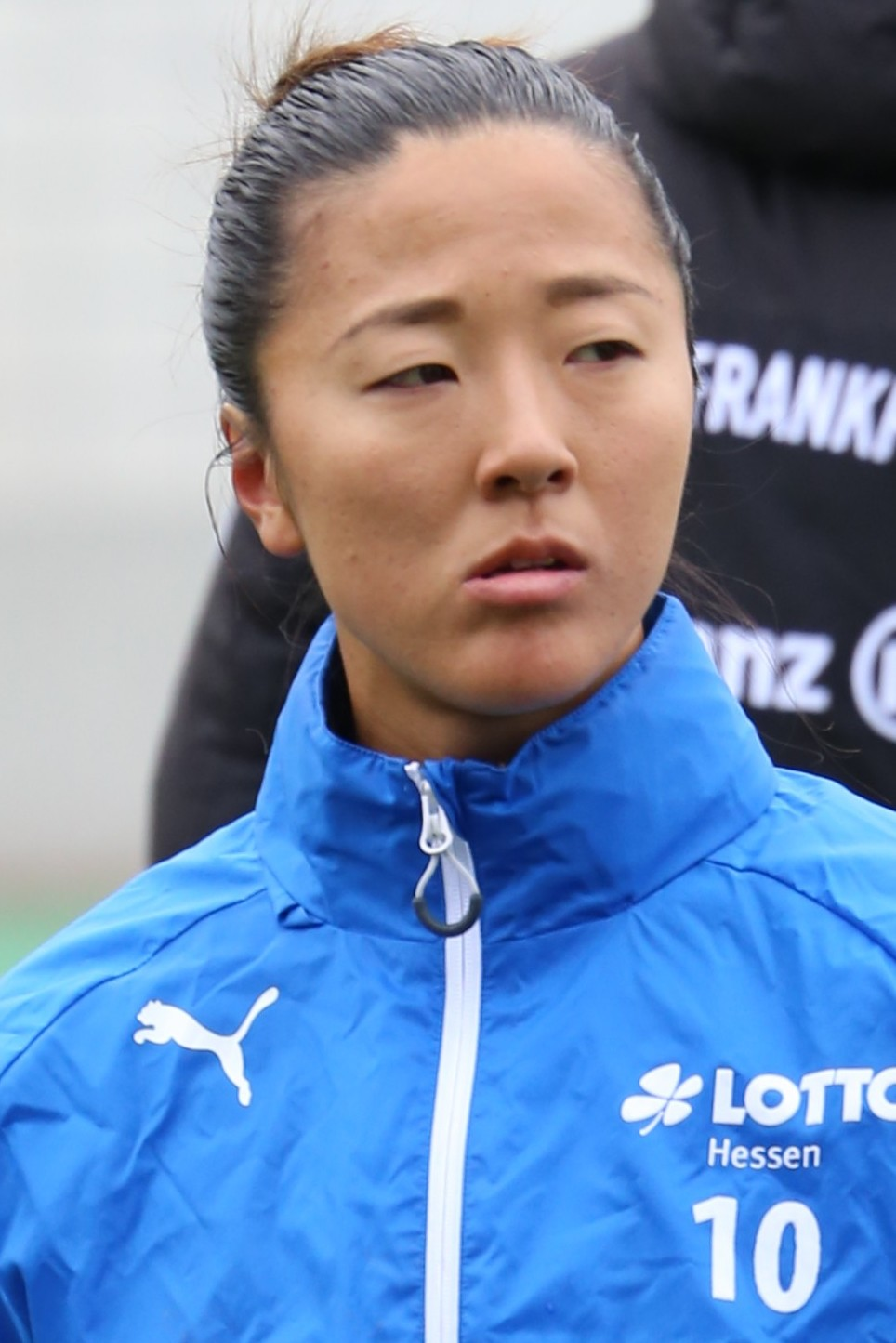
Yūki Nagasato is the first Non-European player to score a Champions League hat-trick.

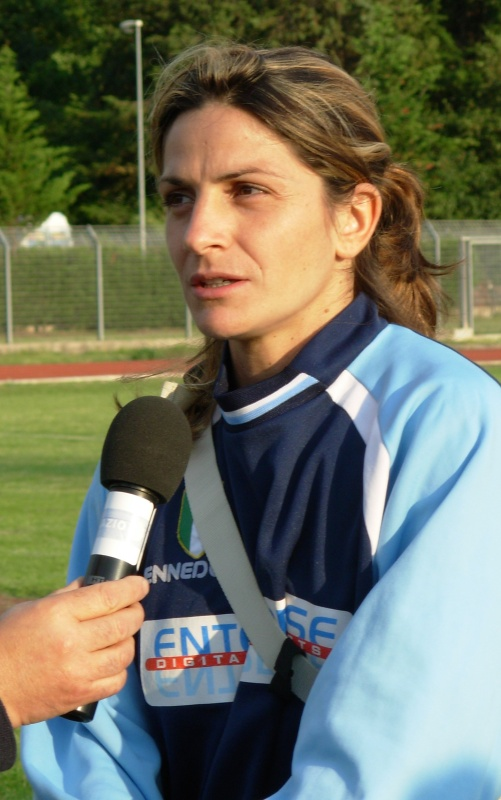
Patrizia Panico is the oldest player to score a Champions League hat-trick.

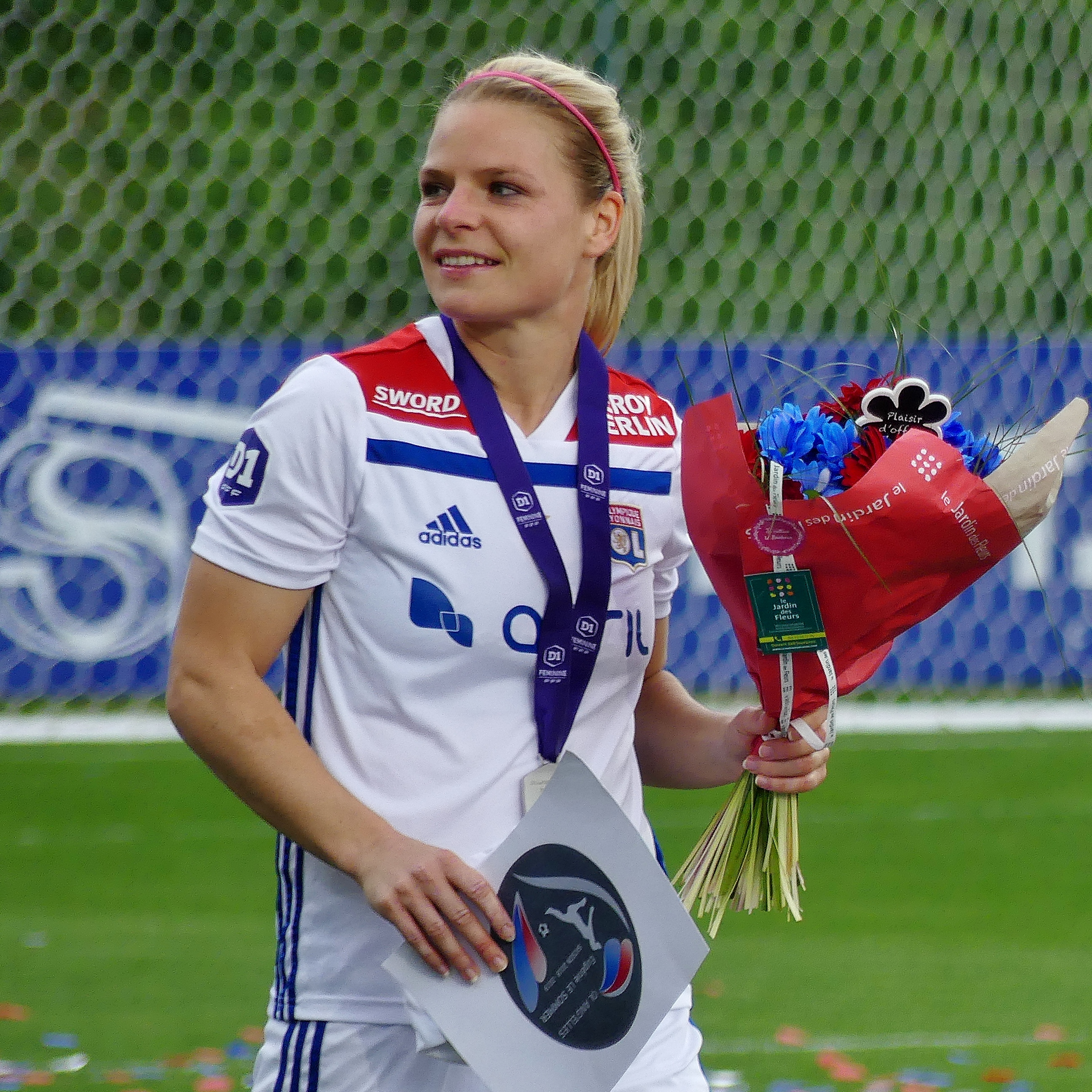
Eugénie Le Sommer scored the fastest ever Champions League hat-trick.

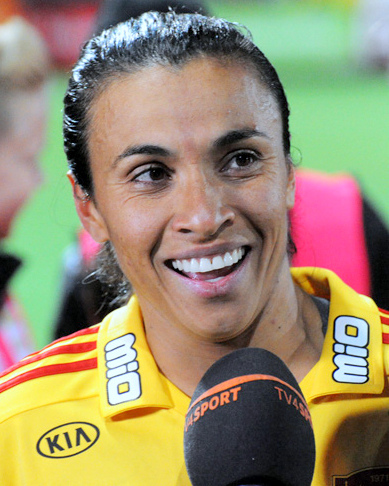
Marta is the first player to score a Champions League hat-trick for more than one club.

As of 19 November 2026

Key
^{4}	Player scored four goals
^{5}	Player scored five goals
()	Number of times player scored a hat-trick (only for players with multiple hat-tricks)

Player	For	Against	Result	Date	Ref
(Scotland) Kim Little (1)^{4}	(England) Arsenal	(Greece) PAOK	9–0	30 September 2009	
(Germany) Anja Mittag (1)	(Germany) 1. FFC Turbine Potsdam	(Finland) Honka	8–1	30 September 2009	
(Scotland) Kim Little (2)	(England) Arsenal	(Greece) PAOK	9–0	7 October 2009	
(Germany) Magdalena Mayr	(Germany) Bayern Munich	(Hungary) Viktória Szombathely	4–2	7 October 2009	
(Germany) Inka Grings (1)^{5}	(Germany) FCR 2001 Duisburg	(Belarus) Universitet Vitebsk	6–3	7 October 2009	
(Germany) Anja Mittag (2)	(Germany) 1. FFC Turbine Potsdam	(Finland) Honka	8–0	7 October 2009	
(Italy) Sandy Iannella	(Italy) Torres	(Austria) SV Neulengbach	4–1	4 November 2009	
(Germany) Anja Mittag (3)	(Germany) 1. FFC Turbine Potsdam	(Finland) Åland United	9–0	22 September 2010	
(Denmark) Cathrine Paaske Sørensen^{5}	(Denmark) Fortuna Hjørring	(Italy) Bardolino Verona	8–0	22 September 2010	
(Germany) Inka Grings (2)^{4}	(Germany) FCR 2001 Duisburg	(Kazakhstan) CSHVSM	5–0	23 September 2010	
(Germany) Inka Grings (3)^{4}	(Germany) FCR 2001 Duisburg	(Kazakhstan) CSHVSM	6–0	13 October 2010	
(Austria) Nina Burger (1)	(Austria) SV Neulengbach	(Greece) PAOK	3–0	13 October 2010	
(Sweden) Lotta Schelin (1)	(France) Lyon	(Netherlands) AZ	8–0	14 October 2010	
(France) Julie Machart	(France) Juvisy	(Iceland) Breiðablik	6–0	14 October 2010	
(England) Brooke Chaplen	(England) Everton	(Hungary) MTK	7–1	14 October 2010	
(Sweden) Lotta Schelin (2)^{4}	(France) Lyon	(Russia) Rossiyanka	6–1	4 November 2010	
(Japan) Yūki Nagasato (1)	(Germany) 1. FFC Turbine Potsdam	(Austria) SV Neulengbach	9–0	10 November 2010	
(France) Eugénie Le Sommer (1)	(France) Lyon	(Romania) Olimpia Cluj	9–0	28 September 2011	
(Japan) Yūki Nagasato (2)	(Germany) 1. FFC Turbine Potsdam	(Iceland) Þór/KA	6–0	28 September 2011	
(Germany) Anja Mittag (4)	(Germany) 1. FFC Turbine Potsdam	(Scotland) Glasgow City	10–0	2 November 2011	
(Sweden) Sofia Jakobsson	(Russia) Rossiyanka	(Russia) Energy Voronezh	4–0	3 November 2011	
(Italy) Patrizia Panico (1)	(Italy) Torres	(Cyprus) Apollon Limassol	3–2	26 September 2012	
(North Macedonia) Nataša Andonova	(Germany) 1. FFC Turbine Potsdam	(Belgium) Standard Liège	5–0	3 October 2012	
(Italy) Cristiana Girelli (1)	(Italy) Bardolino Verona	(England) Birmingham City	3–0	3 October 2012	
(Scotland) Jen Beattie	(England) Arsenal	(Spain) Barcelona	4–0	4 October 2012	
(France) Louisa Nécib	(France) Lyon	(Russia) Zorky Krasnogorsk	9–0	31 October 2012	
(Italy) Patrizia Panico (2)	(Italy) Torres	(Romania) Olimpia Cluj	4–1	31 October 2012	
(England) Kelly Smith	(England) Arsenal	(Germany) 1. FFC Turbine Potsdam	4–3	7 November 2012	
(Russia) Natalia Shlyapina	(Russia) Rossiyanka	(Serbia) Spartak Subotica	4–2	9 October 2013	
(Germany) Lina Magull^{4}	(Germany) VfL Wolfsburg	(Estonia) Pärnu JK	14–0	9 October 2013	
(Germany) Conny Pohlers (1)	(Germany) VfL Wolfsburg	(Estonia) Pärnu JK	14–0	9 October 2013	
(Germany) Martina Müller	(Germany) VfL Wolfsburg	(Estonia) Pärnu JK	14–0	9 October 2013	
(Germany) Lyn Meyer	(Germany) VfL Wolfsburg	(Estonia) Pärnu JK	13–0	16 October 2013	
(Germany) Conny Pohlers (2)	(Germany) VfL Wolfsburg	(Estonia) Pärnu JK	13–0	16 October 2013	
(England) Danielle Carter^{4}	(England) Arsenal	(Kazakhstan) CSHVSM	11–1	17 October 2013	
(Scotland) Kim Little (3)	(England) Arsenal	(Kazakhstan) CSHVSM	11–1	17 October 2013	
(Austria) Nina Burger (2)	(Austria) SV Neulengbach	(Turkey) Konak Belediyespor	3–0	10 November 2013	
(United States) Christen Press	(Sweden) Tyresö	(Austria) SV Neulengbach	8–1	23 March 2014	
(Brazil) Marta (1)	(Sweden) Tyresö	(Austria) SV Neulengbach	8–1	23 March 2014	
(Ivory Coast) Josée Nahi^{4}	(Russia) Zvezda-2005 Perm	(Iceland) Stjarnan	5–2	8 October 2014	
(France) Eugénie Le Sommer (2)	(France) Lyon	(Italy) Brescia	9–0	15 October 2014	
(France) Camille Abily (1)	(France) Lyon	(Italy) Brescia	9–0	15 October 2014	
(Sweden) Fridolina Rolfö	(Sweden) Linköping	(England) Liverpool	3–0	16 October 2014	
(Germany) Mandy Islacker	(Germany) 1. FFC Frankfurt	(England) Bristol Academy	7–0	29 March 2015	
(Germany) Célia Šašić (1)^{4}	(Germany) 1. FFC Frankfurt	(Denmark) Brøndby	7–0	19 April 2015	
(Germany) Célia Šašić (2)	(Germany) 1. FFC Frankfurt	(Denmark) Brøndby	6–0	25 April 2015	
(Spain) Verónica Boquete	(Germany) 1. FFC Frankfurt	(Denmark) Brøndby	6–0	25 April 2015	
(Canada) Josée Bélanger	(Sweden) Rosengård	(Finland) PK-35 Vantaa	7–0	14 October 2015	
(Brazil) Cristiane (1)	(France) Paris Saint-Germain	(Romania) Olimpia Cluj	9–0	14 October 2015	
(Brazil) Marta (2)	(Sweden) Rosengård	(Italy) AGSM Verona	5–1	19 November 2015	
(Canada) Adriana Leon	(Switzerland) Zürich	(Austria) Sturm Graz	6–0	5 October 2016	
(Hungary) Zsanett Jakabfi (1)	(Germany) VfL Wolfsburg	(England) Chelsea	3–0	5 October 2016	
(Brazil) Cristiane (2)	(France) Paris Saint-Germain	(Norway) LSK Kvinner	4–1	13 October 2016	
(Norway) Ada Hegerberg (1)	(France) Lyon	(Switzerland) Zürich	8–0	9 November 2016	
(Hungary) Zsanett Jakabfi (2)^{4}	(Germany) VfL Wolfsburg	(Sweden) Eskilstuna United	5–1	10 November 2016	
(Norway) Ada Hegerberg (2)	(France) Lyon	(Poland) Medyk Konin	5–0	4 October 2017	
(Czech Republic) Irena Martínková	(Czech Republic) Sparta Prague	(Greece) PAOK	5–0	4 October 2017	
(Germany) Alexandra Popp (1)	(Germany) VfL Wolfsburg	(Spain) Atlético Madrid	12–2	11 October 2017	
(Czech Republic) Kateřina Svitková	(Czech Republic) Slavia Prague	(Belarus) FC Minsk	4–3	11 October 2017	
(France) Wendie Renard (1)	(France) Lyon	(Poland) Medyk Konin	9–0	11 October 2017	
(Scotland) Abbi Grant	(Scotland) Glasgow City	(Kazakhstan) BIIK Kazygurt	4–1	12 October 2017	
(Norway) Ada Hegerberg (3)^{4}	(France) Lyon	(Kazakhstan) BIIK Kazygurt	7–0	8 November 2017	
(Norway) Ada Hegerberg (4)^{4}	(France) Lyon	(Kazakhstan) BIIK Kazygurt	9–0	15 November 2017	
(France) Camille Abily (2)	(France) Lyon	(Kazakhstan) BIIK Kazygurt	9–0	15 November 2017	
(Norway) Frida Maanum (1)	(Sweden) Linköping	(Ukraine) Zhytlobud-1 Kharkiv	6–1	12 September 2018	
(Czech Republic) Tereza Kožárová (1)	(Czech Republic) Slavia Prague	(Lithuania) FC Gintra	4–0	27 September 2018	
(Switzerland) Fabienne Humm	(Switzerland) Zürich	(Finland) Honka	5–1	27 September 2018	
(England) Fran Kirby	(England) Chelsea	(Italy) Fiorentina	6–0	31 October 2018	
(Norway) Ada Hegerberg (5)	(France) Lyon	(Spain) Barcelona	4–1	18 May 2019	
(Norway) Ada Hegerberg (6)	(France) Lyon	(Russia) Ryazan-VDV	9–0	11 September 2019	
(France) Wendie Renard (2)	(France) Lyon	(Russia) Ryazan-VDV	9–0	11 September 2019	
(Denmark) Pernille Harder (1)	(Germany) VfL Wolfsburg	(Kosovo) Mitrovica	10–0	11 September 2019	
(Netherlands) Fenna Kalma	(Netherlands) Twente	(Austria) St. Pölten	4–2	11 September 2019	
(Czech Republic) Tereza Kožárová (2)	(Czech Republic) Slavia Prague	(Scotland) Hibernian	4–1	11 September 2019	
(France) Marie-Antoinette Katoto (1)	(France) Paris Saint-Germain	(Portugal) Braga	7–0	12 September 2019	
(Canada) Janine Beckie	(England) Manchester City	(Switzerland) Lugano	4–0	25 September 2019	
(Netherlands) Vivianne Miedema (1)^{4}	(England) Arsenal	(Czech Republic) Slavia Prague	5–2	16 October 2019	
(Netherlands) Daniëlle van de Donk	(England) Arsenal	(Czech Republic) Slavia Prague	8–0	31 October 2019	
(Netherlands) Vivianne Miedema (2)	(England) Arsenal	(Czech Republic) Slavia Prague	8–0	31 October 2019	
(Denmark) Pernille Harder (2)^{4}	(Germany) VfL Wolfsburg	(Scotland) Glasgow City	9–1	21 August 2020	
(Serbia) Jelena Čanković	(Sweden) Rosengård	(Georgia (country)) Lanchkhuti	10–0	16 December 2020	
(Spain) Jennifer Hermoso	(Spain) Barcelona	(Denmark) Fortuna Hjørring	4–0	3 March 2021	
(Canada) Jordyn Huitema	(France) Paris Saint-Germain	(Ukraine) Zhytlobud-1 Kharkiv	5–0	13 October 2021	
(Denmark) Caroline Møller	(Spain) Real Madrid	(Iceland) Breiðablik	5–0	13 October 2021	
(Australia) Sam Kerr (1)^{4}	(England) Chelsea	(Albania) Vllaznia	8–0	26 October 2022	
(Denmark) Pernille Harder (3)	(England) Chelsea	(Albania) Vllaznia	8–0	26 October 2022	
(Italy) Cristiana Girelli (2)^{4}	(Italy) Juventus	(Switzerland) Zürich	5–0	15 December 2022	
(Norway) Frida Maanum (2)	(England) Arsenal	(Switzerland) Zürich	9–1	21 December 2022	
(Australia) Sam Kerr (2)	(England) Chelsea	(France) Paris FC	4–1	23 November 2023	
(Denmark) Pernille Harder (4)	(Germany) Bayern Munich	(England) Arsenal	5–2	9 October 2024	
(Sweden) Rebecka Blomqvist	(Germany) VfL Wolfsburg	(Turkey) Galatasaray	5–0	13 November 2024	
(Germany) Alexandra Popp (2)	(Germany) VfL Wolfsburg	(Turkey) Galatasaray	5–0	20 November 2024	
(Iceland) Sveindís Jane Jónsdóttir^{4}	(Germany) VfL Wolfsburg	(Italy) Roma	6–1	11 December 2024	
(Canada) Evelyne Viens	(Italy) Roma	(Austria) St. Pölten	6–1	17 December 2025	
(France) Marie-Antoinette Katoto (2)	(France) OL Lyonnes	(Switzerland) Servette Chênois	8–0	23 September 2026	
(England) Alessia Russo	(England) Arsenal	(Portugal) Benfica	3–0	28 October 2026	
(France) Vicki Bècho	(France) OL Lyonnes	(Italy) Inter Milan	6–0	28 October 2026	
(Spain) Clàudia Pina	(Spain) Barcelona	(Switzerland) Servette Chênois	6–0	19 November 2026	

== Multiple hat-tricks ==
The following table lists the number of hat-tricks scored by players who have scored two or more hat-tricks. Boldface indicates a player who is currently active.

Rank	Player	Hat-tricks
1	(Norway) **Ada Hegerberg**	6
2	(Germany) Anja Mittag	4
2	(Denmark) **Pernille Harder**	4
4	(Germany) Inka Grings	3
4	(Scotland) **Kim Little**	3
6	(France) Camille Abily	2
6	(France) **Marie-Antoinette Katoto**	2
6	(Austria) Nina Burger	2
6	(Brazil) Cristiane	2
6	(Italy) **Cristiana Girelli**	2
6	(Hungary) Zsanett Jakabfi	2
6	(Australia) Sam Kerr	2
6	(Czech Republic) Tereza Kožárová	2
6	(France) Eugénie Le Sommer	2
6	(Norway) **Frida Maanum**	2
6	(Brazil) Marta	2
6	(Netherlands) **Vivianne Miedema**	2
6	(Japan) Yūki Nagasato	2
6	(Italy) Patrizia Panico	2
6	(Germany) Conny Pohlers	2
6	(Germany) Alexandra Popp	2
6	(France) **Wendie Renard**	2
6	(Germany) Célia Šašić	2
6	(Sweden) Lotta Schelin	2

== Hat-tricks by nationality ==
As of 19 November 2026

The following table lists the number of hat-tricks scored by players from a single nation.

Champions League hat-tricks by nationality
Rank	Nation	Hat-tricks	Last hat-trick
1	Germany	18	20 November 2024
2	France	11	28 October 2026
3	Norway	8	21 December 2022
4	Denmark	7	9 October 2024
5	Canada	5	17 December 2025
5	England	5	28 October 2026
5	Italy	5	15 December 2022
5	Scotland	5	12 October 2017
5	Sweden	5	13 November 2024
10	Brazil	4	13 October 2016
10	Czechia	4	11 September 2019
10	Netherlands	4	31 October 2019
13	Spain	3	19 November 2026
14	Australia	2	23 November 2023
14	Austria	2	13 October 2010
14	Hungary	2	10 November 2016
14	Japan	2	28 September 2011
18	Iceland	1	11 December 2024
18	Ivory Coast	1	8 October 2014
18	North Macedonia	1	3 October 2012
18	Russia	1	9 October 2013
18	Serbia	1	16 December 2020
18	Switzerland	1	27 September 2018
18	United States	1	23 March 2014

== Hat-tricks by club ==
As of 19 November 2026

The following table lists the number of hat-tricks scored by players from given club.

Champions League hat-tricks by club
Rank	Club	Hat-tricks	Last hat-trick
1	(France) OL Lyonnes	17	28 October 2026
2	(Germany) VfL Wolfsburg	13	11 December 2024
3	(England) Arsenal	11	28 October 2026
4	(Germany) 1. FFC Turbine Potsdam	7	3 October 2012
5	(England) Chelsea	4	23 November 2023
5	(France) PSG	4	13 October 2021
5	(Germany) 1. FFC Frankfurt	4	25 April 2015
8	(Czech Republic) Slavia Prague	3	11 September 2019
8	(Germany) FCR 2001 Duisburg	3	13 October 2010
8	(Italy) Torres	3	31 October 2012
8	(Sweden) FC Rosengård	3	16 December 2020
12	(Austria) SV Neulengbach	2	10 November 2013
12	(Russia) Rossiyanka	2	9 October 2013
12	(Sweden) Linköping FC	2	12 September 2018
12	(Sweden) Tyresö FF	2	23 March 2014
12	(Switzerland) Zürich	2	27 September 2018
12	(Germany) Bayern Munich	2	9 October 2024
12	(Spain) Barcelona	2	19 November 2026
19	(Czech Republic) Sparta Prague	1	10 November 2013
19	(Denmark) Fortuna Hjørring	1	22 September 2010
19	(England) Everton	1	14 October 2010
19	(England) Manchester City	1	25 September 2019
19	(France) Juvicy	1	14 October 2010
19	(Italy) Bardolino Verona	1	3 October 2012
19	(Italy) Juventus	1	15 December 2022
19	(Italy) Roma	1	17 December 2025
19	(Netherlands) Twente	1	11 September 2019
19	(Russia) Zvezda-2005 Perm	1	8 October 2014
19	(Scotland) Glasgow City	1	12 October 2017
19	(Spain) Real Madrid	1	13 October 2021

== See also ==
- List of UEFA Champions League hat-tricks
- List of UEFA Women's Cup and UEFA Women's Champions League records and statistics
