= Eve Chandraratne =

German footballer (born 1989)

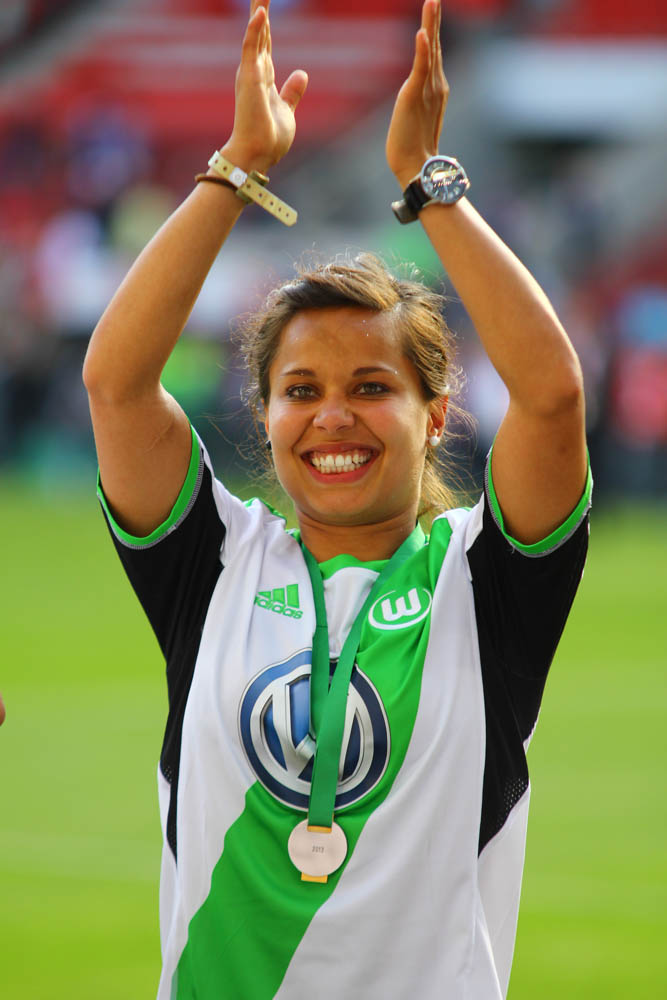
- Chandraratne after winning the DFB-Pokal in 2013

Personal information
- Date of birth: 20 June 1989 (age 37)
- Place of birth: Stuttgart, Germany
- Height: 1.57 m (5 ft 2 in)
- Position: Midfielder

Team information
- Current team: Wolfsburg

Eve Chandraratne (born 20 June 1989) is a German footballer who plays as a midfielder.

== International career ==
Chandraratne represented Germany at youth level.

== Personal life ==
Chandraratne's father is from Sri Lanka and her mother is German. Since 2014 Chandraratne has been a trained doctor. Since the age of four Eve Chandraratne has trained also a classical pianist.

== Honours ==
VfL Wolfsburg

- Bundesliga: 2012–13
- UEFA Women's Champions League: 2012–13
- DFB-Pokal: 2012–13
