= Jana Burmeister =

German footballer (born 1989)

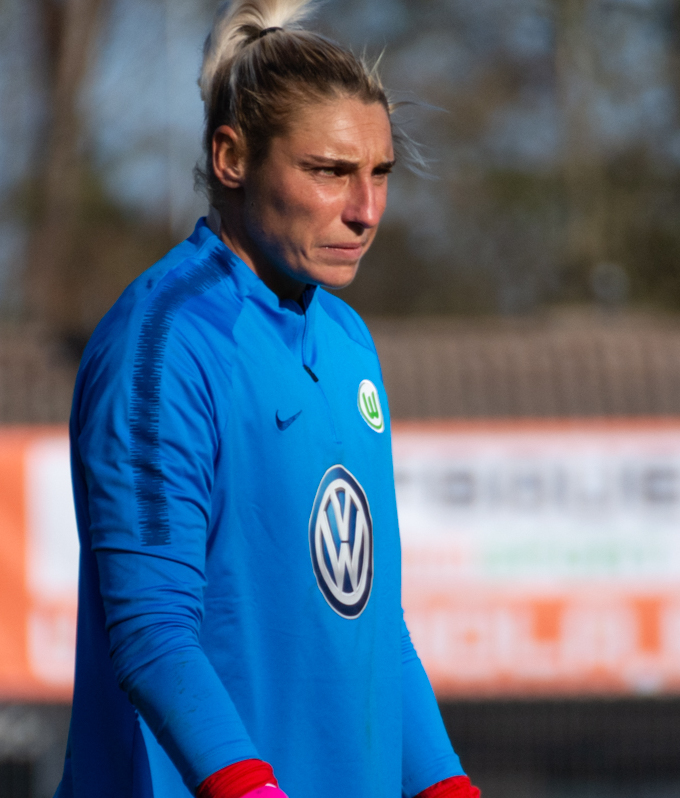

Personal information
- Full name: Jana Burmeister
- Date of birth: 6 March 1989 (age 37)
- Place of birth: Sonneberg, East Germany
- Height: 1.80 m (5 ft 11 in)
- Position: Goalkeeper

Youth career
- SG 1951 Sonneberg
- SG Spielzeugstadt Sonneberg
- –2003: SC 1903 Weimar
- 2003–2005: FF USV Jena

Senior career*
Years	Team	Apps	(Gls)
2005–2011	FF USV Jena	113	(0)
2011–2020	Wolfsburg	3	(0)

International career
2004	Germany U-14	2	(0)
2005–2006	Germany U-17	13	(0)
2006–2007	Germany U-19	14	(0)
- * Club domestic league appearances and goals as of 26 May 2011

Jana Burmeister (born 6 March 1989 in Sonneberg) is a German football goalkeeper. She started her senior career at FF USV Jena and from 2005 to 2011 played 53 2nd Bundesliga and 60 Bundesliga games. In 2011, she transferred to Wolfsburg.

== Honours ==
FF USV Jena

- DFB-Pokal: Runner-up 2009–10

VfL Wolfsburg

- Bundesliga: Winner (3) 2012-2013, 2013-2014, 2016-2017
- DFB-Pokal: Winner (4) 2012-2013, 2014-2015, 2015-2016, 2016-2017
- UEFA Women's Champions League: Winner (2) 2012-2013, 2013-2014
