= Luisa Wensing =

German footballer (born 1993)

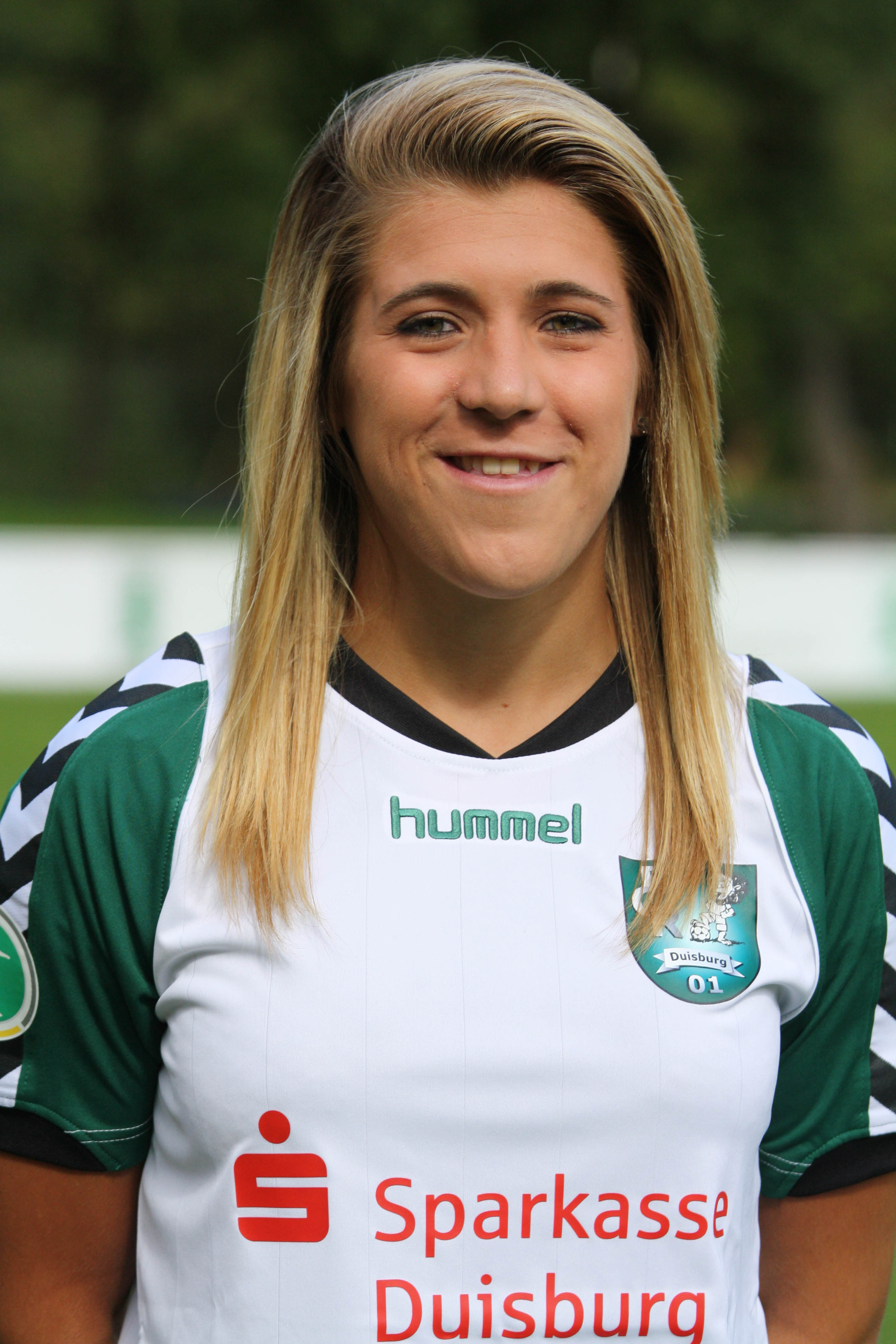
- Wensing with FCR Duisburg in 2011

Personal information
- Full name: Luisa Wensing
- Date of birth: 8 February 1993 (age 33)
- Place of birth: Goch, Germany
- Height: 1.73 m (5 ft 8 in)
- Position: Right back

Youth career
- 1998–2008: Rheinwacht Erfgen
- 2008–2009: FCR 2001 Duisburg

Senior career*
Years	Team	Apps	(Gls)
2009–2012	FCR 2001 Duisburg	55	(5)
2012–2018	VfL Wolfsburg	58	(3)
2019–2020	Werder Bremen	38	(0)
2020–2024	SC Freiburg	35	(0)

International career
2008	Germany U15	5	(0)
2009–2010	Germany U17	15	(0)
2011	Germany U19	8	(2)
2012	Germany U20	11	(2)
2011–2015	Germany	22	(1)
Medal record
Women's football
Representing Germany
UEFA Women's Championship
Gold medal – first place	2013 Sweden	Team
- * Club domestic league appearances and goals

Luisa Wensing (born 8 February 1993) is a former German footballer who played as a right back.

Wensing has also represented Germany in international competitions, playing at junior level in the 2010 FIFA U-17 Women's World Cup and 2012 FIFA U-20 Women's World Cup. She made her debut with the full national team in 2012 against China.

== International career ==
Wensing made her debut for the senior national team on 2 March 2012 as a substitute in a match against China in the 2012 Algarve Cup. Her first goal for the senior team came on 30 October 2013 against Croatia in a 2015 FIFA Women's World Cup qualification match.

== Career statistics ==
Scores and results list Germany's goal tally first, score column indicates score after each Wensing goal.

List of international goals scored by Luisa Wensing
No.	Date	Venue	Opponent	Score	Result	Competition
1	30 October 2013	Frankfurt, Germany	Croatia	4–0	4–0	2015 FIFA Women's World Cup qualification

== Honours ==
FCR 2001 Duisburg

- Bundesliga: runner-up 2009–10
- DFB-Pokal: 2009–10

VfL Wolfsburg

- Bundesliga: 2012–13, 2013–14, 2016–17
- UEFA Women's Champions League: 2012–13, 2013–14
- DFB-Pokal: 2012–13, 2014–15, 2015–16, 2016–17

Germany

- UEFA Women's Championship: 2013
- UEFA U-17 Women's Championship: 2009
- UEFA U-19 Women's Championship: 2011
- FIFA U-20 Women's World Cup: runner-up 2012
- Algarve Cup: 2014
