= Anna Blässe =

German footballer (born 1987)

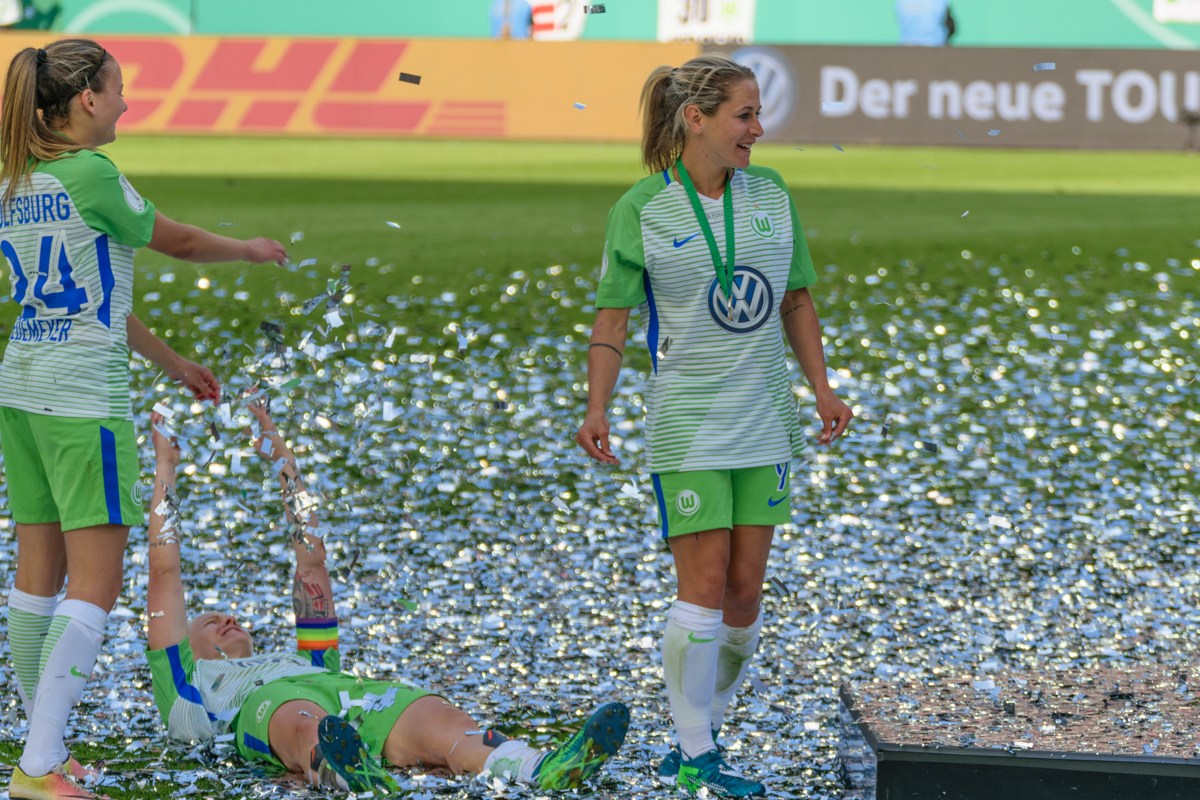
- Blässe (on the right side in the pic) after winning the DFB-Pokal 2018

Personal information
- Date of birth: 27 February 1987 (age 39)
- Place of birth: Weimar, East Germany
- Height: 1.67 m (5 ft 6 in)
- Position: Striker

Senior career*
Years	Team	Apps	(Gls)
2004–2006	FF USV Jena		
2006–2007	Hamburger SV	17	(1)
2007–2022	VfL Wolfsburg	235	(19)
2022–2024	Grasshoppers	18	(1)

International career^{‡}
2015–2018	Germany	27	(0)
- * Club domestic league appearances and goals as of 13 April 2024 ‡ National team caps and goals as of 7 April 2018

Anna Blässe (born 27 February 1987) is a former German football striker playing most recently for Grasshoppers.

== Career ==
She previously played for VfL Wolfsburg, USV Jena and Hamburger SV.

As a junior international she won the 2004 U-19 World Championship and the 2006 U-19 European Championship.

== Personal ==
She is openly lesbian and married her former teammate Lara Dickenmann

== Honours ==
=== Domestic ===
- Bundesliga: Winner 2012-13, 2013-14, 2016-17, 2017-18, 2018-19, 2019-20
- DFB-Pokal: Winner 2012-13, 2014-15, 2015-16, 2016-17, 2017-18, 2018-19, 2019-20

=== International ===
- UEFA Women's Champions League: Winner 2012-2013, 2013-2014
- UEFA Women's Championship: Winner 2013
- FIFA U-20 Women's World Cup: Winner 2004
- UEFA Women's Under-19 Championship: Winner 2006

=== Individual ===
- FIFA U-20 Women's World Cup Bronze Shoe: 2006
- Fritz Walter Medal: Gold 2006
