= Pauline Bremer =

German footballer (born 1996)

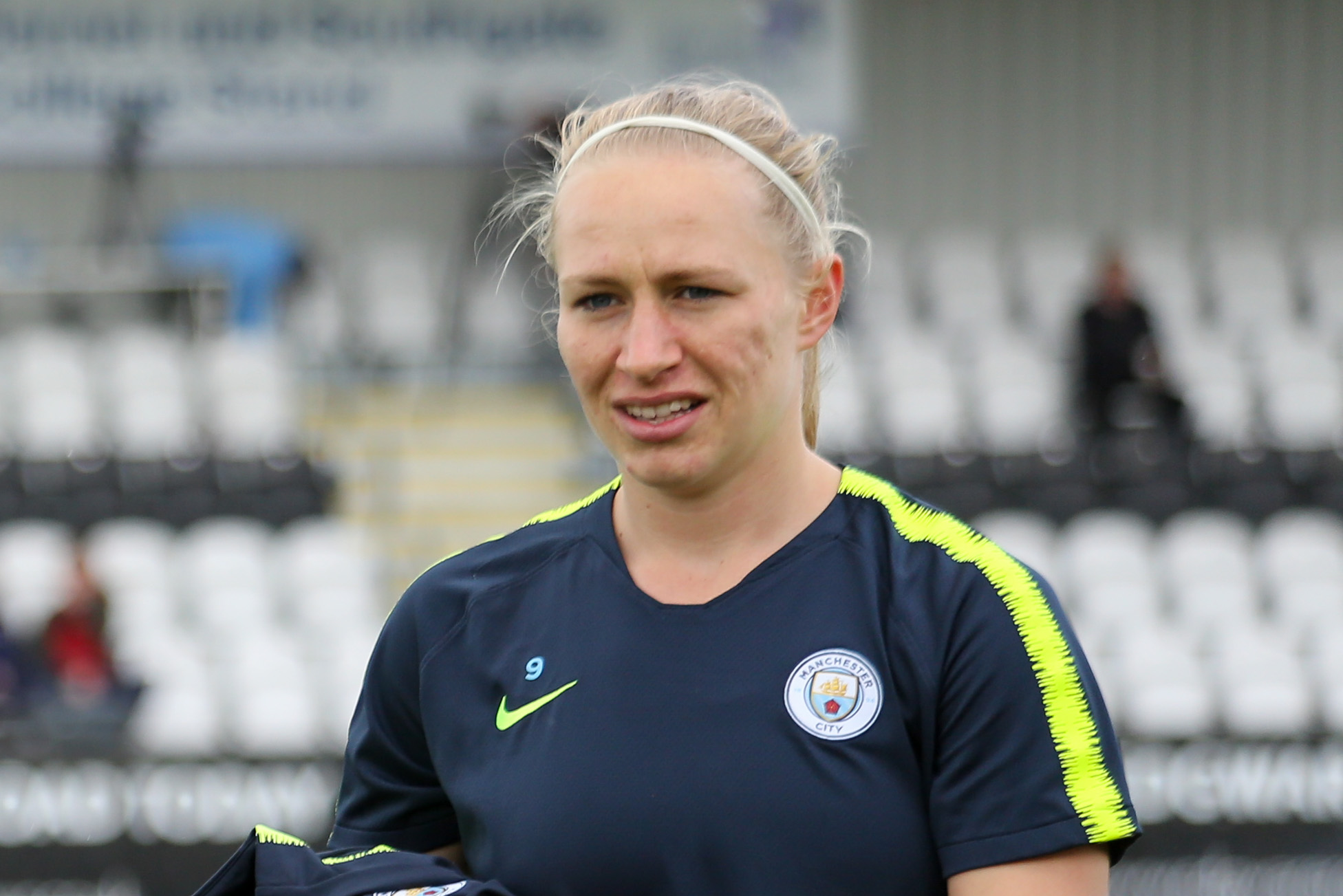
- Bremer in 2019

Personal information
- Full name: Pauline Marie Bremer
- Date of birth: 10 April 1996 (age 30)
- Place of birth: Ossenfeld, Germany
- Height: 1.71 m (5 ft 7 1/2 in)
- Positions: Midfielder; striker

Team information
- Current team: 1. FC Köln
- Number: 9

Youth career
- 2005–2012: SVG Göttingen 07
- 2012–2013: 1. FFC Turbine Potsdam

Senior career*
Years	Team	Apps	(Gls)
2012	1. FFC Turbine Potsdam II	6	(1)
2012–2015	1. FFC Turbine Potsdam	48	(14)
2015–2017	Lyon	28	(9)
2017–2020	Manchester City	18	(11)
2020–2023	VfL Wolfsburg	24	(13)
2023–2025	Brighton & Hove Albion	33	(3)
2025–	1. FC Köln	32	(10)

International career
2010–2011	Germany U15	4	(1)
2011	Germany U16	1	(0)
2012–2013	Germany U17	16	(5)
2013	Germany U19	6	(11)
2014	Germany U20	10	(10)
2014–2020	Germany	21	(4)
Medal record
Women's football
Representing Germany
FIFA U-20 Women's World Cup
Winner	2014 Canada
UEFA Women's Under-17 Championship
Winner	2012 Switzerland
- * Club domestic league appearances and goals as of 21 November 2026

Pauline Marie Bremer (German: [paʊˈliːnə maˈʁiː ˈbʁeːmɐ]; born 10 April 1996) is a German professional footballer who plays as a forward for Frauen-Bundesliga club 1. FC Köln.

== Club career ==
=== Early career ===
Pauline Bremer began her junior career at SVG Göttingen 07 before signing a senior contract with 1. FFC Turbine Potsdam in 2012. On 1 June 2015, it was announced that she would join Lyon for the 2015–16 season on a two-year contract.

=== Manchester City ===
Bremer joined Manchester City in 2017 as part of an exchange deal that saw defender Lucy Bronze join Lyon. She started her first game for Manchester on 7 October against Everton and she scored a goal in the 18th minute. However, late in the first half Bremer suffered a broken leg, which ruled her out for 13 months. She made her return for Manchester City on 5 December 2018 in a 6–0 Continental Cup win against Sheffield United. In February 2020, Manchester City announced that Bremer was to leave at the end of the 2019–20 season and return to Germany with VfL Wolfsburg.

=== Brighton & Hove Albion ===
On 19 June 2023, it was announced that Bremer signed a two-year contract to player for WSL side Brighton & Hove Albion in England.

On 5 May 2025, it was announced that Bremer would be leaving Brighton when her contract expires in June 2025.

== International career ==
Bremer was part of the Germany U17 that won the 2012 U-17 European Championship. She won the top scorer prize in the 2013 UEFA U-19 European Championship by scoring six goals.

She was called up to be part of the Germany U20 team for the 2014 U-20 World Cup. With five goals from Bremer in the tournament, the Germany team won the U-20 Women's World Cup trophy.

Bremer made her debut for the senior national team on her 18th birthday in a World Cup qualifier against Slovenia. She came on as a substitute for Célia Šašić in the 60th minute.

Bremer played in three matches for Germany during qualifying for Euro 2017, but she was not named to the final tournament roster. After missing significant time due to injury, Bremer returned to the German national team in April 2019.

== Career statistics ==
=== Club ===
As of match played 21 November 2026

Appearances and goals by club, season and competition
Club	Season	League			National cup (Note: Includes Women's FA Cup, DFB Pokal, Coupe de France)		League cup (Note: Includes FA WSL Cup)		Continental		Total	
Club	Season	Division	Apps	Goals	Apps	Goals	Apps	Goals	Apps	Goals	Apps	Goals
Turbine Potsdam	2012–13	Frauen-Bundesliga	11	3	2	1	—		—		13	4
Turbine Potsdam	2013–14	Frauen-Bundesliga	20	7	1	0	—		8 (Note: Appearances in UEFA Women's Champions League)	1	29	8
Turbine Potsdam	2014–15	Frauen-Bundesliga	17	4	4	8	—		—		21	12
Turbine Potsdam	Total		48	14	7	9	—		8	1	63	24
Lyon	2015–16	D1 Féminine	10	5	3	0	—		7	2	20	7
Lyon	2016–17	D1 Féminine	18	4	3	5	—		7	0	28	9
Lyon	Total		28	9	6	5	—		14	2	48	16
Manchester City	2017–18	FA WSL	2	1	0	0	0	0	1	0	3	1
Manchester City	2018–19	FA WSL	4	0	2	1	3	0	0	0	9	1
Manchester City	2019–20	FA WSL	12	10	1	3	6	5	3	4	22	22
Manchester City	Total		18	11	3	4	9	5	4	4	34	24
VfL Wolfsburg	2019–20	Frauen-Bundesliga	—		—		—		3	0	3	0
VfL Wolfsburg	2020–21	Frauen-Bundesliga	4	2	3	0	—		0	0	7	2
VfL Wolfsburg	2021–22	Frauen-Bundesliga	11	6	1	0	—		6	0	18	6
VfL Wolfsburg	2022–23	Frauen-Bundesliga	9	5	1	0	—		5	2	15	7
VfL Wolfsburg	Total		24	13	5	0	—		14	2	43	15
Brighton & Hove Albion	2023–24	WSL	16	2	2	1	2	0	—		20	3
Brighton & Hove Albion	2024–25	WSL	17	1	2	0	3	1	—		22	2
Brighton & Hove Albion	Total		33	3	4	1	5	1	—		42	5
1. FC Köln	2025–26	Frauen-Bundesliga	21	6	1	0	—		—		22	6
1. FC Köln	2026–27	Frauen-Bundesliga	11	4	2	2	—		—		13	6
1. FC Köln	Total		32	10	3	2	0	0	0	0	35	12
Career total			183	60	28	21	14	6	40	9	265	96

=== International ===
As of match played 8 March 2020

Appearances and goals by national team and year
National team	Year	Apps	Goals
Germany	2014	4	0
Germany	2015	4	3
Germany	2016	3	0
Germany	2017	4	0
Germany	2018	0	0
Germany	2019	4	1
Germany	2020	2	0
Total		21	4

Scores and results list Germany's goal tally first, score column indicates score after each Bremer goal.

List of international goals scored by Pauline Bremer
No.	Date	Venue	Opponent	Score	Result	Competition	Ref.
1	18 September 2015	Leuna Chemie Stadion, Halle, Germany	Hungary	5–0	12–0	UEFA Women's Euro 2017 qualifying	
2	18 September 2015	Leuna Chemie Stadion, Halle, Germany	Hungary	10–0	12–0	UEFA Women's Euro 2017 qualifying	
3	18 September 2015	Leuna Chemie Stadion, Halle, Germany	Hungary	12–0	12–0	UEFA Women's Euro 2017 qualifying	
4.	8 October 2019	Kleanthis Vikelidis Stadium, Thessaloniki, Greece	Greece	4–0	5–0	UEFA Women's Euro 2022 qualifying	

== Honours ==
1. FFC Turbine Potsdam

- DFB-Pokal runner-up: 2012–13, 2014–15
- DFB-Hallenpokal: 2013, 2014

Lyon

- Division 1 Féminine: 2015–16, 2016–17
- Coupe de France Féminine: 2015–16, 2016–17
- UEFA Women's Champions League: 2015–16, 2016–17

Manchester City

- FA WSL Cup: 2018–19
- FA Women's Cup: 2018–19

Germany U17

- UEFA U-17 European Championship: 2012

Germany U20

- FIFA U-20 World Cup: 2014

Individual

- FIFA U-20 World Cup Silver Shoe: 2014
- UEFA U-19 European Championship top scorer: 2013
- Fritz Walter Medal Silver: 2014 Gold: 2015
