= Lena Goeßling =

German footballer (born 1986)

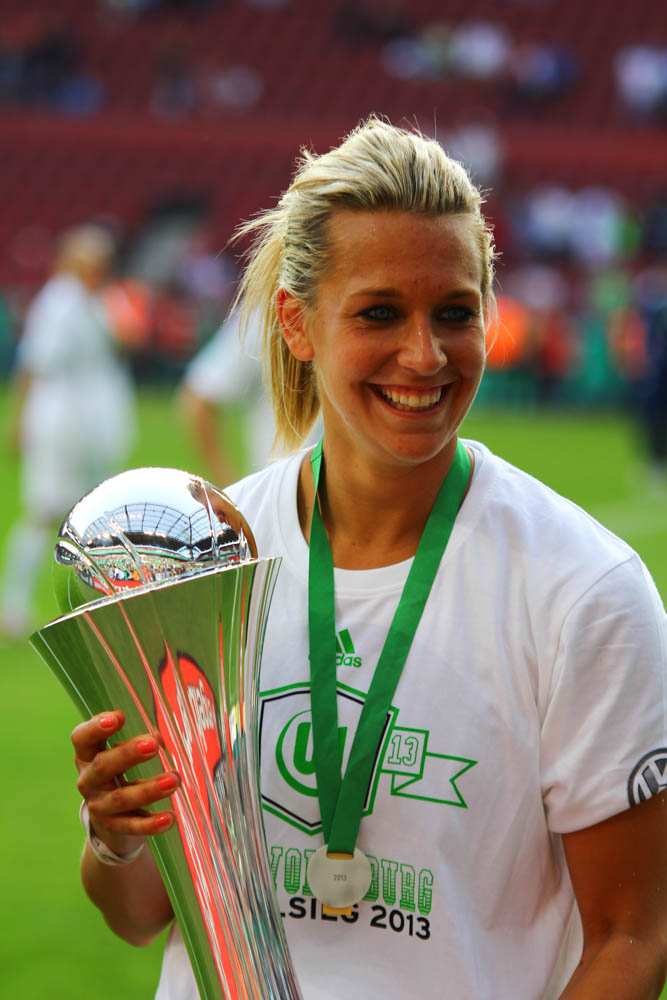
- Goeßling after winning the DFB-Pokal in 2013 with Wolfsburg

Personal information
- Full name: Lena Goeßling
- Date of birth: 8 March 1986 (age 40)
- Place of birth: Bielefeld, West Germany
- Height: 1.71 m (5 ft 7 in)
- Position: Midfielder

Youth career
- SV Löhne-Obernbeck
- SV Sundern
- FC Gütersloh 2000

Senior career*
Years	Team	Apps	(Gls)
2003–2006	FC Gütersloh 2000	35	(7)
2006–2011	SC 07 Bad Neuenahr	98	(19)
2011–2021	VfL Wolfsburg	178	(29)

International career
2002–2003	Germany U17	12	(7)
2003–2005	Germany U19	29	(9)
2006	Germany U20	4	(0)
2007	Germany U23	4	(1)
2008–2019	Germany	106	(10)
Medal record
Women's football
Representing Germany
Olympic Games
Gold medal – first place	2016 Rio de Janeiro	Team
UEFA Women's Championship
Gold medal – first place	2013 Sweden
- * Club domestic league appearances and goals

Lena Goeßling (born 8 March 1986) is a German former footballer. She played as a midfielder.

== Career ==
=== Club ===
Goeßling began her career at her local football club SV Löhne-Obernbeck. She later joined FC Gütersloh 2000, where she won the German Under-17 championship. Goeßling played two seasons in the second Bundesliga with Gütersloh, before joining the top division side SC 07 Bad Neuenahr in 2006. After five years and 97 games for the club, she announced her transfer to VfL Wolfsburg for the 2011–12 season.

After the 2020–21 season, she announced her retirement.

=== International ===
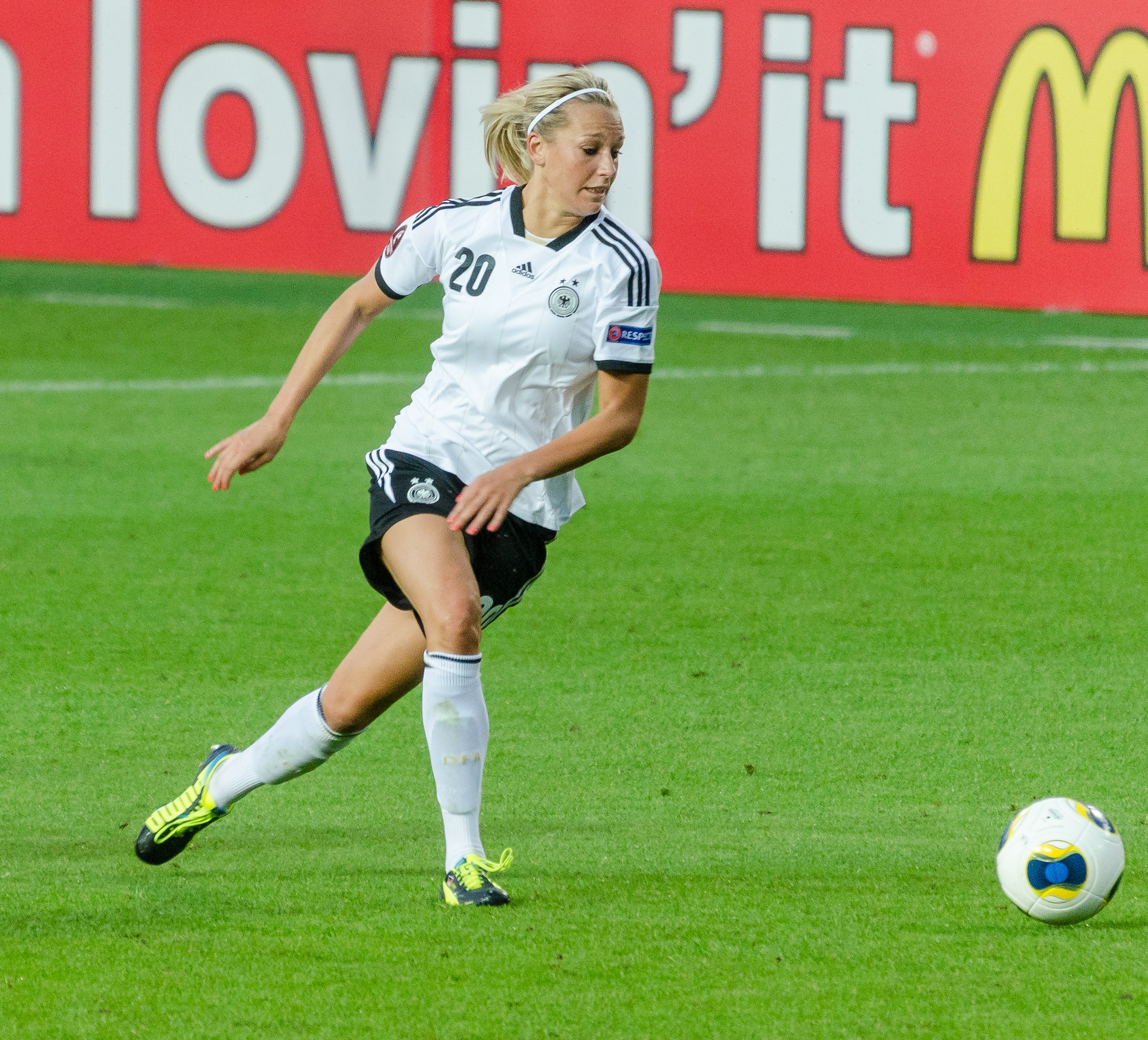
Goeßling playing for Germany at the UEFA Women's Euro 2013.

Goeßling won the 2004 FIFA U-19 Women's World Championship with Germany. She had three appearances for the team and scored twice in the first group game against Thailand. Two years later, she again competed at the 2006 FIFA U-20 Women's World Championship. Now a regular starter, she was eliminated with her team in the quarter-finals against the United States.

In February 2008, Goeßling made her debut for the German national team against China. Twice she has been denied a place in a German squad at international tournaments. She was named to the 26 player preliminary squads at the 2008 Summer Olympics and the 2009 European Championship, but failed to make the final 21 player squad at both tournaments. Goeßling has been called up for the 2011 FIFA Women's World Cup, which was her first major tournament.

She was part of the squad for the 2016 Summer Olympics, where Germany won the gold medal.

She announced her retirement after the 2019 FIFA Women's World Cup.

==== International goals ====
Scores and results list Germany's goal tally first:

Goeßling – goals for Germany
#	Date	Venue	Opponent	Score	Result	Competition
1.	22 October 2011	Bucharest, Romania	Romania	1–0	3–0	UEFA Women's Euro 2013 qualifying
2.	24 November 2011	Motril, Spain	Spain	1–0	2–2	UEFA Women's Euro 2013 qualifying
3.	15 September 2012	Karaganda, Kazakhstan	Kazakhstan	7–0	7–0	UEFA Women's Euro 2013 qualifying
4.	15 June 2013	Essen, Germany	Scotland	1–0	3–0	Friendly
5.	21 September 2013	Cottbus, Germany	Russia	7–0	9–0	2015 FIFA Women's World Cup qualification
6.	26 October 2013	Koper, Slovenia	Slovenia	11–0	13–0	2015 FIFA Women's World Cup qualification
7.	26 October 2013	Koper, Slovenia	Slovenia	12–0	13–0	2015 FIFA Women's World Cup qualification
8.	5 March 2014	Albufeira, Portugal	Iceland	4–0	5–0	2014 Algarve Cup
9.	18 September 2015	Halle, Germany	Hungary	6–0	12–0	UEFA Women's Euro 2017 qualifying
10.	18 September 2015	Halle, Germany	Hungary	7–0	12–0	UEFA Women's Euro 2017 qualifying

== Honours ==
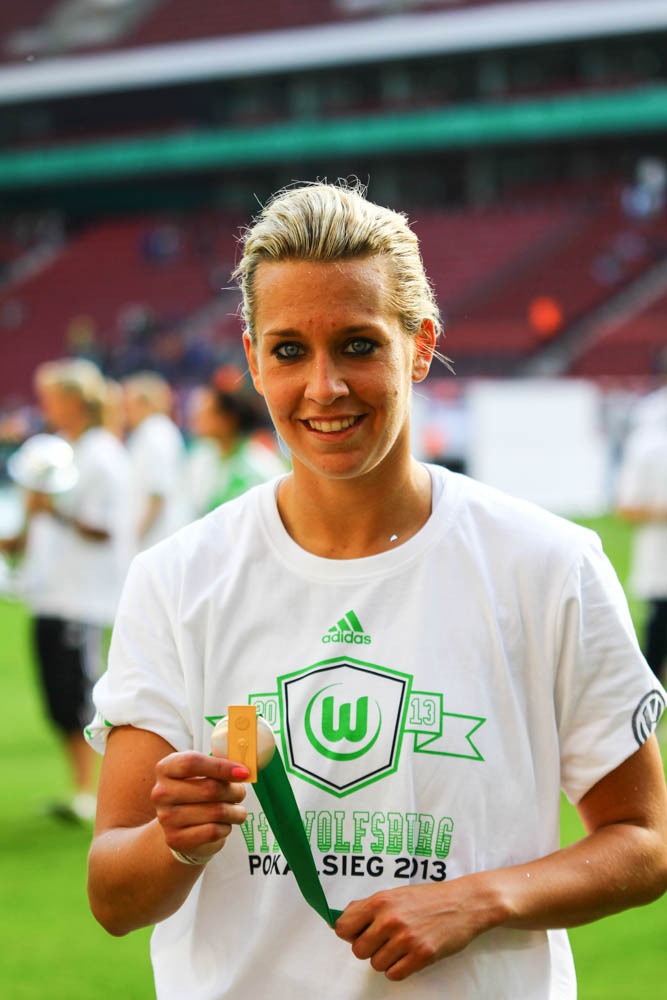
Goeßling with the DFB-Pokal trophy in 2013

=== International ===
- Summer Olympic Games: Gold medal, 2016
- UEFA Women's Championship: Winner 2013
- Algarve Cup: Winner 2012, 2014
- FIFA U-20 Women's World Cup: Winner 2004
- UEFA Women's Under-19 Championship: Runner-up 2004

=== Club ===
VfL Wolfsburg

- UEFA Women's Champions League: Winner 2012–13, 2013–14
- Bundesliga: Winner 2012–13, 2013–14, 2016–17, 2017–18, 2018–19
- DFB Pokal: Winner 2012–13, 2014–15, 2015–16, 2016–17, 2017–18, 2018–19

=== Individual ===
- IFFHS World's Best Woman Playmaker: 2013
- UEFA Women's Championship All-Star Team: 2013
- Silbernes Lorbeerblatt: Winner 2016
- IFFHS Women's World Team: 2020
- IFFHS World's Woman Team of the Decade 2011–2020
- IFFHS UEFA Woman Team of the Decade 2011–2020

== See also ==
- List of women's footballers with 100 or more caps
