= Zsanett Jakabfi =

Hungarian footballer (born 1990)

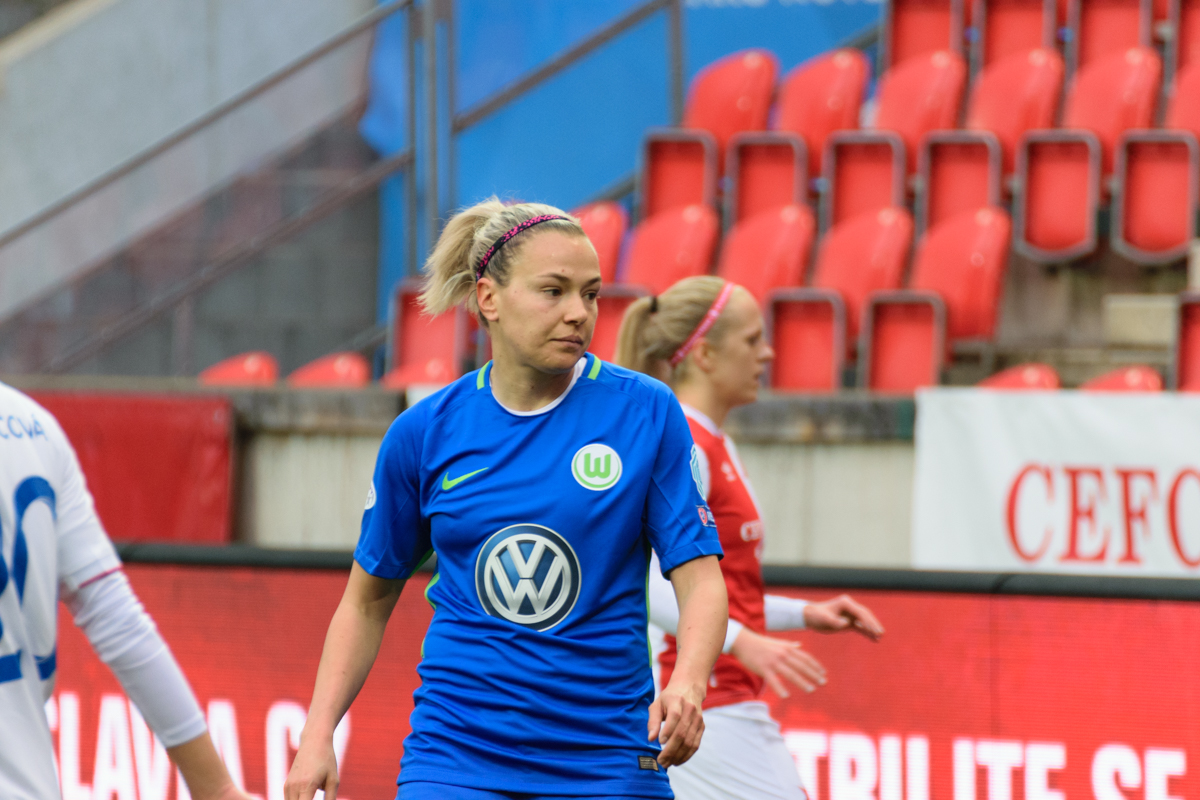
- Jakabfi with Wolfsburg in 2018.

Personal information
- Full name: Zsanett Jakabfi
- Date of birth: 18 February 1990 (age 36)
- Place of birth: Lengyeltóti, Hungary
- Height: 1.72 m (5 ft 8 in)
- Position: Defender

Youth career
- 2004–2007: MTK Hungária

Senior career*
Years	Team	Apps	(Gls)
2007–2009	MTK Hungária		
2009–2021	VfL Wolfsburg	191	(70)
2014–2016	VfL Wolfsburg II	5	(3)

International career
2007–2020	Hungary	62	(3)
- * Club domestic league appearances and goals

Zsanett Jakabfi (born 18 February 1990 in Lengyeltóti) is a former Hungarian footballer, who played for VfL Wolfsburg in Germany's Frauen-Bundesliga.

== Career ==
She previously played for MTK Hungária in Hungary's Női NB I. Jakabfi announced she will retire at the end of the 2020/21 bundesliga season. Jakabfi is a member of the Hungarian national team since 2007.

== International goals ==
No.	Date	Venue	Opponent	Score	Result	Competition
1.	15 March 2007	Ihrisko Integral-DAC, Győr, Hungary	Slovakia	?–?	3–1	Friendly
2.	3 June 2009	Ptuj, Slovenia	Slovenia	?–?	5–2	Friendly
3.	14 November 2009	Stadion Városi, Sopron, Hungary	Ukraine	1–0	1–1	2011 FIFA Women's World Cup qualification
4.	20 May 2010	Stadion Yuri Gagarin, Chernihiv, Ukraine	Ukraine	1–2	2–4	2011 FIFA Women's World Cup qualification
5.	20 May 2010	Stadion Yuri Gagarin, Chernihiv, Ukraine	Ukraine	2–2	2–4	2011 FIFA Women's World Cup qualification
6.	25 August 2010	Stadionul Mogoşoaia, Mogoşoaia, Romania	Romania	1–0	3–2	2011 FIFA Women's World Cup qualification
7.	25 August 2010	Stadionul Mogoşoaia, Mogoşoaia, Romania	Romania	2–0	3–2	2011 FIFA Women's World Cup qualification
8.	25 August 2010	Stadionul Mogoşoaia, Mogoşoaia, Romania	Romania	3–2	3–2	2011 FIFA Women's World Cup qualification
9.	17 September 2011	Lorzestraat, Dessel, Belgium	Belgium	1–1	1–2	UEFA Women's Euro 2013 qualifying
10.	23 November 2013	ETO Park, Győr, Hungary	Kazakhstan	1–1	4–1	2015 FIFA Women's World Cup qualification
11.	11 March 2014	Umag, Croatia	Poland	2–0	4–1	2014 Istria Cup
12.	11 March 2014	Umag, Croatia	Poland	3–?	4–1	2014 Istria Cup
13.	26 November 2014	Telki, Hungary	Macedonia	1–0	8–0	Friendly
14.	25 October 2015	Stadion Gradski vrt, Osijek, Croatia	Croatia	1–0	1–1	UEFA Women's Euro 2017 qualifying
15.	8 April 2016	Ménfői úti Stadion, Győr, Hungary	Croatia	1–0	2–0	UEFA Women's Euro 2017 qualifying
16.	8 April 2016	Ménfői úti Stadion, Győr, Hungary	Croatia	2–0	2–0	UEFA Women's Euro 2017 qualifying
17.	12 April 2016	Minor Sport Arena Petrovsky, Saint Petersburg, Russia	Russia	3–1	3–3	UEFA Women's Euro 2017 qualifying
18.	6 June 2016	Akdeniz University Stadium, Antalya, Turkey	Turkey	1–2	1–2	UEFA Women's Euro 2017 qualifying
19.	19 October 2016	Boryspil, Ukraine	Ukraine	1–0	4–0	Friendly
20.	19 October 2016	Boryspil, Ukraine	Ukraine	3–0	4–0	Friendly
21.	23 November 2016	Telki, Hungary	Serbia	1–?	4–3	Friendly
22.	23 November 2016	Telki, Hungary	Serbia	2–?	4–3	Friendly
23.	19 September 2017	Ménfői úti Stadion, Győr, Hungary	Denmark	1–1	1–6	2019 FIFA Women's World Cup qualification
24.	5 March 2018	Tasos Markos Stadium, Paralimni, Cyprus	Slovakia	1–0	1–1	2018 Cyprus Women's Cup
25.	5 April 2018	Stadion Stanovi, Zadar, Croatia	Croatia	2–0	3–1	2019 FIFA Women's World Cup qualification
26.	12 June 2018	Viborg Stadium, Viborg, Denmark	Denmark	1–0	1–5	2019 FIFA Women's World Cup qualification
27.	5 October 2018	Centenary Stadium, Ta' Qali, Malta	Malta	1–0	1–0	Friendly
28.	4 March 2019	AEK Arena, Larnaca, Cyprus	Mexico	2–2	3–3	2019 Cyprus Women's Cup
29.	4 March 2019	AEK Arena, Larnaca, Cyprus	Mexico	3–2	3–3	2019 Cyprus Women's Cup
30.	6 March 2019	Antonis Papadopoulos Stadium, Larnaca, Cyprus	Slovakia	3–2	3–2	2019 Cyprus Women's Cup
31.	12 November 2019	Rohonci út, Szombathely, Hungary	Latvia	1–0	4–0	UEFA Women's Euro 2022 qualifying

== Titles ==
=== MTK Hungária ===
- Hungarian Women's League: Winner 2005

=== VfL Wolfsburg ===
- Bundesliga: Winner 2012–13, 2013–14, 2016–17, 2017–18, 2018–19, 2019–20
- UEFA Women's Champions League: Winner 2012–13, 2013–14
- DFB-Pokal: Winner 2012–13, 2014–15, 2015–16, 2016–17, 2017–18, 2018–19, 2019–20, 2020–21
