= 2014–15 DFB-Pokal Frauen =

Tournament details
- Country: Germany
- Teams: 56

Final positions
- Champions: VfL Wolfsburg
- Runners-up: 1. FFC Turbine Potsdam

Tournament statistics
- Matches played: 55
- Goals scored: 295 (5.36 per match)
- Top goal scorer(s): Pauline Bremer (8 goals)

The DFB-Pokal 2014–15 was the 35th season of the cup competition, Germany's second-most important title in women's football.

VfL Wolfsburg won their second title after beating 1. FFC Turbine Potsdam 3–0 in the final.

== Results ==
=== First round ===
The draw for the first round was held on 24 July 2014, it was divided into a Northern and Southern draw. The top eight teams from the last Bundesliga season received a bye to the second round. The other four Bundesliga teams all advanced.

23 August
SV Henstedt-Ulzburg	3 – 4	FFV Leipzig
TSV Schott Mainz	7 – 1	VfL Sindelfingen
24 August
FC Viktoria 1889 Berlin	3 – 1 (a.e.t.)	SV Meppen
SV Union Meppen	0 – 5	1. FC Lübars
SG Blau Weiß Beelitz	0 – 8	FSV Gütersloh 2009
GSV 1910 Moers	1 – 2	Magdeburger FFC
Hallescher FC	0 – 5	SV Werder Bremen
1. FFV Erfurt	0 – 2	1. FC Köln
Hegauer FV	3 – 1	TSV Alemannia Aachen
FC Erzgebirge Aue	0 – 6	TSG 1899 Hoffenheim
SV B/W Hohen Neuendorf	0 – 5	MSV Duisburg
SV Germania Hauenhorst	1 – 0	1. FC Union Berlin
ATS Buntentor	0 – 13	VfL Bochum
SV Blau Weiß Berlin	1 – 5	Holstein Kiel
FSV 02 Schwerin	0 – 6	BV Cloppenburg
Hamburger SV	2 – 5	Herforder SV
SG 99 Andernach	3 – 2 (a.e.t.)	SV Weinberg
ASV Hagsfeld	1 – 4	TSV Crailsheim
TSV Jahn Calden	2 – 4	1. FC Saarbrücken
TuS Wörrstadt	0 – 5	ETSV Würzburg
Spvgg Rommelshausen	0 – 3	1. FFC Montabaur
1. FFC Bergisch Gladbach	2 – 1	1. FC Riegelsberg
1. FC Nürnberg	0 – 9	SC Sand
SC 13 Bad Neuenahr	0 – 5	1. FFC 08 Niederkirchen

=== Second round ===
The draw for the second round will be held on 30 August 2014. The eight best placed Bundesliga teams from last season entered this round. The round was drawn in a Northern and Southern group.

Freiburg versus Hoffenheim is the only Bundesliga pairing. The matches will be played on 27th or 28 September.

North

27 September 2014
SV Germania Hauenhorst	0–8	1. FFC Turbine Potsdam
FFV Leipzig	2–3 (a.e.t.)	MSV Duisburg
Holstein Kiel	1–5	VfL Wolfsburg
28 September 2014
FC Viktoria 1889 Berlin	1–5	Herforder SV
FSV Gütersloh 2009	9–1	Magdeburger FFC
SV Werder Bremen	1–5	SGS Essen
BV Cloppenburg	3–1 (a.e.t.)	VfL Bochum
1. FC Lübars	0–1	FF USV Jena

South

28 September 2014
SG 99 Andernach	1–15	1. FFC Frankfurt
Hegauer FV	0–6	Bayer 04 Leverkusen
SV Schott Mainz	1–9	FC Bayern Munich
1. FFC Bergisch Gladbach	1–11	1. FC Köln
TSV Crailsheim	2–0	1. FFC Montabaur
SC Freiburg	2–0	TSG 1899 Hoffenheim
1. FC Saarbrücken	1–3	1. FFC 08 Niederkirchen
SC Sand	6–0	ETSV Würzburg

=== Round of 16 ===
The draw for the round of 16 was held on 20 October 2014.

1 November 2014
1. FFC 08 Niederkirchen	0–6	SC Freiburg
2 November 2014
TSV Crailsheim	0–3	1. FC Köln
SC Sand	2–0	MSV Duisburg
FF USV Jena	0–1	FC Bayern München
SGS Essen	0–1	FSV Gütersloh 2009
1. FFC Turbine Potsdam	4–0	Herforder SV
Bayer 04 Leverkusen	0–3	1. FFC Frankfurt
VfL Wolfsburg	8–0	BV Cloppenburg

=== Quarterfinals ===
Draw was held on 8 November 2014. Gütersloh and Köln are the remaining 2. Bundesliga clubs, the other six play in the top tier. Silke Rottenberg, the former German football goalkeeper, will perform the draw.

20 December 2014
VfL Wolfsburg	2–1 (a.e.t.)	SC Sand
1. FC Köln	0–3	1. FFC Turbine Potsdam
21 December 2014
1. FFC Frankfurt	3–1	FC Bayern München
SC Freiburg	7–3 (a.e.t.)	FSV Gütersloh 2009

=== Semifinals ===
1 April 2015
1. FFC Frankfurt	1–2	1. FFC Turbine Potsdam
SC Freiburg	2–4 (a.e.t.)	VfL Wolfsburg

=== Final ===
1 May 2015
17:15

1. FFC Turbine Potsdam	0–3	VfL Wolfsburg
	Report	Müller 13', 61' (pen.); Popp 70'

RheinEnergieStadion, Cologne
Attendance: 19,204
Referee: Moiken Wolk (Worms)

Potsdam	Wolfsburg

GK	24	(Germany) Anna Felicitas Sarholz
CB	33	(Denmark) Nina Frausing Pedersen	(yellow card) 61'	(substituted off) 65'
CB	4	(Germany) Johanna Elsig
CB	15	(Germany) Inka Wesely
RM	14	(Germany) Jennifer Zietz
CM	21	(Germany) Tabea Kemme
CM	13	(Switzerland) Lia Wälti (c)
LM	11	(Germany) Jennifer Cramer	(yellow card) 89'
RF	6	(Equatorial Guinea) Genoveva Añonma
CF	17	(Japan) Asano Nagasato		(substituted off) 46'
LF	22	(Bosnia and Herzegovina) Lidija Kuliš
Substitutions:
GK	1	(Germany) Vanessa Fischer
GK	28	(China) Wang Fei
DF	19	(Germany) Felicitas Rauch
MF		(Germany) Viktoria Schwalm		(substituted on) 65'
MF	29	(Bosnia and Herzegovina) Amela Kršo
FW	9	(North Macedonia) Nataša Andonova		(substituted on) 46'
FW	25	(Scotland) Lisa Evans
Manager:
Bernd Schröder

GK	1	(Germany) Almuth Schult
RB	9	(Germany) Anna Blässe
CB	4	(Sweden) Nilla Fischer (c)
CB	8	(Germany) Babett Peter
LB	16	(Switzerland) Noelle Maritz
CM	28	(Germany) Lena Goeßling
CM	18	(Switzerland) Vanessa Bernauer		(substituted off) 84'
RW	26	(Norway) Caroline Graham Hansen		(substituted off) 73'
AM	11	(Germany) Alexandra Popp	(yellow card) 34'
LW	22	(Germany) Verena Faißt
CF	25	(Germany) Martina Müller	(yellow card) 90'	(substituted off) 90'
Substitutions:
GK	29	(Germany) Merle Frohms
DF	20	(Germany) Stephanie Bunte
MF	3	(Hungary) Zsanett Jakabfi
MF	10	(Germany) Selina Wagner		(substituted on) 90'
MF	14	(Germany) Lina Magull
MF	31	(Germany) Julia Simic		(substituted on) 84'
FW	19	(Japan) Yūki Ōgimi		(substituted on) 73'
Manager:
Ralf Kellermann

Assistant referees:
Christina Biehl (Siesbach)
Katrin Rafalski (Bad Zwesten)
Fourth official:
Karoline Wacker (Marbach am Neckar)

== Top scorers ==
Final statistics.

Rank	Scorer	Club	Goals
1	(Germany) Pauline Bremer	1. FFC Turbine Potsdam	8
2	(Germany) Anne van Bonn	SC Sand	6
3	(Germany) Nina Ehegötz	FSV Gütersloh 2009	5
3	(Germany) Kerstin Garefrekes	1. FFC Frankfurt	5
3	(Germany) Marie Pollmann	FSV Gütersloh 2009	5
6	(Hungary) Erika Szuh	1. FC Lübars	4
6	(Germany) Shpresa Aradini	FSV Gütersloh 2009	4
6	(Serbia) Jovana Damnjanović	VfL Wolfsburg	4
6	(Germany) Dzsenifer Marozsán	1. FFC Frankfurt	4
6	(Germany) Martina Müller	VfL Wolfsburg	4
6	(Germany) Célia Šašić	1. FFC Frankfurt	4
6	(Australia) Rebekah Stott	SC Sand	4
6	(Czech Republic) Lucie Voňková	MSV Duisburg	4
