= Lina Magull =

German footballer (born 1994)

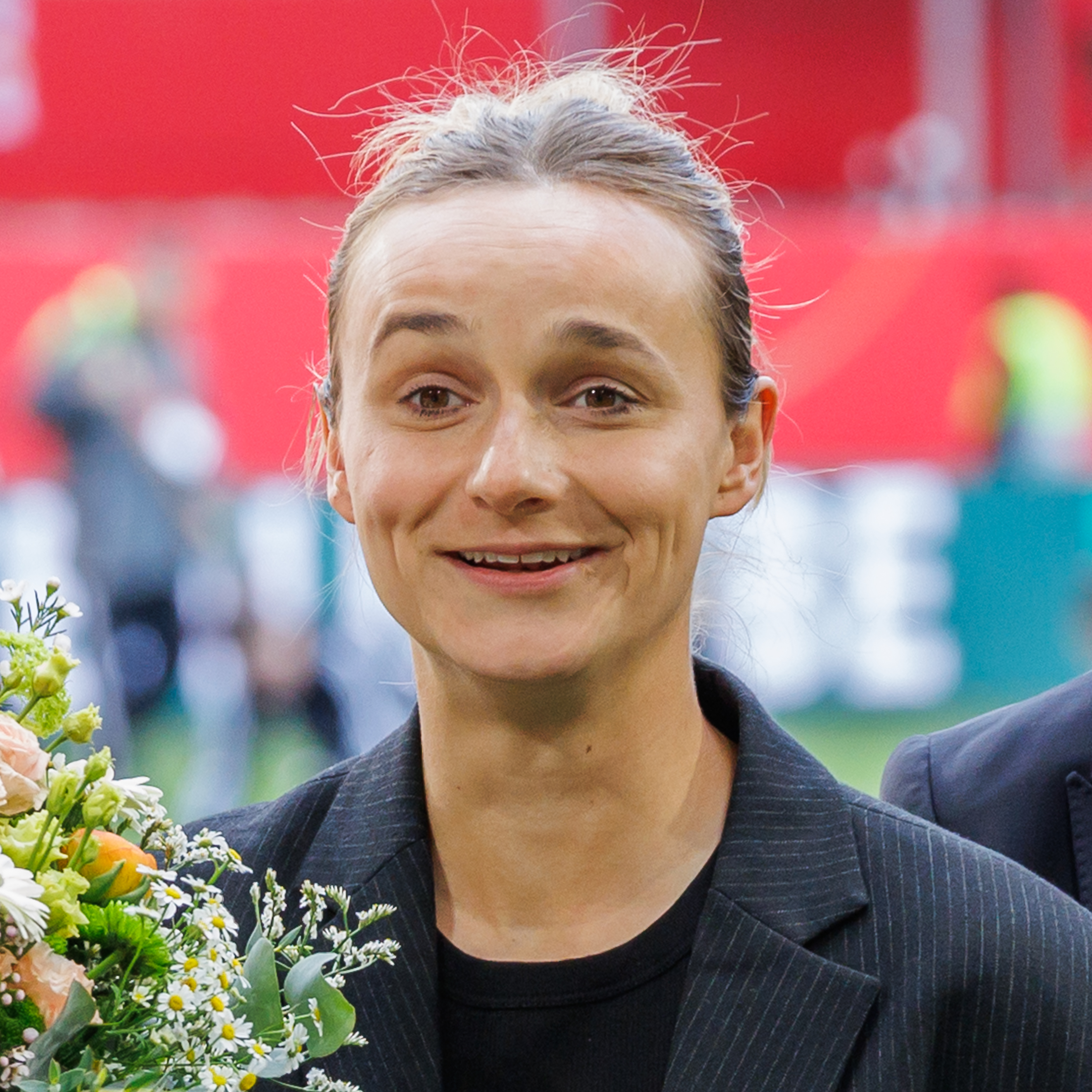
- Magull in 2025

Personal information
- Full name: Lina Marie Magull
- Date of birth: 15 August 1994 (age 32)
- Place of birth: Dortmund, Germany
- Height: 1.66 m (5 ft 5 in)
- Position: Midfielder

Team information
- Current team: Inter Milan
- Number: 10

Youth career
- 1999–2002: Hörder SC
- 2002–2007: Hombrucher SV
- 2008–2009: SuS Kaiserau

Senior career*
Years	Team	Apps	(Gls)
2009–2012	FSV Gütersloh 2009	38	(21)
2012–2015	VfL Wolfsburg	42	(9)
2015–2018	SC Freiburg	64	(29)
2018–2024	Bayern Munich	104	(26)
2024–	Inter Milan	57	(18)

International career
2008–2009	Germany U15	8	(2)
2010–2011	Germany U17	17	(7)
2011–2013	Germany U19	17	(11)
2012–2014	Germany U20	17	(3)
2015–2025	Germany	77	(22)
Medal record
UEFA Women's Championship
Silver medal – second place	2022 England
- * Club domestic league appearances and goals as of 31 October 2026

Lina Marie Magull (born 15 August 1994) is a German professional footballer who plays as a midfielder for Serie A club Inter Milan. She represented the Germany national team until 2024, scoring 22 goals in 77 caps.

== Club career ==
=== Youth career ===
Lina Magull started her youth career playing for Hörder SC from 1999 to 2002. She spent the next six years with Hombrucher SV where she played in an all-boy team. In 2008, she moved in the course of her appointment at the girls' boarding school of the Football and Athletics Association of Westfalia in SuS Kaiserau's youth team C (boys).

=== Senior career ===
One year later she started her senior career with the second division side FSV Gütersloh 2009 and helped them gain the promotion to the Bundesliga. In the 2012–13 season Magull signed a contract with VfL Wolfsburg. She made her Frauen-Bundesliga debut on 23 September 2012 in the devastating 6–0 victory against VfL Sindelfingen. Just four days later, she successfully came on to make her UEFA Women's Champions League debut in VfL Wolfsburg's 5–1 away win against the Polish club Unia Racibórz. On 14 November 2012, Magull scored her first league goal for VfL Wolfsburg against her former club Gütersloh in a game which eventually ended with 10–0 victory to Wolfsburg. She won the treble (Bundesliga, Champions League and DFB-Pokal Frauen) with Wolfsburg in 2012–13 and the continental double in 2013–14. On 12 November 2014, Magull scored two goals against SV Neulengbach to help Wolfsburg past through to the quarter-final of the 2014–15 UEFA Women's Champions League. She won the DFB-Pokal for the second time on 1 May 2015.

On 21 May 2015, she extended her contract with Wolfsburg which will keep her at the German club until 2018. In addition, she was also loaned out to play for the Bundesliga side SC Freiburg so that she will have more chances to develop her career. In May 2016, her loan at SC Freiburg was extended for another year, running until 2017. She impressed over her three years at Freiburg, making 74 appearances in all competitions and scoring 34 goals.

In 2018, she signed for Bayern Munich and quickly became a regular in their starting XI. She scored ten goals in her first season at the club, including two in the Champions League. In December 2019, she extended her contract to stay at Bayern until 2022.

Magull became Bayern Munich captain and, during this time, the team won both the 2020–21 and 2022–23 Frauen-Bundesliga titles. She captained Die Frauen for three years. In November 2023, Lina decided to no longer captain the Bayern team, stating: "The captaincy was a bit of a burden for me. The decision allows me to focus more on myself again." In five and a half seasons with Bayern, Magull scored 40 goals in 159 competitive games.

On 13 January 2024, after requesting to leave Bayern, it was announced that she signed with Serie A side Inter Milan.

On 20 April 2026, she extended her contract with Inter Milan until 30 June 2028.

== International career ==
Lina Magull has been chosen to represent junior teams by the German Football Association since 2008. She took part in the 2010 FIFA U-17 Women's World Cup in Trinidad and Tobago, where Germany lost 1–0 to North Korea in the quarter-final. In 2010 and 2011, she played in the UEFA Women's Under-17 Championship and finished in the third place respectively. She participated in the German squad competing in the 2012 FIFA U-20 Women's World Cup in Japan. In the second group game against Ghana, Magull scored the only winning goal in second half injury time to help Germany secure their place in the quarter-final. Germany eventually reached the final but lost 1–0 to the United States. In 2013, she played in the 2013 UEFA Women's Under-19 Championship in Wales and reached the semi-finals, where her Germany were defeated 2–1 by France. In her second FIFA U-20 Women's World Cup in Canada, Germany, under Magull's captaincy, became the champions after a 1–0 victory after extra time against Nigeria in the final.

On 13 October 2015, Magull (along with Mandy Islacker) was called up to the Germany senior team for the first time in preparation for the two UEFA Women's Euro 2017 qualifiers against Russia and Turkey. She made her debut in the qualifying game versus Russia on 22 October.

Magull was part of the Germany squad that went to the 2016 Olympic Games in Rio de Janeiro. She was one of the team's alternates, and the Germans won the gold medal, beating Sweden 2–1 in the final. The midfielder was named in Germany's squad for UEFA Women's Euro 2017. At the 2019 FIFA Women's World Cup, she scored a goal in Germany's 4–0 win over South Africa. She scored Germany's lone goal in their 2–1 quarterfinal defeat against Sweden.

Magull produced top performances at UEFA Women's Euro 2022, where Germany reached the final but were narrowly beaten 2-1 after extra time by hosts England at Wembley Stadium. She starred with three goals and one assist in five games at the tournament, and scored Germany's only goal of the final in the 79th-minute to make it 1–1 and force the match into extra time.

Magull was also a part of the squad that represented Germany at the 2023 FIFA Women's World Cup in Australia and New Zealand. She announced her retirement from international football in March 2025, having scored 22 goals and made 77 appearances for the Germany women's national team.

== Career statistics ==
=== Club ===
As of match played 1 October 2026

Appearances and goals by club, season and competition
Club	Season	League			National cup (Note: Includes the DFB Pokal, Coppa Italia Femminile)		League cup (Note: Includes the Serie A Women's Cup)		Continental (Note: Includes UEFA Women's Champions League)		Total	
Club	Season	Division	Apps	Goals	Apps	Goals	Apps	Goals	Apps	Goals	Apps	Goals
FSV Gütersloh 2009	2009–10	2. Frauen-Bundesliga	3	0	0	0	–		–		3	0
FSV Gütersloh 2009	2010–11	2. Frauen-Bundesliga	14	2	2	0	–		–		16	2
FSV Gütersloh 2009	2011–12	2. Frauen-Bundesliga	21	19	3	1	–		–		24	20
FSV Gütersloh 2009	Total		38	21	5	1	–		–		43	22
VfL Wolfsburg	2012–13	Frauen-Bundesliga	15	2	5	2	–		8	0	28	4
VfL Wolfsburg	2013–14	Frauen-Bundesliga	11	2	2	1	–		4	4	17	7
VfL Wolfsburg	2014–15	Frauen-Bundesliga	16	5	4	0	–		6	2	26	7
VfL Wolfsburg	Total		42	9	11	3	–		18	6	71	18
SC Freiburg (loan)	2015–16	Frauen-Bundesliga	20	6	3	2	–		–		23	8
SC Freiburg	2016–17	Frauen-Bundesliga	22	11	4	2	–		–		26	13
SC Freiburg	2017–18	Frauen-Bundesliga	22	12	3	1	–		–		25	13
SC Freiburg	Total		64	29	10	5	–		–		74	34
Bayern Munich	2018–19	Frauen-Bundesliga	17	7	4	1	–		8	2	29	10
Bayern Munich	2019–20	Frauen-Bundesliga	20	5	1	0	–		4	2	25	7
Bayern Munich	2020–21	Frauen-Bundesliga	20	5	4	1	–		7	1	31	7
Bayern Munich	2021–22	Frauen-Bundesliga	20	4	3	1	–		7	0	30	5
Bayern Munich	2022–23	Frauen-Bundesliga	19	5	4	2	–		8	1	31	8
Bayern Munich	2023–24	Frauen-Bundesliga	8	0	1	0	–		4	0	13	0
Bayern Munich	Total		104	26	17	5	–		38	6	159	37
Inter Milan	2023–24	Serie A Women	14	9	2	0	–		–		16	9
Inter Milan	2024–25	Serie A Women	24	6	2	1	–		–		26	7
Inter Milan	2025–26	Serie A Women	18	2	3	1	2	0	6	1 (Note: Two appearances and one goal in UEFA Women's Champions League qualifying rounds and Four appearances in UEFA Women's Europa Cup)	29	4
Inter Milan	2026–27	Serie A Women	1	1	0	0	1	0	3	0	5	1
Inter Milan	Total		57	18	7	2	3	0	9	1	76	21
Career total			305	103	50	16	3	0	65	13	423	132

=== International ===
Appearances and goals by national team and year
National team	Year	Apps	Goals
Germany	2015	3	2
Germany	2016	5	0
Germany	2017	9	1
Germany	2018	10	4
Germany	2019	14	6
Germany	2020	5	1
Germany	2021	8	3
Germany	2022	13	4
Germany	2023	7	0
Germany	2024	2	0
Total		77	22

Scores and results list Germany's goal tally first, score column indicates score after each Magull goal.

List of international goals scored by Lina Magull
No.	Date	Venue	Opponent	Score	Result	Competition
1	25 October 2015	Sandhausen, Germany	Turkey	5–0	7–0	UEFA Women's Euro 2017 qualifying
2	25 October 2015	Sandhausen, Germany	Turkey	6–0	7–0	UEFA Women's Euro 2017 qualifying
3	24 October 2017	Großaspach, Germany	Faroe Islands	7–0	11–0	2019 FIFA Women's World Cup qualifying
4	10 April 2018	Domžale, Slovenia	Slovenia	1–0	4–0	2019 FIFA Women's World Cup qualifying
5	4 September 2018	Tórshavn, Faroe Islands	Faroe Islands	2–0	8–0	2019 FIFA Women's World Cup qualifying
6	4 September 2018	Tórshavn, Faroe Islands	Faroe Islands	5–0	8–0	2019 FIFA Women's World Cup qualifying
7	10 November 2018	Osnabrück, Germany	Italy	1–0	5–2	Friendly
8	17 June 2019	Montpellier, France	South Africa	4–0	4–0	2019 FIFA Women's World Cup
9	29 June 2019	Rennes, France	Sweden	1–0	1–2	2019 FIFA Women's World Cup
10	3 September 2019	Lviv, Ukraine	Ukraine	2–0	8–0	UEFA Women's Euro 2021 qualifying
11	5 October 2019	Aachen, Germany	Ukraine	8–0	3–0	UEFA Women's Euro 2021 qualifying
12	5 October 2019	Aachen, Germany	Ukraine	8–0	4–0	UEFA Women's Euro 2021 qualifying
13	5 October 2019	Aachen, Germany	Ukraine	8–0	8–0	UEFA Women's Euro 2021 qualifying
14	1 December 2020	Tallaght, Ireland	Republic of Ireland	1–0	3–0	UEFA Women's Euro 2021 qualifying
15	18 September 2021	Cottbus, Germany	Bulgaria	2–0	7–0	2023 FIFA Women's World Cup qualification
16	18 September 2021	Cottbus, Germany	Bulgaria	3–0	7–0	2023 FIFA Women's World Cup qualification
17	26 October 2021	Essen, Germany	Israel	5–0	7–0	2023 FIFA Women's World Cup qualification
18	23 February 2022	Wolverhampton, England	England	1–1	1–3	2022 Arnold Clark Cup
19	24 June 2022	Erfurt, Germany	Switzerland	2–0	7–0	Friendly
20	8 July 2022	London, England	Denmark	1–0	4–0	UEFA Women's Euro 2022
21	22 July 2022	London, England	Austria	1–0	2–0	UEFA Women's Euro 2022
22	31 July 2022	London, England	England	1–1	1–2	UEFA Women's Euro 2022

== Honours ==
VfL Wolfsburg

- UEFA Women's Champions League: 2012–13, 2013–14
- Bundesliga: 2012–13, 2013–14
- DFB-Pokal: 2012–13, 2014–15

Bayern Munich

- Bundesliga: 2020–21, 2022–23

Inter Milan

- Serie A runner-up: 2025–26

Germany

- Summer Olympics Gold Medal: 2016
- UEFA Women's Championship runner-up: 2022

Germany U20

- FIFA U-20 Women's World Cup: 2014; runner-up 2012

Individual

- Fritz Walter Medal: Silver 2012
- Serie A Team of the Season: 2024–25
