= 2012–13 DFB-Pokal Frauen =

Tournament details
- Country: Germany

Final positions
- Champions: VfL Wolfsburg
- Runners-up: Turbine Potsdam

Tournament statistics
- Matches played: 55
- Goals scored: 292 (5.31 per match)
- Top goal scorer: Conny Pohlers (8 goals)

The DFB-Pokal 2012–13 was the 33rd season of the cup competition, Germany's second-most important title in women's football.

== Participating clubs ==
The following teams qualified for the DFB-Pokal:

| BUNDESLIGA all clubs of 2011–12 | 2. BUNDESLIGA; 18 of 24 clubs of 2011–12 (Note: Being second teams FCR 2001 Duisburg II, FFC Frankfurt II, Jena II, Bayern Munich II, Bad Neuenahr II, and Turbine Potsdam II may not compete in the cup.) | REGIONALLIGA; 5 clubs promoted in 2011–12 | REGIONAL CUPS; Winners of 2011–12 |
| SC 07 Bad Neuenahr FCR 2001 Duisburg SGS Essen: 1. FFC Frankfurt; SC Freiburg Hamburger SV FF USV Jena: 1. FC Lokomotive Leipzig; Bayer Leverkusen FC Bayern Munich: 1. FFC Turbine Potsdam; VfL Wolfsburg | Werder Bremen BV Cloppenburg TSV Crailsheim FSV Gütersloh 2009 Herforder SV 1899 Hoffenheim: 1. FC Köln; FV Löchgau: 1. FC Lübars; Magdeburger FFC Mellendorfer TV SV Meppen Borussia Mönchengladbach: 1. FFC 08 Niederkirchen; FFC Oldesloe 2000: 1. FC Saarbrücken; VfL Sindelfingen ETSV Würzburg | SV Bardenbach Blau-Weiß Hohen Neuendorf Holstein Kiel: 1. FFC Recklinghausen; SC Sand | Baden: ASV Hagsfeld; Bavaria: SV 67 Weinberg; Berlin: BSV Al-Dersimspor (Note: Blau-Weiß Hohen Neuendorf won the cup, but is qualified as a team that achieved promotion to the 2. Bundesliga.); Brandenburg: FC Borussia Brandenburg; Bremen: ATS Buntentor; Hamburg: FC Bergedorf 85; Hesse: RSV Roßdorf; Mecklenburg-Vorpommern: 1. FC Neubrandenburg 04; Middle Rhine: SF Uevekoven; Lower Rhine: Borussia Bocholt; Lower Saxony: Fortuna Celle (Note: champion VfL Wolfsburg II is not eligible.); Rhineland: TuS Ahrbach; Saarland: SSV Saarlouis; Saxony: SG LVB Leipzig (Note: 1. FC Lokomotive Leipzig II won the cup but is ineligible to enter DFB Cup); Saxony-Anhalt: Hallescher FC; Schleswig-Holstein: SSC Hagen Ahrensburg; South Baden: Police SV Freiburg (Note: SC Sand won the cup, but is qualified as a team that achieved promotion to the 2. Bundesliga.); South West: TSV Schott Mainz; Thuringia: 1. FFV Erfurt; Westphalia: Sportfreunde Siegen; Württemberg: TV Derendingen |

== Results ==
=== Round 1 ===
The draw for the first round was held on 13 July 2012. The eight best clubs of the previous Bundesliga season were awarded byes for the first round.

25 August 2012
| ATS Buntentor | 0–13 | FF USV Jena |
| 1. FC Neubrandenburg 04 | 0–5 | FFC Oldesloe 2000 |
| BSV Al-Dersimspor | 0–7 | 1. FC Lübars |
| Sportfreunde Siegen | 0–2 | 1899 Hoffenheim |
| Borussia Brandenburg | 0–7 | Blau-Weiß Hohen Neuendorf |
| Mellendorfer TV | 0–18 | Magdeburger FFC |
| TuS Ahrbach | 0–9 | 1. FC Saarbrücken |
| Hallescher FC | 1–4 | Herforder SV |
| TV Derendingen | 1–2 | TSV Crailsheim |
| Fortuna Celle | 0–8 | FSV Gütersloh 2009 |
26 August 2012
| SF Uevekoven | 1–3 | VfL Sindelfingen |
| FC Bergedorf 85 | 1–3 | SV Meppen |
| 1. FFV Erfurt | 0–6 | 1. FC Lokomotive Leipzig |
| Borussia Bocholt | 1–2 | 1. FFC Recklinghausen |
| FV Löchgau | 0–3 | ETSV Würzburg |
| ASV Hagsfeld | 1–5 | 1. FC Köln |
| SV 67 Weinberg | 2–0 | 1. FFC 08 Niederkirchen |
| RSV Roßdorf | 2–1 | DJK Saarwellingen |
| SG LVB Leipzig | 0–9 | Werder Bremen |
| Borussia Mönchengladbach | 2–1 | SV RW Bardenbach |
| TSV Schott Mainz | 2–7 | Bayer Leverkusen |
| Hamburger SV | 0–6 | BV Cloppenburg |
| PSV Freiburg | 1–3 a.e.t. | SC Sand |
| Hagen Ahrensburg | 1–5 | Holstein Kiel |

=== Round 2 ===
The draw for the second round was held on 11 September 2012. The match between Bayern Munich and Frankfurt is a repeat of the 2011−12 championship game.

6 October 2012
| Magdeburger FFC | 0–3 | Werder Bremen |
| RSV Roßdorf | 2–3 a.e.t. | TSV Crailsheim |
| 1. FC Saarbrücken | 0–6 | SC Bad Neuenahr |
| SV 67 Weinberg | 1–5 | SC Freiburg |
| BV Cloppenburg | 6–1 | 1. FFC Recklinghausen |
7 October 2012
| FFC Oldesloe 2000 | 0–5 | 1. FC Lokomotive Leipzig |
| Borussia Mönchengladbach | 0–3 | SC Sand |
| 1. FFC Turbine Potsdam | 5–3 | SGS Essen |
| Herforder SV | 3–1 | FSV Gütersloh 2009 |
| VfL Wolfsburg | 4–0 | 1. FC Lübars |
| Bayer Leverkusen | 5–0 a.e.t. | FCR 2001 Duisburg |
| Bayern Munich | 1–1 (6–4 pen) | 1. FFC Frankfurt |
| 1. FC Köln | 3–2 | ETSV Würzburg |
| Blau-Weiss Hohen Neuendorf | 0–2 | FF USV Jena |
| Holstein Kiel | 1–3 a.e.t. | SV Meppen |
| 1899 Hoffenheim | 6–4 a.e.t. | VfL Sindelfingen |

=== Round of 16 ===
The draw for the round of 16 was held on 14 October 2012. The matches will be played on 17 and 18 November 2012.

17 November 2012
| 1. FC Köln | 0–1 | SC Freiburg |
| 1899 Hoffenheim | 3–1 | 1. FC Lokomotive Leipzig |
| SC Bad Neuenahr | 0–1 | 1. FFC Turbine Potsdam |
18 November 2012
| TSV Crailsheim | 1–5 | Herforder SV |
| Werder Bremen | 1–4 | FF USV Jena |
| BV Cloppenburg | 2–3 a.e.t. | SC Sand |
| SV Meppen | 0–4 | Bayern Munich |
| FCR 2001 Duisburg | 1–8 | VfL Wolfsburg |

=== Quarterfinals ===
The draw for the quarterfinals was held on 29 November 2012. The matches were played on 15 and 16 December 2012. One match was delayed due to bad weather.

15 December 2012
| 1899 Hoffenheim | 1–5 | Bayern Munich |
16 December 2012
| SC Sand | 0–1 | 1. FFC Turbine Potsdam |
| SC Freiburg | 6–2 | Herforder SV |
9 February 2013
| VfL Wolfsburg | 3–0 | FF USV Jena |

=== Semifinals ===
The draw for the semifinals was held on 19 December 2012.

2 March 2013
14:00

| Freiburg | 0 – 5 | Wolfsburg |
|---|---|---|
| | | Popp 20'; Wensing 52'; Müller 58', 66'; Pohlers 72' |

Möslerstadion, Freiburg
Attendance: 1,003
Referee: Angelika Söder
3 March 2013
13:00

| Turbine Potsdam | 4 – 1 (a.e.t.) | Bayern Munich |
|---|---|---|
| Evans 51', 118'; Ōgimi 101' (pen.); Bremer 120' | | Hagen 81' |

Karl-Liebknecht-Stadion, Potsdam
Attendance: 2,260
Referee: Marina Wozniak

=== Final ===
The final was played on 19 May 2013.

19 May 2013
16:30

| VfL Wolfsburg | 3 – 2 | Turbine Potsdam |
|---|---|---|
| Müller 45', 52'; Pohlers 55' | Report | Evans 59'; Ōgimi 62' (pen.) |

RheinEnergieStadion, Cologne
Attendance: 14,269
Referee: Katrin Rafalski

| Wolfsburg | Potsdam |

WOLFSBURG:
| GK | 12 | (Germany) Jana Burmeister |
| RB | 2 | (Germany) Luisa Wensing |
| CB | 27 | (Germany) Josephine Henning | (yellow card) 62' |
| CB | 28 | (Germany) Lena Goeßling |
| LB | 6 | (Germany) Maren Tetzlaff |
| RM | 9 | (Germany) Anna Blässe |
| CM | 7 | (Germany) Viola Odebrecht |
| CM | 13 | (Germany) Nadine Keßler (c) |
| LM | 25 | (Germany) Martina Müller |
| CF | 14 | (Germany) Lina Magull | | (substituted off) 69' |
| CF | 26 | (Germany) Conny Pohlers | | (substituted off) 90+1' |
Substitutions:
| MF | 3 | (Hungary) Zsanett Jakabfi | | (substituted in) 69' |
| MF | 18 | (Germany) Ivonne Hartmann | | (substituted in) 90+1' |
Manager:
Ralf Kellermann

POTSDAM:
| GK | 1 | (United States) Alyssa Naeher |
| RB | 31 | (Germany) Pauline Bremer (c) |
| CB | 18 | (United States) Alex Singer |
| CB | 22 | (Germany) Stefanie Draws |
| LB | 21 | (Germany) Tabea Kemme |
| RM | 5 | (Norway) Maren Mjelde |
| CM | 10 | (Germany) Patricia Hanebeck |
| LM | 11 | (Germany) Jennifer Cramer | (substituted off) 77' |
| RW | 16 | (North Macedonia) Nataša Andonova | (substituted off) 39' |
| CF | 17 | (Japan) Yūki Ōgimi |
| LW | 30 | (Equatorial Guinea) Genoveva Añonma | (substituted off) 46' |
Substitutions:
| FW | 25 | (Scotland) Lisa Evans | (substituted in) 39' |
| MF | 19 | (Sweden) Antonia Göransson | (substituted in) 46' |
| FW | 9 | (Norway) Ada Hegerberg | (substituted in) 77' |
Manager:
Bernd Schröder

== Top goalscorers ==
| Scorer | Club | Goals |
|---|---|---|
| (Germany) Conny Pohlers | VfL Wolfsburg | 8 |
| (Germany) Dania Schuster | Magdeburger FFC | 7 |
| (Germany) Sarah Schatton | 1. FC Saarbrücken | 6 |
| (Germany) Martina Müller | VfL Wolfsburg | 6 |
| (Poland) Agnieszka Winczo | BV Cloppenburg | 6 |
| (United States) Sarah Hagen | FC Bayern Munich | 6 |
| (Germany) Anna Laue | Herforder SV | 5 |
