= Ivonne Hartmann =

German footballer (born 1981)

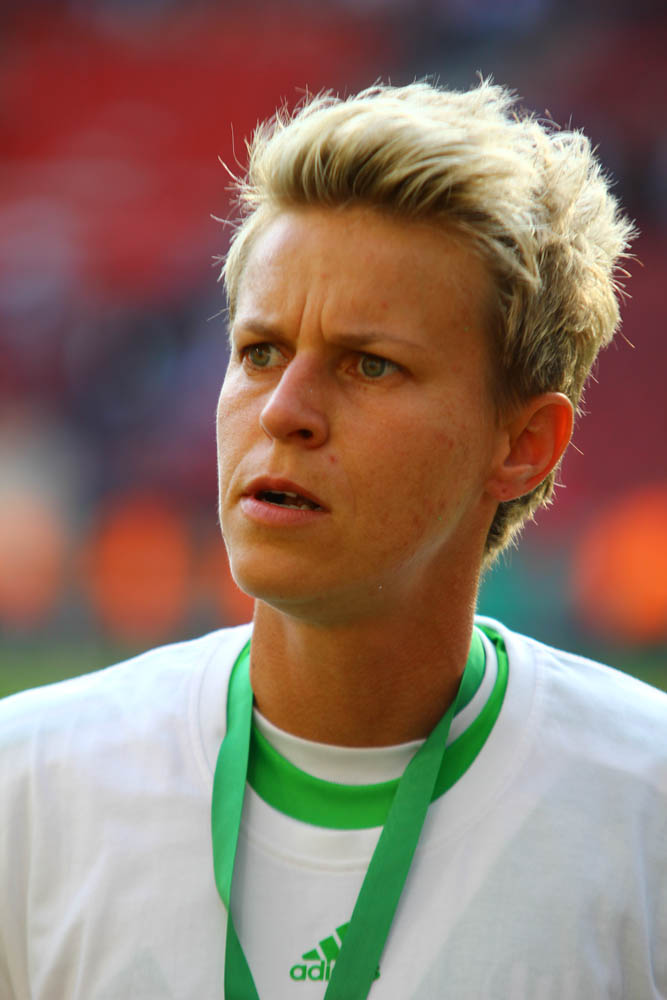
- Hartmann in 2013

Personal information
- Date of birth: 15 September 1981 (age 45)
- Place of birth: Meiningen, Germany
- Height: 1.72 m (5 ft 8 in)
- Position: Midfielder

Youth career
- –1997: SG Helba (Meiningen)
- 1997–2000: USV Jena

Senior career*
Years	Team	Apps	(Gls)
2000–2001	1. FFC Frankfurt	6	(0)
2001–2010	FF USV Jena	114	(80)
2010–2014	VfL Wolfsburg	64	(4)
2014–2015	FF USV Jena	22	(4)
- * Club domestic league appearances and goals

Ivonne Hartmann (born 15 September 1981) is a German former professional footballer who played as a midfielder.

== Honours ==
VfL Wolfsburg

- Bundesliga: 2000–01, 2013–14
- UEFA Women's Champions League: 2012–13, 2013–14
- DFB-Pokal: 2000–01, 2012–13
