= Martina Müller (footballer) =

German footballer (born 1980)

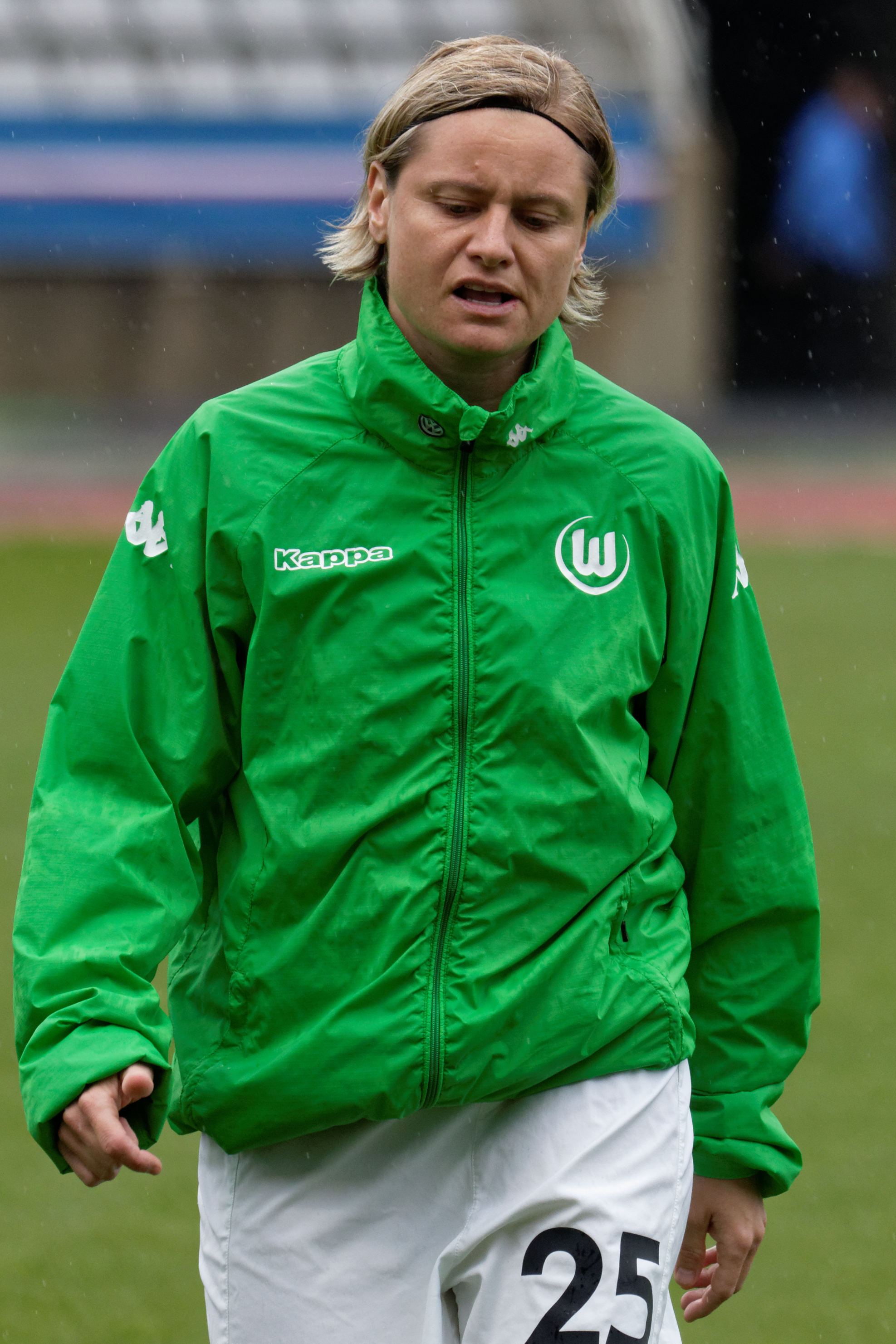
- Müller with Wolfsburg in 2015

Personal information
- Full name: Martina Müller
- Date of birth: 18 April 1980 (age 46)
- Place of birth: Kassel, West Germany
- Height: 1.61 m (5 ft 3 in)
- Position: Striker

Youth career
- SG Helsa
- FSC Lohfelden
- SG Kaufungen
- TSV Jahn Calden

Senior career*
Years	Team	Apps	(Gls)
1998–2000	FSV Frankfurt	22	(15)
2000–2005	SC 07 Bad Neuenahr	79	(65)
2005–2015	VfL Wolfsburg	210	(138)

International career^{‡}
2000–2012	Germany	101	(37)
Medal record
Women's football
Representing Germany
FIFA Women's World Cup
Gold medal – first place	2003 United States	Team
Gold medal – first place	2007 China	Team
Olympic Games
Bronze medal – third place	2004 Athens	Team
UEFA Women's Championship
Gold medal – first place	2001 Germany	Team
Gold medal – first place	2009 Finland	Team
- * Club domestic league appearances and goals as of 18:05, 25 October 2015 (UTC) ‡ National team caps and goals as of 20:12, 3 December 2012 (UTC)

Martina Müller (born 18 April 1980) is a retired German footballer. She played as a striker for VfL Wolfsburg and the German national team.

== Club career ==
Müller had played at several smaller clubs at youth level, before joining the reigning German champions FSV Frankfurt in 1998. Because many of club's star players, such as Birgit Prinz and Sandra Smisek, had left that summer, Müller immediately became a regular starter and helped the team avoid relegation. After two years, she moved to SC 07 Bad Neuenahr, where she played for four seasons. In 2005, she joined VfL Wolfsburg, at a time when the club had just been relegated to the second division. With 36 goals, Müller was the second Bundesliga top-scorer the following season, helping Wolfsburg to achieve immediate promotion back to the German top flight.

Müller remained with Wolfsburg in their 2012–13 breakout season, when they won a treble of Bundesliga, DFB-Pokal and UEFA Women's Champions League. In May 2013's Champions League final at Stamford Bridge Müller scored the decisive penalty kick to defeat Olympique Lyonnais 1–0. The result halted Lyon's 118–match unbeaten run and stopped the French team winning a third successive continental title.

On 13 April 2015 she announced that she would retire at the end of the 2014–15 season.

== International career ==
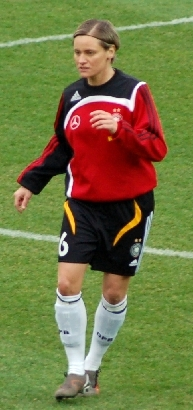
Müller with Germany in 2008

Müller made her debut for the German national team against the United States in July 2000. In the following years, she won several major titles with Germany, almost exclusively as a reserve player, often coming on as a late substitute. Müller won her first international trophy at the 2001 European Championship. Two years later, she was part of Germany's winning team at the 2003 FIFA Women's World Cup. She had three appearances and scored twice in the tournament.

At the 2004 Summer Olympics, Müller claimed the bronze medal. She again became world champion at the 2007 FIFA Women's World Cup, where she played in four matches, coming from the bench in all of them. She scored Germany's third goal in the semi-final against Norway. Müller won the European Championship a second time with Germany in 2009, and was called up for the 2011 FIFA Women's World Cup squad.

== Career statistics ==
=== International goals ===
Scores and results list Germany's goal tally first:

Müller – goals for Germany
#	Date	Location	Opponent	Score	Result	Competition
1.	10 May 2001	Troisdorf, Germany	Italy	1–0	1–0	Friendly
2.	17 June 2001	Oberhausen, Germany	Canada	7–1	7–1	Friendly
3.	9 September 2001	Chicago, United States	United States	1–1	1–4	2001 Women's U.S. Cup
4.	27 September 2001	Kassel, Germany	England	1–0	3–1	2003 FIFA Women's World Cup qualification
5.	25 October 2001	Wolfsburg, Germany	Portugal	3–0	9–0	2003 FIFA Women's World Cup qualification
6.	25 October 2001	Wolfsburg, Germany	Portugal	5–0	9–0	2003 FIFA Women's World Cup qualification
7.	25 October 2001	Wolfsburg, Germany	Portugal	9–0	9–0	2003 FIFA Women's World Cup qualification
8.	1 March 2002	Portimão, Portugal	Denmark	3–0	3–0	2002 Algarve Cup
9.	14 September 2002	Grimstad, Norway	Norway	1–0	3–1	Friendly
10.	26 January 2003	Wuhan, China	Norway	1–1	2–2	2003 Four Nations Tournament
11.	4 March 2003	Gütersloh, Germany	China	1–0	2–2	Friendly
12.	4 March 2003	Gütersloh, Germany	China	2–2	2–2	Friendly
13.	6 March 2003	Arnsberg, Germany	China	1–0	3–1	Friendly
14.	6 August 2003	Trier, Germany	Nigeria	2–0	3–0	Friendly
15.	6 August 2003	Trier, Germany	Nigeria	3–0	3–0	Friendly
16.	9 August 2003	Kyiv, Ukraine	Ukraine	3–1	3–1	UEFA Women's Euro 2005 qualification
17.	28 August 2003	Passau, Germany	Czech Republic	4–0	4–0	UEFA Women's Euro 2005 qualification
18.	27 September 2003	Washington, D.C., United States	Argentina	6–1	6–1	2003 FIFA Women's World Cup
19.	3 October 2003	Portland, United States	Russia	1–0	7–1	2003 FIFA Women's World Cup
20.	2 May 2004	Livingston, Scotland	Scotland	3–1	3–1	UEFA Women's Euro 2005 qualification
21.	11 August 2004	Patras, Greece	China	8–0	8–0	2004 Summer Olympics
22.	3 August 2006	Krefeld, Germany	Italy	5–0	5–0	Friendly
23.	30 August 2006	Schaffhausen, Switzerland	Switzerland	5–0	6–0	2007 FIFA Women's World Cup qualification
24.	25 October 2006	Aalen, Germany	England	4–1	5–1	Friendly
25.	10 May 2007	Haverfordwest, Wales	Wales	5–0	6–0	2007 FIFA Women's World Cup qualification
26.	2 August 2007	Gera, Germany	Czech Republic	4–0	5–0	Friendly
27.	26 September 2007	Tianjin, China	Norway	3–0	3–0	2007 FIFA Women's World Cup
28.	6 August 2009	Bochum, Germany	Russia	3–1	3–1	Friendly
29.	26 February 2010	Parchal, Portugal	Finland	7–0	7–0	2010 Algarve Cup
30.	28 October 2010	Wolfsburg, Germany	Australia	2–1	2–1	Friendly
31.	17 September 2011	Augsburg, Germany	Switzerland	4–1	4–1	UEFA Women's Euro 2013 qualifying
32.	19 November 2011	Wiesbaden, Germany	Kazakhstan	15–0	17–0	UEFA Women's Euro 2013 qualifying
33.	19 November 2011	Wiesbaden, Germany	Kazakhstan	16–0	17–0	UEFA Women's Euro 2013 qualifying
34.	15 September 2012	Karaganda, Kazakhstan	Kazakhstan	6–0	7–0	UEFA Women's Euro 2013 qualifying
35.	19 September 2012	Duisburg, Germany	Turkey	6–0	10–0	UEFA Women's Euro 2013 qualifying
36.	19 September 2012	Duisburg, Germany	Turkey	9–0	10–0	UEFA Women's Euro 2013 qualifying
37.	19 September 2012	Duisburg, Germany	Turkey	10–0	10–0	UEFA Women's Euro 2013 qualifying

== Honours ==
VfL Wolfsburg

- Bundesliga: Winner (2) 2012-13, 2013-14
- DFB-Pokal: Winner (2) 2012-13, 2014-15
- UEFA Women's Champions League: Winner (2) 2012–13, 2013–14

Germany

- FIFA World Cup: Winner (2) 2003, 2007
- UEFA European Championship: Winner (2) 2001, 2009
- Olympic bronze medal: (1) 2004

Individual

- Silbernes Lorbeerblatt: 2003, 2007
- German Women's Footballer of the Year: 2013
