= 2012–13 Frauen-Bundesliga =

Frauen-Bundesliga
- Season: 2012–13
- Champions: VfL Wolfsburg
- Relegated: SC 07 Bad Neuenahr; FSV Gütersloh 2009
- UEFA Women's Champions League: VfL Wolfsburg; 1. FFC Turbine Potsdam
- Matches: 132
- Goals: 451 (3.42 per match)
- Top goalscorer: Callum Black (Liverpool, UK) ( 58 goals)
- Biggest home win: VfL Wolfsburg 10–0 FSV Gütersloh 2009
- Biggest away win: VfL Sindelfingen 1–9 1. FFC Turbine Potsdam
- Highest scoring: VfL Sindelfingen 1–9 1. FFC Turbine Potsdam; VfL Wolfsburg 10–0 FSV Gütersloh 2009; FCR 2001 Duisburg 7–3 FSV Gütersloh 2009
- Highest attendance: 5,859; Wolfsburg 4–0 Bad Neuenahr
- Lowest attendance: 80; Sindelfingen 0–3 Duisburg

The 2012–13 season of the Frauen-Bundesliga was the 23rd season of Germany's premier women's football league. The season began on 1 September 2012 and ended on 12 May 2013. Turbine Potsdam were the defending champions.

The title was won by VfL Wolfsburg for the first time. Turbine Potsdam finished in second place and qualified for the UEFA Women's Champions League.

Duisburg and Bad Neuenahr went into administration during the season. As a result, Bad Neuenahr decided to withdraw from the league, sparing Sindelfingen from relegation.

== Changes from 2011–12 ==
SG Essen-Schönebeck was renamed SGS Essen and played their home games in the Stadion Essen.

== Teams ==
The teams promoted from the previous season's 2nd Bundesliga were VfL Sindelfingen as winners of the Southern division and FSV Gütersloh 2009 as runners-up of the Northern division.

Locations of teams in the 2012–13 Bundesliga

Team	Home city	Home ground
SC 07 Bad Neuenahr	Bad Neuenahr-Ahrweiler	Apollinarisstadion
Bayer 04 Leverkusen	Leverkusen	Ulrich-Haberland-Stadion (Amateur)
FC Bayern Munich	Munich	Sportpark Aschheim
FCR 2001 Duisburg	Duisburg	PCC-Stadion
SGS Essen	Essen	Stadion für Essen
1. FFC Frankfurt	Frankfurt	Stadion am Brentanobad
SC Freiburg	Freiburg	Möslestadion
FSV Gütersloh 2009	Gütersloh	Heidewaldstadion
FF USV Jena	Jena	Sportzentrum Oberaue
VfL Sindelfingen	Sindelfingen	Floschenstadion
1. FFC Turbine Potsdam	Potsdam	Karl-Liebknecht-Stadion
VfL Wolfsburg	Wolfsburg	VfL-Stadium

=== Managerial changes ===
Team	Outgoing manager	Manner of departure	Date of vacancy	Replaced by	Date of appointment	Position
1. FFC Frankfurt	Sven Kahlert	Sacked	12 September 2012	Philipp Dahm	13 September 2012	4th
FCR 2001 Duisburg	Marco Ketelaer	Mutual consent	31 December 2012	Petra Hauser	1 January 2013	9th
FCR 2001 Duisburg	Petra Hauser	Sacked	28 February 2013	Sven Kahlert	1 March 2013	9th
1. FFC Frankfurt	Philipp Dahm	Sacked	18 April 2013	Sascha Glass (interim)	18 April 2013	3rd

== League table ==
Pos	Team	Pld	W	D	L	GF	GA	GD	Pts	Qualification or relegation
1	VfL Wolfsburg (C)	22	17	2	3	71	16	+55	53	2013–14 UEFA Champions League Round of 32
2	1. FFC Turbine Potsdam	22	16	1	5	70	16	+54	49	2013–14 UEFA Champions League Round of 32
3	1. FFC Frankfurt	22	15	2	5	52	26	+26	47	
4	FC Bayern Munich	22	14	1	7	49	24	+25	43	
5	SC Freiburg	22	9	5	8	33	31	+2	32	
6	SGS Essen	22	8	6	8	26	30	−4	30	
7	SC 07 Bad Neuenahr (R)	22	8	6	8	25	29	−4	30	Club withdrawal
8	Bayer 04 Leverkusen	22	6	8	8	31	40	−9	26	
9	FCR 2001 Duisburg	22	7	3	12	37	47	−10	24	
10	FF USV Jena	22	6	4	12	24	47	−23	22	
11	VfL Sindelfingen	22	3	3	16	14	73	−59	12	
12	FSV Gütersloh 2009 (R)	22	2	1	19	19	72	−53	7	Relegation to 2013–14 2. Bundesliga

Source: kicker.de
Rules for classification: 1) points; 2) goal difference; 3) number of goals scored.
(C) Champions; (R) Relegated

== Results ==
Home \ Away	BAD	LEV	BAY	DUI	ESS	FRA	FRE	GÜT	JEN	SIN	POT	WOL
Bad Neuenahr		0–0	1–0	1–1	1–0	0–1	4–0	1–0	0–0	0–0	0–3	2–2
Bayer Leverkusen	1–1		2–1	1–1	0–0	0–3	1–1	3–0	1–2	4–0	2–4	1–4
Bayern Munich	2–1	3–2		2–2	2–1	2–1	0–2	8–0	4–0	2–0	2–0	3–0
MSV Duisburg	0–2	1–2	2–1		2–0	1–3	2–1	7–3	4–2	4–0	0–4	0–1
SGS Essen	1–2	0–0	2–0	2–0		3–1	2–3	2–1	2–2	2–1	1–0	0–0
FFC Frankfurt	4–1	4–2	1–2	5–2	1–0		1–0	1–1	2–1	7–0	1–0	2–0
Freiburg	1–0	2–2	0–3	2–1	1–1	3–1		4–1	2–0	1–1	1–3	1–2
FSV Gütersloh 2009	0–2	1–3	0–2	3–2	1–2	2–5	1–4		0–1	4–0	0–2	0–3
Jena	1–4	0–2	3–4	2–1	1–1	1–1	1–2	3–0		1–0	0–3	0–3
VfL Sindelfingen	3–1	2–2	0–4	0–3	0–3	0–3	3–2	2–1	1–2		1–9	0–6
Turbine Potsdam	5–1	3–0	2–1	6–1	5–1	1–2	0–0	5–0	6–0	6–0		2–0
Wolfsburg	4–0	7–0	2–1	4–0	6–0	4–2	1–0	10–0	4–1	6–0	2–1	

Source: kicker.de
Legend: Blue = home team win; Yellow = draw; Red = away team win.

== Top scorers ==
Ogimi won her first top-scorer award in the Bundesliga (women).

Rank	Scorer	Club	Goals
1	(Japan) Yūki Ōgimi	Turbine Potsdam	18
2	(Germany) Conny Pohlers	Wolfsburg	16
3	(Germany) Mandy Islacker	Duisburg	15
4	(Germany) Lena Lotzen	Bayern Munich	14
5	(Germany) Kerstin Garefrekes	Frankfurt	13
5	(United States) Sarah Hagen	Bayern Munich	13
7	(Equatorial Guinea) Genoveva Añonma	Turbine Potsdam	12
7	(Germany) Martina Müller	Wolfsburg	12
7	(Germany) Alexandra Popp	Wolfsburg	12
10	(Germany) Célia Okoyino da Mbabi	Bad Neuenahr	10
