= 2016–17 DFB-Pokal Frauen =

Tournament details
- Country: Germany
- Teams: 56

Final positions
- Champions: VfL Wolfsburg
- Runners-up: SC Sand

Tournament statistics
- Matches played: 55
- Goals scored: 249 (4.53 per match)
- Top goal scorer(s): Nina Burger; Annabel Jäger (5 goals)

The DFB-Pokal 2016–17 was the 37th season of the cup competition, Germany's second-most important competition in women's football.

== Results ==
=== First round ===
The draw was held on 15 July 2016. Matches will be played on 20 and 21 August 2016. Number in bracket is the league level. Eight best clubs of 2015–16 Bundesliga season received a bye.

Team 1	Score	Team 2
SV Alberweiler (IV)	0–9	MSV Duisburg (I)
FC Viktoria 1889 Berlin (III)	0–5	Arminia Bielefeld (II)
SSC Hagen Ahrensburg (IV)	1–2	Bramfelder SV (II)
Holstein Kiel (III)	0–15	SV Werder Bremen (II)
1. FC Lübars (IV)	0–12	Blau-Weiß Hohen Neuendorf (II)
FSV Hessen Wetzlar (II)	1–3	SC Sand (I)
1. FFC Fortuna Dresden (III)	2–0	SC Weyhe (IV)
1. FC Union Berlin (II)	1–6	BV Cloppenburg (II)
Karlsruher SC (IV)	1–5	Borussia Mönchengladbach (I)
Borussia Bocholt (III)	1–2	Hegauer FV (III)
TSV Sundhausen (IV)	0–4	Magdeburger FFC (III)
SV Henstedt-Ulzburg (II)	3–1	Herforder SV (II)
FSV Gütersloh 2009 (II)	2–2 (a.e.t.) (5–3 (p))	SV Meppen (II)
Arminia Ibbenbüren (IV)	5–1	FFV Leipzig (III)
FC Bergedorf 85 (III)	2–0	Blau-Weiß Beelitz (III)
SV Union Meppen (IV)	3–1	1. FC Neubrandenburg 04 (III)
1. FFC 08 Niederkirchen (II)	0–4	Bayer 04 Leverkusen (I)
SC Siegelbach (III)	0–2	SV 67 Weinberg (II)
TSG Neu-Isenburg (IV)	1–2	TSV Crailsheim (II)
1. FC Riegelsberg (III)	3–0	ETSV Würzburg (III)
1. FC Köln (II)	3–4	TSV Schott Mainz (II)
Alemannia Aachen (III)	0–8	VfL Sindelfingen (II)
1. FC Nürnberg (III)	1–2	1. FC Saarbrücken (II)
Sportfreunde Ippendorf (IV)	1–4	SG 99 Andernach (III)

=== Second round ===
Matches will be played on 8 and 9 October 2016. Eight best placed Bundesliga teams from last season join the 24 winners of the previous round.

Team 1	Score	Team 2
TSV Crailsheim (II)	1–2	SV 67 Weinberg (II)
Hegauer FV (III)	0–2	1. FFC Frankfurt (I)
1. FC Riegelsberg (III)	0–15	FC Bayern Munich (I)
SG 99 Andernach (III)	0–4	SC Freiburg (I)
1. FC Saarbrücken (II)	0–4	Bayer 04 Leverkusen (I)
TSV Schott Mainz (II)	0–4	SC Sand (I)
VfL Sindelfingen (II)	0–4	1899 Hoffenheim (I)
Arminia Ibbenbüren (IV)	3–3 a.e..t (5–3 p)	Bramfelder SV (II)
Arminia Bielefeld (II)	6–2	FSV Gütersloh 2009 (II)
SV Union Meppen (IV)	0–4	BV Cloppenburg (II)
1. FFC Fortuna Dresden (III)	0–9	VfL Wolfsburg (I)
Magdeburger FFC (III)	0–1	Borussia Mönchengladbach (I)
FC Bergedorf 85 (III)	0–5	SGS Essen (I)
Blau-Weiß Hohen Neuendorf (II)	1–3	FF USV Jena (I)
SV Werder Bremen (II)	1–1 a.e..t (5–4 p)	Turbine Potsdam (I)
SV Henstedt-Ulzburg (II)	0–5	MSV Duisburg (I)

=== Round of 16 ===
Matches were played from 2 to 21 December 2016.

Team 1	Score	Team 2
SV 67 Weinberg (II)	0–3	SC Sand (I)
BV Cloppenburg (II)	1–0	MSV Duisburg (I)
Bayer 04 Leverkusen (I)	5–0	FF USV Jena (I)
SV Werder Bremen (II)	1–0	1899 Hoffenheim (I)
Arminia Ibbenbüren (IV)	0–8	FC Bayern Munich (I)
1. FFC Frankfurt (I)	3–2	SGS Essen (I)
SC Freiburg (I)	2–0	Borussia Mönchengladbach (I)
Arminia Bielefeld (II)	0–2	VfL Wolfsburg (I)

=== Quarterfinals ===
Matches were played on 15 March 2017.

Team 1	Score	Team 2
SV Werder Bremen (II)	0–1	SC Sand (I)
FC Bayern Munich (I)	0–2	VfL Wolfsburg (I)
SC Freiburg (I)	2–0	1. FFC Frankfurt (I)
BV Cloppenburg (II)	0–2	Bayer 04 Leverkusen (I)

=== Semifinals ===
Matches were played on 16 April 2017.

16 April 2017
14:00

Bayer Leverkusen	0–4	SC Sand
	Report	Burger 10', 16', 61'; Damnjanović 35'

Nachwuchsleistungszentrum Kurtekotten, Leverkusen
Attendance: 1,095
Referee: Karoline Wacker

16 April 2017
15:00

SC Freiburg	1–2 (a.e.t.)	VfL Wolfsburg
Kayikçi 20'	Report	Hansen 52'; Pajor 96'

Möslestadion, Freiburg
Attendance: 1,225
Referee: Angelika Söder

=== Final ===
The final was played on 27 May 2017 in Cologne. It was a replay of last season's final, which Wolfsburg won 2–1.

27 May 2017
16:15 UTC+2

SC Sand	1–2	VfL Wolfsburg
Damnjanović 78'	Report	Harder 65', 75'

RheinEnergieStadion, Cologne
Attendance: 17,016
Referee: Ines Appelmann

Sand	Wolfsburg

GK	25	(Germany) Carina Schlüter
RB	17	(Germany) Claire Savin
CB	26	(Germany) Laura Vetterlein	(yellow card) 90+4'
CB	16	(Republic of Ireland) Diane Caldwell
LB	3	(Denmark) Cecilie Sandvej
RM	2	(Austria) Laura Feiersinger		(substituted off) 82'
CM	7	(Germany) Anne van Bonn (c)
CM	4	(United States) Chioma Igwe		(substituted off) 76'
LM	12	(Austria) Verena Aschauer		(substituted off) 71'
SS	19	(Austria) Nina Burger
CF	14	(Serbia) Jovana Damnjanović
Substitutes:
GK	31	(Germany) Sabrina Lang
DF	16	(Brazil) Letícia Santos
DF	20	(Slovakia) Jana Vojteková		(substituted on) 71'
MF	8	(Germany) Jennifer Gaugigl
MF	18	(Slovakia) Dominika Škorvánková	(yellow card) 80'	(substituted on) 76'
MF	23	(Switzerland) Isabelle Meyer
FW	13	(Bosnia and Herzegovina) Milena Nikolić		(substituted on) 82'
Manager:
Colin Bell

GK	1	(Germany) Almuth Schult
RB	9	(Germany) Anna Blässe
CB	4	(Sweden) Nilla Fischer (c)
CB	8	(Germany) Babett Peter
LB	27	(Germany) Isabel Kerschowski		(substituted off) 46'
DM	7	(Iceland) Sara Björk Gunnarsdóttir	(yellow card) 60' (yellow-red card) 90+5'
RW	26	(Norway) Caroline Graham Hansen
AM	11	(Germany) Alexandra Popp	(red card) 77'
AM	22	(Denmark) Pernille Harder
LW	10	(Belgium) Tessa Wullaert		(substituted off) 86'
CF	17	(Poland) Ewa Pajor		(substituted off) 81'
Substitutes:
GK	29	(Germany) Merle Frohms
DF	5	(New Zealand) Emily van Egmond		(substituted on) 86'
DF	16	(Switzerland) Noelle Maritz		(substituted on) 46'
DF	20	(Germany) Stephanie Bunte
DF	24	(Germany) Joelle Wedemeyer
MF	18	(Switzerland) Vanessa Bernauer		(substituted on) 81'
MF	30	(France) Élise Bussaglia
Manager:
Ralf Kellermann

Assistant referees:
Kathrin Heimann
Fabienne Michel
Fourth official:
Nadine Westerhoff

Match rules

- 90 minutes.
- 30 minutes of extra time if necessary.
- Penalty shoot-out if scores still level.
- Seven named substitutes, of which up to three may be used.

== Topscorers ==
Rank	Player	Team	Goals
1	(Austria) Nina Burger	SC Sand	5
1	(Germany) Annabel Jäger	Arminia Bielefeld	5
3	(Germany) Cindy König	Werder Bremen	4
3	(Netherlands) Vivianne Miedema	Bayern Munich	4
3	(Germany) Anja Mittag	VfL Wolfsburg	4
3	(Germany) Kathleen Radtke	MSV Duisburg	4
3	(Hungary) Erika Szuh	BW Hohen Neuendorf	4
8	(Germany) Jessica Golebiewski	Werder Bremen	3
8	(Germany) Charline Hartmann	SGS Essen	3
8	(Germany) Mandy Islacker	1. FFC Frankfurt	3
8	(Germany) Nadja Kleinikel	Borussia Mönchengladbach	3
8	(Germany) Kristin Kögel	VfL Sindelfingen	3
8	(Poland) Ewa Pajor	VfL Wolfsburg	3
8	(Germany) Stefanie Sanders	Werder Bremen	3
8	(Germany) Lisa Schwab	Bayer 04 Leverkusen	3
8	(Germany) Melissa Steffen	Arminia Ibbenbüren	3
8	(Netherlands) Stefanie van der Gragt	Bayern Munich	3
