= 2017–18 DFB-Pokal Frauen =

Tournament details
- Country: Germany
- Teams: 53

Final positions
- Champions: VfL Wolfsburg
- Runner-up: Bayern Munich

Tournament statistics
- Matches played: 55
- Goals scored: 228 (4.15 per match)
- Top goal scorer(s): Linda Dallmann; Sarah Grünheid; Jana Vojteková (4 goals)

The 2017–18 DFB-Pokal was the 38th season of the cup competition, Germany's second-most important title in women's football.

Wolfsburg defeated Bayern Munich after penalties to win their fourth consecutive title.

== Results ==
=== First round ===
The draw was held on 12 July 2017. Matches were played on 26 and 27 August 2017. The eleven best clubs of 2016–17 Bundesliga season received a bye.

Team 1	Score	Team 2
Herforder SV	2–3 (a.e.t.)	Arminia Bielefeld
SV Holzbach	0–2	TSV Schott Mainz
SV Alberweiler	1–0	SG Andernach
1. FC Riegelsberg	1–0	SV Walbeck
BSC Marzahn	1–3	BV Cloppenburg
SC Siegelbach	0–9	Borussia Mönchengladbach
ATS Buntentor	2–5	FSV Gütersloh
TSV Jahn Calden	1–2	Werder Bremen
Magdeburger FFC	4–1	TV Jahn Delmenhorst
TSV Limmer	2–1	BW Hohen Neuendorf
Bramfelder SV	0–2	SV Henstedt-Ulzburg
1. FFC Fortuna Dresden	0–0 (a.e.t.) (3–4 p)	Union Berlin
Holstein Kiel	0–5	SV Meppen
FSV Babelsberg	2–0	Weimarer FFC
1. FC Neubrandenburg	2–1 (a.e.t.)	Hamburger SV
Wacker Munich	0–2	1. FC Köln
Hessen Wetzlar	0–4	1. FC Saarbrücken
Vorwärts Spoho 98	1–3	1. FFC Niederkirchen
TSV Neckarau	0–1 (a.e.t.)	VfL Sindelfingen
Hegauer FV	4–2	SV 67 Weinberg
VfL Bochum	0–1	TSV Crailsheim

=== Second round ===
The draw was held on 28 August 2017. The matches were played on 7 and 8 October 2017. The eleven best placed Bundesliga teams from last season joined the 21 winners of the previous round.

Team 1	Score	Team 2
SV Alberweiler	0–3	Bayern Munich
TSV Limmer	1–6	SV Werder Bremen
1. FC Riegelsberg	0–13	SC Sand
1. FC Neubrandenburg	0–10	SGS Essen
FSV Babelsberg	0–9	SV Meppen
TSV Crailsheim	0–2	1. FC Köln
Arminia Bielefeld	2–1	MSV Duisburg
Magdeburger FFC	0–3	FF USV Jena
FSV Gütersloh	0–6	Turbine Potsdam
Union Berlin	0–6	VfL Wolfsburg
SV Henstedt-Ulzburg	2–6	BV Cloppenburg
1. FFC Niederkirchen	1–3	TSG Hoffenheim
Bayer 04 Leverkusen	0–6	1. FFC Frankfurt
TSV Schott Mainz	0–8	SC Freiburg
1. FC Saarbrücken	4–1	Borussia Mönchengladbach
Hegauer FV	0–2	VfL Sindelfingen

=== Round of 16 ===
The draw was held on 29 October 2017. Matches were played on 2 and 3 December 2017, while some games were postponed due to bad weather, but only one game was played on 13 December 2017, the other two games were postponed again. Those games were played on 9 and 11 February 2018.

Team 1	Score	Team 2
SV Meppen	0–4	Bayern Munich
Arminia Bielefeld	1–2	Turbine Potsdam
VfL Sindelfingen	1–3	1. FFC Frankfurt
1. FC Köln	1–2	SC Sand
SV Werder Bremen	0–5	SGS Essen
1. FC Saarbrücken	1–0	FF USV Jena
TSG Hoffenheim	0–2	SC Freiburg
BV Cloppenburg	0–5	VfL Wolfsburg

=== Quarterfinals ===
The draw was held on 7 January 2018. Matches were played on 13 and 14 March 2018.

Team 1	Score	Team 2
1. FC Saarbrücken	0–15	Bayern Munich
1. FFC Frankfurt	0–2	Turbine Potsdam
VfL Wolfsburg	2–1	SC Sand
SGS Essen	5–2 (a.e.t.)	SC Freiburg

=== Semifinals ===
The draw was held on 19 March 2018. Matches were played on 15 April 2018.

15 April 2018
15:15 (UTC+2)

VfL Wolfsburg	4–1	SGS Essen
Graham Hansen 17'; Harder 42', 47'; Gunnarsdóttir 86'	Report	Freutel 58'

AOK-Stadion, Wolfsburg
Attendance: 1,540
Referee: Angelika Söder

15 April 2018
15:15 (UTC+2)

Bayern Munich	3–1	Turbine Potsdam
Maier 29'; Wenninger 47'; Rolser 86'	Report	Prašnikar 89'

Grünwalder Stadion, Munich
Attendance: 1,184
Referee: Marina Wozniak

=== Final ===
The final was held on 19 May 2018 at the RheinEnergieStadion in Cologne.

19 May 2018
15:00 (UTC+2)

VfL Wolfsburg	0–0 (a.e.t.)	Bayern Munich
	Report
Penalties
Kerschowski (penalty scored); Jakabfi (penalty missed); Masar (penalty missed); Harder (penalty scored); Hansen (penalty scored)	3–2	(penalty missed) Behringer; (penalty missed) Demann; (penalty scored) Islacker; (penalty missed) Voňková; (penalty scored) Laudehr

RheinEnergieStadion, Cologne
Attendance: 14,692
Referee: Sandra Stolz

Wolfsburg	Bayern Munich

GK	1	(Germany) Almuth Schult
RB	9	(Germany) Anna Blässe		(substituted off) 66'
CB	4	(Sweden) Nilla Fischer (c)
CB	28	(Germany) Lena Goeßling
LB	16	(Switzerland) Noelle Maritz	(yellow card) 76'
DM	7	(Iceland) Sara Björk Gunnarsdóttir	(yellow card) 80'
RM	21	(Switzerland) Lara Dickenmann		(substituted off) 106'
CM	22	(Denmark) Pernille Harder
CM	5	(Portugal) Cláudia Neto		(substituted off) 91'
LM	26	(Norway) Caroline Graham Hansen
CF	17	(Poland) Ewa Pajor		(substituted off) 118'
Substitutes:
GK	29	(Germany) Merle Frohms
DF	6	(Germany) Katharina Baunach
DF	24	(Germany) Joelle Wedemeyer	(yellow card) 105'	(substituted in) 91'
MF	3	(Hungary) Zsanett Jakabfi	(yellow card) 120'	(substituted in) 106'
MF	27	(Germany) Isabel Kerschowski		(substituted in) 66'
MF	30	(United States) Ella Masar		(substituted in) 118'
FW	10	(Belgium) Tessa Wullaert
Manager:
(Germany) Stephan Lerch

GK	31	(Austria) Manuela Zinsberger
RB	19	(Austria) Carina Wenninger
CB	4	(Germany) Kristin Demann
CB	22	(Germany) Verena Faißt
LB	20	(Germany) Leonie Maier	(yellow card) 111'
DM	7	(Germany) Melanie Behringer (c)
RM	33	(Germany) Sara Däbritz		(substituted off) 103'
LM	10	(Netherlands) Jill Roord		(substituted off) 64'
AM	8	(Germany) Melanie Leupolz		(substituted off) 99'
FW	14	(Sweden) Fridolina Rolfö
FW	29	(Germany) Nicole Rolser		(substituted off) 117'
Substitutes:
GK	28	(Netherlands) Jacintha Weimar
DF	2	(United States) Gina Lewandowski
DF	21	(Germany) Simone Laudehr		(substituted in) 99'
DF	25	(Austria) Viktoria Schnaderbeck
MF	18	(Slovakia) Dominika Škorvánková	(yellow card) 90+3'	(substituted in) 64'
FW	13	(Czech Republic) Lucie Voňková		(substituted in) 117'
FW	23	(Germany) Mandy Islacker		(substituted in) 103'
Manager:
(Germany) Thomas Wörle

Assistant referees:
Vanessa Arlt
Katia Kobelt
Fourth official:
Christine Weigelt

Match rules

- 90 minutes.
- 30 minutes of extra time if necessary.
- Penalty shoot-out if scores still level.
- Seven named substitutes.
- Maximum of three substitutions, with a fourth allowed in extra time.
