= 2019–20 2. Frauen-Bundesliga =

2. Frauen-Bundesliga
- Season: 2019–20
- Dates: 10 August 2019 – 1 March 2020
- Champions: Werder Bremen
- Promoted: Werder Bremen; SV Meppen
- Matches played: 112
- Goals scored: 432 (3.86 per match)
- Top goalscorer: Laura Lindner (16 goals)
- Biggest home win: Bremen 8–1 Potsdam
- Biggest away win: Saarbrücken 0–4 Bremen; Mönchengladbach 0–4 Bielefeld; Frankfurt 2–6 Andernach; Bielefeld 1–5 Meppen
- Highest scoring: Saarbrücken 7–4 Ingolstadt
- Attendance: 16,715 (149 per match)

The 2019–20 2. Frauen-Bundesliga was the 16th season of Germany's second-tier women's football league, and the second as a single-division league. The season began on 10 August 2019 and ended on 1 March 2020. The champions and runners-up were promoted to the Frauen-Bundesliga, while no teams were relegated to the Frauen-Regionalliga.

The season was cancelled on 1 March 2020.

== Effects of the COVID-19 pandemic ==
Due to the COVID-19 pandemic in Germany, on 8 March 2020 the Federal Minister of Health, Jens Spahn recommended cancelling events with more than 1,000 people. On 13 March, the DFB announced that fixtures on matchday 17 (13–15 March) were postponed. On 16 March, it was announced that the league was suspended until 19 April. On 3 April, the suspension was extended until 30 April. A decision on the resumption of the competition, similar to the Bundesliga and 2. Bundesliga, took place at an extraordinary meeting of the DFB-Bundestag on 25 May 2020. During that meeting, it was announced that the season would be cancelled with two teams getting promoted and none relegated.

== Teams ==
Locations of teams in the 2019–20 2. Frauen-Bundesliga

=== Team changes ===
Entering league		Exiting league	
Promoted from 2018–19 Regionalliga	Relegated from 2018–19 Bundesliga	Promoted to 2019–20 Bundesliga	Relegated to 2019–20 Regionalliga
SG Andernach; Arminia Bielefeld; FC Ingolstadt	Borussia Mönchengladbach; Werder Bremen	1. FC Köln; USV Jena	Hessen Wetzlar; SV Weinberg; SGS Essen II

=== Stadiums ===
Team	Home city	Home ground	Capacity
SG Andernach	Andernach	Stadionstraße	
Arminia Bielefeld	Bielefeld	Sportplatz Stadtheide	
Werder Bremen	Bremen	Weserstadion Platz 12	1,000
BV Cloppenburg	Cloppenburg	PK Sportpark	5,001
1. FFC Frankfurt II	Frankfurt	Stadion am Brentanobad	5,200
FSV Gütersloh	Gütersloh	Tönnies-Arena	4,252
1899 Hoffenheim II	Sinsheim	Ensinger-Stadion	4,000
FC Ingolstadt	Ingolstadt	Audi Sportpark	
SV Meppen	Meppen	Hänsch-Arena	16,500
Borussia Mönchengladbach	Mönchengladbach	Grenzlandstadion	10,000
Bayern Munich II	Aschheim	Sportpark Aschheim	3,000
Turbine Potsdam II	Potsdam	Sportforum Waldstadt	5,000
1. FC Saarbrücken	Saarbrücken	Kieselhumes	12,000
VfL Wolfsburg II	Wolfsburg	AOK Stadion	5,200

== League table ==
Pos	Team	Pld	W	D	L	GF	GA	GD	Pts	Promotion
1	Werder Bremen (C, P)	16	12	4	0	45	13	+32	40	Promotion to Bundesliga
2	VfL Wolfsburg II (Note: Reserve teams cannot compete in the Frauen-Bundesliga and therefore were ineligible for promotion.)	16	9	2	5	32	16	+16	29	
3	1899 Hoffenheim II	16	8	5	3	37	27	+10	29	
4	SV Meppen (P)	16	8	3	5	29	27	+2	27	Promotion to Bundesliga
5	Borussia Mönchengladbach	16	8	2	6	30	32	−2	26	
6	FC Ingolstadt	16	6	4	6	33	32	+1	22	
7	Turbine Potsdam II	16	7	1	8	39	43	−4	22	
8	Bayern Munich II	16	6	3	7	24	32	−8	21	
9	FSV Gütersloh	16	6	2	8	28	28	0	20	
10	BV Cloppenburg	16	3	7	6	27	38	−11	16	
11	SG Andernach	16	5	1	10	27	40	−13	16	
12	1. FC Saarbrücken (Note: Originally the bottom three placed teams would have been relegated, but after the season was cancelled because of the COVID-19 pandemic in Germany, it was announced that no team was relegated.)	16	5	1	10	26	39	−13	16	
13	1. FFC Frankfurt II	16	3	6	7	28	32	−4	15	
14	Arminia Bielefeld	16	4	3	9	27	33	−6	15	

Source: DFB
Rules for classification: 1) Points; 2) Goal difference; 3) Goals scored; 4) Head-to-head points; 5) Head-to-head goal difference; 6) Head-to-head goals scored; 7) Head-to-head away goals scored; 8) Away goals scored; 9) Play-off.
(C) Champions; (P) Promoted

== Results ==
Home \ Away	AND	BIE	BRE	CLO	FR2	GÜT	HO2	ING	MEP	MÖN	MU2	PO2	SAA	WO2
SG Andernach	—	—	—	3–5	—	2–3	1–0	—	1–3	0–1	1–4	—	2–1	2–5
Arminia Bielefeld	1–2	—	2–3	1–1	—	—	3–3	0–1	1–5	3–0	1–2	—	0–2	—
Werder Bremen	3–0	—	—	—	4–0	1–0	—	2–0	—	2–2	2–0	8–1	5–1	2–0
BV Cloppenburg	—	—	2–2	—	1–3	3–3	0–4	—	—	1–3	2–0	—	2–2	0–4
1. FFC Frankfurt II	2–6	0–2	—	—	—	1–1	—	2–2	8–0	2–3	1–1	4–0	—	0–0
FSV Gütersloh	—	2–0	—	0–2	—	—	—	—	1–4	—	6–1	1–2	3–0	0–2
1899 Hoffenheim II	3–2	—	2–2	3–3	1–1	2–4	—	1–1	—	3–1	—	—	—	1–0
FC Ingolstadt	1–2	2–1	—	3–1	2–2	2–1	—	—	4–1	3–4	—	2–0	—	2–3
SV Meppen	2–0	—	1–2	1–1	3–0	—	2–0	1–4	—	—	0–0	—	1–0	—
Borussia Mönchengladbach	—	0–4	2–2	—	—	3–1	—	—	1–0	—	3–0	2–4	—	1–0
Bayern Munich II	—	3–3	0–1	—	4–1	—	3–4	2–1	—	—	—	—	1–0	—
Turbine Potsdam II	5–1	3–4	—	3–3	—	3–1	2–4	—	2–3	3–2	2–3	—	4–0	—
1. FC Saarbrücken	—	—	0–4	3–0	2–1	—	0–3	7–4	—	4–2	—	3–4	—	—
VfL Wolfsburg II	1–1	4–1	—	—	—	0–1	1–3	—	3–0	—	4–0	2–1	3–1	—

Source: DFB
Legend: Blue = home team win; Yellow = draw; Red = away team win.

== Top scorers ==
Rank	Player	Club	Goals
1	(Germany) Laura Lindner	Turbine Potsdam II	16
2	(Germany) Sarah Grünheid	Arminia Bielefeld	14
3	(Germany) Selina Cerci	Werder Bremen	13
4	(Germany) Ramona Maier	FC Ingolstadt	10
5	(Germany) Marlene Müller	Turbine Potsdam II	9
6	(Jordan) Sarah Abu-Sabbah	Borussia Mönchengladbach	8
6	(Germany) Jannelle Flaws	BV Cloppenburg	8
6	(Germany) Giovanna Hoffmann	Werder Bremen	8
6	(Germany) Chiara Loos	1. FC Saarbrücken	8
10	(Germany) Maike Berentzen	SV Meppen	7
10	(Germany) Cindy König	Werder Bremen	7
10	(Germany) Annalena Rieke	FSV Gütersloh	7
