= 2025–26 Frauen-Regionalliga =

Frauen-Regionalliga
- Season: 2025–26
- Dates: 22 August 2024 – 1 June 2025
- Champions: Holstein Kiel; Hertha BSC; TSG Hoffenheim II; 1. FC Saarbrücken; 1. FC Köln II
- Promoted: TSG Hoffenheim II
- Relegated: TSV Barmke; SC Victoria Hamburg; SV Hastenbeck; Fortuna Dresden; Wacker München; SG Haitz; VfL Herrenberg; Wormatia Worms; SV Ober-Olm; Borussia Mönchengladbach II; Deutz 05; GSV 1910 Moers
- Matches: 696
- Goals: 2,637 (3.79 per match)
- Biggest home win: 10–0 (Werder Bremen II vs TSV Barmke, Holstein Kiel vs ATS Buntentor)
- Biggest away win: 0–10 (Hansa Rostock vs Hertha BSC)

The 2025–26 season of the Frauen-Regionalliga will be the 22nd season of Germany's third-tier women's football league.

As opposed to the 2024–25 season, 2025–26 sees only the Regionalliga Süd champion being promoted automatically, with the other champions determining the other two promoted teams in respective two-legged play-offs.

== Tiebreakers for league ranking ==
The following criteria are applied (in order from top to bottom) to determine the order of the teams in the leagues:

- The total number of points;
- Goal difference in all league matches;
- Number of goals scored in all league matches;
- Total number of points obtained in head-to-head matches;
- Number of away goals scored in head-to-head matches;
- Number of away goals scored in all league matches;

If two teams are still tied after all the above criteria are applied, a play-off match is held at a neutral ground to determine the order.

== Regionalliga Nord ==
Locations of teams in the 2024–25 Frauen-Regionalliga Nord.

The season will begin on 30 August 2025 and is scheduled to end on 31 May 2026.

Pos	Team	Pld	W	D	L	GF	GA	GD	Pts	Qualification or relegation
1	Holstein Kiel	22	17	3	2	70	10	+60	54	Qualification for Promotion Play-Offs for the 2. Bundesliga
2	SV Henstedt-Ulzburg	22	14	4	4	61	26	+35	46	
3	SpVg Aurich	22	13	4	5	49	25	+24	43	
4	Hamburger SV II	22	11	5	6	43	29	+14	38	
5	Hannover 96	22	11	4	7	54	39	+15	37	
6	Eimsbütteler TV	22	9	6	7	44	36	+8	33	
7	Werder Bremen II	22	7	5	10	42	39	+3	26	
8	FC St. Pauli	22	5	9	8	27	27	0	24	
9	ATS Buntentor	22	7	3	12	28	54	−26	24	
10	TSV Barmke	22	7	3	12	23	56	−33	24	Relegation to Oberliga
11	SC Victoria Hamburg	22	5	1	16	26	64	−38	16	Relegation to Oberliga
12	SV Hastenbeck	22	2	1	19	15	77	−62	7	Relegation to Oberliga

Source: Fussball.de
Rules for classification: 1) Points; 2) Goal difference; 3) Goals scored; 4) Head-to-head results; 5) Head-to-head away goals scored; 6) Away goals scored; 7) Play-off.

=== Results ===
Home \ Away	AUR	BAR	BRE	BUN	EIM	HSV	VHA	HAN	HAS	HEN	KIE	STP
SpVg Aurich		4–0	0–3	3–1	1–1	2–2	3–0	1–1	5–1	1–2	2–0	2–1
TSV Barmke	0–3		2–2	1–0	1–2	1–5	2–0	2–0	2–0	4–3	0–2	1–1
Werder Bremen II	0–4	10–0		0–3	3–4	0–4	6–1	0–0	4–1	3–5	0–3	0–0
ATS Buntentor	1–0	1–2	1–1		1–3	0–3	0–3	1–0	3–1	1–4	0–4	1–1
Eimsbütteler TV	5–0	2–0	0–2	5–1		1–3	4–1	2–2	2–0	0–0	1–2	1–1
Hamburger SV II	1–1	4–0	2–1	0–1	1–1		4–1	1–0	3–0	1–4	0–4	2–1
SC Victoria Hamburg	1–5	3–1	1–3	1–4	1–1	0–2		1–4	3–1	0–3	0–6	2–1
Hannover 96	1–3	3–2	3–1	5–0	7–2	4–1	4–2		3–1	4–3	2–2	1–3
SV Hastenbeck	0–5	0–1	0–2	0–7	0–4	3–2	2–3	0–4		2–2	0–6	2–1
SV Henstedt-Ulzburg	0–2	6–1	1–0	6–0	2–1	2–2	2–0	4–2	9–0		0–2	2–0
Holstein Kiel	3–0	5–0	3–0	10–0	4–0	0–0	3–1	6–1	2–1	0–1		3–1
FC St. Pauli	1–2	0–0	1–1	1–1	3–2	2–0	3–1	1–3	4–0	0–0	0–0	

Source: Fussball.de
Legend: Blue = home team win; Yellow = draw; Red = away team win.

=== Top scorers ===
Rank	Player	Club	Goals
1	(Germany) Kira Hasse	Holstein Kiel	21
2	(Germany) Indra Hahn	SV Henstedt-Ulzburg	17
3	(Germany) Nele Obara	Hannover 96	15
4	(Germany) Ana-Carolin Hoffmann	SpVg Aurich	12
5	(Germany) Dorothea Greulich	SpVg Aurich	11
6	(Germany) Leonie Dombrowa	Hannover 96	10
6	(Germany) Jennifer Michel	SV Henstedt-Ulzburg	10
8	(Germany) Sarah Begunk	Holstein Kiel	9
8	(Albania) Arjela Lako	Holstein Kiel	9
10	(Germany) Julia Dose	Hannover 96	8
10	(Germany) Lara Frisch	SpVg Aurich	8
10	(Germany) Amelie-Sophie Töpfer	Werder Bremen II	8
10	(Germany) Emilia Ingrid van Gunst	SV Henstedt-Ulzburg	8

== Regionalliga Nordost ==
The season will begin on 30 August 2025 and is scheduled to end on 31 May 2026.

Locations of teams in the 2024–25 Frauen-Regionalliga Nordost.

Pos	Team	Pld	W	D	L	GF	GA	GD	Pts	Qualification or relegation
1	Hertha BSC	22	19	2	1	84	13	+71	59	Qualification for Promotion Play-Offs for the 2. Bundesliga
2	RB Leipzig II (Note: Reserve teams cannot compete at the same league level as the respective main team. Ineligible for promotion if the main team gets relegated to 2. Bundesliga.)	22	16	2	4	95	27	+68	50	
3	1. FC Magdeburg	22	13	7	2	55	26	+29	46	
4	Union Berlin II	22	12	4	6	49	42	+7	40	
5	Carl Zeiss Jena II	22	11	4	7	52	29	+23	37	
6	Leipzig-Süd	22	11	4	7	47	37	+10	37	
7	1. FFV Erfurt	22	8	2	12	26	44	−18	26	
8	Turbine Potsdam II (Note: Reserve teams cannot compete at the same league level as the respective main team. Ineligible for promotion unless the main team earns promotion to Bundesliga.)	22	6	3	13	28	52	−24	21	
9	Türkiyemspor Berlin	22	5	4	13	29	52	−23	19	
10	SV BW Hohen Neuendorf	22	5	3	14	19	59	−40	18	
11	Hansa Rostock	22	4	2	16	24	77	−53	14	
12	Fortuna Dresden	22	2	3	17	19	69	−50	9	Relegation to lower-level leagues

Source: Fussball.de
Rules for classification: Tiebreakers

=== Results ===
Home \ Away	BEH	BET	BU2	DRE	ERF	NEU	JE2	LE2	LES	MAG	PO2	ROS
Hertha BSC		3–0	2–0	9–1	5–0	5–0	3–2	2–3	1–1	3–1	5–0	4–0
Türkiyemspor Berlin	0–4		1–4	1–1	0–2	1–0	2–3	4–3	1–3	1–3	0–0	4–1
Union Berlin II	2–9	3–1		7–0	3–0	4–1	4–2	3–8	1–2	2–1	5–1	3–0
Fortuna Dresden	0–5	0–3	1–1		0–1	2–3	1–2	0–7	3–3	2–4	1–2	1–0
1. FFV Erfurt	0–4	1–2	3–0	2–0		1–1	2–1	1–6	0–2	1–2	1–1	4–1
SV BW Hohen Neuendorf	0–3	1–1	0–1	0–3	2–1		0–7	0–4	0–2	0–0	3–1	1–4
Carl Zeiss Jena II	0–1	1–1	0–0	5–0	2–0	3–0		1–3	2–0	1–2	3–0	6–2
RB Leipzig II	1–2	6–0	1–2	5–0	4–0	4–0	2–3		5–1	2–2	6–0	8–0
Leipzig-Süd	1–2	3–2	1–1	3–2	5–2	3–0	1–1	2–3		3–5	4–0	4–1
1. FC Magdeburg	1–1	4–0	6–0	1–0	3–1	5–0	3–3	1–1	3–0		2–1	3–1
Turbine Potsdam II	0–1	2–1	1–2	3–0	0–2	3–4	2–0	3–5	2–0	2–2		4–3
Hansa Rostock	0–10	4–3	1–1	2–1	0–1	1–3	0–4	0–8	0–3	1–1	2–0	

Source: Fussball.de
Legend: Blue = home team win; Yellow = draw; Red = away team win.

=== Top scorers ===
Rank	Player	Club	Goals
1	(Germany) Natalie Grenz	RB Leipzig II	28
2	(Germany) Elfie Wellhausen	Hertha BSC	27
3	(Germany) Alexandra Scheffler	RB Leipzig II	14
4	(Germany) Neele Abraham	1. FC Magdeburg	13
4	(Germany) Maleen Jankowski	Leipzig-Süd	13
4	(Germany) Janita Kramer	RB Leipzig II	13
7	(Germany) Elly Böttcher	Hertha BSC	12
7	(Germany) Angelina Lübcke	Türkiyemspor Berlin	12
9	(Germany) Emy Bührig	Carl Zeiss Jena II	11
10	(Germany) Johanna Seifert	Hertha BSC	10

== Regionalliga Süd ==
Locations of teams in the 2025–26 Frauen-Regionalliga Süd.

Pos	Team	Pld	W	D	L	GF	GA	GD	Pts	Qualification or relegation
1	TSG Hoffenheim II (Note: Reserve teams cannot compete at the same league level as the respective main team. Ineligible for promotion if the main team gets relegated to 2. Bundesliga.)	22	17	3	2	51	15	+36	54	Promotion to the 2. Bundesliga
2	SV 67 Weinberg	22	14	2	6	46	29	+17	44	
3	Kickers Offenbach	22	13	0	9	38	30	+8	39	
4	Karlsruher SC	22	12	2	8	46	30	+16	38	
5	SpVgg Greuther Fürth	22	11	3	8	54	37	+17	36	
6	SC Freiburg II	22	9	4	9	43	40	+3	31	
7	SC Sand II (Note: Reserve teams cannot compete at the same league level as the respective main team. Ineligible for promotion unless the main team earns promotion to Bundesliga.)	22	9	3	10	48	40	+8	30	
8	Hessen Kassel	22	8	3	11	42	50	−8	27	
9	Eintracht Frankfurt III (Note: Reserve teams cannot compete at the same league level as the respective main team. Being the 2^{nd} reserve, the team is ineligible for promotion no matter the circumstances.)	22	8	2	12	39	50	−11	26	
10	Wacker München	22	6	5	11	24	43	−19	23	Relegation to lower-level leagues
11	SG Haitz	22	6	0	16	25	61	−36	18	Relegation to lower-level leagues
12	VfL Herrenberg	22	5	1	16	23	54	−31	16	Relegation to lower-level leagues
13	Hessen Wetzlar (Note: FSV Hessen Wetzlar withdrew from the Frauen-Regionalliga Süd on 17 September 2025. Subsequently, all their results were expunged. At the time of their withdrawal, they were in 13th place with 3 losses (0 points) and a goal difference of 0–12 (−12).)	0	0	0	0	0	0	0	0	Relegation to lower-level leagues

Source: Fussball.de
Rules for classification: Tiebreakers

=== Results ===
Home \ Away	FR3	FR2	FUR	HAI	HER	HO2	KAR	HES	MUN	OFF	SA2	WEI
Eintracht Frankfurt III		1–4	1–6	0–1	3–0	0–2	4–1	4–5	0–1	0–2	2–4	1–1
SC Freiburg II	3–4		4–1	3–2	1–1	0–1	2–2	3–1	3–0	2–3	0–4	0–1
SpVgg Greuther Fürth	5–0	0–4		2–1	2–1	0–2	3–1	2–1	5–1	2–3	2–1	1–1
SG Haitz	1–3	0–2	1–7		0–5	1–5	1–0	3–0	2–1	0–1	2–5	3–1
VfL Herrenberg	0–5	1–4	1–6	5–1		1–5	0–3	2–1	2–1	1–0	1–6	0–2
TSG Hoffenheim II	1–2	2–2	4–0	1–0	2–0		2–0	2–0	1–1	3–0	1–1	1–0
Karlsruher SC	2–0	4–0	2–1	6–0	3–0	0–2		2–1	0–0	4–1	5–1	2–3
Hessen Kassel	2–2	3–0	3–3	4–1	1–0	0–5	3–4		6–3	3–2	2–5	1–3
Wacker München	3–2	2–2	0–3	1–2	1–0	1–2	2–0	0–0		2–1	0–0	2–1
Kickers Offenbach	0–2	3–0	2–1	1–0	3–0	3–1	2–3	0–1	3–1		2–1	3–0
SC Sand II	2–3	1–2	1–1	4–2	2–1	1–2	1–2	1–2	3–1	0–3		2–4
SV 67 Weinberg	4–0	3–2	2–1	4–1	2–1	2–4	1–0	3–2	5–0	3–0	0–2	

Source: Fussball.de
Legend: Blue = home team win; Yellow = draw; Red = away team win.

=== Top scorers ===
Rank	Player	Club	Goals
1	(Germany) Melissa Zweigner	Karlsruher SC	18
2	(Germany) Johanna Hildebrandt	Hessen Kassel	15
3	(Germany) Mathilda Dillmann	Karlsruher SC	11
3	(Germany) Daniela Schwarz	SC Sand II	11
3	(Germany) Luisa Wölfel	SpVgg Greuther Fürth	11
6	(Kosovo) Sara Sahiti	TSG Hoffenheim II	10
7	(Germany) Anna Hofrichter	SV 67 Weinberg	9
7	(Japan) Sari Kobayashi	Eintracht Frankfurt III	9
7	(Germany) Weena Simmen	SC Freiburg II	9
10	(Italy) Aurora Tornaquindici	SpVgg Greuther Fürth	8

== Regionalliga Südwest ==
Locations of teams in the 2024–25 Frauen-Regionalliga Südwest.

Pos	Team	Pld	W	D	L	GF	GA	GD	Pts	Qualification or relegation
1	1. FC Saarbrücken	22	21	1	0	104	5	+99	64	Qualification for Promotion Play-Offs for the 2. Bundesliga
2	1. FSV Mainz 05 II (Note: Reserve teams cannot compete at the same league level as the respective main team. Ineligible for promotion unless the main team earns promotion to Bundesliga.)	22	16	1	5	55	27	+28	49	
3	SV Elversberg	22	15	3	4	62	22	+40	48	
4	SC 13 Bad Neuenahr	22	13	2	7	55	28	+27	41	
5	1. FC Riegelsberg	22	13	1	8	48	44	+4	40	
6	1. FFC Montabaur	22	12	2	8	59	26	+33	38	
7	TuS Issel	22	11	3	8	55	47	+8	36	
8	SG 99 Andernach II	22	8	3	11	30	46	−16	27	
9	FC Urbar	22	5	0	17	20	77	−57	15	
10	SC Siegelbach	22	4	1	17	16	69	−53	13	Relegation to lower-level leagues
11	Wormatia Worms	22	3	1	18	27	76	−49	10	Relegation to lower-level leagues
12	SV Ober-Olm	22	2	0	20	24	88	−64	6	Relegation to lower-level leagues

Source: Fussball.de
Rules for classification: Tiebreakers

=== Results ===
Home \ Away	AN2	BDN	ELV	ISS	MAI	MON	OOL	RIE	SAA	SIE	URB	WOR
SG 99 Andernach II		2–0	0–4	2–1	1–5	0–2	3–0	1–3	0–6	3–0	1–0	3–1
SC 13 Bad Neuenahr	4–1		1–2	0–1	3–0	2–1	6–1	5–0	0–3	3–0	6–0	6–1
SV Elversberg	3–1	1–1		5–1	1–0	1–1	2–0	7–0	2–2	4–0	2–0	2–0
TuS Issel	1–1	1–1	4–1		2–2	2–3	7–1	4–0	0–4	2–1	2–0	5–4
1. FSV Mainz 05 II	5–0	2–0	2–1	2–1		4–3	2–1	4–2	1–5	3–0	4–0	3–0
1. FFC Montabaur	1–2	3–1	1–2	5–1	1–2		7–0	0–2	0–2	8–0	2–0	6–1
SV Ober-Olm	0–6	1–5	0–6	3–4	0–2	0–2		1–6	0–8	5–1	2–3	2–3
1. FC Riegelsberg	2–0	1–3	3–0	2–1	2–1	0–0	4–2		0–5	2–1	2–1	8–1
1. FC Saarbrücken	4–0	7–0	3–0	4–0	3–0	2–1	7–0	4–0		2–0	7–0	7–1
SC Siegelbach	1–1	0–2	0–7	0–6	1–3	0–5	1–0	2–1	0–6		1–3	0–2
FC Urbar	2–1	0–2	2–7	2–3	0–7	1–5	2–1	1–5	0–8	1–3		1–0
Wormatia Worms	1–1	0–4	0–2	4–6	0–1	1–2	1–4	0–3	0–5	0–4	6–1	

Source: Fussball.de
Legend: Blue = home team win; Yellow = draw; Red = away team win.

=== Top scorers ===
Rank	Player	Club	Goals
1	(Germany) Lara Martin	1. FC Saarbrücken	28
2	(Germany) Marie Fischer	1. FFC Montabaur	22
3	(Germany) Hannah Engel	SV Elversberg	16
4	(Germany) Anne Blesius	TuS Issel	13
5	(Germany) Ina Keller	SV Elversberg	12
6	(Germany) Chelsea Agyei	1. FC Saarbrücken	11
6	(Germany) Antonia Dietsch	TuS Issel	11
6	(Germany) Melanie Jung	1. FC Riegelsberg	11
6	(Germany) Joelina Martini	SG 99 Andernach II	11
10	(England) Sarah Clarke	1. FSV Mainz 05 II	10

== Regionalliga West ==
Locations of teams in the 2024–25 Frauen-Regionalliga West.

Pos	Team	Pld	W	D	L	GF	GA	GD	Pts	Qualification or relegation
1	1. FC Köln II (Note: Reserve teams cannot compete at the same league level as the respective main team. Ineligible for promotion if the main team gets relegated to 2. Bundesliga.)	26	22	2	2	98	26	+72	68	Qualification for Promotion Play-Offs for the 2. Bundesliga
2	Borussia Dortmund	26	21	3	2	114	13	+101	66	
3	Arminia Bielefeld	26	18	2	6	71	30	+41	56	
4	SC Fortuna Köln	26	13	6	7	46	40	+6	45	
5	Bayer Leverkusen II	26	12	7	7	64	49	+15	43	
6	SGS Essen II	26	12	5	9	70	51	+19	41	
7	1. FFC Recklinghausen	26	10	5	11	49	55	−6	35	
8	DJK Wacker Mecklenbeck	26	10	3	13	32	37	−5	33	
9	SSV Rhade	26	8	5	13	31	52	−21	29	
10	Vorwärts Spoho Köln	26	7	7	12	42	67	−25	28	
11	FSV Gütersloh 2009	26	5	9	12	37	43	−6	24	
12	Borussia Mönchengladbach II (Note: Reserve teams cannot compete at the same league level as the respective main team. Ineligible for promotion unless the main team earns promotion to Bundesliga.)	26	4	10	12	35	70	−35	22	Relegation to lower-level leagues
13	Deutz 05	26	5	3	18	25	77	−52	18	Relegation to lower-level leagues
14	GSV 1910 Moers	26	0	3	23	12	116	−104	3	Relegation to lower-level leagues

Source: Fussball.de
Rules for classification: Tiebreakers

=== Results ===
Home \ Away	BIE	DEU	DOR	ES2	GUT	KF2	KFO	KVS	LE2	MEC	MO2	MOE	REC	RHA
Arminia Bielefeld		8–0	1–1	3–2	4–2	4–1	1–2	4–1	0–4	4–0	8–0	3–0	4–2	1–2
Deutz 05	0–2		2–0 (Note: The match initially ended in a 3–0 victory for Borussia Dortmund, but the result was subsequently overturned and awarded to Deutz 05 because Dortmund had fielded an ineligible player.)	1–4	1–1	0–6	0–1	1–5	3–3	1–3	2–1	4–1	0–1	0–3
Borussia Dortmund	1–1	7–0		4–0	3–1	1–1	6–0	8–0	6–0	5–0	7–0	9–0	6–0	3–1
SGS Essen II	1–4	4–1	0–7		1–3	3–3	2–1	1–1	1–1	4–0	5–0	6–0	2–1	2–1
FSV Gütersloh 2009	0–6	0–1	0–2	2–2		0–1	0–2	2–0	0–0	2–1	2–2	8–0	0–1	0–2
1. FC Köln II	3–0	4–1	4–3	6–1	2–1		4–0	8–0	7–2	2–0	7–3	9–0	2–0	6–1
SC Fortuna Köln	3–0	4–1	0–3	2–2	2–0	0–3		2–2	3–1	0–0	1–1	2–0	4–1	0–0
Vorwärts Spoho Köln	1–2	1–1	0–4	3–1	3–3	1–5	3–4		2–2	2–0	2–2	2–0	1–6	3–1
Bayer Leverkusen II	3–1	4–1	0–4	3–2	2–1	2–3	3–1	3–1		1–1	1–1	5–1	3–2	2–1
DJK Wacker Mecklenbeck	0–1	5–0	0–1	1–2	1–1	2–1	0–3	2–1	1–4		1–2	1–0	1–2	2–0
Borussia Mönchengladbach II	0–3	2–0	1–4	0–2	2–2	0–2	4–1	1–2	0–3	1–6		2–2	2–2	1–1
GSV 1910 Moers	1–2	1–2	0–6	0–16	1–5	0–2	0–3	0–4	0–7	0–2	1–1		2–4	2–2
1. FFC Recklinghausen	0–3	3–1	1–6	3–1	1–1	1–4	1–3	1–1	3–3	0–1	3–3	5–0		2–0
SSV Rhade	0–1	3–1	0–7	0–3	0–0	0–2	2–2	3–0	1–8	1–0	0–3	4–0	1–3	

Source: Fussball.de
Legend: Blue = home team win; Yellow = draw; Red = away team win.

=== Top scorers ===
Rank	Player	Club	Goals
1	(Germany) Alisa Sinani	Bayer Leverkusen II	27
2	(Germany) Antonia Langshausen	1. FC Köln II	25
3	(Germany) Rita Schumacher	Borussia Dortmund	23
4	(Germany) Jocelyn Hampel	Arminia Bielefeld	22
5	(Germany) Ronja Leubner	Borussia Dortmund	18
6	(Germany) Louisa Müggenburg	SGS Essen II	16
7	(Germany) Emily Tichelkamp	1. FC Köln II	15
8	(Germany) Dana Marquardt	Borussia Dortmund	14
9	(Germany) Annika Enderle	Borussia Dortmund	13
10	(Germany) Olesja Arslan	1. FC Köln II	11

== 2. Bundesliga promotion playoffs ==
13 June 2026
13:00 UTC+2

1. FC Saarbrücken	1–4	Hertha BSC
Martin 72'	Report	Wellhausen 3'; Seifert 7'; Poock 46'; Saeland 75'

Ludwigsparkstadion, Saarbrücken
Attendance: 3,924
Referee: Sina Gieringer
21 June 2026
14:00 UTC+2

Hertha BSC	v	1. FC Saarbrücken

Stadion auf dem Wurfplatz, Berlin

14 June 2026
12:00 UTC+2

1. FC Köln II	4–0	Holstein Kiel
Tichelkamp 21', 26', 86'; Palm 70'	Report

Kunstrasenplatz am Geißbockheim, Cologne
Attendance: 650
Referee: Naemi Bremer
20 June 2026
12:00 UTC+2

Holstein Kiel	0–0	1. FC Köln II
	Report

Waldwiese, Kiel
Attendance: 880
Referee: Celina Sophie Böhm

1. FC Köln II won 4–0 on aggregate and is promoted to 2026–27 2. Frauen-Bundesliga
