= 2018 SheBelieves Cup squads =

List of players competing at the 3rd edition of the SheBelieves Cup

This article lists the squads for the 2018 SheBelieves Cup, the 3rd edition of the SheBelieves Cup. The cup consisted of a series of friendly games, and was held in the United States from 1 to 7 March 2018. The four national teams involved in the tournament registered a squad of 23 players.

The age listed for each player is on 1 March 2018, the first day of the tournament. The club listed is the club for which the player last played a competitive match prior to the tournament. The nationality for each club reflects the national association (not the league) to which the club is affiliated. A flag is included for coaches that are of a different nationality than their own national team.

== Squads ==
=== England ===
Coach: Phil Neville

The final squad was announced on 20 February 2018. On 24 February 2018, Steph Houghton, Karen Carney, and Jordan Nobbs withdrew due to injuries and were replaced by Rachel Daly, Abbie McManus, and Georgia Stanway.

No.	Pos.	Player	Date of birth (age)	Caps	Goals	Club
1	GK	Karen Bardsley	14 October 1984 (aged 33)			(The Football Association) Manchester City
2	DF	Lucy Bronze (captain)	28 October 1991 (aged 26)			(French Football Federation) Lyon
3	DF	Demi Stokes	12 December 1991 (aged 26)			(The Football Association) Manchester City
4	MF	Fara Williams	25 January 1984 (aged 34)			(The Football Association) Reading
5	DF	Anita Asante	27 April 1985 (aged 32)			(The Football Association) Chelsea
6	DF	Millie Bright	21 August 1993 (aged 24)			(The Football Association) Chelsea
7	FW	Nikita Parris	10 March 1994 (aged 23)			(The Football Association) Manchester City
8	MF	Jill Scott	2 February 1987 (aged 31)			(The Football Association) Manchester City
9	FW	Jodie Taylor	17 May 1986 (aged 31)			(Football Australia) Melbourne City
10	FW	Fran Kirby	29 June 1993 (aged 24)			(The Football Association) Chelsea
11	FW	Toni Duggan	25 July 1991 (aged 26)			(Royal Spanish Football Federation) Barcelona
12	DF	Hannah Blundell	25 May 1994 (aged 23)			(The Football Association) Chelsea
13	GK	Siobhan Chamberlain	15 August 1983 (aged 34)			(The Football Association) Liverpool
14	DF	Alex Greenwood	7 September 1993 (aged 24)			(The Football Association) Liverpool
15	DF	Abbie McManus	14 January 1993 (aged 25)			(The Football Association) Manchester City
16	MF	Izzy Christiansen	20 September 1991 (aged 26)			(The Football Association) Manchester City
17	DF	Rachel Daly	6 December 1991 (aged 26)			(United States Soccer Federation) Houston Dash
18	FW	Ellen White	9 May 1989 (aged 28)			(The Football Association) Birmingham City
19	FW	Melissa Lawley	28 April 1994 (aged 23)			(The Football Association) Manchester City
20	FW	Georgia Stanway	3 January 1999 (aged 19)			(The Football Association) Manchester City
21	GK	Carly Telford	7 July 1987 (aged 30)			(The Football Association) Chelsea
22	MF	Keira Walsh	8 April 1997 (aged 20)			(The Football Association) Manchester City
23	DF	Gabrielle George	2 February 1997 (aged 21)			(The Football Association) Everton

=== France ===
Coach: Corinne Diacre

The final squad was announced on 20 February 2018.

No.	Pos.	Player	Date of birth (age)	Caps	Goals	Club
1	GK	Karima Benameur	13 April 1989 (aged 28)			(French Football Federation) Paris FC
2	DF	Aïssatou Tounkara	16 March 1995 (aged 22)			(French Football Federation) Paris FC
3	DF	Ève Périsset	24 December 1994 (aged 23)			(French Football Federation) Paris Saint-Germain
4	DF	Laura Georges	20 August 1984 (aged 33)			(German Football Association) Bayern Munich
5	DF	Estelle Cascarino	5 February 1997 (aged 21)			(French Football Federation) Paris FC
6	MF	Amandine Henry (captain)	28 September 1989 (aged 28)			(French Football Federation) Lyon
7	DF	Amel Majri	25 January 1993 (aged 25)			(French Football Federation) Lyon
8	MF	Maéva Clemaron	10 November 1992 (aged 25)			(French Football Federation) Fleury
9	FW	Eugénie Le Sommer	18 May 1989 (aged 28)			(French Football Federation) Lyon
10	MF	Aminata Diallo	3 April 1995 (aged 22)			(French Football Federation) Paris Saint-Germain
11	FW	Ouleymata Sarr	8 October 1995 (aged 22)			(French Football Federation) Lille
12	MF	Gaëtane Thiney	28 October 1985 (aged 32)			(French Football Federation) Paris FC
13	FW	Valérie Gauvin	1 June 1996 (aged 21)			(French Football Federation) Montpellier
14	FW	Faustine Robert	18 May 1994 (aged 23)			(French Football Federation) Guingamp
15	FW	Marie-Charlotte Léger	13 March 1996 (aged 21)			(French Football Federation) Montpellier
16	GK	Sarah Bouhaddi	17 October 1986 (aged 31)			(French Football Federation) Lyon
17	DF	Marion Torrent	17 April 1992 (aged 25)			(French Football Federation) Montpellier
18	FW	Viviane Asseyi	20 November 1993 (aged 24)			(French Football Federation) Marseille
19	DF	Griedge Mbock Bathy	26 February 1995 (aged 23)			(French Football Federation) Lyon
20	MF	Kadidiatou Diani	1 April 1995 (aged 22)			(French Football Federation) Paris Saint-Germain
21	GK	Solène Durand	20 November 1994 (aged 23)			(French Football Federation) Guingamp
22	DF	Sakina Karchaoui	26 January 1996 (aged 22)			(French Football Federation) Montpellier
23	MF	Grace Geyoro	2 July 1997 (aged 20)			(French Football Federation) Paris Saint-Germain

=== Germany ===
Coach: Steffi Jones

The final squad was announced on 12 February 2018.

No.	Pos.	Player	Date of birth (age)	Caps	Goals	Club
1	GK	Almuth Schult	9 February 1991 (aged 27)			(German Football Association) VfL Wolfsburg
2	DF	Johanna Elsig	1 November 1992 (aged 25)			(German Football Association) Turbine Potsdam
3	DF	Kathrin Hendrich	6 April 1992 (aged 25)			(German Football Association) 1. FFC Frankfurt
4	DF	Leonie Maier	29 September 1992 (aged 25)			(German Football Association) Bayern Munich
5	DF	Babett Peter	12 May 1988 (aged 29)			(German Football Association) VfL Wolfsburg
7	DF	Jacqueline Klasen	4 February 1994 (aged 24)			(German Football Association) SGS Essen
8	MF	Lena Goeßling	8 March 1986 (aged 31)			(German Football Association) VfL Wolfsburg
9	FW	Mandy Islacker	8 August 1988 (aged 29)			(German Football Association) Bayern Munich
10	MF	Dzsenifer Marozsán	18 April 1992 (aged 25)			(French Football Federation) Lyon
11	FW	Alexandra Popp	6 April 1991 (aged 26)			(German Football Association) VfL Wolfsburg
12	GK	Laura Benkarth	14 October 1992 (aged 25)			(German Football Association) SC Freiburg
13	MF	Sara Däbritz	15 February 1995 (aged 23)			(German Football Association) Bayern Munich
14	DF	Anna Blässe	27 February 1987 (aged 31)			(German Football Association) VfL Wolfsburg
15	DF	Sara Doorsoun	17 November 1991 (aged 26)			(German Football Association) SGS Essen
16	MF	Linda Dallmann	2 September 1994 (aged 23)			(German Football Association) SGS Essen
17	DF	Verena Faißt	22 May 1989 (aged 28)			(German Football Association) Bayern Munich
19	FW	Svenja Huth	25 January 1991 (aged 27)			(German Football Association) Turbine Potsdam
20	MF	Lina Magull	15 August 1994 (aged 23)			(German Football Association) SC Freiburg
21	GK	Carina Schlüter	8 November 1996 (aged 21)			(German Football Association) SC Sand
22	MF	Tabea Kemme	14 December 1991 (aged 26)			(German Football Association) Turbine Potsdam
23	FW	Hasret Kayikçi	6 November 1991 (aged 26)			(German Football Association) SC Freiburg
26	MF	Sharon Beck	22 March 1995 (aged 22)	0	0	(German Football Association) 1899 Hoffenheim
27	FW	Lea Schüller	12 November 1997 (aged 20)			(German Football Association) SGS Essen

=== United States ===
Coach: Jill Ellis

The final squad was announced on 23 February 2018.

No.	Pos.	Player	Date of birth (age)	Caps	Goals	Club
1	GK	Alyssa Naeher	April 20, 1988 (aged 29)	24	0	(United States Soccer Federation) Chicago Red Stars
2	DF	Casey Short	August 23, 1990 (aged 27)	19	0	(United States Soccer Federation) Chicago Red Stars
3	MF	Andi Sullivan	December 20, 1995 (aged 22)	8	0	(United States Soccer Federation) Washington Spirit
5	DF	Kelley O'Hara	August 4, 1988 (aged 29)	105	2	(United States Soccer Federation) Utah Royals
6	MF	Morgan Brian	February 26, 1993 (aged 25)	69	6	(French Football Federation) Lyon
7	DF	Abby Dahlkemper	May 13, 1993 (aged 24)	14	0	(United States Soccer Federation) North Carolina Courage
8	MF	Julie Ertz	April 6, 1992 (aged 25)	58	15	(United States Soccer Federation) Chicago Red Stars
9	MF	Lindsey Horan	May 26, 1994 (aged 23)	44	4	(United States Soccer Federation) Portland Thorns
10	MF	Carli Lloyd (captain)	July 16, 1982 (aged 35)	247	98	(United States Soccer Federation) Sky Blue
11	FW	Mallory Pugh	April 29, 1998 (aged 19)	30	8	(United States Soccer Federation) Washington Spirit
12	FW	Lynn Williams	May 21, 1993 (aged 24)	16	4	(United States Soccer Federation) North Carolina Courage
13	FW	Alex Morgan	July 2, 1989 (aged 28)	135	81	(United States Soccer Federation) Orlando Pride
14	DF	Sofia Huerta	December 14, 1992 (aged 25)	3	0	(United States Soccer Federation) Chicago Red Stars
15	FW	Megan Rapinoe	July 5, 1985 (aged 32)	130	34	(United States Soccer Federation) Seattle Reign
16	DF	Emily Sonnett	November 25, 1993 (aged 24)	13	0	(United States Soccer Federation) Portland Thorns
17	DF	Tierna Davidson	November 19, 1998 (aged 19)	1	0	(United States Soccer Federation) Stanford Cardinal
18	GK	Jane Campbell	February 17, 1995 (aged 23)	2	0	(United States Soccer Federation) Houston Dash
19	FW	Crystal Dunn	July 3, 1992 (aged 25)	58	23	(United States Soccer Federation) North Carolina Courage
20	MF	Allie Long	August 13, 1987 (aged 30)	33	6	(United States Soccer Federation) Seattle Reign
21	FW	Savannah McCaskill	July 31, 1996 (aged 21)	1	0	(United States Soccer Federation) Sky Blue
22	DF	Taylor Smith	December 1, 1993 (aged 24)	8	0	(United States Soccer Federation) Washington Spirit
23	FW	Christen Press	December 29, 1988 (aged 29)	97	44	(United States Soccer Federation) Houston Dash
24	GK	Ashlyn Harris	October 19, 1985 (aged 32)	14	0	(United States Soccer Federation) Orlando Pride

== Player representation ==
=== By club ===
Clubs with 3 or more players represented are listed.

Players	Club
9	(England) Manchester City
8	(France) Lyon
5	(England) Chelsea, (Germany) Bayern Munich, (Germany) VfL Wolfsburg
4	(France) Montpellier, (France) Paris FC, (France) Paris Saint-Germain, (Germany) Essen, (United States) Chicago Red Stars
3	(Germany) Freiburg, (Germany) Turbine Potsdam, (United States) Houston Dash, (United States) North Carolina Courage, (United States) Washington Spirit

=== By club nationality ===
Players	Clubs
25	France
23	Germany, United States
19	England
1	Australia, Spain

=== By club federation ===
Players	Federation
68	UEFA
23	CONCACAF
1	AFC

=== By representatives of domestic league ===
National squad	Players
France	22
Germany	22
United States	22
England	19
