= Carina Schlüter =

German footballer

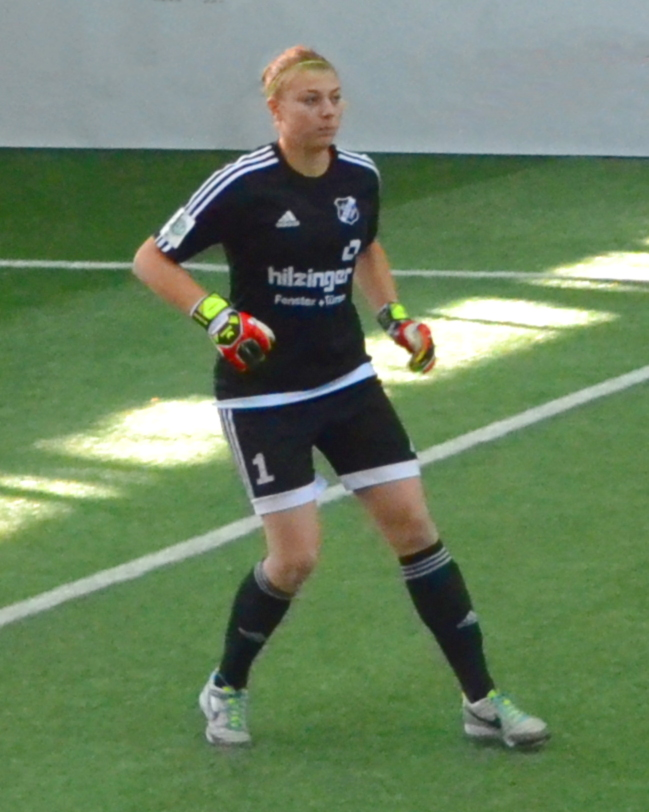
- Schlüter with SC Sand in 2017

Personal information
- Full name: Carina Schlüter
- Date of birth: 8 November 1996 (age 29)
- Place of birth: Minden, Germany
- Height: 1.75 m (5 ft 9 in)
- Position: Goalkeeper

Team information
- Current team: SKN St. Pölten
- Number: 33

Youth career
- 2001–2011: SV Weser Leteln
- 2011–2013: Arminia Bielefeld

Senior career*
Years	Team	Apps	(Gls)
2013	Arminia Bielefeld	13	(0)
2014–2015	VfL Bochum	23	(0)
2015–2016	Herforder SV	20	(0)
2016–2019	SC Sand	62	(0)
2019–2021	Bayern Munich	5	(0)
2021–2022	RB Leipzig	8	(0)
2022–	SKN St. Pölten	69	(0)

International career^{‡}
2011	Germany U-16	1	(0)
2014–2015	Germany U-19	5	(0)
2015–2016	Germany U-20	7	(0)
2018–	Germany	1	(0)
- * Club domestic league appearances and goals as of 1 August 2019 ‡ National team caps and goals as of 11 June 2018

Carina Schlüter (born 8 November 1996) is a German footballer who plays as a goalkeeper for SKN St. Pölten. She represented the German national football in 2018.

== Career ==
=== Statistics ===
As of 1 August 2019

Club	Season	League			Cup		Continental		Total	
Club	Season	Division	Apps	Goals	Apps	Goals	Apps	Goals	Apps	Goals
Arminia Bielefeld	2013–14	Verbandsliga Westfalen	13	0	—		—		13	0
Arminia Bielefeld	Total		13	0	0	0	0	0	13	0
VfL Bochum	2013–14	2. Bundesliga	8	0	1	0	—		9	0
VfL Bochum	2014–15	2. Bundesliga	15	0	0	0	—		15	0
VfL Bochum	Total		23	0	1	0	0	0	24	0
Herforder SV	2015–16	2. Bundesliga	20	0	3	0	—		23	0
Herforder SV	Total		20	0	3	0	0	0	23	0
SC Sand	2016–17	Bundesliga	18	0	6	0	—		24	0
SC Sand	2017–18	Bundesliga	22	0	3	0	—		25	0
SC Sand	2018–19	Bundesliga	22	0	1	0	—		23	0
SC Sand	Total		62	0	10	0	0	0	72	0
FC Bayern Munich	2019–20	Bundesliga	0	0	0	0	0	0	0	0
FC Bayern Munich	Total		0	0	0	0	0	0	0	0
Career total			118	0	14	0	0	0	132	0
