= 2015–16 2. Frauen-Bundesliga =

German women's football league season

2. Bundesliga (women)
- Season: 2015–16
- Champions: MSV Duisburg (North); TSG 1899 Hoffenheim II (South)
- Promoted: MSV Duisburg (North); Borussia Mönchengladbach (South)
- Relegated: Alemannia Aachen; FFV Leipzig; ETSV Würzburg; Holstein Kiel; Blau-Weiß Hohen Neuendorf
- Matches: 266
- Goals: 952 (3.58 per match)
- Top goalscorer: Giustina Ronzetti (23 goals)
- Biggest home win: BV Cloppenburg 11–2 FFV Leipzig (15 May 2016)
- Biggest away win: TSG 1899 Hoffenheim II 9–0 1. FC Saarbrücken (8 May 2016)
- Highest scoring: BV Cloppenburg 11–2 FFV Leipzig (15 May 2016)

The 2015–16 season of the 2. Bundesliga (women) was the twelfth season of Germany's second-tier women's football league. This season started on 30 August 2015.

== Changes ==
VfL Bochum did not apply for this season's license due to financial problems, thus automatically relegating them back to the Regionalliga. SV Henstedt-Ulzburg was promoted from the Regionalliga Nord and played in the north group. Borussia Mönchengladbach was promoted from the Regionalliga West. TSV Schott Mainz was promoted from the Regionalliga Südwest. Eintracht Wetzlar was promoted from the Regionalliga Süd. Blau-Weiß Hohen Neuendorf was promoted from the Regionalliga Nordost.

== North ==
Pos	Team	Pld	W	D	L	GF	GA	GD	Pts	Qualification or relegation
1	MSV Duisburg (C, P)	22	22	0	0	75	14	+61	66	Promotion to 2016–17 Bundesliga
2	BV Cloppenburg	22	16	1	5	61	25	+36	49	
3	FSV Gütersloh 2009	22	13	4	5	53	30	+23	43	
4	Herforder SV Borussia Friedenstal	22	11	4	7	57	41	+16	37	
5	1. FC Lübars	22	11	3	8	49	29	+20	36	
6	SV Meppen	22	10	5	7	35	27	+8	35	
7	Turbine Potsdam II	22	9	4	9	55	40	+15	31	
8	VfL Wolfsburg II	22	7	7	8	28	28	0	28	
9	SV Henstedt-Ulzburg	22	6	3	13	38	58	−20	21	
10	Blau-Weiß Hohen Neuendorf (R)	22	2	6	14	20	50	−30	12	Qualification for the relegation play-off
11	FFV Leipzig (R)	22	3	3	16	18	88	−70	12	Relegation to 2016–17 Regionalliga
12	Holstein Kiel (R)	22	1	2	19	19	78	−59	5	Relegation to 2016–17 Regionalliga

Source: DFB
Rules for classification: 1) Points; 2) Goal difference; 3) Goals scored
(C) Champions; (P) Promoted; (R) Relegated

=== Results ===
Home \ Away	DUI	HER	HOH	BVC	GÜT	KIE	LEI	LÜB	HEN	MEP	POT	WOL
MSV Duisburg		3–1	2–1	2–0	3–0	6–1	4–0	2–1	5–2	2–0	2–0	2–0
Herforder SV	1–6		2–1	1–2	1–2	3–0	4–0	3–3	5–0	1–2	2–2	0–0
BW Hohen Neuendorf	2–7	1–4		0–6	1–1	2–1	1–1	0–1	1–1	0–1	1–1	2–3
BV Cloppenburg	0–1	3–2	4–0		3–1	3–1	11–2	2–1	4–1	0–3	2–0	2–0
FSV Gütersloh 2009	1–3	1–1	1–0	2–1		5–1	0–0	1–2	3–0	1–0	4–3	3–1
Holstein Kiel	0–4	2–4	2–1	0–7	1–3		1–2	0–2	1–5	0–0	1–6	1–3
FFV Leipzig	0–4	1–4	1–0	2–3	1–8	2–0		0–8	0–2	2–2	3–7	0–3
1. FC Lübars	2–3	2–3	4–0	1–2	2–1	6–4	5–0		4–0	1–0	4–1	0–0
SV Henstedt-Ulzburg	0–2	5–6	3–1	0–1	2–5	2–2	6–1	2–0		1–1	0–5	1–3
SV Meppen	0–4	1–4	2–2	2–2	1–3	4–0	7–0	1–0	2–1		0–2	2–1
Turbine Potsdam II	1–3	2–4	2–3	2–1	2–6	5–0	4–0	4–0	5–1	0–2		1–1
VfL Wolfsburg II	1–5	2–1	0–0	1–2	1–1	3–0	4–0	0–0	1–3	0–2	0–0	

Updated to match(es) played on 15 May 2016. Source: DFB
Legend: Blue = home team win; Yellow = draw; Red = away team win.

== South ==
Pos	Team	Pld	W	D	L	GF	GA	GD	Pts	Qualification or relegation
1	TSG 1899 Hoffenheim II (C)	22	18	4	0	61	12	+49	58	
2	Borussia Mönchengladbach (P)	22	16	2	4	54	22	+32	50	Promotion to 2016–17 Bundesliga
3	Bayern Munich II	22	13	4	5	49	28	+21	43	
4	1. FC Saarbrücken	22	12	7	3	40	29	+11	43	
5	TSV Schott Mainz	22	9	6	7	26	25	+1	33	
6	TSV Crailsheim	22	8	5	9	39	50	−11	29	
7	FFC Frankfurt II	22	7	5	10	32	36	−4	26	
8	VfL Sindelfingen	22	8	2	12	28	44	−16	26	
9	FSV Hessen Wetzlar	22	7	3	12	30	28	+2	24	
10	SV 67 Weinberg	22	5	3	14	29	43	−14	18	Qualification for the relegation play-off
11	ETSV Würzburg (R)	22	3	4	15	21	58	−37	13	Relegation to 2016–17 Regionalliga
12	Alemannia Aachen (R)	22	2	3	17	21	55	−34	9	Relegation to 2016–17 Regionalliga

Source: DFB
Rules for classification: 1) Points; 2) Goal difference; 3) Goals scored
(C) Champions; (P) Promoted; (R) Relegated

=== Results ===
Home \ Away	AAC	CRA	FRA	HOF	MAI	WET	BAY	MÖN	SAA	SIN	WEI	WÜR
Alemannia Aachen		1–2	0–0	1–3	0–2	1–5	0–2	1–4	1–2	0–3	3–1	1–1
TSV Crailsheim	1–0		2–2	2–5	1–1	1–0	3–6	3–4	0–0	4–0	1–5	2–0
FFC Frankfurt II	2–1	2–2		0–1	1–2	1–0	2–1	1–5	1–3	0–1	2–2	5–1
TSG 1899 Hoffenheim II	2–1	3–0	4–1		0–0	1–0	3–1	3–1	1–1	2–1	1–1	2–1
TSV Schott Mainz	3–1	3–2	0–0	0–0		1–0	0–1	1–1	0–2	0–2	2–1	4–1
FSV Hessen Wetzlar	5–2	5–1	0–2	0–2	1–1		0–1	0–3	2–3	2–0	2–0	4–2
Bayern Munich II	3–1	2–2	3–2	1–4	1–0	0–0		4–0	2–3	5–1	3–0	4–1
Borussia Mönchengladbach	4–0	4–1	3–0	0–3	4–0	3–1	1–2		1–1	3–1	1–0	3–0
1. FC Saarbrücken	3–0	3–1	1–0	0–9	3–0	2–1	1–1	0–1		1–2	5–1	2–2
VfL Sindelfingen	2–4	2–4	4–3	0–3	2–0	1–0	1–1	0–3	3–3		1–2	1–0
SV 67 Weinberg	1–1	1–2	0–2	0–4	1–3	0–2	3–1	0–1	0–1	2–0		5–1
ETSV Würzburg	4–1	1–2	0–3	0–5	0–3	0–0	0–4	0–4	0–0	2–0	4–3	

Updated to match(es) played on 15 May 2016. Source: DFB
Legend: Blue = home team win; Yellow = draw; Red = away team win.

== Relegation play-offs ==
=== First leg ===
22 May 2016
11:00

SV 67 Weinberg	7–1	Blau-Weiß Hohen Neuendorf
Hofmann 36'; Heisel 38', 55', 58'; Rößler 62'; Kömm 74', 87'	Report	Laue 65'

Sportanlage Leutershausen Am Lindenhain
Attendance: 374
Referee: Karoline Wacker

=== Second leg ===
29 May 2016
11:00

Blau-Weiß Hohen Neuendorf	3–3	SV 67 Weinberg
Pożerska 32', 42'; Kollek 45+1'	Report	Hopfengärtner 25'; Kömm 56', 62'

Niederheide NR1
Attendance: 260
Referee: Daniela Illing

== Top scorers ==
As of 15 May 2016.

Rank	Player	Club	Goals
1	(Germany) Giustina Ronzetti	Herforder SV	23
2	(Germany) Sofia Nati	MSV Duisburg	22
3	(Poland) Agnieszka Winczo	BV Cloppenburg	17
4	(Germany) Nadja Pfeiffer	Borussia Mönchengladbach	16
5	(Germany) Alina Witt	SV Henstedt-Ulzburg	15
6	(Germany) Sarah Grünheid	FSV Gütersloh 2009	14
7	(Germany) Stefanie Weichelt	MSV Duisburg	13
7	(Germany) Madeleine Wojtecki	1. FC Lübars	13
7	(Germany) Julia Matuschewski	FFC Frankfurt II	13
7	(Germany) Luisa Scheidel	TSV Crailsheim	13
