= 2013–14 2. Frauen-Bundesliga =

2. Bundesliga (women)
- Season: 2013–14
- Champions: FFC Turbine Potsdam II (North); SC Sand (South)
- Promoted: Herforder SV; SC Sand
- Relegated: SC 07 Bad Neuenahr; TuS Wörrstadt; FF USV Jena II; FC Viktoria 1889 Berlin; Blau-Weiß Hohen Neuendorf
- Matches: 266
- Goals: 962 (3.62 per match)
- Top goalscorer: Ilaria Mauro & Sarah Schatton (24 goals)
- Biggest home win: Niederkirchen 9–2 TuS Wörrstadt (27 April 2014); Saarbrücken 9–2 Niederkirchen (25 May 2014)
- Biggest away win: TuS Wörrstadt 0–8 1. FC Köln (8 September 2013)
- Highest scoring: Niederkirchen 9–2 TuS Wörrstadt (27 April 2014); Saarbrücken 9–2 Niederkirchen (25 May 2014)

The 2013–14 season of the Women's 2. Bundesliga was the tenth season of Germany's second-tier women's football league.

== Changes ==
In June 2013, 1. FC Lok Leipzig decided to remove the women's team from being a part of the club and the new women's team played under the name of FFV Leipzig.

== North ==
=== League table ===
Pos	Team	Pld	W	D	L	GF	GA	GD	Pts	Qualification or relegation
1	Turbine Potsdam II (C)	22	16	3	3	62	26	+36	51	
2	Herforder SV (P)	22	14	5	3	54	18	+36	47	Promotion to 2014–15 Bundesliga (Note: Turbine Potsdam II were not eligible for promotion to the Bundesliga, so Herforder SV were promoted.)
3	Werder Bremen	22	11	1	10	60	38	+22	34	
4	SV Meppen	22	10	4	8	36	32	+4	34	
5	FSV Gütersloh 2009	22	9	6	7	43	38	+5	33	
6	VfL Wolfsburg II	22	9	5	8	29	27	+2	32	
7	1. FC Lübars	22	7	5	10	34	32	+2	26	
8	Magdeburger FFC	22	6	8	8	30	42	−12	26	
9	FFV Leipzig	22	7	4	11	37	51	−14	25	
10	Blau-Weiß Hohen Neuendorf (R)	22	7	4	11	24	54	−30	25	Qualification for the relegation play-off
11	FF USV Jena II (R)	22	7	1	14	24	49	−25	22	Relegation to 2014–15 Regionalliga
12	FC Viktoria 1889 Berlin (R)	22	3	6	13	14	40	−26	15	Relegation to 2014–15 Regionalliga

Updated to match(es) played on 1 June 2014. Source: Soccerway
Rules for classification: 1) points; 2) goal difference; 3) number of goals scored.
(C) Champions; (P) Promoted; (R) Relegated

=== Results ===
Home \ Away	BRE	GÜT	HER	JEN	LEI	LÜB	MAG	MEP	NEU	POT	VIK	WOL
Werder Bremen		4–2	1–1	3–0	7–2	0–1	5–0	6–2	7–1	1–2	3–1	2–1
FSV Gütersloh 2009	4–2		0–4	3–0	5–0	0–0	2–1	1–1	2–1	1–1	2–2	0–1
Herforder SV	2–1	3–0		6–0	4–0	1–1	3–3	3–2	3–0	2–1	2–2	1–2
USV Jena II	1–3	1–2	0–2		2–3	0–3	0–0	0–2	4–1	1–4	2–0	1–0
FFV Leipzig	2–0	6–2	0–4	1–4		2–1	1–1	0–1	2–3	1–1	3–0	3–1
1. FC Lübars	2–0	1–2	0–4	6–0	3–3		4–1	0–0	0–2	2–3	2–0	0–1
Magdeburger FFC	1–5	2–1	0–0	1–3	2–1	3–1		1–1	5–1	1–4	4–0	0–3
SV Meppen	1–0	2–4	0–2	1–0	4–2	3–1	0–1		1–2	4–3	1–0	0–0
Blau-Weiß Hohen Neuendorf	4–1	0–7	0–3	3–2	1–1	1–4	1–1	0–5		0–3	1–0	1–1
Turbine Potsdam II	3–2	5–2	3–0	5–0	3–0	4–1	4–0	2–1	0–0		0–2	3–2
Viktoria 1889 Berlin	0–4	0–0	1–4	0–2	2–1	0–0	1–1	0–2	0–1	2–5		1–0
VfL Wolfsburg II	5–3	1–1	1–0	0–1	0–3	2–1	1–1	4–2	2–0	1–3	0–0	

Legend: Blue = home team win; Yellow = draw; Red = away team win.

Updated to games played on 1 June 2014

== South ==
=== League table ===
Pos	Team	Pld	W	D	L	GF	GA	GD	Pts	Qualification or relegation
1	SC Sand (C)	22	21	1	0	89	12	+77	64	Promotion to 2014–15 Bundesliga
2	1. FC Köln	22	17	2	3	67	22	+45	53	
3	1. FC Saarbrücken	22	14	2	6	57	24	+33	44	
4	FFC Frankfurt II	22	12	1	9	42	36	+6	37	
5	TSV Crailsheim	22	11	3	8	46	39	+7	36	
6	VfL Bochum	22	10	3	9	37	29	+8	33	
7	1. FFC 08 Niederkirchen	22	9	3	10	47	51	−4	30	
8	Bayern Munich II	22	7	7	8	31	30	+1	28	
9	SV 67 Weinberg	22	8	2	12	45	48	−3	26	
10	ETSV Würzburg	22	5	5	12	27	51	−24	20	Qualification for the relegation play-off
11	SC 07 Bad Neuenahr (R)	22	1	3	18	14	68	−54	6	Relegation to 2014–15 Regionalliga
12	TuS Wörrstadt (R)	22	0	2	20	5	97	−92	2	Relegation to 2014–15 Regionalliga

Updated to match(es) played on 1 June 2014. Source: Soccerway
Rules for classification: 1) points; 2) goal difference; 3) number of goals scored.
(C) Champions; (R) Relegated

=== Results ===
Home \ Away	BAD	BAY	BOC	CRA	FRA	KÖL	NIE	SAA	SAN	WEI	WÖR	WÜR
SC 07 Bad Neuenahr		0–2	0–3	1–3	0–3	1–3	0–3	1–3	0–5	0–2	1–1	1–2
Bayern Munich II	5–0		0–0	0–0	1–2	0–4	0–3	1–0	1–5	3–1	6–0	4–0
VfL Bochum	3–2	1–2		3–2	0–1	1–2	1–0	1–0	1–2	1–0	4–1	1–0
TSV Crailsheim	6–2	1–1	1–1		0–4	2–1	4–2	3–0	1–5	2–4	3–0	2–1
FFC Frankfurt II	3–1	2–0	2–1	0–2		0–4	1–3	1–3	1–2	2–1	3–0	5–2
1. FC Köln	3–0	2–0	2–1	6–0	1–0		3–0	1–1	1–2	4–2	4–0	7–1
1. FFC 08 Niederkirchen	2–2	2–2	2–1	0–2	4–1	3–3		1–2	0–3	2–4	9–2	2–1
1. FC Saarbrücken	5–0	2–0	5–1	2–1	3–1	1–2	9–2		0–2	3–1	4–0	0–0
SC Sand	7–1	2–0	3–1	3–0	5–1	4–1	4–0	3–0		4–2	7–0	3–0
SV 67 Weinberg	0–0	1–1	1–6	2–1	0–3	2–3	5–0	2–6	0–5		7–0	1–2
TuS Wörrstadt	0–1	0–0	0–4	0–5	0–3	0–8	1–5	0–1	0–12	0–5		0–4
ETSV Würzburg	4–0	2–2	1–1	1–5	3–3	1–2	0–2	0–7	1–1	0–2	1–0	

Legend: Blue = home team win; Yellow = draw; Red = away team win.

Updated to games played on 1 June 2014

== Relegation play-offs ==
Blau-Weiß Hohen Neuendorf, who finished 10th in the South division, and ETSV Würzburg, who finished 10th in the North division, will participate in a two-legged tie. The loser on aggregate score after both matches will be relegated to the Regionalliga.

=== First leg ===
9 June 2014
14:00 CEST

ETSV Würzburg	4–3	Blau-Weiß Hohen Neuendorf
Desic 43'; Kreußer 47' (pen.); Damm 56'; Rödig 80'	Report	Laue 30'; Konsek 69'; Siwinska 75'

Sportpark Herieden, Würzburg
Attendance: 743
Referee: Moiken Wolk

=== Second leg ===
15 June 2014
14:00 CEST

Blau-Weiß Hohen Neuendorf	1–1	ETSV Würzburg
Zlidnis 39'	Report	Damm 90+1'

Sportplatz An der Niederheide, Hohen Neuendorf
Attendance: 680
Referee: Sandra Blumenthal

ETSV Würzburg win 5–4 on aggregate

== Top scorers ==
Rank	Scorer	Club	Goals
1	(Italy) Ilaria Mauro	SC Sand	24
1	(Germany) Sarah Schatton	1. FC Saarbrücken	24
3	(Germany) Inka Grings	1. FC Köln	23
4	(Germany) Cindy König	Werder Bremen	17
5	(Germany) Nina Heisel	SV Weinberg	16
6	(Switzerland) Isabelle Meyer	SC Sand	15
6	(Germany) Mandana Knopf	1. FC Köln	15
8	(Germany) Jacqueline de Backer	1. FC Saarbrücken	14
8	(Germany) Kirsten Nesse	Herforder SV	14
