= Almuth Schult =

German footballer (born 1991)

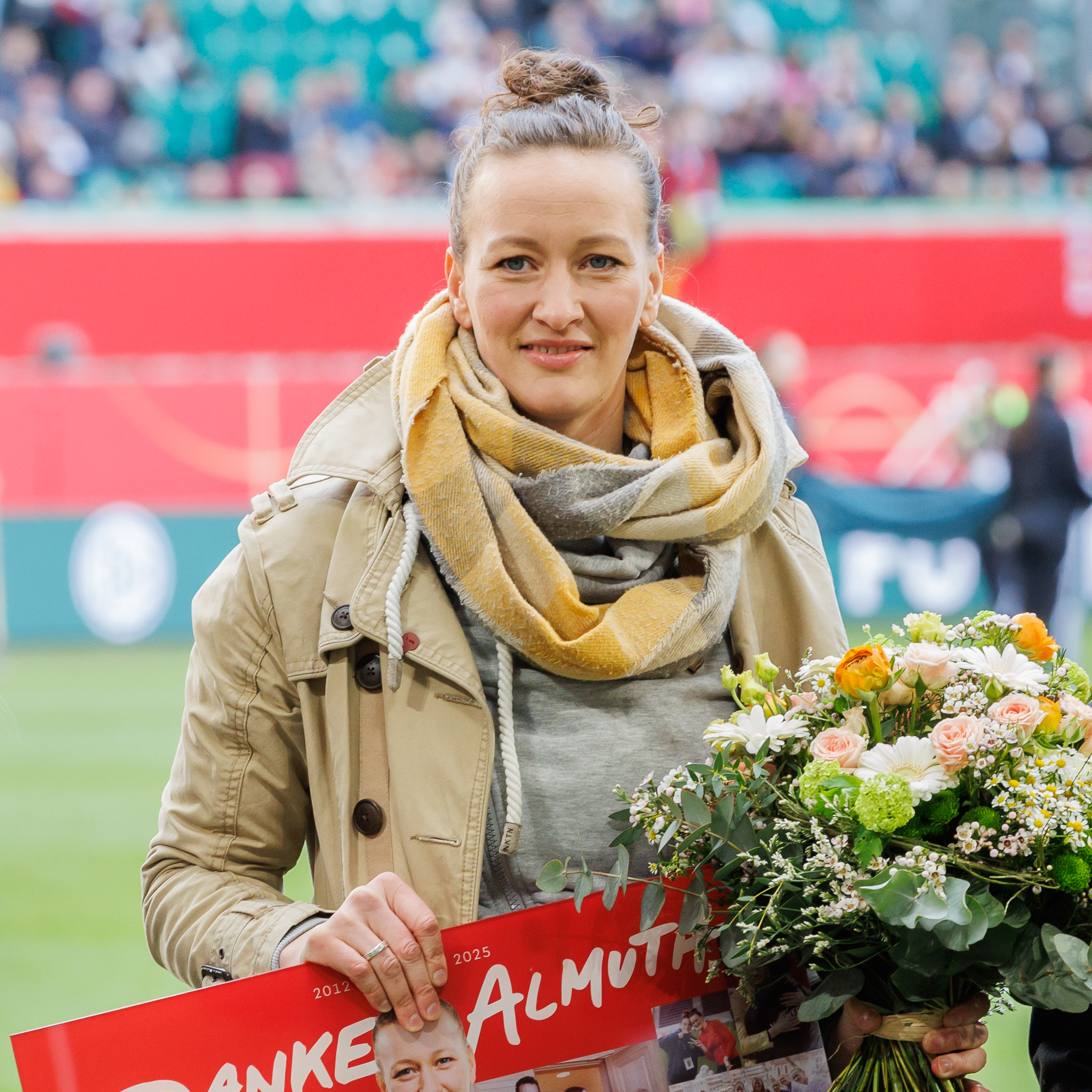
- Schult in 2025

Personal information
- Full name: Almuth Schult
- Date of birth: 9 February 1991 (age 35)
- Place of birth: Dannenberg, Germany
- Height: 1.80 m (5 ft 11 in)
- Position: Goalkeeper

Youth career
- 1996–2007: FC SG Gartow
- 2007–2008: Hamburger SV

Senior career*
Years	Team	Apps	(Gls)
2007–2008	Hamburger SV	0	(0)
2008–2011	Magdeburger FFC	44	(0)
2011–2013	SC 07 Bad Neuenahr	43	(0)
2013–2022	VfL Wolfsburg	116	(0)
2022	Angel City FC	1	(0)
2024	Hamburger SV	4	(0)
2024	Kansas City Current	9	(0)

International career
2008–2009	Germany U19	11	(0)
2009–2010	Germany U20	10	(0)
2010	Germany U23	1	(0)
2011–2022	Germany	66	(0)
Medal record
Women's football
Representing Germany
Olympic Games
Gold medal – first place	2016 Rio de Janeiro	Team
UEFA Women's Championship
Gold medal – first place	2013 Sweden
Silver medal – second place	2022 England
- * Club domestic league appearances and goals

Almuth Schult (German pronunciation: [ˈʔalmuːt ˈʃʊlt]; born 9 February 1991) is a German former footballer who played as a goalkeeper and was a member of the Germany national team.

She announced her retirement in March 2025.

== Club career ==
At the age of five, Schult began her career at her local football club FC SG Gartow, before moving to Hamburger SV in 2007. She joined Magdeburger FFC in 2008, where she played in the third-tier Regionalliga. At Magdeburg Schult became a regular starter and achieved promotion with her team to the 2. Frauen-Bundesliga, where she played two full seasons. In 2011, Schult signed a three-year contract with Frauen-Bundesliga side SC 07 Bad Neuenahr. In 2013, she signed a two-year contract with Bundesliga and UEFA Women's Champions League champions VfL Wolfsburg.

In April 2022, she signed an 18-month contract with NWSL club Angel City FC. However, she featured in only one match, and left the club in November that year.

In April 2024, she joined Hamburger SV until the end of the 2023–24 season.

On 2 August 2024, the Kansas City Current announced that they had signed Schult through the end of the 2024 season. She left the club in December.

== International career ==
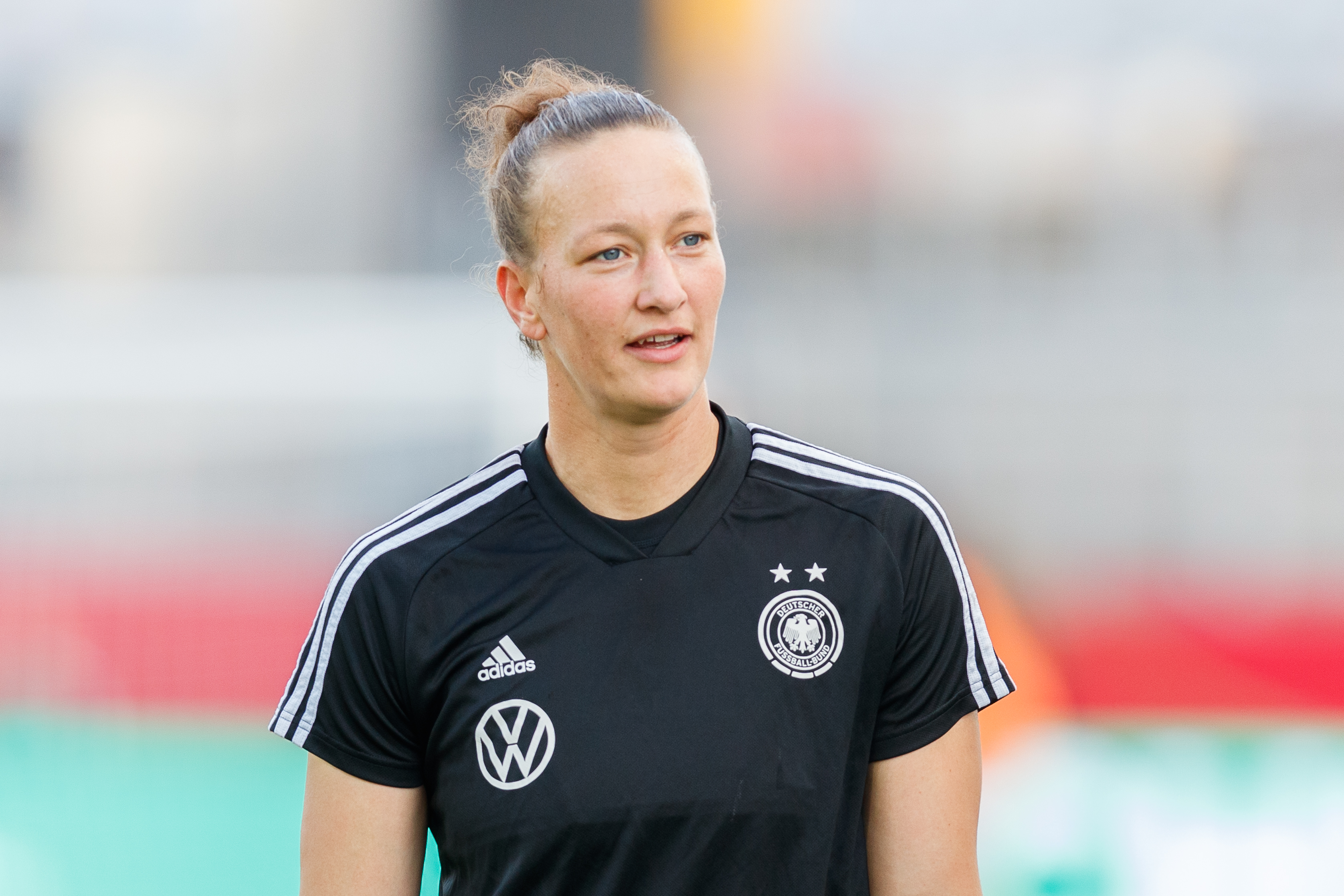
Almuth Schult in 2021.

Schult reached third-place with Germany at the 2008 FIFA U-17 Women's World Cup, appearing in two matches. Two years later, she was Germany's first choice goalkeeper at the 2010 U-20 Women's World Cup, which the team won. The tournament was played on home soil in Germany. Schult was called up as third goalkeeper for Germany's 2011 Women's World Cup squad. Her first team debut was on 15 February 2012 against Turkey.

After the retirement of Nadine Angerer, Schult's first major tournament as the starting goalkeeper for Germany came at the 2016 Summer Olympics, where she played every minute and earned Germany their first ever gold medal in women's Olympic football.

== Personal life ==
She is married. In spring 2020, she became the mother of twins and a third child in August 2023.

== Honours ==
VfL Wolfsburg

- Bundesliga: 2013–14, 2016–17, 2017–18, 2018–19
- DFB-Pokal: 2014–15, 2015–16, 2016–17, 2017–18, 2018–19
- UEFA Women's Champions League: 2014

Kansas City Current

- NWSL x Liga MX Femenil Summer Cup: 2024

Germany

- UEFA European Women's Championship: 2013, runner-up: 2022
- Summer Olympic Games: Gold medal, 2016
- Algarve Cup: 2012, 2014

Germany U20

- FIFA U-20 Women's World Cup: 2010

Germany U17

- FIFA U-17 Women's World Cup: third place 2008

Individual

- IFFHS World's Best Woman Goalkeeper: 2014
- IFFHS World's Best Woman Goalkeeper of the Decade 2011–2020
