= Annabel Jäger =

German footballer

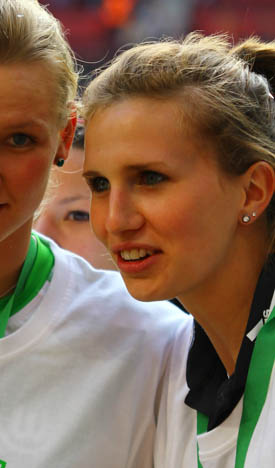
- Jäger in 2013

Personal information
- Full name: Annabel Jäger
- Date of birth: 6 January 1994 (age 32)
- Place of birth: Gütersloh, Germany
- Height: 1.70 m (5 ft 7 in)
- Position: Midfielder

Team information
- Current team: Arminia Bielefeld (manager)

Youth career
- 2000–2009: FC Gütersloh 2000
- 2009–2012: FSV Gütersloh 2009

Senior career*
| Years | Team | Apps | (Gls) |
| 2009–2012 | FSV Gütersloh 2009 | 39 | (28) |
| 2012–2013 | VfL Wolfsburg | 2 | (0) |
| 2013–2015 | Cloppenburg | 31 | (5) |
| 2015–2016 | FSV Gütersloh 2009 | 17 | (6) |
| 2016–2020 | Arminia Bielefeld | 47 | (16) |

International career
| 2008–2009 | Germany U15 | 10 | (2) |
| 2009–2011 | Germany U17 | 14 | (4) |
| 2012–2013 | Germany U19 | 17 | (4) |
| 2012–2014 | Germany U20 | 8 | (1) |

Managerial career
- 2020–2023: FC Kaunitz (assistant)
- 2023–: Arminia Bielefeld
- * Club domestic league appearances and goals

Annabel Jäger (born 6 January 1994) is a German former football midfielder, who currently coaches German side Arminia Bielefeld.

== Career ==
=== Club ===
Jäger started her senior career at hometown club FSV Gütersloh in 2009, where they achieved promotion to the Bundesliga. She later joined VfL Wolfsburg for the 2012–13 season, where she won the treble, UEFA Champions League, Bundesliga and DFB-Pokal with the club. She then played for Cloppenburg, before returning to FSV Gütersloh, and concluding her career at Arminia Bielefeld.

=== International ===
As an Under-17 international, she played the 2011 U-17 European Championship where she was the tournament's top joint scorer with teammate Lina Magull.

She also represented Germany U20 during the 2012 FIFA U-20 World Cup, featuring in the 1–0 final loss against the United States.

=== Coaching ===
Following her playing retirement, Jäger was appointed as assistant coach at FC Kaunitz. In May 2023, she became the head coach of her former club Arminia Bielefeld.
