= Mirte Roelvink =

Dutch footballer

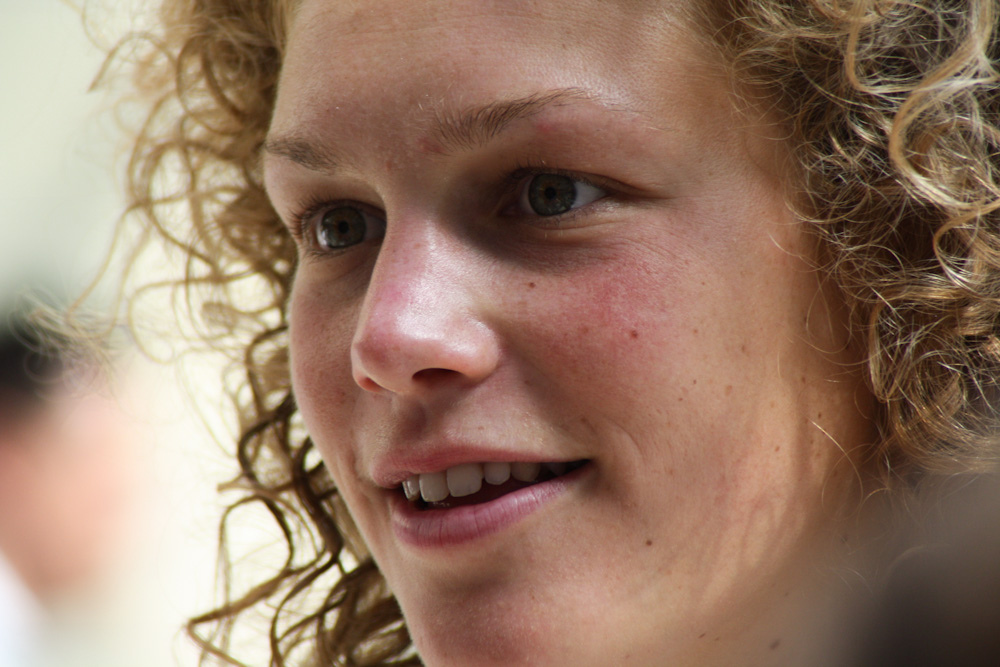
- Roelvink in July 2011

Personal information
- Full name: Mirte Roelvink
- Date of birth: 23 November 1985 (age 40)
- Place of birth: Zutphen, Netherlands
- Height: 1.63 m (5 ft 4 in)
- Position: Right back

Youth career
- 1995–: Wilhelmina SSS
- –2004: VV Oeken

Senior career*
Years	Team	Apps	(Gls)
2004–2005	SC Klarenbeek		
2005–2006	SV Saestum		
2006–2007	Be Quick '28		
2007–2010	FC Twente	62	(1)
2010–2011	FCR 2001 Duisburg	4	(0)
2011–2012	FF USV Jena	22	(0)
2012–2013	FSV Gütersloh 2009	18	(0)
2013–2014	PSV/FC Eindhoven	22	(0)

International career
2010–2013	Netherlands	7	(0)
- * Club domestic league appearances and goals

Mirte Roelvink (born 23 November 1985) is a Dutch former footballer. A right back, she played club football in the Netherlands and Germany, as well as the Netherlands women's national football team.

== Club career ==
Born in Zutphen, Roelvink started her career at the age of 9, playing locally in the youth teams of amateur clubs Wilhelmina SSS and subsequently VV Oeken before moving in 2004 to SC Klarenbeek. She left the club after one season to play in the highest Dutch women's championship (Hoofdklasse), first for SV Saestum (in 2005–06 winning the Super Cup and Hoofdklasse that season) and then for Be Quick '28 (in 2006–07).

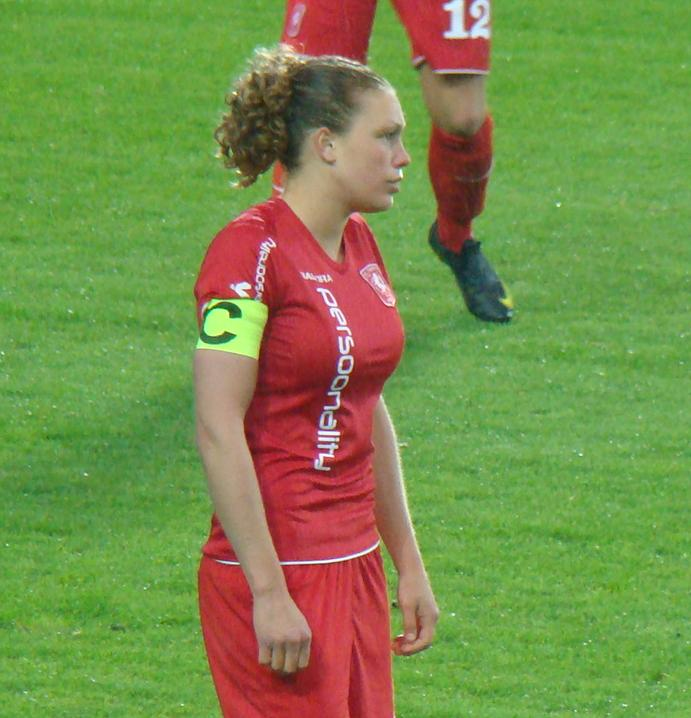
Roelvink captaining FC Twente in the Eredivisie Vrouwen

When the Dutch women's professional league (Eredivisie) was launched in 2007–08, Roelvink joined FC Twente. In her first season at the club she won the Dutch Cup. After three seasons at the club and looking to play in a stronger league, she decided to leave and move to the German Bundesliga. During her three seasons at FC Twente she played a total (in all competitions) of 71 official matches and scored 2 goals.

Ahead of the 2010–11 season, she joined German club FCR 2001 Duisburg, signing a contract for one year. On 5 August 2010, she made her debut in the UEFA Women's Champions League against Slovan Bratislava. She was quickly establishing herself at the team's defence but on 5 September 2010, during the fourth match of the Bundesliga season's campaign against FC Bayern Munich, in a ball dispute duel with Petra Wimbersky, she sustained an anterior cruciate ligament injury tear damaging her meniscus and interior ligaments, ruling her out for a minimum of half a year and she didn't feature for the club for the rest of the season.

In 2011, after recovering from her knee injury and looking to have more opportunities to play to gain match practice, she joined FF USV Jena, following former Duisburg coach Martina Voss-Tecklenburg, where she signed a one-year contract. She played 25 matches (22 league and 3 cup) at the club during the 2011–12 season.

In 2012 she left FF USV Jena to join FSV Gütersloh 2009. She played 19 matches at the club (18 league and 1 cup) during the 2012–13 season.

On 30 May 2013, Roelvink returned to the Netherlands and signed for BeNe League club PSV/FC Eindhoven. She played 22 league matches for the club at the 2012–13 season.

On 11 June 2014, her retirement was announced as she was looking to start a professional career outside of football.

== International career ==
Roelvink made her senior national team debut on 6 June 2010, a 2–0 win over Belgium in Loenhout, Wuustwezel.

On 29 June 2013 she played her 7th match for the national team, a 3–1 win over Australia in Velsen-Zuid. In the following days national team coach Roger Reijners selected Roelvink in the Netherlands squad for the UEFA Women's Euro 2013 in Sweden. She did not appear at the tournament, as established right back Dyanne Bito was selected for all three games.

== Honours ==
SV Saestum

- Dutch Championship (1): 2005–06
- Dutch Super Cup (1): 2005

FC Twente

- Dutch Cup (1): 2007–08
