= Markus Wuckel =

German footballer (born 1967)

Personal information
- Date of birth: 5 April 1967 (age 59)
- Place of birth: East Germany
- Position: Forward

Youth career
- Stahl Blankenburg
- –1984: Stahl Brandenburg

Senior career*
Years	Team	Apps	(Gls)
1984–1985	Stahl Brandenburg	9	(1)
1985–1991	1. FC Magdeburg	116	(47)
1991–1992	1. SC Göttingen	29	(16)
1992–1993	VfB Oldenburg	35	(6)
1993–1995	Arminia Bielefeld	49	(25)
1995–1996	Rot-Weiß Essen	24	(7)
1996–1997	VfB Leipzig	8	(1)
1997–1998	1. FC Saarbrücken	23	(4)
Total		293	(107)

International career
1987–1990	East Germany	4	(2)

Managerial career
- Blankenburger FV
- 1. FC Wernigerode
- 2004–2021: Arminia Bielefeld (women)
- * Club domestic league appearances and goals

Markus Wuckel (born 5 April 1967) is a German football manager and former player.

== Playing career ==
Wuckel began his career in the youth teams of BSG Stahl Blankenburg and later joined Stahl Brandenburg, playing in the youth team until 1984. The following season, Wuckel played his first nine matches in the DDR-Oberliga, scoring once. After transferring to 1. FC Magdeburg for the 1985-86 season Wuckel quickly earned a reputation as a goal-getter. In his time in Magdeburg he played in 116 Oberliga matches, scoring 47 goals, twelve FDGB-Pokal matches (9 goals) and 2 matches in the UEFA Cup. When Magdeburg failed to qualify for a professional league following German reunification, Wuckel joined 1. SC Göttingen 05 who played in the then third-tier Oberliga Nord. He later played for several sides in the 2. Bundesliga such as VfB Oldenburg, Arminia Bielefeld, Rot-Weiss Essen und VfB Leipzig before he joined 1. FC Saarbrücken in 1997 where he ended his playing career in the following year.

Wuckel played in 125 DDR-Oberliga matches, scoring 48 goals, 43 2. Bundesliga matches with 7 goals and 74 matches in the Regionalliga with 24 goals. In the Oberliga he played 29 matches and scored 16 goals.

Additionally, Wuckel played for his country in four matches, scoring twice. In addition he scored 11 goals in 24 matches for the East German Olympic team and another 11 goals in 28 matches for the Under-21 national team.

== Post-playing career ==
After a management and marketing education Wuckel passed the manager seminar with the DFB. Afterwards he was director, manager and president of his home club Blankenburger FV, before managing 1. FC Wernigerode in the Verbandsliga Sachsen-Anhalt. He later managed Arminia Bielefeld's women's team between 2004 and 2021.

Wuckel owns a footballing school in Boltenhagen on the Baltic Sea.
