= 2018–19 Frauen-Bundesliga =

Frauen-Bundesliga
- Season: 2018–19
- Champions: VfL Wolfsburg
- Relegated: Werder Bremen; Borussia Mönchengladbach
- Champions League: VfL Wolfsburg; Bayern Munich
- Matches: 132
- Goals: 517 (3.92 per match)
- Top goalscorer: Ewa Pajor (24 goals)
- Biggest home win: Munich 9–0 Mönchengladbach
- Biggest away win: Leverkusen 1–10 Munich; Sand 0–9 Wolfsburg; Mönchengladbach 0–9 Frankfurt
- Highest scoring: Leverkusen 1–10 Munich
- Attendance: 109,944 (833 per match)

The 2018–19 season of the Frauen-Bundesliga was the 29th season of Germany's premier women's football league. It ran from 15 September 2018 to 12 May 2019.

VfL Wolfsburg won their third straight and fifth overall title.

== Teams ==
Locations of teams in the 2018–19 Frauen-Bundesliga

=== Team changes ===
Promoted from 2017–18 2. Bundesliga	Relegated from 2017–18 Bundesliga
Bayer Leverkusen; Borussia Mönchengladbach	FF USV Jena; 1. FC Köln

=== Stadiums ===
Team	Home city	Home ground	Capacity
Werder Bremen	Bremen	Weserstadion Platz 11	1,000
MSV Duisburg	Duisburg	PCC-Stadion	3,000
SGS Essen	Essen	Stadion Essen	20,000
1. FFC Frankfurt	Frankfurt	Stadion am Brentanobad	5,500
SC Freiburg	Freiburg	Möslestadion	18,000
1899 Hoffenheim	Hoffenheim	Dietmar-Hopp-Stadion	6,350
Bayer 04 Leverkusen	Leverkusen	Jugendleistungszentrum Kurtekotten	1,140
Borussia Mönchengladbach	Mönchengladbach	Grenzlandstadion	10,000
Bayern Munich	Munich	Grünwalder Stadion	12,500
Turbine Potsdam	Potsdam	Karl-Liebknecht-Stadion	10,786
SC Sand	Willstätt	Kühnmatt Stadion	2,000
VfL Wolfsburg	Wolfsburg	AOK Stadium	5,200

== League table ==
Pos	Team	Pld	W	D	L	GF	GA	GD	Pts	Qualification or relegation
1	VfL Wolfsburg (C)	22	19	2	1	94	11	+83	59	Qualification for Champions League
2	Bayern Munich	22	17	4	1	75	18	+57	55	Qualification for Champions League
3	Turbine Potsdam	22	12	6	4	59	25	+34	42	
4	SGS Essen	22	11	8	3	50	28	+22	41	
5	1. FFC Frankfurt	22	10	4	8	48	38	+10	34	
6	1899 Hoffenheim	22	9	6	7	48	29	+19	33	
7	SC Freiburg	22	7	5	10	41	33	+8	26	
8	SC Sand	22	6	7	9	29	40	−11	25	
9	MSV Duisburg	22	5	4	13	21	62	−41	19	
10	Bayer Leverkusen	22	5	3	14	22	75	−53	18	
11	Werder Bremen (R)	22	4	4	14	23	48	−25	16	Relegation to 2. Bundesliga
12	Borussia Mönchengladbach (R)	22	0	1	21	7	110	−103	1	Relegation to 2. Bundesliga

Source: DFB
Rules for classification: 1) Points; 2) Goal difference; 3) Goals scored; 4) Head-to-head points; 5) Head-to-head goal difference; 6) Head-to-head goals scored; 7) Head-to-head away goals scored; 8) Away goals scored; 9) Play-off.
(C) Champions; (R) Relegated

== Results ==
Home \ Away	BRE	DUI	ESS	FRA	FRE	HOF	LEV	MÖN	MUN	POT	SAN	WOL
Werder Bremen	—	5–0	1–1	2–1	0–3	1–1	0–1	5–0	0–1	0–4	1–3	0–3
MSV Duisburg	3–0	—	0–4	0–2	1–6	2–2	1–0	3–1	0–4	1–8	2–2	1–2
SGS Essen	2–2	6–0	—	4–3	2–2	2–2	5–0	3–0	0–2	3–2	1–0	0–5
1. FFC Frankfurt	2–1	0–0	1–1	—	0–0	1–4	4–2	8–0	0–3	3–3	1–0	2–6
SC Freiburg	1–1	0–2	1–2	3–4	—	3–2	6–0	4–0	1–2	1–2	2–2	2–3
1899 Hoffenheim	4–0	3–3	1–2	0–1	2–1	—	6–2	4–1	0–1	1–0	4–0	0–1
Bayer Leverkusen	1–0	4–1	2–1	0–3	0–3	0–3	—	3–0	1–10	1–1	1–1	0–5
Borussia Mönchengladbach	0–3	0–1	0–6	0–9	0–2	0–4	4–4	—	0–5	0–7	1–4	0–7
Bayern Munich	4–1	4–0	2–2	3–1	3–0	2–1	8–0	9–0	—	5–0	1–1	4–2
Turbine Potsdam	5–0	3–0	2–2	3–1	2–0	1–1	3–0	6–0	1–1	—	2–0	1–1
SC Sand	2–0	1–0	0–1	0–1	0–0	2–2	3–0	5–0	1–1	2–3	—	0–9
VfL Wolfsburg	6–0	5–0	0–0	3–0	3–0	3–1	7–0	8–0	6–0	2–0	7–0	—

Source: DFB
Legend: Blue = home team win; Yellow = draw; Red = away team win.

== Top scorers ==
Rank	Player	Club	Goals
1	(Poland) Ewa Pajor	VfL Wolfsburg	24
2	(Denmark) Pernille Harder	VfL Wolfsburg	18
3	(Germany) Lea Schüller	SGS Essen	14
4	(Germany) Sara Däbritz	Bayern Munich	13
4	(Germany) Alexandra Popp	VfL Wolfsburg	13
6	(Germany) Mandy Islacker	Bayern Munich	12
7	(Austria) Laura Feiersinger	1. FFC Frankfurt	10
7	(Germany) Laura Freigang	1. FFC Frankfurt	10
9	(Austria) Nicole Billa	1899 Hoffenheim	9
9	(Germany) Lena Oberdorf	SGS Essen	9
9	(Slovenia) Lara Prašnikar	Turbine Potsdam	9
9	(Germany) Maximiliane Rall	1899 Hoffenheim	9
9	(Sweden) Fridolina Rolfö	Bayern Munich	9
