= Kirsten Nesse =

German footballer (born 1995)

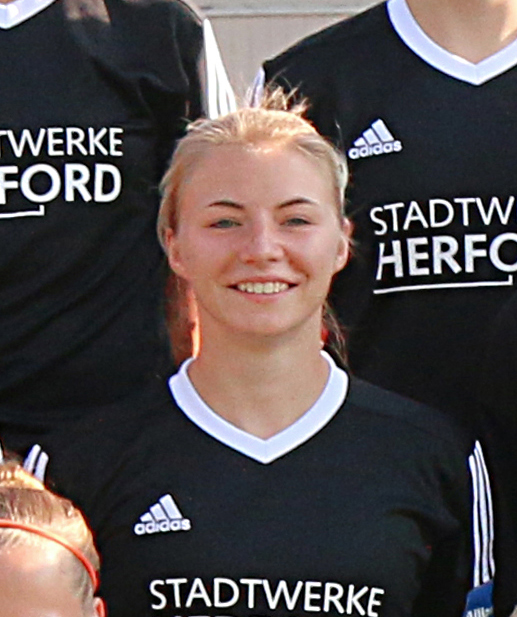
- Nesse in 2014

Personal information
- Date of birth: 19 October 1995 (age 31)
- Place of birth: Lemgo, Germany
- Position: Midfielder

Youth career
- 2005–2006: SpVg Hagen Hardissen
- 2006–2007: VfL Lieme
- 2007–2008: JSG Lieme Hörstmar
- 2009: FC Donop-Voßheide
- 2009–2011: Arminia Bielefeld
- 2011–2012: Herforder SV

Senior career*
Years	Team	Apps	(Gls)
2012–2015	Herforder SV	62	(22)
2015–2022	SGS Essen	63	(6)
- * Club domestic league appearances and goals as of 02:15, 22 March 2026 (UTC)

Kirsten Nesse (born 6 October 1995) is a German footballer who plays as a midfielder.
