= Möslestadion =

Football stadium in Freiburg im Breisgau, Germany

Coordinates: 47.9839°N 7.8812°E

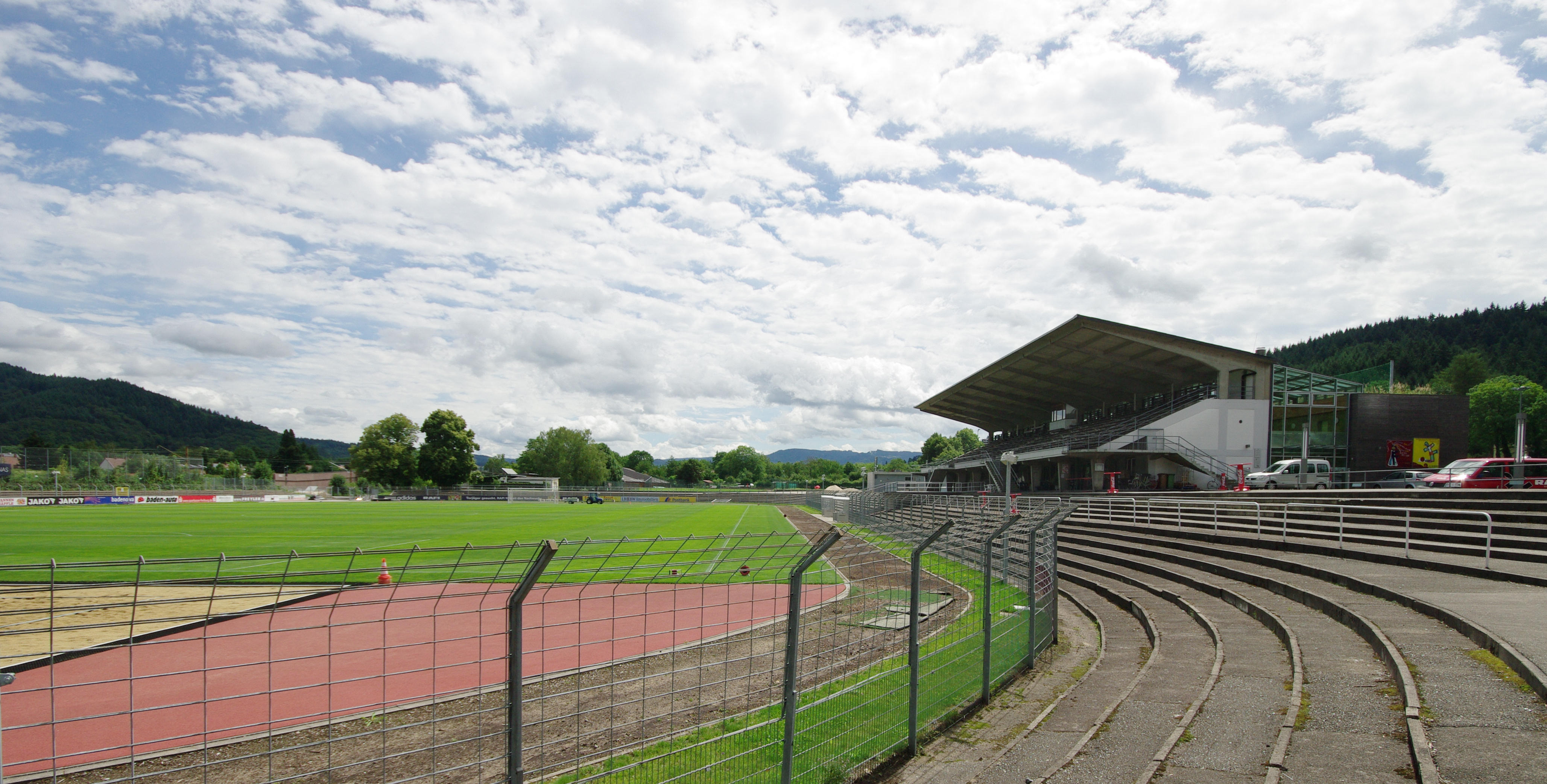
- The Möslestadion in Freiburg
- Interactive map of Möslestadion
- Location: Freiburg, Germany
- Capacity: 5,400 (1000 in covered seating area)
- Surface: Grass

Construction
- Opened: October 1st, 1922
- Renovated: June–August, 2013

Tenants
- SC Freiburg second men's team; Freiburg Soccer School; SC Freiburg (women)

The Möslestadion is a football stadium in Freiburg im Breisgau. The stadium used to be home to the Freiburger FC. Today it is used by the second men's team and the Freiburg soccer school of the SC Freiburg. Since the 2008/09 season, the stadium has also been used for the SC Freiburg women's team.

The stadium can hold about 5,400 spectators. A standing section wraps around the south, east, and west sides of the pitch, and a second standing section is located on the north side. Above the standing section to the south of the pitch are 1000 sheltered seats. The standing sections on the east and west sides behind the goals are closed.

== History ==
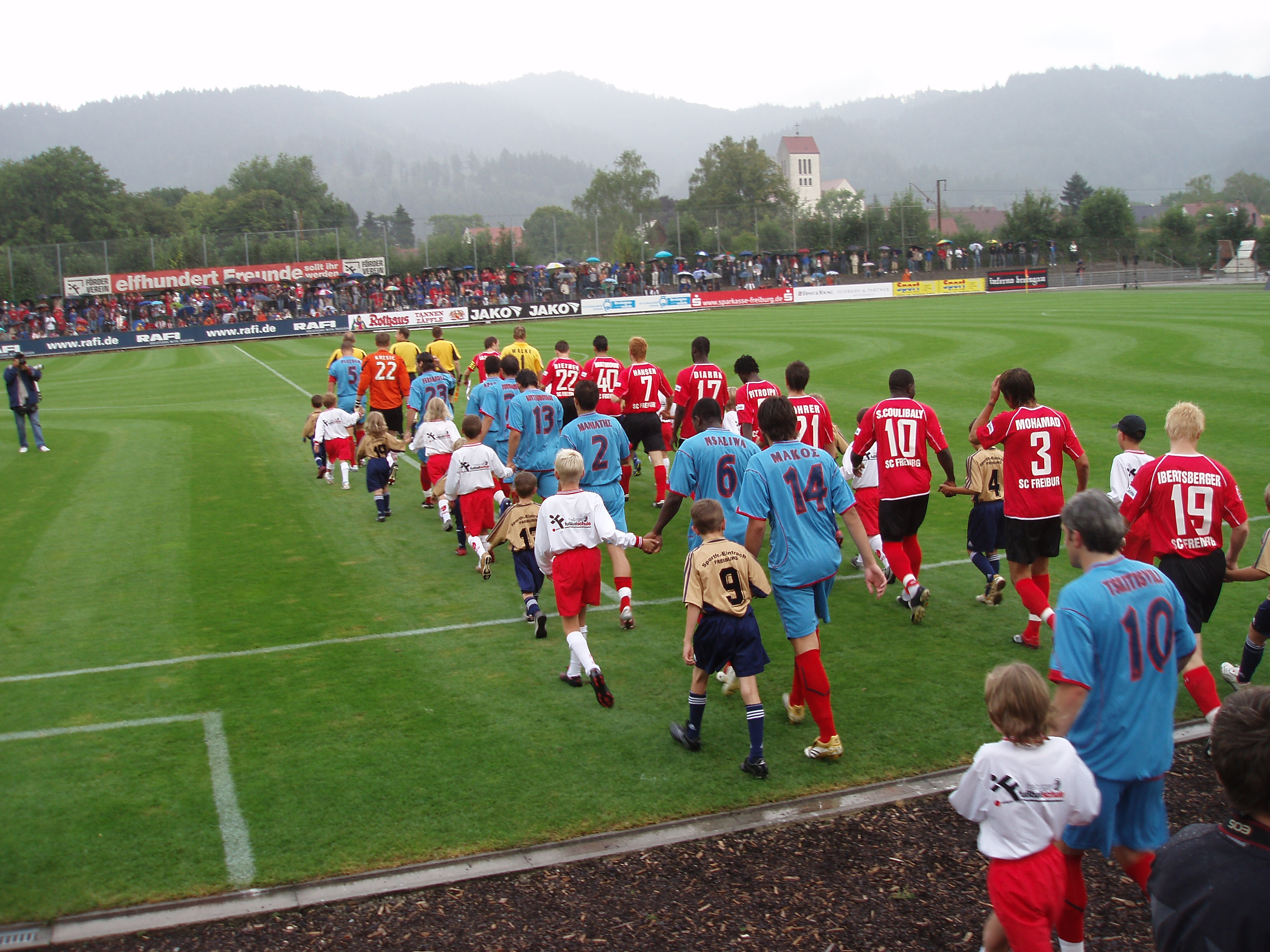
Möslestadion at the season opening 2006

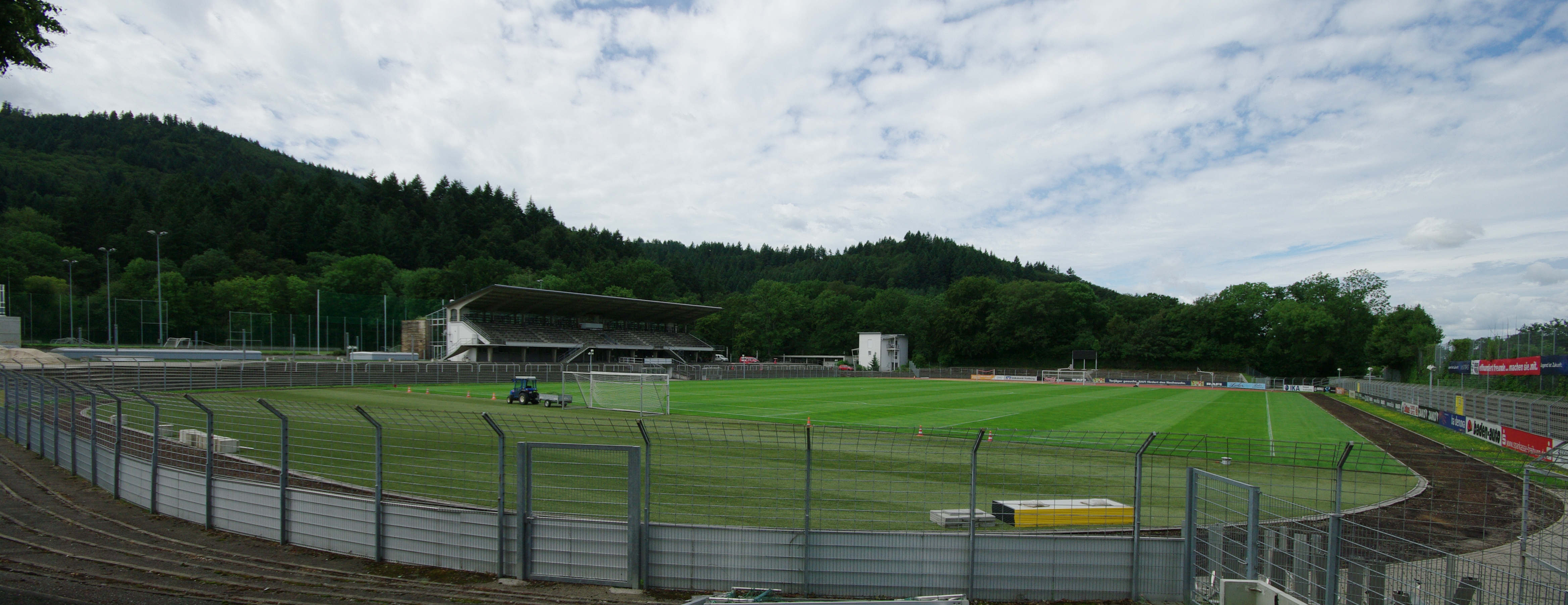
Panorama of the Möslestadion

The stadium was opened on October 1, 1922, in a game between the Freiburger FC and the Stuttgarter Kickers. On December 9, 1956, a game between the Freiburger FC and the 1. FC Nürnberg drew a record-breaking crowd of 25,000 spectators.

On January 13, 2000, after the decline of both the FC Freiburg's athletic performance and the associated financial problems, the local rival SC Freiburg took over administration of the Möslestadion for the purpose of its soccer school. In September, 2001, the Freiburg soccer school was built as an addition to the already existing stands.

From June until August, 2013, the stadium was renovated at the cost of about 500,000 euros, in order to fulfill the German Football Association's (Deutscher Fußball-Bund) licensing requirements. The stands and their wooden benches are a protected as a historic monument, and were restored "due to their documental and exemplary value". The standing sections and the fence surrounding the pitch were renewed, and the pitch received new grass.

The German Bundesliga games of the A- and B-junior leagues, the SC-Women's team, as well as tryout matches of the SC Freiburg men's team take place at the Möslestadion. The opening match of the season for the various teams have been moved to the Schwarzwald-Stadion.

== Literature ==
- Werner Skrentny (Hrsg.): Das große Buch der deutschen Fußballstadien. Verlag Die Werkstatt, Göttingen 2001, ISBN 3-89533-306-9, S. 131–133
