= Sarah Grünheid =

German footballer

Personal information
- Date of birth: 27 September 1990 (age 36)
- Place of birth: Dorsten, Germany
- Height: 1.64 m (5 ft 5 in)
- Position: Forward

Youth career
- SuS Hervest-Dorsten
- –2010: 1. FFC Recklinghausen

Senior career*
Years	Team	Apps	(Gls)
2010–2013	1. FFC Recklinghausen		
2013–2015	VfL Bochum		
2015–2016	FSV Gütersloh 2009		
2016–2021	Arminia Bielefeld		
2021–2022	Borussia Bocholt		
2022–2023	VfR Warbeyen		
- * Club domestic league appearances and goals

Sarah Grünheid (born 27 September 1990) is a German footballer who last played as a striker for VfR Warbeyen. She had previously played for 1. FFC Recklinghausen, VfL Bochum, FSV Gütersloh 2009, Arminia Bielefeld and Borussia Bocholt.
