= SV 67 Weinberg =

German football club

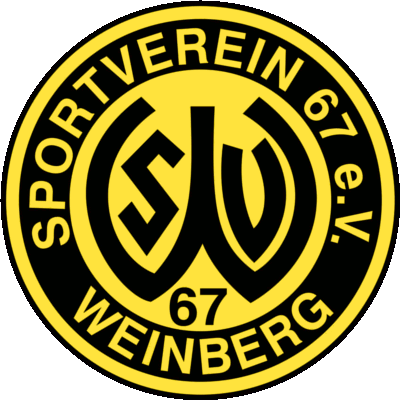
- Full name: Sportverein 67 Weinberg e. V.
- Founded: 1967
- Ground: Sportanlage Weinberg
- Capacity: 2,000
- 1st Chairman: Wolfgang Scheidacker
- Head coach: Christina Schellenberg
- League: 2. Bundesliga
- 2024–25: 2. Bundesliga, 12th of 12 (relegated)
- Website: sv67weinberg.de
Home colours	Away colours	Third colours

The SV 67 Weinberg is a German association football club based in Weinberg, a village part of Aurach. Having played in the 2. Bundesliga, its women's team will contest the Regionalliga Süd in 2025–26.

== History ==
SV 67 Weinberg was founded in 1967. It currently hosts women's and men's football teams, a tennis division, and a gymnast division.

The club's woman's football team became successful following its establishment in 1992. They were promoted to the third-tier Regionalliga Süd in 2007, before eventually gaining promotion to the 2. Bundesliga ahead of the 2013–14 season. The team stayed in the league until being relegated during the 2016–17 campaign. After winning promotion in 2018 but being relegated from the 2. Bundesliga in 2019, Weinberg won the Regionalliga Süd in 2023 and got promoted again. Having finished 12th in 2023–24, Weinberg were given a lifeline and were not relegated as MSV Duisburg, who had finished last in the 2023–24 Bundesliga, accepted an administrative relegation to the third tier. Despite a win on the first matchday of the 2024–25 season, Weinberg once again finished 12th and were relegated to the Regionalliga Süd.

Due to its small size, Weinberg's stadium was not deemed fit to host 2. Bundesliga matches by the DFB, which forced the women's team to play at different grounds during its separate stays in the league.

== Squad ==
Note: Flags indicate national team as defined under FIFA eligibility rules; some limited exceptions apply. Players may hold more than one non-FIFA nationality.

No.	Pos.	Nation	Player
1	GK	(Germany) GER	Marie Stangl
2	DF	(Germany) GER	Anna Grimm
3	DF	(Germany) GER	Mara Grimm
4	DF	(Germany) GER	Nadine Hilkert
7	FW	(Germany) GER	Katharina Wiesinger
8	FW	(Germany) GER	Pia Schneider
9	FW	(Germany) GER	Anna Wachal
10	MF	(Germany) GER	Sophia Klärle
11	MF	(Germany) GER	Marlene Ganßer
12	FW	(Germany) GER	Anna Hofrichter
13	DF	(Germany) GER	Celine Arnold
16	FW	(Germany) GER	Ellen Riess
17	MF	(Germany) GER	Sara Hofmann
19	MF	(Germany) GER	Eva Wiesinger
21	MF	(Germany) GER	Amelie Höger
22	DF	(Germany) GER	Leonie Haberäcker

No.	Pos.	Nation	Player
23	GK	(Germany) GER	Johanna Popp
24	MF	(Germany) GER	Julia Brückner
25	FW	(Germany) GER	Solveig Schlitter
27	GK	(Germany) GER	Celia Steinert
28	MF	(Germany) GER	Ashley Belzner
29	FW	(Germany) GER	Lisa Wich
32	DF	(Germany) GER	Anna Horwath
33	GK	(Germany) GER	Franziska Glaser
—	DF	(Germany) GER	Martha Bittner
—	DF	(Germany) GER	Meike Bohn
—	MF	(Germany) GER	Dana Keßler
—	MF	(Germany) GER	Eva Lüttge
—	MF	(Germany) GER	Fee Lüttge
—	MF	(Germany) GER	Lina Reinsch
—	FW	(Germany) GER	Lea Würth

== Recent seasons ==
The recent season-by-season performance of the club:

=== Women's ===
Season	Division	Tier	Position
2004–05	Bayernliga	IV	3rd
2005–06	Bayernliga	IV	3rd
2006–07	Bayernliga	IV	2nd ↑
2007–08	Regionalliga Süd	III	5th
2008–09	Regionalliga Süd	III	4th
2009–10	Regionalliga Süd	III	2nd
2010–11	Regionalliga Süd	III	2nd
2011–12	Regionalliga Süd	III	2nd
2012–13	Regionalliga Süd	III	1st ↑
2013–14	2. Bundesliga Süd	II	9th
2014–15	2. Bundesliga Süd	II	6th
2015–16	2. Bundesliga Süd	II	10th
2016–17	2. Bundesliga Süd	II	11th ↓
2017–18	Regionalliga Süd	III	2nd ↑
2018–19	2. Bundesliga	II	13th ↓
2019–20	Regionalliga Süd	III	9th*
2020–21	Regionalliga Süd Qualigruppe 2	III	2nd*
2021–22	Regionalliga Süd Staffel 2	III	1st
2022–23	Regionalliga Süd	III	1st ↑
2023–24	2. Bundesliga	II	12th
2024–25	2. Bundesliga	II	12th ↓

*Season abandoned due to the COVID-19 pandemic.

↑ Promoted	↓ Relegated
