= Arminia Bielefeld (women) =

- Full name: Deutscher Sport-Club Arminia Bielefeld
- Founded: 1975; 51 years ago
- Ground: EDImedienArena
- Capacity: 2,500
- President: Rainer Schütte
- Manager: Annabel Jäger
- League: Regionalliga West
- 2023–24: 6th
Home colours	Away colours	Third colours

DSC Arminia Bielefeld is a women's association football club from Bielefeld, Germany. It is part of the Arminia Bielefeld club.

== History ==
DSC Arminia Bielefeld established a department for women's and girls' football in 1975. Five years later, the team was promoted to the Bezirksliga, where they competed for a year before being relegated, then quickly promoted again. In 1990, they ascended to the third-tier Verbandsliga Westfalen, only to face relegation once more, but they made a return in 2003. Markus Wuckel became their head coach in 2004, a position he held until 2021.

In 2009 and 2010, Bielefeld finished as runners-up in the renamed Westfalenliga, behind 1. FFC Recklinghausen and Sportfreunde Siegen, respectively. During the 2014–15 season, the club signed two Polish players Kamila Kmiecik and Symela Ciesielska, who played pivotal roles in securing the division championship and earning promotion to the Regionalliga West.

In the 2015–16 Regionalliga West season, Bielefeld finished at the top of the league, achieving promotion to the 2. Bundesliga. They remained undefeated throughout the season, scoring 124 goals, with Maxine Birker contributing 34 goals and Kamila Kmiecik with 32.

Following their promotion to the 2. Bundesliga, the team relocated from the artificial-turf Sportplatz Stadtheide to the Waldstadion Quelle. After being relegated in their second season, they were promoted back in 2019 and moved to the EDImedienArena, staying for two more seasons before returning to the Regionalliga. During the 2020–21 season, head coach Markus Wuckel was replaced by Tom Rerucha. In May 2023, former player Annabel Jäger became the club's manager ahead of the 2023–24 season.

== Squad ==
As of 23 June 2026

Note: Flags indicate national team as defined under FIFA eligibility rules; some limited exceptions apply. Players may hold more than one non-FIFA nationality.

No.	Pos.	Nation	Player
1	GK	GER	Lisa Venrath
4	DF	GER	Celine Preuß
6	DF	GER	Leonie Heitlindemann
8	MF	GER	Fabienne Brakemeier
9	MF	GER	Sophia Thiemann
10	MF	GER	Lisa Lösch
11	FW	GER	Sophia Pauli
12	MF	GER	Thandie Reinkensmeier
13	FW	GER	Clara Bockrath Esparza
14	FW	GER	Jana Richter
15	DF	GER	Lea Bultmann
16	MF	GER	Jana Leuchtmann

No.	Pos.	Nation	Player
17	MF	GER	Inci Fenu
18	DF	GER	Rieke Barkhausen
19	MF	KOS	Eleonora Ejupi
20	MF	GER	Lena Strothmann
21	FW	GER	Emelie Klingen
22	GK	GER	Kira Kutzinski
23	MF	GER	Maren Allmeroth
24	MF	GER	Martha Stuckenschnieder
25	DF	GER	Paula Peters
26	FW	GER	Anna Czekalla
27	MF	GER	Jocelyn Hampel
28	MF	GER	Hannah Wehmeyer
29	DF	GER	Marie Bärenwaldt

== Current staff ==
As of 25 June 2024

Coaching staff
(Germany) Annabel Jäger	Head coach
(Germany) Daniel Bartke	Assistant coach
(Germany) Volker Drobe	Goalkeeping coach
Managerial staff
(Germany) Torsten Schäfer	Sports Director
(Germany) Florentine Mielke	Team Manager
(Germany) Julia Schnell	Matchday Organization
(Germany) Hannes Meier (Germany) Tobias Lison	Supervisor
Medical department
(Germany) Sarah Bauer	Osteopath

== Notable former players ==
- (Germany) Maxine Birker
- (Germany) Claudia Bujna
- (Germany) Lena Göllner
- (Germany) Sarah Grünheid
- (Germany) Deniz Harbert
- (Germany) Annabel Jäger
- (Germany) Merza Julević
- (Germany) Nina Lange
- (Germany) Kirsten Nesse
- (Germany) Giustina Ronzetti
- (Germany) Friederike Schaaf
- (Germany) Carina Schlüter
- (Germany) Lena Schulte
- (Germany) Maja Sternad
- (Germany) Susanne Werner
- (Austria) Sandra Hausberger
- (Austria) Magdalena Jakober
- (Kosovo) Gentiana Fetaj
- (Namibia) Veweziwa Kotjipati
- (New Zealand) Jana Radosavljević
- (Poland) Karolina Bochra
- (Poland) Symela Ciesielska
- (Poland) Kamila Kmiecik
- (Romania) Nicu Burgheim
- (Turkey) Aylin Yaren
