= FSV Gütersloh 2009 =

- Full name: Frauensportverein; Gütersloh 2009 e.V.
- Founded: 1984; 2009; 17 years ago
- Ground: Tönnies-Arena; Heidewaldstadion
- Capacity: 4,252 / 12,500
- Chairman: Sebastian Kmoch
- Manager: Markus Graskamp
- League: 2. Frauen-Bundesliga
- 2024–25: 14th of 14 (relegated)
- Website: http://www.fsv-guetersloh-2009.de/
Home colours	Away colours

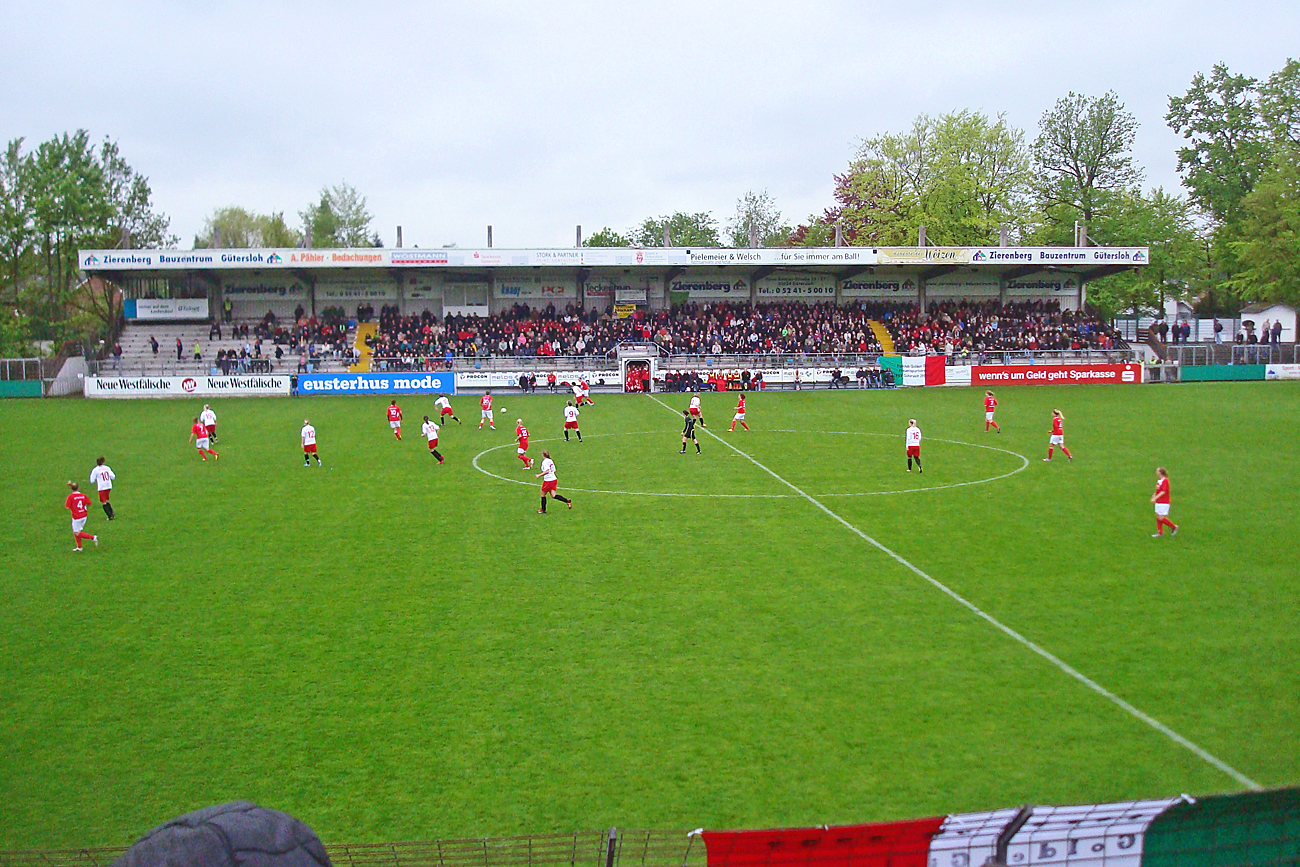
FSV Gütersloh (red) vs. Mellendorfer TV (white)

FSV Gütersloh 2009 (Frauensportverein, e.g. Women's Sports Club) is a German women's football club from Gütersloh. It currently competes in the 2. Bundesliga.

It has its origin in the women's team of FC Gütersloh, which was founded in 1984. In 2001 it reached the 2. Bundesliga. They were relegated two years later, but they returned and in 2006 FC Gütersloh was the category's runner-up, their best performance to date. In 2009 the team decided to separate from FC Gütersloh and become an independent club, and adopted its current name.

== Players ==
=== Current squad ===
As of 27 October 2025.

Note: Flags indicate national team as defined under FIFA eligibility rules; some limited exceptions apply. Players may hold more than one non-FIFA nationality.

No.	Pos.	Nation	Player
1	GK	GER	Leah Blome
3	DF	GER	Elina Büttner
4	DF	GER	Emma Bendix
5	MF	GER	Leandra Kammermann
6	FW	GER	Sophie Nitsch
8	FW	GER	Anna-Lena Meier
9	FW	GER	Katherina Rädeker
10	FW	GER	Greta Hohensee
11	MF	GER	Lena Meynert
12	GK	GER	Rebecca Otto
12	GK	GER	Celina Seggelmann
14	MF	POL	Natalia Marczak
16	MF	GER	Janna Koerdt
17	DF	GER	Clara Koepke
18	FW	GER	Pauline Pfeiffer
19	FW	GER	Pauline Berning

No.	Pos.	Nation	Player
19	DF	GER	Lara Mehn
20	FW	GER	Ann-Sophie Schindler
21	DF	GER	Tina Rother (captain)
22	MF	GER	Anna Stockmann
23	DF	GER	Birgitta Schmücker
24	MF	GER	Antonia Schön
31	MF	GER	Hannah Lessner
33	GK	GER	Emily Wittkowsky
—	DF	GER	Helena Babić
—	MF	GER	Elaine Eickmann
—	MF	GER	Kate Ogwago
—	MF	GER	Jule Schobel
—	MF	GER	Elanur Topal
—	MF	GER	Mia Wesseler
—	FW	GER	Luljeta Dragaj

=== Former players ===
- Laura Giuliani
- Mirte Roelvink
