= Mana Iwabuchi =

Japanese footballer (born 1993)

Mana Iwabuchi 岩渕 真奈
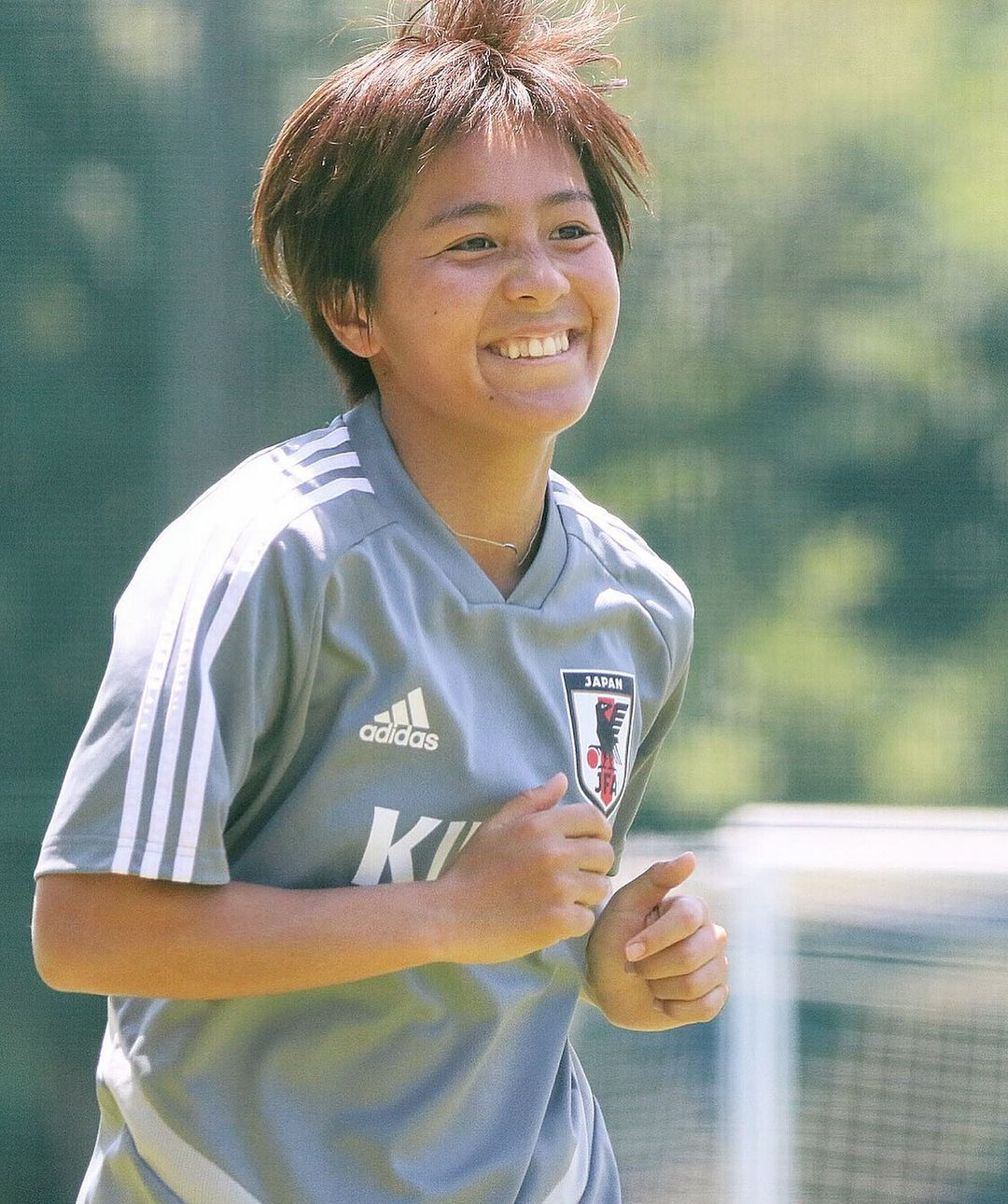
- Iwabuchi with Japan in 2019

Personal information
- Date of birth: 18 March 1993 (age 33)
- Place of birth: Musashino, Tokyo, Japan
- Height: 1.56 m (5 ft 1 in)
- Position: Forward

Youth career
- 2005–2007: Nippon TV Beleza

Senior career*
Years	Team	Apps	(Gls)
2007–2012	Nippon TV Beleza	64	(30)
2012–2014	1899 Hoffenheim	30	(10)
2014–2017	Bayern Munich	24	(5)
2017–2020	INAC Kobe Leonessa	47	(11)
2020–2021	Aston Villa	13	(2)
2021–2023	Arsenal	14	(1)
2023	→ Tottenham Hotspur (loan)	13	(1)

International career^{‡}
2007–2008	Japan U17	7	(3)
2009–2010	Japan U20	7	(6)
2010–2023	Japan	89	(37)
Medal record
Representing Japan
Olympic Games
Silver medal – second place	2012 London	Team
FIFA Women's World Cup
Gold medal – first place	2011 Germany
Silver medal – second place	2015 Canada
AFC Women's Asian Cup
Gold medal – first place	2018 Jordan
Asian Games
Gold medal – first place	2018 Jakarta-Palembang	Team
AFC U-19 Women's Championship
Gold medal – first place	2009 China
AFC U-16 Women's Championship
Silver medal – second place	2007 Malaysia
- * Club domestic league appearances and goals as of 4 June 2023 ‡ National team caps and goals as of 21:39, 1 September 2023 (UTC)

Mana Iwabuchi (岩渕 真奈, Iwabuchi Mana; born 18 March 1993) is a Japanese former professional footballer who played as a forward or attacking midfielder. She was most recently with Tottenham Hotspur and has previously played for Aston Villa, Bayern Munich, 1899 Hoffenheim, and Arsenal. She has also represented the Japan national team.

Iwabuchi is regarded as a gifted technician known for her ball control and weight of pass. Due to her diminutive stature and ability to dribble past opponents, she is nicknamed 'Manadona' in her home country, after the Argentine legend Diego Maradona.

Known to many as the face of women's football in Japan, Iwabuchi has represented the Japan women's national football team since age 16, enjoying some of her greatest successes on the world stage. She made her full international debut in 2010, and she has since earned over 85 caps and scored 37 goals for Japan. Having participated in three consecutive FIFA Women's World Cup tournaments, Iwabuchi was part of the squad won the title in 2011, appearing as a substitute in the final in Germany when she was just 18 years old. Iwabuchi also has a silver medal to her name from the 2012 Summer Olympics in London and a gold medal from the 2018 Asian Games.

Iwabuchi has been named in the IFFHS AFC Woman Team of the Decade, Asian Young Footballer of the Year twice, recipient of the FIFA U-17 Women's World Cup Golden Ball, the AFC U-19 Women's Championship MVP and Golden Boot, the EAFF Women's Football Championship Golden Boot twice over, and the AFC Women's Asian Cup MVP. Amongst her list of accolades, she is also the youngest ever recipient (aged 18 years 5 months and 0 days) of the People's Honour Award, a prestigious government commendation bestowed by the Prime Minister of Japan, when she received it as part of the World Cup-winning squad of 2011. The youngest person to win the honour individually, is the Japanese figure skater and two-time Olympic champion Yuzuru Hanyu (aged 23 years 6 months and 25 days).

On 1 September 2023, Iwabuchi announced her retirement from professional football. She has since been active as a pundit and football presenter on Japanese television.

== Early life and education ==
Born and raised in Musashino, Iwabuchi began kicking a football and developing her love for the sport at the age of six. At the time, she was also enrolled in piano and ballet lessons. However, her older brother Ryota and the coach of his football club had been persuading her for about a year to join them.

Finally, at age eight, she followed in Ryota's footsteps and joined the local club team, Sekimae SC, where he played. Her talent was recognised early on, and she was invited to train with the older boys. The club was originally called 'Sekimae Boys Soccer Club', but because Iwabuchi became the first girl to join, they renamed the club to 'Sekimae Soccer Club'. A notable figure she was teammates with in her youth is well-known Japanese actor Ryo Ryusei, who commented years later that "she would be dribbling past boys with ease" from an early age and was one of the reasons he gave up on being a professional footballer as he watched her play and realised he would not be good enough.

Iwabuchi attended Komazawa Women's University and was admitted to the Faculty of Intercultural Studies.

Her older brother Ryota, is also a professional footballer currently playing for Fujieda MYFC as a midfielder.

== Club career ==
=== Nippon TV Beleza ===
At the age of 14, on 21 October 2007, she debuted for Nippon TV Beleza in the Nadeshiko League, Japan's premier division for women's football. By the next year, she had established herself within the first team and received the Best Young Player award for the 2008 season.

During the Nadeshiko League Cup Final on 22 August 2010, her goal in the final minute led Nippon TV Beleza to a 3–2 win against Urawa Reds Ladies. She was named the tournament's MVP. Post-match, she commented on her performance, reflecting a desire to improve and measure up to the standards set by Homare Sawa. She inherited the number 10 jersey from Sawa in the subsequent season at the age of 17.

In the 2011 season, she was the top scorer for her team and the third-highest in the league with 9 goals. Her efforts earned her the Most Hardworking Player award, and she was chosen for the league's Best Eleven.

=== 1899 Hoffenheim ===
On 28 November 2012, Iwabuchi joined 1899 Hoffenheim in the 2. Bundesliga and chose the number 28 shirt, the first number she wore for Beleza as a professional footballer. On 17 March 2013, she made her debut in a 6–2 away victory against SV Bardenbach, coming on as a substitute in the 46th minute. On 31 March 2013, she scored her first goal in a 3–2 win over 1. FFC Niederkirchen. Iwabuchi finished the 2012–13 season with four goals in nine appearances as Hoffenheim won the Southern division and were promoted to the Bundesliga.

In the following season, she changed her shirt number to 13. On 8 September 2013, she scored Hoffenheim's first-ever goal in the top flight in a 1–0 home victory against VfL Sindelfingen. In the second-last fixture of the season, Iwabuchi faced her future club Bayern Munich; she scored 2 goals and assisted one as Hoffenheim came back from two goals down to win 3–2 and secured their safety from relegation. She finished the 2013–14 season with six goals in 22 appearances in all competitions.

=== Bayern Munich ===
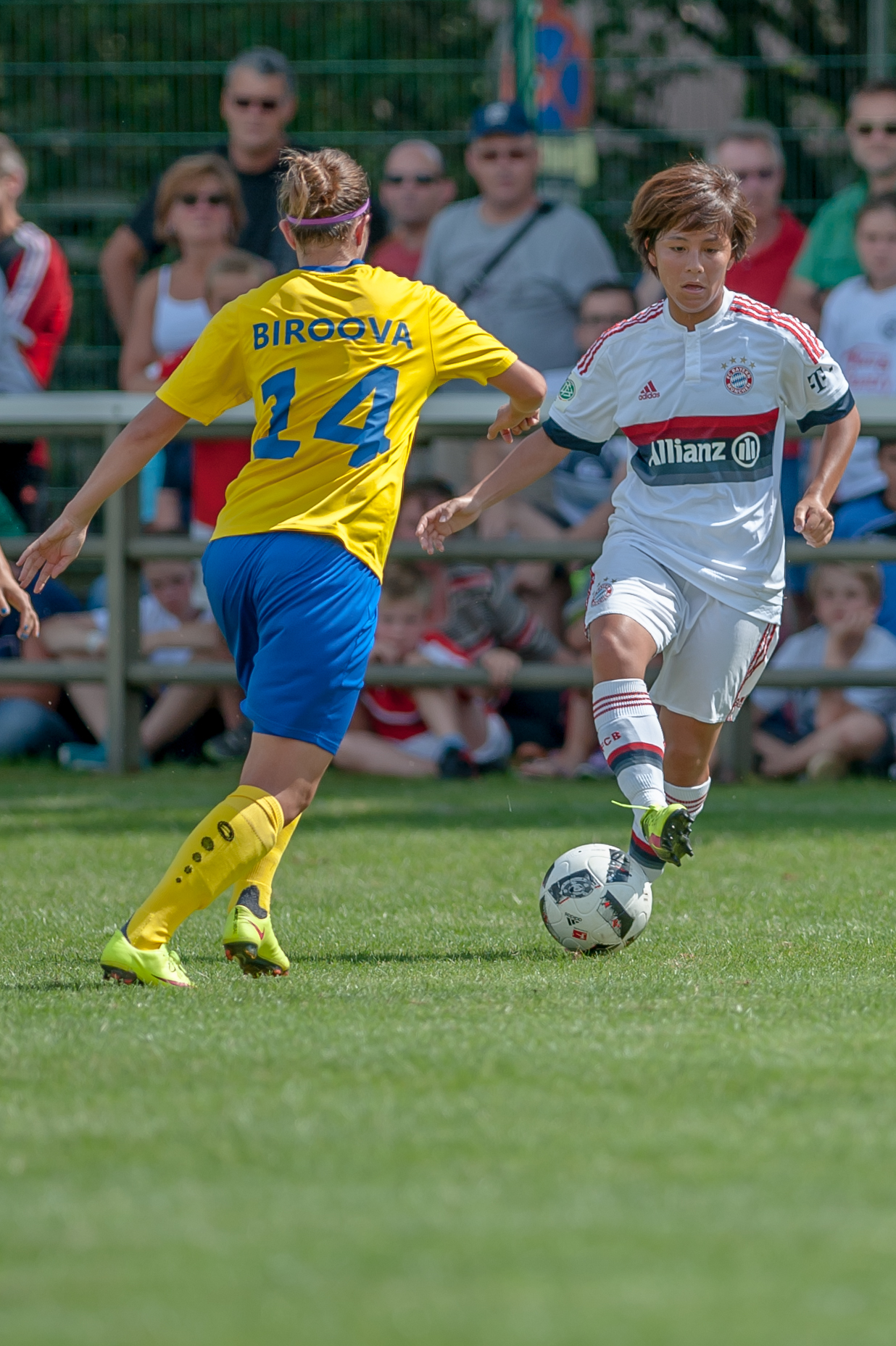
Iwabuchi playing for Bayern in July 2016

In June 2014, Iwabuchi left Hoffenheim to join Bayern Munich. During the 2014–15 season, she scored 3 goals in her debut season and was part of a Bayern team that remained undefeated in the Bundesliga and won the title for the first time since 1976.

On 30 January 2016, she signed a two-year contract extension. She helped her team lift the Bundesliga title for a second season running, scoring the equaliser against her former club Hoffenheim in a 1–1 draw on the final day of the 2015–16 season.

In March 2017, however, she announced on her blog and to the media that despite one year left, she had mutually terminated her contract with the club to return to Japan to focus on her recovery from injury.

=== INAC Kobe Leonessa ===
On 23 June 2017, Iwabuchi signed with INAC Kobe Leonessa. She had received offers from multiple clubs, and it came as a surprise to many that she decided to sign with Kobe Leonessa, as they are considered main rivals of NTV Beleza, the club she spent her youth at and played at until her move overseas to Germany. She revealed that she chose the club because they courted her most enthusiastically, and she wanted to play under manager Takeo Matsuda again. He was her coach at NTV Beleza when she was around 14 or 15 years old. Iwabuchi elaborated in a magazine interview, "At the time, I could barely keep up in training, but he would still play me in matches. But I remember feeling let down because I couldn't do much. That is why I wanted to come back and show him how much I've grown as a player, and I also wanted to learn football from him again."

On 9 September 2017, she made her return to the Nadeshiko League in Japan after five years away, coming on as a substitute against MyNavi Sendai Ladies. She then scored her first goal for the club in a 5–0 win over Okayama Yunogo Belle on 5 November 2017.

On 9 August 2020, she achieved the milestone of 100 appearances in the Nadeshiko League.

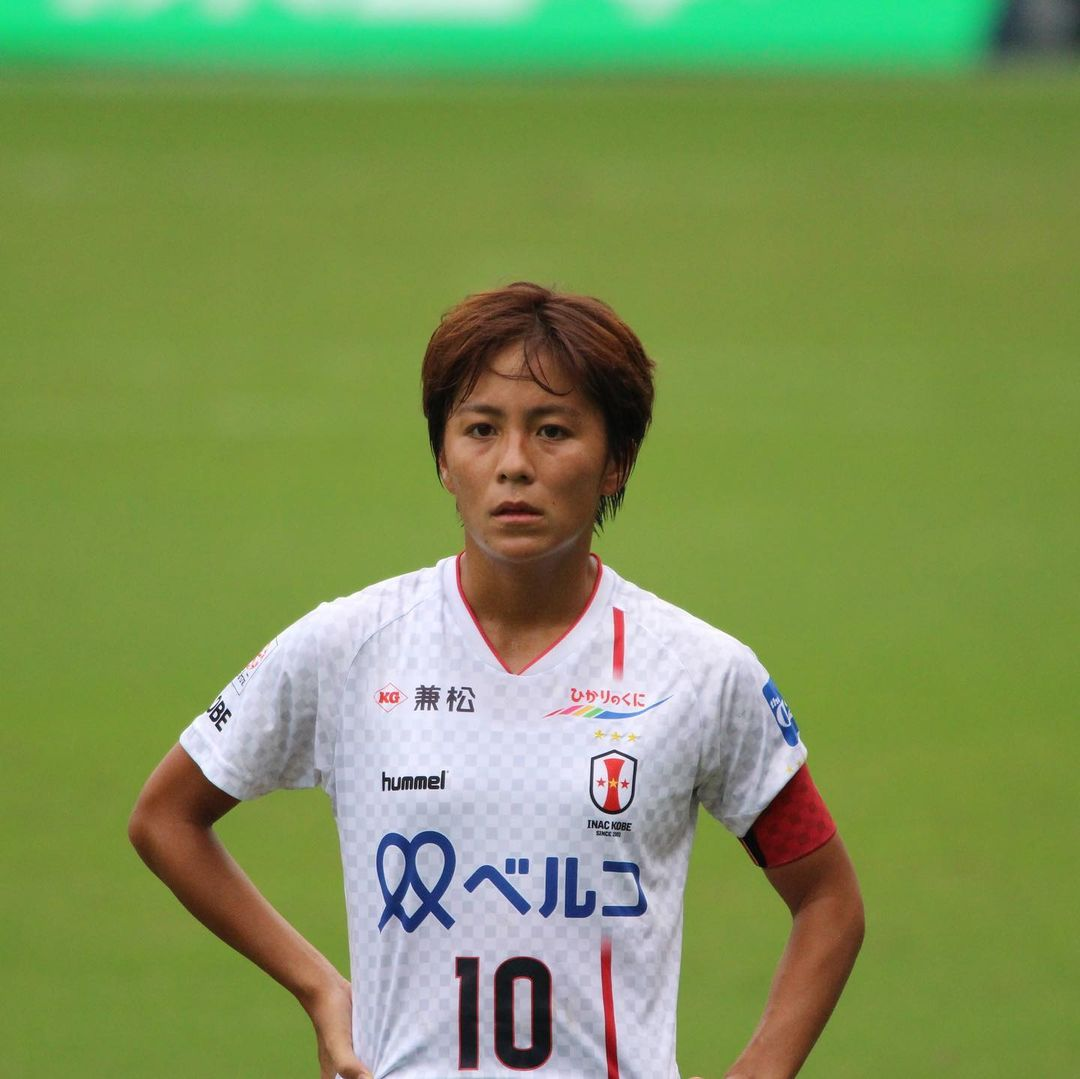
Iwabuchi wearing the captain's armband for INAC Kobe Leonessa in 2020

She was given the captain's armband in her final season with the club, where she featured 47 times and netted 11 goals.

=== Aston Villa ===
Iwabuchi returned to Europe after she signed with Aston Villa in the FA Women's Super League on 21 December 2020 and joined them mid-season in January 2021. Her signing was described by sporting director Eni Aluko as a "statement signing" for the club, and a unique deal was constructed with CEO Christian Purslow to bring Iwabuchi to the club, ahead of many other top clubs in Europe who were interested in her. Iwabuchi herself said, "receiving an offer from a club that plays in what I personally consider to be the most attractive league in the world right now, I wanted to go there without any hesitation." She added, "I have faced the England national team as a player for Japan. Firstly, I could feel the high individual level of the players, the power and technique, and their completion as a team. Second, was the fact that they are the women's team of a club that plays in the Premier League. The environment is good, so that was another attractive point."

She registered her first goal and assist for the club on her first league start against Reading on 23 January 2021.

Instrumental to Aston Villa's season-long battle to survive relegation, Iwabuchi also secured victory (and their first home win of the season) against Tottenham Hotspur on 6 February 2021 by scoring the only goal of the game, a thunderous strike from 25-yards out. Her goal was among the nominees for FA Women's Super League 20/21 Goal of the Season.

=== Arsenal ===
As her short-term contract with Villa expired at the end of June 2021, it was announced on 26 May 2021 that she would join Arsenal afterwards. The club had reportedly been trying to sign her since the summer of 2019, and again in the winter of 2020, but the move was blocked by the Japanese Football Association, who wanted her to stay in Japan till the 2020 Olympics in Tokyo had taken place.

She scored her first goal for the club on 18 August 2021 – her debut – versus Okzhetpes in the Champions League. In the next game against PSV, her second appearance for Arsenal, she scored twice. Her first goal in that match, a solo goal from a short corner, won the club's Goal of the Month poll for August in which fans vote to elect the best goal from the Men's, Women's and U-23 teams. With 64% of the votes, she became the third player from the women's team, following Kim Little and Vivianne Miedema, to win the award. In the WSL, she scored her first goal on behalf of Arsenal against her former team Villa, which Arsenal won 4–0 away on 2 October 2021.

On 14 June 2023, Arsenal confirmed that Iwabuchi will leave the club following the expiry of her contract.

==== Tottenham Hotspur (Loan) ====
Iwabuchi joined Arsenal's north London rival Tottenham Hotspur on loan until the end of the season in January 2023 after limited game-time with Arsenal. She made three appearances in the league. She made her debut for the club on 25 January 2023 in a 3–1 loss to Chelsea in the FA WSL Cup quarter-finals. She scored her first goal for the club in a win 5–0 over London City Lionesses in the FA Cup fourth round on 29 January 2023.

== International career ==
=== Youth ===
Iwabuchi began her international career in 2008 when she was selected onto the Japan U-17 national team at the age of 15, and participated in the 2008 U-17 World Cup in New Zealand. The team was defeated in the quarterfinals but a series of outstanding performances saw Iwabuchi named winner of the adidas Golden Ball as the tournament's best player. It was the first time a Japanese player, male or female, had picked up the prestigious MVP award in a FIFA competition. A French team coach hailed her as a "future star of women's football."

Iwabuchi participated in the 2009 AFC U-19 Women's Championship where she led the Young Nadeshiko to their second crown at this level. Several decisive strikes, including a late winner in the final against Korea Republic, and the only goal of the semi-final against DPR Korea, saw her finish as the tournament's joint top scorer with four goals and recipient of the MVP award yet again.

As a result, Iwabuchi was awarded the Asian Young Footballer of the Year by the Asian Football Confederation in 2008 and 2009. Despite not yet having made an appearance for the senior national team, Iwabuchi was also nominated for the FIFA World Player of the Year award (which would later become the FIFA Ballon D'or) in 2009. She was the fourth Japanese player in history and first female player to be nominated for this award.

The Japanese team was not as successful at 2010 FIFA U-20 Women's World Cup in Germany, facing elimination in the group stage. However, Iwabuchi demonstrated her ability to score key goals, grabbing a long-range equaliser in their 3–3 draw against Mexico. Despite Japan failing to progress further in the tournament, Iwabuchi was among the shortlist of ten candidates for the adidas Golden Ball at Germany 2010.

=== Senior ===
On 6 February 2010, Iwabuchi made her debut for the Japan women's national football team in the East Asian Football Championship, held in her home country of Japan. She appeared as a 60th-minute substitute in Japan's 2–0 win over China.

Five days later, aged 16, she scored her first goals at senior international level in a 3–0 win against the Chinese Taipei national team in the same competition. In her post-match interview, she said "The atmosphere here (Japan National Stadium) is special. I was pretty nervous before the match, so I'm happy that I was even able to get two goals. Goals are the accumulation of many different plays, so I'm grateful to everyone in the team. Personally, I want to do more dribbling. My goal is to be like Messi. He is small but I love his sharp dribbling skills!" Japan went on to win the championship and Iwabuchi finished as the tournament's joint top scorer.

2011 World Cup

In July 2011, she was selected to play in the 2011 FIFA Women's World Cup, the youngest member of Japan's squad at 18 years of age. She made appearances in all of Japan's games during the tournament, with the exception of the semi-final against Sweden, as Japan achieved a historic maiden title. She came on as a substitute in the final against the United States as Japan won 3–1 in a penalty shoot-out following a 2–2 draw after extra time, becoming the first Asian team to win a FIFA World Cup final.

The outcome of the game was so unexpected that it caused widespread celebration in Japan as the country was still feeling the effects of the devastating 2011 Tōhoku earthquake and tsunami that killed more than 15,000 people prior to the tournament. As a result, the entire team was bestowed the People's Honour Award, a prestigious government commendation by the Prime Minister of Japan, for the courage they brought the nation as well as the feat they achieved. They made this achievement with little support from the JFA as women's football wasn't the top priority of Japan's football development. Iwabuchi is the youngest ever recipient (aged 18 years 5 months and 0 days) of the award, while the youngest person to win the honour individually is the Japanese figure skater and two-time Olympic champion Yuzuru Hanyu (aged 23 years 6 months and 25 days).

2012 Summer Olympics

Prior to the 2012 Summer Olympics, she suffered a contusion to her right ankle, sustained in the quarter-final against Germany the previous year during the World Cup. She had to walk on crutches and was forced to withdraw from the final round of Asian Qualifiers for the Olympics.

Despite this, she recovered in time to play at the 2012 Summer Olympics in London. She featured in a total of 3 games over the course of the tournament, including a start against South Africa in the group stages.

In the gold medal match on 9 August 2012, Japan faced the United States, the two countries meeting yet again in consecutive finals of major tournaments. Similar to the previous final, Iwabuchi came on as a substitute in the 76th minute. As Japan were trailing the USA 2–1, Iwabuchi nicked the ball off defender Christie Rampone and was through on goal, with the chance to equalise. However, her curled shot to the top right corner was saved by goalkeeper Hope Solo, and Japan went on to finish as silver medalists.

Upon returning to Japan, she teared up in front of reporters when speaking during the press conference, saying "It was a true joy to stand on the greatest stage with the best teammates. The result of finishing in second place was really disappointing, but I will work even harder from here." In an interview she gave in 2021, almost nine years later, she said that she still keeps an image of the scene where she failed to score as the wallpaper on her computer so that she "never forgets the disappointment of defeat."

2015 World Cup

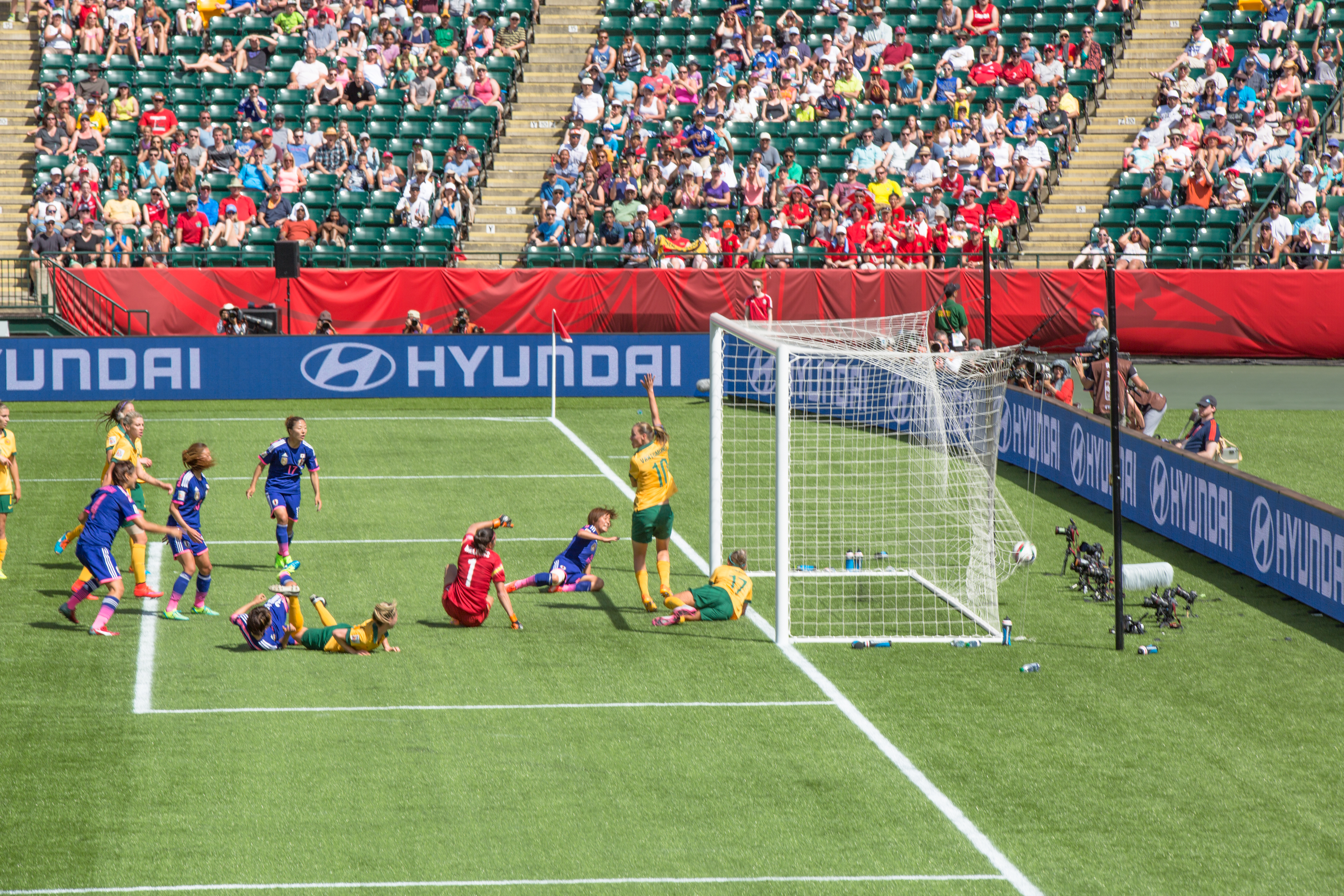
Iwabuchi (on the ground, third from right) scoring in the FIFA Women's World Cup quarterfinal match against Australia on 27 June 2015

In May 2015, just a month before the start of the 2015 FIFA Women's World Cup, Iwabuchi suffered a bruise to her right knee in a friendly game held during the national team training camp. Despite concerns as to whether she would be fit enough in time for the World Cup, head coach Norio Sasaki named her in Japan's 23-player squad where she was again the youngest member of the team.

His gamble paid off and Iwabuchi made headlines as she excelled in her role as a second-half impact substitute, playing a major role in Japan's two late wins in the quarter-final against Australia and then the dramatic semi-final against England. Her 87th-minute goal in the crucial 1–0 victory over Australia in the quarter-finals at the Commonwealth Stadium in Edmonton, Canada, was her first goal at a FIFA World Cup. Japan eventually finished as runners-up to the USA.

2016 Summer Olympics qualifying campaign

In early 2016, Iwabuchi was part of the Japan team in the 2016 AFC Women's Olympic Qualifying Tournament, where she scored important goals against South Korea, Vietnam and North Korea, finishing as the team's top scorer of the tournament. However, Japan ended the tournament in 3rd place, narrowly missing out on the top two places, which meant they had failed to qualify for the 2016 Summer Olympics.

The summer of 2016 was a significant turning point in Iwabuchi's national team career, as the "Golden Period" of the Nadeshiko's global dominance was slowly beginning to come to a close. Her mentor and legend of the women's game in Japan, Homare Sawa, had announced her retirement at the end of 2015. This was followed by long-serving national team coach Norio Sasaki, who had led them to great successes at the past two World Cups and Olympics, stepping down from his role following Japan's failure to qualify for Rio 2016. With another key player Aya Miyama, the captain at the time, also retiring from national team duty following the failure to qualify for the Olympics, press coverage posed Iwabuchi to step up as the focal point and become the star of the "future" Japanese national team.

2018 AFC Asian Cup

Despite significant pressure and media attention, Iwabuchi delivered. At the 2018 Asian Cup held in Jordan from 6–20 April, which served as the final stage of Asian qualification for the 2019 FIFA Women's World Cup, Iwabuchi played the full 90 minutes plus in all five matches over a two-week period and scored 2 goals. She led Japan to win the championship, defending their title in a 1–0 victory over Australia, and was named MVP of the tournament. "It was true joy for us to defend the Asian title," she said. "Personally, it is such an honour to claim the MVP title. However, it was the team efforts that counted so the awards belonged to the entire squad, not me."

2018 Asian Games

Later that year in August, Iwabuchi participated in the 2018 Asian Games where she played a key role yet again, contributing 2 goals as Japan won their second-ever Asian Games gold medal. In the final on 31 August 2018, Japan scored a 90th-minute goal to win 1–0 and crush China's hopes of winning a record-breaking fourth Asian Games women's football title.

2019 World Cup

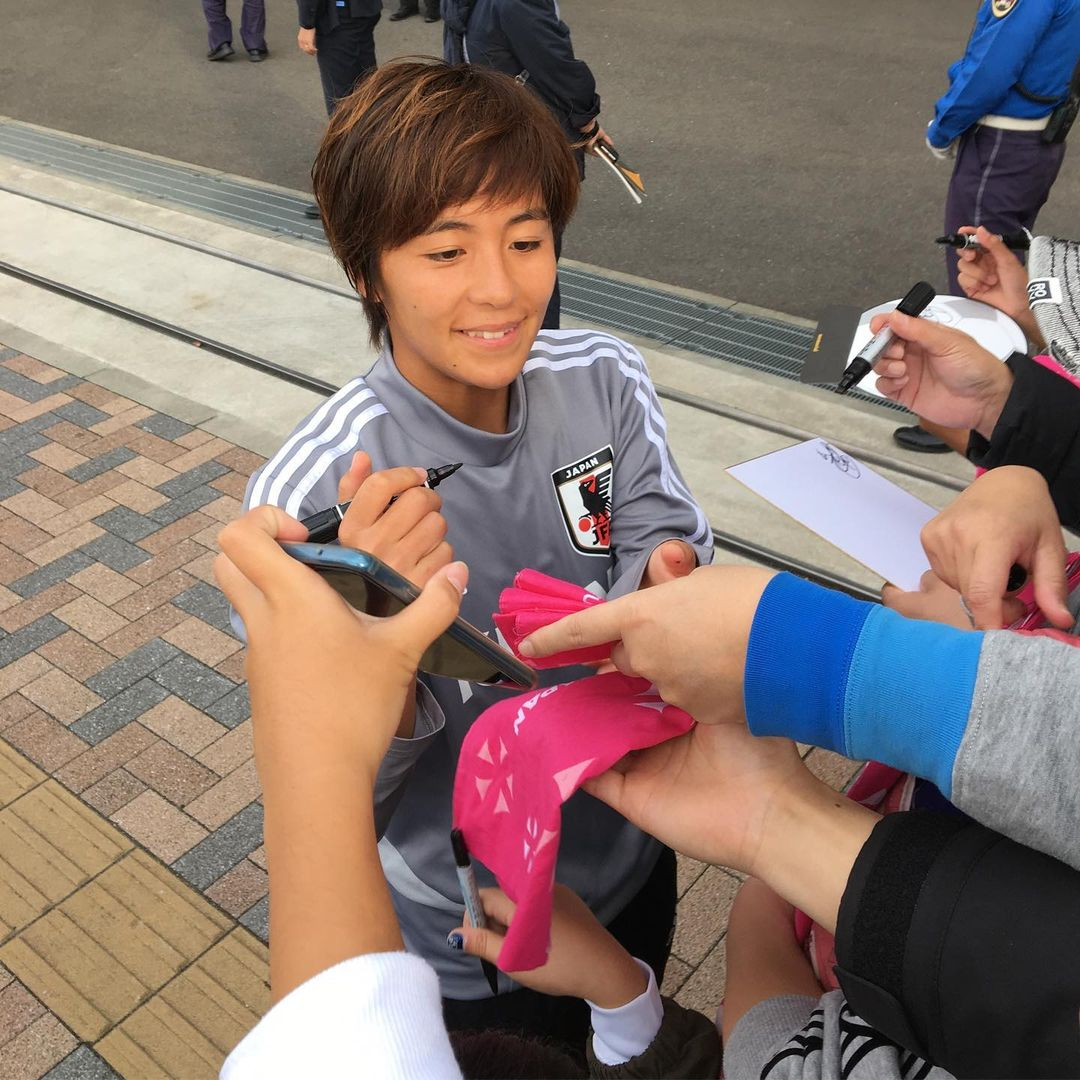
Iwabuchi signs autographs for fans after an open training session with the Japan national team in 2019

Iwabuchi participated in her third consecutive World Cup competition at the 2019 FIFA Women's World Cup in France. On 14 June 2019, she scored Japan's opening goal of the tournament, a 23rd-minute long-range strike from outside the box, and was named Player of the Match for her performance in Japan's 2–1 victory over Scotland.

Japan progressed to the knockout stages, where they faced the Netherlands in the Round of 16, and Iwabuchi provided the assist for Yui Hasegawa's equaliser, a well-worked team goal that was nominated for Goal of the Tournament. However, her side was knocked out of the tournament after conceding a 90th-minute penalty resulting from a handball in the box, eventually losing 2–1 to their Dutch opponents.

2019 EAFF East Asian Football Championship

At the 2019 EAFF E-1 Football Championship held in South Korea in December 2019, Iwabuchi was given the captain's armband for the first time in the absence of Saki Kumagai, as Japan looked to bounce back from their disappointing campaign at the World Cup earlier in the year. In addition to two goals against Chinese Taipei, Iwabuchi scored a hat-trick against China in their 3–0 victory on 15 December 2019. With a total of 5 goals, she emerged the tournament's top scorer and won the Golden Boot as she led Japan to yet another regional title, their third in the history of this competition.

2020 Summer Olympics

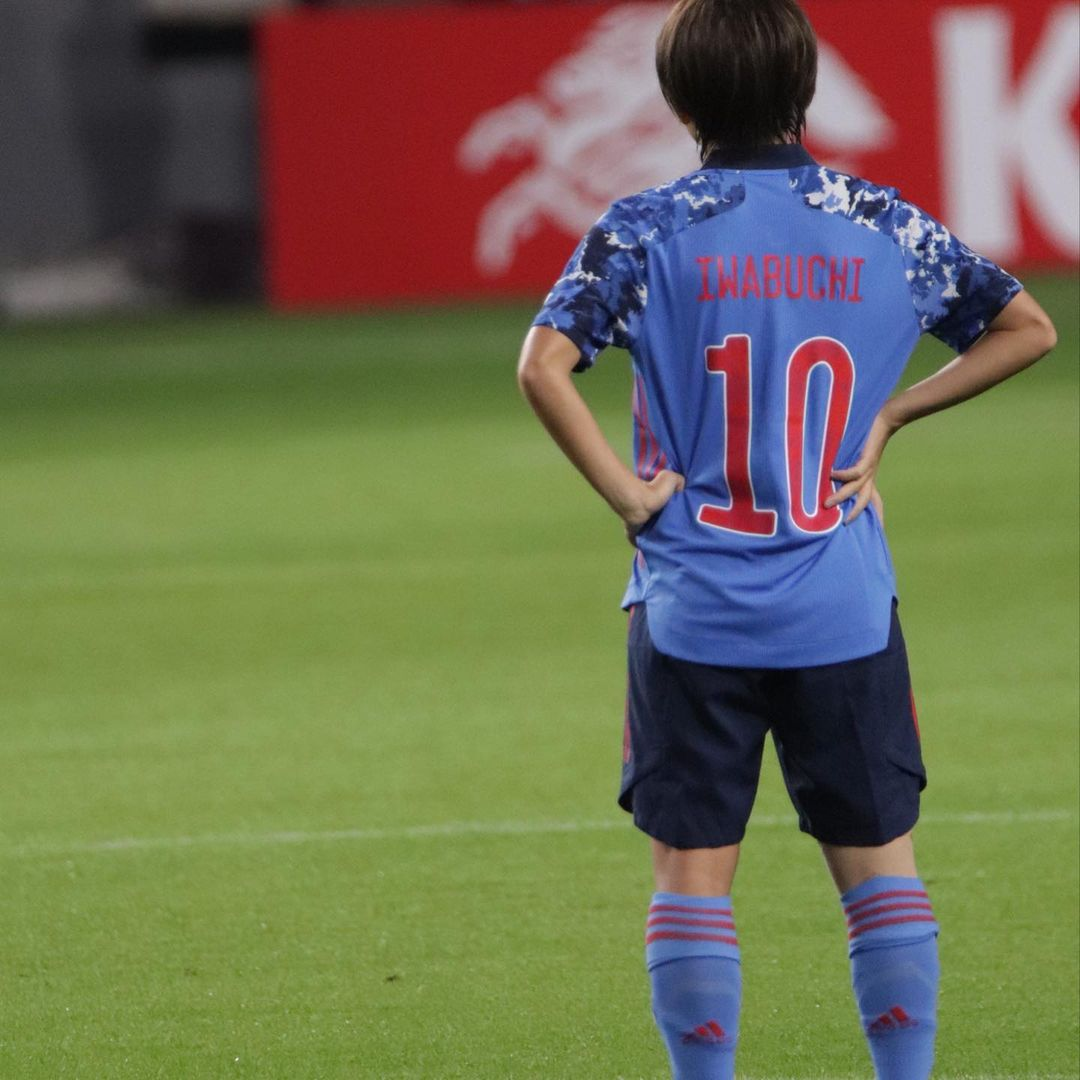
Iwabuchi wears number 10 for Japan, a number famously worn by Nadeshiko legend Homare Sawa

In July 2021, Iwabuchi inherited the number 10 shirt last worn by Japanese legend Homare Sawa, for the 2020 Summer Olympics held in Japan on home soil.

In the opening game of the group stages, held on 21 July 2021 at the Sapporo Dome in Hokkaido, Iwabuchi scored a dramatic late equaliser as Japan held Canada to a 1–1 draw. Latching onto a long ball and finishing with an impressive first-touch strike from the edge of the penalty area, this goal meant that Iwabuchi had scored for the Japan national team in five consecutive international matches, breaking the record previously held by Homare Sawa and the head coach at the time, Asako Takakura. Japan was eliminated from the competition in the quarter-final, where they lost 3–1 to eventual silver medalists Sweden.

Post-Olympics, Iwabuchi was asked about her thoughts on the current state of the Japan women's national team. She replied matter-of-factly, "this is a world where results matter more than anything. It is a pity, but I think that we did everything we could. After all, to be victorious in the world, everyone must be hungry, and aim for an environment to better themselves. Otherwise, we can't win. And for the women's football scene to develop further in Japan, the national team must be strong and produce results."

In line with her comments above, Iwabuchi has long advocated for more Japanese players to take up the challenge of playing overseas. She gave an in-depth interview sharing how her own experiences of moving abroad at an early age were invaluable to her development as a footballer, the differences in styles between Japanese football and European football, and the advice she gives younger players who may be considering their options for the future.

Speaking of her own challenge of playing overseas for a second time, she said, "When I moved to Germany, I was only thinking about my own experiences. Rather, it was as if I went there because I wanted to. I was young, and it was my first time living alone, let alone abroad." She said, "But this time [in England], I have no doubts at all. Ji So-Yun (formerly of INAC Kobe Leonessa where Iwabuchi played) from the South Korean national team also plays for Chelsea. Due to her success at the club, several Korean players are in the English league now. I would like to become someone who leads the way for the Japanese, and if I can show them that playing football in England is fun, our younger players will be encouraged to take the plunge, and it will also be easier for Japanese players to be more highly regarded. That is one of my goals that I want to achieve."

As of February 2022, she has played 85 games and scored 37 goals, making her Japan's sixth-highest goalscorer.

== Style of play ==
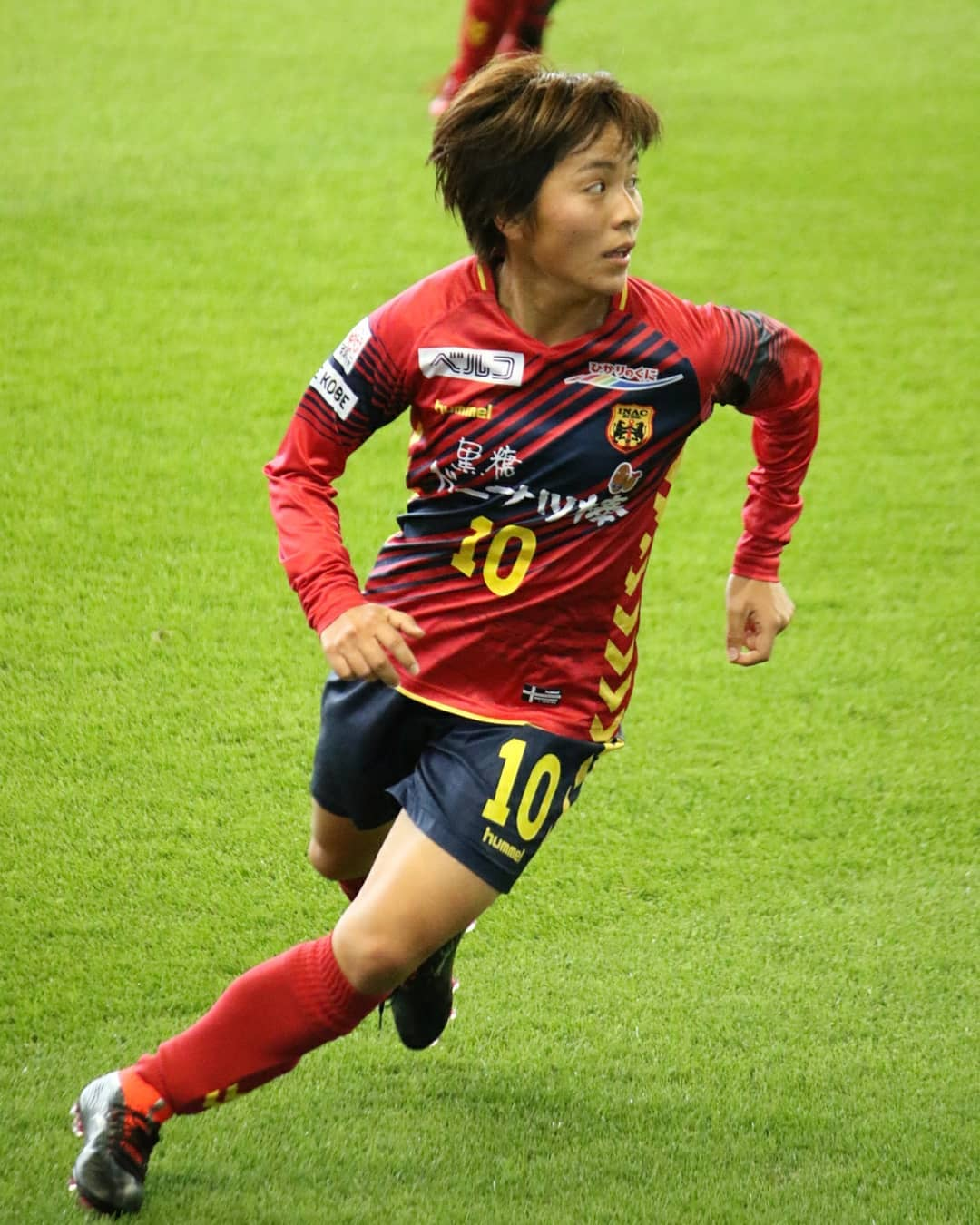
Iwabuchi is known to drop deep, link-up with midfielders, orchestrate attacking plays, and create goal-scoring opportunities.

A versatile player, Iwabuchi plays as a midfielder or forward, and has been deployed in a variety of attacking roles – as an attacking midfielder, second striker, centre forward and on either wing.

The Japan national team usually plays a 4–4–2 formation, and Iwabuchi most often assumes the role of the second striker where she essentially functions in the number 10 role as a playmaking attacking midfielder or deep-lying forward, due to her ball skills and creative ability, which enables her to drop deep between the lines and link-up play, and operate across all attacking areas of the pitch.

In a 4–3–3 or 4–2–3–1 formation, she is often part of the three attacking midfielders behind the central striker where she is given the license to roam freely. Her attacking movement and close control allow her to hold up the ball and create space for teammates; her vision and passing range with both feet, despite being naturally right-footed, subsequently allows her to provide assists for on-running strikers. She has also been deployed on the left-wing due to her quick feet, dribbling ability, and low centre of gravity, which enables her to beat defenders in one on one situations before cutting inside to shoot.

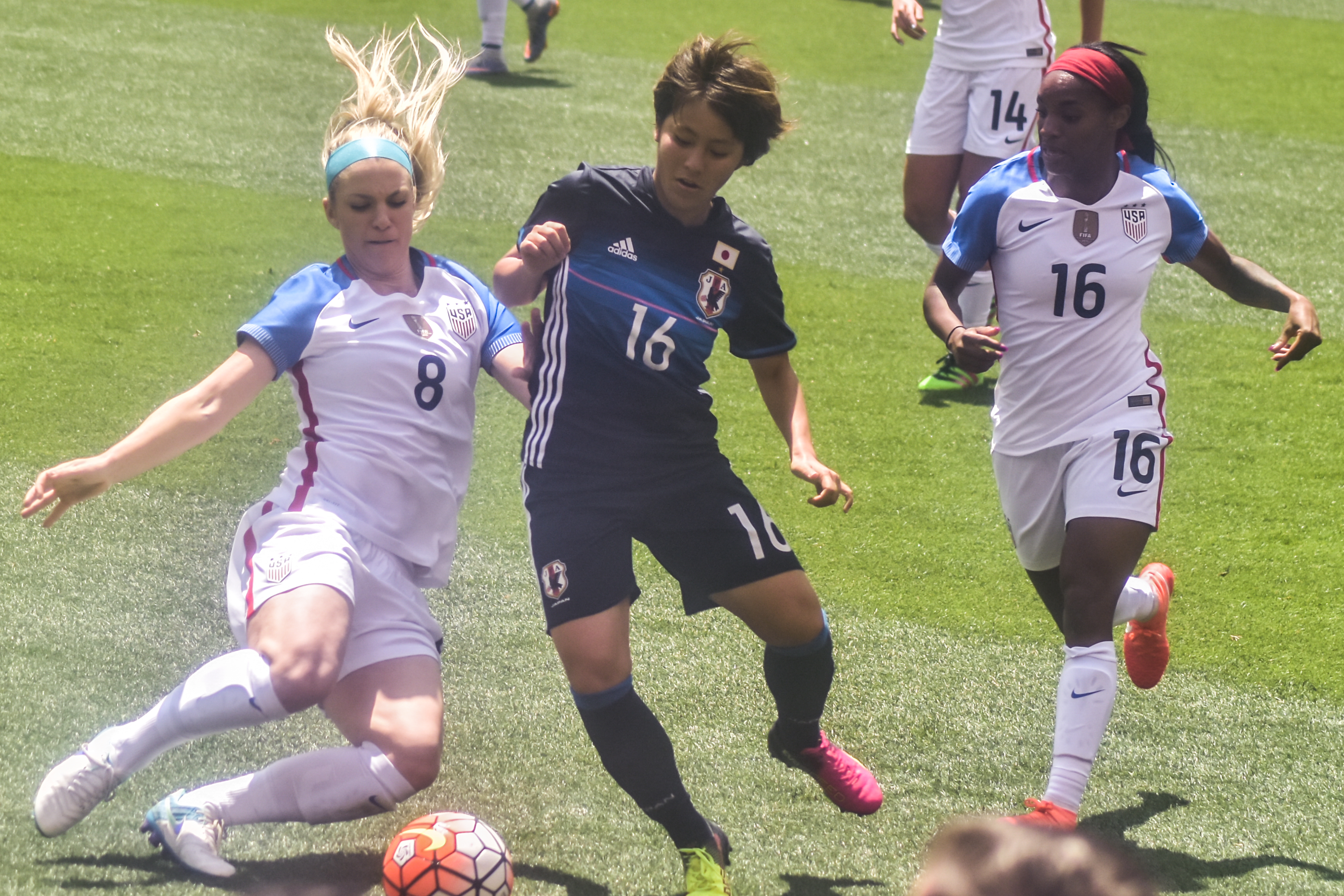
Iwabuchi evades Julie Ertz and Crystal Dunn in a match against the USA

Although she lacks physical strength and height, Iwabuchi has been praised for her finishing – in particular from outside the box –, technique, awareness, capacity to change the rhythm of gameplay in midfield, tactical intelligence, and positioning. She has said herself that she models her game after the Argentine forward Lionel Messi, widely considered to be the best dribbler in the world and one of the greatest dribblers of all time, who has been her idol and role model since she was young. "My dream is to be a player like Messi who can dribble past any opponent, shoot and score from anywhere, and is also amazing at bringing out the best in his teammates," she said.

Due to their similarly small stature and technical ability that enables them to undertake individual dribbling runs towards goal, she was dubbed the "Female Messi" by the Japanese media in her youth. Her distinctive playing style has also drawn comparisons to Argentine legend Diego Maradona and throughout her career she has been affectionately nicknamed 'Manadona' in her home country. Since signing for the club, she has often been likened to former Arsenal player Santi Cazorla by the fans as well as football pundit and club legend Ian Wright.

Beyond her individual qualities, she is also a well-rounded, hard-working team player who covers plenty of ground with her defensive work-rate. During her time under him at Aston Villa, manager Marcus Bignot said of her, "It's unquestioned, her ability on the ball. But I think what goes unnoticed or undervalued, is her work ethic off the ball." He added, "I'm not surprised, knowing Mana and the personality and character she is, that [hard work] just comes natural to her."

During the period of time that she struggled with injuries (2016~17), multiple coaches suggested to her that she change her playing style to one that does not touch the ball so much during a game, thus reducing the stress on her knees. She replied, "I've been told this many times, but I could never do that. If I change the way I play, there will be nothing left and I might as well retire." In the years since, she has strengthened her physical condition by developing the muscles in her legs that can support her movement in the way she wants to play, while reducing the muscle mass in other parts of her body as far as possible.

== Public image ==
She has been outspoken about the development of the women's football scene in Japan, the steps that need to be taken to find success on the world stage once more, and her desire to be a role model for young girls who play football.

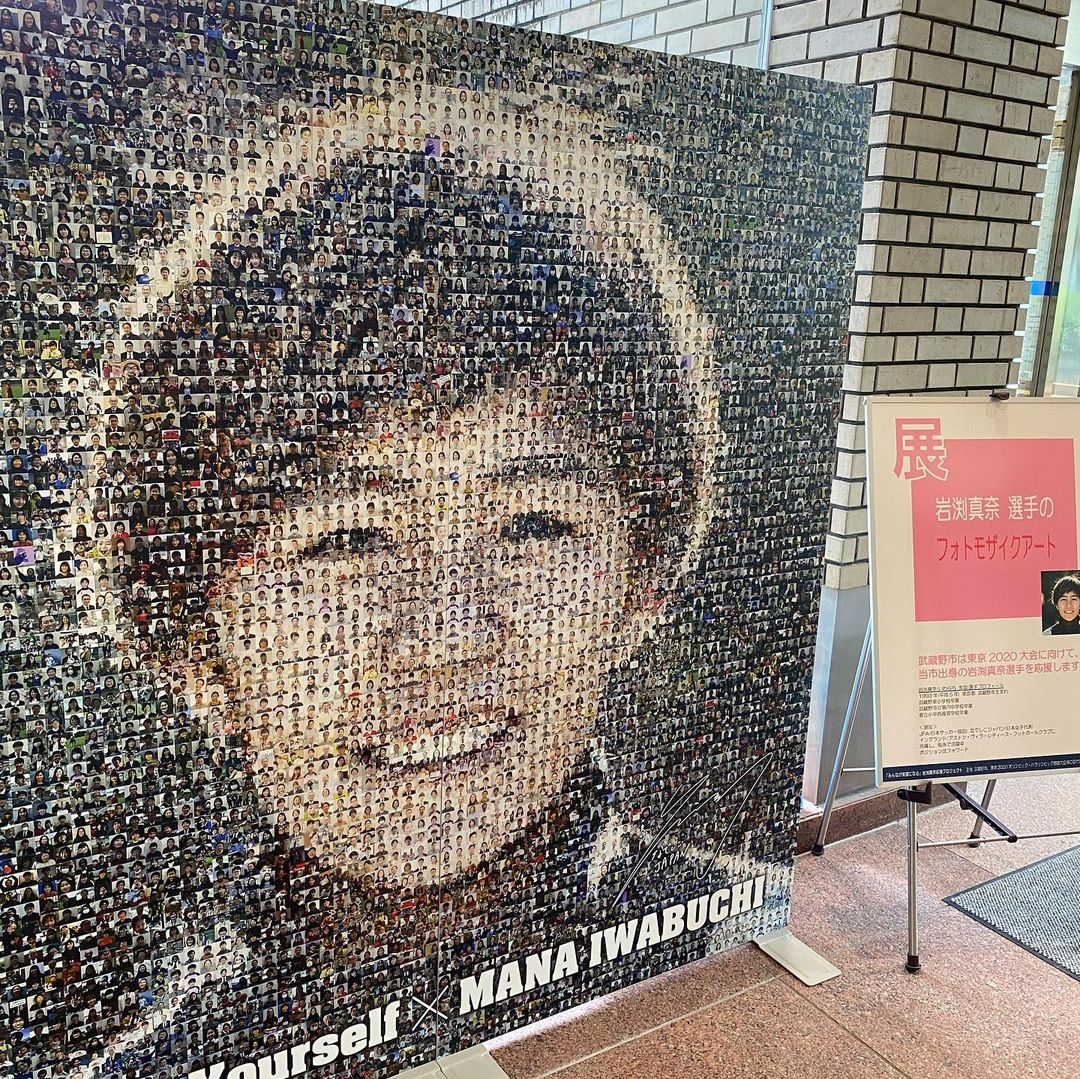
A mosaic portrait of Iwabuchi, made up of over 1000 “smiles” submitted by residents from her hometown of Musashino, Tokyo. The artwork was part of a project created by the city to cheer her on in the 2020 Summer Olympics.

Upon the conclusion of her participation at the Tokyo 2020 Summer Olympics, Iwabuchi started a social media trend with the hashtag #Arigato2020, to express her gratitude to all the volunteers and medical personnel involved in making the Olympics a success. She was the first to upload it on 8 August 2021, and it soon caught on amongst many athletes and medalists within the Japanese contingent. By the end of the entire competition, various athletes from around the world and the official Olympics committee had used the hashtag to show their appreciation for Japan's effort in hosting the Olympics.

Iwabuchi has endorsed sportswear company Adidas since 2018.

== Personal life ==
Iwabuchi has an older brother, Ryota, who is also a professional footballer. As of 2022, he plays for Fujieda MYFC as a midfielder.

She has close friendships with several players from the Japan men's national team, most notably with Takashi Usami as they are the same age and both played for Hoffeinheim in Germany at the same time. He was originally at Bayern Munich before transferring to Hoffenheim, while she played for Hoffenheim first before moving to Bayern Munich later. Iwabuchi also has a close relationship with fellow Arsenal defender and Japan international Takehiro Tomiyasu, as both of them joined the club at the same time in the summer of 2021. When asked, she said “We go for meals together sometimes, he is really super helpful and I like the fact I am able to speak to him in Japanese. It’s easy to talk in your own language and it makes you feel comfortable. We both help each other, we cheer for each other and understand each other more. It’s very helpful to have Tomi here.”

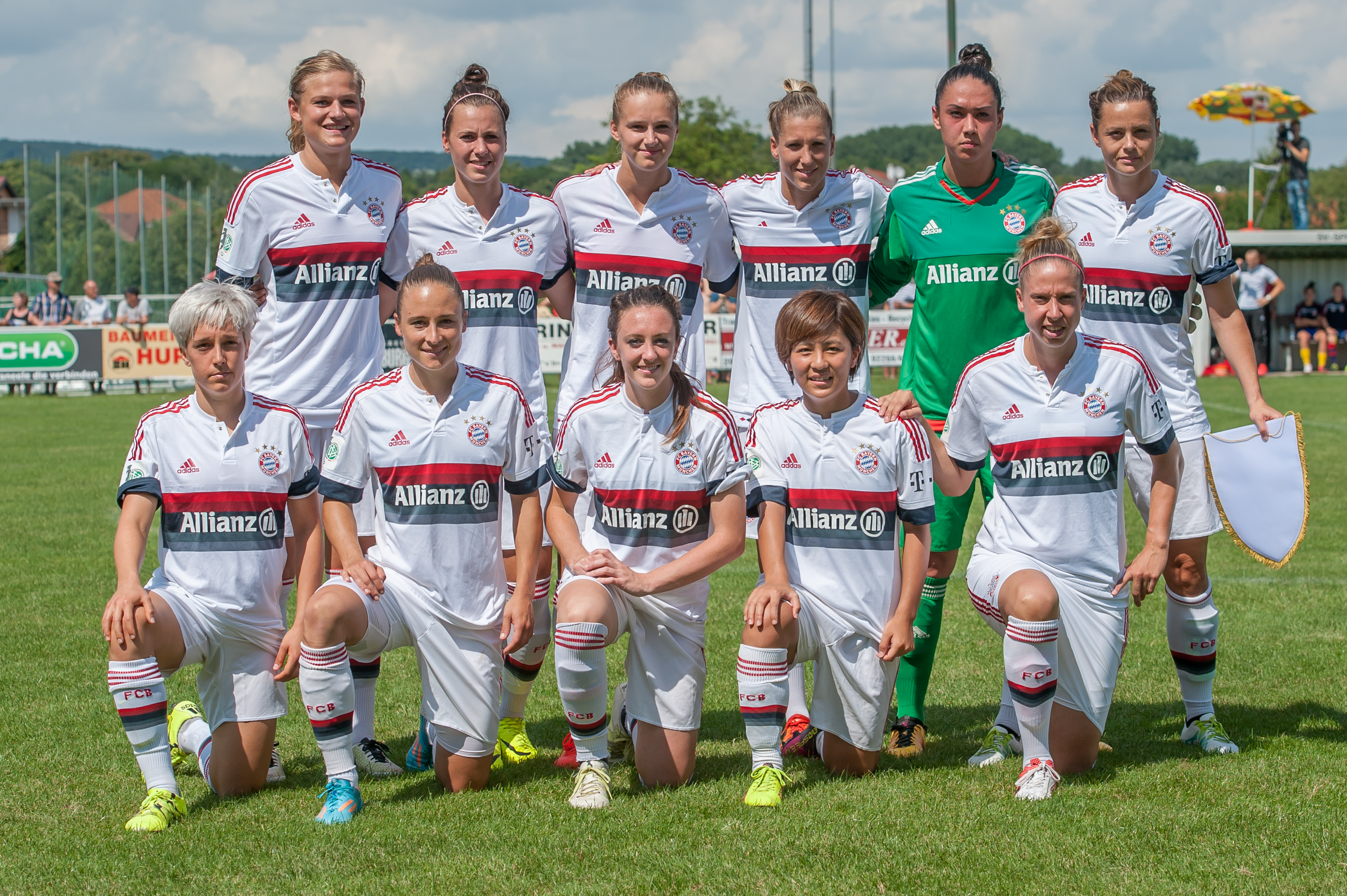
Miedema (second row, third from left) and Iwabuchi (first row, second from right) starting a match together for Bayern Munich in 2016

Iwabuchi's longstanding friendship with fellow Arsenal teammate Vivianne Miedema is well-known, as they were best friends and roommates during their time at Bayern Munich. The two communicate in German even though it is neither of their first languages, as it was the common language they shared when they first met. In her autobiography, she mentioned that Miedema, who had moved to the club several seasons earlier, was influential in her decision to sign for Arsenal. Miedema herself has said, "Mana is one of my best mates off the pitch but she’s also one of the only players in my career where within a session at Bayern that click was there, we just understand each other, we feel each other."

She is an avid dog lover, and has two toy poodles named Coco and Lala who live in her parents' home back in Japan. Her autobiography, entitled Trust yourself, be yourself!, was published by Kadokawa Shoten in June 2021. It contains an account of her life as a professional footballer since the age of 14, her experiences abroad in Germany and England, her changing role in the Japanese national team set-up, and insights into her life off the field.

== Career statistics ==
=== Club ===
As of match played 2 April 2023

Appearances and goals by club, season and competition
Club	Season	League			National cup (Note: Includes Empress's Cup, DFB-Pokal Frauen, Women's FA Cup)		League cup (Note: Includes Nadeshiko League Cup, FA Women's League Cup)		Continental (Note: Includes UEFA Women's Champions League)		Total	
Club	Season	Division	Apps	Goals	Apps	Goals	Apps	Goals	Apps	Goals	Apps	Goals
Nippon TV Beleza	2006	Nadeshiko League	—	—	3	0	—	—	—	—	3	0
Nippon TV Beleza	2007	Nadeshiko League	1	0	3	4	5	3	—	—	9	7
Nippon TV Beleza	2008	Nadeshiko League	7	3	4	2	—	—	—	—	11	5
Nippon TV Beleza	2009	Nadeshiko League	17	5	3	3	—	—	—	—	20	8
Nippon TV Beleza	2010	Nadeshiko League	18	8	1	0	5	2	—	—	24	10
Nippon TV Beleza	2011	Nadeshiko League	13	9	3	1	—	—	—	—	16	10
Nippon TV Beleza	2012	Nadeshiko League	8	5	0	0	0	0	—	—	8	5
Nippon TV Beleza	Total		64	30	17	10	10	5	—	—	91	45
1899 Hoffenheim	2012–13	2. Bundesliga	9	4	—	—	—	—	—	—	9	4
1899 Hoffenheim	2013–14	Bundesliga	21	6	1	0	—	—	—	—	22	6
1899 Hoffenheim	Total		30	11	1	0	—	—	—	—	31	10
Bayern Munich	2014–15	Bundesliga	13	3	1	0	—	—	0	0	14	3
Bayern Munich	2015–16	Bundesliga	8	2	1	0	—	—	0	0	9	2
Bayern Munich	2016–17	Bundesliga	3	0	0	0	—	—	0	0	3	0
Bayern Munich	Total		24	5	2	0	—	—	0	0	26	5
INAC Kobe Leonessa	2017	Nadeshiko League	5	0	2	1	—	—	—	—	7	1
INAC Kobe Leonessa	2018	Nadeshiko League	12	2	5	1	5	0	—	—	22	3
INAC Kobe Leonessa	2019	Nadeshiko League	15	5	4	2	4	1	—	—	23	8
INAC Kobe Leonessa	2020	Nadeshiko League	15	4	0	0	—	—	—	—	15	4
INAC Kobe Leonessa	Total		47	11	11	4	9	1	—	—	67	16
Aston Villa	2020–21	FA WSL	13	2	0	0	1	0	—	—	13	2
Arsenal	2021–22	FA WSL	11	1	1	0	0	0	8	3	23	4
Arsenal	2022–23	WSL	3	0	0	0	0	0	2	1	5	1
Arsenal	Total		14	1	1	0	0	0	10	4	28	6
Tottenham Hotspur (loan)	2022–23	WSL	10	0	2	1	1	0	—	—	13	1
Career total			202	59	34	15	21	6	10	4	267	84

=== International ===
As of match played 11 April 2023

Appearances and goals by national team and year
National team	Year	Apps	Goals
Japan	2010	3	2
Japan	2011	8	0
Japan	2012	4	0
Japan	2013	5	0
Japan	2014	5	1
Japan	2015	5	1
Japan	2016	7	4
Japan	2017	6	3
Japan	2018	18	9
Japan	2019	8	7
Japan	2020	3	2
Japan	2021	10	7
Japan	2022	3	0
Japan	2023	4	0
Total		89	36

Scores and results list Japan's goal tally first, score column indicates score after each Iwabuchi goal.

List of international goals scored by Mana Iwabuchi
No.	Date	Venue	Opponent	Score	Result	Competition	Ref.
1	11 February 2010	National Stadium (Tokyo)	Chinese Taipei	1–0	3–0	2010 EAFF Women's Football Championship	
2	11 February 2010	National Stadium (Tokyo)	Chinese Taipei	2–0	3–0	2010 EAFF Women's Football Championship	
3	7 March 2014	Estádio Municipal Da Bela Vista	Denmark	1–0	1–0	2014 Algarve Cup	
4	27 June 2015	Commonwealth Stadium (Edmonton)	Australia	1–0	1–0	2015 FIFA Women's World Cup	
5	2 March 2016	Kincho Stadium	South Korea	1–0	1–1	2016 AFC Women's Olympic Qualifying Tournament	
6	7 March 2016	Kincho Stadium	Vietnam	1–0	6–1	2016 AFC Women's Olympic Qualifying Tournament	
7	9 March 2016	Kincho Stadium	North Korea	1–0	1–0	2016 AFC Women's Olympic Qualifying Tournament	
8	2 June 2016	Dick's Sporting Goods Park	United States	1–0	3–3	Friendly	
9	24 November 2017	King Abdullah II Stadium	Jordan	1–0	2–0	Friendly	
10	24 November 2017	King Abdullah II Stadium	Jordan	2–0	2–0	Friendly	
11	8 December 2017	Chiba Soga Football Stadium	South Korea	3–2	3–2	2017 EAFF E-1 Football Championship (women)	
12	28 February 2018	Estádio Municipal Da Bela Vista	Netherlands	2–6	2–6	2018 Algarve Cup	
13	5 March 2018	Estádio Algarve	Denmark	2–0	2–0	2018 Algarve Cup	
14	1 April 2018	Transcosmos Stadium Nagasaki	Ghana	2–1	7–1	Friendly	
15	7 April 2018	King Abdullah II Stadium	Vietnam	3–0	4–0	2018 AFC Women's Asian Cup	
16	17 April 2018	King Abdullah II Stadium	China	1–0	3–1	2018 AFC Women's Asian Cup	
17	16 August 2018	Bumi Sriwijaya Stadium, Palembang	Thailand	1–0	2–0	2018 Asian Games	
18	25 August 2018	Gelora Sriwijaya Stadium, Palembang	North Korea	1–0	2–1	2018 Asian Games	
19	11 November 2018	Tottori Bank Bird Stadium	Norway	2–0	4–1	Friendly	
20	11 November 2018	Tottori Bank Bird Stadium	Norway	3–0	4–1	Friendly	
21	14 June 2019	Roazhon Park, Rennes	Scotland	1–0	2–1	2019 FIFA Women's World Cup	
22	6 October 2019	IAI Stadium Nihondaira	Canada	1–0	4–0	Friendly	
23	11 December 2019	Busan Asiad Main Stadium	Chinese Taipei	1–0	9–0	2019 EAFF E-1 Football Championship	
24	11 December 2019	Busan Asiad Main Stadium	Chinese Taipei	8–0	9–0	2019 EAFF E-1 Football Championship	
25	14 December 2019	Busan Gudeok Stadium	China	1–0	3–0	2019 EAFF E-1 Football Championship	
26	14 December 2019	Busan Gudeok Stadium	China	2–0	3–0	2019 EAFF E-1 Football Championship	
27	14 December 2019	Busan Gudeok Stadium	China	3–0	3–0	2019 EAFF E-1 Football Championship	
28	5 March 2020	Exploria Stadium, Orlando	Spain	1–1	1–3	2020 SheBelieves Cup	
29	11 March 2020	Toyota Stadium, Frisco	United States	1–2	1–3	2020 SheBelieves Cup	
30	8 April 2021	Yurtec Stadium, Sendai	Paraguay	2–0	7–0	Friendly	
31	8 April 2021	Yurtec Stadium, Sendai	Paraguay	5–0	7–0	Friendly	
32	10 June 2021	Edion Stadium, Hiroshima	Ukraine	2–0	8–0	Friendly	
33	10 June 2021	Edion Stadium, Hiroshima	Ukraine	5–0	8–0	Friendly	
34	13 June 2021	Kanseki Stadium, Tochigi	Mexico	1–0	5–1	Friendly	
35	14 July 2021	Sanga Stadium, Kyoto	Australia	1–0	1–0	2021 MS&AD CUP	
36	21 July 2021	Sapporo Dome, Hokkaido	Canada	1–1	1–1	2020 Summer Olympics	

== Honours ==
Nippon TV Beleza

- Nadeshiko League: 2007, 2008, 2010
- Nadeshiko League Cup: 2007, 2010, 2012
- Empress's Cup: 2008, 2009

Hoffenheim

- 2. Frauen-Bundesliga: 2012–13

Bayern Munich

- Frauen-Bundesliga: 2014–15, 2015–16

Japan U19

- AFC U-19 Women's Championship: 2009

Japan

- EAFF Women's Football Championship: 2010, 2019
- FIFA Women's World Cup: 2011
- Olympic Silver Medal: 2012
- AFC Women's Asian Cup: 2018
- Asian Games: 2018

Individual

- Nadeshiko League Best Young Player: 2008
- Nadeshiko League Cup MVP: 2010
- Nadeshiko League Most Hardworking Player: 2011
- Nadeshiko League Best Eleven: 2011
- Asian Young Footballer of the Year: 2008, 2009
- FIFA U-17 Women's World Cup Golden Ball: 2008
- AFC U-19 Women's Championship MVP: 2009
- AFC U-19 Women's Championship Golden Boot: 2009
- FIFA World Player of the Year Nominee: 2009
- EAFF Women's Football Championship Golden Boot: 2010, 2019
- AFC Women's Asian Cup MVP: 2018
- IFFHS AFC Woman Team of the Decade 2011–2020
