= Daniela Löwenberg =

German footballer

Personal information
- Full name: Daniela Löwenberg
- Date of birth: 11 January 1988 (age 38)
- Place of birth: Dortmund, West Germany
- Height: 1.68 m (5 ft 6 in)
- Position: Midfielder

Youth career
- 1992–1998: FC Merkur Dortmund
- 1998–2003: TuS Eving-Lindenhorst
- 2003–2005: SG Wattenscheid 09

Senior career*
Years	Team	Apps	(Gls)
2005–2008	SG Wattenscheid 09	61	(11)
2008–2010	SG Essen-Schönebeck	40	(3)
2010–2012	1. FFC Turbine Potsdam	15	(1)
2011–2012	→ 1. FFC Turbine Potsdam II	13	(1)
2012–	BV Cloppenburg	129	(4)

International career^{‡}
2006–2007	Germany U19	8	(0)
2006	Germany U21	1	(0)
2008–2010	Germany U23	9	(0)
- * Club domestic league appearances and goals as of 1 August 2019 ‡ National team caps and goals as of 26 May 2010

Daniela Löwenberg (born 11 January 1988) is a German football midfielder, who plays for BV Cloppenburg.

== Club career ==
=== Club statistics ===
As of 1 August 2019

Club	Season	League			Cup		League Cup		Continental		Total	
Club	Season	Division	Apps	Goals	Apps	Goals	Apps	Goals	Apps	Goals	Apps	Goals
SG Wattenscheid 09	2005–06	2. Bundesliga	19	1			—		—			
SG Wattenscheid 09	2006–07	2. Bundesliga	21	9			—		—			
SG Wattenscheid 09	2007–08	Bundesliga	21	1			0 (Note: Appearances in the 2007 Bundesliga Cup.)	0	—			
SG Wattenscheid 09	Total		61	11			0	0	0	0		
SG Essen-Schönebeck	2008–09	Bundesliga	20	1			—		—			
SG Essen-Schönebeck	2009–10	Bundesliga	20	2	2	0	—		—		22	2
SG Essen-Schönebeck	Total		40	3			0	0	0	0		
1. FFC Turbine Potsdam	2010–11	Bundesliga	15	1	3	1	—		3 (Note: Appearances in the 2010–11 UEFA Women's Champions League.)	0	21	2
1. FFC Turbine Potsdam	2011–12	Bundesliga	0	0	0	0	6 (Note: Appearances in the 2011 Bundesliga Cup.)	0	0 (Note: Appearances in the 2011–12 UEFA Women's Champions League.)	0	6	0
1. FFC Turbine Potsdam	Total		15	1	3	1	6	0	3	0	27	2
1. FFC Turbine Potsdam II	2011–12	2. Bundesliga	13	1	—		—		—		13	1
1. FFC Turbine Potsdam II	Total		13	1	0	0	0	0	0	0	13	1
BV Cloppenburg	2012–13	2. Bundesliga	16	0	1	0	—		—		17	0
BV Cloppenburg	2013–14	Bundesliga	20	1	4	0	—		—		24	1
BV Cloppenburg	2014–15	2. Bundesliga	22	0	3	0	—		—		25	0
BV Cloppenburg	2015–16	2. Bundesliga	21	1	2	0	—		—		23	1
BV Cloppenburg	2016–17	2. Bundesliga	22	1	2	0	—		—		24	1
BV Cloppenburg	2017–18	2. Bundesliga	22	1	3	0	—		—		25	1
BV Cloppenburg	2018–19	2. Bundesliga	6	0	0	0	—		—		6	0
BV Cloppenburg	2019–20	2. Bundesliga	0	0	0	0	—		—		0	0
BV Cloppenburg	Total		129	4	15	0	0	0	0	0	144	4
Career total			257	20			6	0	3	0		

== International career ==
Löwenberg was a member of the German U-19 national team that won the 2006 and 2007 Under-19 European Championships.
