= Bárbara (footballer) =

Brazilian footballer (born 1988)

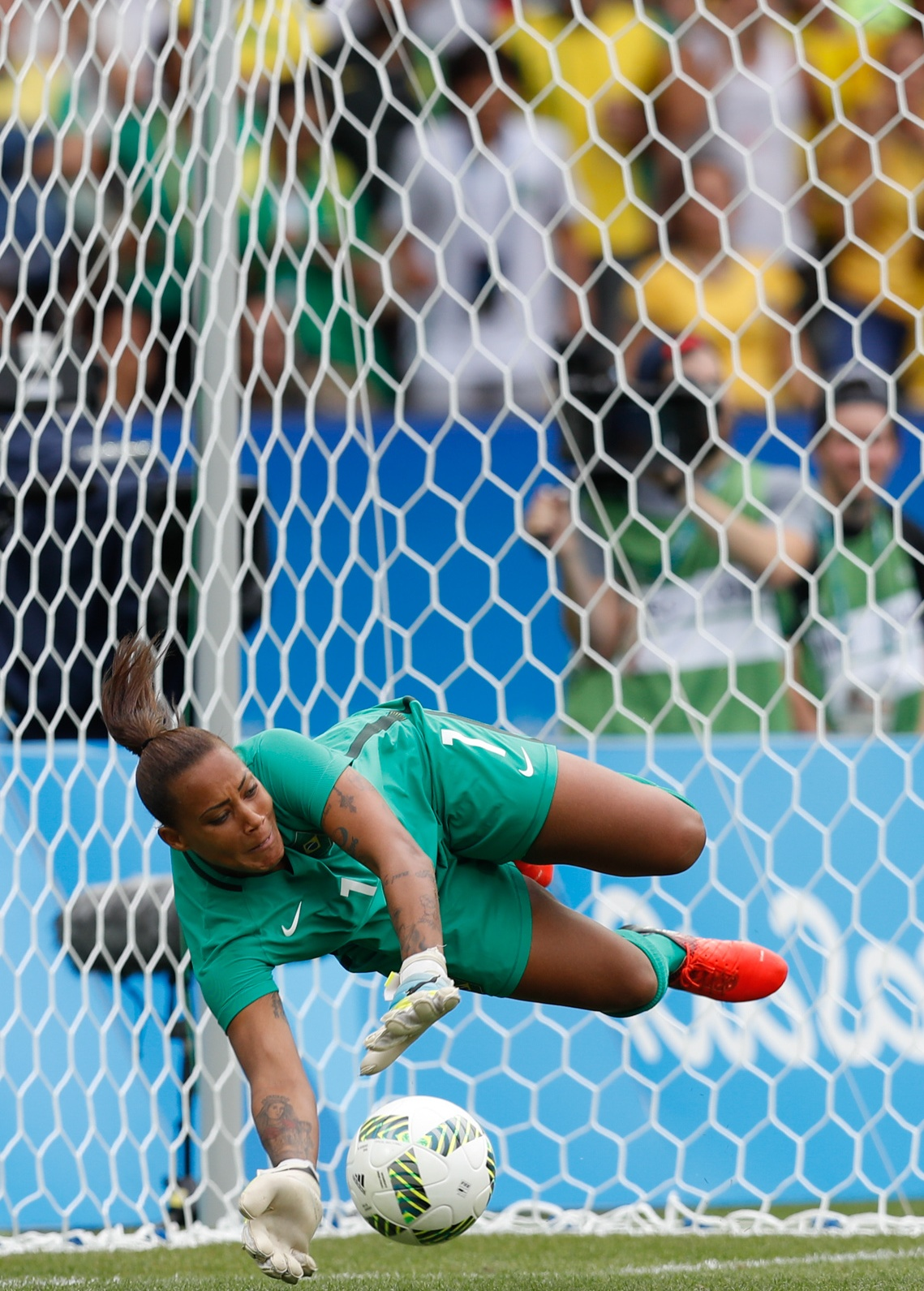
- Bárbara with Brazil in 2016

Personal information
- Full name: Bárbara Micheline do Monte Barbosa
- Date of birth: 4 July 1988 (age 38)
- Place of birth: Recife, Brazil
- Height: 1.71 m (5 ft 7 in)
- Position: Goalkeeper

Team information
- Current team: Internacional
- Number: 88

Senior career*
Years	Team	Apps	(Gls)
- Sport
2008	Santa Cruz		
2008	Napoli		
2009–2010	Sunnanå	36	(0)
2011	Sport		
2011–2012	Foz Cataratas		
2013	São Caetano		
2014	BV Cloppenburg	4	(0)
2014	Kindermann	13	(0)
2015	Botafogo	3	(0)
2016	Foz Cataratas	5	(0)
2017–2022	Kindermann	76	(0)
2023–2024	Flamengo	15	(0)
2024	Melbourne City	7	(0)
2024-	Internacional	2	(0)

International career^{‡}
2007–	Brazil	69	(0)
Medal record
Women's football
Representing Brazil
FIFA Women's World Cup
Silver medal – second place	2007 China	Team
Olympic Games
Silver medal – second place	2008 Beijing	Team
Pan American Games
Gold medal – first place	2007 Rio de Janeiro	Team
Silver medal – second place	2011 Guadalajara	Team
Gold medal – first place	2015 Toronto	Team
- * Club domestic league appearances and goals as of 27 May 2024 ‡ National team caps and goals as of 20 June 2023

Bárbara Micheline do Monte Barbosa (born 4 July 1988), commonly known as Bárbara, is a Brazilian professional footballer who plays as a goalkeeper for Internacional and the Brazil women's national team. She has played for clubs in Italy, Sweden and Germany, as well as in her native country, Brazil. Since making her national team debut in 2007, she has won over 30 caps for Brazil. She has been part of her country's squad at four editions of the FIFA Women's World Cup and at two Olympic football tournaments.

== Club career ==
In autumn 2008, Bárbara joined Italian club Napoli. She moved to the Swedish Damallsvenskan team Sunnanå SK in early 2009 and remained for two seasons until the club was relegated at the end of the 2010 campaign. She rejected offers from other Swedish teams to return to the women's section of Sport Club do Recife, where her career began. Bárbara played four league matches for Frauen-Bundesliga club BV Cloppenburg in the 2013–14 season.

In February 2024, Bárbara joined Australian club Melbourne City until the end of the 2023–24 A-League Women season and made her debut in a 2–0 loss against Brisbane Roar on 2 March 2024. She left the club at the end of the season on conclusion of her contract.

== International career ==
At the 2006 FIFA U-20 Women's World Championship, FIFA.com reported that Bárbara's goalkeeping was a "key factor" in the Brazilian team, which finished third. In September 2007 Bárbara made her senior international debut in Brazil's 2–1 friendly defeat by Japan at Fukuda Denshi Arena, Chiba. She was called into Brazil's squad for the 2007 Pan American Games, where she understudied veteran Andréia Suntaque.

Bárbara was Brazil's first-choice goalkeeper at the 2008 Beijing Olympics. She won a silver medal when Brazil lost the final 1–0 after extra time to the United States. After the final, Bárbara gave an insight into Brazilian women's football's lack of development when she revealed her club had not paid her for six months.

Bárbara was part of the Brazilian World Cup squads in 2011, 2015, 2019 and 2023.

== Personal life ==
Bárbara is openly lesbian, having a relationship with her partner Lidiane.
