= Thomas Täglichsbeck =

German violinist and composer

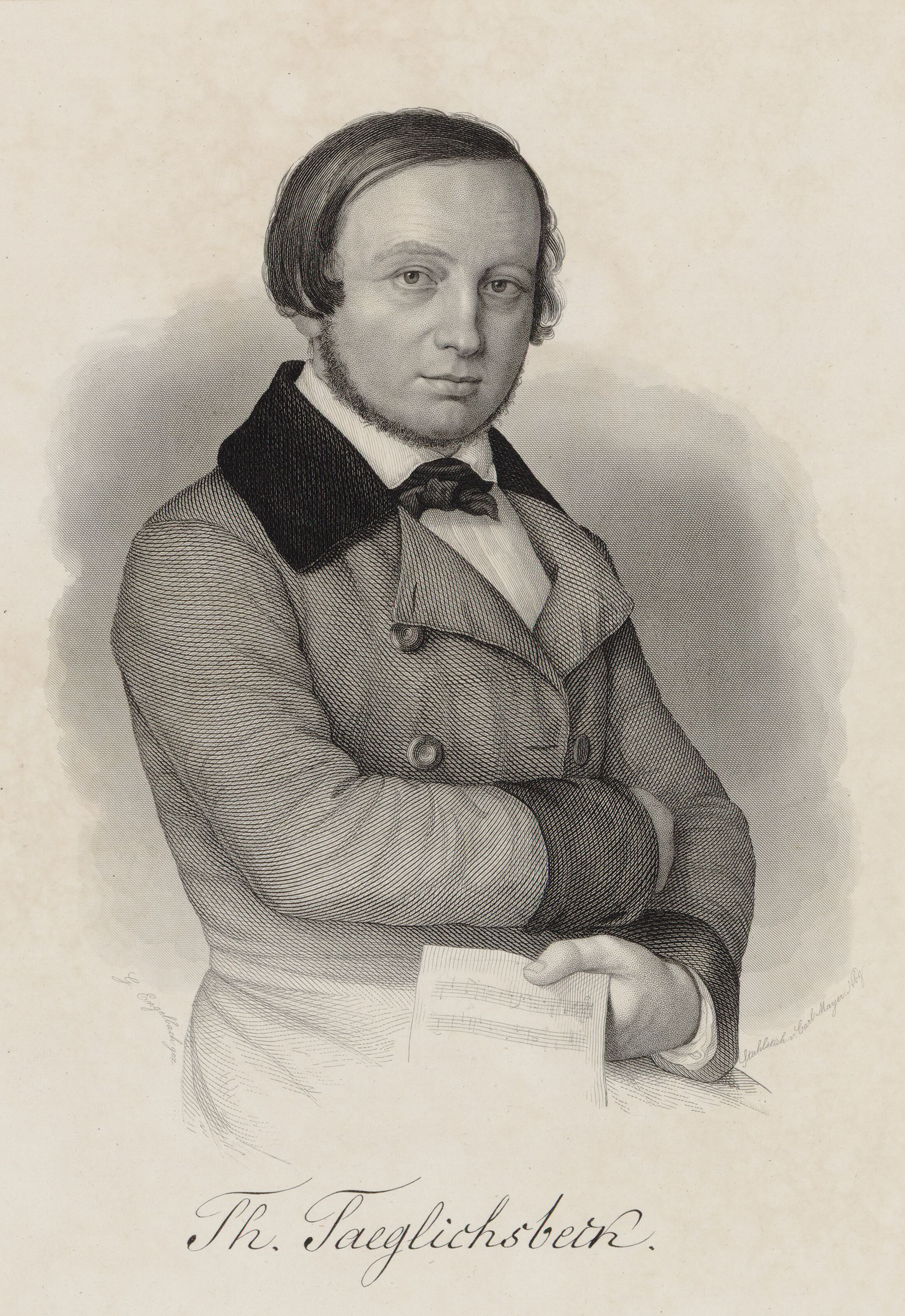
Thomas Täglichsbeck

Thomas Täglichsbeck (31 December 1799 – 5 October 1867) was a German violinist and composer.

Täglichsbeck was born in Ansbach. His family settled in the region of the Vogtland between Bavaria, Thuringia and Saxony, in 1800. Following violin lessons from his father, Johann Täglichsbeck, young Thomas moved to Munich where he studied with Pietro Rovelli. In 1817 a mass of his, written under the supervision of Josef Gratz, was performed in Munich. That same year, Täglichsbeck became a violinist in the Isarthortheater orchestra. Two years later, at the age of 20, he succeeded Lindpaintner as music director, making him one of the youngest conductors of the theater orchestra in Lower Saxony. In 1822 he became a solo violinist at the Munich court, which had the added advantage of freeing up his time to work on composing. On 24 August 1823 his first opera, Webers Bild, premiered at the court theater. His variations on La gazza ladra also date from this period. In 1824 he made an extensive tour of Germany, Switzerland and northern Italy; he joined the Società Filarmonica of Bergamo, where Rovelli then lived. Reviews of his concerts in the Allgemeine musikalische Zeitung (1825–32) are laudatory, although his playing in Munich in 1832 was described as ‘more charming than exceptional’.

In 1827 Täglichsbeck became the Kapellmeister to Prince Hohenzollern-Hechingen. Under Prince Friedrich Wilhelm Konstantin (1838–48) the court became a well-known musical centre which was visited by Berlioz (1842) and Liszt (1848). When political changes in 1848 eliminated the principality, Täglichsbeck was pensioned and the musicians were given paid leave. Constantine recalled Täglichsbeck from Stuttgart in 1852 and reconstituted his orchestra at Löwenberg. Five years later Täglichsbeck was pensioned and succeeded by Max Seyfriz. He subsequently taught composition at the Dresden Conservatory for two years, then lived for a while in Munich before retiring to Baden-Baden in 1866. He died in Baden-Baden a year later, aged 67.

The climax of Täglichsbeck's career as a composer came with the performance of his Symphony no. 1 in E at the Paris Conservatoire in 1836. It was a popular success, though Berlioz dismissed it as ‘academic music, and nothing more’; reviewing a performance a year later, Berlioz wrote more graciously: ‘works of this kind gain 100% on rehearing’. The opera König Enzio, produced in Karlsruhe in 1843, did not establish itself in the repertory. Täglichsbeck was an excellent Kapellmeister, a good if not brilliant violinist and a skilled if not very original composer.

== Sources ==
- Albert Mell. The New Grove Dictionary of Opera, edited by Stanley Sadie (1992). ISBN 0-333-73432-7 and ISBN 1-56159-228-5
