= Jalila Dalaf =

Syrian footballer (born 1993)

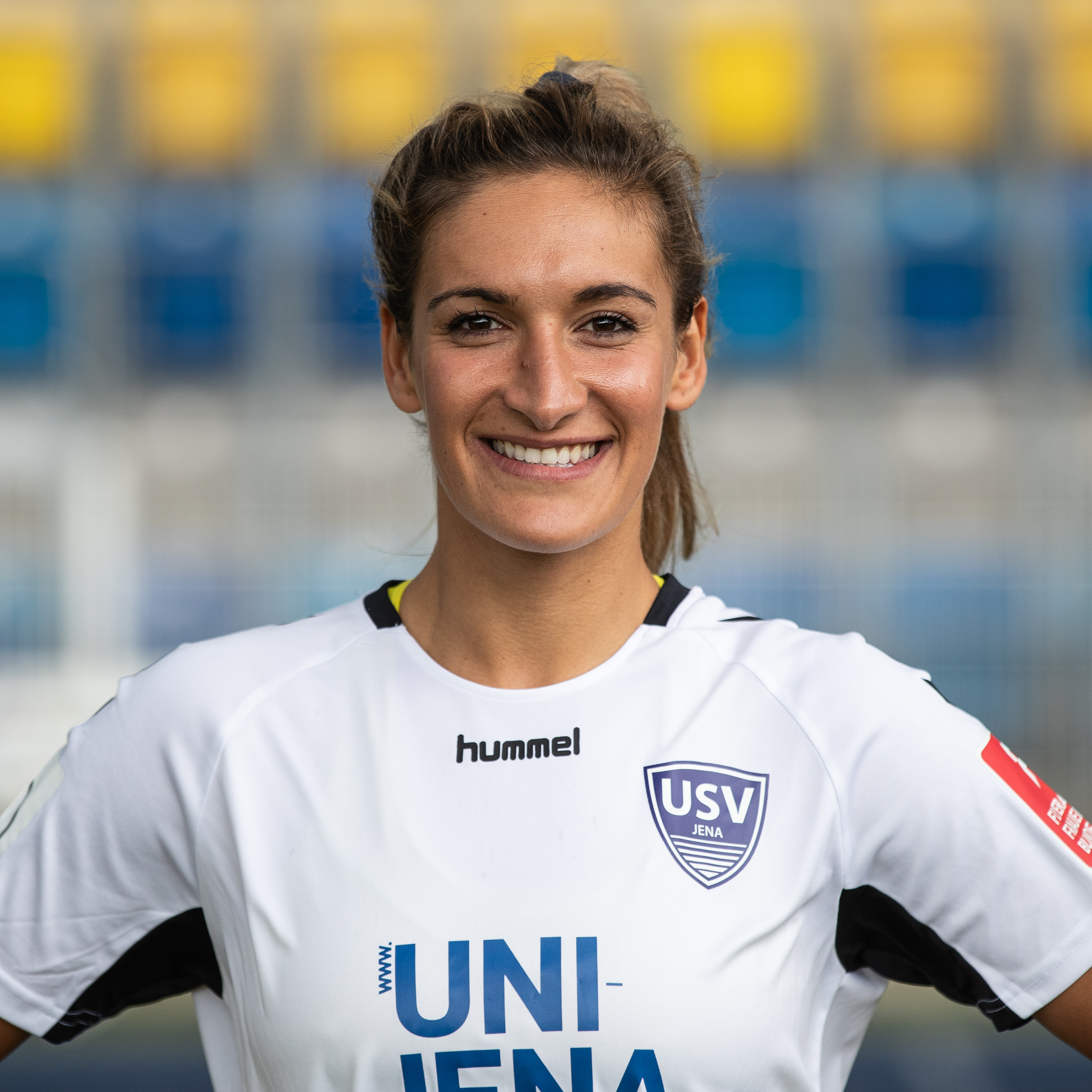
- Dalaf with FF USV Jena in 2019

Personal information
- Date of birth: 7 March 1993 (age 33)
- Place of birth: Kazlaik, Syria
- Height: 1.67 m (5 ft 6 in)
- Positions: Midfielder; forward

Youth career
- 2001–2004: VfB Peine
- 2004–2005: VfL Giften
- 2005–2006: PSV Hildesheim
- 2006–2008: Mellendorfer TV
- 2008–2010: 1. FFC Turbine Potsdam

Senior career*
Years	Team	Apps	(Gls)
2010–2011	1. FFC Turbine Potsdam II	19	(5)
2011–2012	1. FC Köln	13	(3)
2011	1. FC Köln II	1	(0)
2013	SC 07 Bad Neuenahr II		
2013–2014	Bayer 04 Leverkusen II		
2014–2015	VfL Wolfsburg II	14	(2)
2015–2017	BV Cloppenburg	43	(17)
2017–2019	SV Meppen	48	(30)
2019	FF USV Jena	5	(0)
2020	SV Meppen	1	(1)
2020	1. FC Sarstedt		
- * Club domestic league appearances and goals

Jalila Dalaf (Arabic: جليلة دلاف; Kurdish: Celîla Delaf; born 7 March 1993) is a Syrian former footballer who played as a midfielder or forward.

== Early life ==
Dalaf was born in Kazlaik, Syria, to a Kurdish family from the area near Kobani, close to the Syria–Turkey border. In 1994, her family moved to Germany, where they initially stayed in an accommodation centre before living in several different places. Dalaf grew up in Sarstedt, near Hildesheim.

== Career ==
=== Youth career ===
Dalaf began playing football at the age of eight, secretly obtaining the telephone number of the coach of VfB Peine and asking to join the team. She did not initially tell her parents that she was playing football. After her father saw a newspaper report identifying her as the top scorer of the club's under-10 team, he became supportive and bought her her first football boots.

She subsequently played for VfL Giften, PSV Grün-Weiß Hildesheim and Mellendorfer TV. In 2006, while with PSV Hildesheim, she represented the Lower Saxony Football Association under-13 selection at a northern German scouting tournament, scoring in victories over Bremen and Hamburg as Lower Saxony won the tournament. In 2007, she was part of the Mellendorfer TV team at the German B-junior championship.

At the age of 14, a coach at PSV Hildesheim took Dalaf to the sports school of 1. FFC Turbine Potsdam, where she impressed during a trial. She subsequently transferred to Potsdam and joined the club's under-17 team in 2008.

=== Turbine Potsdam and Köln ===
Dalaf made her senior debut for 1. FFC Turbine Potsdam II on 22 August 2010, playing the full 90 minutes in a 4–0 home victory over league newcomers BV Cloppenburg on the second matchday of the 2. Bundesliga. She scored her first senior goal on 5 September 2010, scoring in the 48th minute to give Potsdam a 3–2 lead in a 3–3 home draw against SV Meppen. She made 19 appearances and scored five goals in the northern division of the then second-tier 2. Bundesliga.

In the 2011–12 season, Dalaf played for 1. FC Köln, making 13 appearances and scoring three goals in the southern division of the 2. Bundesliga. She also made one appearance for the club's second team in the Regionalliga West.

=== Bad Neuenahr, Leverkusen, Wolfsburg, Cloppenburg and Meppen ===
After five months without a club, Dalaf joined SC 07 Bad Neuenahr in January 2013, playing in the 2. Bundesliga South until June. She subsequently spent one season each with Bayer 04 Leverkusen in the Regionalliga West and VfL Wolfsburg in the 2. Bundesliga North.

Following another six months without a club, Dalaf joined BV Cloppenburg and subsequently SV Meppen, spending two seasons with each club in the 2. Bundesliga and scoring at least ten goals in a season for both clubs. With 15 goals in 21 league appearances for Meppen in the 2017–18 season, she was the club's leading scorer and the second-highest scorer in the league. In the 2018–19 season, she scored 14 goals in 26 league appearances, again finishing as Meppen's leading scorer and third-highest scorer in the league.

=== Jena and return to Meppen ===
On 15 June 2019, Dalaf's move to FF USV Jena was announced. She made her Bundesliga debut with the club on 17 August 2019, playing the full match in a 6–1 home defeat to TSG 1899 Hoffenheim. She made five league appearances for Jena during the season. Due to persistent injuries and an important examination as part of her vocational training, she left the club during the winter break.

Dalaf returned to Meppen for the second half of the 2019–20 season. She made her only appearance of the season in a 3–1 away victory over league newcomers SG 99 Andernach; the season was subsequently curtailed due to the COVID-19 pandemic in Germany. She was briefly registered with 1. FC Sarstedt from September 2020 after the club's promotion to the Bezirksliga.
