= 2018–19 2. Frauen-Bundesliga =

2. Frauen-Bundesliga
- Season: 2018–19
- Dates: 18 August 2018 – 19 May 2019
- Champions: Bayern Munich II
- Promoted: 1. FC Köln; USV Jena
- Relegated: Hessen Wetzlar; SV Weinberg; SGS Essen II
- Matches played: 182
- Goals scored: 599 (3.29 per match)
- Top goalscorer: Julia Matuschewski (20 goals)
- Biggest home win: Jena 6–0 Weinberg; Köln 6–0 Cloppenburg
- Biggest away win: Weinberg 0–6 Hoffenheim II; Essen II 0–6 Munich II
- Highest scoring: Potsdam 5–4 Köln; Saarbrücken 7–2 Weinberg
- Attendance: 26,372 (145 per match)

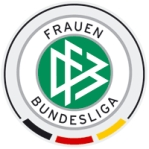
Fussball Bundesliga (women)

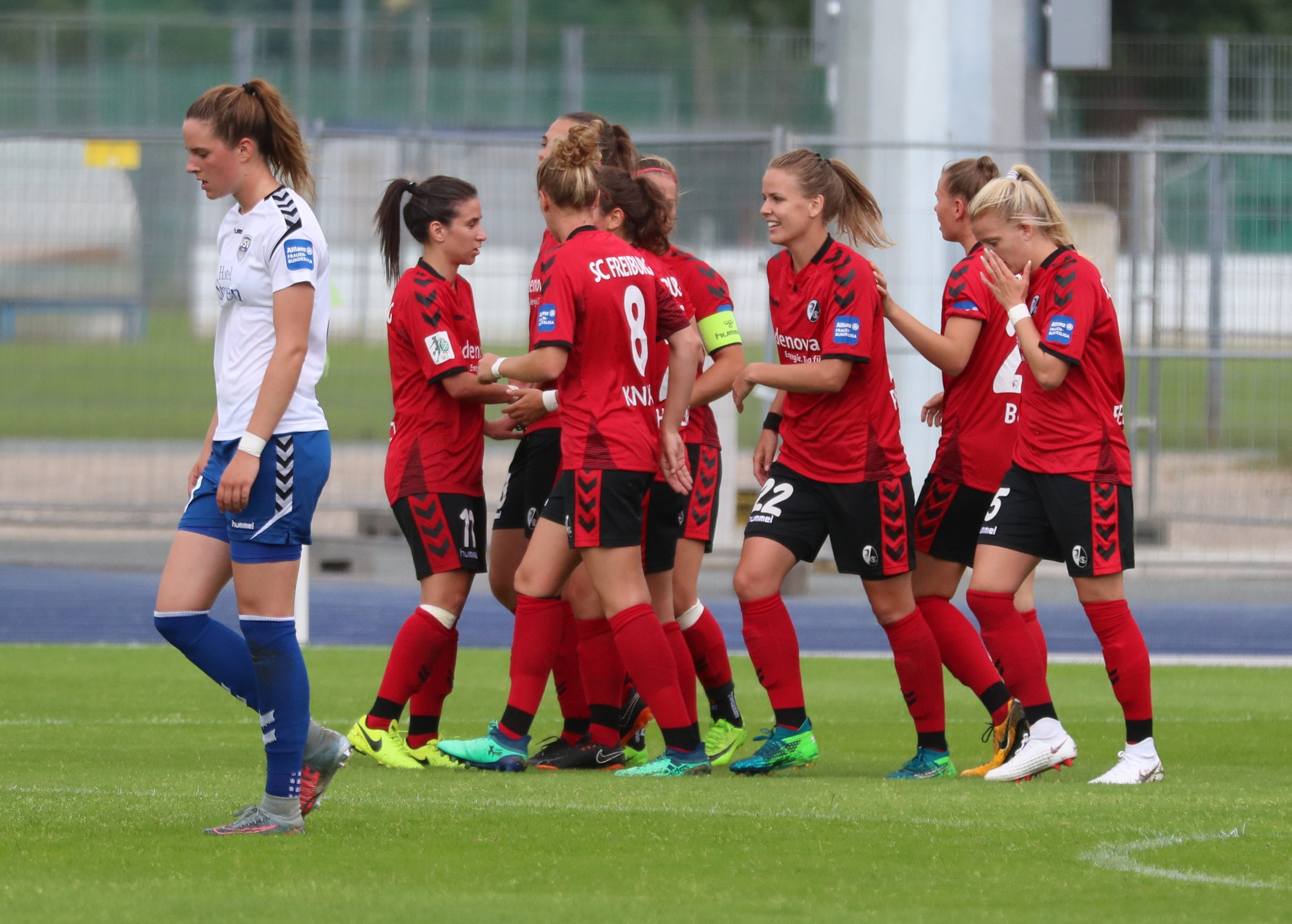
FF USV Jena vs SC Freiburg (Allianz-Frauen-Bundesliga)

The 2018–19 2. Frauen-Bundesliga was the 15th season of Germany's second-tier women's football league, and the first as a single-division league. The season began on 18 August 2018 and concluded on 19 May 2019. The champions and runners-up were promoted to the Frauen-Bundesliga, while the three bottom teams were relegated to the Frauen-Regionalliga.

1. FC Köln and USV Jena gained promotion to the Bundesliga while Hessen Wetzlar, SV Weinberg and SGS Essen II were relegated to the Regionalliga.

== Teams ==
Locations of teams in the 2018–19 2. Frauen-Bundesliga

=== Team changes ===
Entering league		Exiting league	
Promoted from 2017–18 Regionalliga	Relegated from 2017–18 Bundesliga	Promoted to 2018–19 Bundesliga	Relegated to 2018–19 Regionalliga
SGS Essen II; SV Weinberg	USV Jena; 1. FC Köln	Bayer Leverkusen; Borussia Mönchengladbach	SG Andernach; Arminia Bielefeld; Jahn Delmenhorst; SC Freiburg II; SV Henstedt-Ulzburg; Herforder SV; Blau-Weiß Hohen Neuendorf; USV Jena II; 1. FC Köln II; Schott Mainz; 1. FFC Niederkirchen; VfL Sindelfingen

=== Stadiums ===
Team	Home city	Home ground	Capacity
BV Cloppenburg	Cloppenburg	PK Sportpark	5,001
SGS Essen II	Essen	Sportpark am Hallo	3,800
1. FFC Frankfurt II	Frankfurt	Stadion am Brentanobad	5,200
FSV Gütersloh	Gütersloh	Tönnies-Arena	4,252
1899 Hoffenheim II	Sinsheim	Ensinger-Stadion	4,000
USV Jena	Jena	Ernst-Abbe-Sportfeld	10,800
1. FC Köln	Cologne	Südstadion	11,748
SV Meppen	Meppen	Hänsch-Arena	16,500
Bayern Munich II	Aschheim	Sportpark Aschheim	3,000
Turbine Potsdam II	Potsdam	Sportforum Waldstadt	5,000
1. FC Saarbrücken	Saarbrücken	Kieselhumes	12,000
SV Weinberg	Aurach	Sportanlage Vehlbergstraße	1,000
Hessen Wetzlar	Wetzlar	Stadion Wetzlar	8,000
VfL Wolfsburg II	Wolfsburg	VfL-Stadion am Elsterweg	17,600

== League table ==
Pos	Team	Pld	W	D	L	GF	GA	GD	Pts	Promotion or relegation
1	Bayern Munich II (Note: Reserve teams cannot compete in the Frauen-Bundesliga and therefore are ineligible for promotion.) (C)	26	16	5	5	67	27	+40	53	
2	VfL Wolfsburg II	26	16	2	8	42	26	+16	50	
3	1. FC Köln (P)	26	14	5	7	51	33	+18	47	Promotion to Bundesliga
4	USV Jena (P)	26	14	4	8	45	34	+11	46	Promotion to Bundesliga
5	SV Meppen	26	13	6	7	63	38	+25	45	
6	1899 Hoffenheim II	26	11	5	10	40	35	+5	38	
7	Turbine Potsdam II	26	11	4	11	56	46	+10	37	
8	1. FC Saarbrücken	26	9	9	8	55	43	+12	36	
9	FSV Gütersloh	26	9	6	11	37	42	−5	33	
10	1. FFC Frankfurt II	26	9	5	12	27	42	−15	32	
11	BV Cloppenburg	26	8	6	12	37	49	−12	30	
12	Hessen Wetzlar (R)	26	9	3	14	29	45	−16	30	Relegation to Regionalliga
13	SV Weinberg (R)	26	8	6	12	34	59	−25	30	Relegation to Regionalliga
14	SGS Essen II (R)	26	2	0	24	16	80	−64	6	Relegation to Regionalliga

Source: DFB
Rules for classification: 1) Points; 2) Goal difference; 3) Goals scored; 4) Head-to-head points; 5) Head-to-head goal difference; 6) Head-to-head goals scored; 7) Head-to-head away goals scored; 8) Away goals scored; 9) Play-off.
(C) Champions; (P) Promoted; (R) Relegated

== Results ==
Home \ Away	CLO	ES2	FR2	GÜT	HO2	JEN	KÖL	MEP	MU2	PO2	SAA	WEI	WET	WO2
BV Cloppenburg	—	3–0	3–0	3–0	2–1	0–1	1–4	1–1	1–4	2–4	3–2	2–2	1–1	1–0
SGS Essen II	2–1	—	0–2	2–1	2–3	0–3	0–3	0–3	0–6	0–3	1–4	2–4	1–4	0–2
1. FFC Frankfurt II	2–1	1–1	—	2–1	1–0	1–1	0–2	0–5	1–3	2–1	2–2	1–3	0–1	1–0
FSV Gütersloh	1–1	2–0	1–0	—	3–0	5–0	3–2	2–2	0–4	2–1	3–1	3–0	1–2	1–4
1899 Hoffenheim II	0–3	3–1	3–0	2–2	—	0–2	1–2	3–2	2–3	1–1	0–2	5–0	1–0	0–3
USV Jena	2–1	3–1	2–0	3–1	1–0	—	0–1	0–4	1–1	1–4	3–2	6–0	1–0	0–0
1. FC Köln	6–0	2–0	1–0	1–1	0–1	0–0	—	1–2	3–1	1–2	2–1	1–1	3–1	1–2
SV Meppen	4–0	6–1	2–2	3–0	1–1	3–2	1–2	—	1–1	2–5	1–3	3–1	2–1	1–2
Bayern Munich II	2–2	2–0	0–0	2–1	2–3	2–0	5–0	1–2	—	2–0	5–1	2–0	0–1	2–1
Turbine Potsdam II	1–2	5–1	2–3	4–0	0–1	3–2	5–4	2–1	1–2	—	2–2	1–3	4–1	1–1
1. FC Saarbrücken	3–1	4–0	2–2	1–1	1–1	0–4	1–1	4–1	3–3	1–1	—	7–2	1–1	2–0
SV Weinberg	0–0	4–0	1–2	1–1	0–6	0–3	2–2	2–2	0–6	2–0	2–0	—	2–1	0–1
Hessen Wetzlar	3–1	2–0	3–1	0–1	1–1	1–2	0–2	0–5	0–4	3–2	0–5	1–2	—	1–0
VfL Wolfsburg II	3–1	3–1	1–0	1–0	0–1	4–2	2–4	1–3	3–2	4–1	1–0	1–0	2–0	—

Source: DFB
Legend: Blue = home team win; Yellow = draw; Red = away team win.

== Top scorers ==
Rank	Player	Club	Goals
1	(Germany) Julia Matuschewski	1. FC Saarbrücken	20
2	(Germany) Vanessa Fudalla	Bayern Munich II	17
3	(Syria) Jalila Dalaf	SV Meppen	14
4	(Germany) Carolin Schraa	1. FC Köln	12
4	(Germany) Elisa Senß	SV Meppen	12
4	(Germany) Sophie Weidauer	Turbine Potsdam II	12
7	(Germany) Jacqueline de Backer	1. FC Saarbrücken	11
7	(Germany) Chantal Hagel	TSG Hoffenheim II	11
7	(Germany) Karoline Kohr	1. FC Köln	11
7	(Germany) Lisa Seiler	FF USV Jena	11
7	(Japan) Shiho Shimoyamada	SV Meppen	11
7	(Poland) Agnieszka Winczo	BV Cloppenburg	11
