= Oehrli =

Oehrli is a surname. Notable people with the surname include

- Gustav Oehrli (born 1962), Swiss alpine skier
- Jennifer Oehrli (born 1989), Swiss footballer
