= Löwenberg (surname) =

Löwenberg is a surname, meaning "lion mountain" in the German language. Notable people named Löwenberg include:

- Bob Löwenberg, Dutch hematologist
- Daniela Löwenberg (born 1988), German football midfielder
- Mrs. I. Lowenberg (1845–1924), American author, clubwoman
