= 2012–13 2. Frauen-Bundesliga =

2. Bundesliga (women)
- Season: 2012–13
- Champions: BV Cloppenburg (North); TSG 1899 Hoffenheim (South)
- Promoted: BV Cloppenburg; TSG 1899 Hoffenheim
- Relegated: Holstein Kiel; FFC Oldesloe; Bad Neuenahr II; SV RW Bardenbach; 1. FFC Recklinghausen
- Matches: 266
- Goals: 960 (3.61 per match)
- Top goalscorer: Julia Manger (24 goals)

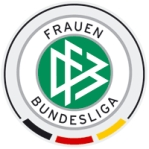

The 2012–13 season of the Women's 2nd Fußball-Bundesliga was the ninth season of Germany's second-tier women's football league.

BV Cloppenburg and 1899 Hoffenheim gained promotion to the 2013–14 Fußball-Bundesliga (women) season, by winning the North and South groups, respectively. 1. FFC Recklinghausen and BW Hohen Neuendorf played each other as they finished in the tenth position from each groups, for the playoff match to determine the fifth team that was relegated.

== Final standings ==
=== North ===
Pos	Team	Pld	W	D	L	GF	GA	GD	Pts	Qualification or relegation
1	BV Cloppenburg (C)	22	17	3	2	54	14	+40	54	Promotion to 2013–14 Fußball-Bundesliga
2	Herforder SV Borussia Friedenstal	22	15	2	5	62	26	+36	47	
3	SV Meppen	22	15	1	6	40	22	+18	46	
4	Turbine Potsdam II	22	14	3	5	60	27	+33	45	
5	Werder Bremen	22	13	3	6	54	32	+22	42	
6	1. FC Lok Leipzig	22	9	6	7	41	37	+4	33	
7	1. FC Lübars	22	9	2	11	31	28	+3	29	
8	Magdeburger FFC	22	6	6	10	28	36	−8	24	
9	FF USV Jena II	22	4	4	14	23	49	−26	16	
10	Blau-Weiß Hohen Neuendorf	22	3	5	14	18	56	−38	14	Qualification for the relegation play-off
11	Holstein Kiel (R)	22	3	4	15	20	54	−34	13	Relegation to 2013–14 Regionalliga
12	FFC Oldesloe (R)	22	4	1	17	16	66	−50	13	Relegation to 2013–14 Regionalliga

Updated to match(es) played on 30 May 2013. Source: kicker.de (in German)
Rules for classification: 1) points; 2) goal difference; 3) number of goals scored.
(C) Champions; (R) Relegated

=== South ===
Pos	Team	Pld	W	D	L	GF	GA	GD	Pts	Qualification or relegation
1	TSG 1899 Hoffenheim (C)	22	18	2	2	73	23	+50	56	Promotion to 2013–14 Fußball-Bundesliga
2	1. FC Köln	22	17	4	1	66	14	+52	55	
3	SC Sand	22	17	3	2	65	22	+43	54	
4	TSV Crailsheim	22	9	5	8	39	31	+8	32	
5	ETSV Würzburg	22	10	2	10	44	53	−9	32	
6	1. FC Saarbrücken	22	9	3	10	40	36	+4	30	
7	Bayern Munich II	22	8	5	9	42	32	+10	29	
8	FFC Frankfurt II	22	8	2	12	27	40	−13	26	
9	1. FFC 08 Niederkirchen	22	6	4	12	37	40	−3	22	
10	1. FFC Recklinghausen (R)	22	5	2	15	31	79	−48	17	Qualification for the relegation play-off
11	Bad Neuenahr II (R)	22	3	5	14	17	48	−31	14	Relegation to 2013–14 Regionalliga
12	SV RW Bardenbach (R)	22	2	3	17	23	86	−63	9	Relegation to 2013–14 Regionalliga

Updated to match(es) played on 30 May 2013. Source: kicker.de (in German)
Rules for classification: 1) points; 2) goal difference; 3) number of goals scored.
(C) Champions; (R) Relegated

== Relegation play-off ==
Blau-Weiß Hohen Neuendorf won the play-off 6–3 on aggregate and remained in the second division.

2 June 2013
14:00

Blau-Weiß Hohen Neuendorf	5 – 1	1. FFC Recklinghausen
Gabriel 40', 76'; Pantelmann 78'; Sommer 80'; Rogg 90+2'	Report	Rogalla 65'

Referee: Daniela Illing
9 June 2013
13:00

1. FFC Recklinghausen	2 – 1	Blau-Weiß Hohen Neuendorf
Rogalla 41'; Pointke 70'	Report	Rogg 83'

Referee: Ines Appelmann
