= Löwenberg =

Löwenberg may refer to:

- Duchy of Löwenberg
- Lwówek Śląski
- Löwenberg Castle
- Löwenberg (surname)
