= Shiho Shimoyamada =

Japanese association football player

Personal information
- Date of birth: 25 December 1994 (age 31)
- Place of birth: Ibaraki Prefecture, Japan
- Position: Forward

Senior career*
Years	Team	Apps	(Gls)
2018–19	SV Meppen		
- * Club domestic league appearances and goals

Shiho Shimoyamada (下山田志帆) is a retired Japanese professional footballer who played as a forward for Bundesliga club SV Meppen. Shimoyamada publicly came out as a lesbian in 2019.
