= Rebecca Gabriel =

American contemporary realist painter and figurative artist

Rebecca Gabriel (born May 7, 1948) is an American contemporary realist painter and figurative artist, specialising in the Renaissance tradition.

== Early life and education ==
She pursued a Bachelor of Arts degree from the University of California and earned a Master of Science in Art Education from Massachusetts College of Art. Gabriel also attained a Master of Fine Arts degree in Painting from the University of Massachusetts. She studied old master painting techniques in Austria with Michael and Ernst Fuchs at the Naropa Institute in Boulder, Colorado.

Gabriel is the recipient of Massachusetts University Fellowship in Painting and Haines Foundation Grant.

== Career ==
Gabriel served as a painting and drawing instructor at Rogue Community College, Southern Oregon University, and Brentwood Art Center. She was an art history instructor at the Passaic County Community College in Patterson, and an Artist-In-Residence in Studio In A School, New York, NY.

Her work has been featured in Calyx, Studio Visit, World of Art MOMA edition, Art Market International, Ashland Daily Tidings (1992-2016), Medford Mail Tribune (2007-2016), Ashland Magazine Fall 2006, Florence Biennale Art XII edition, American Artwork issues (2018-2019), Reality of Illusion, Donald Brewer, USC, 1981, Studio Visit Magazine, and Open Studio Press.

Gabriel's art is a permanent acquisition in multiple venues, such as Roots at Havurah Shir Hadash Sanctuary, Sarah giclee edition print at Temple Emek Shalom, and Nancy Peterson memorial portrait at Southern Oregon University, Taylor Hall.

Gabriel was a contributing artist for the Mirrors Portrait Project at the Firehouse Gallery in Grants Pass, sponsored by RCC. Her future exhibitions include Art Expo New York in 2022.

== Personal life ==
Gabriel is married to a poet, Jonah Bornstein (1977-present),

== Exhibitions ==
- Dreams, 2020, Columbia Arts Center
- Chasing Ghosts, 2019
- Rogue Valley Biennale, Rogue Gallery, Medford, OR, 2013 and 2015
- Multiples, Ashland Art Center, OR, 2015
- Subject Is War, Wiseman Gallery, Rogue Community College, Grants Pass, 2014
- Woman's Journey - A Life in Painting, Rogue Gallery and Art Center, Medford, Oregon, 2008
- Human Form, Newport Visual Arts Center, Newport, OR, 2003
- Sacred and the Sensual, Newport Visual Arts Center, Newport, OR, 2003
- Davis & Cline, Ashland, OR
- Gallerie Karon, Ashland, OR
- Illahe Art Gallery, Ashland, OR
- XII Florence Biennale, Florence, Italy
- Reality of Illusion, USC, traveling exhibition including Oakland Museum, Herbert F. Johnson Museum, Cornell University, Toledo Art Museum, and Ohio, among others
- Flesh and Inside Outside
- Grant Pass Museum of Art
- Schneider Museum of Art, Ashland, OR
- Denver Art Museum, CO
- De Cordova Museum, MA
- Oakland Museum, CA
- Verum Ultimum Art Gallery, Portland, OR
- Israeli Art Market Online Gallery, 2021

== Publication ==
- Woman's Journey - A Life in Painting, Wellstone Press, 2008

== Awards and recognition ==
- All California Art Exhibition, First Award, Henry Hopkins
- Best of Show in the Human Form exhibition, Newport Visual Arts Center, Newport, Oregon
- Finalist in Artists Magazine Annual Competition 2007 under Still-Life painting Little Woman
- Jurors Choice award in the Human Form exhibit, Newport Visual Art Center, OR, 2003
- National Endowment for the Arts display in Executive Chairperson's Office, (2005-2007)
- Art Students' League scholarship in New York City
- Certificate of Achievement in Art from the Office of the Mayor of NYC
- Gold List: Top Contemporary Artists of Today - 6th Edition, Int. Art Market Magazine, Tel Aviv, 2021
