= Jennifer Oehrli =

Swiss footballer (born 1989)

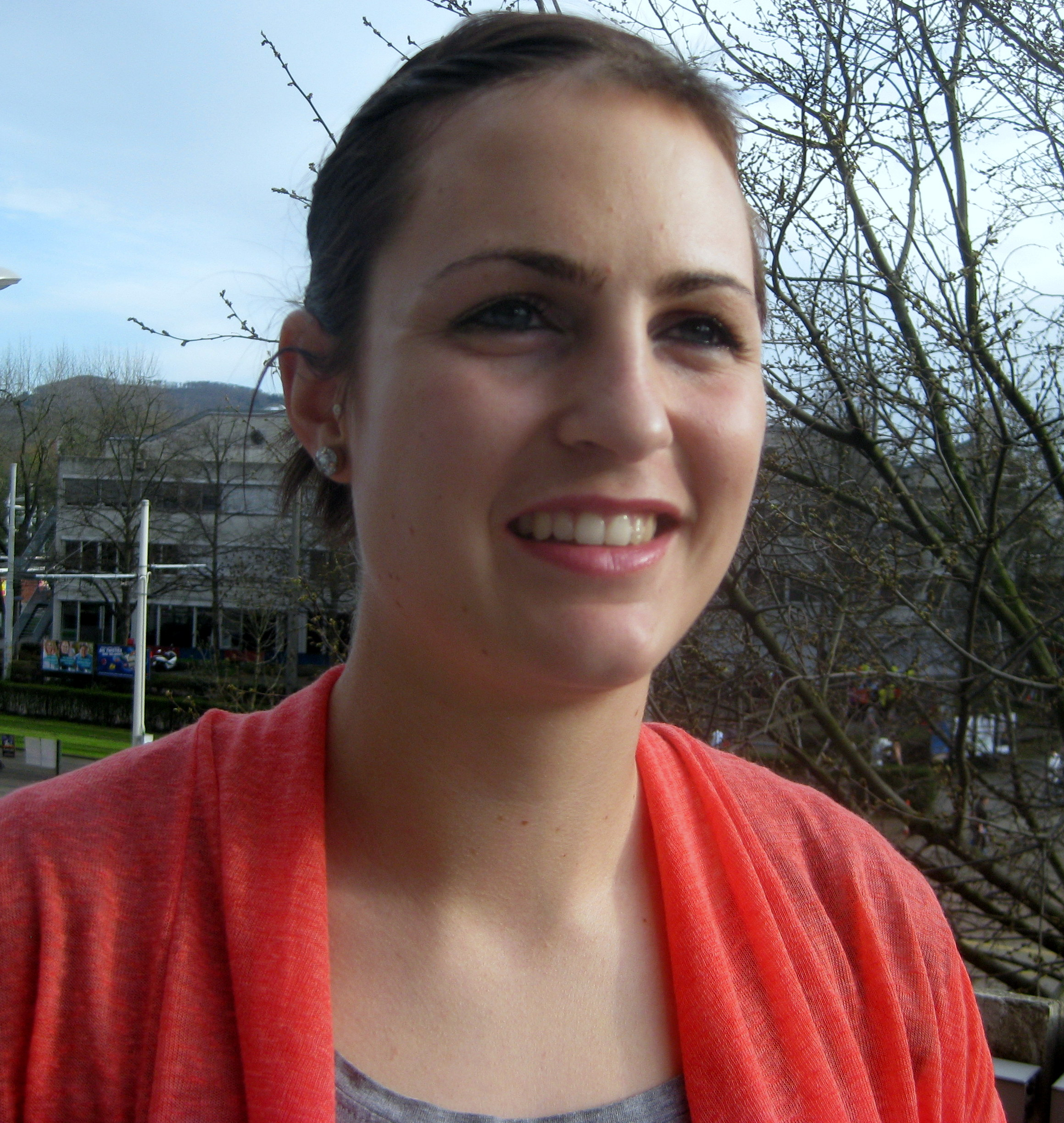
- Jennifer Oehrli in Basel April 2013

Personal information
- Full name: Jennifer Ruth Greti Oehrli
- Date of birth: 13 January 1989 (age 37)
- Place of birth: Bern, Switzerland
- Height: 1.80 m (5 ft 11 in)
- Position: Goalkeeper

Youth career
- 1996–2003: FC Zollbrück
- 2003–2006: Femina Kickers Worb

Senior career*
Years	Team	Apps	(Gls)
2006–2009	FFC Zuchwil 05		
2009–2010	Thun	24	(0)
2010–2013	Basel	48	(0)
2013–2014	BV Cloppenburg	0	(0)
2014–2015	Basel		
2015–2018	BSC YB Frauen	47	(0)
2018–2019	Atlético Madrid	0	(0)

International career^{‡}
2004–2006	Switzerland U17	7	(0)
2010–	Switzerland	15	(0)
- * Club domestic league appearances and goals as of 11 August 2019 ‡ National team caps and goals as of 20:54, 23 June 2015 (UTC)

Jennifer Ruth Greti Oehrli (born 13 January 1989) is a retired Swiss footballer who played as a goalkeeper and previously played in the Nationalliga A. She is a member of the Switzerland national team. She is equally skilled with both feet.

== Personal life ==
Daughter of Rolf and Ruth, Jennifer grew up with her younger sister Svenja in Zollbrück/Rüderswil in the canton of Bern in Switzerland. Her Godparents are from Cyprus, so she often spends her holidays there. She visited the Graduate School of Business in Neuveville and successfully concluded her Professional Maturity of Commerce. In Basel she played football semi-professionally and worked as receptionist in the FC Basel administrative offices. Her intention for the future is to study either sport psychology or food science.

== Club career ==
Oehrli started her children's football as seven-year-old, playing in the same boys team as her cousin. She played as striker in the youth teams of FC Zollbrück and was soon called up to play for the U-14 regional selection team Bern/Jura. Because there were not enough goalkeepers in the selection team she played in goal and at the club she played as striker. Even at this early age she was equally skilled with both feet. After seven years playing in Zollbrück she received an offer from the women's football club SC Worb to play as goalkeeper in their U-18 youth team. Just one year later, as Worb's first team achieved promotion to the Swiss National League B (NLB), she was asked to join the Ladies team. At just sixteen years of age she played the entire season in the NLB.

A year later Oehrli signed for FFC Zuchwil 05 in the Nationalliga A. While at Zuchwil, she obtained international experience, playing in the Women's Champions League 2006–07 and 2007–08. In the 2006-2007 season Oehrli won the Swiss Championship and the Liga-Cup with her new club and they were Championship runners-up the following year.

After three years playing for Zuchwil she moved to FC Thun Frauen and one year later to FC Basel. She scored her first goal in the Swiss National League A (NLA) with a Penalty kick in the 10-0 home win against GC Zürich Frauen in the last game of the 2010-2011 season on 22 May 2011. At the end of the 2012-13 season Basel were Championship runners-up and Cup finalists.

In June 2013 it was announced that Oehrli had transferred to BV Cloppenburg women team.

== International career ==
Oehrli played her international debut for the Swiss national team in the 0-4 defeat against the Netherlands in an international Tournament on 3 March 2010. After Marisa Brunner retired from international football, Oehrli was nominated as the new number 1 in the Swiss team. She played her first game as number 1 during the 0-2 defeat against France on 5 May 2010.

During the match in the 2013 Cyprus Cup on 13 March 2013 against New Zealand she suffered a fractured forearm.

== Titles and Honours ==
Zuchwil

- Swiss Super League (1): 2006/07; runner-up: 2007/08
- Swiss Cup; runner-up: 2006/07

Basel

- Swiss Super League; runner-up: 2012/13
- Swiss Cup (1): 2013/14; runner-up: 2012/13
