= 2013–14 Frauen-Bundesliga =

Frauen-Bundesliga
- Season: 2013–14
- Champions: VfL Wolfsburg
- Relegated: BV Cloppenburg; VfL Sindelfingen
- Champions League: VfL Wolfsburg; 1. FFC Frankfurt
- Matches: 132
- Goals: 521 (3.95 per match)
- Top goalscorer: Célia Šašić (20 goals)

The 2013–14 season of the Frauen-Bundesliga was the 24th season of Germany's premier women's football league. The season began on 7 September 2013 and concluded on 8 June 2014. VfL Wolfsburg defended their title.

On the last matchday 12,464 spectators watched the title-deciding match of Wolfsburg against Frankfurt, setting a new Bundesliga record. Frankfurt, undefeated this season so far, only needed a draw to capture the title. They lost 1–2 and thus Wolfsburg won the championship, despite never being top of the table before the last matchday.

== Teams ==
The teams promoted from the previous 2. Bundesliga season were TSG Hoffenheim as winners of the Southern division and BV Cloppenburg as winners of the Northern division. VfL Sindelfingen held their place in the league following the bankruptcy of SC 07 Bad Neuenahr, who were instead relegated last season. On 1 January 2014, FCR 2001 Duisburg became the women's section of MSV Duisburg and play under that name.

Locations of teams in the 2013–14 Bundesliga

Team	Home city	Home ground
Bayer 04 Leverkusen	Leverkusen	Ulrich-Haberland-Stadion (Amateur)
BV Cloppenburg	Cloppenburg	TimePartner Arena
FC Bayern Munich	Munich	Sportpark Aschheim
MSV Duisburg	Duisburg	PCC-Stadion
SGS Essen	Essen	Stadion für Essen
1. FFC Frankfurt	Frankfurt	Stadion am Brentanobad
SC Freiburg	Freiburg	Möslestadion
TSG 1899 Hoffenheim	Hoffenheim	Rhein-Neckar-Arena
FF USV Jena	Jena	Sportzentrum Oberaue
VfL Sindelfingen	Sindelfingen	Floschenstadion
1. FFC Turbine Potsdam	Potsdam	Karl-Liebknecht-Stadion
VfL Wolfsburg	Wolfsburg	VfL-Stadium

== Broadcast ==
Starting this season Eurosport bought the rights to televise one match every matchday. The first match was Wolfsburg against Bayern on 7 September 2013. It was the first time the Bundesliga played an opening match. The same match is also streamed per DFB-TV over the internet, a long established service.

== League table ==
Pos	Team	Pld	W	D	L	GF	GA	GD	Pts	Qualification or relegation
1	VfL Wolfsburg (C)	22	17	4	1	68	16	+52	55	2014–15 UEFA Champions League Round of 32
2	1. FFC Frankfurt	22	16	5	1	80	15	+65	53	2014–15 UEFA Champions League Round of 32
3	1. FFC Turbine Potsdam	22	15	4	3	64	20	+44	49	
4	FC Bayern Munich	22	11	6	5	49	27	+22	39	
5	FF USV Jena	22	8	7	7	36	32	+4	31	
6	SGS Essen	22	8	3	11	37	42	−5	27	
7	Bayer 04 Leverkusen	22	7	5	10	44	38	+6	26	
8	SC Freiburg	22	7	4	11	39	42	−3	25	
9	TSG 1899 Hoffenheim	22	6	5	11	39	61	−22	23	
10	MSV Duisburg	22	6	4	12	27	45	−18	22	
11	BV Cloppenburg (R)	22	4	5	13	34	60	−26	17	Relegation to 2014–15 2. Bundesliga
12	VfL Sindelfingen (R)	22	0	2	20	4	123	−119	2	Relegation to 2014–15 2. Bundesliga

Updated to match(es) played on 8 June 2014. Source: kicker.de
Rules for classification: 1) points; 2) goal difference; 3) number of goals scored.
(C) Champions; (R) Relegated

== Results ==
Home \ Away	LEV	BVC	BAY	DUI	JEN	FRE	ESS	HOF	SIN	WOL	FRA	POT
Bayer Leverkusen		4–1	3–2	3–0	0–1	5–1	0–1	2–2	8–0	0–4	0–0	1–5
BV Cloppenburg	0–0		1–2	2–2	0–3	1–2	1–3	1–1	7–1	0–2	0–4	1–3
Bayern Munich	2–0	5–2		0–1	5–0	2–1	3–0	2–3	8–0	3–1	1–1	1–2
MSV Duisburg	2–1	1–3	0–1		3–0	1–1	0–3	4–1	7–0	0–4	0–5	0–4
Jena	2–0	2–0	2–2	1–1		2–2	2–0	4–1	2–0	1–1	2–3	0–2
Freiburg	2–2	7–2	0–2	1–0	2–0		1–1	4–1	3–0	2–3	0–2	1–2
SGS Essen	1–4	3–3	1–2	2–0	1–6	2–1		5–1	8–0	0–2	1–2	1–3
1899 Hoffenheim	5–3	2–4	2–2	1–1	1–1	3–2	2–1		1–0	1–2	1–5	2–3
VfL Sindelfingen	0–6	0–2	1–1	0–3	1–1	0–5	0–2	0–5		0–7	0–8	0–7
Wolfsburg	3–0	4–1	1–1	6–0	3–2	4–1	4–0	4–1	8–1		2–1	2–0
FFC Frankfurt	2–2	7–0	4–1	4–0	3–1	3–0	1–1	8–2	12–0	0–0		2–1
Turbine Potsdam	2–0	2–2	1–1	2–1	1–1	4–0	4–0	3–0	12–0	1–1	0–3	

Updated to match(es) played on 8 June 2014. Source: kicker.de
Legend: Blue = home team win; Yellow = draw; Red = away team win.

== Top scorers ==
Updated 8 June 2014

Rank	Scorer	Club	Goals
1	(Germany) Célia Šašić	1. FFC Frankfurt	20
2	(Germany) Kerstin Garefrekes	1. FFC Frankfurt	18
3	(Equatorial Guinea) Genoveva Añonma	1. FFC Turbine Potsdam	16
3	(Germany) Martina Müller	VfL Wolfsburg	16
5	(Germany) Charline Hartmann	SGS Essen	13
6	(United States) Sarah Hagen	Bayern Munich	12
6	(Germany) Mandy Islacker	BV Cloppenburg	12
8	(Germany) Nadine Keßler	VfL Wolfsburg	11
8	(Germany) Sofia Nati	MSV Duisburg	11
10	(New Zealand) Amber Hearn	FF USV Jena	10
10	(Germany) Alexandra Popp	VfL Wolfsburg	10
