= BV Cloppenburg (women) =

Cloppenburg
- Full name: Ballspielverein Cloppenburg e.V. von 1919
- Founded: 2008; 18 years ago
- Ground: Stadion an der Friesoyther Strasse, Cloppenburg
- Capacity: 5,000
- Chairman: Jörg-Uwe Klütz
- Manager: Tanja Schulte
- League: 2. Bundesliga
- 2020–21: 10th (relegated)
- Website: http://www.bvc-kicker.de/
Home colours	Away colours

BV Cloppenburg Frauen is a German women's football team. It represents BV Cloppenburg.

The team has its origins in Regionalliga side SV Höltinghausen, which was absorbed by Cloppenburg in 2008. Cloppenburg earned promotion to the Second Bundesliga in its second try. In its debut it was second to last in the North group and was scheduled to play the relegation play-off against SV Löchgau, but the tie was cancelled due to the withdrawal of Hamburger SV's farm team and both teams avoided relegation. After playing in the 2. Frauen-Bundesliga for the majority of the 2010s decade, they withdrew their team before the start of the 2020–21 season.

== Players ==
=== First Team Squad ===
As of 28 August 2020.

Note: Flags indicate national team as defined under FIFA eligibility rules; some limited exceptions apply. Players may hold more than one non-FIFA nationality.

No.	Pos.	Nation	Player
—	DF	GER	Eileen Reens
—	MF	GER	Daniela Löwenberg
—	MF	GER	Michelle Meyer
—	MF	GER	Lisa Josten
—	FW	GER	Maria-Jolina Prica

=== Former players ===
- (Sweden) Sofia Jakobsson
- (Puerto Rico) Gloria Douglas
- (United States) Madeline McCracken
- (United States) Rashida Beal
- (Netherlands) Dorien Landman
- (Canada) Bryanna McCarthy
- (Brazil) Barbara
- (Switzerland) Jennifer Oehrli
- (United States) Chelsea White
- (Austria) Jasmin Eder
- (Syria) Jalila Dalaf
- (Brazil) Ester
