= 2025–26 FC Bayern Munich (women) season =

German women's football club season

Bayern Munich (women)
2025–26 season
- President: Herbert Hainer
- Head coach: José Barcala
- Stadium: FC Bayern Campus; Allianz Arena (select games)
- Bundesliga: 1st
- DFB-Pokal: Winners
- DFB-Supercup: Winners
- UEFA Champions League: Semi-finals
- Top goalscorer: League: Pernille Harder (16); All: Pernille Harder (28)
- Highest home attendance: 57,762 (vs Bayer Leverkusen, Bundesliga, 6 September 2025) at Allianz Arena
Home colours	Away colours	Third colours

The 2025–26 FC Bayern Munich Frauen season was the club's 26th consecutive season in the Bundesliga.

== Season events ==
On 15 May 2025, José Barcala was appointed manager of FC Bayern Munich Frauen, signing a two-year contract with the club.

Bayern started pre-season preparations on 7 July 2025, and took part in a training camp in Tyrol, Austria between 17 - 21 August 2025.

Bayern started the season by winning the 2025 DFB-Supercup Frauen against VfL Wolfsburg on 30 August 2025.

On 6 September 2025, Bayern set a new attendance record of 57,762 spectators against Bayer Leverkusen.

On 10 January 2026, it was announced that Georgia Stanway will be leaving the club at the end of the 2025/26 season after not renewing her contract.

On 10 January 2026, Bayern travelled to Seville for their winter training camp.

In April 2026, after a win over Union Berlin, Bayern were crowned Champions of the Frauen-Bundesliga, their eighth title.

== Players ==
=== First-team squad ===
As of 29 January 2026

Note: Flags indicate national team as defined under FIFA eligibility rules; some limited exceptions apply. Players may hold more than one non-FIFA nationality.

No.	Pos.	Nation	Player
1	GK	GER	Maria Luisa Grohs
2	DF	CAN	Vanessa Gilles
3	DF	DEN	Stine Ballisager
4	DF	ISL	Glódís Perla Viggósdóttir (captain)
5	DF	SWE	Magdalena Eriksson
7	DF	GER	Giulia Gwinn
8	MF	GER	Lena Oberdorf
9	FW	SRB	Jovana Damnjanović
10	MF	GER	Linda Dallmann
14	MF	GER	Alara Şehitler
15	MF	CIV	Bernadette Amani
17	FW	GER	Klara Bühl
18	MF	JPN	Momoko Tanikawa

No.	Pos.	Nation	Player
19	DF	AUT	Katharina Naschenweng
20	FW	GER	Franziska Kett
21	FW	DEN	Pernille Harder
23	FW	POL	Natalia Padilla
25	MF	AUT	Sarah Zadrazil (vice-captain)
27	MF	ITA	Arianna Caruso
28	MF	AUT	Barbara Dunst
29	FW	ESP	Edna Imade
30	DF	GER	Carolin Simon
31	MF	ENG	Georgia Stanway (vice-captain)
32	GK	GER	Ena Mahmutovic
38	GK	GER	Anna Klink

==== Out on loan ====
Note: Flags indicate national team as defined under FIFA eligibility rules; some limited exceptions apply. Players may hold more than one non-FIFA nationality.

No.	Pos.	Nation	Player
—	DF	COL	Ana María Guzmán (on loan at Palmeiras until 30 June 2026)
29	FW	ESP	Edna Imade (on loan at Real Sociedad until 11 January 2026)

=== Contract renewals ===
No.	Pos.	Nat.	Name	Date	Until	Ref.
18	MF	(Japan)	Momoko Tanikawa	25 November 2025	30 June 2029	
25	MF	(Austria)	Sarah Zadrazil	16 December 2025	30 June 2027	
5	DF	(Sweden)	Magdalena Eriksson	19 December 2025	30 June 2028	
21	FW	(Denmark)	Pernille Harder	19 December 2025	30 June 2028	
4	DF	(Iceland)	Glódís Perla Viggósdóttir	23 December 2025	30 June 2028	
19	DF	(Austria)	Katharina Naschenweng	26 January 2026	30 June 2028	
3	DF	(Denmark)	Stine Ballisager	8 April 2026	30 June 2028	
33	DF	(Germany)	Luzie Zähringer	26 May 2026	30 June 2029	
37	MF	(Germany)	Marie Gmeineder	19 June 2026	30 June 2028	

== Transfers ==
=== Transfers in ===
No.	Pos.	Nat.	Player	Moving from	Type	Fee	Source
Summer
28	MF	(Austria)	Barbara Dunst	(Germany) Eintracht Frankfurt	Transfer	undisclosed	
23	FW	(Poland)	Natalia Padilla	(Spain) Sevilla	Loan return		
3	DF	(Denmark)	Stine Ballisager	(Italy) Fiorentina	Transfer	undisclosed	
2	MF	(Canada)	Vanessa Gilles	(United States) Angel City FC	Transfer	undisclosed	
38	GK	(Germany)	Anna Klink	(Switzerland) FC Basel Frauen	Transfer	undisclosed	
27	MF	(Italy)	Arianna Caruso	(Italy) Juventus	Transfer	undisclosed	
29	FW	(Spain)	Edna Imade	(Spain) Granada	Transfer	undisclosed	
Winter
15	MF	(Ivory Coast)	Bernadette Amani	(Spain) UD Tenerife	Transfer	undisclosed	

=== Transfers out ===
No.	Pos.	Nat.	Player	Moving to	Type	Fee	Source
Summer
22	DF	(France)	Magou Doucouré	(Italy) Napoli	Contract ending		
13	DF	(Brazil)	Tainara		Contract ending		
28	DF	(Germany)	Michelle Ulbrich	(Germany) Werder Bremen	Loan return		
24	FW	(Poland)	Weronika Zawistowska	(Germany) 1. FC Köln	Contract ending		
2	DF	(Sweden)	Linda Sembrant	(Sweden) AIK Fotboll	Contract ending		
41	GK	(Germany)	Anna Wellmann	(Portugal) Sporting CP	Contract ending		
44	GK	(Iceland)	Cecilía Rán Rúnarsdóttir	(Italy) Inter Milan	Transfer	Undisclosed	
23	MF	(Iceland)	Karólína Lea Vilhjálmsdóttir	(Italy) Inter Milan	Transfer	undisclosed	
12	MF	(Germany)	Sydney Lohmann	(England) Manchester City	Transfer	undisclosed	
18	MF	(Netherlands)	Jill Baijings	(England) Aston Villa	Transfer	undisclosed	
26	MF	(Scotland)	Sam Kerr	(England) Liverpool	Transfer	undisclosed	
15	DF	(Colombia)	Ana María Guzmán	(Brazil) Palmeiras	Loan	undisclosed	
16	MF	(Sweden)	Julia Zigiotti Olme	(England) Manchester United	Transfer	undisclosed	
Winter
11	FW	(Germany)	Lea Schüller	(England) Manchester United	Transfer	undisclosed	
6	DF	(Norway)	Tuva Hansen	(England) West Ham	Transfer	undisclosed	

== Pre-season and friendlies ==
25 July 2025 Friendly	Bayern Munich	1–3	Newcastle United	Munich
	Terakaj 77'	Report	Hayles 44'; Joel 63', 74'	Stadium: FC Bayern Campus; Attendance: 0 (Note: Played behind closed doors.)

15 August 2025 Friendly	Bayern Munich	2–2	FC Zürich Frauen
	Şehitler 78'; Stanway 83'	Report	Schuster 8'; Dubs 90+2'	Attendance: 4,300; Referee: Daniela Kottmann

21 August 2025 Friendly	Bayern Munich	4–1	Real Madrid
	Stanway 7'; Dallmann 8'; Tanikawa 32'; Padilla-Bidas 67'	Report	Feller 37'	Attendance: 2,500

26 August 2025 Friendly	OL Lyonnes	4–1	Bayern Munich
	Renard 41'; Diani 81'; Joseph 90'; Katoto 90+3'	Report	Oberdorf 59'	Attendance: 0 Referee: Davina Lutz

== Competitions ==
=== Overview ===
Competition	First match	Last match	Starting round	Final position	Record							
Competition	First match	Last match	Starting round	Final position	Pld	W	D	L	GF	GA	GD	Win %
Bundesliga	6 September 2025	17 May 2026	Matchday 1	Winners	26	24	2	0	90	9	+81	92.31
DFB-Pokal	29 September 2025	14 May 2026	First round	Winners	5	5	0	0	16	0	+16	100.00
DFB-Supercup	30 August 2025		Final	Winners	1	1	0	0	4	2	+2	100.00
UEFA Champions League	7 October 2025	3 May 2026	League phase	Semi-finals	10	6	2	2	22	21	+1	60.00
Total					42	36	4	2	132	32	+100	85.71

Source: Competitions

=== DFB-Supercup ===
30 August 2025 Final	Bayern Munich	4–2	VfL Wolfsburg	Wildparkstadion, Karlsruhe
14:00 CEST (UTC+2)	Eriksson 18'; Damnjanović 25'; Schüller 72'; Stanway 78' (pen.)	Report	Endemann 57'; Minge 88' (pen.)	Attendance: 16,933; Referee: Riem Hussein

=== Bundesliga ===
==== Standings ====
Pos	Team	Pld	W	D	L	GF	GA	GD	Pts	Qualification or relegation
1	Bayern Munich (C)	26	24	2	0	90	9	+81	74	Qualification for Champions League league phase
2	VfL Wolfsburg	26	18	4	4	72	38	+34	58	Qualification for Champions League third qualifying round
3	Eintracht Frankfurt	26	16	3	7	65	43	+22	51	Qualification for Champions League second qualifying round
4	TSG Hoffenheim	26	14	4	8	48	30	+18	46	
5	Bayer Leverkusen	26	15	1	10	46	36	+10	46	

Source: DFB
Rules for classification: 1) Points; 2) Goal difference; 3) Goals scored; 4) Head-to-head results; 5) Head-to-head away goals scored; 6) Away goals scored; 7) Play-off.
(C) Champions

==== Result summary ====
Overall								Home						Away					
Pld	W	D	L	GF	GA	GD	Pts	W	D	L	GF	GA	GD	W	D	L	GF	GA	GD
26	24	2	0	90	9	+81	74	11	2	0	41	4	+37	13	0	0	49	5	+44

Source: DFB

==== Matchdays ====
Matchday	1	2	3	4	5	6	7	8	9	10	11	12	13	14	15	17	16^{1}	19	20	21	22	23	18^{2}	24	25	26
Ground	H	A	H	H	H	A	H	H	A	H	A	A	H	A	H	A	A	H	A	A	H	A	A	H	H	A
Result	W	W	D	W	W	W	W	W	W	W	W	W	W	W	W	W	W	W	W	W	W	W	W	D	W	W
Position	3	2	2	1	2	1	1	1	1	1	1	1	1	1	1	1	1	1	1	1	1	1	1	1	1	1
Points	3	6	7	10	13	16	19	22	25	28	31	34	37	40	43	46	49	52	55	58	61	64	67	68	71	74

Source: DFB
A = Away; H = Home; W = Win; D = Draw; L = Loss
Notes:
- ^{1} Matchday 16 (v. Carl Zeiss Jena) was postponed due to weather conditions.
- ^{2} Matchday 18 (v. Werder Bremen) was postponed due to weather conditions.

==== Results ====
6 September 2025 1	Bayern Munich	2–0	Bayer Leverkusen	Munich
17:45 CEST (UTC+2)	Gilles 76'; Bühl 78'	Report		Stadium: Allianz Arena; Attendance: 57,762; Referee: Franziska Wildfeuer

14 September 2025 2	RB Leipzig	0–3	Bayern Munich	Leipzig
14:00 CEST (UTC+2)	Schasching (yellow card) 48'	Report	Oberdorf 10', 57'; Simon (yellow card) 53'; Naschenweng (yellow card) 79'; Gilles 90+1'	Stadium: Red Bull Arena; Attendance: 10,287; Referee: Naemi Breier

20 September 2025 3	Bayern Munich	0–0	Carl Zeiss Jena	Munich
14:00 CEST (UTC+2)	Viggósdóttir (yellow card) 83'	Report	Gora (yellow card) 24'; Jaron (yellow card) 39'; Juckel (yellow card) 56'; Haering (yellow card) 90+5'	Stadium: FC Bayern Campus; Attendance: 2,500; Referee: Angelika Söder

23 September 2025 4	Bayern Munich	4–0	SC Freiburg	Munich
18:00 CEST (UTC+2)	Gilles 16'; Oberdorf 63'; Schüller 80'; Bühl 90'	Report	Egli (yellow card) 23'	Stadium: FC Bayern Campus; Attendance: 2,154; Referee: Davina Lutz

4 October 2025 5	Bayern Munich	4–0	Werder Bremen	Munich
14:00 CEST (UTC+2)	Caruso 31'; Tanikawa 34'; Dallmann 64'; Schüller 78'	Report	El Sherif (yellow card) 64'	Stadium: FC Bayern Campus; Attendance: 2,500; Referee: Selina Menzel

11 October 2025 6	VfL Wolfsburg	1–3	Bayern Munich	Wolfsburg
15:00 CEST (UTC+2)	Minge 48'; Wedemeyer (red card) 90+3'	Report	Bühl 27'; Tanikawa 57'; Eriksson (yellow card) 79'; Şehitler 90+5'	Stadium: Volkswagen Arena; Attendance: 12,495; Referee: Fabienne Michel

19 October 2025 7	Bayern Munich	5–1	1. FC Köln	Munich
16:00 CEST (UTC+2)	Tanikawa 45+7'; Eriksson 53' (yellow card) 79'; Stanway 60'; Ballisager 71'; Harder 84' (pen.)	Report	Jessen 5'; Imping (yellow card) 41'; Achcińska (yellow card) 45+9'; Vogt (yellow card) 77'	Stadium: FC Bayern Campus; Attendance: 2,500; Referee: Miriam Schwermer

1 November 2025 8	Bayern Munich	4–1	SGS Essen	Munich
14:00 CET (UTC+1)	Schüller 16', 45+1'; Harder 20'; Tanikawa (yellow card) 81'; Dallmann 88'	Report	Maier 2'; Potsi (yellow card) 51'	Stadium: FC Bayern Campus; Attendance: 2,500; Referee: Karoline Wacker

4 November 2025 9	1. FC Nürnberg	0–6	Bayern Munich	Nuremberg
18:00 CET (UTC+1)	Senelius (yellow card) 81'	Report	Dallmann 9'; Harder 15', 41'; Bühl 61'; Padilla 70'; Fördős 90+1' (o.g.)	Stadium: Max-Morlock-Stadion; Attendance: 7,301; Referee: Franziska Wildfeuer

7 November 2025 10	Bayern Munich	4–0	Union Berlin	Munich
18:30 CET (UTC+1)	Dallmann 9'; Harder 19'; Gwinn 25'; Schneider 48' (o.g.)	Report	Halverkamps (yellow card) 71'	Stadium: FC Bayern Campus; Attendance: 2,500; Referee: Naemi Breier

23 November 2025 11	TSG Hoffenheim	1–5	Bayern Munich	Sinsheim
15:30 CET (UTC+1)	Ampoorter 10' (pen.); Kaut (yellow card) 21' (yellow-red card) 45'	Report	Stanway 30' (yellow card) 85'; Şehitler 49'; Tanikawa 56', 74'; Viggósdóttir (yellow card) 77'; Caruso 80'	Stadium: Dietmar-Hopp-Stadion; Attendance: 3,440; Referee: Riem Hussein

7 December 2025 12	Eintracht Frankfurt	0–5	Bayern Munich	Frankfurt
17:00 CET (UTC+1)		Report	Bühl 12'; Damnjanović 45', 48'; Harder 45+2'; Şehitler (yellow card) 60' (goal) 67'; Viggósdóttir (yellow card) 61'	Stadium: Stadion am Brentanobad; Attendance: 5,750; Referee: Karoline Wacker

14 December 2025 13	Bayern Munich	6–0	Hamburger SV	Munich
14:00 CET (UTC+1)	Gwinn 16' (yellow card) 61'; Stanway 27' (pen.); Bühl 45+3'; Schulz 47' (o.g.); Harder 63'; Schüller 85'	Report	Böhler (yellow card) 62'	Stadium: FC Bayern Campus; Attendance: 2,500; Referee: Nadine Westerhoff

22 December 2025 14	Bayer Leverkusen	0–3	Bayern Munich	Leverkusen
18:00 CET (UTC+1)	Turányi (yellow card) 25'; Wamser (yellow card) 90+6'	Report	Kett 16'; Simon (yellow card) 29'; Tanikawa 75' (pen.); Stanway 86' (pen.)	Stadium: Ulrich-Haberland-Stadion; Attendance: 3,011; Referee: Miriam Schwermer

25 January 2026 15	Bayern Munich	3–0	RB Leipzig	Munich
18:30 CET (UTC+1)	Tanikawa 6' (pen.); Kett 67'; Damnjanović 69'; Amani (yellow card) 76'	Report	Joly (yellow card) 43'	Stadium: FC Bayern Campus; Attendance: 2,500; Referee: Karoline Wacker

6 February 2026 17	SC Freiburg	1–4	Bayern Munich	Freiburg
18:30 CET (UTC+1)	Kolb 45+1'; Sigurðardóttir (yellow card) 90+4'	Report	Harder 27', 58'; Imade 75'; Dallmann 79'; Eriksson (yellow card) 83'	Stadium: Dreisamstadion; Attendance: 6,712; Referee: Naemi Breier

11 February 2026 16	Carl Zeiss Jena	0–6	Bayern Munich	Jena
18:00 CET (UTC+1)	Reuter (yellow card) 43'; Tietz (yellow card) 90'	Report	Damnjanović 19', 26'; Tanikawa 39'; Stanway 51'; Harder 60'; Imade 88'	Stadium: Ernst-Abbe-Sportfeld; Attendance: 2,038; Referee: Nadine Westerhoff
Note: The match, which was originally scheduled for 30 January, was postponed due to weather conditions.

22 February 2026 19	Bayern Munich	4–1	VfL Wolfsburg	Munich
16:20 CET (UTC+1)	Stanway (yellow card) 17' (goal) 70'; Damnjanović 54', 56'; Bühl 80'; Dunst (yellow card) 88'	Report	Bussy 16' (yellow card) 40'; Küver (yellow card) 25'; Endemann (yellow card) 32'; Zicai (yellow card) 78'	Stadium: FC Bayern Campus; Attendance: 2,500; Referee: Riem Hussein

15 March 2026 20	1. FC Köln	0–3	Bayern Munich	Cologne
17:00 CET (UTC+1)		Report	Harder 21', 29'; Dallmann 38'; Dunst (yellow card) 58'	Stadium: Franz-Kemer-Stadium; Attendance: 4,104; Referee: Angelika Söder

20 March 2026 21	SGS Essen	0–5	Bayern Munich	Essen
18:30 CET (UTC+1)	Meißner (red card) 8'; Flach (yellow card) 50'	Report	Harder 4', 68' (pen.); Dallmann 9'; Padilla 71'; Imade 89'	Stadium: Stadion an der Hafenstraße; Attendance: 4,843; Referee: Franziska Wildfeuer

28 March 2026 22	Bayern Munich	2–0	1. FC Nürnberg	Munich
14:00 CET (UTC+1)	Imade 46'; Padilla 80'	Report		Stadium: FC Bayern Campus; Attendance: 2,500; Referee: Karoline Wacker

22 April 2026 23	Union Berlin	2–3	Bayern Munich	Berlin
18:00 CEST (UTC+2)	Heiseler (yellow card) 7'; Weidauer 11'; Kamber 77'	Report	Imade 8'; Amani (yellow card) 25'; Dunst 50'; Simon (yellow card) 57'; Gwinn 84'	Stadium: Stadion An der Alten Försterei; Attendance: 13,220; Referee: Davina Lutz

29 April 2026 18	Werder Bremen	0–2	Bayern Munich	Bremen
18:00 CEST (UTC+2)	Sternad (yellow card) 68'; Hausicke (yellow card) 75'	Report	Padilla (yellow card) 13' (goal) 60'; Caruso (yellow card) 57'; Harder 66' (pen.)	Stadium: Weserstadion Platz 11; Referee: Lara Wolf
Note: The match, which was originally scheduled for 16 February, was postponed due to weather conditions.

6 May 2026 24	Bayern Munich	1–1	TSG Hoffenheim	Munich
18:00 CEST (UTC+2)	Eriksson 89'	Report	Cerci (yellow card) 26' (goal) 41'; Rankin (yellow card) 56'	Stadium: FC Bayern Campus; Attendance: 2,378; Referee: Sina Diekmann

9 May 2026 25	Bayern Munich	2–0	Eintracht Frankfurt	Munich
15:45 CEST (UTC+2)	Caruso 12'; Harder 47'; Amani (yellow card) 76'; Dunst (yellow card) 88'	Report	Gräwe (yellow card) 31'; Senß (yellow card) 63'	Stadium: FC Bayern Campus; Attendance: 2,500; Referee: Karoline Wacker

17 May 2026 26	Hamburger SV	0–1	Bayern Munich	Hamburg
14:00 CEST (UTC+2)	Machtens (yellow card) 83'; Wucher (yellow card) 87'	Report	Şehitler (yellow card) 56'; Stanway 89' (pen.)	Stadium: Volksparkstadion; Attendance: 17,637; Referee: Riem Hussein

=== DFB-Pokal ===
29 September 2025 First round	Borussia Dortmund	0–2	Bayern Munich	Dortmund
18:30 CEST (UTC+2)		Report	Harder 28', 34'	Stadium: Stadion Rote Erde; Attendance: 15,755; Referee: Anna-Lena Heidenreich

16 November 2025 Round of 16	FC Ingolstadt	0–3	Bayern Munich	Ingolstadt
14:00 CET (UTC+1)		Report	Dunst 48'; Schüller 56'; Padilla 90+7'	Stadium: ESV-Stadion; Attendance: 2,986; Referee: Annika Kost

11 March 2026 Quarter-finals	Hamburger SV	0–3	Bayern Munich	Hamburg
18:30 CET (UTC+1)	Schulz (yellow card) 21'	Report	Imade 6'; Dunst (yellow card) 14'; Kett 66'; Padilla 88' (yellow card) 90+5'; Gilles (yellow card) 90+3'	Stadium: Volksparkstadion; Attendance: 12,638; Referee: Miriam Schwermer

6 April 2026 Semi-finals	Bayern Munich	4–0	SGS Essen	Munich
15:30 CEST (UTC+2)	Tanikawa 29'; Harder 40'; Caruso (yellow card) 45+1'; Imade 45+3', 73'	Report	Flach (yellow card) 79'	Stadium: FC Bayern Campus; Attendance: 2,500; Referee: Fabienne Michel

14 May 2026 Final	VfL Wolfsburg	0–4	Bayern Munich	Cologne
16:00 CEST (UTC+2)		Report	Stanway 45+2' (pen.); Harder 59'; Kett (yellow card) 68'; Tanikawa 77'; Caruso 84'	Stadium: RheinEnergieStadion; Attendance: 46,064; Referee: Franziska Wildfeuer

=== UEFA Champions League ===
As champions of the 2024–25 Frauen-Bundesliga, Bayern Munich entered this season's competition at the league phase.

==== League phase ====
===== League phase table =====
Pos	Team	Pld	W	D	L	GF	GA	GD	Pts	Qualification
2	(French Football Federation) OL Lyonnes	6	5	1	0	18	5	+13	16	Advance to the quarter-finals (seeded)
3	(The Football Association) Chelsea	6	4	2	0	20	3	+17	14	Advance to the quarter-finals (seeded)
4	(German Football Association) Bayern Munich	6	4	1	1	14	13	+1	13	Advance to the quarter-finals (seeded)
5	(The Football Association) Arsenal	6	4	0	2	11	6	+5	12	Advance to the knockout phase play-offs (seeded)
6	(The Football Association) Manchester United	6	4	0	2	7	9	−2	12	Advance to the knockout phase play-offs (seeded)

Source: UEFA
Rules for classification: League phase tiebreakers

===== Matches =====
7 October 2025 1	Barcelona (Spain)	7–1	(Germany) Bayern Munich	Sant Joan Despí, Spain
21:00 CEST (UTC+2)	Putellas 4'; Pajor 12', 56'; Brugts 27'; Paralluelo 45+1'; Pina 88', 90+2'	Report	Stanway (yellow card) 29'; Bühl 32'	Stadium: Johan Cruyff Stadium; Attendance: 4,409; Referee: Silvia Gasperotti (Italy)

16 October 2025 2	Bayern Munich (Germany)	2–1	(Italy) Juventus	Munich, Germany
21:00 CEST (UTC+2)	Harder 11'; Stanway (yellow card) 80'; Oberdorf (yellow card) 89'; Schüller 90+4'	Report	Schatzer 17'	Stadium: FC Bayern Campus; Attendance: 2,367; Referee: Stéphanie Frappart (France)

12 November 2025 3	Bayern Munich (Germany)	3–2	(England) Arsenal	Munich, Germany
18:45 CET (UTC+1)	Şehitler 67'; Harder 80'; Viggósdóttir 86'	Report	Fox 5'; Caldentey 23'	Stadium: Allianz Arena; Attendance: 15,407; Referee: Marta Huerta de Aza (Spain)

20 November 2025 4	Paris Saint-Germain (France)	1–3	(Germany) Bayern Munich	Paris, France
21:00 CET (UTC+1)	Karchaoui 16'; Yaya (yellow card) 68'	Report	Dallmann 17'; Tanikawa 34'; Damnjanović 89'	Stadium: Parc des Princes; Attendance: 13,798; Referee: Alina Peşu (Romania)

10 December 2025 5	Atlético Madrid (Spain)	2–2	(Germany) Bayern Munich	Alcalá de Henares, Spain
21:00 CET (UTC+1)	Bøe Risa 13' (pen.); García (yellow card) 66'; Fiamma 88'	Report	Harder 63', 78'; Tanikawa (yellow card) 75'	Stadium: Centro Deportivo Wanda; Attendance: 600; Referee: Maria Sole Ferrieri Caputi (Italy)

17 December 2025 6	Bayern Munich (Germany)	3–0	(Norway) Vålerenga	Munich, Germany
21:00 CET (UTC+1)	Tanikawa 2'; Ballisager 11'; Harder 58'	Report		Stadium: FC Bayern Campus; Attendance: 2,120; Referee: Désirée Grundbacher (Switzerland)

==== Knockout phase ====
===== Quarter-finals =====
25 March 2026 1st leg	Manchester United (England)	2–3	(Germany) Bayern Munich	Manchester, England
21:00 CET (UTC+1)	Le Tissier 24' (pen.); Lundkvist 76'	Report	Harder 2', 71'; Simon (yellow card) 28'; Tanikawa 84'	Stadium: Old Trafford; Attendance: 7,513; Referee: Olatz Rivera Olmedo (Spain)

1 April 2026 2nd leg	Bayern Munich (Germany)	2–1 (5–3 agg.)	(England) Manchester United	Munich, Germany
18:45 CEST (UTC+2)	Viggósdóttir 81'; Dallmann 84'	Report	Malard 11'; Le Tissier (yellow card) 90+3'	Stadium: Allianz Arena; Attendance: 25,000; Referee: Tess Olofsson (Sweden)

===== Semi-finals =====
25 April 2026 1st leg	Bayern Munich (Germany)	1–1	(Spain) Barcelona	Allianz Arena, Munich
18:15	Kett 69'	Report	Pajor 8'	Attendance: 31,000; Referee: Ivana Martinčić (Croatia)

3 May 2026 2nd leg	Barcelona (Spain)	4–2	(Germany) Bayern Munich	Camp Nou, Barcelona
16:30	Paralluelo 13'; Putellas 22', 58'; Pajor 54'	Report	Dallmann 17'; Harder 71'	Attendance: 60,021; Referee: Stéphanie Frappart (France)

== Statistics ==
=== Appearances and goals ===
As of 17 May 2026

Starting appearances are listed first, followed by substitute appearances after the + symbol where applicable.

No.	Pos	Nat	Player	Total		Bundesliga		DFB-Pokal		DFB-Supercup		Champions League	
No.	Pos	Nat	Player	Apps	Goals	Apps	Goals	Apps	Goals	Apps	Goals	Apps	Goals
Goalkeepers
1	GK	(Germany) GER	Maria Luisa Grohs	11	0	9	0	0	0	0	0	2	0
32	GK	(Germany) GER	Ena Mahmutovic	31	0	17	0	5	0	1	0	8	0
38	GK	(Germany) GER	Anna Klink	0	0	0	0	0	0	0	0	0	0
Defenders
2	DF	(Canada) CAN	Vanessa Gilles	27	3	9+5	3	2+3	0	0+1	0	6+1	0
3	DF	(Denmark) DEN	Stine Ballisager	31	2	16+3	1	2	0	1	0	5+4	1
4	DF	(Iceland) ISL	Glódís Perla Viggósdóttir	30	2	13+6	0	2	0	0	0	8+1	2
5	DF	(Sweden) SWE	Magdalena Eriksson	23	3	15+1	2	4	0	1	1	2	0
7	DF	(Germany) GER	Giulia Gwinn	31	3	13+4	3	5	0	0	0	8+1	0
19	DF	(Austria) AUT	Katharina Naschenweng	19	0	7+7	0	1+2	0	0	0	0+2	0
20	DF	(Germany) GER	Franziska Kett	35	4	16+6	2	3	1	1	0	9	1
30	DF	(Germany) GER	Carolin Simon	29	0	15+3	0	1+4	0	1	0	4+1	0
33	DF	(Germany) GER	Luzie Zähringer	4	0	1+3	0	0	0	0	0	0	0
Midfielders
8	MF	(Germany) GER	Lena Oberdorf	8	3	3+2	3	0+1	0	0+1	0	0+1	0
10	MF	(Germany) GER	Linda Dallmann	36	10	17+5	7	3	0	1	0	9+1	3
14	MF	(Germany) GER	Alara Şehitler	25	4	5+11	3	2	0	0+1	0	0+6	1
15	MF	(Ivory Coast) CIV	Bernadette Amani	16	0	4+5	0	1+2	0	0	0	4	0
18	MF	(Japan) JPN	Momoko Tanikawa	37	13	19+4	8	2+1	2	1	0	9+1	3
25	MF	(Austria) AUT	Sarah Zadrazil	5	0	3+1	0	0	0	1	0	0	0
27	MF	(Italy) ITA	Arianna Caruso	35	4	15+5	3	4+1	1	0	0	5+5	0
28	MF	(Austria) AUT	Barbara Dunst	20	2	6+11	1	2+1	1	0	0	0	0
31	MF	(England) ENG	Georgia Stanway	40	9	22+3	7	5	1	1	1	9	0
34	MF	(Austria) AUT	Maria Plattner	1	0	0+1	0	0	0	0	0	0	0
36	MF	(Germany) GER	Laila Portella	3	0	1+1	0	0+1	0	0	0	0	0
37	MF	(Germany) GER	Marie Gmeineder	2	0	0+1	0	0+1	0	0	0	0	0
Forwards
9	FW	(Serbia) SRB	Jovana Damnjanović	22	9	10+5	7	1+1	0	1	1	3+1	1
17	FW	(Germany) GER	Klara Bühl	31	8	16+4	7	2	0	0+1	0	8	1
21	FW	(Denmark) DEN	Pernille Harder	39	28	17+7	16	4	4	0+1	0	9+1	8
23	FW	(Poland) POL	Natalia Padilla	18	6	4+8	4	1+3	2	0	0	0+2	0
29	FW	(Spain) ESP	Edna Imade	17	8	6+5	5	2+1	3	0	0	0+3	0
Players transferred/loaned out during the season
6	DF	(Norway) NOR	Tuva Hansen	7	0	2+4	0	0+1	0	0	0	0	0
11	FW	(Germany) GER	Lea Schüller	17	8	5+5	5	1+1	1	1	1	2+2	1

Source: FBref.com

=== Goalscorers ===
As of match played 17 May 2026

Includes all competitive matches. The list is sorted alphabetically by surname when total goals are equal.

Rank	No.	Pos.	Nat.	Player	Bundesliga	DFB-Pokal	DFB-Supercup	Champions League	Total
1	21	FW	(Denmark)	Pernille Harder	16	4	0	8	28
2	18	MF	(Japan)	Momoko Tanikawa	8	2	0	3	13
3	10	MF	(Germany)	Linda Dallmann	7	0	0	3	10
4	9	FW	(Serbia)	Jovana Damnjanović	7	0	1	1	9
4	31	MF	(England)	Georgia Stanway	7	1	1	0	9
6	17	FW	(Germany)	Klara Bühl	7	0	0	1	8
6	29	FW	(Spain)	Edna Imade	5	3	0	0	8
6	11	FW	(Germany)	Lea Schüller	5	1	1	1	8
9	16	FW	(Poland)	Natalia Padilla	4	2	0	0	6
10	27	MF	(Italy)	Arianna Caruso	3	1	0	0	4
10	20	DF	(Germany)	Franziska Kett	2	1	0	1	4
10	14	MF	(Germany)	Alara Şehitler	3	0	0	1	4
13	5	DF	(Sweden)	Magdalena Eriksson	2	0	1	0	3
13	2	DF	(Canada)	Vanessa Gilles	3	0	0	0	3
13	7	DF	(Germany)	Giulia Gwinn	3	0	0	0	3
13	8	MF	(Germany)	Lena Oberdorf	3	0	0	0	3
17	3	DF	(Denmark)	Stine Ballisager	1	0	0	1	2
17	28	MF	(Austria)	Barbara Dunst	1	1	0	0	2
17	4	DF	(Iceland)	Glódís Perla Viggósdóttir	0	0	0	2	2
Own goals (from the opponents)					3	0	0	0	3
Totals					90	16	4	22	132
