= 2025–26 DFB-Pokal Frauen =

Tournament details
- Country: Germany
- Venue(s): RheinEnergieStadion, Cologne
- Dates: 16 August 2025 – 14 May 2026
- Teams: 48

Final positions
- Champions: Bayern Munich (3rd title)
- Runners-up: VfL Wolfsburg

Tournament statistics
- Matches played: 47
- Goals scored: 198 (4.21 per match)
- Attendance: 124,917 (2,658 per match)
- Top goal scorer(s): Emma Kusch; Nina Penzkofer (5 goals)
- Goals scored in penalty shoot-outs not included.

The 2025–26 DFB-Pokal was the 44th season of the annual German football cup competition. Several teams participated in the competition, including all teams from the previous year's Frauen-Bundesliga and the 2. Frauen-Bundesliga, excluding second teams. The competition began on 16 August 2025 with the first of six rounds and ended on 14 May 2026 with the final at the RheinEnergieStadion in Cologne, a nominally neutral venue, which has hosted the final since 2010.

Bayern Munich defeated VfL Wolfsburg 4–0 in the final to win their third title.

== Participating clubs ==
The following clubs qualified for the competition:

Bundesliga the 12 clubs of the 2024–25 season	2. Bundesliga; 11 of the 14 clubs of the 2024–25 season (Note: Second teams are not eligible.)	Regionalliga; 4 of 5 champions of the 2024–25 season
Werder Bremen; SGS Essen; Eintracht Frankfurt; SC Freiburg; TSG Hoffenheim; Carl Zeiss Jena; 1. FC Köln; Bayer Leverkusen; RB Leipzig; Bayern Munich; Turbine Potsdam; VfL Wolfsburg	SG Andernach; Union Berlin; VfL Bochum; FSV Gütersloh; Hamburger SV; FC Ingolstadt; SV Meppen; Borussia Mönchengladbach; 1. FC Nürnberg; SC Sand; SV 67 Weinberg	Viktoria Berlin; Mainz 05; VfB Stuttgart; VfR Warbeyen
Verbandspokal the 21 winners of the regional association cups
Baden: Karlsruher SC; Bavaria: Greuther Fürth; Berlin: Borussia Pankow; Brandenburg: FSV Babelsberg 74; Bremen: ATS Buntentor; Hamburg: SC Victoria Hamburg; Hesse: Kickers Offenbach	Lower Rhine: TSV Solingen-Aufderhöhe; Lower Saxony: Hannover 96; Mecklenburg-Vorpommern: 1. FC Neubrandenburg 04; Middle Rhine: Fortuna Köln; Rhineland: 1. FFC Montabaur; Saarland: SV Elversberg; Saxony: BSG Chemie Leipzig	Saxony-Anhalt: 1. FC Magdeburg; Schleswig-Holstein: Holstein Kiel; South Baden: FC Freiburg-St. Georgen; Southwest: SC Siegelbach; Thuringia: Saalfeld Titans; Westphalia: Borussia Dortmund; Württemberg: VfL Herrenberg

== Format ==
This year saw a format change, as the 21 regional cup winners, the five promoted teams from the Regionalliga and six teams from the 2. Bundesliga competed in a play-off round. Teams from the Bundesliga and the four-highest 2. Bundesliga teams entered in the first round. After that, the first round was played by the remaining 32 teams without restrictions.

== Schedule ==
The rounds of the 2025–26 competition were scheduled as follows:

Round	Matches
Play-offs	16–19 August 2025
First round	27–29 September 2025
Round of 16	15–17 November 2025
Quarter-finals	11 March 2026
Semi-finals	5–6 April 2026
Final	14 May 2026 at RheinEnergieStadion, Cologne

== Matches ==
Times up to 26 October 2025 and from 29 March 2026 are CEST (UTC+2). Times from 27 October 2025 to 28 March 2026 are CET (UTC+1).

=== Play-offs ===
The draw took place on 26 June 2025, with Renate Lingor drawing the matches. The play-offs are split into a North group and a South group. The twelve Bundesliga teams and the four best-placed teams from the 2. Bundesliga had a bye. The matches will take place between 16 and 19 August 2025.

16 August 2025	SV Elversberg	1–1 (a.e.t.) (4–2 p)	Fortuna Köln	Sankt Ingbert
14:00	Klein 85'	Report	Streller 38'	Stadium: Waldstadion Betzental; Attendance: 150; Referee: Sina Gieringer
	Penalties
	Walker (penalty scored); Kirps (penalty scored); Andres (penalty scored); Wittling (penalty scored)		(penalty scored) Kreitz; (penalty scored) Graßinger

16 August 2025	1. FFC Montabaur	3–0	SC Siegelbach	Montabaur
14:00	Theis 8', 13'; Helwing 90+2'	Report		Stadium: Sportplatz Eschelbach; Attendance: 165; Referee: Amelie Lainka

16 August 2025	SV 67 Weinberg	2–3 (a.e.t.)	Greuther Fürth	Aurach
15:00	Hofrichter 37'; Thornley 70' (o.g.)	Report	Mauch 41'; Wolfram 48' (pen.); Wölfel 111'	Stadium: Sportanlage Aurach; Attendance: 299; Referee: Marie-Theres Mühlbauer

16 August 2025	Karlsruher SC	0–4	SG Andernach	Bruchsal
16:00		Report	Schumacher 11'; Schraa 37'; Weingarz 45+2'; Kossmann 80'	Stadium: Sportzentrum; Attendance: 120; Referee: Paula Mayer

16 August 2025	BSG Chemie Leipzig	3–2	FC Freiburg-St. Georgen	Leipzig
17:00	Schneider 14'; Hüllmann 50'; Koster 80' (pen.)	Report	Bianchi 3'; Kniza 20' (o.g.)	Stadium: Alfred-Kunze-Sportpark; Attendance: 751; Referee: Franziska Wildfeuer

17 August 2025	Viktoria Berlin	2–1	VfL Bochum	Berlin
12:00	Zaugg 7' (o.g.); Urbanek 67'	Report	Way 46'	Stadium: Stadion Lichterfelde; Attendance: 1,400; Referee: Miriam Schwermer

17 August 2025	1. FC Neubrandenburg 04	0–8	VfR Warbeyen	Neubrandenburg
12:00		Report	Verkuijl 6', 73'; Guyens 29'; Manoukian 32', 54', 56'; Barbara 34'; Masseling 42'	Stadium: Jahnstadion; Attendance: 100; Referee: Tim Gerstenberg

17 August 2025	TSV Solingen-Aufderhöhe	0–6	SC Victoria Hamburg	Hilden
13:00		Report	Bothmann 7', 89', 90+2'; Üstün 9'; Paape 23', 86'	Stadium: Stadion Am Bandsbusch; Attendance: 400; Referee: Anna-Lena Weiss

17 August 2025	FSV Gütersloh	0–2	1. FC Magdeburg	Rheda-Wiedenbrück
14:00		Report	Bach 1'; Giese 71'	Stadium: Tönnies-Arena; Attendance: 150; Referee: Annika Kost

17 August 2025	FSV Babelsberg 74	1–1 (1–4 p)	ATS Buntentor	Potsdam
14:00	Löwe 36'	Report	Rößeling 21'	Stadium: Sportanlage Am Stern; Attendance: 240; Referee: Sophie Olivie
	Penalties
	Haeberlin (penalty scored)		(penalty scored) Meyer; (penalty scored) Watzlawik; (penalty scored) Hillje; (penalty scored) Zabel

17 August 2025	VfL Herrenberg	0–2	Kickers Offenbach	Herrenberg
14:00		Report	Klich 18' (pen.); Petrov 34'	Stadium: Volksbank-Stadion; Attendance: 300; Referee: Theresa Hug

17 August 2025	Saalfeld Titans	0–23	FC Ingolstadt	Saalfeld
14:00		Report	Schwarz 6', 12', 89'; Kömm 10', 37'; Kusch 15', 22', 32', 39', 45'; Winter 20', 88'; Penzkofer 24', 47', 68', 75'; Reischmann 35', 80'; Vidović 48', 57', 60', 85'; Hein 78'	Stadium: Stadion An den Saalewiesen; Attendance: 350; Referee: Franziska Wildfeuer

17 August 2025	VfB Stuttgart	0–2	Mainz 05	Stuttgart
14:00		Report	Pageler 4'; Bouziane 11'	Stadium: Rasenplatz PSV Stuttgart; Attendance: 1,000; Referee: Daniela Kottmann

17 August 2025	Borussia Pankow	0–6	Hannover 96	Berlin
15:00		Report	Obara 16'; Seliger 27'; Dose 39', 76', 80'; Seifert 47'	Stadium: Friedrich-Ludwig-Jahn-Sportpark; Attendance: 495; Referee: Maurice Schmidt

17 August 2025	Holstein Kiel	0–1	SV Meppen	Kiel
15:00		Report	Bröring 84'	Stadium: Stadion Waldwiese; Attendance: 239; Referee: Thao-Vy Nguyen

19 August 2025	Borussia Dortmund	3–1	Borussia Mönchengladbach	Dortmund
19:00	Leubner 40'; Enderle 69'; Marquardt 89'	Report	Arici 76'	Stadium: Stadion Rote Erde; Attendance: 3,320; Referee: Julia Boike

=== First round ===
The draw took place on 19 August 2025 with Turid Knaak drawing the matches. The matches took place between 27 and 29 September 2025.

27 September 2025	ATS Buntentor	0–11	VfL Wolfsburg	Bremen
13:00		Report	Endemann 7' (pen.), 48'; Küver 17'; Bergsvand 40'; Bussy 44', 68'; Huth 58'; Kielland 66'; Vallotto 69'; Saelen 75'; Zicai 80'	Stadium: SPA Stadtwerder; Attendance: 1,496; Referee: Lara Wolf

27 September 2025	1. FFC Montabaur	0–3	Turbine Potsdam	Westerburg
15:00		Report	Okuma 6', 22'; Lindner 40'	Stadium: Westerburg-Rasenplatz; Attendance: 363; Referee: Sina Gieringer

28 September 2025	FC Ingolstadt	2–2 (a.e.t.) (4–2 p)	1. FC Nürnberg	Ingolstadt
11:00	Wolski 56'; Penzkofer 120'	Report	Woś 41' (pen.); Kuya-Strobel 107' (o.g.)	Stadium: BSA Ingolstadt-Mitte; Attendance: 182; Referee: Davina Lutz
	Penalties
	Frank (penalty scored); Kuya-Strobel (penalty scored); Keul (penalty scored); Keitel (penalty scored)		(penalty scored) Ličina; (penalty scored) Pollak

28 September 2025	Hannover 96	0–4	SC Freiburg	Hanover
11:00		Report	Csillag 3'; Maas 7'; Nachtigall 48'; Birkholz 78'	Stadium: Eilenriedestadion; Attendance: 1,000; Referee: Annika Kost

28 September 2025	SV Elversberg	0–5	Bayer Leverkusen	Sankt Ingbert
12:00		Report	Vidal 14'; Wittling 19' (pen.); Kögel 23'; Bender 30'; Mickenhagen 89'	Stadium: Waldstadion Betzental; Attendance: 521; Referee: Naemi Breier

28 September 2025	Kickers Offenbach	0–7	SGS Essen	Offenbach
13:00		Report	Platner 37'; Van Belle 44', 55'; Potsi 57'; Elmazi 64'; Maier 72'; Flach 89'	Stadium: SANA Sportpark; Attendance: 524; Referee: Paula Mayer

28 September 2025	VfR Warbeyen	0–6	1. FC Köln	Kleve
13:00		Report	Leimenstoll 2'; Hegering 3', 35'; Jessen 62', 79'; Andrade 87'	Stadium: Bresserberg; Attendance: 640; Referee: Anke Hölscher

28 September 2025	SV Meppen	0–3	SC Sand	Meppen
14:00		Report	Reiniger 11', 36'; Farwick 78' (o.g.)	Stadium: Hänsch-Arena; Attendance: 430; Referee: Sarah Willms

28 September 2025	BSG Chemie Leipzig	0–5	Carl Zeiss Jena	Leipzig
14:00		Report	Jaron 30'; Margraf 40'; Andersson 51'; Mühlemann 68'; Gentile 75'	Stadium: Alfred-Kunze-Sportpark; Attendance: 1,164; Referee: Marie-Theres Mühlbauer

28 September 2025	SG Andernach	0–7	RB Leipzig	Andernach
14:00		Report	Hoffmann 6' (pen.), 35', 38'; Schimmer 17'; Boboy 32'; Kadowaki 77', 90'	Stadium: Stadion am Bassenheimer Weg; Attendance: 385; Referee: Julia Boike

28 September 2025	1. FC Magdeburg	0–3	Hamburger SV	Magdeburg
14:00		Report	Schulz 30'; Meyer 53'; Sierra 75'	Stadium: Avnet Arena; Attendance: 2,203; Referee: Miriam Schwermer

28 September 2025	Viktoria Berlin	1–3	Eintracht Frankfurt	Berlin
14:00	Metzker 40'	Report	Anyomi 36', 70'; Chiba 45+8'	Stadium: Stadion Lichterfelde; Attendance: 2,784; Referee: Riem Hussein

28 September 2025	Mainz 05	0–2	Union Berlin	Mainz
14:00		Report	Campbell 77', 88'	Stadium: Bruchwegstadion auf dem Wolfgang Frank Campus; Attendance: 620; Referee: Selina Menzel

28 September 2025	SC Victoria Hamburg	0–7	Werder Bremen	Hamburg
15:00		Report	Sternad 4', 20', 83'; Beck 22'; Walkling 30'; Wirtz 78'; Walkling 80'	Stadium: Sportpark Hinschenfelde; Attendance: 1,058; Referee: Celina-Sophie Böhm

28 September 2025	Greuther Fürth	1–2	TSG Hoffenheim	Fürth
15:00	Gruber 59' (pen.)	Report	Delacauw 8'; Grimm 27'	Stadium: Julius Hirsch Sportzentrum; Attendance: 450; Referee: Daniela Kottmann

29 September 2025	Borussia Dortmund	0–2	Bayern Munich	Dortmund
18:30		Report	Harder 28', 34'	Stadium: Stadion Rote Erde; Attendance: 15,755; Referee: Anna-Lena Heidenreich

=== Round of 16 ===
The draw took place on 5 October 2025 with Dietmar Hamann drawing the matches. The matches will take place on 15 and 16 November 2025.

15 November 2025	Union Berlin	0–1	Carl Zeiss Jena	Berlin
14:30		Report	Ihlenburg 45+1'	Stadium: Stadion an der Alten Försterei; Attendance: 4,664; Referee: Riem Hussein

15 November 2025	VfL Wolfsburg	3–1	SC Freiburg	Wolfsburg
16:30	Beerensteyn 23'; Szenk 49' (o.g.); Zicai 64'	Report	Nachtigall 86'	Stadium: AOK Stadion; Attendance: 1,745; Referee: Franziska Wildfeuer

16 November 2025	Turbine Potsdam	0–1	SGS Essen	Potsdam
13:00		Report	Meißner 89'	Stadium: Karl-Liebknecht-Stadion; Attendance: 512; Referee: Anna-Lena Heidenreich

16 November 2025	SC Sand	3–2	1. FC Köln	Willstätt
13:00	Schneider 2'; Reininger 22'; Fischer 66'	Report	Stolze 8'; Degen 37'	Stadium: Adams-Arena; Attendance: 1,235; Referee: Naemi Breier

16 November 2025	TSG Hoffenheim	4–6	Eintracht Frankfurt	Sinsheim
14:00	Grimm 9'; Harsch 20'; Janssens 55'; Ampoorter 90+3' (pen.)	Report	Freigang 5'; Blomqvist 23'; Reuteler 31', 57'; Memeti 35'; Anyomi 65'	Stadium: Dietmar-Hopp-Stadion; Attendance: 1,304; Referee: Davina Lutz

16 November 2025	FC Ingolstadt	0–3	Bayern Munich	Ingolstadt
14:00		Report	Dunst 48'; Schüller 56'; Padilla 90+7'	Stadium: ESV-Stadion; Attendance: 2,986; Referee: Annika Kost

16 November 2025	Hamburger SV	1–1 (a.e.t.) (4–2 p)	Bayer Leverkusen	Hamburg
15:00	Hillebrand 68'	Report	Mickenhagen 73'	Stadium: Volksparkstadion; Attendance: 3,993; Referee: Karoline Wacker
	Penalties
	Schulz (penalty scored); Mikolajová (penalty scored); Hillebrand (penalty scored); Stoldt (penalty scored)		(penalty scored) Kögel; (penalty missed) Mickenhagen; (penalty scored) Grant; (penalty missed) Kehrer

16 November 2025	RB Leipzig	1–1 (a.e.t.) (4–5 p)	Werder Bremen	Leipzig
16:00	Müller 7'	Report	Wirtz 45+2'	Stadium: Trainingszentrum am Cottaweg; Attendance: 1,473; Referee: Nadine Westerhoff
	Penalties
	Schasching (penalty scored); Magerl (penalty scored); Baum (penalty scored); Boboy (penalty scored); Oteng (penalty missed)		(penalty scored) D'Angelo; (penalty scored) Ulbrich; (penalty scored) Wirtz; (penalty scored) Mühlhaus; (penalty scored) Németh

=== Quarter-finals ===
The draw took place on 7 December 2025 with Friedhelm Funkel drawing the matches. The matches took place on 11 March 2026.

11 March 2026	VfL Wolfsburg	1–0	Eintracht Frankfurt	Wolfsburg
18:30	Huth 35'	Report		Stadium: AOK Stadion; Attendance: 2,183; Referee: Franziska Wildfeuer

11 March 2026	SGS Essen	1–0	Werder Bremen	Essen
18:30	Touon 44'	Report		Stadium: Stadion Essen; Attendance: 1,702; Referee: Riem Hussein

11 March 2026	Hamburger SV	0–3	Bayern Munich	Hamburg
18:30		Report	Imade 6'; Kett 66'; Padilla 88'	Stadium: Volksparkstadion; Attendance: 12,638; Referee: Miriam Schwermer

11 March 2026	Carl Zeiss Jena	4–1	SC Sand	Jena
18:30	Reuter 19'; Alcaide 68', 81', 89'	Report	Takizawa 40'	Stadium: Ernst-Abbe-Sportfeld; Attendance: 750; Referee: Nadine Westerhoff

=== Semi-finals ===
The draw took place on 11 March 2026 with Rachel Rinast drawing the matches. The matches will take place on 5 and 6 April 2026.

5 April 2026	Carl Zeiss Jena	0–0 (a.e.t.) (4–5 p)	VfL Wolfsburg	Jena
16:15		Report		Stadium: Ernst-Abbe-Sportfeld; Attendance: 2,114; Referee: Angelika Söder
	Penalties
	Bonsu (penalty scored); Ihlenburg (penalty scored); Reuter (penalty scored); Mühlemann (penalty scored); Sträßer (penalty missed); Gaißer (penalty missed)		(penalty scored) Minge; (penalty missed) Beerensteyn; (penalty scored) Peddemors; (penalty scored) Linder; (penalty scored) Huth; (penalty scored) Vallotto

6 April 2026	Bayern Munich	4–0	SGS Essen	Munich
15:30	Tanikawa 29'; Harder 40'; Imade 45+4', 73'	Report		Stadium: FC Bayern Campus; Attendance: 2,500; Referee: Fabienne Michel

=== Final ===
The match took place on 14 May 2026.

14 May 2026
16:00

VfL Wolfsburg	0–4	Bayern Munich
	Report	Stanway 45+2' (pen.); Harder 59'; Tanikawa 77'; Caruso 84'

RheinEnergieStadion, Cologne
Attendance: 46,064
Referee: Franziska Wildfeuer

VfL Wolfsburg	Bayern Munich

GK	1	(Germany) Stina Johannes
RB	2	(Norway) Thea Bjelde	(substituted off) 71'
CB	4	(Germany) Sophia Kleinherne	(substituted off) 71'
CB	16	(Germany) Camilla Küver
LB	39	(Germany) Sarai Linder
DM	6	(Germany) Janina Minge	(substituted off) 71'
RM	10	(Germany) Svenja Huth
CM	8	(Germany) Lena Lattwein	(substituted off) 58'
CM	5	(Netherlands) Ella Peddemors
LM	9	(Netherlands) Lineth Beerensteyn	(substituted off) 81'
CF	11	(Germany) Alexandra Popp (c)
Substitutes:
GK	21	(Germany) Martina Tufekovic
DF	3	(Netherlands) Caitlin Dijkstra	(substituted on) 71'
DF	15	(Netherlands) Janou Levels	(substituted on) 71'
DF	20	(Norway) Guro Bergsvand
DF	24	(Germany) Joelle Wedemeyer
MF	14	(Switzerland) Smilla Vallotto
MF	18	(Norway) Justine Kielland	(substituted on) 71'
FW	25	(Germany) Vivien Endemann	(substituted on) 58'
FW	28	(Germany) Cora Zicai	(substituted on) 81'
Manager:
(Germany) Stephan Lerch

GK	32	(Germany) Ena Mahmutovic
RB	7	(Germany) Giulia Gwinn		(substituted off) 87'
CB	4	(Iceland) Glódís Perla Viggósdóttir (c)
CB	5	(Sweden) Magdalena Eriksson		(substituted off) 82'
LB	20	(Germany) Franziska Kett	(yellow card) 68'	(substituted off) 82'
CM	15	(Ivory Coast) Bernadette Amani
CM	31	(England) Georgia Stanway
RW	10	(Germany) Linda Dallmann
AM	18	(Japan) Momoko Tanikawa		(substituted off) 78'
LW	17	(Germany) Klara Bühl
CF	21	(Denmark) Pernille Harder		(substituted off) 78'
Substitutes:
GK	1	(Germany) Maria Luisa Grohs
DF	3	(Denmark) Stine Ballisager
DF	19	(Austria) Katharina Naschenweng		(substituted on) 87'
DF	30	(Germany) Carolin Simon		(substituted on) 82'
DF	2	(Canada) Vanessa Gilles		(substituted on) 82'
MF	27	(Italy) Arianna Caruso		(substituted on) 78'
MF	28	(Austria) Barbara Dunst
FW	23	(Poland) Natalia Padilla
FW	29	(Spain) Edna Imade		(substituted on) 78'
Manager:
(Spain) José Barcala

Assistant referees:
Anne Uersfeld
Simone Jakob
Fourth official:
Davina Lutz
Video assistant referee:
Katrin Rafalski
Assistant video assistant referee:
Riem Hussein

Match rules

- 90 minutes
- 30 minutes of extra time if necessary
- Penalty shoot-out if scores still level
- Maximum of nine named substitutes
- Maximum of five substitutions
- Maximum of three substitution opportunities

== Top goalscorers ==
Goals scored in penalty shoot-outs are not included.

Rank	Player	Team	Goals
1	(Germany) Emma Kusch	FC Ingolstadt	5
1	(Germany) Nina Penzkofer	FC Ingolstadt	5
3	(Denmark) Pernille Harder	Bayern Munich	4
3	(Croatia) Paula Vidović	FC Ingolstadt	4
5	(Sweden) Olivia Alcaide	Carl Zeiss Jena	3
5	(Germany) Nicole Anyomi	Eintracht Frankfurt	3
5	(Germany) Jana Bothmann	SC Victoria Hamburg	3
5	(Germany) Julia Dose	Hannover 96	3
5	(Germany) Giovanna Hoffmann	RB Leipzig	3
5	(Spain) Edna Imade	Bayern Munich	3
5	(Netherlands) Aida Manoukian	VfR Warbeyen	3
5	(Germany) Pija Reininger	SC Sand	3
5	(Germany) Magdalena Schwarz	FC Ingolstadt	3
5	(Slovenia) Maja Sternad	Werder Bremen	3
