= 2026 ballon d'Or Féminin =

Annual association football award for women

2026 Ballon d'Or Féminin
- 2026 Ballon d'Or Féminin winner, Alexia Putellas
- Date: 26 October 2026
- Location: London Palladium, London
- Presented by: France Football
- Hosted by: Kate Scott; Thierry Henry
- Winner(s): (Spain) Alexia Putellas (3rd award)
- Website: ballondor.com

The 2026 Ballon d'Or Féminin (lit. '2026 Women's Golden Ball') was the 7th edition of the Ballon d'Or Féminin, an annual association football award presented by France Football to the best female footballer in the world. The award recognised the best female footballer based on her performances during the 2025–26 season. The ceremony took place on 26 October 2026 at the London Palladium in London, as part of the 70th Ballon d'Or ceremony.

Barcelona midfielder Alexia Putellas won the Ballon d'Or Féminin for the third time in her career, having previously won the award in 2021 and 2022. She finished ahead of Ewa Pajor and Khadija Shaw in the voting, receiving 618 points, 86 points more than Pajor, who finished second with 532 points. Shaw finished third with 344 points.

Putellas helped Barcelona win four trophies during the 2025–26 season, including the 2025–26 UEFA Women's Champions League. She was also named the UEFA Women's Champions League Player of the Season after scoring seven goals and providing seven assists in the competition. In July 2026, she joined English club London City Lionesses ahead of the 2026–27 season.

With this victory, Putellas became a three-time winner of the Ballon d'Or Féminin, joining fellow Spanish footballer Aitana Bonmatí as the only players to have won the award three times. Her victory also marked the sixth consecutive year that a Spanish player had won the women's award.

However, many people were shocked at the inequality of the ceremony, including Joan Laporta using the women's award to talk about the men. Additionally, 'Alexia Bonmatí' was named winner on social media.

== Voting results ==
The top three players in the 2026 Ballon d'Or Féminin voting were:

Top three
| Rank | Player | Nationality | Club | Points |
|---|---|---|---|---|
| 1 | Alexia Putellas | Spain | Barcelona | 618 |
| 2 | Ewa Pajor | Poland | Barcelona | 532 |
| 3 | Khadija Shaw | Jamaica | Manchester City | 344 |

== Ballon d'Or Féminin ==
Thirty players were nominated for the 2026 Ballon d'Or Féminin.

2026 Ballon d'Or Féminin
| Rank | Player | Nationality | Position | Club | Points |
|---|---|---|---|---|---|
| 1 | Alexia Putellas | Spain | Midfielder | (Spain) Barcelona | 618 |
| 2 | Ewa Pajor | Poland | Forward | (Spain) Barcelona | 532 |
| 3 | Khadija Shaw | Jamaica | Forward | (England) Manchester City | 344 |
| 4 | Melchie Dumornay | Haiti | Midfielder | (France) OL Lyonnes | 342 |
| 5 | Patricia Guijarro | Spain | Midfielder | (Spain) Barcelona | 221 |
| 6 | Caroline Graham Hansen | Norway | Forward | (Spain) Barcelona | 220 |
| 7 | Pernille Harder | Denmark | Forward | (Germany) Bayern Munich | 220 |
| 8 | Clàudia Pina | Spain | Forward | (Spain) Barcelona | 155 |
| 9 | Alessia Russo | England | Forward | (England) Arsenal | 155 |
| 10 | Temwa Chaŵinga | Malawi | Forward | (United States) Kansas City Current | 113 |
| 11 | Yui Hasegawa | Japan | Midfielder | (England) Manchester City | 89 |
| 12 | Klara Bühl | Germany | Forward | (Germany) Bayern Munich | 89 |
| 13 | Mariona Caldentey | Spain | Forward | (England) Arsenal | 69 |
| 14 | Wendie Renard | France | Defender | (France) OL Lyonnes | 21 |
| 15 | Cata Coll | Spain | Goalkeeper | (Spain) Barcelona | 21 |
| 16 | Mapi León | Spain | Defender | (Spain) Barcelona | 20 |
| 17 | Esmee Brugts | Netherlands | Midfielder | (Spain) Barcelona | 19 |
| 18 | Barbra Banda | Zambia | Forward | (United States) Orlando Pride | 18 |
| 19 | Tessa Wullaert | Belgium | Forward | (Italy) Inter Milan | 15 |
| 20 | Selma Bacha | France | Defender | (France) OL Lyonnes | 15 |
| 21 | Scarlett Camberos | Mexico | Forward | (Mexico) Club América | 14 |
| 22 | Manaka Matsukubo | Japan | Forward | (United States) North Carolina Courage | 9 |
| 23 | Momoko Tanikawa | Japan | Midfielder | (Germany) Bayern Munich | 8 |
| 24 | Kerstin Casparij | Netherlands | Defender | (England) Manchester City | 7 |
| 25 | Caroline Weir | Scotland | Midfielder | (Spain) Real Madrid | 7 |
| 26 | Alex Greenwood | England | Defender | (England) Manchester City | 7 |
| 27 | Rose Lavelle | United States | Midfielder | (United States) Gotham FC | 2 |
| 28 | Lorena | Brazil | Goalkeeper | (United States) Kansas City Current | 0 |
| 28 | Melvine Malard | France | Forward | (England) Manchester United | 0 |
| 28 | Vivianne Miedema | Netherlands | Forward | (England) Manchester City | 0 |

== Women's Young Talent of the Year ==
Five players were nominated for the 2026 Women's Young Talent of the Year.

2026 Women's Young Talent of the Year Nominees
| Rank | Player | Nationality | Position | Club | Points |
|---|---|---|---|---|---|
| 1 | Vicky López | Spain | Midfielder | (Spain) Barcelona | 21 |
| 2 | Clara Serrajordi | Spain | Midfielder | (Spain) Barcelona | 11 |
| 3 | Veerle Buurman | Netherlands | Defender | (England) Chelsea | 7 |
| 4 | Lily Yohannes | United States | Midfielder | (France) OL Lyonnes | 7 |
| 5 | Felicia Schröder | Sweden | Forward | (Sweden) BK Häcken | 2 |

== Women's Goalkeeper of the Year ==
Five goalkeepers were nominated for the 2026 Women's Goalkeeper of the Year.

2026 Women's Goalkeeper of the Year Nominees
| Rank | Player | Nationality | Club | Points |
|---|---|---|---|---|
| 1 | Cata Coll | Spain | (Spain) Barcelona | 85 |
| 2 | Ann-Katrin Berger | Germany | (United States) Gotham FC | 22 |
| 3 | Ayaka Yamashita | Japan | (England) Manchester City | 21 |
| 4 | Hannah Hampton | England | (England) Chelsea | 16 |
| 5 | Lorena | Brazil | (United States) Kansas City Current | 6 |

== Striker of the Year ==
2026 Women's Striker of the Year winner
| Rank | Player | Nationality | Position | Club | Goals |
|---|---|---|---|---|---|
| 1 | Charlyn Corral | Mexico | Forward | (Mexico) Pachuca | 49 |
| 2 | Diana Ordóñez | Mexico | Forward | (Mexico) Tigres UANL | 38 |
| 3 | Felicia Schröder | Sweden | Forward | (Sweden) BK Häcken | 36 |
| 3 | Khadija Shaw | Jamaica | Forward | (England) Manchester City | 36 |
| 5 | Pernille Harder | Denmark | Forward | (Germany) Bayern Munich | 35 |

== Women's Club of the Year ==
2026 Women's Club of the Year ranking
| Rank | Club | Total | Ballon d'Or | Points |
|---|---|---|---|---|
| 1 | (Spain) Barcelona | 8 | Alexia Putellas (ESP); Ewa Pajor (POL); Patricia Guijarro (ESP); Caroline Graham Hansen (NOR); Clàudia Pina (ESP); Cata Coll (ESP); Mapi León (ESP); Esmee Brugts (NED) | 95 |
| 2 | (France) OL Lyonnes | 3 | Melchie Dumornay (HAI); Wendie Renard (FRA); Selma Bacha (FRA) | 24 |
| 3 | (England) Manchester City | 5 | Khadija Shaw (JAM); Yui Hasegawa (JPN); Kerstin Casparij (NED); Alex Greenwood (ENG); Vivianne Miedema (NED) | 19 |
| 4 | (Germany) Bayern Munich | 3 | Pernille Harder (DEN); Klara Bühl (GER); Momoko Tanikawa (JPN) | 6 |
| 4 | (Mexico) Club América | 1 | Scarlett Camberos (MEX) | 6 |

== Women's Coach of the Year ==
Five coaches were nominated for the 2026 Women's Johan Cruyff Trophy.

| Rank | Coach | Nationality | Team(s) | Points |
|---|---|---|---|---|
| 1 | Pere Romeu | Spain | (Spain) Barcelona | 84 |
| 2 | Jonatan Giráldez | Spain | (France) OL Lyonnes | 26 |
| 3 | Andrée Jeglertz | Sweden | (England) Manchester City | 22 |
| 4 | Elena Sadiku | Sweden | (Scotland) Celtic (Sweden) BK Häcken | 9 |
| 5 | Nils Nielsen | Denmark | Japan | 9 |

== See also ==
- 2026 Ballon d'Or
