= Magdalena Eriksson =

Swedish footballer (born 1993)

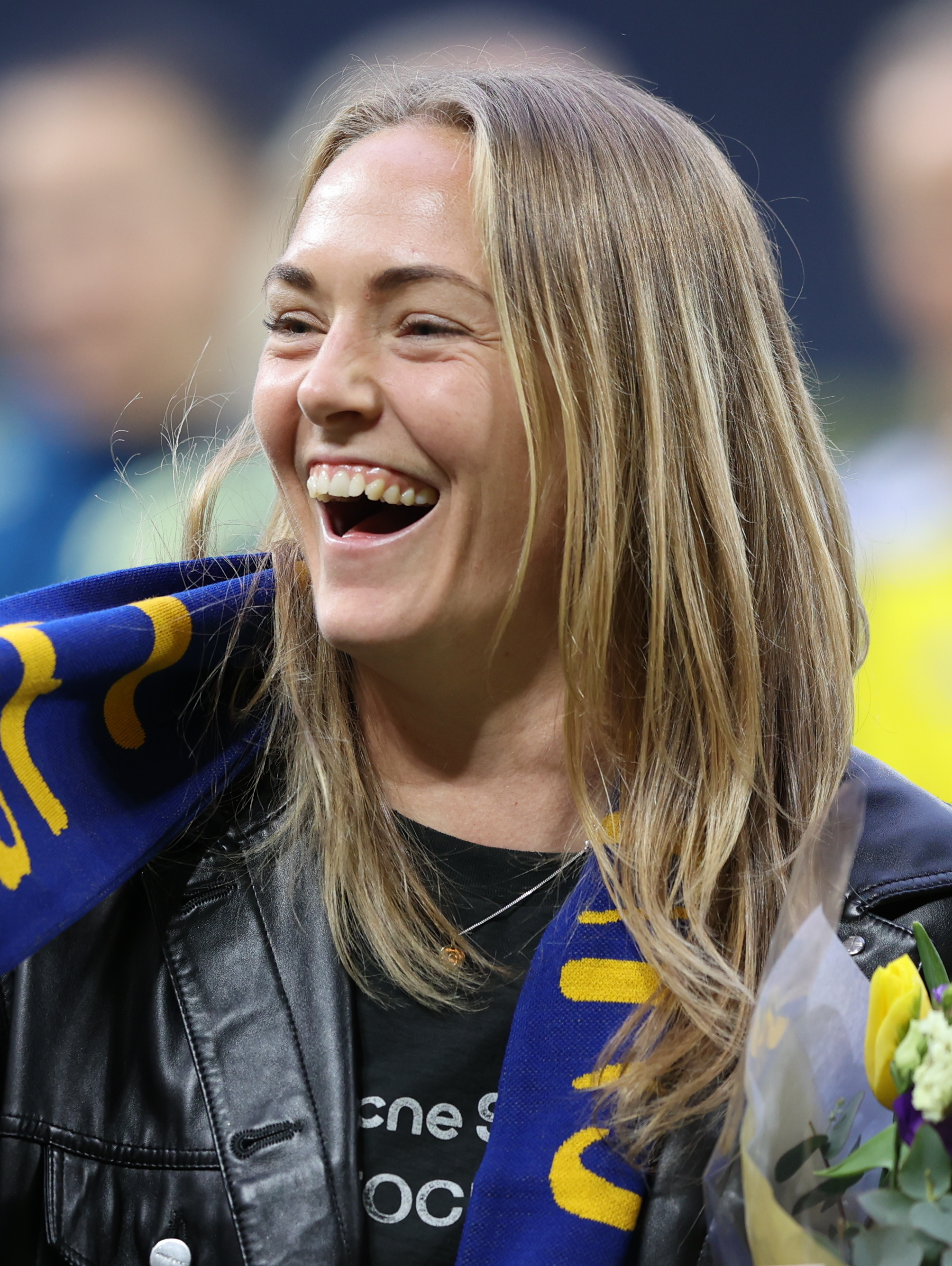
- Eriksson in 2026

Personal information
- Full name: Magdalena Lilly Eriksson
- Date of birth: 8 September 1993 (age 33)
- Place of birth: Stockholm, Sweden
- Height: 1.73 m (5 ft 8 in)
- Positions: Centre-back; left-back

Team information
- Current team: Bayern Munich
- Number: 5

Youth career
- Enskede IK
- 2009–2010: Hammarby IF

Senior career*
Years	Team	Apps	(Gls)
2011	Hammarby IF	19	(0)
2012	Djurgårdens IF	19	(1)
2013–2017	Linköpings FC	88	(5)
2017–2023	Chelsea	104	(8)
2023–	Bayern Munich	46	(7)

International career
2008	Sweden U15	2	(0)
2009	Sweden U16	8	(1)
2009–2010	Sweden U17	18	(3)
2011–2012	Sweden U19	24	(0)
2013	Sweden U23	4	(0)
2014–2025	Sweden	123	(14)
Medal record
Women's football
Representing Sweden
Olympic Games
Silver medal – second place	2016 Rio de Janeiro	Team
Silver medal – second place	2020 Tokyo	Team
FIFA Women's World Cup
Bronze medal – third place	2019 France
Bronze medal – third place	2023 Australia/New Zealand
UEFA Women's Under-19 Championship
Winner	2012 Turkey
- * Club domestic league appearances and goals as of 14 November 2026

Magdalena "Magda" Lilly Eriksson (also Ericsson; born 8 September 1993) is a Swedish professional footballer who plays for Frauen-Bundesliga side Bayern Munich. Primarily a centre-back, she can also play as a left-back. She represented Sweden at international level, and earned 123 caps between 2014 and 2025.

At the beginning of her professional career, Eriksson played for the Stockholm clubs Hammarby IF and Djurgårdens IF until she moved to Linköpings FC in 2013, where she won two cup titles and the league title in 2016 during her five years at the club.

In 2017, Eriksson moved to England and signed for Chelsea in the Women's Super League (WSL). There, she established herself as one of the best central defenders in Europe and was named team captain in 2019. With Chelsea, she won five WSL titles, and also reached the final of the UEFA Women's Champions League in the 2020–21 season. In 2020, she was named Swedish Footballer of the Year.

Eriksson, like her fiancée Pernille Harder, is also known for her LGBTQ+ advocacy and LGBTQ+ rights in sport.

== Club career ==
Eriksson began her football career with local team Enskede IK, but was encouraged by her father to join Hammarby IF to improve her game. Aged 17, she broke into Hammarby's first team in the 2011 Damallsvenskan season and made her debut against Umeå IK.

In November 2011, Eriksson left relegated Hammarby for their Stockholm rivals Djurgårdens IF. After scoring one goal in 19 appearances in the 2012 Damallsvenskan, she left Djurgården, who were facing relegation, and joined Linköpings FC.

In July 2017, after almost five years with Linköpings FC, Eriksson signed a two-year contract with Women's Super League team Chelsea Ladies. In August 2018, she extended her contract until 2021, and eventually became the team's captain in 2019. She extended her contract once again in November 2020, this time until 2023. On 9 December 2020, Eriksson made her 100th appearance for Chelsea in a 5–0 Champions League win over Benfica.

Her performances over the years, especially following Chelsea's WSL title-winning 2020–21 season, have seen Eriksson hailed as one of the best defenders in Europe. After six years with Chelsea, for whom she made over 180 appearances and won over 10 trophies, Eriksson left the club at the end of the 2022–23 season along with her partner Pernille Harder.

On 1 June 2023, Eriksson and Harder were unveiled as a new players of Frauen-Bundesliga club Bayern Munich, signing three-year contracts. In December's Champions League clash against Ajax, she suffered a broken metatarsal in her left foot, which required surgery. She returned to the team three months later, in March 2024, coming on as a second-half substitute during a 5–0 victory over RB Leipzig. At the end of the season she won her first Championship with Bayern. Eriksson's 2024/25 season with FC Bayern was very successful: the team won the double for the first time with the German championship and the DFB Cup and also won the newly created World Sevens Football small-field tournament. On 19th December, she extended her contract till 30 June 2028. On April 16th, she mentioned at Viaplay that she has also been working as a Scout for the men's team of FC Bayern Munich since September 2025. In the 2025/26 season, Eriksson successfully defended the domestic double—the German Championship and the DFB Cup—with Bayern. She contributed two goals and played a pivotal role in ensuring, that Bayern conceded only nine goals throughout the entire season.

== International career ==
As a Swedish under-19 international, Eriksson was part of the victorious squad at the 2012 U-19 European Championship. In November 2013, national team coach Pia Sundhage called her to a senior squad training camp at Bosön. Eriksson made her debut for the senior Sweden team in a 3–0 friendly defeat by France in Amiens on 8 February 2014. She was part of the Swedish squad that won silver at the 2016 Summer Olympics. Eriksson has since represented Sweden at every major tournament, namely UEFA Women's Euro 2017, 2019 FIFA Women's World Cup, 2020 Summer Olympics, UEFA Women's Euro 2022, 2023 FIFA Women's World Cup, and UEFA Women's Euro 2025. At the 2020 Olympics, she won the silver medal after Sweden lost to Canada in the final on penalties. In November 2025 she announced her retirement from the national team. In her statement, she explained that this was not a decision she had taken lightly, but it was one she had to make, as she was now prioritizing her body and health after some injury problems.

== Personal life ==
Eriksson's mother is of Finnish descent. She is openly lesbian and, since 2014, has been in a relationship with Danish international Pernille Harder. In July 2024, they announced their engagement after over a decade together.

Eriksson and Harder work with the charity Common Goal and pledged 1% of their salaries to help tackle social issues throughout football. The couple also both push for equality and LGBTQ+ rights in sport.

During her upbringing, she assumed her last name was spelled with a C because that was how her father spelled it. When she was 17 and looked in her passport she realised it was actually spelled with a K. As such, her last name is often misspelled as "Ericsson" rather than the correct "Eriksson".

Eriksson has a bachelor's degree in political science and took a course in feminist theory and intersectional power analysis.

== Career statistics ==
=== Club ===
As of match played 19 November 2026

Appearances and goals by club, season and competition
Club	Season	Leagues			National cup (Note: Includes Svenska Cupen Damer, Women's FA Cup)		League cup (Note: Includes FA Women's League Cup)		Continental (Note: Includes UEFA Women's Champions League)		Other		Total	
Club	Season	Division	Apps	Goals	Apps	Goals	Apps	Goals	Apps	Goals	Apps	Goals	Apps	Goals
Hammarby IF	2011	Damallsvenskan	19	0	2	0	—		—		—		21	0
Djurgårdens IF	2012	Damallsvenskan	19	1	2	0	—		—		—		21	1
Linköpings FC	2013	Damallsvenskan	19	2	5	0	—		—		—		24	2
Linköpings FC	2014	Damallsvenskan	16	0	4	0	—		—		—		20	0
Linköpings FC	2015	Damallsvenskan	22	1	5	0	—		6	1	1 (Note: Appearances in Svenska Supercupen)	0	34	2
Linköpings FC	2016	Damallsvenskan	21	2	5	2	—		—		1	0	27	4
Linköpings FC	2017	Damallsvenskan	10	0	0	0	—		—		—		10	0
Linköpings FC	Total		88	5	19	2	0	0	6	1	2	0	115	8
Chelsea	2017–18	Women's Super League	15	2	5	0	3	0	8	0	—		31	2
Chelsea	2018–19	Women's Super League	19	2	4	0	5	0	7	0	—		35	2
Chelsea	2019–20	Women's Super League	14	1	2	0	7	2	—		—		23	3
Chelsea	2020–21	Women's Super League	20	1	4	0	5	1	6	0	1 (Note: Appearance in Women's FA Community Shield)	0	36	2
Chelsea	2021–22	Women's Super League	16	1	2	1	0	0	6	0	—		24	2
Chelsea	2022–23	Women's Super League	20	1	5	0	2	0	9	0	—		36	1
Chelsea	Total		104	8	22	1	22	3	36	0	1	0	185	12
Bayern Munich	2023–24	Frauen-Bundesliga	13	4	3	0	—		4	1	—		20	5
Bayern Munich	2024–25	Frauen-Bundesliga	11	1	4	0	—		4	2	1 (Note: Appearance in DFB-Supercup)	0	20	3
Bayern Munich	2025–26	Frauen-Bundesliga	16	2	4	0	—		2	0	1	1	23	3
Bayern Munich	2026–27	Frauen-Bundesliga	6	0	1	0	—		3	0	1	0	11	0
Bayern Munich	Total		45	7	11	0	0	0	13	3	3	1	72	11
Career total			276	21	57	3	22	3	55	4	6	1	416	32

=== International ===
Scores and results list Sweden's goal tally first, score column indicates score after each Eriksson goal.

List of international goals scored by Magdalena Eriksson
No.	Date	Venue	Opponent	Score	Result	Competition
1	26 January 2016	Prioritet Serneke Arena, Gothenburg, Sweden	Scotland	2–0	6–0	Friendly
2	21 October 2016	Gamla Ullevi, Gothenburg, Sweden	Iran	2–0	7–0	Friendly
3	21 October 2016	Gamla Ullevi, Gothenburg, Sweden	Iran	4–0	7–0	Friendly
4	21 October 2016	Gamla Ullevi, Gothenburg, Sweden	Iran	7–0	7–0	Friendly
5	30 August 2018	Gamla Ullevi, Gothenburg, Sweden	Ukraine	2–0	3–0	2019 FIFA World Cup qualification
6	4 October 2019	Diósgyőri Stadion, Miskolc, Hungary	Hungary	1–0	5–0	UEFA Euro 2022 qualifying
7	17 September 2020	Gamla Ullevi, Gothenburg, Sweden	Hungary	4–0	8–0	UEFA Euro 2022 qualifying
8	22 October 2020	Gamla Ullevi, Gothenburg, Sweden	Latvia	4–0	7–0	UEFA Euro 2022 qualifying
9	30 July 2021	Saitama Stadium 2002, Saitama, Japan	Japan	1–0	3–1	2020 Olympics
10	21 September 2021	Gamla Ullevi, Gothenburg, Sweden	Georgia	2–0	4–0	2023 FIFA World Cup qualification
11	22 September 2023	Gamla Ullevi, Gothenburg, Sweden	Spain	1–0	2–3	2023–24 UEFA Nations League
12	27 October 2023	Gamla Ullevi, Gothenburg, Sweden	Switzerland	1–0	1–0	2023–24 UEFA Nations League
13	4 June 2024	Friends Arena, Stockholm, Sweden	Republic of Ireland	1–0	1–0	UEFA Euro 2025 qualifying League A
14	8 April 2025	Gamla Ullevi, Gothenburg, Sweden	Wales	1–0	1–1	2025 UEFA Nations League

== Honours ==
Linköpings FC

- Damallsvenskan: 2016
- Svenska Cupen: 2013–14, 2014–15

Chelsea

- Women's Super League: 2017–18, 2019–20, 2020–21, 2021–22, 2022–23
- Women's FA Cup: 2017–18, 2020–21, 2021–22, 2022–23
- FA Women's League Cup: 2019–20, 2020–21
- FA Community Shield: 2020
- UEFA Women's Champions League runner-up: 2020–21

Bayern Munich

- Frauen-Bundesliga: 2023–24, 2024–25, 2025–26
- DFB-Supercup Frauen: 2024, 2025, 2026
- DFB-Pokal: 2024–25, 2025–26
- World Sevens Football Tournament: 2025

Sweden U19

- UEFA Women's Under-19 Championship: 2012

Sweden

- Summer Olympic Games silver medal: 2016, 2020
- FIFA Women's World Cup third place: 2019, 2023
- Algarve Cup: 2018 (together with the Netherlands)

Individual

- Diamantbollen: 2020
- Fotbollsgalan – Swedish Defender of the Year: 2020, 2021
- FIFA FIFPro World XI: 2021
- FA WSL PFA Team of the Year: 2019–20, 2020–21
- The 100 Best Female Footballers in the World: 77 (2019), 25 (2020), 11 (2021), 43 (2022), 53 (2023)
- Nominated for the Ballon d'Or Féminin: (2021 11.place)
