= Juliane Wirtz =

German footballer (born 2001)

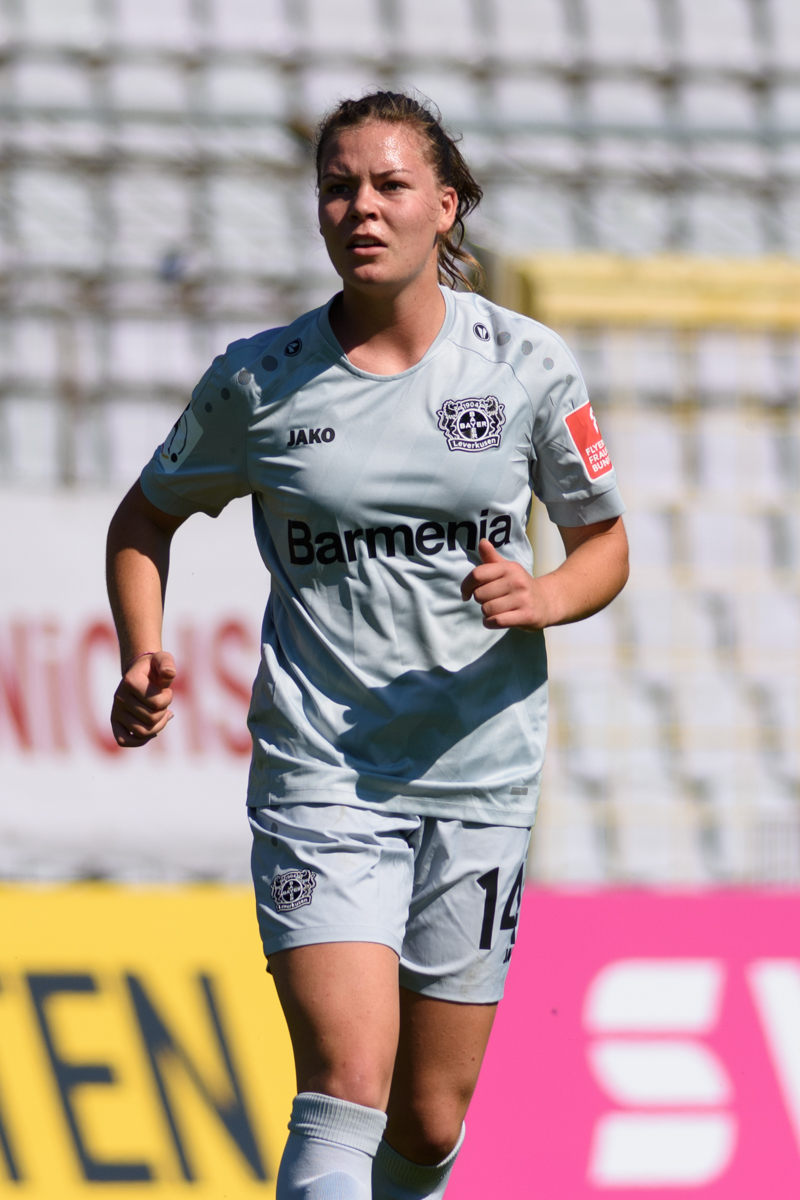
- Wirtz in 2019

Personal information
- Full name: Juliane Wirtz
- Date of birth: 22 August 2001 (age 25)
- Place of birth: Pulheim, North Rhine-Westphalia, Germany
- Height: 1.73 m (5 ft 8 in)
- Position: Midfielder

Team information
- Current team: Werder Bremen
- Number: 28

Senior career*
Years	Team	Apps	(Gls)
2017–2018	1. FC Köln	1	(0)
2018–2023	Bayer Leverkusen	89	(2)
2023–	Werder Bremen	68	(1)

International career
2015–2016	Germany U15	5	(0)
2016–2017	Germany U16	5	(0)
2017–2018	Germany U17	3	(1)
2019	Germany U19	10	(0)
- * Club domestic league appearances and goals as of 21 November 2026

Juliane Wirtz (born 22 August 2001) is a German footballer who plays as a midfielder for Frauen-Bundesliga club Werder Bremen.

== Career ==
Wirtz began to play football at the same club as her brother, Grün-Weiß Brauweiler. She moved to the youth team of 1. FC Köln in 2011 and signed a contract with Bayer 04 Leverkusen in 2018. Wirtz extended her contract with Bayer Leverkusen in April 2022. In summer 2023 Wirtz moved to Frauen-Bundesliga rivals Werder Bremen.

== Personal life ==
Juliane Wirtz's younger brother Florian is also a footballer.
