= Natalia Padilla =

Polish footballer (born 2002)

Natalia Padilla-Bidas
Personal information
- Full name: Natalia Alessandra Padilla-Bidas
- Date of birth: 6 November 2002 (age 24)
- Place of birth: Málaga, Spain
- Height: 1.74 m (5 ft 9 in)
- Position: Forward

Team information
- Current team: UD Tenerife
- Number: 9

Youth career
- CD Fuengirola FS
- –2020: Málaga

Senior career*
Years	Team	Apps	(Gls)
2020	Málaga B	1+	(1)
2020	Málaga	1+	(1)
2021–2023	Servette	44	(23)
2023–2026	Bayern Munich	12	(4)
2023–2024	→ 1. FC Köln (loan)	18	(2)
2024–2025	→ Sevilla (loan)	28	(11)
2026–	UD Tenerife	9	(4)

International career^{‡}
2018–2019	Poland U17	7	(1)
2019–2020	Poland U19	7	(4)
2021–	Poland	53	(13)
- * Club domestic league appearances and goals as of 17:05, 21 November 2026 (UTC) ‡ National team caps and goals as of 22:32, 13 October 2026 (UTC)

Natalia Alessandra Padilla-Bidas (born 6 November 2002) is a professional footballer who plays as a forward for Liga F club UD Tenerife. Born in Spain, she represents Poland at the international level.

== Early life ==
Padilla was born in Málaga to an American father of Spanish descent and a Polish mother. Her paternal grandmother was born in Morocco and emigrated to Spain.

== Club career ==
Padilla has played for Málaga CF in Spain and for Servette in Switzerland. In summer 2023, she transferred to Bayern Munich who then loaned her to 1. FC Köln for one season. Padilla joined Liga F club Sevilla on loan for the 2024–25 season.

On 24 June 2026, Padilla returned to Spain to join Liga F club UD Tenerife on a one-year deal.

== International career ==
Padilla made her senior debut for the Poland national team on 13 April 2021 in a 2–4 friendly home loss to Sweden.

She was selected in Poland's squad for the UEFA Women's Euro 2025 in Switzerland. On 12 July, Padilla scored her nation's first goal in a major international competition and provided two assists in a 3–2 win over Denmark, and was later named player of the match. Due to earlier defeats to Germany and Sweden, Poland exited the tournament after the group stage.

== Career statistics ==
=== International ===
As of match played 13 October 2026

Appearances and goals by national team and year
National team	Year	Apps	Goals
Poland	2021	9	0
Poland	2022	8	3
Poland	2023	9	3
Poland	2024	12	5
Poland	2025	11	2
Poland	2026	4	0
Total		53	13

Scores and results list Poland's goal tally first, score column indicates score after each Padilla goal.

List of international goals scored by Natalia Padilla
No.	Date	Venue	Opponent	Score	Result	Competition
1	6 October 2022	Estadio La Cartuja, Sevilla, Spain	Morocco	2–0	4–0	Friendly
2	11 November 2022	KSZO Municipal Sports Stadium, Ostrowiec Świętokrzyski, Poland	Romania	1–0	6–0	Friendly
3	11 November 2022	KSZO Municipal Sports Stadium, Ostrowiec Świętokrzyski, Poland	Romania	3–0	6–0	Friendly
4	6 April 2023	Stadion Miejski im. Władysława Króla, Łódź, Poland	Costa Rica	1–0	2–1	Friendly
5	22 September 2023	Georgios Kamaras Stadium, Athens, Greece	Greece	2–1	3–1	2023–24 UEFA Nations League
6	31 October 2023	Sportski centra FSS, Stara Pazova, Serbia	Serbia	1–0	1–1	2023–24 UEFA Nations League
7	31 May 2024	Ostseestadion, Rostock, Germany	Germany	1–0	1–4	UEFA Euro 2025 qualifying
8	12 July 2024	Stadion Schnabelholz, Altach, Austria	Austria	1–3	1–3	UEFA Euro 2025 qualifying
9	25 October 2024	Stadionul Arcul de Triumf, Bucharest, Romania	Romania	1–1	2–1	UEFA Euro 2025 qualifying play-offs
10	29 October 2024	Gdańsk Stadium, Gdańsk, Poland	Romania	2–0	4–1	UEFA Euro 2025 qualifying play-offs
11	29 November 2024	Gdańsk Stadium, Gdańsk, Poland	Austria	1–0	1–0	UEFA Euro 2025 qualifying play-offs
12	25 February 2025	Stadionul Arcul de Triumf, Bucharest, Romania	Romania	1–0	1–0	2025 UEFA Nations League
13	12 July 2025	Swissporarena, Lucerne, Switzerland	Denmark	1–0	3–2	UEFA Women's Euro 2025

== Honours ==
Servette

- Swiss Cup: 2022–23

Bayern Munich

- Bundesliga: 2025–26
- DFB-Pokal: 2025–26
