= Klara Bühl =

German footballer (born 2000)

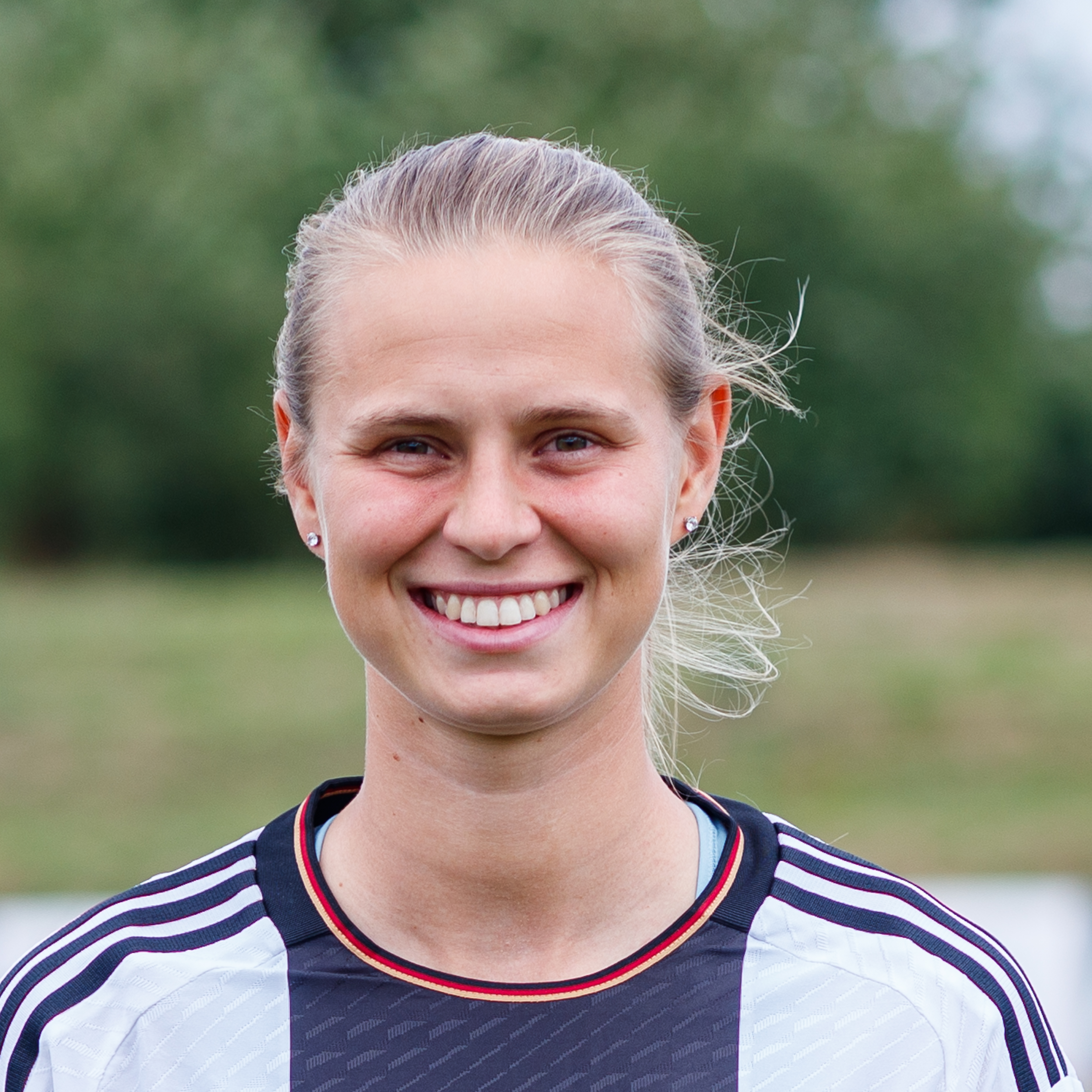
- Bühl with Germany in 2023

Personal information
- Full name: Klara Gabriele Bühl
- Date of birth: 7 December 2000 (age 25)
- Place of birth: Haßfurt, Germany
- Height: 1.73 m (5 ft 8 in)
- Position: Forward

Team information
- Current team: Bayern Munich
- Number: 17

Youth career
- 2010–2013: SpVgg Untermünstertal
- 2013–2016: SC Freiburg

Senior career*
Years	Team	Apps	(Gls)
2016–2020	SC Freiburg	70	(21)
2020–	Bayern Munich	130	(40)

International career^{‡}
2014–2015	Germany U15	6	(4)
2015–2016	Germany U16	4	(1)
2016	Germany U17	9	(4)
2017	Germany U19	11	(5)
2018	Germany U20	6	(1)
2019–	Germany	80	(31)
Medal record
Olympic Games
Bronze medal – third place	2024 Paris	Team
UEFA Women's Championship
Silver medal – second place	2022 England
UEFA Women's Nations League
Bronze medal – third place	2024 France–Netherlands–Spain
- * Club domestic league appearances and goals as of 14 November 2026 ‡ National team caps and goals as of 21:10, 13 October 2026 (UTC)

Klara Gabriele Bühl (German pronunciation: [ˈklaːʁa ˈbyːl]; born 7 December 2000) is a German professional footballer who plays as a left winger or forward for Frauen-Bundesliga club Bayern Munich and the Germany national team. She is widely recognised as one of the best wingers in Europe.

== Youth career ==
Bühl first played in various boys' teams at SpVgg Untermünstertal before moving to the youth department of the Bundesliga club SC Freiburg in the summer of 2013. From the 2014–15 season on, she competed with the B-Juniors in the Bundesliga South and reached the German Championship semi-finals with the 2016 team. Bühl scored all three goals for Freiburg in their 3–2 second leg victory against FSV Gütersloh, but the team missed out on the final after a 2–0 loss in the first leg.

== Club career ==
=== Freiburg ===
Ahead of the 2016–17 season, Bühl moved up early to Freiburg's senior women's team and made her debut aged just 15 on 11 September 2016 (2nd matchday) in a 5–0 home victory against MSV Duisburg in the Frauen-Bundesliga, replacing Lena Petermann off the bench. After she had been mainly used as a substitute in the 2016–17 campaign, Bühl established herself as a regular in Freiburg's starting eleven the following year.

The youngster scored her first three Bundesliga goals in a 7–0 away win over 1. FC Köln on 1 October 2017 (4th matchday), netting the goals for 3–0, 4–0 and 5–0. Bühl scored twice to help Freiburg reach the 2018–19 DFB-Pokal Frauen final and played five times, including all of the final, which was lost 1-0 to holders Wolfsburg.

=== Bayern Munich ===
In April 2020, it was announced that Bühl would sign for fellow Bundesliga club Bayern Munich. The following year, she signed a contract extension that would keep her at the club until 2025. Bühl scored 10 goals in all competitions in her first season as Bayern won the 2020-21 Bundesliga title. In the years to follow, the forward firmly cemented herself as the side's first-choice left-winger. On 22 March 2022, Bühl became the first Bayern women's player to score at the Allianz Arena during a UEFA Women's Champions League quarter-final against Paris Saint-Germain.

Bühl was part of the Bayern side which went a record-breaking 44 matches unbeaten in the Frauen-Bundesliga from December 2021 to October 2024. Die Frauen won both the 2022-23 and 2023-24 league titles respectively along the way, with Bühl registering over 20 assists across those two seasons.

On 25 August 2024, Bühl scored the winning goal as Bayern beat Wolfsburg 1-0 to win the 2024 DFB-Supercup, a competition held for the first time since 1997. She extended her contract at Bayern until 2027 on 11 March 2025. Bühl had a successful 2024-25 Frauen-Bundesliga campaign, registering the most assists (14) and the most direct goal involvements (21) in the league, contributing to Bayern's first-ever domestic double which was achieved during this season. Bühl was nominated for the 2025 Ballon d'Or nomination on account of the season's performance, ultimately ranking 19th among the 30 nominees. She was the only German to be nominated for the award that year.

Bühl started the 2025–26 season strongly: by mid-November, she had scored five goals and assisted a further 14, putting her at the top of Europe's top five leagues in terms of goal contributions.

== International career ==
=== Youth ===
Bühl made her debut for the national team on 23 April 2014, as part of the U-15 national team's friendly match against the Dutch team. She scored her first three goals on 28 October 2014, in a 13–0 win over Scotland. After four appearances for the U-16 national team, in 2016 she was the youngest player in the German squad for the European Championship, which took place in Belarus from 4 to 16 May 2016. She played in all five matches and won the Under-17 European Championship title after a 3–2 final victory in penalty shootout against the Spanish team. Bühl was also part of the German line-up for the 2016 U-17 World Cup in Jordan and reached the quarter-finals with the team where Spain lost 2–1.

In March 2017, she made her debut for the U-19 national team, with which she qualified for the Under-19 European Championship in Northern Ireland, taking place in the same year. Germany reached the semi-finals and faced France, with Bühl scoring the opening goal but the French winning 2-1 in the end.

The following year, Bühl was part of the German line-up for the U-20 World Cup in France, playing in all three group games as well as the quarter-final, which was lost 3–1 to eventual world champions Japan.

=== Senior ===
In December 2018, Bühl was called up to the senior squad for the first time by national coach Martina Voss-Tecklenburg for the winter training camp in Marbella from 14 to 21 January 2019. On 28 February 2019, she made her senior debut in a friendly match against France when she was substituted on for Verena Schweers in the 90th minute.

Bühl earned a place in Germany's squad for the 2019 World Cup. Bühl's impressive rise saw her awarded with the Fritz Walter Gold Medal in 2019, the DfB's top prize for youth footballers in Germany.

For Euro 2022, which was held in England, Bühl was a key player for the German national team, starting the first four games of the finals. She couldn't be used in both the semi-final and final due to testing positive for COVID-19. In the final, Germany lost 2-1 to England after extra-time and finished as runners-up. After the tournament, Bühl was voted into the "Eleven of the Tournament" by the UEFA coaching staff.

Bühl was included in Germany's squad for the 2023 World Cup. She scored and assisted in Germany's opener; a 6-0 win against Morocco, however they were disappointingly eliminated in the group stages. Following strong performances, Bühl won Germany's National Player of the Year award for 2023.

On 3 July 2024, Bühl was called up to the Germany squad for the 2024 Summer Olympics. Bühl helped Germany win a bronze medal in the Olympic women's football event at the Games in Paris. She started all six of the team's matches at the tournament, registering one goal and two assists. Germany beat world champions Spain 1-0 in Lyon in the Bronze medal match.

Bühl was named in the German squad for the UEFA Women's Euro 2025. She started every game at the Euros as Germany reached the semi-finals, where they lost to Spain in extra-time.

== Personal life ==
Bühl likes to crochet in her spare time. For the 2023 World Cup, she crafted the team's mascot; a koala dressed in a white jumper bearing the German flag. In a short time the crochet koala, called Waru, became very popular among fans. After the tournament, she donated the mascot to the German Football Museum in Dortmund.

For the 2024 Summer Olympics in Paris, Bühl crocheted a new mascot, an otter named Ottienne. The footballer is completing a distance learning course in media management at the IU International University of Applied Sciences. Bühl is also an ambassador for the Matthias Ginter Foundation, based in Freiburg.

In March 2025, Bühl was interviewed as the feature story for the first issue of "Queenzine"; the first-ever fanzine solely dedicated to the UEFA Women's Champions League.

In June 2025, Bühl announced the release of her first children's book, titled “My Journey to Becoming a National Team Player” ("Mein Weg zur Fußball-Nationalspielerin").

== Career statistics ==
=== Club ===
As of match played 19 November 2026

Appearances and goals by club, season and competition
Club	Season	League			DFB Pokal		Continental (Note: Includes UEFA Champions League)		Other (Note: Includes DFB-Supercup)		Total	
Club	Season	Division	Apps	Goals	Apps	Goals	Apps	Goals	Apps	Goals	Apps	Goals
SC Freiburg	2016–17	Frauen-Bundesliga	10	0	1	1	–		–		11	1
SC Freiburg	2017–18	Frauen-Bundesliga	18	7	2	0	–		–		20	7
SC Freiburg	2018–19	Frauen-Bundesliga	21	3	5	2	–		–		26	5
SC Freiburg	2019–20	Frauen-Bundesliga	21	11	2	1	–		–		23	12
SC Freiburg	Total		70	21	10	4	–		–		80	25
Bayern Munich	2020–21	Frauen-Bundesliga	19	8	4	1	5	1	–		28	10
Bayern Munich	2021–22	Frauen-Bundesliga	18	3	3	3	6	2	–		27	8
Bayern Munich	2022–23	Frauen-Bundesliga	22	5	4	2	10	3	–		36	10
Bayern Munich	2023–24	Frauen-Bundesliga	21	3	4	0	4	0	–		29	3
Bayern Munich	2024–25	Frauen-Bundesliga	22	7	4	0	8	2	1	1	35	10
Bayern Munich	2025–26	Frauen-Bundesliga	20	7	2	0	8	1	1	0	30	8
Bayern Munich	2026–27	Frauen-Bundesliga	8	6	1	0	5	3	1	2	15	11
Bayern Munich	Total		130	40	22	6	46	12	3	3	201	61
Career total			200	61	32	10	46	12	3	3	281	87

=== International ===
As of 13 October 2026

Appearances and goals by national team and year
National team	Year	Apps	Goals
Germany	2019	10	7
Germany	2020	3	0
Germany	2021	6	1
Germany	2022	12	6
Germany	2023	13	5
Germany	2024	18	8
Germany	2025	14	3
Germany	2026	4	1
Total		80	31

Scores and results list Germany's goal tally first, score column indicates score after each Bühl goal.

List of international goals scored by Klara Bühl
No.	Date	Venue	Opponent	Score	Result	Competition
1	31 August 2019	Kassel, Germany	Montenegro	4–0	10–0	UEFA Women's Euro 2021 qualifying
2	31 August 2019	Kassel, Germany	Montenegro	8–0	10–0	UEFA Women's Euro 2021 qualifying
3	5 October 2019	Aachen, Germany	Ukraine	1–0	8–0	UEFA Women's Euro 2021 qualifying
4	5 October 2019	Aachen, Germany	Ukraine	5–0	8–0	UEFA Women's Euro 2021 qualifying
5	5 October 2019	Aachen, Germany	Ukraine	6–0	8–0	UEFA Women's Euro 2021 qualifying
6	8 October 2019	Thessaloniki, Greece	Greece	5–0	5–0	UEFA Women's Euro 2021 qualifying
7	9 November 2019	London, England	England	2–1	2–1	Friendly
8	26 November 2021	Braunschweig, Germany	Turkey	8–0	8–0	2023 FIFA Women's World Cup qualification
9	9 April 2022	Bielefeld, Germany	Portugal	2–0	3–0	2023 FIFA Women's World Cup qualification
10	24 June 2022	Erfurt, Germany	Switzerland	1–0	7–0	Friendly
11	24 June 2022	Erfurt, Germany	Switzerland	3–0	7–0	Friendly
12	24 June 2022	Erfurt, Germany	Switzerland	4–0	7–0	Friendly
13	12 July 2022	London, England	Spain	1–0	2–0	UEFA Women's Euro 2022
14	3 September 2022	Bursa, Turkey	Turkey	2–0	3–0	2023 FIFA Women's World Cup qualification
15	24 July 2023	Melbourne, Australia	Morocco	3–0	6–0	2023 FIFA Women's World Cup
16	26 September 2023	Bochum, Germany	Iceland	1–0	4–0	2023–24 UEFA Women's Nations League
17	26 September 2023	Bochum, Germany	Iceland	4–0	4–0	2023–24 UEFA Women's Nations League
18	31 October 2023	Reykjavík, Iceland	Iceland	2–0	2–0	2023–24 UEFA Women's Nations League
19	1 December 2023	Rostock, Germany	Denmark	3–0	3–0	2023–24 UEFA Women's Nations League
20	28 February 2024	Heerenveen, Netherlands	Netherlands	1–0	2–0	2023–24 UEFA Women's Nations League
21	5 April 2024	Linz, Austria	Austria	1–2	3–2	UEFA Women's Euro 2025 qualifying
22	5 April 2024	Linz, Austria	Austria	2–2	3–2	UEFA Women's Euro 2025 qualifying
23	4 June 2024	Gdynia, Poland	Poland	3–1	3–1	UEFA Women's Euro 2025 qualifying
24	16 July 2024	Hanover, Germany	Austria	1–0	4–0	UEFA Women's Euro 2025 qualifying
25	16 July 2024	Hanover, Germany	Austria	4–0	4–0	UEFA Women's Euro 2025 qualifying
26	31 July 2024	Saint-Étienne, France	Zambia	2–0	4–1	2024 Summer Olympics
27	25 October 2024	London, England	England	3–0	4–3	Friendly
28	3 June 2025	Vienna, Austria	Austria	4–0	6–0	2025 UEFA Women's Nations League
29	24 October 2025	Düsseldorf, Germany	France	1–0	1–0	2025 UEFA Women's Nations League Finals
30	28 October 2025	Caen, France	France	2–1	2–2	2025 UEFA Women's Nations League Finals
31	13 October 2026	Bremen, Germany	Japan	2–1	2–1	Friendly

== Honours ==
SC Freiburg

- DFB-Pokal: runner-up 2018–19

Bayern Munich

- Bundesliga: 2020–21, 2022–23, 2023–24, 2024–25, 2025–26
- DFB-Pokal: 2024–25, 2025–26
- DFB-Supercup: 2024, 2025, 2026

Germany U17

- UEFA U-17 Women's Championship: 2016

Germany

- Summer Olympics bronze medal: 2024
- UEFA Women's Championship runner-up: 2022
- UEFA Women's Nations League third place: 2023–24

Individual

- UEFA Women's Championship Team of the Tournament: 2022
- Fritz Walter Medal Gold: 2019
- Silbernes Lorbeerblatt: 2024
- Germany women's national Player of the Year: 2023
