= Pernille Harder =

Danish footballer (born 1992)

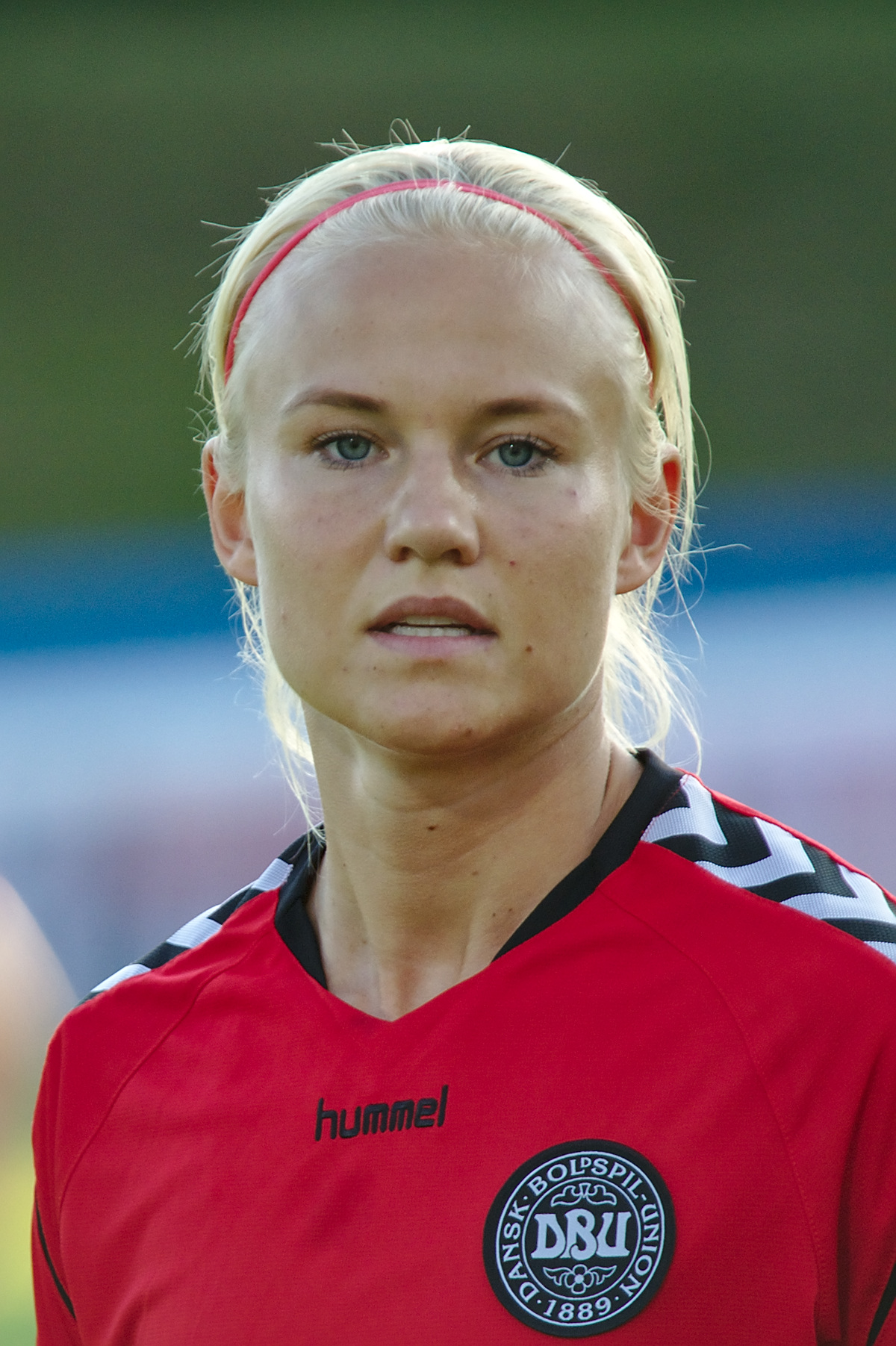
- Harder captaining Denmark in 2017

Personal information
- Full name: Pernille Mosegaard Harder
- Date of birth: 15 November 1992 (age 34)
- Place of birth: Ikast, Denmark
- Height: 1.69 m (5 ft 7 in)
- Positions: Attacking midfielder; forward

Team information
- Current team: Bayern Munich
- Number: 21

Youth career
- 1997–2005: Tulstrup-Faurholt
- 2005–2007: Ikast

Senior career*
Years	Team	Apps	(Gls)
2007–2010	Team Viborg		
2010–2012	IK Skovbakken	27	(22)
2012–2016	Linköping	88	(71)
2017–2020	VfL Wolfsburg	75	(68)
2020–2023	Chelsea	48	(24)
2023–	Bayern Munich	71	(42)

International career^{‡}
2007	Denmark U16	3	(0)
2007–2009	Denmark U17	23	(9)
2009–2011	Denmark U19	15	(13)
2009–	Denmark	175	(87)
Medal record
Women's football
Representing Denmark
UEFA Women's Championship
Silver medal – second place	2017 Netherlands	Team
- * Club domestic league appearances and goals as of 14 November 2026 ‡ National team caps and goals as of 12 October 2026

Pernille Mosegaard Harder (born 15 November 1992) is a Danish professional footballer who plays as an attacking midfielder or a forward for Frauen-Bundesliga club Bayern Munich and captains the Denmark national team. She is the all-time leading Danish goal-scorer, male or female, and has received the Danish Football Player of the Year award a record nine times. She has won the domestic league with her teams every year for eleven years straight, from 2015 to 2026; the first with Linköping, then 4 with VfL Wolfsburg, 3 with Chelsea and 3 with Bayern Munich. In September 2020, Harder became the world's most expensive female footballer following her transfer from VfL Wolfsburg to Chelsea, a record she held for two years. She is considered one of the best footballers in the world.

Harder has been nominated five times for the Ballon d'Or in 2018, 2019, 2021, 2025 and 2026, placing second with only a 6-point margin at the first ever awarding in 2018 while playing for VfL Wolfsburg. She was awarded the UEFA Women's Player of the Year Award in 2018 and 2020, the first player to win the award twice. English newspaper The Guardian named Harder as the best footballer in the world in 2018 and 2020, with Harder also the first player to twice receive this honour. In 2020 British football magazine Four Four Two (Note: The Ballon d'Or was not awarded in 2020 due to COVID-19, but many of the France Football voters awarded Harder this honour) named Harder the best footballer in the world.

Harder, like her fiancée Magdalena Eriksson, is also known for her LGBTQ+ advocacy in sport and beyond.

== Club career ==
=== Early career ===
Harder played for Team Viborg and IK Skovbakken in her native Denmark's A-Liga. Skovbakken had made Harder and her contemporary Sofie Junge Pedersen contracted players in April 2010, in recognition of their exceptional potential.

=== Linköpings FC ===
Harder chose Swedish club Linköpings FC for her next destination because she wanted a new challenge, but also because she wanted to remain in Scandinavia. In September 2013 she scored all four goals in Linköping's 4–1 win at relegation-bound Sunnanå SK.

In the 2015 Damallsvenskan season, Harder scored 17 goals in 22 appearances for Linköping, winning a series of national awards including Årets Anfallare (English: Forward of the Year) and Årets Allsvenska Spelare (English: League Player of the Year). At the annual awards gala, she shared the stage with male winner Zlatan Ibrahimović and was described as "hyper-talented" and "world-class" by Swedish national coach Pia Sundhage. Harder was also voted Danish Football Player of the Year in 2015. In June 2016, Harder was among 30 local worthies to be named in a Wall of Fame by Linköping Municipality.

Harder enjoyed further success in the 2016 Damallsvenskan season, retaining the League Player of the Year award. Her 23 league goals secured the Top Goalscorer award and helped Linköping win the Damallsvenskan title. By now a transfer target for the biggest clubs in women's football, Harder's agent announced in November 2016 that she would be leaving Linköping for a new challenge.

=== VfL Wolfsburg ===
In December 2016, it was announced that Harder had signed a two-and-a-half-year contract with VfL Wolfsburg running from January 2017. In all four seasons with the team, Harder won the Bundesliga and German Cup double. She was top scorer in the league twice: in the 2017–18 season with 17 goals scored, and in the 2019–20 season with 27 goals. Thanks to these performances, she won the UEFA Women's Player of the Year Award twice for the 2017-18 and 2019-20 seasons. She also played in two Champions League finals (2018 and 2020), losing both to Lyon. In 2020, she was elected best forward of the Champions League and best player of the German Championship.

=== Chelsea ===
On 1 September 2020, Harder signed for Chelsea on a three-year contract for a world-record fee for a female footballer, reportedly in excess of £250,000. In the 2020–21 Champions League quarter-finals, she scored in both legs against her former club VfL Wolfsburg. In the group stage of the 2022–23 Champions League she scored a hattrick against KF Vllaznia Shkodër. On 18 November 2022 she suffered a serious thigh injury on national team duty against Austria that required surgery and sidelining her for five months. She made her comeback against Barcelona in the Champions League semi-final on 22 April 2023. In the FA Cup final against Manchester United she gave the assist for the victory goal for Sam Kerr in front of a record crowd of 77,390 people.

=== Bayern Munich ===
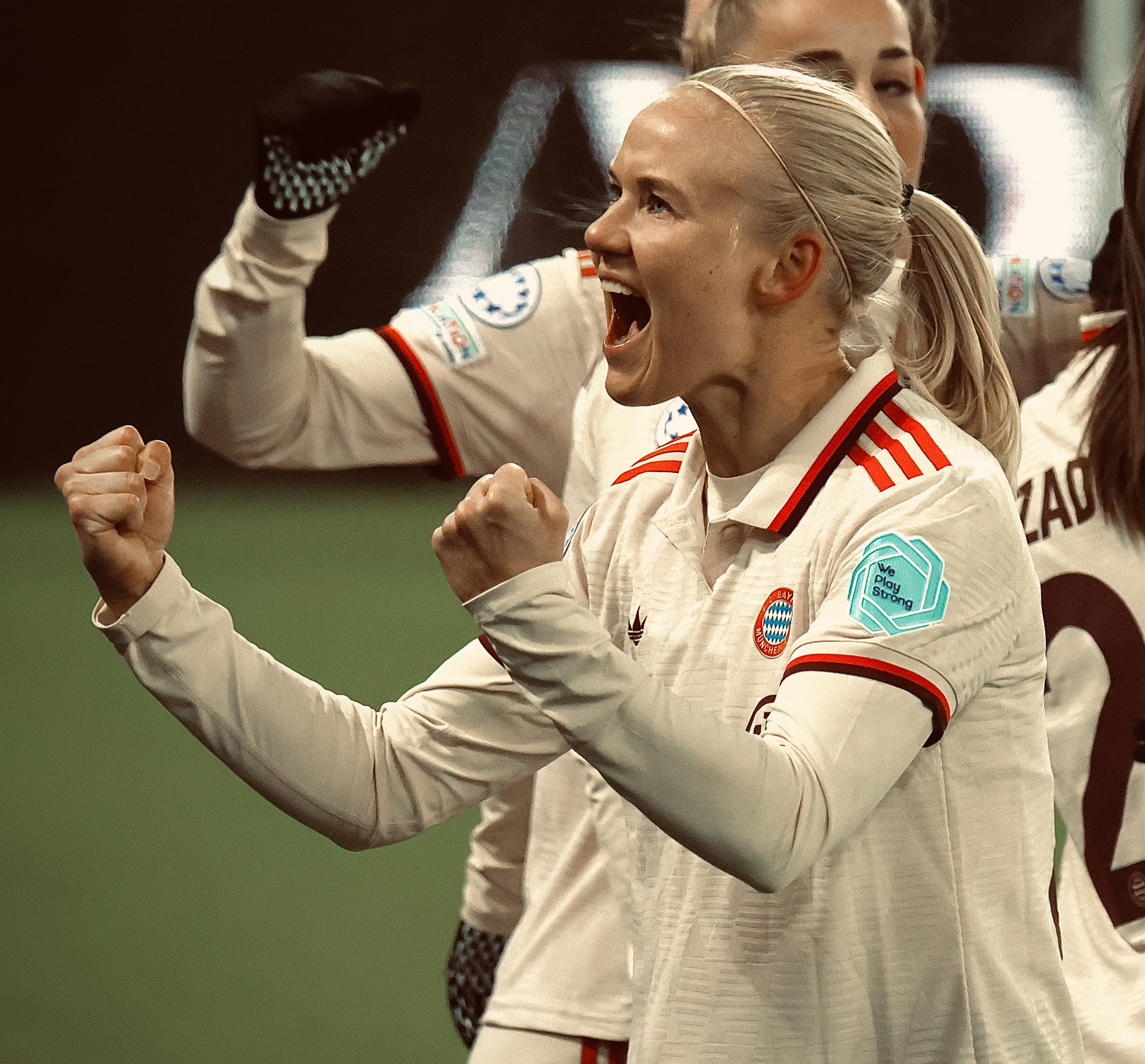
Harder with Bayern Munich in 2024

On 1 June 2023, it was announced that Harder, along with partner and former Chelsea teammate Magdalena Eriksson, had signed for Bayern Munich on a three-year deal. She made her debut for Bayern against SC Freiburg and scored her first goal against 1. FC Köln. In the next game against SGS Essen, she scored her second goal, but collided with the goalkeeper and was subbed out with a knee injury after 17 minutes. With a medial collateral ligament injury she was out for over two month and made her comeback in December 2023 against 1. FC Nürnberg. After the winter break, she quickly returned to her old form. She provided assists against Freiburg and Frankfurt, and scored twice against Leipzig. In the top match against her former club, she scored to make it 1–0 and set up Lea Schüller for the 3–0 goal with a through ball. Harder scored a hat trick against Nuremberg, and on the final matchday, away against TSG Hoffenheim, she scored again. Bayern thus won its sixth German championship. She finished the season as the club's second-best goalscorer alongside Jovana Damnjanović, with nine league goals and 13 goals in total. Harder's 2024–25 season with Bayern was very successful: the team won the double for the first time with the German championship and the DFB Pokal. With this title win, Harder made football history, as she is the first female footballer to have won the championship ten years in a row in different leagues. She was the club's top scorer with 23 goals in all competitions including 14 league goals and was named player of the season. In May 2025, she also won the newly created World Sevens Football tournament on a small field with Bayern.

On 19 December 2025, Harder and Eriksson extended their contracts until 30 June 2028.

In the 2025/26 season, Harder successfully defended the domestic double—the German Championship and the DFB Cup—with Bayern, and was Bayern's top scorer with 28 goals in all competitions, including 16 league goals, 8 goals in the Champions League, and 4 goals in the domestic cup. She was the sole Bayern player to be included in UEFA's Champions League Team of the Season.

== International career ==
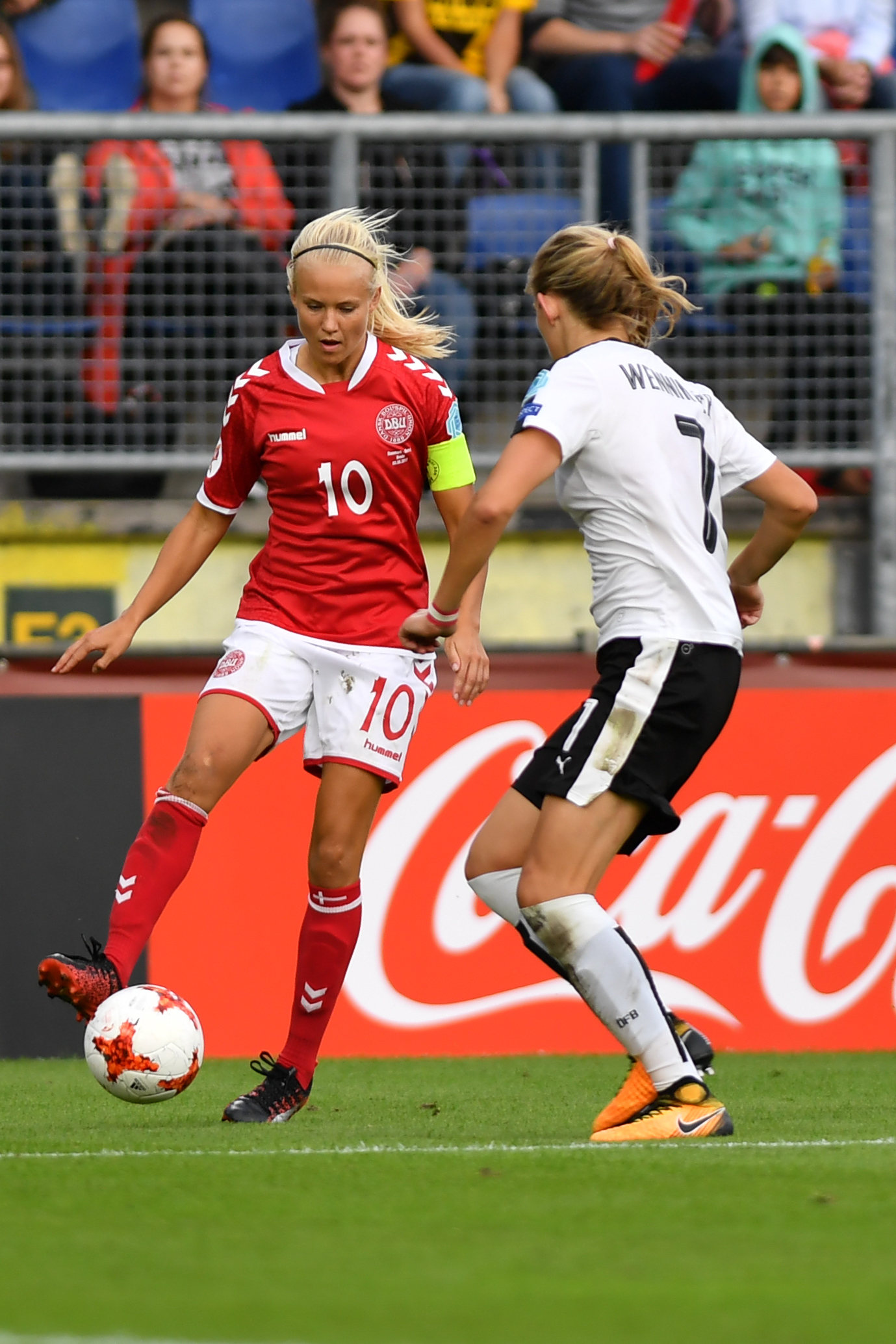
Harder in the Euro 2017 semifinal against Austria.

At the inaugural 2008 U-17 World Cup in New Zealand, Harder was part of the Denmark team who won their group before losing 4–0 to eventual champions North Korea in the quarter-final. Still 16 years old, she contributed a hat-trick to a crushing 15–0 win over Georgia in her senior international debut in October 2009, and she has continued to score regularly for the Danish team ever since.

Harder scored further hat-tricks against Austria and Armenia in 2011 and Russia in 2013. She was named in national coach Kenneth Heiner-Møller's Denmark squad for Euro 2013. With nine goals she had been the team's top goalscorer in qualifying.

She played in the Algarve Cup in 2011, 2012, 2013, and 2015, but had an injury in 2014. In October 2013, Harder won her 50th cap for Denmark in a 1–1 draw with Serbia. She scored Denmark's goal in the match. In March 2016, Harder was appointed captain of the national team.

In 2017, she was named in national coach Nils Nielsen's Denmark squad for the Euro 2017. She captained the team to the final and scored a goal in Denmark's 4–2 defeat by hosts the Netherlands. She was voted runner-up to Lieke Martens in the UEFA Women's Player of the Year Award for 2016–17. On 16 September 2021, she broke Merete Pedersen's 12.5-year-long national record, becoming the record goalscorer of the Denmark national team, with 66 goals in her 129 games. In the successful campaign to qualify for the Euro 2022, she played in all ten games and scored eight goals. She was called up for the Euro 2022 and scored the only goal for Denmark, but the team was eliminated in the group stage.

In qualifying for the 2023 World Cup, she played four times and scored two goals.

In July 2023, she was named to the final roster for the 2023 FIFA World Cup. She scored one goal and provided one assist, but Denmark was knocked out in the round of 16 by Australia. It was the first time since 1995 that Denmark reached the knockout stage at a World Cup.

On 20 June 2025, she was nominated for the UEFA European Championship, but Denmark was eliminated in the group stage. In the last game against Poland, she had to be substituted after just 25 minutes due to an injury, when the score was 0–2.

== Personal life ==
Since May 2014, Harder has been in a relationship with current Bayern Munich teammate and former Swedish international, Magdalena Eriksson. On 21 July 2024 they announced their engagement after more than a decade together.

She and Eriksson work with the charity Common Goal and pledged 1% of their salaries to help tackle social issues throughout football. The couple also advocates for equality and LGBTQ+ rights in sport.

She has a Master's degree in Business administration.

She grew up as an avid Manchester United fan.

== Career statistics ==
=== Club ===
As of match played 19 November 2026.

Appearances and goals by club, season and competition
Club	Season	League			National cup (Note: Includes Svenska Cupen, DFB-Pokal and FA Cup)		League cup (Note: Includes FA Women's League Cup)		Continental (Note: Includes UEFA Champions League)		Other (Note: Includes Svenska Supercupen and DFB-Supercup)		Total	
Club	Season	Division	Apps	Goals	Apps	Goals	Apps	Goals	Apps	Goals	Apps	Goals	Apps	Goals
IK Skovbakken	2010–11	Elitedivisionen	18	12	4	6	—		—		—		22	18
IK Skovbakken	2011–12	Elitedivisionen	18	13	3	4	—		—		—		21	17
IK Skovbakken	Total		36	25	7	10	0	0	0	0	0	0	43	35
Linköping	2012	Damallsvenskan	10	3	0	0	—		—		—		10	3
Linköping	2013	Damallsvenskan	21	18	4	2	—		—		—		25	20
Linköping	2014	Damallsvenskan	14	9	6	10	—		6	1	—		26	20
Linköping	2015	Damallsvenskan	21	17	5	3	—		—	—	1	0	27	20
Linköping	2016	Damallsvenskan	22	24	1	4	—		—		1	0	24	28
Linköping	Total		88	71	16	19	0	0	6	1	2	0	112	91
VfL Wolfsburg	2016–17	Bundesliga	12	6	3	2	—		2	0	—		17	8
VfL Wolfsburg	2017–18	Bundesliga	21	17	3	2	—		8	8	—		32	27
VfL Wolfsburg	2018–19	Bundesliga	21	18	5	5	—		6	8	—		32	31
VfL Wolfsburg	2019–20	Bundesliga	21	27	5	2	—		7	9	—		33	38
VfL Wolfsburg	Total		75	68	16	11	0	0	23	25	0	0	114	104
Chelsea	2019–20	FA WSL	0	0	1	0	0	0	0	0	0		1	0
Chelsea	2020–21	FA WSL	22	10	3	1	4	3	9	4	—		38	18
Chelsea	2021–22	FA WSL	16	6	4	3	3	4	4	2	—		27	15
Chelsea	2022–23	WSL	10	8	1	0	0	0	4	3	–		15	11
Chelsea	Total		48	24	9	4	7	7	17	9	0	0	81	44
Bayern Munich	2023–24	Bundesliga	15	9	5	4	—		3	0	—		23	13
Bayern Munich	2024–25	Bundesliga	22	14	5	3	—		8	6	1	0	36	23
Bayern Munich	2025–26	Bundesliga	24	16	4	4	—		10	8	1	0	39	28
Bayern Munich	2026–27	Bundesliga	10	3	2	1	—		5	2	1	0	18	6
Bayern Munich	Total		71	42	16	12	0	0	26	16	3	0	116	70
Career total			318	230	64	56	7	7	72	51	5	0	466	344

=== International ===
Scores and results list Denmark's goal tally first, score column indicates score after each Harder goal.

List of international goals scored by Pernille Harder
No.	Date	Location	Opponent	Score	Result	Competition
1	24 October 2009	Vejle, Denmark	Georgia	3–0	15–0	2011 FIFA Women's World Cup qualification
2	24 October 2009	Vejle, Denmark	Georgia	7–0	15–0	2011 FIFA Women's World Cup qualification
3	24 October 2009	Vejle, Denmark	Georgia	12–0	15–0	2011 FIFA Women's World Cup qualification
4	3 October 2010	Vejle, Denmark	Switzerland	1–3	1–3	2011 FIFA Women's World Cup qualification
5	21 September 2011	Yerevan, Armenia	Armenia	3–0	5–0	UEFA Women's Euro 2013 qualification
6	22 October 2011	Vejle, Denmark	Austria	1–0	3–0	UEFA Women's Euro 2013 qualification
7	22 October 2011	Vejle, Denmark	Austria	2–0	3–0	UEFA Women's Euro 2013 qualification
8	22 October 2011	Vejle, Denmark	Austria	3–0	3–0	UEFA Women's Euro 2013 qualification
9	23 November 2011	Vejle, Denmark	Armenia	4–0	11–0	UEFA Women's Euro 2013 qualification
10	23 November 2011	Vejle, Denmark	Armenia	6–0	11–0	UEFA Women's Euro 2013 qualification
11	23 November 2011	Vejle, Denmark	Armenia	10–0	11–0	UEFA Women's Euro 2013 qualification
12	8 December 2011	São Paulo, Brazil	Chile	4–0	4–0	2011 International Tournament of São Paulo
13	11 December 2011	São Paulo, Brazil	Italy	2–2	2–2	2011 International Tournament of São Paulo
14	13 December 2011	São Paulo, Brazil	Brazil	1–0	1–2	2011 International Tournament of São Paulo
15	4 April 2012	Prague, Czech Republic	Czech Republic	2–0	2–0	UEFA Women's Euro 2013 qualification
16	19 September 2012	Vejle, Denmark	Portugal	1–0	2–0	UEFA Women's Euro 2013 qualification
17	9 December 2012	São Paulo, Brazil	Mexico	3–0	5–0	2012 International Tournament of São Paulo
18	13 March 2013	Lagos, Portugal	Mexico	2–0	3–0	2013 Algarve Cup
19	8 April 2013	Horsens, Denmark	Russia	3–1	5–1	Friendly
20	8 April 2013	Horsens, Denmark	Russia	4–1	5–1	Friendly
21	8 April 2013	Horsens, Denmark	Russia	5–1	5–1	Friendly
22	25 September 2013	Budapest, Hungary	Hungary	2–0	4–0	Friendly
23	25 September 2013	Budapest, Hungary	Hungary	4–0	4–0	Friendly
24	26 October 2013	Belgrade, Serbia	Serbia	1–0	1–1	2015 FIFA Women's World Cup qualification
25	24 November 2013	Valletta, Malta	Malta	3–0	5–0	2015 FIFA Women's World Cup qualification
26	19 June 2014	Tel Aviv, Israel	Israel	2–0	5–0	2015 FIFA Women's World Cup qualification
27	21 August 2014	Reykjavík, Iceland	Iceland	1–0	1–0	2015 FIFA Women's World Cup qualification
28	11 March 2015	Albufeira, Portugal	Norway	1–3	2–5	2015 Algarve Cup
29	11 March 2015	Albufeira, Portugal	Norway	2–5	2–5	2015 Algarve Cup
30	8 April 2015	Stockholm, Sweden	Sweden	3–3	3–3	Friendly
31	22 October 2015	Viborg, Denmark	Moldova	2–0	4–0	UEFA Women's Euro 2017 qualification
32	2 June 2016	Viborg, Denmark	Slovakia	1–0	4–0	UEFA Women's Euro 2017 qualification
33	7 June 2016	Viborg, Denmark	Poland	2–0	6–0	UEFA Women's Euro 2017 qualification
34	7 June 2016	Viborg, Denmark	Poland	4–0	6–0	UEFA Women's Euro 2017 qualification
35	15 September 2016	Chișinău, Moldova	Moldova	2–0	5–0	UEFA Women's Euro 2017 qualification
36	15 September 2016	Chișinău, Moldova	Moldova	3–0	5–0	UEFA Women's Euro 2017 qualification
37	15 September 2016	Chișinău, Moldova	Moldova	5–0	5–0	UEFA Women's Euro 2017 qualification
38	28 November 2016	Turbize, Belgium	Belgium	2–0	3–1	Friendly
39	28 November 2016	Turbize, Belgium	Belgium	3–1	3–1	Friendly
40	20 January 2017	Larnaca, Cyprus	Scotland	1–0	2–2	Friendly
41	6 March 2017	Vila Real de Santo António, Portugal	Russia	1–0	6–1	2016 Algarve Cup
42	6 March 2017	Vila Real de Santo António, Portugal	Russia	2–1	6–1	2016 Algarve Cup
43	6 March 2017	Vila Real de Santo António, Portugal	Russia	4–1	6–1	2016 Algarve Cup
44	8 March 2017	Albufeira, Portugal	Australia	1–1	1–1	2016 Algarve Cup
45	11 April 2017	Slagelse, Denmark	Finland	1–0	5–0	Friendly
46	1 July 2017	Gladsaxe, Denmark	England	1–1	1–2	Friendly
47	6 August 2017	Enschede, Netherlands	Netherlands	2–2	2–4	UEFA Women's Euro 2017
48	19 August 2017	Győr, Hungary	Hungary	3–1	6–1	2019 FIFA Women's World Cup qualification
49	24 October 2017	Zaprešić, Croatia	Croatia	1–0	4–0	2019 FIFA Women's World Cup qualification
50	24 October 2017	Zaprešić, Croatia	Croatia	2–0	4–0	2019 FIFA Women's World Cup qualification
51	2 March 2018	Vila Real de Santo António, Portugal	Netherlands	1–0	2–3	2018 Algarve Cup
52	8 June 2018	Lviv, Ukraine	Ukraine	3–0	5–1	2019 FIFA Women's World Cup qualification
53	12 June 2018	Viborg, Denmark	Hungary	5–1	5–1	2019 FIFA Women's World Cup qualification
54	4 March 2019	Vila Real de Santo António, Portugal	China	1–0	1–0	2019 Algarve Cup
55	29 August 2019	Viborg, Denmark	Malta	2–0	8–0	UEFA Women's Euro 2021 qualifying
56	3 September 2019	Ramat Gan, Israel	Israel	3–0	3–0	UEFA Women's Euro 2021 qualifying
57	12 November 2019	Viborg, Denmark	Georgia	7–0	14–0	UEFA Women's Euro 2021 qualifying
58	12 November 2019	Viborg, Denmark	Georgia	10–0	14–0	UEFA Women's Euro 2021 qualifying
59	12 November 2019	Viborg, Denmark	Georgia	12–0	14–0	UEFA Women's Euro 2021 qualifying
60	4 March 2020	Parchal, Portugal	Norway	1–0	1–2	2020 Algarve Cup
61	10 March 2020	Lagos, Portugal	Belgium	1–0	4–0	2020 Algarve Cup
62	22 September 2020	Ta' Qali, Malta	Malta	5–0	8–0	UEFA Women's Euro 2021 qualifying
63	21 October 2020	Viborg, Denmark	Israel	1–0	4–0	UEFA Women's Euro 2021 qualifying
64	21 October 2020	Viborg, Denmark	Israel	2–0	4–0	UEFA Women's Euro 2021 qualifying
65	13 April 2021	Cardiff City Stadium, Cardiff	Wales	1–0	1–1	Friendly
66	16 September 2021	Viborg, Denmark	Malta	4–0	7–0	2023 FIFA Women's World Cup qualification
67	21 October 2021	Viborg, Denmark	Bosnia and Herzegovina	7–0	8–0	2023 FIFA Women's World Cup qualification
68	12 June 2022	Wiener Neustadt, Austria	Austria	1–1	2–1	Friendly
69	12 July 2022	Milton Keynes, England	Finland	1–0	1–0	UEFA Women's Euro 2022
70	1 September 2022	Viborg, Denmark	Montenegro	2–1	5–1	2023 FIFA Women's World Cup qualification
71	1 July 2023	Perth, Australia	Haiti	1–0	2–0	2023 FIFA Women's World Cup
72	26 September 2023	Cardiff, Wales	Wales	1–0	5–1	2023–24 UEFA Women's Nations League
73	26 September 2023	Cardiff, Wales	Wales	2–0	5–1	2023–24 UEFA Women's Nations League
74	26 September 2023	Cardiff, Wales	Wales	5–1	5–1	2023–24 UEFA Women's Nations League
75	28 February 2024	Marbella, Spain	Austria	1–1	1–1	Friendly
76	12 July 2024	Sint-Truiden, Belgium	Belgium	2–0	3–0	UEFA Women's Euro 2025 qualifying
77	21 February 2025	Odense, Denmark	Sweden	1–1	1–2	2025 UEFA Women's Nations League
78	30 May 2025	Odense, Denmark	Wales	1–0	1–0	2025 UEFA Women's Nations League
79	24 October 2025	Tampere, Finland	Finland	3–0	6–1	2025 UEFA Women's Nations League play-off matches
80	24 October 2025	Tampere, Finland	Finland	4–0	6–1	2025 UEFA Women's Nations League play-off matches
81	28 October 2025	Copenhagen, Denmark	Finland	2–0	2–0	2025 UEFA Women's Nations League play-off matches
82	3 March 2026	Horsens, Denmark	Serbia	3–1	3–1	2027 FIFA Women's World Cup qualification
83	14 April 2026	Gothenburg, Sweden	Sweden	1–1	2–1	2027 FIFA Women's World Cup qualification
84	5 June 2026	Odense, Denmark	Sweden	2–1	2–1	2027 FIFA Women's World Cup qualification
85	9 June 2026	Stara Pazova, Serbia	Serbia	3–1	4–1	2027 FIFA Women's World Cup qualification
86	9 October 2026	Montreal, Canada	Canada	1–0	1–1	Friendly
87	12 October 2026	Toronto, Canada	Canada	2–1	4–3	Friendly

== Honours ==
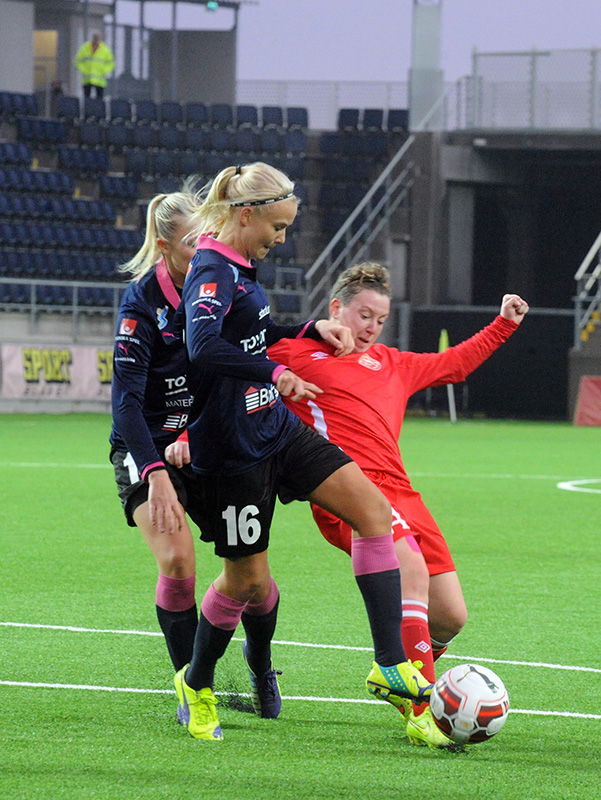
Harder (#16) playing for Linköping in the UEFA Women's Champions League, 2014

Linköping

- Damallsvenskan: 2016
- Svenska Cupen: 2014, 2015; runner-up: 2016
- Svenska Supercupen runner up: 2015, 2016

VfL Wolfsburg

- Bundesliga: 2016–17, 2017–18, 2018–19, 2019–20
- DFB-Pokal: 2016–17, 2017–18, 2018–19, 2019–20
- UEFA Women's Champions League runner-up: 2017–18, 2019–20

Chelsea

- FA Women's Super League: 2020–21, 2021–22, 2022–23
- Women's FA Cup: 2020–21, 2021–22, 2022–23
- FA Women's League Cup: 2020–21
- UEFA Women's Champions League runner-up: 2020–21

Bayern Munich

- Bundesliga: 2023–24, 2024–25, 2025–26
- DFB-Supercup Frauen: 2024, 2025, 2026
- DFB-Pokal: 2024–25, 2025–26
- World Sevens Football Tournament: 2025

Denmark

- UEFA Women's Euro runner-up: 2017

Individual

- Danish Breakthrough Player of the Year: 2010
- Danish Football Player of the Year: 2012, 2015, 2016, 2017, 2018, 2019, 2020, 2024, 2025
- Damallsvenskan's Most Valuable Player: 2015, 2016
- Damallsvenskan Forward of the Year: 2015, 2016
- Damallsvenskan Top scorer: 2016
- FIFPro: FIFA FIFPro World XI: 2017, 2020
- UEFA Women's European Championship All Star Team: 2017
- Goal 50: 2017
- UEFA Women's Champions League Squad of the Season: 2016–17, 2017–18, 2018–19, 2019–20, 2020–21, 2025–26
- IFFHS Women's World Team: 2017, 2018, 2020
- Frauen-Bundesliga Top scorer: 2017–18, 2019–20
- UEFA Women's Player of the Year Award: 2017–18, 2019–20
- UEFA Women's Champions League Top scorer: 2018–19
- UEFA Champions League Forward of the Season: 2019–20
- The 100 Best Female Footballers in the World Winner: 2018, 2020
- Niedersachsens Fußballer des Jahres: 2020
- Women's Footballer of the Year (Germany): 2020
- World Soccer's Women's World Player of the Year: 2020
- IFFHS World's Best Woman Player: 2020
- IFFHS UEFA Woman Team of the Decade 2011–2020
- FA Women's Super League Goal of the Month: September 2021
- Bayern Munich Women's Player of the Season: 2024–2025, 2025-2026

== See also ==
- List of women's footballers with 100 or more international caps
