= Maja Sternad =

Slovenian footballer (born 2003)

Personal information
- Date of birth: 28 December 2003 (age 22)
- Place of birth: Bornholte, Germany
- Height: 1.70 m (5 ft 7 in)
- Position: Winger

Team information
- Current team: Bayer 04 Leverkusen
- Number: 23

Youth career
- 2016–2019: SC Verl
- 2019–2020: Arminia Bielefeld

Senior career*
| Years | Team | Apps | (Gls) |
| 2020–2021 | Arminia Bielefeld | 16 | (3) |
| 2021–2026 | Werder Bremen | 98 | (8) |
| 2026– | Bayer 04 Leverkusen | 11 | (3) |

International career^{‡}
| 2017–2018 | Germany U19 | 5 | (2) |
| 2021–2022 | Germany U19 | 4 | (2) |
| 2022 | Germany U20 | 2 | (0) |
| 2024– | Slovenia | 18 | (2) |
- * Club domestic league appearances and goals as of 20 November 2026 ‡ National team caps and goals as of 9 June 2026

Maja Sternad (born 28 April 2003) is a professional footballer who plays as a winger for Bayer 04 Leverkusen. Born in Germany, she plays for the Slovenia women's national team.

== Club career ==
Sternad began playing football with the boy's youth side of SC Verl, before moving to Arminia Bielefeld on 26 November 2019. On 16 June 2021, she transferred to the Frauen-Bundesliga club Werder Bremen. For the 2026/27 season, she moved to a league rival Bayer 04 Leverkusen.

== International career ==
Born in Germany, Sternad is of Slovene descent through her father from Maribor and holds dual-citizenship. She played for the Germany U20s at the 2022 FIFA U-20 Women's World Cup. On 16 October 2024, it was announced that she opted to play for the Slovenia women's national team at a senior level.
