= José Barcala =

Spanish football manager

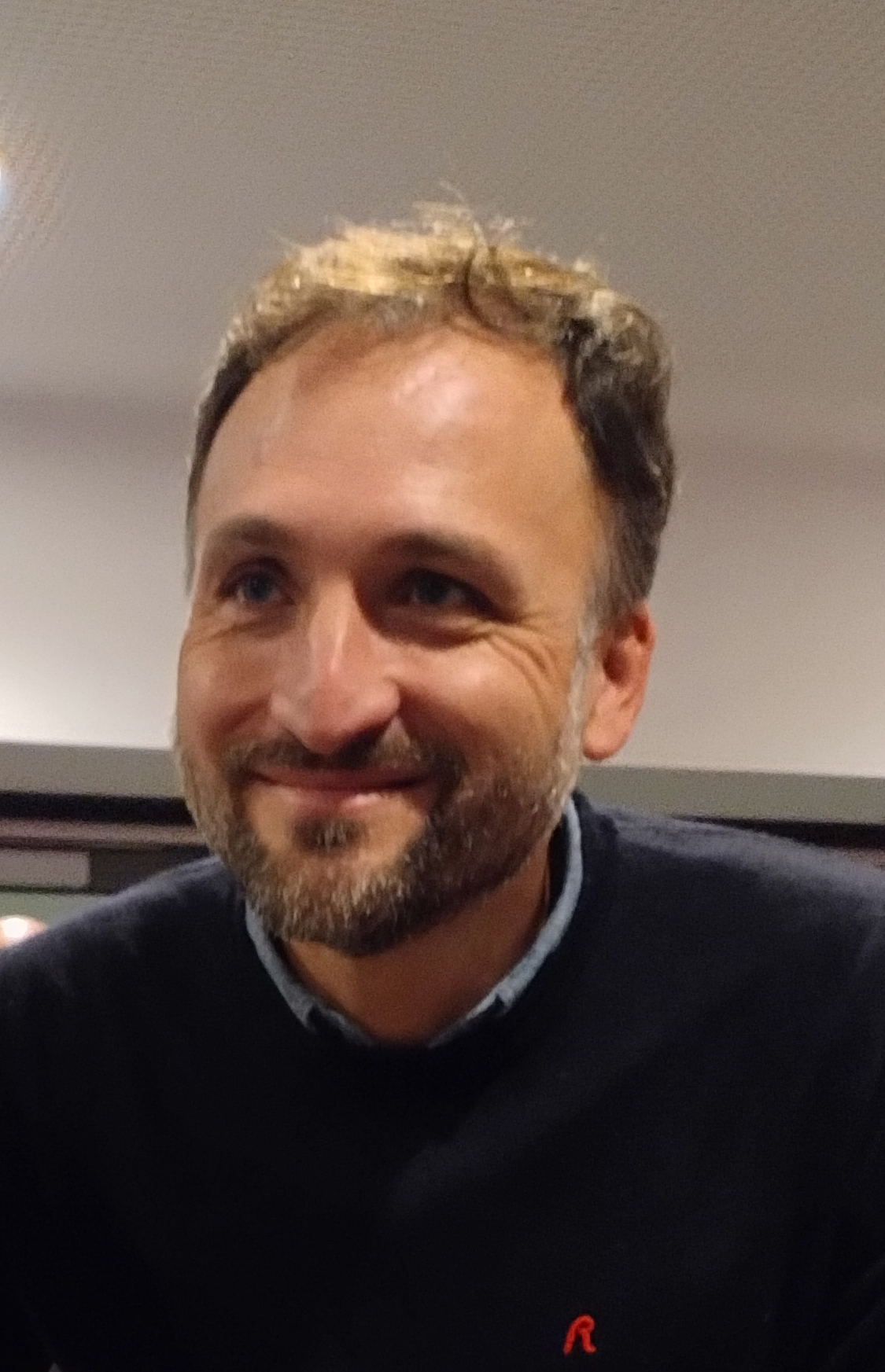
- Barcala in 2025

Personal information
- Full name: José Antonio Barcala García
- Date of birth: 28 September 1981 (age 45)
- Place of birth: Meaño, Spain

Team information
- Current team: Bayern Munich (women) (manager)

Managerial career
- Years: Team
- 2013–2014: University of Queensland
- 2014–2017: Deportivo La Coruña (youth)
- 2017–2019: Brisbane Roar (youth)
- 2023–2025: Servette (women)
- 2025–: Bayern Munich (women)

José Antonio Barcala García (born 28 September 1981) is a Spanish professional football manager who manages Frauen-Bundesliga club Bayern Munich.

== Career ==
In 2017, Barcala was appointed as a youth manager of Australian side Brisbane Roar. Two years later, he joined French women's side Girondins de Bordeaux as an assistant. Following his stint there, he was hired as an assistant manager of Swiss side Aarau in 2021.

The same year, Barcala was appointed assistant manager of the Scotland women's national team. During the summer of 2023, he took charge of Swiss women's side Servette, helping the club win the league title. Ahead of the 2025–26 season, he was appointed manager of German side Bayern Munich.

== Personal life ==
Barcala was born on 28 September 1981. Born in Meaño, Spain, he is a native of the city. Married, he has two daughters.

== Honours ==
Servette

- Swiss Women's Super League: 2023–24

Bayern Munich

- Frauen-Bundesliga: 2025–26
