= 2022–23 DFB-Pokal Frauen =

Tournament details
- Country: Germany
- Venue(s): RheinEnergieStadion, Cologne
- Dates: 20 August 2022 – 18 May 2023
- Teams: 48

Final positions
- Champions: VfL Wolfsburg (10th title)
- Runner-up: SC Freiburg

Tournament statistics
- Matches played: 47
- Goals scored: 225 (4.79 per match)
- Attendance: 98,969 (2,106 per match)
- Top goal scorer(s): Alexandra Popp (5 goals)
- Goals scored in penalty shoot-outs not included.

The 2022–23 DFB-Pokal was the 42nd season of the annual German football cup competition. Forty-eight teams participated in the competition, including all teams from the previous year's Frauen-Bundesliga and the 2. Frauen-Bundesliga, excluding second teams. The competition began on 21 August 2021 with the first of six rounds and ended on 18 May 2022 with the final at the RheinEnergieStadion in Cologne, a nominally neutral venue, which has hosted the final since 2010.

VfL Wolfsburg were the eight-time defending champions and defended their title with a 4–1 win over SC Freiburg.

== Participating clubs ==
The following clubs qualified for the competition:

Bundesliga the twelve clubs of the 2021–22 season	2. Bundesliga; ten of the 14 clubs of the 2021–22 season (Note: The second teams of Eintracht Frankfurt, 1899 Hoffenheim, Bayern Munich and VfL Wolfsburg were not eligible.)	Regionalliga the five champions of the 2021–22 season (Note: The second teams of Turbine Potsdam, 1. FC Köln and SC Freiburg were not eligible and were replaced by the respective second-placed team.)
Werder Bremen; SGS Essen; Eintracht Frankfurt; SC Freiburg; 1899 Hoffenheim; Carl Zeiss Jena; 1. FC Köln; Bayer Leverkusen; Bayern Munich; Turbine Potsdam; SC Sand; VfL Wolfsburg	SG Andernach; Borussia Bocholt; MSV Duisburg; SV Elversberg; FSV Gütersloh; SV Henstedt-Ulzburg; FC Ingolstadt; RB Leipzig; SV Meppen; 1. FC Nürnberg	Türkiyemspor Berlin; VfL Bochum; Hamburger SV; 1. FC Saarbrücken; SV Weinberg
Verbandspokal the 21 winners of the regional association cups
Baden: Karlsruher SC; Bavaria: FFC Wacker München; Berlin: Viktoria Berlin (Note: Viktoria Berlin qualified regardless of the outcome of the Berlin Cup final, as Türkiyemspor Berlin, the other finalists, already qualified via the Regionalliga.); Brandenburg: BSG Stahl Brandenburg; Bremen: ATS Buntentor; Hamburg: Eimsbütteler TV (Note: Eimsbütteler TV qualified regardless of the outcome of the Hamburg Cup final, as Hamburger SV, the other finalists, already qualified via the Regionalliga.); Hesse: Jahn Calden (Note: Jahn Calden qualified regardless of the outcome of the Saxony Cup final, as Eintracht Frankfurt III, the other finalists, were ineligible.)	Lower Rhine: VfR Warbeyen; Lower Saxony: VfL Jesteburg; Mecklenburg-Vorpommern: Rostocker FC; Middle Rhine: Fortuna Köln; Rhineland: SC 13 Bad Neuenahr; Saarland: 1. FC Riegelsberg (Note: 1. FC Riegelsberg qualified regardless of the outcome of the Saarland Cup final, as 1. FC Saarbrücken, the other finalists, already qualified via the Regionalliga.); Saxony: Chemnitzer FC (Note: Chemnitzer FC qualified regardless of the outcome of the Saxony Cup final, as RB Leipzig II, the other finalists, were ineligible.)	Saxony-Anhalt: Magdeburger FFC; Schleswig-Holstein: Holstein Kiel; South Baden: Alemannia Zähringen; Southwest: 1. FFC 08 Niederkirchen; Thuringia: Saalfeld Titans (Note: Saalfeld Titans qualified regardless of the outcome of the Saxony Cup final, as Carl Zeiss Jena II, the other finalists, were ineligible.); Westphalia: SpVg Berghofen; Württemberg: SV Hegnach

== Format ==
Clubs from lower leagues hosted against clubs from higher leagues until the quarter-finals. Should both clubs play below the 2. Bundesliga, there was no host club change anymore.

== Schedule ==
The rounds of the 2022–23 competition were scheduled as follows:

Round	Matches
First round	20–22 August 2022
Second round	10–12 September 2022
Round of 16	19–20 November 2022
Quarter-finals	28 February – 1 March 2023
Semi-finals	15–16 April 2023
Final	18 May 2023 at RheinEnergieStadion, Cologne

Times up to 29 October 2022 and from 26 March 2023 are CEST (UTC+2). Times from 30 October 2022 to 25 March 2023 are CET (UTC+1).

== First round ==
The draw was made on 1 July 2022, with Sabine Mammitzsch drawing the matches. The teams were split in a North and South group. The matches took place between 20 and 22 August 2022. All clubs from the 2021–22 Frauen-Bundesliga and the four best-placed teams from the 2021–22 2. Frauen-Bundesliga received a bye.

20 August 2022	ATS Buntentor	3–3 (a.e.t.) (2–0 p)	Hamburger SV	Bremen
13:00	Gieseke 1', 14'; Böttjer 59'	Report	Schulz 3' (pen.); Karowski 39'; Baum 57'	Stadium: BSA Kuhhirten; Attendance: 380; Referee: Lara Wolf
	Penalties
	Gieseke (penalty scored); Welkenbach (penalty scored)		Penalty missed

20 August 2022	Saalfeld Titans	1–11	Karlsruher SC	Saalfeld
15:00	Preller 47'	Report	Häfele 5'; Zweigner-Genzer 31' (pen.), 38', 40', 62'; Kreutzer 42', 63', 82'; Nagel 70', 80'; Kirtzakis 75'	Stadium: Stadion an den Saalewiesen; Attendance: 600; Referee: Marie Mühlbauer

21 August 2022	Rostocker FC 1895	0–9	FSV Gütersloh	Rostock
11:00		Report	Wahle 10'; Aradini 37'; Kreil 58', 77', 86'; Strothmann 59'; Baum 67', 90'; Leubner 80'	Stadium: Sportplatz Damerower Weg; Attendance: 95; Referee: Celina-Sophie Böhm

21 August 2022	SV 67 Weinberg	4–1	SC 07 Bad Neuenahr	Weinberg
11:00	Hofrichter 40', 49'; M. Haberäcker 78'; L. Haberäcker 90+1'	Report	Bartoschek 14'	Stadium: Sportplatz Weinberg; Attendance: 100; Referee: Davina Lutz

21 August 2022	Fortuna Köln	4–0	Chemnitzer FC	Cologne
11:00	Schwing 37'; Adames 44'; Gauger 49'; Linden 89'	Report		Stadium: BZA Chorweiler; Attendance: 104; Referee: Nadine Westerhoff

21 August 2022	1. FC Riegelsberg	0–3	1. FC Nürnberg	Riegelsberg
11:00		Report	Lein 5'; Mühlemann 10'; Hein 80'	Stadium: Stadion am Wäldchen; Attendance: 200; Referee: Daniela Kottmann

21 August 2022	TSV Jahn Calden	2–0	TSV Alemannia Freiburg-Zähringen	Calden
13:00	Hildebrandt 26', 78'	Report		Stadium: Stadion Kaiserplatz; Attendance: 150; Referee: Annika Kost

21 August 2022	Magdeburger FFC	3–1	SV Berghofen	Magdeburg
13:00	Krüger 8'; Alsleben 15'; Träbert 85'	Report	Dubbel 81' (pen.)	Stadium: Sportanlage des VfB Ottersleben; Attendance: 170; Referee: Irina Stremel

21 August 2022	Türkiyemspor Berlin	6–1	Eimsbütteler TV	Berlin
14:00	Aydin 7', 46'; Lübcke 54'; Szuh 62', 65'; El-Agha 76'	Report	Paulini 13'	Stadium: Willi-Kressmann-Stadion; Attendance: 310; Referee: Miriam Schwermer

21 August 2022	VfL Jesteburg	3–4 (a.e.t.)	SV Henstedt-Ulzburg	Jesteburg
14:00	Vetter 20'; Günthel 32'; Rocha Ferreira 107'	Report	Hahn 15'; Michel 72', 105'; Nagorny 115'	Stadium: Stadion Am Alten Moor; Attendance: 300; Referee: Lara Wolf

21 August 2022	BSG Stahl Brandenburg	0–7	Viktoria Berlin	Brandenburg an der Havel
14:00		Report	Gerken 9'; Sänger 20'; Statz 23'; Trapp 26'; Yaren 33', 81'; Sarr 90'	Stadium: Stadion am Quenz; Attendance: 518; Referee: Christine Weigelt

21 August 2022	SV Elversberg	3–0	1. FFC 08 Niederkirchen	Quierschied
14:00	Würtele 31'; Jung 36'; Akcay 45'	Report		Stadium: Quierschied Rasenplatz; Attendance: 125; Referee: Sonja Reßler

21 August 2022	1. FC Saarbrücken	3–2	SV Hegnach 1947	Saarbrücken
14:00	Yatsugi 12'; Stöhr 19'; Kintzig 39'	Report	Rilling 8'; Arcangioli 65' (pen.)	Stadium: Stadion Kieselhumes; Attendance: 249; Referee: Selina Menzel

21 August 2022	VfR Warbeyen	1–2	Borussia Bocholt	Kleve
15:00	Opladen 90+1'	Report	Büning 2'; Angerer 50'	Stadium: Eroglu-Arena; Attendance: 1,100; Referee: Anke Hölscher

21 August 2022	FFC Wacker Munich	0–0 (a.e.t.) (4–5 p)	FC Ingolstadt	Munich
15:00		Report		Stadium: Bezirkssportanlage Untersendling; Attendance: 315; Referee: Silke Fritz
	Penalties
	Kolb (penalty scored); Hilmer (penalty scored); Lieber (penalty scored); Leisching (penalty scored)		(penalty scored) Mailbeck; (penalty scored) Fritz; (penalty scored) Ebert; (penalty scored) Vidović; (penalty scored) Wolfram

22 August 2022	Holstein Kiel	1–2	VfL Bochum	Kiel
18:00	Thien 89'	Report	Franke 20'; Angrick 47'	Stadium: Holstein-Stadion; Attendance: 2,000; Referee: Anna-Lena Heidenreich

== Second round ==
The draw was held on 22 August 2022 with Turid Knaak drawing the matches. The teams were split in a North and South group. All clubs from the 2021–22 Frauen-Bundesliga and the four best-placed teams from the 2021–22 2. Frauen-Bundesliga joined in this round. The matches took place from 10 to 12 September 2022.

10 September 2022	Fortuna Köln	0–1	SC Sand	Cologne
18:00		Report	McGovern 81'	Stadium: Südstadion; Attendance: 350; Referee: Sina Diekmann

11 September 2022	ATS Buntentor	1–6	SGS Essen	Bremen
13:00	Böttjer 20'	Report	Endemann 14', 60'; Pfluger 38', 48'; Berentzen 47', 64'	Stadium: BSA Kuhhirten; Attendance: 374; Referee: Celina-Sophie Böhm

11 September 2022	Magdeburger FFC	0–5	MSV Duisburg	Magdeburg
13:00		Report	Hoppius 2', 33', 55'; Leonhart 85'; Fürst 88' (pen.)	Stadium: Heinrich Germer Stadium; Attendance: 137; Referee: Adrian Hintze

11 September 2022	Borussia Bocholt	1–2	Carl Zeiss Jena	Bocholt
13:00	Angerer 72'	Report	Landmann 16'; Kremlitschka 62'	Stadium: Sonilift-Arena; Referee: Anke Hölscher

11 September 2022	SV 67 Weinberg	0–7	Eintracht Frankfurt	Weinberg
13:00		Report	Nüsken 3', 63'; Prašnikar 18'; Freigang 38'; Martinez 50'; Reuteler 62'; Kirchberger 67'	Stadium: Sportplatz Weinberg; Attendance: 650; Referee: Angelika Söder

11 September 2022	SV Henstedt-Ulzburg	0–3	Werder Bremen	Henstedt-Ulzburg
14:00		Report	Meyer 32'; Ulbrich 71' (pen.); Hausicke 77'	Stadium: Beckersberg Stadion; Attendance: 327; Referee: Lara Wolf

11 September 2022	FSV Gütersloh	2–8	VfL Wolfsburg	Rheda-Wiedenbrück
14:00	Baumgärtel 2'; Leubner 50'	Report	Roord 32'; Janssen 34'; Popp 35', 53', 83', 85'; Wilms 87'; Pajor 90'	Stadium: Tönnies-Arena; Attendance: 2,047; Referee: Nadine Westerhoff

11 September 2022	VfL Bochum	0–1	SV Meppen	Bochum
14:00		Report	Maksuti 37'	Stadium: Leichtathletikplatz am Vonovia Ruhrstadion; Attendance: 1,418; Referee: Annika Kost

11 September 2022	Türkiyemspor Berlin	0–6	RB Leipzig	Berlin
14:00		Report	Fudalla 10'; Hipp 22', 49'; Brecht 44'; Schreiber 50'; Dešić 75'	Stadium: Willi-Kressmann-Stadion; Attendance: 153; Referee: Irina Stremel

11 September 2022	TSV Jahn Calden	1–4	Bayer Leverkusen	Calden
14:00	Rühmer 80'	Report	Turányi 14'; Kögel 27', 81', 88'	Stadium: Stadion Kaiserplatz; Attendance: 350; Referee: Katrin Rafalski

11 September 2022	SV Elversberg	0–8	1. FC Köln	Friedrichsthal
14:00		Report	Islacker 4', 9', 39'; Moorrees 50'; Beuschlein 58', 59'; Cordes 65'; Beck 68'	Stadium: Sportanlage Am Franzschacht; Attendance: 150; Referee: Fabienne Michel

11 September 2022	SG Andernach	2–3 (a.e.t.)	SC Freiburg	Andernach
14:00	Brückel 90+7'; Schumacher 120+1'	Report	Fölmli 88', 120'; Kayikçi 93'	Stadium: Stadion am Bassenheimer Weg; Attendance: 175; Referee: Sonja Reßler

11 September 2022	Karlsruher SC	1–2	1. FC Nürnberg	Bruchsal
14:00	Rogee 53'	Report	Lein 42'; Mühlemann 64'	Stadium: Städtisches Sportzentrum; Attendance: 250; Referee: Daniela Kottmann

11 September 2022	Viktoria Berlin	4–4 (a.e.t.) (2–3 p)	Turbine Potsdam	Berlin
16:00	Behrend 53'; Yaren 71'; Trapp 75', 94'	Report	Kyōkawa 9'; Weidauer 24', 111'; Barrett 86'	Stadium: Stadion Lichterfelde; Attendance: 1,200; Referee: Anna-Lena Heidenreich
	Penalties
	Trapp (penalty scored); Sange (penalty missed); Sänger (penalty scored); Riedel (penalty missed); Statz (penalty missed)		(penalty scored) Wiankowska; (penalty missed) Buchholz; (penalty scored) Weidauer; (penalty scored) Gentile

11 September 2022	1. FC Saarbrücken	1–7	1899 Hoffenheim	Saarbrücken
16:00	Clausen 78' (pen.)	Report	Memeti 12'; Hickelsberger 36', 47'; Kössler 42'; Hartig 58'; Corley 65'; Hagel 89'	Stadium: Stadion Kieselhumes; Attendance: 100; Referee: Karoline Wacker

12 September 2022	FC Ingolstadt	0–7	Bayern Munich	Ingolstadt
18:30		Report	Schüller 3'; Dallmann 8'; Kumagai 12'; Magull 24'; Simon 61'; Gwinn 65'; Bühl 77'	Stadium: Audi Sportpark; Attendance: 2,773; Referee: Melissa Joos

== Round of 16 ==
The draw was held on 18 September 2022 with Dietmar Hamann drawing the matches. The matches took place from 19 to 20 November 2022.

19 November 2022	RB Leipzig	2–1	Eintracht Frankfurt	Leipzig
12:00	Müller 53', 89'	Report	Freigang 16'	Stadium: RB-Trainingszentrum Cottaweg; Attendance: 1,300; Referee: Franziska Wildfeuer

19 November 2022	SGS Essen	1–0	Werder Bremen	Essen
13:00	Endemann 73' (pen.)	Report		Stadium: Stadion an der Hafenstraße; Attendance: 1,027; Referee: Katrin Rafalski

19 November 2022	Carl Zeiss Jena	4–2	SC Sand	Jena
13:00	Birkholz 19', 90+2'; Arnold 64', 67'	Report	König 17', 38' (pen.)	Stadium: Ernst-Abbe-Sportfeld; Attendance: 200; Referee: Christine Weigelt

19 November 2022	MSV Duisburg	0–7	Bayern Munich	Duisburg
14:30		Report	Simon 3', 77'; Dallmann 9', 90'; Magull 53'; Stanway 69'; Kumagai 83'	Stadium: MSV-Arena; Attendance: 2,662; Referee: Riem Hussein

20 November 2022	1899 Hoffenheim	3–0	Bayer Leverkusen	Sinsheim
13:00	Memeti 16', 78', 84'	Report		Stadium: Dietmar-Hopp-Stadion; Attendance: 704; Referee: Angelika Söder

20 November 2022	SC Freiburg	1–0	SV Meppen	Freiburg
13:00	Minge 9'	Report		Stadium: Dreisamstadion; Attendance: 1,625; Referee: Karoline Wacker

20 November 2022	Turbine Potsdam	1–2 (a.e.t.)	1. FC Köln	Potsdam
13:00	Selimhodzic 57'	Report	Bienz 86'; Moorrees 99'	Stadium: Karl-Liebknecht-Stadion; Attendance: 669; Referee: Miriam Schwermer

20 November 2022	1. FC Nürnberg	0–6	VfL Wolfsburg	Nuremberg
14:00		Report	Roord 32', 41'; Pajor 44'; Führlein 76' (o.g.); Jónsdóttir 80'; Bremer 90'	Stadium: Max-Morlock-Stadion; Attendance: 17,302; Referee: Sina Diekmann

== Quarter-finals ==
The draw was held on 20 November 2022 with Marie-Louise Eta drawing the matches. The matches took place on 28 February 2023.

28 February 2023	1. FC Köln	0–4	VfL Wolfsburg	Cologne
18:00		Report	Pajor 24'; Huth 42'; Hegering 66'; Brand 88'	Stadium: Franz-Kremer-Stadion; Attendance: 3,521; Referee: Mirka Derlin

28 February 2023	RB Leipzig	6–1	SGS Essen	Leipzig
18:00	Fudalla 9', 78'; Dešić 12'; Rackow 20'; Kaiser 36'; Mauly 86'	Report	Maier 52'	Stadium: RB-Trainingszentrum Cottaweg; Attendance: 1,300; Referee: Fabienne Michel

28 February 2023	Carl Zeiss Jena	0–4	SC Freiburg	Jena
18:00		Report	Steinert 13'; Landmann 24' (o.g.); Kolb 79'; Steuerwald 83'	Stadium: Ernst-Abbe-Sportfeld; Attendance: 1,036; Referee: Angelika Söder

28 February 2023	1899 Hoffenheim	0–2	Bayern Munich	Sinsheim
20:30		Report	Rall 68'; Bühl 77'	Stadium: Dietmar-Hopp-Stadion; Attendance: 1,695; Referee: Franziska Wildfeuer

== Semi-finals ==
The draw was held on 5 March 2023 with Mirko Slomka drawing the matches. The matches took place on 15 and 16 April 2023.

15 April 2023	Bayern Munich	0–5	VfL Wolfsburg	Munich
14:00		Report	Jónsdóttir 19', 47'; Pajor 44'; Brand 56'; Janssen 60' (pen.)	Stadium: FC Bayern Campus; Attendance: 2,500; Referee: Mirka Derlin

16 April 2023	RB Leipzig	0–1	SC Freiburg	Leipzig
18:30		Report	Kayikçi 90+7'	Stadium: RB-Trainingszentrum Cottaweg; Attendance: 1,800; Referee: Karoline Wacker

== Final ==
The final took place on 18 May 2023 at the RheinEnergieStadion in Cologne.

18 May 2023
16:45

VfL Wolfsburg	4–1	SC Freiburg
Karl 4' (o.g.); Blomqvist 58'; Popp 84'; Janssen 90' (pen.)	Report	Minge 42'

RheinEnergieStadion, Cologne
Attendance: 44,808
Referee: Fabienne Michel

VfL Wolfsburg	SC Freiburg

GK	1	(Germany) Merle Frohms
RB	2	(Netherlands) Lynn Wilms	(substituted off) 90+2'
CB	4	(Germany) Kathrin Hendrich
CB	6	(Netherlands) Dominique Janssen
LB	13	(Germany) Felicitas Rauch
CM	5	(Germany) Lena Oberdorf	(substituted off) 90+2'
CM	14	(Netherlands) Jill Roord	(substituted off) 80'
RW	10	(Germany) Svenja Huth
AM	21	(Sweden) Rebecka Blomqvist	(substituted off) 87'
LW	23	(Iceland) Sveindís Jane Jónsdóttir	(substituted off) 46'
CF	11	(Germany) Alexandra Popp (c)
Substitutes:
GK	30	(Germany) Lisa Weiß
DF	3	(Slovenia) Sara Agrež
DF	24	(Germany) Joelle Wedemeyer	(substituted in) 90+2'
MF	17	(Germany) Kristin Demann	(substituted in) 90+2'
MF	20	(Germany) Pia-Sophie Wolter
MF	29	(Germany) Jule Brand	(substituted in) 87'
FW	7	(Germany) Pauline Bremer
FW	9	(Poland) Ewa Pajor	(substituted in) 46'
FW	28	(Germany) Tabea Waßmuth	(substituted in) 80'
Manager:
(Germany) Tommy Stroot

GK	26	(Canada) Gabrielle Lambert
RB	2	(Germany) Lisa Karl
CB	21	(Germany) Samantha Steuerwald	(yellow card) 40'
CB	16	(France) Greta Stegemann
LB	23	(Germany) Marie Müller
CM	4	(Germany) Meret Felde	(yellow card) 89'	(substituted off) 90+2'
CM	9	(Germany) Janina Minge
RW	18	(Austria) Lisa Kolb		(substituted off) 55'
AM	11	(Germany) Hasret Kayikçi (c)
LW	13	(Germany) Judith Steinert		(substituted off) 74'
CF	27	(Germany) Giovanna Hoffmann		(substituted off) 74'
Substitutes:
GK		(Germany) Rebecca Adamczyk
DF	3	(Germany) Alina Axtmann
DF	5	(Germany) Kim Fellhauer		(substituted in) 90+2'
DF	20	(Slovakia) Jana Vojteková
DF	22	(Germany) Luisa Wensing
MF	7	(Germany) Chiara Bouziane		(substituted in) 74'
MF	19	(Austria) Annabel Schasching		(substituted in) 74'
MF	10	(Switzerland) Riola Xhemaili
FW	28	(Germany) Cora Zicai		(substituted in) 55'
Manager:
(Germany) Theresa Merk

Assistant referees:
Sina Diekmann
Melissa Joos
Fourth official:
Angelika Söder
Video assistant referee:
Katrin Rafalski
Assistant video assistant referee:
Vanessa Arlt

Match rules

- 90 minutes.
- 30 minutes of extra time if necessary.
- Penalty shoot-out if scores still level.
- Nine named substitutes.
- Maximum of five substitutions. (Note: Each team will be given only three opportunities to make substitutions, with a fourth opportunity in extra time, excluding substitutions made at half-time, before the start of extra time and at half-time in extra time.)

== Top goalscorers ==
The following players were the top scorers of the DFB-Pokal, sorted first by number of goals, and then alphabetically if necessary. Goals scored in penalty shoot-outs are not included.

Rank	Player	Team	Goals
1	(Germany) Alexandra Popp	VfL Wolfsburg	5
2	(Kosovo) Erëleta Memeti	1899 Hoffenheim	4
2	(Poland) Ewa Pajor	VfL Wolfsburg	4
2	(Germany) Melissa Zweigner-Genzer	Karlsruher SC	4
5	14 players		3
