= 2021–22 DFB-Pokal Frauen =

Tournament details
- Country: Germany
- Venue(s): RheinEnergieStadion, Cologne
- Dates: 21 August 2021 – 28 May 2022
- Teams: 54

Final positions
- Champions: VfL Wolfsburg (9th title)
- Runners-up: Turbine Potsdam

Tournament statistics
- Matches played: 53
- Goals scored: 256 (4.83 per match)
- Attendance: 40,345 (761 per match)
- Top goal scorer(s): four players (6 goals)
- Goals scored in penalty shoot-outs not included.

The 2021–22 DFB-Pokal was the 42nd season of the annual German football cup competition. Several teams participated in the competition, including all teams from the previous year's Frauen-Bundesliga and the 2. Frauen-Bundesliga, excluding second teams. The competition began on 21 August 2021 with the first of six rounds and ended on 28 May 2022 with the final at the RheinEnergieStadion in Cologne, a nominally neutral venue, which has hosted the final since 2010.

VfL Wolfsburg were the seven-time defending champion and defended their title by defeating Turbine Potsdam in the final.

== Participating clubs ==
The following clubs qualified for the competition:

Bundesliga the 12 clubs of the 2020–21 season	2. Bundesliga; 13 of the 18 clubs of the 2020–21 season (Note: The second teams of Eintracht Frankfurt, 1899 Hoffenheim, Bayern Munich, Turbine Potsdam and VfL Wolfsburg were not eligible.)	Regionalliga; 8 champions and runners-up of the 2020–21 season (Note: The second team of 1. FC Köln was not eligible.)
Werder Bremen; MSV Duisburg; SGS Essen; Eintracht Frankfurt; SC Freiburg; 1899 Hoffenheim; Bayer Leverkusen; SV Meppen; Bayern Munich; Turbine Potsdam; SC Sand; VfL Wolfsburg	SG Andernach; SpVg Berghofen; Arminia Bielefeld; Borussia Bocholt; FSV Gütersloh; FC Ingolstadt; Carl Zeiss Jena; 1. FC Köln; RB Leipzig; Borussia Mönchengladbach; 1. FFC 08 Niederkirchen; 1. FC Saarbrücken; Würzburger Kickers	SV Henstedt-Ulzburg; Hannover 96; Viktoria Berlin; Sportfreunde Siegen; SV Elversberg (as SV Göttelborn); Wormatia Worms; 1. FC Nürnberg; Jahn Calden
Verbandspokal the 21 winners of the regional association cups
Baden: Karlsruher SC (Note: Participant was chosen as the highest-ranking remaining club in the Verbandspokal.); Bavaria: Germania Ebing (Note: Participant was decided by draw.); Berlin: Hertha Zehlendorf; Brandenburg: FSV Babelsberg; Bremen: ATS Buntentor; Hamburg: Hamburger SV; Hesse: TSG Lütter	Lower Rhine: HSV Langenfeld; Lower Saxony: Pfeil Broistedt; Mecklenburg-Vorpommern: Rostocker FC; Middle Rhine: Viktoria Waldenrath-Straeten; Rhineland: TuS Immendorf; Saarland: 1. FC Riegelsberg; Saxony: Phoenix Leipzig	Saxony-Anhalt: Magdeburger FFC; Schleswig-Holstein: Holstein Kiel (Note: Holstein Kiel qualified regardless of the outcome of the Schleswig-Holstein Cup final, as SV Henstedt-Ulzburg, the other finalists, already qualified through their Regionalliga position.); South Baden: Hegauer FV; Southwest: SV Ober-Olm; Thuringia: Lok Meiningen (Note: Lok Meiningen qualified regardless of the outcome of the Thuringia Cup final, as Carl Zeiss Jena II, the other finalists, were ineligible.); Westphalia: SpVgg Horsthausen; Württemberg: FV 09 Nürtingen

== Format ==
Clubs from lower leagues hosted against clubs from higher leagues until the quarter-finals. Should both clubs play below the 2. Bundesliga, there were no host club change anymore.

== Schedule ==
The rounds of the 2021–22 competition were scheduled as follows:

Round	Matches
First round	21–22 August 2021
Second round	25–26 September 2021
Round of 16	30–31 October 2021
Quarter-finals	1–2 March 2022
Semi-finals	17–18 April 2022
Final	28 May 2022 at RheinEnergieStadion, Cologne

== First round ==
The draw was made on 13 July 2021, with Doris Fitschen drawing the matches. The teams were split in a North and South group. The matches took place on 21 and 22 August 2021. The ten best-placed clubs from the 2020–21 Frauen-Bundesliga received a bye.

21 August 2021	Rostocker FC	1–0	HSV Langenfeld	Rostock
14:00	Schulz 66'	Report		Stadium: Sportplatz Damerower Weg; Attendance: 150; Referee: Mirka Derlin

21 August 2021	Holstein Kiel	0–7	Hamburger SV	Kiel
14:00		Report	Nachtigall 17'; Hirche 27'; Van Bonn 44'; Stöckmann 57'; Mühlhaus 68', 71'; Henke 77'	Stadium: Stadion Waldwiese; Attendance: 120; Referee: Franziska Wildfeuer

21 August 2021	SV Berghofen	0–2	FSV Gütersloh	Dortmund
14:00		Report	Wolf 6'; Rieke 33'	Stadium: Sportplatz Berghofen; Attendance: 0 Referee: Sina Diekmann

21 August 2021	1. FC Saarbrücken	2–2 (a.e.t.) (3–5 p)	1. FC Nürnberg	Saarbrücken
14:00	Mayer 58'; Stöhr 87'	Report	Kusch 8'; Richert 90+1'	Stadium: Stadion Kieselhumes; Attendance: 120; Referee: Naemi Breier
	Penalties
	Steimer (penalty scored); Anstatt (penalty scored); Stöhr (penalty scored)		(penalty scored) Bogenschütz; (penalty scored) Urbanek; (penalty scored) Richert; (penalty scored) May; (penalty scored) Bauereisen

21 August 2021	TSG Lütter	0–7	1. FC Köln	Eichenzell
14:00		Report	Nietgen 10'; Beck 31'; Beckmann 39'; Gudorf 50'; Islacker 81', 90+2'; Barrett 83'	Stadium: Stadion Am Sauerbrunnen; Attendance: 700; Referee: Davina Haupt

21 August 2021	SV Ober-Olm	1–4	Hegauer FV	Nieder-Olm
15:00	Zimmek 47'	Report	Hahn 40'; Radice 55', 68'; Ramizi 71'	Stadium: Stadion am Engelborn; Attendance: 386; Referee: Fabienne Michel

21 August 2021	SpVgg Herne-Horsthausen	0–13	SV Henstedt-Ulzburg	Herne
16:00		Report	Ehlers 10', 54'; Hafkemeyer 24' (o.g.); Hahn 40', 43', 63', 67'; Schulz 47'; Nagorny 49'; Homp 69'; Marquardt 72', 90'; Lux 78'	Stadium: Fussballzentrum Horsthausen; Referee: Sarah Willms

21 August 2021	Sportfreunde Siegen	17–0	TuS Immendorf	Siegen
16:00	L. Fernholz 2', 75', 86', 30+1'; Lewer 10' (o.g.); P. Fernholz 23', 26', 34', 73', 77', 89'; Rüthing 44', 45+2'; Vogt 50'; Berchner 69'; Kampczyk 74', 87'	Report		Stadium: Leimbachstadion; Referee: Laura Duske

22 August 2021	ATS Buntentor	0–10	RB Leipzig	Bremen
11:00		Report	Müller 8', 22', 42'; Lange 35', 40', 48', 56'; Reißmann 76'; Ringsing 79'; Hipp 88'	Stadium: BSA Kuhhirten; Attendance: 100; Referee: Anke Hölscher

22 August 2021	Phoenix Leipzig	0–4	MSV Duisburg	Leipzig
11:00		Report	Ray 4'; Brandt 10'; Uveges 45', 88'	Stadium: Fortuna Sportpark; Attendance: 212; Referee: Nora Dieckmann

22 August 2021	FC Ingolstadt	0–2	SG 99 Andernach	Ingolstadt
11:00		Report	Hornberg 36', 62'	Stadium: Bezirkssportanlage Mitte; Attendance: 85; Referee: Marina Bachmann

22 August 2021	Magdeburger FFC	0–3	SV Meppen	Magdeburg
12:00		Report	Weiss 50'; Becker 90+2'; Josten 90+5'	Stadium: Heinrich Germer Stadium; Attendance: 66; Referee: Leroy Schott

22 August 2021	Germania Ebing	3–2	Viktoria Waldenrath-Straeten	Rattelsdorf
13:00	Frembs 4'; Schneiderbanger 16'; Sommer 76' (pen.)	Report	Senft 40', 57'	Stadium: Sportanlage Ebing; Attendance: 465; Referee: Davina Haupt

22 August 2021	Jahn Calden	0–2	Carl Zeiss Jena	Calden
14:00		Report	Woldmann 44'; Mori 73'	Stadium: Stadion Kaiserplatz; Attendance: 50; Referee: Julia Boike

22 August 2021	Arminia Bielefeld	1–1 (a.e.t.) (3–2 p)	Viktoria Berlin	Bielefeld
14:00	Lösch 42'	Report	Künzel 56'	Stadium: EDIMedien Arena; Attendance: 141; Referee: Annika Paszehr
	Penalties
	Schneider (penalty scored); Heitlindemann (penalty scored); Lösch (penalty scored)		(penalty scored) Lux; (penalty scored) Agac

22 August 2021	FSV Babelsberg	5–2	Pfeil Broistedt	Potsdam
14:00	Reinkober 18'; Wesely 20'; Von Zadow 23'; Simon 83', 88'	Report	Förster 24'; Zimmermann 80'	Stadium: Sportanlage in der Rudolf-Breitscheid-Straße; Attendance: 285; Referee: Julius Weiser

22 August 2021	1. FC Riegelsberg	0–5	SV Elversberg	Riegelsberg
14:00		Report	Reiter 1'; Berwind 47'; Selensky 50'; Wagner 64'; Blumenthal 75'	Stadium: Stadion am Wäldchen; Attendance: 450; Referee: Fabienne Michel

22 August 2021	Hannover 96	4–0	Hertha Zehlendorf	Hanover
15:00	Dose 5', 25', 87'; Füllkrug 18'	Report		Stadium: NLZ-Hannover 96; Attendance: 150; Referee: Levke Scholz

22 August 2021	Würzburger Kickers	2–0 (a.e.t.)	FV 09 Nürtingen	Würzburg
15:00	Gerst 114', 119'	Report		Stadium: Sportpark Heuchelhof; Attendance: 190; Referee: Patrick Mattern

22 August 2021	Karlsruher SC	3–0	1. FFC Niederkirchen	Bruchsal
16:00	Rogee 42', 82'; Müller 75'	Report		Stadium: Städtisches Sportzentrum; Attendance: 100; Referee: Melissa Joos

23 August 2021	Borussia Mönchengladbach	0–4	Borussia Bocholt	Mönchengladbach
18:30		Report	Corres 38' (o.g.); Pfeiffer 56'; Fischer 71'; Grünheid 77'	Stadium: Grenzlandstadion; Attendance: 131; Referee: Nadine Westerhoff

29 August 2021	Lok Meiningen	1–6	Wormatia Worms	Meiningen
14:00	Dömming 86'	Report	Magin 4'; Lovecchio 12', 64', 75'; Zelt 13'; Ruh 31'	Stadium: Stadion Maßfelder Weg; Attendance: 210; Referee: Kenny Abieba
Note: The match on 22 August at 15:00, was abandoned after the first half was completed (3–1 Wormatia Worms), due to bad weather.

== Second round ==
The draw was made on 30 August 2021, with Friederike Kromp drawing the matches. The matches took place from 25 to 27 September 2021.

25 September 2021	Hamburger SV	1–1 (a.e.t.) (3–2 p)	FSV Gütersloh	Hamburg
14:00	Hirche 11'	Report	Rieke 33'	Stadium: Wolfgang-Meyer Sportanlage; Attendance: 300; Referee: Celina-Sophie Böhm
	Penalties
	Hepfer (penalty scored); Dreyer (penalty scored); Mühlhaus (penalty missed); Stöckmann (penalty scored); Nachtigall (penalty missed)		(penalty missed) Rieke; (penalty scored) Tellenbröker; (penalty scored) Lückel; (penalty missed) Günnewig; (penalty missed) Baum

25 September 2021	Germania Ebing	0–10	SC Freiburg	Rattelsdorf
14:00		Report	Fölmli 4'; Minge 15'; Xhemaili 30' (pen.); Kayikçi 49', 58', 59', 67'; Müller 62', 89'; Vojteková 84'	Stadium: Seestadion; Attendance: 1,000; Referee: Angelika Söder

25 September 2021	Borussia Bocholt	0–1	Werder Bremen	Bocholt
15:00		Report	Sehan 88'	Stadium: Schröer-Consulting-Arena; Attendance: 425; Referee: Vanessa Arlt

25 September 2021	Hannover 96	1–5	Turbine Potsdam	Hanover
15:00	Rathmann 65'	Report	Cerci 6', 35', 53'; Weidauer 36'; Ehegötz 73'	Stadium: Beekestadion; Attendance: 237; Referee: Anna-Lena Heidenreich

25 September 2021	SG 99 Andernach	0–1	SC Sand	Andernach
15:00		Report	Evels 45+3'	Stadium: Stadion Andernach; Attendance: 145; Referee: Sina Diekmann

25 September 2021	SV Elversberg	0–6	Bayern Munich	Spiesen-Elversberg
17:30		Report	Damnjanović 10', 38', 58'; Rall 12'; Wenninger 32'; Zadrazil 84'	Stadium: Ursapharm-Arena; Attendance: 1,668; Referee: Fabienne Michel

26 September 2021	Hegauer FV	0–2	Carl Zeiss Jena	Engen
11:00		Report	Walter 43'; Volkmer 85'	Stadium: Hegau-Stadion; Attendance: 226; Referee: Melissa Joos

26 September 2021	FSV Babelsberg	0–6	Sportfreunde Siegen	Potsdam
12:00		Report	Schöbel 4'; Vogt 23'; Fernholz 25', 35'; Dentler 75', 90'	Stadium: Sportanlage Rudolf-Breitscheid-Straße; Attendance: 137; Referee: Levke Scholz

26 September 2021	SV Meppen	0–1	SGS Essen	Meppen
14:00		Report	Senß 90+2'	Stadium: Hänsch-Arena; Attendance: 286; Referee: Annika Kost

26 September 2021	RB Leipzig	1–3	Bayer Leverkusen	Leipzig
14:00	Fudalla 45+2'	Report	Zeller 19'; Weilharter 47' (o.g.); Wieder 55'	Stadium: Stadion am Bad; Attendance: 225; Referee: Miriam Schwermer

26 September 2021	Arminia Bielefeld	0–6	1. FC Köln	Bielefeld
14:00		Report	Barrett 23' (pen.), 67'; Beckmann 48'; Müller-Prießen 51'; Kuznik 77', 86'	Stadium: EDImedienArena; Attendance: 150; Referee: Nadine Westerhoff

26 September 2021	Rostocker FC	0–7	SV Henstedt-Ulzburg	Rostock
14:00		Report	Michel 6'; Hilmer 45', 77'; Knobloch 45+2'; Homp 52', 63'; Nagorny 69'	Stadium: Sportplatz Damerower Weg; Attendance: 150; Referee: Jacqueline Herrmann

26 September 2021	Wormatia Worms	0–2	Karlsruher SC	Worms
14:00		Report	Zweigner-Genzer 19' (pen.); Grünbacher 90+3'	Stadium: Wormatia-Stadion; Attendance: 372; Referee: Naemi Breier

26 September 2021	Würzburger Kickers	0–5	1899 Hoffenheim	Würzburg
15:00		Report	Linder 13'; Naschenweng 22' (pen.); Fühner 36'; Dongus 80'; Kocsán 82'	Stadium: Sportpark Heuchelhof; Attendance: 190; Referee: Ines Appelmann

26 September 2021	1. FC Nürnberg	0–5	Eintracht Frankfurt	Nuremberg
15:00		Report	Freigang 16', 81'; Mauron 55'; Jóhannsdóttir 58'; Prašnikar 64'	Stadium: Sportpark Valznerweiher; Attendance: 311; Referee: Karoline Wacker

27 September 2021	MSV Duisburg	1–3	VfL Wolfsburg	Duisburg
18:30	Uveges 21'	Report	Huth 43', 85'; Oberdorf 44'	Stadium: MSV-Arena; Attendance: 315; Referee: Laura Duske

== Round of 16 ==
The draw was made on 3 October 2021, with Julia Simic drawing the matches. The matches took place from 30 to 1 November 2021.

30 October 2021	Karlsruher SC	1–3	Carl Zeiss Jena	Bruchsal
12:00	Grünbacher 72'	Report	Volkmer 70' (pen.); Halm 83' (o.g.); Woldmann 87'	Stadium: Städtisches Sportzentrum; Attendance: 320; Referee: Ines Appelmann

30 October 2021	Bayern Munich	4–2	Eintracht Frankfurt	Munich
13:30	Schüller 27'; Gwinn 38'; Bühl 55', 78'	Report	Nüsken 42'; Feiersinger 64'	Stadium: FC Bayern Campus; Referee: Franziska Wildfeuer

31 October 2021	Werder Bremen	0–1	SC Sand	Bremen
12:00		Report	Kreil 10'	Stadium: Weserstadion Platz 11; Attendance: 250; Referee: Riem Hussein

31 October 2021	Sportfreunde Siegen	0–9	SV Henstedt-Ulzburg	Siegen
12:00		Report	Ehlers 19'; Hahn 20', 55'; Hilmer 60'; Krüger 66'; Schulz 67', 78'; Kunrath 87', 89'	Stadium: Leimbachstadion; Attendance: 100; Referee: Naemi Breier

31 October 2021	Turbine Potsdam	2–0	1. FC Köln	Potsdam
13:00	Höbinger 53'; Cerci 88'	Report		Stadium: Karl-Liebknecht-Stadion; Attendance: 944; Referee: Mirka Derlin

31 October 2021	Bayer Leverkusen	2–2 (a.e.t.) (5–4 p)	1899 Hoffenheim	Leverkusen
15:00	Zeller 90', 116'	Report	De Caigny 65'; Steinert 112'	Stadium: Ulrich-Haberland-Stadion; Attendance: 225; Referee: Nadine Westerhoff
	Penalties
	Zeller (penalty scored); Pando (penalty missed); Nikolić (penalty scored); Siems (penalty missed); Arfaoui (penalty scored); Vinken (penalty scored); Wirtz (penalty scored)		(penalty scored) Billa; (penalty scored) Feldkamp; (penalty missed) De Caigny; (penalty scored) Harsch; (penalty missed) Bühler; (penalty scored) Wienroither; (penalty missed) Specht

31 October 2021	Hamburger SV	0–1	SGS Essen	Hamburg
15:00		Report	Berentzen 67'	Stadium: Wolfgang-Meyer Sportanlage; Attendance: 500; Referee: Anna-Lena Heidenreich

1 November 2021	SC Freiburg	0–3	VfL Wolfsburg	Freiburg
18:30		Report	Janssen 12' (pen.); Roord 45+3'; De Huth 77'	Stadium: Dreisamstadion; Attendance: 3,100; Referee: Angelika Söder

== Quarter-finals ==
The draw was made on 7 November 2021, with Verena Schweers drawing the matches. The four matches took place from 28 February to 2 March 2022.

28 February 2022	Carl Zeiss Jena	1–9	Bayern Munich	Jena
18:30	Glas 41' (o.g.)	Report	Kremlitschka 9' (o.g.); Damnjanović 25', 37'; Bühl 49'; Magull 43'; Kumagai 55'; Adam 77' (o.g.); Asseyi 83'; Rall 88'	Stadium: Ernst-Abbe-Sportfeld; Attendance: 480; Referee: Franziska Wildfeuer

1 March 2022	SGS Essen	1–2 (a.e.t.)	Bayer Leverkusen	Essen
19:00	Endemann 12'	Report	Zeller 21', 104'	Stadium: Stadion Essen; Attendance: 1,013; Referee: Nadine Westerhoff

2 March 2022	VfL Wolfsburg	7–0	SC Sand	Wolfsburg
18:00	Janssen 14' (pen.); Rauch 16'; Smits 64', 66'; Blomqvist 68', 85'; Wedemeyer 90'	Report		Stadium: AOK Stadium; Attendance: 438; Referee: Katrin Rafalski

2 March 2022	SV Henstedt-Ulzburg	0–7	Turbine Potsdam	Henstedt-Ulzburg
19:00		Report		Stadium: Stadion Beckersberg; Referee: Anna-Lena Heidenreich

== Semi-finals ==
The draw for the semi-finals was held on 6 March 2022, with Laura Nolte drawing the matches. The two matches took place from 17 to 18 April 2022.

17 April 2022	Bayern Munich	1–3	VfL Wolfsburg	Munich
12:30	Damnjanović 50' (pen.)	Report	Roord 19', 61'; Waßmuth 80'	Stadium: FC Bayern Campus; Attendance: 2,332; Referee: Fabienne Michel

18 April 2022	Bayer Leverkusen	1–1 (a.e.t.) (3–4 p)	Turbine Potsdam	Leverkusen
18:30	Blagojević 66' (pen.)	Report	Kerschowski 83' (pen.)	Stadium: Ulrich-Haberland-Stadion; Attendance: 2,000; Referee: Riem Hussein
	Penalties
	Kögel (penalty scored); Zeller (penalty scored); Nikolić (penalty missed); Siems (penalty missed); Blagojević (penalty scored)		(penalty missed) Kössler; (penalty scored) Kerschowski; (penalty scored) Holmgaard; (penalty scored) Weidauer; (penalty scored) Agrež

== Final ==
The final took place on 28 May 2022 at the RheinEnergieStadion in Cologne.

28 May 2022
16:45

VfL Wolfsburg	4–0	Turbine Potsdam
Pajor 11', 32'; Roord 42'; Janssen 69'	Report

RheinEnergieStadion, Cologne
Attendance: 17,531
Referee: Karoline Wacker

VfL Wolfsburg	Turbine Potsdam

GK	1	(Germany) Almuth Schult
RB	2	(Netherlands) Lynn Wilms	(yellow card) 28'	(substituted off) 59'
CB	4	(Germany) Kathrin Hendrich
CB	6	(Netherlands) Dominique Janssen	(yellow card) 83'
LB	13	(Germany) Felicitas Rauch
DM	5	(Germany) Lena Oberdorf	(yellow card) 49'	(substituted off) 83'
RW	10	(Germany) Svenja Huth (c)
CM	14	(Netherlands) Jill Roord	(yellow card) 43'	(substituted off) 59'
CM	8	(Germany) Lena Lattwein	(yellow card) 67'
LW	28	(Germany) Tabea Waßmuth		(substituted off) 72'
CF	17	(Poland) Ewa Pajor		(substituted off) 83'
Substitutes:
GK	77	(Poland) Katarzyna Kiedrzynek
DF	24	(Germany) Joelle Wedemeyer		(substituted in) 59'
MF	33	(Germany) Turid Knaak		(substituted in) 83'
FW	7	(Germany) Pauline Bremer		(substituted in) 83'
FW	11	(Germany) Alexandra Popp		(substituted in) 59'
FW	15	(Germany) Sandra Starke
FW	32	(Iceland) Sveindís Jane Jónsdóttir		(substituted in) 72'
Manager:
(Germany) Tommy Stroot

GK	41	(Germany) Anna Wellmann
RB	21	(Germany) Anna Gerhardt
CB	28	(Germany) Merle Barth
CB	23	(France) Teninsoun Sissoko		(substituted off) 80'
LB	2	(Slovenia) Sara Agrež (c)
CM	8	(Poland) Małgorzata Mesjasz
CM	24	(Denmark) Karen Holmgaard		(substituted off) 64'
RW	6	(Austria) Maria Plattner		(substituted off) 64'
AM	14	(Germany) Sophie Weidauer
LW	11	(Germany) Dina Orschmann		(substituted off) 55'
CF	25	(Germany) Melissa Kössler	(yellow card) 16'
Substitutes:
GK	30	(Germany) Vanessa Fischer
DF	4	(Israel) Irena Kuznetsov		(substituted in) 80'
DF	13	(Germany) Isabel Kerschowski		(substituted in) 55'
DF	26	(Denmark) Sara Holmgaard
MF	16	(Germany) Luca Maria Graf
FW	15	(Germany) Pauline Deutsch		(substituted in) 64'
FW	17	(Germany) Viktoria Schwalm		(substituted in) 64'
Manager:
(Tunisia) Sofian Chahed

Assistant referees:
Christina Biehl
Daniela Göttlinger
Fourth official:
Laura Duske

Match rules

- 90 minutes.
- 30 minutes of extra time if necessary.
- Penalty shoot-out if scores still level.
- Nine named substitutes.
- Maximum of five substitutions, with a sixth allowed in extra time. (Note: Each team were only given three opportunities to make substitutions, with a fourth opportunity in extra time, excluding substitutions made at half-time, before the start of extra time and at half-time in extra time.)

== Top goalscorers ==
The following players were the top scorers of the DFB-Pokal, sorted first by number of goals, and then alphabetically if necessary. Goals scored in penalty shoot-outs are not included.

Rank	Player	Team	Goals
1	(Serbia) Jovana Damnjanović	Bayern Munich	6
1	(Germany) Lotta Fernholz	Sportfreunde Siegen	6
1	(Germany) Pauline Fernholz	Sportfreunde Siegen	6
1	(Germany) Indra Hahn	SV Henstedt-Ulzburg	6
5	(Germany) Selina Cerci	Turbine Potsdam	5
5	(Hungary) Dóra Zeller	Bayer Leverkusen	5
7	(Germany) Hasret Kayikçi	SC Freiburg	4
7	(Germany) Maria Lange	RB Leipzig	4
7	(Netherlands) Jill Roord	VfL Wolfsburg	4
10	13 players		3
