= Kathrin Hendrich =

German footballer (born 1992)

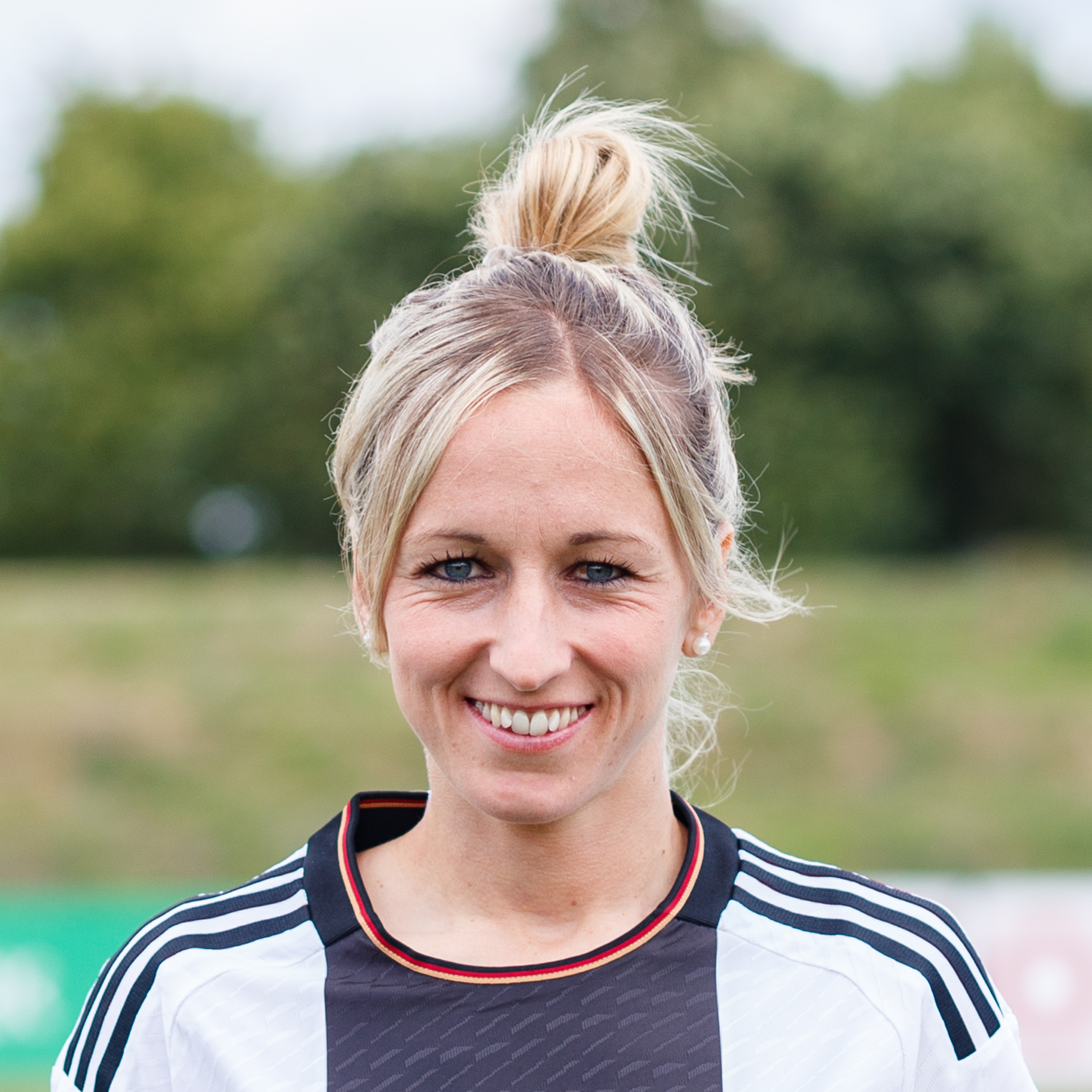
- Hendrich with Germany in 2023

Personal information
- Full name: Kathrin Julia Hendrich
- Date of birth: 6 April 1992 (age 34)
- Place of birth: Eupen, Belgium
- Height: 1.74 m (5 ft 9 in)
- Position: Centre-back

Team information
- Current team: 1. FC Köln
- Number: 4

Youth career
- 1999–2003: FC Eupen
- 2003–2009: FC Teutonia Weiden

Senior career*
Years	Team	Apps	(Gls)
2009–2014	Bayer Leverkusen	104	(4)
2014–2018	1. FFC Frankfurt	86	(4)
2018–2020	Bayern Munich	40	(3)
2020–2025	VfL Wolfsburg	92	(4)
2025–2026	Chicago Stars	23	(0)
2026–	1. FC Köln	3	(0)

International career^{‡}
2007	Germany U15	5	(0)
2007–2008	Germany U16	8	(1)
2009–2011	Germany U19	16	(0)
2011–2012	Germany U20	11	(0)
2014–	Germany	91	(5)
Medal record
Women's football
Representing Germany
Olympic Games
Bronze medal – third place	2024 Paris	Team
UEFA Women's Championship
Runner-up	2022 England
UEFA Women's Nations League
Bronze medal – third place	2024 France–Netherlands–Spain
- * Club domestic league appearances and goals as of 21:21, 18 November 2026 (UTC) ‡ National team caps and goals as of 22:45, 5 June 2026 (UTC)

Kathrin Julia Hendrich (born 6 April 1992) is a professional footballer who plays as a centre-back for Frauen-Bundesliga club 1. FC Köln. Born in Belgium, she plays for the Germany national team. She has previously been a member of Bayer Leverkusen, 1. FFC Frankfurt, Bayern Munich, and VfL Wolfsburg, as well as the Chicago Stars of the National Women's Soccer League (NWSL).

== Youth career ==
Hendrich was born in Belgium to a Belgian mother and German father. She began her career at the age of seven in her hometown with FC Eupen 1963 before joining FC Teutonia Weiden after four years in the summer of 2003.

== Club career ==
For the 2009–10 season, she left the club from Würselen and moved to division Bayer 04 Leverkusen. With Leverkusen succeeded in this season promotion to the Bundesliga. There she made her debut on 15 August 2010 (1st matchday) in the 9–0 defeat in the away game against FCR 2001 Duisburg. On 25 September 2011, she scored her first Bundesliga goal in a game against 1. FC Lokomotive Leipzig when she scored to make it 1–0.

On 13 February 2014, Hendrich announced her move to 1. FFC Frankfurt for the 2014–15 season, where she received a contract that ran until 30 June 2016. With Frankfurt, she won the final of the UEFA Women's Champions League on 14 May 2015.

For the 2018–19 season, she was signed by FC Bayern Munich and made her debut on 23 September 2018 (2nd matchday) in a 4–0 win at home against MSV Duisburg after being substituted on in the 76th minute. She scored her first Bundesliga goal for Bayern Munich on 2 December 2018 (matchday 10) in an away game at SC Freiburg with the equalizing goal in the 17th minute.

For the 2020–21 season, Hendrich was signed by league rivals and German champions VfL Wolfsburg and signing a contract until 30 June 2022. She remained with the club until 2025, winning the Bundesliga in 2021–22 and the DFB-Pokal four occasions. During the 2022–23 season, she was regarded as one of the league's leading centre backs.

On 11 June 2025, NWSL club Chicago Stars FC signed Hendrich to a two-year deal with a mutual option. On 1 August, Hendrich debuted with the Stars, coming in as a second-half substitute for Cari Roccaro in a 1–1 draw with Gotham FC.

After one year in Chicago, Hendrich returned to Germany, signing a two-year deal with 1. FC Köln in August 2026.

== International career ==
=== Youth ===
Hendrich made her national team debut on 11 April 2007 in Buckinghamshire for the U-15 national team in a 2–0 win over England. In the following four games in 2007, she was also used. For the U-16 national team, she played eight international matches, for the first time on 30 October 2007 in Wiesloch in a 7–0 victory over France, last time on 5 July 2008 in Reykjavík in a 5–0 victory over France in the Competition for the Nordic Cup. In this tournament she also scored her only international goal at the juniors with the interim 6–0 in a 7–0 win over Norway on 30 June 2008.

She played for the U-19 national team for the first time on 27 October 2009, when they defeated Sweden 1–0 in Hamelin. She took part in both the 2010 U19 European Championship in Macedonia (losing against France in the semi-finals) and the following year in Italy for the 2011 Championship, where she took the team to the final against Norway, and Germany won 8–1. In October 2011, Hendrich made her debut for the U20 national team in a friendly against Belgium, with which she took part in the 2012 World Cup. The team reached the final without conceding a goal, but lost 1–0 to the USA and became runners-up.

=== Senior ===
On 24 February 2014 Hendrich was invited to take part in the 2014 Algarve Cup and was thus called up to the squad for the senior national team for the first time. On 5 March 2014, she made her debut there in the 5–0 opening win against the national team of Iceland in Albufeira, when she came on for Lena Goeßling in the 62nd minute.

For the 2017 European Championships in the Netherlands, coach Steffi Jones called Hendrich to the German team, which was knocked out by Denmark in the quarter-finals; Hendrich was deployed.

Hendrich was called up to the Germany squad for the 2019 FIFA Women's World Cup. At the 2019 World Cup, she was used in two games in the preliminary round. The German team reached the quarterfinals.

On 18 June 2022, Hendrich was called up to the 23-player Germany squad for the UEFA Women's Euro 2022. At the 2022 European Championship, Hendrich was a regular player in all of the German team's games. Her team was defeated by hosts England in the final in a sold-out Wembley Stadium.

Hendrich was called up to the Germany squad for the 2023 FIFA Women's World Cup.

On 3 July 2024, Hendrich was called up to the Germany squad for the 2024 Summer Olympics.

On 12 June 2025, Hendrich was called up to the Germany squad for the UEFA Women's Euro 2025. On 19 July 2025 in the Euros quarter-final in Basel, Switzerland, Hendrich was sent off for pulling a French player's hair. The subsequent penalty put France 1–0 up.

== Personal life ==
Hendrich is in a relationship with Sebastian Griesbeck.

== Career statistics ==
=== International ===
As of 5 June 2026

Appearances and goals by national team and year
National team	Year	Apps	Goals
Germany
Germany	2014	6	0
Germany	2015	2	0
Germany	2016	6	1
Germany	2017	7	2
Germany	2018	5	0
Germany	2019	7	1
Germany	2020	3	0
Germany	2021	8	1
Germany	2022	11	0
Germany	2023	12	0
Germany	2024	15	0
Germany	2025	8	0
Germany	2026	1	0
Total		91	5

Scores and results list Germany's goal tally first, score column indicates score after each Hendrich goal.

List of international goals scored by Kathrin Hendrich
No.	Date	Venue	Opponent	Score	Result	Competition
1	16 September 2016	Khimki, Russia	Russia	3–0	4–0	UEFA Women's Euro 2017 qualifying
2	16 September 2017	Ingolstadt, Germany	Slovenia	3–0	6–0	2019 FIFA Women's World Cup qualifying
3	24 October 2017	Großaspach, Germany	Faroe Islands	5–0	11–0	2019 FIFA Women's World Cup qualifying
4	6 April 2019	Stockholm, Sweden	Sweden	1–0	2–1	Friendly
5	10 April 2021	Wiesbaden, Germany	Australia	2–0	5–2	Friendly

== Honours ==
Bayer 04 Leverkusen

- 2. Frauen-Bundesliga: 2009–10

1. FFC Frankfurt

- UEFA Women's Champions League: 2014–15

VfL Wolfsburg

- Frauen-Bundesliga: 2021–22
- DFB-Pokal Frauen: 2020–21, 2021–22, 2022–23

Germany U19

- UEFA Women's Under-19 Championship: 2011

Germany U20

- FIFA U-20 World Cup runners-up: 2012

Germany

- Summer Olympics bronze medal: 2024
- UEFA Women's Championship runner-up: 2022
- UEFA Women's Nations League third place: 2023–24
- Algarve Cup: 2014

Individual

- Silbernes Lorbeerblatt: 2024
