= Dominique Janssen =

Dutch footballer (born 1995)

- Janssen with Manchester United in 2026

Personal information
- Full name: Dominique Johanna Anna Petrone Janssen
- Date of birth: 17 January 1995 (age 31)
- Place of birth: Horst aan de Maas, Netherlands
- Height: 1.74 m (5 ft 9 in)
- Positions: Defender; defensive midfielder

Team information
- Current team: Manchester United
- Number: 17

Youth career
- 2013: RKsv Wittenhorst

Senior career*
Years	Team	Apps	(Gls)
2013–2015	SGS Essen	42	(3)
2015–2019	Arsenal	66	(11)
2019–2024	VfL Wolfsburg	98	(20)
2024–	Manchester United	50	(3)

International career^{‡}
2010	Netherlands U15	3	(0)
2010–2011	Netherlands U16	8	(0)
2011–2012	Netherlands U17	14	(3)
2012–2014	Netherlands U19	24	(0)
2014–	Netherlands	138	(7)
Medal record
Women's football
Representing the Netherlands
FIFA Women's World Cup
Runner-up	2019 France
UEFA Women's Championship
Winner	2017 Netherlands
- * Club domestic league appearances and goals as of 19:05, 22 November 2026 (UTC) ‡ National team caps and goals as of 13 October 2026

Dominique Johanna Anna Petrone Janssen (Dutch: [doːmiˈnik joːˈɦɑnaː ˈʔɑnaː ˈjɑnsə(n)]; formerly Bloodworth; born 17 January 1995) is a Dutch professional footballer who plays as a defender or defensive midfielder for Women's Super League club Manchester United and captains the Netherlands national team.

== Club career ==
Janssen played in the B-Youth team for her first club, RKSV Wittenhorst. In the summer of 2013, she joined German Frauen-Bundesliga side SGS Essen, turning down offers from Dutch clubs PSV/FC Eindhoven and AFC Ajax. On 8 September, Janssen made her debut for Essen in their first league game of the season, a 3–3 draw versus BV Cloppenburg. She scored her first goal for Essen on 3 November in the 5–1 win against Hoffenheim.

In 2015, Janssen signed for English side Arsenal. This move proved to be fruitful, with Janssen winning the WSL Cup of 2015 thanks to Arsenal's 3–0 victory over Notts County. She once again played in another Cup final the following season, this being the 2016 FA Cup final which took place on 14 May. Arsenal beat Chelsea 1–0 in the match at Wembley to be crowned winners and earn their fourteenth FA Cup title.

Following a second FA WSL Cup triumph in 2017–18, Dominique played in 19 of Arsenal's 20 league games and scored three goals as the team won the 2018–19 Women's Super League. She ended up making 100 club appearances for Arsenal.

After four years with the Gunners, Janssen signed for German champions Wolfsburg in 2019. She enjoyed a very successful period with Die Wölfinnen, winning two Frauen-Bundesliga titles and a five consecutive DFB-Pokal Frauen Cups.

Janssen was a key player for Wolfsburg throughout her time there, playing over 150 matches across five seasons. She started both the 2020 and 2023 UEFA Women's Champions League finals for Wolfsburg, but narrowly missed out on European glory on each occasion as Lyon and Barcelona emerged victorious with 3-1 and 3-2 wins respectively.

On 2 July 2024, having announced back in May that she was set to leave Wolfsburg upon the expiry of her contract, Janssen signed for Manchester United on a three-year deal with the option to extend for a further year. She made her debut on 21 September, starting in an opening day 3–0 win at Old Trafford against West Ham. Janssen moved into a defensive midfield role during her initial months in the team and scored her first United goal on 8 December in a 4–0 win over Liverpool, whilst also providing two assists. She moved back to a regular centre-back role in the 2025–26 season, partnering United captain Maya Le Tissier.

== International career ==
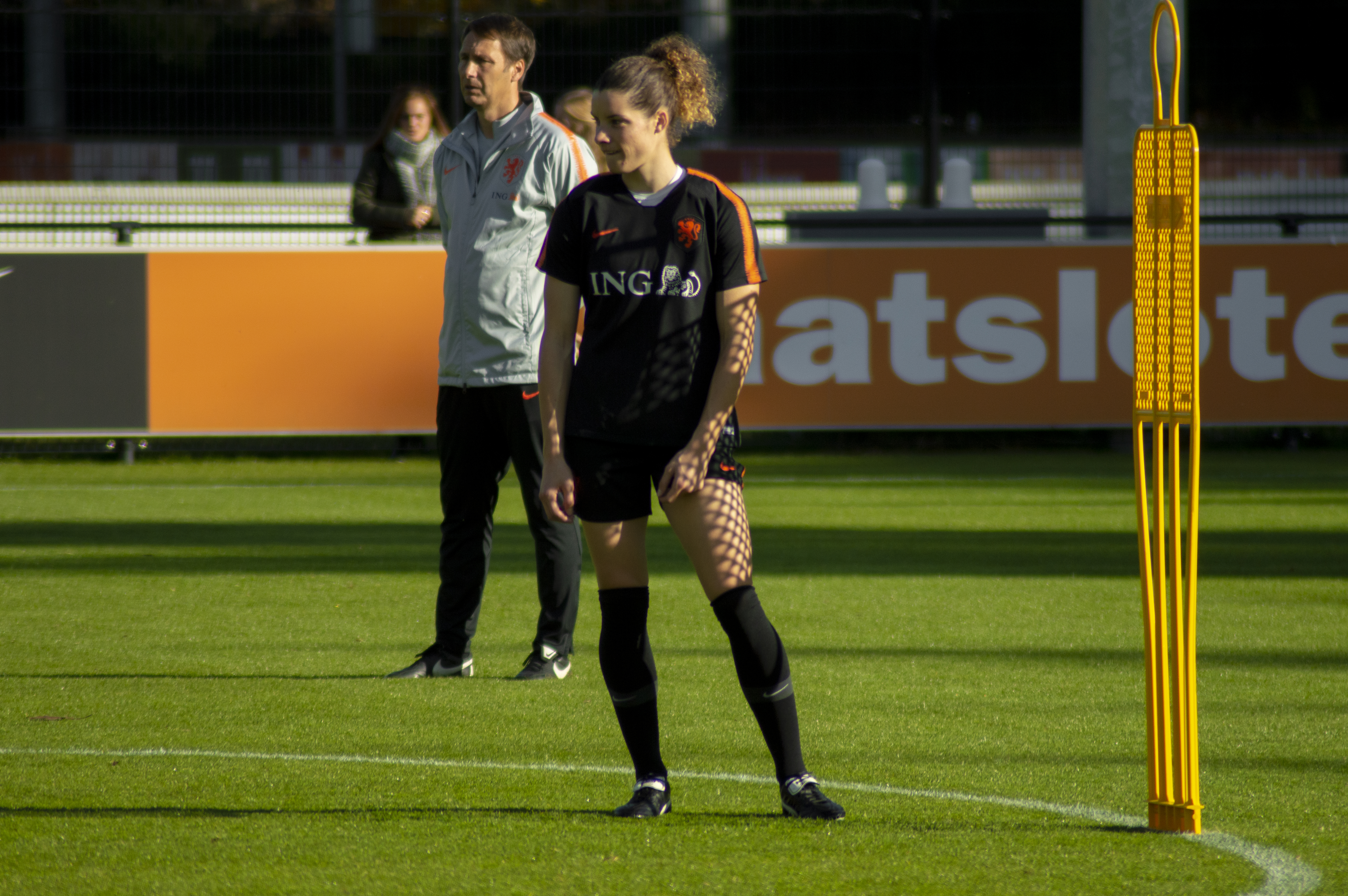
Dominique Janssen training with the Netherlands on 6 November 2018

Janssen played for the first time for a Junior selection of Royal Dutch Football Association on 17 March 2010 at the friendly match of U-15 national team against England. In 2012, she was captain of the Dutch U-17 team in the qualifying matches for the 2012 UEFA Women's Under-17 Championship and also led the team, as captain, in qualifying for the 2013 UEFA Women's Under-19 Championship. In 2014, she succeeded with her team to qualify for the final round the 2014 UEFA Women's Under-19 Championship in Norway, where Netherlands won the title for the first time with 1–0 victory against Spain. Janssen played all five matches in the tournament.

In 2014, she was called for the senior team for the first time, taking part in the Netherlands squad for the 2014 Cyprus Cup. On 5 March 2014, she made her debut, coming off the bench in the 65th minute at 2–2 against Australia. Janssen was then a part of the Dutch team that reached the 2015 World Cup Round of 16.

Dominique was a member of the Netherlands team that won Euro 2017 on home soil. Capturing the support of the entire nation, Sarina Wiegman's side beat Sweden and England in the quarter-finals and semi-finals respectively without conceding a goal in order to reach the final against Denmark.

The Dutch won the final 4–2 to secure their very first UEFA Women's Championship title and Janssen featured in the historic match when she replaced Desiree van Lunteren in the 57th minute as a substitute for the Oranje. After winning the 2017 European Championships, the whole team was honoured by the Prime Minister Mark Rutte and Minister of Sport Edith Schippers and they were made Knights of the Order of Orange-Nassau.

In 2019, she was included in the Dutch squad for the 2019 World Cup. The Netherlands won every group stage match and reached the final, eventually losing 2–0 to the United States. Janssen played in all seven of the Leeuwinnen's games and didn't miss a single minute. In the second group game against Cameroon, she scored her first international goal.

In the subsequent qualification for the 2022 European Championships, she played in nine out of ten games and scored one goal. With ten wins, the Dutch qualified for the finals, which were postponed by a year due to the COVID-19 pandemic. For the same reason, the 2020 Olympic Games, for which the Dutch had qualified for the first time as runners-up in the World Cup, were also postponed by one year. Janssen played in victories against Zambia (10–3) and China (8–2) as well as the 3–3 draw with Brazil, where she scored the final goal to produce a 3–3 scoreline, before losing on penalties to the world champion U.S. team in the quarter-finals. In the 2023 World Cup qualification, she was used six times in the first seven games.

On 31 May 2022, Janssen was nominated for the European Championship finals and completed all four games of the Dutch team there. In the quarterfinals against France, she committed a foul in extra-time which led to France's decisive penalty goal.

On 31 May 2023, Janssen was named as part of the Netherlands provisional squad for the 2023 World Cup, and she featured for the team which reached the quarter-finals of the competition, before losing 2–1 after extra-time to eventual tournament winners Spain.

In November 2025, following the international retirement of Sherida Spitse in the previous month, Janssen was announced as the new captain of the Dutch women's national team. Speaking about the appointment, she said: "I'm incredibly proud. I feel the trust from the staff, and I can't wait to take on this role. I won't change as a player. I just get to walk out first and do the toss, the rest stays the same."

=== International goals ===
Scores and results list the Netherlands goal tally first.

G	Date	Venue	Opponent	Score	Result	Competition
1.	15 June 2019	Stade du Hainaut, Valenciennes, France	Cameroon	2–1	3–1	2019 FIFA Women's World Cup
2.	30 August 2019	A. Le Coq Arena, Tallinn, Estonia	Estonia	6–0	7–0	2021 UEFA Women's Euro qualification
3.	15 June 2021	De Grolsch Veste, Enschede, Netherlands	Norway	4–0	7–0	Friendly
4.	24 July 2021	Miyagi Stadium, Rifu, Japan	Brazil	3–3	3–3	2020 Olympics
5.	11 November 2022	Stadion Galgenwaard, Utrecht, Netherlands	Costa Rica	2–0	4–0	Friendly
6.	15 November 2022	MAC³PARK Stadion, Zwolle, Netherlands	Denmark	1–0	2–0	Friendly
7.	5 June 2026	Páirc Uí Chaoimh, Cork, Republic of Ireland	Republic of Ireland	1–1	2–3	2027 FIFA Women's World Cup qualification

== Personal life ==
In 2018, Janssen married Brandon Bloodworth and adopted his last name. Bloodworth is a US Air Force veteran and they met in London. He was an NCAA Division 1 track and field sprinter from California. In 2020, Janssen announced that she and Bloodworth had separated and she reverted to using her maiden name. She is in a relationship with German former professional footballer Patrick Platins.

== Honours ==
Arsenal

- FA Women's Cup: 2015–16
- FA WSL Cup: 2015, 2017–18
- FA Women's Super League: 2018–19

VfL Wolfsburg

- UEFA Women's Champions League runners-up: 2019-20, 2022–23
- Frauen Bundesliga: 2019–20, 2021–22,
- DFB Pokal: 2019–20, 2020–21, 2021–22, 2022–23, 2023–24

Manchester United

- Women's FA Cup runner-up: 2024–25
- Women's League Cup runner-up: 2025–26

Netherlands U19

- UEFA Women's Under-19 Championship: 2014

Netherlands

- UEFA Women's Euro: 2017
- FIFA Women's World Cup: runners-up 2019
- Algarve Cup: 2018

Individual

- Knight of the Order of Orange-Nassau: 2017
