= Lotta Cordes =

German footballer (born 2001)

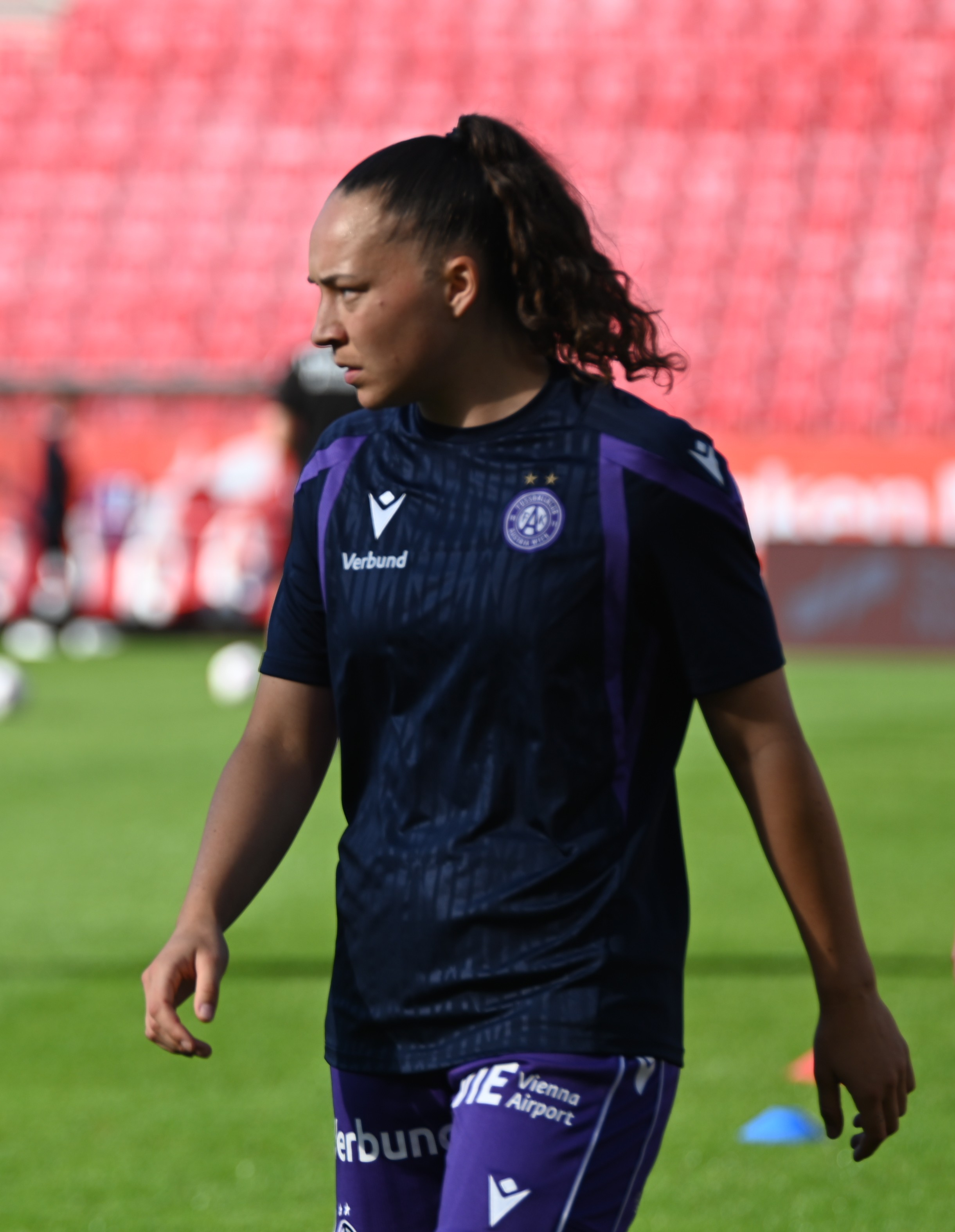
- Lotta Cordes in 2026

Personal information
- Date of birth: April 27, 2001 (age 25)
- Place of birth: Nienburg/Weser, Germany
- Position: Midfielder

Team information
- Current team: FK Austria Wien
- Number: 6

Youth career
- 2016–2018: VfL Wolfsburg

Senior career*
Years	Team	Apps	(Gls)
2017–2022	VfL Wolfsburg II	71	(10)
2017–2022	VfL Wolfsburg	11	(0)
2022–2025	1. FC Köln	22	(0)
2025–	FK Austria Wien	11	(3)

International career
2019	Germany U19	4	(0)
- * Club domestic league appearances and goals as of 21 November 2026

Lotta Cordes (born April 27, 2001) is a German football player who plays for ÖFB Frauen Bundesliga club FK Austria Wien.

== Club career ==
Cordes last played from 2016 to 2018 for the B youth team of VfL Wolfsburg in the North/Northeast season of the B Junior Bundesliga. After she played in five league games in her first season, twelve league games followed in the second season, in which she scored two goals. As the 2018 season winner, she and her team moved into the final round of the German B Junior Championship, where she and her team won the title with a 4–1 victory over 1. FC Köln; She contributed significantly with two goals.

In the 2017/18 season, she was used for the second team of VfL Wolfsburg in 13 league games in the North Group of the then two-tier 2nd Bundesliga. She made her senior debut on October 29, 2017, in the 2–0 win in the away game against FSV Gütersloh 2009 as a substitute in injury time. She scored her first of two goals of the season on March 11, 2018, in a 4–0 win in the away game against BV Cloppenburg. By the end of the 2021/22 season, she played 58 games and scored eight goals.

From 2020 to 2022 she was a member of the first team, for which she played her first nine Bundesliga games in her first season. Her first took place at the start of the season on September 4, 2020, in the 3–0 win in the home game against SGS Essen, in which she came on as a substitute for Ingrid Syrstad Engen in the 78th minute. She also played five national cup games, with which she contributed to the later cup wins, and six international cup games in the Champions League for the club.

In order to gain more match practice, she was signed by league rivals 1. FC Köln for the 2022/23 season, who tied her to a contract until June 30, 2024. She played eleven times on the first twelve matchdays. She also played three games in the DFB Cup competition, in which she scored a goal in the first, on September 11, 2022, in the 8–0 second round win against SV Elversberg.

On 7 July 2025, Cordes completed her first move abroad by signing with Austrian club FK Austria Wien.

== International career ==
Cordes played four tournament games for the DFB national cup at the Wedau sports school in Duisburg as a player for the Lower Saxony Football Association's U14 team from May 2 to 5, 2015.

As a national player, she made her debut in the U19 national team, which won the friendly international match against Belgium 3–0 in Wuustwezel on August 30, 2019. She came on as a substitute for Leonie Köster in the second half of the game. She was involved in two further victories on October 2 and 8, 2019 in the first round of qualification for the 2020 European Championships, 8–0 over Albania and 4–1 over Portugal.

== Achievements ==
- DFB Bundesliga 2022
- DFB Cup winners 2021, 2022
- ÖFB Frauen-Bundesliga 2025/26
- ÖFB Frauen Cup 2025/26
