= Alexandra Popp =

German footballer (born 1991)

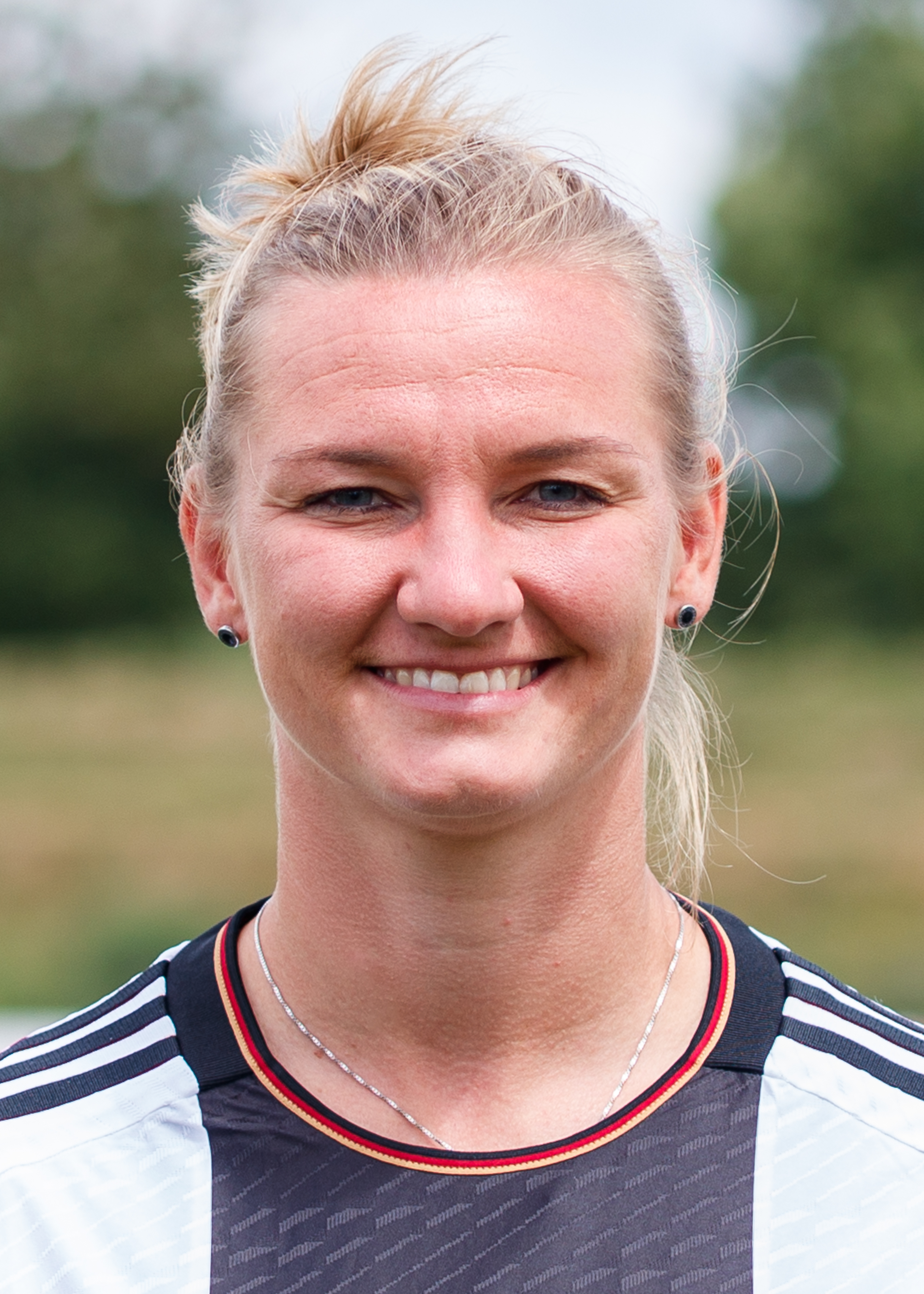
- Popp with Germany in 2023

Personal information
- Full name: Alexandra Popp-Höppe
- Birth name: Alexandra Popp
- Date of birth: 6 April 1991 (age 35)
- Place of birth: Witten, Germany
- Height: 1.74 m (5 ft 9 in)
- Position: Striker

Team information
- Current team: Borussia Dortmund
- Number: 11

Youth career
- FC Silschede
- 1. FFC Recklinghausen

Senior career*
Years	Team	Apps	(Gls)
2007–2008	1. FFC Recklinghausen		
2008–2012	FCR 2001 Duisburg	80	(31)
2012–2026	VfL Wolfsburg	219	(112)
2026–	Borussia Dortmund	0	(0)

International career
2006	Germany U15	5	(0)
2006–2008	Germany U17	25	(17)
2009	Germany U19	8	(6)
2009–2011	Germany U20	9	(14)
2010–2024	Germany	145	(67)
Medal record
Olympic Games
Gold medal – first place	2016 Rio de Janeiro	Team
Bronze medal – third place	2024 Paris	Team
UEFA Women's Championship
Silver medal – second place	2022 England
UEFA Women's Nations League
Bronze medal – third place	2024 France–Netherlands–Spain
- * Club domestic league appearances and goals as of 14 September 2024

Alexandra Popp-Höppe (née Popp; German pronunciation: [alɛˈksandʁa ˈpɔp]; born 6 April 1991) is a German professional footballer who plays as a striker for Frauen-Regionalliga club Borussia Dortmund. Popp was named German Footballer of the Year three times, in 2014, 2016 and 2023, captained the German national team between 2019 and 2024, and is her country's third all-time top scorer. She will join Borussia Dortmund in the 2026–27 season.

== Early life ==
Popp attended Gesamtschule Berger Feld in Gelsenkirchen, one of four facilities certified as "elite schools of football" by the German Football Association. She was the school's sole female pupil and could only attend courtesy of a special permit. She studied and trained with junior players of the German men's Bundesliga side FC Schalke 04. Popp left school after the 12th grade with a Fachabitur diploma.

== Club career ==
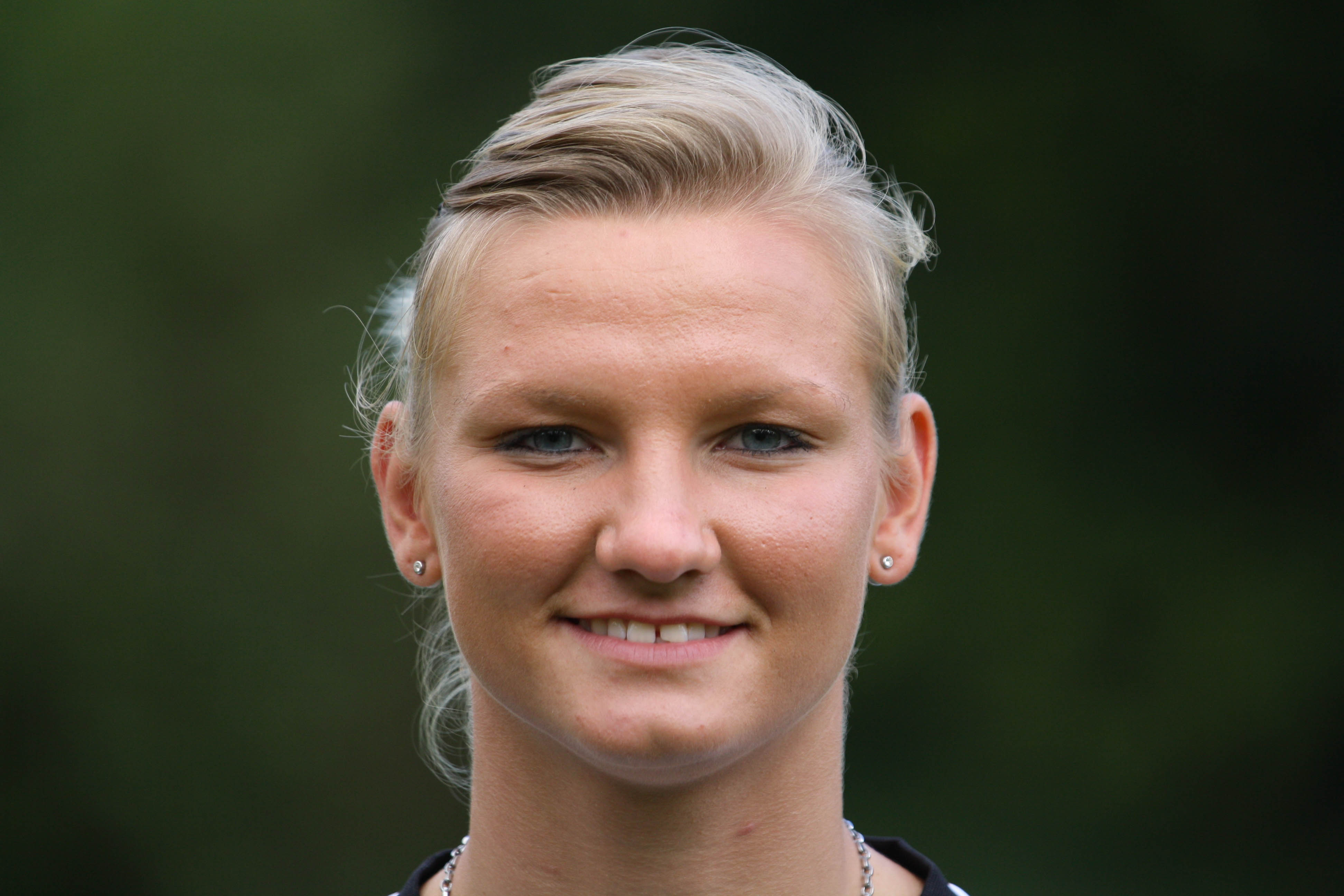
Popp with Duisburg in 2011

Popp started her career at FC Silschede, playing there in mixed-gender teams until she reached the age limit of 14. Later she changed to 1. FFC Recklinghausen and played three years before joining the Bundesliga side FCR 2001 Duisburg in 2008. She had also been approached by French champions Olympique Lyonnais at the time, but chose Duisburg. Popp made her Bundesliga debut in September 2008 against Herforder SV and scored her first two goals three weeks later in an 8–0 win over TSV Crailsheim.

In her first year at Duisburg, Popp won the Double: the 2009 UEFA Women's Cup and the 2009 German Cup. She was awarded the 2009 Fritz Walter medal in silver as the year's second best female junior player. One year later, she again claimed the DFB-Pokal trophy with Duisburg and finished as 2009–10 Bundesliga runners-up. Due to Duisburg's major injury problems during the 2010–11 season, Popp played the majority of matches at left back.

In 2012, Popp transferred to VfL Wolfsburg, moving with her club teammate Luisa Wensing ahead of the 2012–13 campaign. In her first season at Wolfsburg, she scored 16 goals and won the treble: Frauen-Bundesliga championship, the DFB-Pokal Frauen and the UEFA Women's Champions League.

A year later, Wolfsburg successfully defended their UEFA Women's Champions League title. The 2013–14 Bundesliga title came down to a top of the table clash on the final matchday of the season, where Wolfsburg played against the unbeaten 1. FFC Frankfurt, who only needed a draw to win the championship. Popp scored an 89th-minute winning goal to secure a dramatic title for Die Wölfinnen, and the game set a new Bundesliga record with 12,464 spectators in attendance.

Popp helped Wolfsburg win four consecutive Bundesliga titles between from 2016–17 to the 2019–20 season. In August 2019, following the departure of Nilla Fischer, Popp was named as the new Wolfsburg captain alongside teammates Pernille Harder and Almuth Schult, a further sign of her strong mentality.

During her over decade-long spell at Wolfsburg, Popp has scored 147 goals in over 300 games for the club, winning seven league titles, two UEFA Women's Champions Leagues and 11 German Cup trophies.

Despite tough injury setbacks in her career, Popp has scored at least ten league goals in six different seasons for Wolfsburg and she helped the club to win a remarkable ten DFB-Pokal Frauen Cups in a row between 2014–15 and 2023–24. Wolfsburg's captain finished the 2022–23 season as both the Bundesliga top goalscorer (16 goals) and the Pokal's leading scorer (5 goals).

In November 2024, Popp extended her contract at Wolfsburg up to June 2026. Popp is the sixth-highest goalscorer in Frauen-Bundesliga history.

On 14 March 2026, Popp agreed to a three-year contract with Borussia Dortmund, beginning with the 2026–27 season.

== International career ==
At the 2008 UEFA U-17 Women's Championship, Popp won her first international title with Germany, scoring the team's second goal in the final. The same year, she reached third-place at the 2008 FIFA U-17 Women's World Cup. In February 2010, Popp made her debut for Germany's senior national team in a friendly match against North Korea. Less than two weeks later she scored her first two international goals at the 2010 Algarve Cup in a 7–0 win over Finland.

Popp returned to junior competition for the 2010 FIFA U-20 Women's World Cup on home soil. She won the title and became the tournament's best player and top goalscorer. She scored in every game that Germany played and with ten goals, she holds the scoring record for that tournament (together with Sydney Leroux and Christine Sinclair).

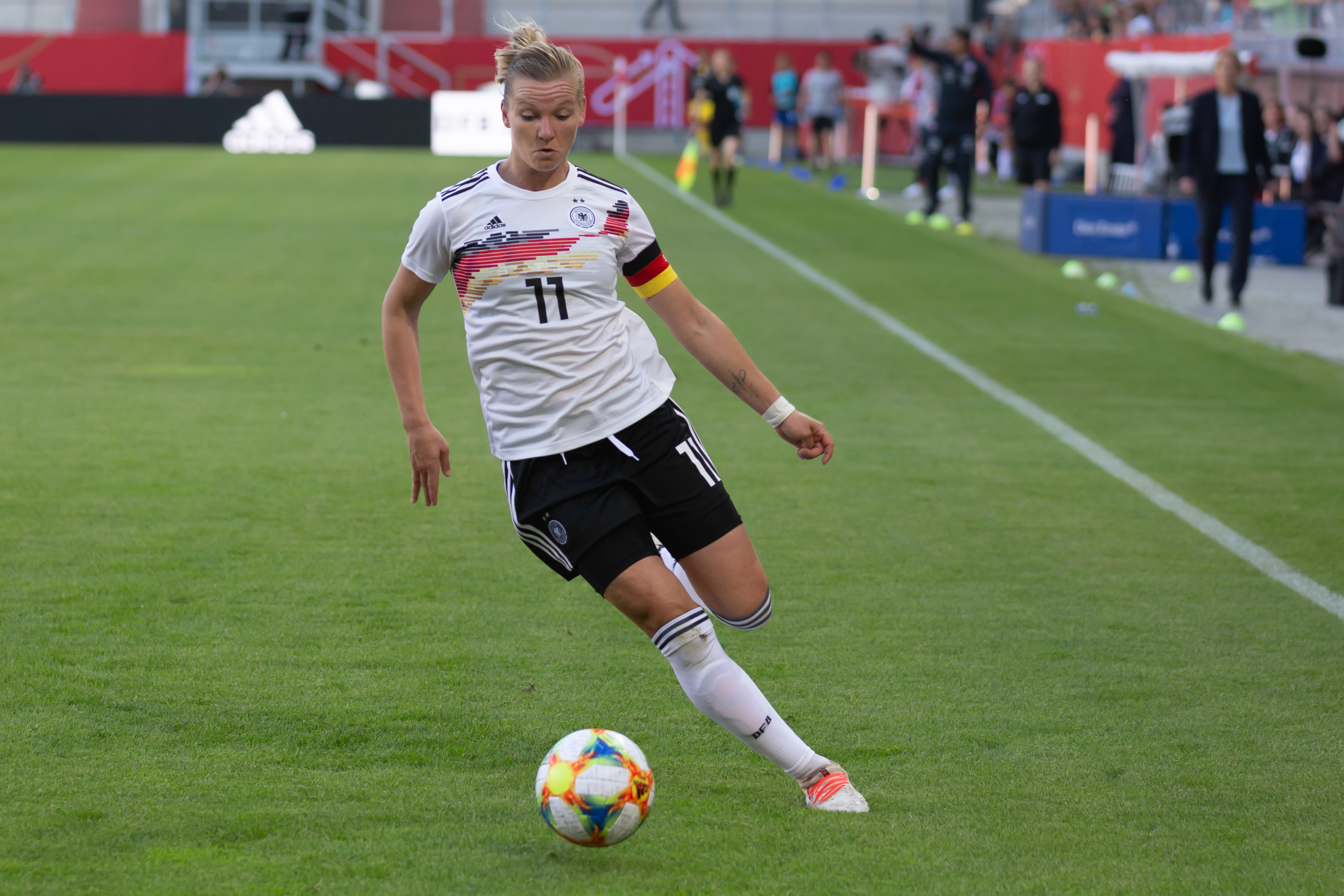
Popp during an international friendship match against Chile, 2019

Popp was then called up for the 2011 FIFA Women's World Cup. She played in all four games as a substitute, but the Germans were eliminated in the quarter-finals by eventual champions Japan. Later that year, she played in a European Championship qualifying match against Kazakhstan, where she and teammate Célia Šašić each contributed four goals to a record 17–0 victory. With this achievement, she became the seventh German woman to score four goals in an international game.

Having chosen to play in the 2013 Champions League final with a torn ligament, Popp missed UEFA Women's Euro 2013 through injury. Germany ended up winning the tournament in Sweden, beating Norway 1-0 in the final.

On 24 May 2015, Silvia Neid called Popp up for the 2015 FIFA Women's World Cup. In Canada, Germany finished fourth, defeating fellow European powerhouses Sweden and France but were eventually defeated by eventual champions the United States. Popp started in four of the team's seven games, scoring once.

Popp was called up again for the 2016 Summer Olympics, where Germany won the gold medal. She played in all six games, contributing a goal and two assists, with Germany beating Sweden 2-1 at the Maracanã in the final. Popp received the Silbernes Lorbeerblatt, Germany's highest sports honour, for her performance, along with the rest of the German team.

Alexandra missed the UEFA Women's Euro 2017 tournament due to a meniscus and lateral ligament injury. The loss of such a key player like her reasonably impacted Germany's performance, as they lost in the quarter-finals to Denmark.

In February 2019, Popp was named the new captain of the German women's national team. She captained the German squad at the 2019 FIFA Women's World Cup. Popp played every minute of the group stage and scored a header against South Africa. She made her 100th appearance for Germany on 22 June 2019, against Nigeria in the Round of 16, where she also scored the opening goal.

External videos
- All Goals: Alexandra Popp at 2022 EURO retrieved July 23, 2023

At the Euro 2022, Popp scored six goals in five matches and lead her side to the final. She scored both of Germany's goals in their semi-final win against France and became only the second player to score in four consecutive matches at a Women's Euros. A muscle injury in the pre-match warm-up forced Popp to miss the final, which hosts England won 2-1 after extra time. The Germany captain finished as the competition's joint-top scorer, alongside Beth Mead, and she was named in UEFA's Team of the Tournament.

At Germany's opening match of the 2023 FIFA Women's World Cup, Popp scored Germany's first two goals against Morocco in what was a 6-0 win. Despite Germany's failure to advance to the knockout stages, Popp scored in all three of their group games and finished as the tournament's joint-second top scorer with four goals.

On 3 July 2024, Popp was called up to the Germany squad for the 2024 Summer Olympics.

On 30 September 2024, Popp announced her retirement from international football, with her last game being played on 28 October. With 67 goals in 145 international appearances, Popp is Germany's third top scorer and ninth most capped player of all time (as of November 2024).

She played at four World Cups and one European Championship, and won two Olympic medals and three Algarve Cups with Germany. Individually, Popp's performances saw her chosen as Women's National Team Player of the Year in 2012 and 2022, and she is a three-time Germany Women's Footballer of the Year, winning the award in 2014, 2016 and 2023.

== Personal life ==
Following a one-year internship as a physiotherapist, Popp successfully completed a three-year apprenticeship to become a zookeeper at Tierpark Essehof in Lehre. Popp married her partner Patrick Höppe in 2021. On her Instagram channel she regularly posts pictures of her dog Patch.

== Career statistics ==
As of 9 August 2024

Appearances and goals by national team and year
National team	Year	Apps	Goals
Germany	2010	8	4
Germany	2011	13	10
Germany	2012	10	5
Germany	2013	8	3
Germany	2014	9	2
Germany	2015	14	7
Germany	2016	15	4
Germany	2017	6	5
Germany	2018	10	4
Germany	2019	13	9
Germany	2020	2	0
Germany	2021	3	0
Germany	2022	13	8
Germany	2023	11	6
Germany	2024	9	0
Total		144	67

Scores and results list Germany's goal tally first, score column indicates score after each Popp goal.

List of international goals scored by Alexandra Popp
No.	Date	Venue	Opponent	Score	Result	Competition
1	26 February 2010	Parchal, Portugal	Finland	2–0	7–0	2010 Algarve Cup
2	26 February 2010	Parchal, Portugal	Finland	4–0	7–0	2010 Algarve Cup
3	15 September 2010	Dresden, Germany	Canada	3–0	5–0	Friendly
4	25 November 2010	Leverkusen, Germany	Nigeria	6–0	8–0	Friendly
5	3 June 2011	Osnabrück, Germany	Italy	2–0	5–0	Friendly
6	3 June 2011	Osnabrück, Germany	Italy	5–0	5–0	Friendly
7	7 June 2011	Aachen, Germany	Netherlands	3–0	5–0	Friendly
8	16 June 2011	Mainz, Germany	Norway	2–0	3–0	Friendly
9	16 June 2011	Mainz, Germany	Norway	3–0	3–0	Friendly
10	26 October 2011	Hamburg, Germany	Sweden	1–0	1–0	Friendly
11	19 November 2011	Wiesbaden, Germany	Kazakhstan	2–0	17–0	UEFA Women's Euro 2013 qualifying
12	19 November 2011	Wiesbaden, Germany	Kazakhstan	4–0	17–0	UEFA Women's Euro 2013 qualifying
13	19 November 2011	Wiesbaden, Germany	Kazakhstan	8–0	17–0	UEFA Women's Euro 2013 qualifying
14	19 November 2011	Wiesbaden, Germany	Kazakhstan	12–0	17–0	UEFA Women's Euro 2013 qualifying
15	5 March 2012	Parchal, Portugal	Sweden	4–0	4–0	2012 Algarve Cup
16	31 March 2012	Mannheim, Germany	Spain	3–0	5–0	UEFA Women's Euro 2013 qualifying
17	31 May 2012	Bielefeld, Germany	Romania	2–0	5–0	UEFA Women's Euro 2013 qualifying
18	31 May 2012	Bielefeld, Germany	Romania	4–0	5–0	UEFA Women's Euro 2013 qualifying
19	31 May 2012	Bielefeld, Germany	Romania	5–0	5–0	UEFA Women's Euro 2013 qualifying
20	26 October 2013	Koper, Slovenia	Slovenia	13–0	13–0	2015 FIFA Women's World Cup qualification
21	23 November 2013	Žilina, Slovakia	Slovakia	5–0	6–0	2015 FIFA Women's World Cup qualification
22	27 November 2013	Osijek, Croatia	Croatia	6–0	8–0	2015 FIFA Women's World Cup qualification
23	5 March 2014	Albufeira, Portugal	Iceland	5–0	5–0	2014 Algarve Cup
24	29 October 2014	Örebro, Sweden	Sweden	2–1	2–1	Friendly
25	6 March 2015	Vila Real de Santo António, Portugal	China	2–0	2–0	2015 Algarve Cup
26	9 March 2015	Parchal, Portugal	Brazil	1–0	3–1	2015 Algarve Cup
27	11 March 2015	Parchal, Portugal	Sweden	2–0	2–1	2015 Algarve Cup
28	7 June 2015	Ottawa, Canada	Ivory Coast	10–0	10–0	2015 FIFA Women's World Cup
29	18 September 2015	Halle, Germany	Hungary	1–0	12–0	UEFA Women's Euro 2017 qualifying
30	18 September 2015	Halle, Germany	Hungary	9–0	12–0	UEFA Women's Euro 2017 qualifying
31	22 September 2015	Zagreb, Croatia	Croatia	1–0	1–0	UEFA Women's Euro 2017 qualifying
32	8 April 2016	Istanbul, Turkey	Turkey	4–0	6–0	UEFA Women's Euro 2017 qualifying
33	8 April 2016	Istanbul, Turkey	Turkey	5–0	6–0	UEFA Women's Euro 2017 qualifying
34	22 July 2016	Paderborn, Germany	Ghana	3–0	11–0	Friendly
35	3 August 2016	São Paulo, Brazil	Zimbabwe	2–0	6–1	2016 Summer Olympics
36	20 October 2017	Wiesbaden, Germany	Iceland	1–1	2–3	2019 FIFA Women's World Cup qualification
37	24 October 2017	Großaspach, Germany	Faroe Islands	1–0	11–0	2019 FIFA Women's World Cup qualification
38	24 October 2017	Großaspach, Germany	Faroe Islands	6–0	11–0	2019 FIFA Women's World Cup qualification
39	24 November 2017	Bielefeld, Germany	France	1–0	4–0	Friendly
40	24 November 2017	Bielefeld, Germany	France	3–0	4–0	Friendly
41	10 April 2018	Domžale, Slovenia	Slovenia	3–0	4–0	2019 FIFA Women's World Cup qualification
42	4 September 2018	Tórshavn, Faroe Islands	Faroe Islands	6–0	8–0	2019 FIFA Women's World Cup qualification
43	4 September 2018	Tórshavn, Faroe Islands	Faroe Islands	8–0	8–0	2019 FIFA Women's World Cup qualification
44	6 October 2018	Essen, Germany	Austria	1–0	3–1	Friendly
45	9 April 2019	Paderborn, Germany	Japan	1–1	2–2	Friendly
46	30 May 2019	Regensburg, Germany	Chile	1–0	2–0	Friendly
47	17 June 2019	Montpellier, France	South Africa	3–0	4–0	2019 FIFA Women's World Cup
48	22 June 2019	Grenoble, France	Nigeria	1–0	3–0	2019 FIFA Women's World Cup
49	31 August 2019	Kassel, Germany	Montenegro	2–0	10–0	UEFA Women's Euro 2022 qualifying
50	31 August 2019	Kassel, Germany	Montenegro	3–0	10–0	UEFA Women's Euro 2022 qualifying
51	31 August 2019	Kassel, Germany	Montenegro	5–0	10–0	UEFA Women's Euro 2022 qualifying
52	8 October 2019	Thessaloniki, Greece	Greece	1–0	5–0	UEFA Women's Euro 2022 qualifying
53	9 November 2019	London, England	England	1–0	2–1	Friendly
54	8 July 2022	London, England	Denmark	4–0	4–0	UEFA Women's Euro 2022
55	12 July 2022	London, England	Spain	2–0	2–0	UEFA Women's Euro 2022
56	16 July 2022	Milton Keynes, England	Finland	2–0	3–0	UEFA Women's Euro 2022
57	21 July 2022	London, England	Austria	2–0	2–0	UEFA Women's Euro 2022
58	27 July 2022	Milton Keynes, England	France	1–0	2–1	UEFA Women's Euro 2022
59	27 July 2022	Milton Keynes, England	France	2–1	2–1	UEFA Women's Euro 2022
60	7 October 2022	Dresden, Germany	France	1–0	2–1	Friendly
61	7 October 2022	Dresden, Germany	France	2–0	2–1	Friendly
62	7 July 2023	Fürth, Germany	Zambia	2–2	2–3	Friendly
63	24 July 2023	Melbourne, Australia	Morocco	1–0	6–0	2023 FIFA Women's World Cup
64	24 July 2023	Melbourne, Australia	Morocco	2–0	6–0	2023 FIFA Women's World Cup
65	30 July 2023	Sydney, Australia	Colombia	1–1	1–2	2023 FIFA Women's World Cup
66	3 August 2023	Brisbane, Australia	South Korea	1–1	1–1	2023 FIFA Women's World Cup
67	1 December 2023	Rostock, Germany	Denmark	1–0	3–0	2023–24 UEFA Women's Nations League

== Honours ==
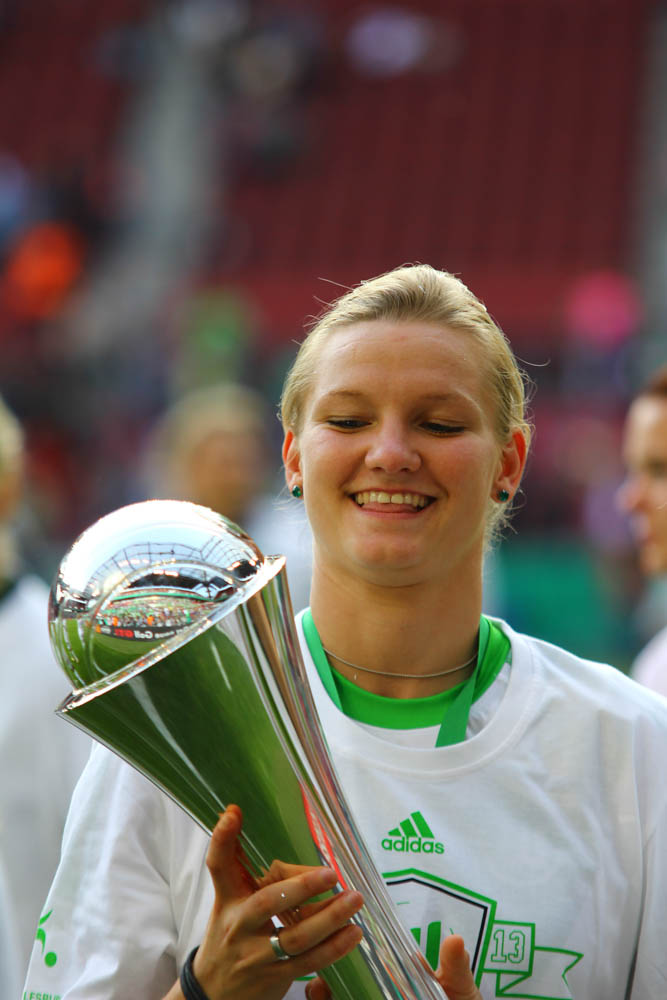
Popp with the DFB-Pokal trophy in 2013

FCR 2001 Duisburg

- UEFA Women's Champions League: 2008–09
- DFB-Pokal Frauen: 2008–09, 2009–10

VfL Wolfsburg

- UEFA Women's Champions League: 2012–13, 2013–14
- Frauen-Bundesliga: 2012–13, 2013–14, 2016–17, 2017–18, 2018–19, 2019–20, 2021–22
- DFB-Pokal Frauen: 2012–13, 2014–15, 2015–16, 2016–17, 2017–18, 2018–19, 2019–20, 2020–21, 2021–22, 2022–23, 2023–24

Germany U17

- FIFA U-17 Women's World Cup third place: 2008
- UEFA U-17 Women's Championship: 2008

Germany U20

- FIFA U-20 Women's World Cup: 2010

Germany

- Summer Olympic Games: 2016
- Summer Olympics bronze medal: 2024
- UEFA Women's Championship runner-up: 2022
- UEFA Women's Nations League third place: 2023–24
- Algarve Cup: 2012, 2014, 2020

Individual

- UEFA Women's Under-17 Championship: Golden Player 2008
- Fritz Walter Medal: Silver 2009
- FIFA U-20 Women's World Cup Golden Ball: 2010
- FIFA U-20 Women's World Cup Golden Shoe: 2010
- Footballer of the Year in Germany: 2014, 2016, 2023
- Silbernes Lorbeerblatt: 2016, 2024
- IFFHS Women's World Team: 2020, 2022
- UEFA Women's Championship Silver Boot: 2022
- UEFA Women's Championship Team of the Tournament: 2022
- Frauen-Bundesliga Top scorer: 2022–23
- DFB-Pokal Frauen Top scorer: 2022–23
- FIFA Women's World Cup Bronze Boot: 2023
- Germany women's national Player of the Year: 2022
