= Samantha Steuerwald =

German footballer (born 1998)

Personal information
- Date of birth: 11 October 1998 (age 28)
- Place of birth: Hamburg, Germany
- Height: 1.75 m (5 ft 9 in)
- Position: Defender

Team information
- Current team: 1. FC Union Berlin
- Number: 19

Youth career
- 2003–2014: Bramfelder SV
- 2014–2016: VfL Wolfsburg U17

Senior career*
| Years | Team | Apps | (Gls) |
| 2015 | Bramfelder SV | 4 | (0) |
| 2015–2018 | VfL Wolfsburg II | 51 | (9) |
| 2018–2020 | Werder Bremen | 16 | (2) |
| 2020–2025 | SC Freiburg | 101 | (8) |
| 2025– | 1. FC Union Berlin | 37 | (4) |

International career
| 2012 | Germany U15 | | |
- * Club domestic league appearances and goals as of 20 November 2026

Samantha Steuerwald (born 11 October 1998) is a German professional footballer who plays as a defender for Frauen-Bundesliga club 1. FC Union Berlin.

== Youth career ==
Steuerwald played in the Bramfelder SV youth system from the age of 5. She also competed in youth track and field events, school football, and indoor soccer. In 2008 at age 9, she told the Hamburger Abendblatt that she intended to become a professional footballer. By 2015, she was attending the Eichendorf School in Wolfsburg and playing for VfL Wolfsburg's under-17 team.

== Club career ==
=== Werder Bremen, 2018–2020 ===
2. Frauen-Bundesliga club Werder Bremen signed Steuerwald on 10 July 2018, where she played as a striker.

=== SC Freiburg, 2020–2025 ===
Frauen-Bundesliga club SC Freiburg signed Steuerwald on 25 June 2020 along with Werder Bremen teammate Luisa Wensing. The club converted her from playing forward to defense during her first season.

On 16 January 2023, Steuerwald extended her contract with Freiburg.

Steurwald played in the 2022–23 DFB-Pokal Frauen final against Wolfsburg, which Freiburg lost 1–4.

=== 1. FC Union Berlin, 2025– ===
Steuerwald went to Bundesliga newcomer 1. FC Union Berlin in summer 2025.

== International career ==
In 2012, Germany national women's under-15 football team manager Bettina Wiegmann invited Steuerwald to camp.
