= Lisa Karl =

German football player

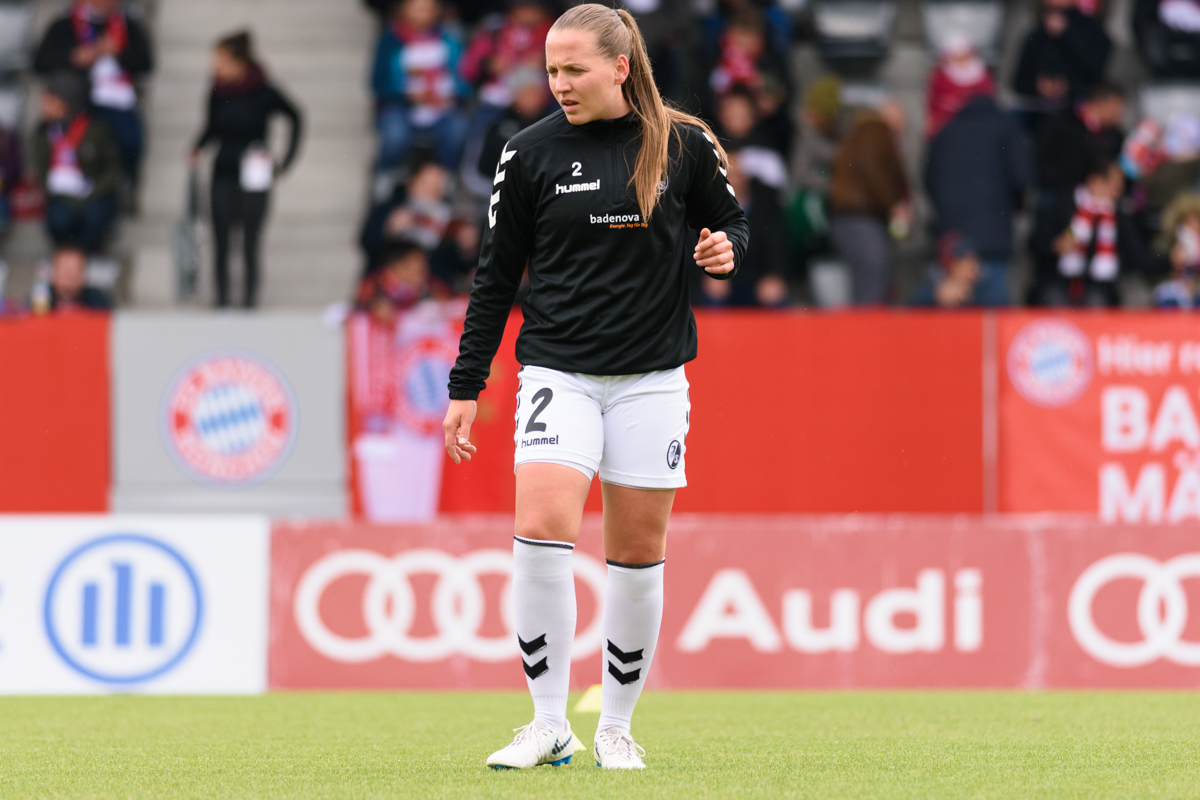

Personal information
- Date of birth: 15 January 1997 (age 29)
- Place of birth: Bad Mergentheim, Germany
- Height: 1.68 m (5 ft 6 in)
- Position: Defender

Team information
- Current team: SC Freiburg
- Number: 2

Youth career
- SV Westernhausen
- –2012: TSV Crailsheim
- 2012–2014: SC Freiburg

Senior career*
Years	Team	Apps	(Gls)
2014–	SC Freiburg	196	(14)
2017–2019	SC Freiburg II	27	(4)

International career
2011–2012	Germany U15	5	(0)
2012–2013	Germany U16	8	(0)
2012–2014	Germany U17	18	(0)
2015–2016	Germany U19	6	(0)
2016	Germany U20	2	(0)
- * Club domestic league appearances and goals as of 22 November 2026

Lisa Karl (born 15 January 1997) is a German footballer who plays as a defender for SC Freiburg.

== Club career ==
Lisa Karl moved from TSV Crailsheim to the U17 team of SC Freiburg Women in 2012, where she played for two years in the U17 Bundesliga. During the 2013-14 season, she was promoted to the senior squad of SC Freiburg Women and made her debut in March 2014 in a 3–0 away defeat against 1. FFC Frankfurt, coming on as a substitute for Juliane Maier in the 75th minute. Shortly afterwards, she suffered an ACL injury at the U17 World Cup and was sidelined for around a year. She made her Bundesliga comeback in March 2015 in a 2–0 away win against FF USV Jena.

She has since become a permanent member of the Bundesliga squad. Since 2020, she has missed only four league matches — and none at all from April 2022 to September 2026. In 2023, she extended her contract until 2027 and reached the cup final with SC Freiburg Women. During the 2023-24 season, she made her 150th competitive appearance for the club. She was also appointed co-captain for the first time alongside Hasret Kayikçi.

In the 2024-25 season, Karl took over the captaincy after Kayikçi suffered an ACL injury. In April 2025, Karl extended her contract once again ahead of schedule. During the 2025 summer training camp, she officially became the team captain, while Laura Benkarth, Julia Stierli and Svenja Fölmli completed the team council. Karl entered her twelfth Bundesliga season in 2025-26. In January 2026, she made her 200th competitive appearance for the Sport-Club.

Since November 2026, she holds the record for the club's most Bundesliga appearances. With over 220 competitive appearances and 14 years in the professional squad, she ranks among Freiburg's record appearance holders.

== Police ==
Lisa Karl is also a senior police officer in Freiburg-Sankt Georgen. In June 2022, she won the European Police Championship in Trondheim with the German national police team alongside Janina Minge. She won the title again in 2025.

== International career ==
Karl has represented Germany at youth level.

== Honours ==
SC Freiburg

- DFB-Pokal Frauen Runners-up: 2019 and 2023

Germany U17

- UEFA Women's Under-17 Championship: 2016
