= Judith Steinert =

German footballer (born 1995)

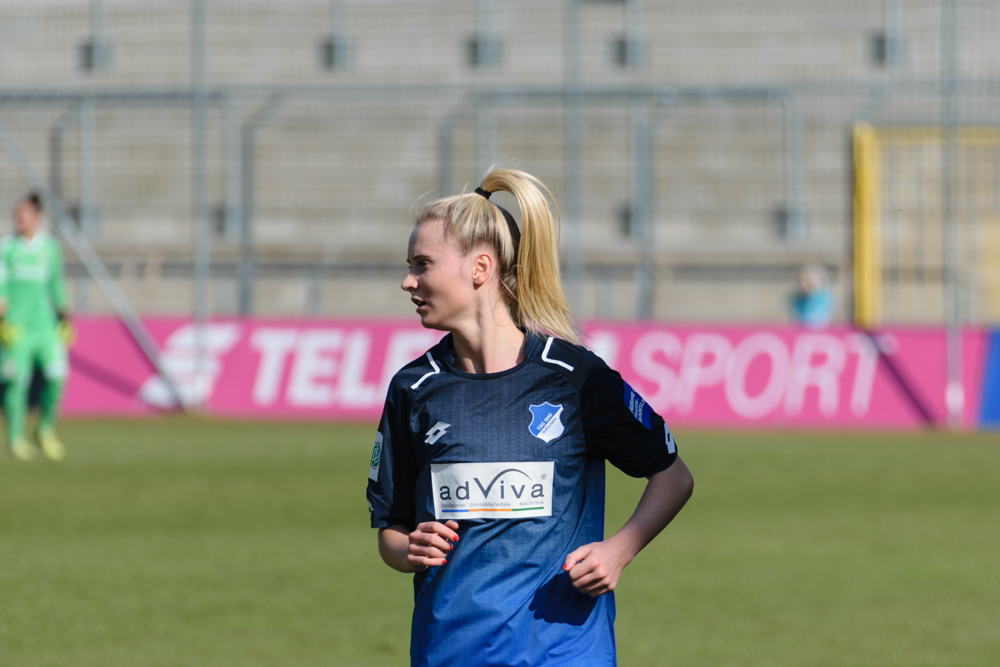
- Steinert in 2018

Personal information
- Date of birth: 25 September 1995 (age 31)
- Place of birth: Mosbach, Germany
- Height: 1.61 m (5 ft 3 in)
- Position: Midfielder

Team information
- Current team: Union Berlin
- Number: 17

Senior career*
Years	Team	Apps	(Gls)
2013–2022	TSG Hoffenheim	109	(5)
2022–2024	SC Freiburg	41	(3)
2024–	Union Berlin	48	(1)

International career
2013	Germany U19	3	(0)
- * Club domestic league appearances and goals as of 21 October 2026

Judith Steinert (born 25 September 1995) is a German footballer who plays as a midfielder for Frauen-Bundesliga club Union Berlin.

Steinert played for Frauen-Bundesliga clubs TSG Hoffenheim and SC Freiburg.
