= Amira Arfaoui =

Swiss footballer (born 1999)

Personal information
- Full name: Amira Arfaoui
- Date of birth: 8 August 1999 (age 27)
- Place of birth: Bern, Switzerland
- Height: 1.60 m (5 ft 3 in)
- Position: Midfielder

Team information
- Current team: SC Freiburg
- Number: 17

Youth career
- BSC YB Frauen

Senior career*
| Years | Team | Apps | (Gls) |
| 2017–2019 | BSC YB Frauen | 1 | (0) |
| 2019–2020 | FC Basel | 17 | (6) |
| 2020–2021 | Servette FC Chênois | 25 | (6) |
| 2021–2023 | Bayer Leverkusen | 50 | (5) |
| 2024 | 1. FC Nürnberg | 7 | (0) |
| 2024–2026 | Werder Bremen | 37 | (2) |
| 2026– | SC Freiburg | 11 | (0) |

International career^{‡}
| 2015 | Switzerland U17 | 4 | (2) |
| 2017 | Switzerland U19 | 3 | (0) |
| 2020– | Switzerland | 3 | (0) |
- * Club domestic league appearances and goals as of 22 November 2026 ‡ National team caps and goals as of 1 March 2026

Amira Arfaoui (born 8 August 1999) is a Swiss footballer who plays as a forward for SC Freiburg and the Switzerland national team.

== Club career ==
Arfaoui started playing football for BSC YB Frauen at the age of 14, having previously tried numerous other sports. As a junior, she won three national titles with YB. She made her Nationalliga A debut at age 15. In the summer of 2019, she moved to FC Basel. In 2020, she joined Servette FC Chênois. At Servette she made two appearances in the Champions League. In July 2021, she acquired number 17 at Bayer Leverkusen, where she signed a two-year contract. On 2 January 2024, she joined 1. FC Nürnberg. In April that year, she sustained a knee injury, which sidelined her for the remainder of the 2023–24 season before the team's relegation.

In April 2026 it was announced Arfaoui would be joining SC Freiburg from league rivals Werder Bremen for the 2026–27 season.

== International career ==
Born in Switzerland, Arfaoui is of Tunisian descent. Her international career began in 2015 when she replaced an injured player in the U17 squad for the European Championship in Iceland. After she scored the goal in the 1–0 semi-final victory over Germany, after the final defeat against Spain, she became vice-European champion with the team. Her first game for the senior team was on 14 January 2020 against the national team of Malta.
