= Alena Bienz =

Swiss association football player

Personal information
- Date of birth: 5 March 2003 (age 23)
- Place of birth: Switzerland
- Position: Midfielder

Team information
- Current team: SC Freiburg
- Number: 8

Senior career*
Years	Team	Apps	(Gls)
2019–2022	FC Luzern	40	(10)
2022–2025	Köln	55	(2)
2025–	SC Freiburg	32	(3)

International career^{‡}
2019	Switzerland U17	3	(5)
2021–2022	Switzerland U19	5	(0)
2024–	Switzerland	7	(0)
- * Club domestic league appearances and goals as of 22 November 2026 ‡ National team caps and goals as of 14 October 2026

Alena Bienz (born 5 March 2003) is a Swiss footballer who plays as a midfielder for SC Freiburg. She previously played for FC Luzern and 1. FC Köln.
