= Heinrich Germer Stadium =

Football stadium in Magdeburg, Germany

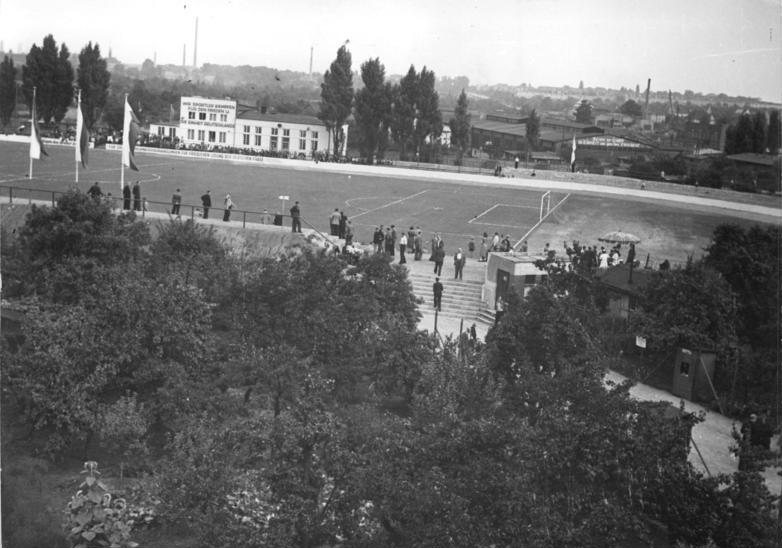
- Interactive map of Heinrich Germer Stadium
- Former names: Stadion am Königsweg
- Location: Magdeburg, Germany
- Coordinates: 52°06′20″N 11°36′03″E
- Owner: City of Magdeburg
- Capacity: 4,990
- Surface: grass
- Record attendance: 22,000

Construction
- Built: 1920
- Opened: 1920
- Renovated: 1951–1952; 2005

Tenants
- Magdeburger SV Preussen; Magdeburger FFC; Magdeburg Virgin Guards

The Heinrich Germer Stadium is a stadium in the Magdeburg quarter of Sudenburg that is mostly used for hosting association football matches. It was built in 1920 and named Stadion am Königsweg. After World War II, the stadium was renovated from 1951 to 1952 and renamed Heinrich-Germer-Stadion, after a local politician. The overall form is that of an oval, with its main stand dominated by the announcer's tower. The stadium currently offers room for 4,990 spectators, with a roof covering about 15 seats and standing room for about 100 spectators. Additionally, there is a 400 meter track surrounding the playing field.

Beginning in the years after the war, the predecessor sides of 1. FC Magdeburg used the stadium — BSG Stahl Magdeburg, Motor Mitte Magdeburg and SC Aufbau Magdeburg. On 22 March 1955 the attendance record of 22,000 was set at a DDR-Liga match between Motor Mitte and Lok Stendal. This attendance was reached several times afterwards.

Because of construction work at the Ernst-Grube-Stadion between May 1979 and May 1981, DDR-Oberliga side 1. FC Magdeburg returned to Heinrich-Germer-Stadion. In this period the stadium hosted several European matches, against Wrexham AFC, Arsenal F.C., Moss FK and Torino Calcio.

In 2005 the stadium was renovated again, as 1. FC Magdeburg returned once more during the construction of the new Stadion Magdeburg. Nowadays, the stadium is used by the soccer teams Magdeburger FFC and MSV Preussen and the American football team the Magdeburg Virgin Guards.
