= Hasret Kayikçi =

German footballer

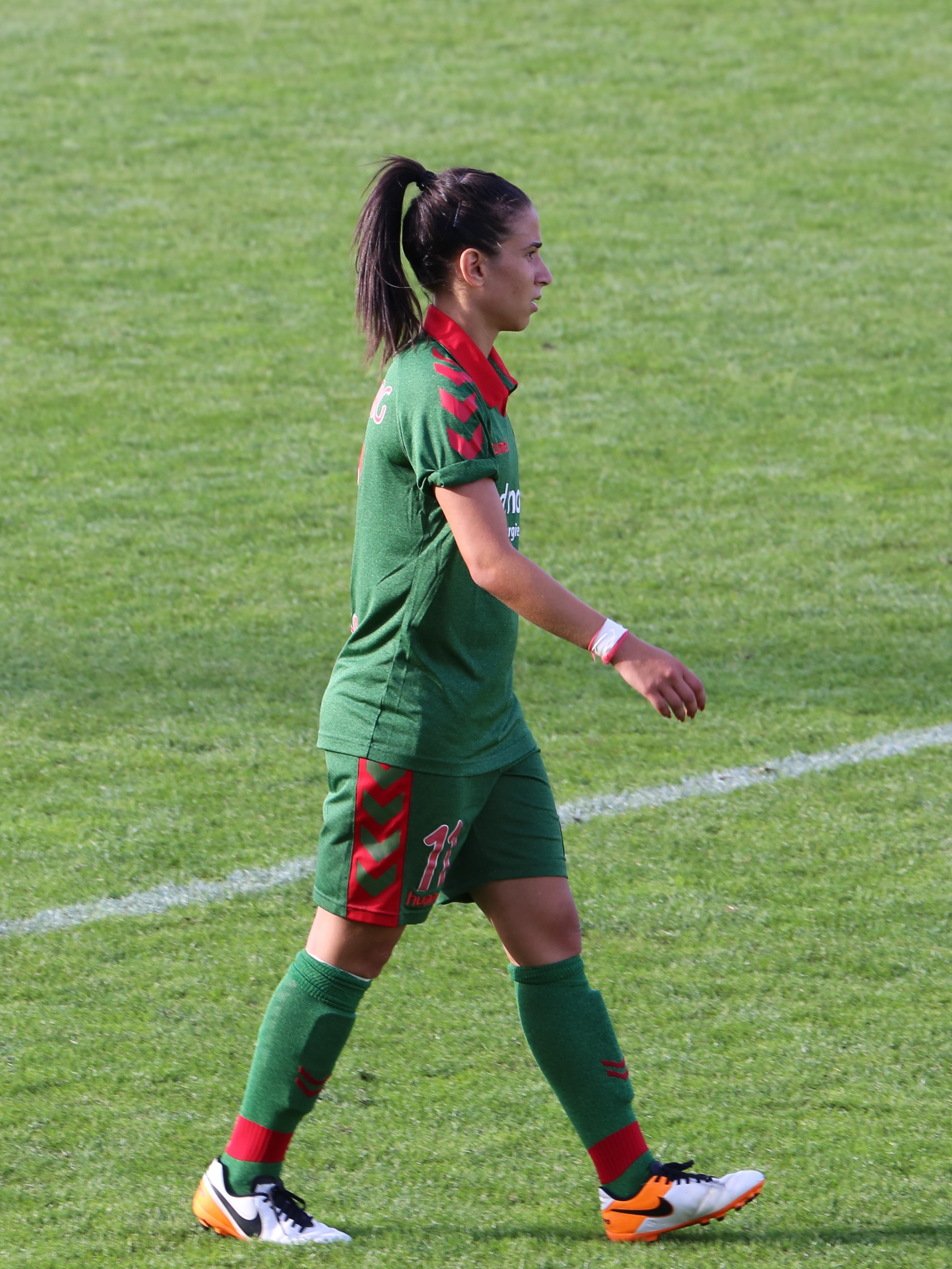
- Kayikçi in 2016

Personal information
- Full name: Hasret Kayikçi
- Date of birth: 6 November 1991 (age 35)
- Place of birth: Heidelberg, Germany
- Height: 1.61 m (5 ft 3 in)
- Position: Striker

Youth career
- 2007–2008: TSG Rohrbach

Senior career*
Years	Team	Apps	(Gls)
2008–2011	FCR 2001 Duisburg	19	(4)
2008–2011	FCR 2001 Duisburg II	16	(11)
2011–2025	SC Freiburg	195	(61)

International career
2008	Germany U17	3	(0)
2009	Germany U19	11	(3)
2016–2018	Germany	11	(6)
- * Club domestic league appearances and goals

Hasret Kayikçi (born 6 November 1991) is a German-Turkish former footballer who played as a striker for SC Freiburg and the Germany national team.

== Club career ==
Kayikçi grew up in Heidelberg-Rohrbach and started her career at TSG Rohrbach. After a year in the federation league team (with 30 goals), she joined as a 16-year-old in the summer of 2008 to Bundesliga team FCR 2001 Duisburg and she debuted on 7 September 2008 against Herforder SV. A week later they scored a 4–3 away win against Hamburger SV; her first Bundesliga goal.

In May 2011, Kayikçi moved to SC Freiburg. In April 2012, she sustained a new cruciate ligament injury, which initially remained undetected. After a long break, she participated in their first Bundesliga game in the 2012–13 season and scored a goal. After three games, Kayikçi was again kept out of action by a knee injury. She could attend a game in the 2013–14 season. After a long pause and rehab, she celebrated her comeback in the Bundesliga at start of the 2014–15 season on 30 August 2014.

Kayikçi became an important player for the club and became team captain in 2021. She was a key player during SC Freiburg Women’s most successful years from 2015 to 2018, when the club finished fourth in the league twice and third once. In the 2016–17 season, she scored twelve goals, setting both a personal best and a club record. In the 2022-23 season, she led her team to the cup final, which was lost to Wolfsburg. In the semi-final she scored 1-0 to advance.

In January 2025, Kayikçi announced she would retire at the end of the 2024–25 season after suffering another cruciate ligament injury in August 2024. She celebrated her comeback in the last game of the season in May 2025, being the last game in her career.

Kayikçi is Freiburg's all-time Bundesliga top goalscorer. From February 2024 to November 2026, she held the record for the club's most Bundesliga appearances. With 225 competitive appearances and 14 years in the professional squad, she ranks among Freiburg's record appearance holders.

== Management ==
In the summer of 2025, she continued her career at the Sport-Club in the management and scouting department. In addition, she is an advisor to department head Birgit Bauer-Schick.

== International career ==
Kayikçi adopted German citizenship and was part of the squad of the U-17 national team for the World Cup in New Zealand. She also belonged to the squad of the U-19 national team for the European Championship in Macedonia. She suffered a cruciate ligament injury in the final group game.

She was part of the German squad for the UEFA Women's Euro 2017 and took part in the SheBelieves Cup twice.

== Career statistics ==
Scores and results list Germany's goal tally first, score column indicates score after each Kayikçi goal.

List of international goals scored by Hasret Kayikçi
No.	Date	Venue	Opponent	Score	Result	Competition
1	4 July 2017	Sandhausen, Germany	Brazil	2–1	3–1	Friendly
2	24 October 2017	Großaspach, Germany	Faroe Islands	8–0	11–0	2019 FIFA World Cup qualifying
3	24 October 2017	Großaspach, Germany	Faroe Islands	9–0	11–0	2019 FIFA World Cup qualifying
4	24 October 2017	Großaspach, Germany	Faroe Islands	10–0	11–0	2019 FIFA World Cup qualifying
5	24 October 2017	Großaspach, Germany	Faroe Islands	11–0	11–0	2019 FIFA World Cup qualifying
6	4 March 2018	Harrison, United States	England	1–0	2–2	Friendly

== Honours ==
FCR 2001 Duisburg

- UEFA Women's Champions League: 2008–09
- DFB-Pokal: 2008–09, 2009–10
