= Rostocker FC =

- Full name: Rostocker Fußballclub von 1895 e. V.
- Founded: 1895
- Ground: Sportpark am Damerower Weg
- Capacity: 3,000
- League: NOFV-Oberliga Nord
- 2023–24: 14th
- Website: https://www.rfc-1895.de/

Rostocker Fußballclub von 1895 e. V. is a German football club from Rostock, Mecklenburg-Vorpommern. Founded in 1895, the club plays in the NOFV-Oberliga Nord in the fifth tier of the German football league system.

== History ==
The club was founded in 1895. The club has had several names; as TSG Bau Rostock it competed in the DDR-Liga, the second division of East German football, from 1973 to 1986. In 1978–79, it won its group, but came last in the play-off group for promotion to the DDR-Oberliga.

Rostocker FC won the Mecklenburg-Vorpommern Cup for the first time in 2023, defeating FSV Einheit Ueckermünde in the final. This qualified the team for the first time to the DFB-Pokal, where they were drawn for the first round at home to newly promoted Bundesliga side 1. FC Heidenheim, with the game at FC Hansa Rostock's Ostseestadion; they lost 8–0.
