= 2021–22 Frauen-Bundesliga =

Frauen-Bundesliga
- Season: 2021–22
- Dates: 27 August 2021 – 15 May 2022
- Champions: VfL Wolfsburg
- Relegated: SC Sand; Carl Zeiss Jena
- Champions League: VfL Wolfsburg; Bayern Munich; Eintracht Frankfurt
- Matches: 132
- Goals: 459 (3.48 per match)
- Top goalscorer: Lea Schüller (16 goals)
- Biggest home win: Munich 8–0 Bremen
- Biggest away win: Jena 1–10 Wolfsburg
- Highest scoring: Jena 1–10 Wolfsburg
- Longest winning run: 5 games Munich
- Longest unbeaten run: 6 games Wolfsburg
- Longest winless run: 13 games Jena; Sand
- Longest losing run: 8 games Jena
- Attendance: 106,174 (804 per match) (Note: Due to the COVID-19 pandemic in Germany, each local health department allows a different number of spectators.)

The 2021–22 season of the Frauen-Bundesliga was the 32nd season of Germany's premier women's football league. It ran from 27 August 2021 to 15 May 2022.

The fixtures were announced on 6 July 2021.

== Teams ==
Locations of teams in the 2021–22 Frauen-Bundesliga

=== Team changes ===
Promoted from 2020–21 2. Bundesliga	Relegated from 2020–21 Bundesliga
1. FC Köln; Carl Zeiss Jena	SV Meppen; MSV Duisburg

=== Stadiums ===
Team	Home city	Home ground	Capacity
Werder Bremen	Bremen	Weserstadion Platz 11	5,500
SGS Essen	Essen	Stadion Essen	20,650
Eintracht Frankfurt	Frankfurt	Stadion am Brentanobad	5,650
SC Freiburg	Freiburg	Dreisamstadion	24,000
1899 Hoffenheim	Hoffenheim	Dietmar-Hopp-Stadion	6,350
Carl Zeiss Jena	Jena	Ernst-Abbe-Sportfeld	10,445
1. FC Köln	Cologne	Franz-Kremer-Stadion	5,457
Bayer Leverkusen	Leverkusen	Ulrich-Haberland-Stadion	3,200
Bayern Munich	Munich	FC Bayern Campus	2,500
Turbine Potsdam	Potsdam	Karl-Liebknecht-Stadion	10,787
SC Sand	Willstätt	Kühnmatt Stadion	2,000
VfL Wolfsburg	Wolfsburg	AOK Stadium	5,200

== League table ==
Pos	Team	Pld	W	D	L	GF	GA	GD	Pts	Qualification or relegation
1	VfL Wolfsburg (C)	22	19	2	1	82	16	+66	59	Qualification for Champions League group stage
2	Bayern Munich	22	18	1	3	78	18	+60	55	Qualification for Champions League second round
3	Eintracht Frankfurt	22	15	1	6	49	26	+23	46	Qualification for Champions League first round
4	Turbine Potsdam	22	13	4	5	52	29	+23	43	
5	1899 Hoffenheim	22	12	5	5	56	32	+24	41	
6	SC Freiburg	22	9	5	8	40	31	+9	32	
7	Bayer Leverkusen	22	6	4	12	31	50	−19	22	
8	1. FC Köln	22	5	7	10	22	45	−23	22	
9	Werder Bremen	22	4	6	12	9	46	−37	18	
10	SGS Essen	22	4	5	13	23	41	−18	17	
11	SC Sand (R)	22	3	4	15	16	45	−29	13	Relegation to 2. Bundesliga
12	Carl Zeiss Jena (R)	22	1	2	19	9	88	−79	5	Relegation to 2. Bundesliga

Source: DFB
Rules for classification: 1) Points; 2) Goal difference; 3) Goals scored; 4) Head-to-head points; 5) Head-to-head goal difference; 6) Head-to-head goals scored; 7) Head-to-head away goals scored; 8) Away goals scored; 9) Play-off.
(C) Champions; (R) Relegated

== Results ==
Home \ Away	BRE	ESS	FRA	FRE	HOF	JEN	KÖL	LEV	MUN	POT	SAN	WOL
Werder Bremen	—	1–0	1–0	0–0	0–1	0–2	0–0	0–3	0–2	0–5	1–0	0–2
SGS Essen	0–0	—	0–2	0–1	0–0	3–0	1–1	1–1	1–2	0–5	4–1	1–5
Eintracht Frankfurt	4–0	1–0	—	1–2	3–2	6–0	4–0	2–1	3–2	3–3	2–1	1–4
SC Freiburg	1–0	3–0	0–1	—	1–3	7–1	2–2	1–2	0–3	0–0	7–1	2–2
1899 Hoffenheim	7–1	2–1	2–1	2–1	—	6–0	1–1	7–1	2–4	1–2	3–3	2–1
Carl Zeiss Jena	1–1	0–4	0–4	1–5	1–5	—	1–3	0–3	0–4	0–6	1–4	1–10
1. FC Köln	1–1	2–1	1–2	0–0	1–2	2–0	—	1–1	0–6	1–3	1–0	1–5
Bayer Leverkusen	1–1	1–2	0–1	2–3	0–3	2–0	3–4	—	0–3	2–0	2–0	1–1
Bayern Munich	8–0	4–0	4–2	4–0	3–1	3–0	6–0	7–1	—	5–0	4–0	0–1
Turbine Potsdam	5–0	3–2	0–2	2–1	3–3	5–0	2–0	4–2	1–1	—	2–0	0–3
SC Sand	0–1	1–1	0–2	0–2	1–1	0–0	1–0	2–1	0–3	0–1	—	1–2
VfL Wolfsburg	3–1	5–1	3–2	4–1	3–0	5–0	3–0	7–1	6–0	3–0	4–0	—

Source: DFB
Legend: Blue = home team win; Yellow = draw; Red = away team win.

== Top scorers ==
Rank	Player	Club	Goals
1	(Germany) Lea Schüller	Bayern Munich	16
2	(Germany) Selina Cerci	Turbine Potsdam	13
2	(Germany) Tabea Waßmuth	VfL Wolfsburg	13
4	(Austria) Nicole Billa	1899 Hoffenheim	12
4	(Germany) Laura Freigang	Eintracht Frankfurt	12
4	(Germany) Chantal Hagel	1899 Hoffenheim	12
7	(Germany) Hasret Kayikçi	SC Freiburg	11
7	(Slovenia) Lara Prašnikar	Eintracht Frankfurt	11
9	(Germany) Melissa Kössler	Turbine Potsdam	10
9	(Germany) Maximiliane Rall	Bayern Munich	10
9	(Netherlands) Jill Roord	VfL Wolfsburg	10
