= SC Freiburg (women) =

Women's football team of the German sports club

SC Freiburg Frauen & Mädchen
- Full name: Sport-Club Freiburg
- Nicknames: Der Sport-Club, SC
- Founded: 1975; 51 years ago
- Ground: Dreisamstadion; Freiburg, Germany
- Capacity: 24,000
- Sporting director: Birgit Bauer-Schick
- Head coach: Marco Konrad
- League: Bundesliga
- 2025–26: Bundesliga, 8th of 14
- Website: scfreiburg.com
Home colours	Away colours	Third colours

Sport-Club Freiburg Frauen & Mädchen is a German women's association football team based in Freiburg. The team currently play in the top-flight Frauen-Bundesliga. The team was founded in 1975 as a department of SC Freiburg, which was itself established in 1904. The team was abolished again in 1985 and refounded in 1991.

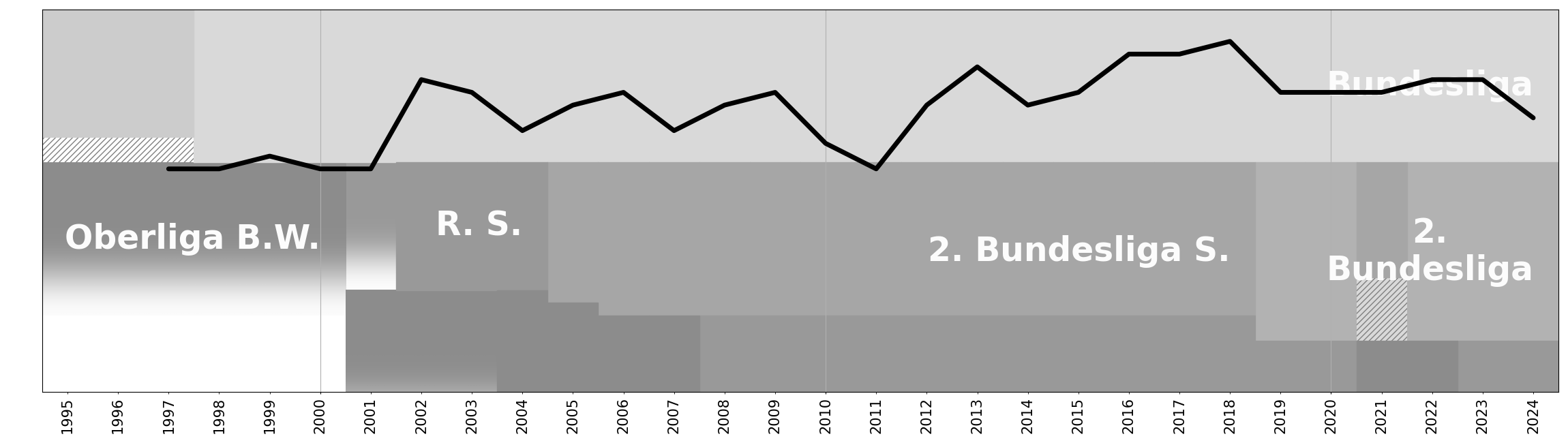
Historical league performance of SC Freiburg

The club reached the Bundesliga for the first time in 1998, but were relegated just the year after.

== Players ==
=== Current squad ===
As of 1 August 2026

Note: Flags indicate national team as defined under FIFA eligibility rules; some limited exceptions apply. Players may hold more than one non-FIFA nationality.

No.	Pos.	Nation	Player
1	GK	GER	Laura Benkarth
2	DF	GER	Lisa Karl (captain)
3	DF	GER	Alina Axtmann
4	MF	GER	Meret Felde
5	DF	SUI	Julia Stierli
6	MF	AUT	Nicole Ojukwu
7	MF	GER	Tessa Blumenberg
8	MF	SUI	Alena Bienz
9	MF	MAR	Sabah Seghir
10	MF	GER	Selina Vobian
13	FW	GER	Nora Scherer
14	FW	AUT	Carina Brunold
15	MF	GER	Maj Schneider
16	MF	GER	Johanna Hebben
17	FW	SUI	Amira Arfaoui

No.	Pos.	Nation	Player
18	DF	GER	Mia-Lena Maas
19	DF	GER	Nia Szenk
20	DF	SVK	Jana Vojteková
21	GK	GER	Lina von Schrader
22	FW	AUT	Lisa Kolb
23	FW	GER	Luca Birkholz
24	DF	ISL	Ingibjörg Sigurðardóttir
25	MF	GER	Weena Simmen
27	DF	GER	Zoe Schick
29	FW	HUN	Borbála Vincze
30	MF	GER	İlayda Açıkgöz
32	DF	GER	Emma Memminger
33	GK	SUI	Lorena Barth
38	GK	GER	Anna Reimann

== Club staff ==
Position	Name
Manager	(Germany) Marco Konrad
Assistant manager	(Germany) Sandrino Braun-Schumacher (Germany) Sebastian Grunert
Goalkeeping coach	(Germany) Dominik Bergdorf
Athletic coach	(Germany) Tobias Galli
Head of department	(Germany) Birgit Bauer-Schick
Athletic director	(Germany) André Malinowski
Team Manager	(Germany) Annika Miller
Team Supervisor	(Germany) Silke Heckel
Team Doctor	(Germany) Dr. Lisa Bode
Head of physiotherapy and athletics	(Germany) Carolin Schneider
Data Analyst	(Germany) Daniel Streif
Physiotherapist	(Germany) Nils Afflerbach
Press spokesman and media officer for women's football	(Germany) Niklas Batsch
