= 2026–27 FC Bayern Munich (women) season =

German women's football club season

Bayern Munich (women)
2026–27 season
- President: Herbert Hainer
- Head coach: José Barcala
- Stadium: FC Bayern Campus; Sportpark Unterhaching (select games)
- Bundesliga: 1st
- DFB-Pokal: Quarter-finals
- DFB-Supercup: Winners
- UEFA Champions League: League phase
- Top goalscorer: League: Klara Bühl; Edna Imade (6 each); All: Klara Bühl (11)
Home colours	Away colours	Third colours

The 2026–27 FC Bayern Munich Frauen season is the club's 27th consecutive season in the Bundesliga. In addition to competing in the DFB-Pokal, the club is also competing in the 2026 DFB-Supercup Frauen and the UEFA Women's Champions League.

== Season summary ==
On 20 May 2026, the club announced it would be spending its first friendly competition tour in Tokyo, Japan. This would be the first time the club would tour in Asia.

== Squad ==
=== First-team squad ===
As of 24 August 2026

Note: Flags indicate national team as defined under FIFA eligibility rules; some limited exceptions apply. Players may hold more than one non-FIFA nationality.

No.	Pos.	Nation	Player
1	GK	GER	Ena Mahmutovic
2	DF	CAN	Vanessa Gilles
3	DF	DEN	Stine Ballisager
4	DF	ISL	Glódís Perla Viggósdóttir (captain)
5	DF	SWE	Magdalena Eriksson
6	FW	GER	Kassandra Potsi
7	DF	GER	Giulia Gwinn
8	MF	GER	Lena Oberdorf
9	FW	SRB	Jovana Damnjanović
10	MF	GER	Linda Dallmann
11	DF	GER	Sarah Mattner-Trembleau
14	MF	GER	Alara Şehitler

No.	Pos.	Nation	Player
15	MF	CIV	Bernadette Amani
17	FW	GER	Klara Bühl
18	MF	JPN	Momoko Tanikawa
19	DF	AUT	Katharina Naschenweng
20	DF	GER	Franziska Kett
21	FW	DEN	Pernille Harder
22	GK	NED	Regina van Eijk
23	FW	NED	Sophie Proost
25	MF	AUT	Sarah Zadrazil (vice-captain)
28	MF	AUT	Barbara Dunst
29	FW	ESP	Edna Imade
38	GK	GER	Anna Klink

=== Contract renewals ===
No.	Pos.	Nat.	Name	Date	Until	Ref.
1	GK	(Germany)	Ena Mahmutovic	24 September 2026	30 June 2029	

== Transfers and loans ==
=== Transfers in ===
Pos	Player	From club	Fee	Date	Source
FW	(Colombia) Ana María Guzmán	(Brazil) Palmeiras	Loan return	30 June 2026	
FW	(Germany) Kassandra Potsi	(Germany) SGS Essen	Undisclosed	1 July 2026	
GK	(Netherlands) Regina van Eijk	(Netherlands) Ajax	Undisclosed	1 July 2026	
FW	(Germany) Sarah Mattner-Trembleau	(Austria) SKN St. Pölten	Undisclosed	1 July 2026	
GK	(Germany) Anna Wellmann	(Portugal) Sporting CP	Undisclosed	1 July 2026	
FW	(Netherlands) Sophie Proost	(Netherlands) Twente	Undisclosed	8 July 2026	

=== Transfers out ===
Pos	Player	To club	Fee	Date	Source
GK	(Germany) Maria Luisa Grohs	(France) OL Lyonnes	End of contract	30 June 2026	
DF	(Germany) Carolin Simon	(Germany) Bayer Leverkusen	End of contract	30 June 2026	
MF	(England) Georgia Stanway	(England) Arsenal	End of contract	30 June 2026	
FW	(Poland) Natalia Padilla	(Spain) UD Tenerife	End of contract	30 June 2026	
FW	(Colombia) Ana María Guzmán	(Brazil) Palmeiras	Undisclosed	1 July 2026	
MF	(Italy) Arianna Caruso	(Spain) Real Madrid	Undisclosed	24 August 2026	

=== Loans out ===
Pos	Player	To club	Date	Until	Source
GK	(Germany) Anna Wellmann	(Spain) Eibar	1 July 2026	30 June 2027	
DF	(Germany) Luzie Zähringer	(Germany) VfB Stuttgart	1 July 2026	30 June 2027	
MF	(Germany) Marie Gmeineder	(Germany) Werder Bremen	1 July 2026	30 June 2027	

== Pre-season and friendlies ==
25 July 2026 Friendly	RB Omiya Ardija Women	1–4	Bayern Munich	Saitama (city), Japan
17:00 JST (10:00 CEST)	Munakta 73'	Report	Harder 16'; Damnjanović 45+3'; Naschenweng 57'; Alara 90+3' (pen.)	Stadium: NACK5 Stadium Omiya; Attendance: 6,506; Referee: Kotomi Omura

1 August 2026 Friendly	Bayern Munich	2–2	1. FC Nürnberg	Donauwörth, Germany
17:00 CEST (UTC+2)	Dallmann 10'; Harder 65'	Report	Lein 8'; Meroni 48'	Stadium: Stauferpark-Stadion; Attendance: 2,700; Referee: Iris Spitaler

9 August 2026 Friendly	Bayern Munich	2–0	Paris FC	Unterhaching, Germany
16:00 CEST (UTC+2)	Harder 13'; Alara 35'	Report		Stadium: Sportpark Unterhaching; Attendance: 6,000; Referee: Marina Bachmann

== Competitions ==
=== Overview ===
Competition	First match	Last match	Starting round	Final position	Record							
Competition	First match	Last match	Starting round	Final position	Pld	W	D	L	GF	GA	GD	Win %
Bundesliga	21 August 2026	23 May 2027	Matchday 1		10	10	0	0	36	9	+27	100.00
DFB-Pokal	27 September 2026		First round		2	2	0	0	3	1	+2	100.00
DFB-Supercup	15 August 2026		Final	Winners	1	1	0	0	3	0	+3	100.00
UEFA Champions League	22 September 2026		League phase		5	3	2	0	13	5	+8	60.00
Total					18	16	2	0	55	15	+40	88.89

Last updated: 19 November 2026
Source: Competitions

=== DFB-Supercup ===
15 August 2026	Bayern Munich	3–0	VfL Wolfsburg	Audi Sportpark, Ingolstadt
19:30 CEST (UTC+2)	Damnjanović 32'; Bühl 45+4', 46'	Report		Attendance: 8,689; Referee: Angelika Söder

=== Bundesliga ===
==== League table ====
Pos	Team	Pld	W	D	L	GF	GA	GD	Pts	Qualification or relegation
1	Bayern Munich	10	10	0	0	36	9	+27	30	Qualification for the Champions League league phase
2	VfL Wolfsburg	10	8	0	2	30	13	+17	24	Qualification for the Champions League third qualifying round
3	Eintracht Frankfurt	11	7	2	2	23	11	+12	23	Qualification for the Champions League second qualifying round
4	Bayer Leverkusen	11	7	1	3	21	14	+7	22	
5	Werder Bremen	11	6	2	3	22	16	+6	20	

Updated to match(es) played on 22 November 2026. Source: DFB
Rules for classification: 1) Points; 2) Goal difference; 3) Goals scored; 4) Head-to-head results; 5) Head-to-head away goals scored; 6) Away goals scored; 7) Play-off.

==== Results summary ====
Overall								Home						Away					
Pld	W	D	L	GF	GA	GD	Pts	W	D	L	GF	GA	GD	W	D	L	GF	GA	GD
10	10	0	0	36	9	+27	30	5	0	0	19	4	+15	5	0	0	17	5	+12

Last updated: 14 November 2026.
Source: DFB

==== Results by matchday ====
Matchday	1	2	3	4	5	6	7	8	9	10	11	12	13	14	15	16	17	18	19	20	21	22	23	24	25	26
Ground	A	H	H	A	H	A	H	A	H	A	H	H	A	H	A	A	H	A	H	A	H	A	H	A	A	H
Result	W	W	W	W	W	W	W	W	W	W																
Position	2	2	2	2	1	1	1	1	1	1																
Points	3	6	9	12	15	18	21	24	27	30																

Updated to match(es) played on 14 November 2026. Source: DFB
A = Away; H = Home; W = Win; D = Draw; L = Loss; P = Postponed

==== Matches ====
21 August 2026 1	Union Berlin	1–4	Bayern Munich	Berlin
18:20 CEST (UTC+2)	Egli (yellow card) 73'; Bauereisen 79'	Report	Damnjanović (yellow card) 23'; Bühl 26'; Harder 47'; Viggósdóttir 60'; Proost 90'	Stadium: Stadion An der Alten Försterei; Attendance: 17,033; Referee: Miriam Schwermer

31 August 2026 2	Bayern Munich	2–0	Mainz 05	Munich
18:00 CEST (UTC+2)	Gwinn 38'; Gilles 90+1'	Report		Stadium: FC Bayern Campus; Attendance: 2,500; Referee: Angelika Söder

6 September 2026 3	Bayern Munich	4–1	SC Freiburg	Munich
16:00 CEST (UTC+2)	Tanikawa 18', 90+1', (yellow card) 79'; Gilles 42'; Amani (yellow card) 75'; Bühl 76'	Report	Ojukwu (yellow card) 10'; Birkholz 64'; Açıkgöz (yellow card) 77'; Karl (yellow card) 89'	Stadium: FC Bayern Campus; Attendance: 2,500; Referee: Fabienne Michel

14 September 2026 4	Bayer Leverkusen	2–3	Bayern Munich	Leverkusen
18:00 CEST (UTC+2)	Tomasiak 36', 52'; Gonzalez (yellow card) 69'	Report	Tanikawa (yellow card) 35'; Gilles 51'; Amani (yellow card) 60'; Imade 68'; Proost (yellow card) 81'; Alara 88'	Stadium: Ulrich-Haberland-Stadion; Attendance: 2,272; Referee: Anna-Lena Heidenreich

19 September 2026 5	Bayern Munich	5–2	1. FC Köln	Munich
14:00 CEST (UTC+2)	Damnjanović 4'; Imade 9', 15'; Alara 65' (pen.); Zadrazil 68'	Report	Jessen (yellow card) 23'; Elsen 45+2'; Sterner 57'; Hegering (yellow card) 81'; Vogt (yellow card) 85'	Stadium: FC Bayern Campus; Attendance: 2,500; Referee: Selina Menzel

3 October 2026 6	Eintracht Frankfurt	0–1	Bayern Munich	Frankfurt
17:55 CEST (UTC+2)	Østenstad (yellow card) 51'	Report	Bühl 18'; Dunst (yellow card) 90+4'	Stadium: Stadion am Brentanobad; Attendance: 5,750; Referee: Davina Lutz

19 October 2026 7	Bayern Munich	5–0	VfB Stuttgart	Munich
18:00 CEST (UTC+2)	Dallmann 14'; Harder 16', 59'; Bühl 49'; Imade 89'	Report		Stadium: FC Bayern Campus; Attendance: 2,500; Referee: Nadine Westerhoff

23 October 2026 8	RB Leipzig	1–5	Bayern Munich	Leipzig
18:30 CEST (UTC+2)	Ásgeirsdóttir (yellow card) 54'; Mertens (yellow card) 61'; Schimmer 78'; Dudek (yellow card) 88'	Report	Tanikawa 8'; Mertens 14' (o.g.); Bühl 55', 73'; Mahmutovic (red card) 75'; Imade 85'	Stadium: RB-Trainingzentrum, Platz 1 Attendance: 2,015; Referee: Levke Scholz

6 November 2026 9	Bayern Munich	3–1	Werder Bremen	Munich
18:30 CET (UTC+1)	Imade 22', (yellow card) 57'; Harder (yellow card) 36'; Gilles (yellow card) 60'; Dallmann 84'; Damnjanović 87'	Report	Weiß (yellow card) 31'; Dhont 50'; Shimada (yellow card) 81'; Ulbrich (yellow card) 88'	Stadium: FC Bayern Campus; Attendance: 2,500; Referee: Karoline Wacker

14 November 2026 10	VfL Wolfsburg	1–4	Bayern Munich	Wolfsburg
17:55 CET (UTC+1)	Fløe 90+2'	Report	Amani 36', 81', (yellow card) 51'; Dallmann 45+2'; Minge 57' (o.g.); Naschenweng (yellow card) 79'; Imade (yellow card) 87'	Stadium: Volkswagen Arena; Attendance: 9,015; Referee: Franziska Wildfeuer

23 November 2026 11	Bayern Munich	v	TSG Hoffenheim	Munich
18:00 CET (UTC+1)		Report		Stadium: FC Bayern Campus

11 December 2026 12	Bayern Munich	v	1. FC Nürnberg	Munich
18:30 CET (UTC+1)		Report		Stadium: FC Bayern Campus

20 December 2026 13	Hamburger SV	v	Bayern Munich	Hamburg
16:00 CET (UTC+1)		Report		Stadium: Volksparkstadion

17 January 2027 14	Bayern Munich	v	Union Berlin	Munich
16:00 CET (UTC+1)		Report		Stadium: FC Bayern Campus

22 January 2027 15	Mainz 05	v	Bayern Munich	Mainz
18:30 CET (UTC+1)		Report		Stadium: Bruchwegstadion

29 January–1 February 2027 16	SC Freiburg	v	Bayern Munich	Freiburg
		Report		Stadium: Dreisamstadion

5–8 February 2027 17	Bayern Munich	v	Bayer Leverkusen	Munich
		Report		Stadium: FC Bayern Campus

12–15 February 2027 18	1. FC Köln	v	Bayern Munich	Cologne
		Report		Stadium: Franz-Kremer-Stadion

19–22 February 2027 19	Bayern Munich	v	Eintracht Frankfurt	Munich
		Report		Stadium: FC Bayern Campus

12–15 March 2027 20	VfB Stuttgart	v	Bayern Munich	Stuttgart
		Report		Stadium: Gazi-Stadion auf der Waldau

19–22 March 2027 21	Bayern Munich	v	RB Leipzig	Munich
		Report		Stadium: FC Bayern Campus

27–29 March 2027 22	Werder Bremen	v	Bayern Munich	Bremen
		Report		Stadium: Weserstadion Platz 11

9–12 April 2027 23	Bayern Munich	v	VfL Wolfsburg	Munich
		Report		Stadium: FC Bayern Campus

30 April–3 May 2027 24	TSG Hoffenheim	v	Bayern Munich	Sinsheim
		Report		Stadium: Dietmar-Hopp-Stadion

7–10 May 2027 25	1. FC Nürnberg	v	Bayern Munich	Nuremberg
		Report		Stadium: Max-Morlock-Stadion

23 May 2027 26	Bayern Munich	v	Hamburger SV	Munich
		Report		Stadium: FC Bayern Campus

=== DFB-Pokal ===
27 September 2026 First round	Borussia Mönchengladbach	1–2	Bayern Munich	Mönchengladbach
15:00 CEST (UTC+2)	Graf (yellow card) 10' (goal) 45+2'; Deyß (yellow card) 34'; Palmen (yellow card) 81'	Report	Naschenweng (yellow card) 14'; Damnjanović (yellow card) 30'; Gilles 74', 80'	Stadium: Borussia-Park; Attendance: 6,608; Referee: Julia Boike

1 November 2026 Round of 16	Bayern Munich	1–0	Bayer Leverkusen	München
15:00 CET (UTC+1)	Harder 73' (pen.); Amani (yellow card) 78'	Report	Müller (yellow card) 34'	Stadium: FC Bayern Campus; Attendance: 2,300; Referee: Miriam Schwermer

=== UEFA Champions League ===
As champions of the 2025–26 Frauen-Bundesliga, Bayern Munich entered this season's competition at the league phase.

==== League phase ====
===== League phase table =====
Pos	Team	Pld	W	D	L	GF	GA	GD	Pts	Qualification
1	(Royal Spanish Football Federation) Barcelona (Q)	5	4	1	0	26	3	+23	13	Advance to the quarter-finals (seeded)
2	(French Football Federation) OL Lyonnes (Q)	5	4	1	0	22	0	+22	13	Advance to the quarter-finals (seeded)
3	(German Football Association) Bayern Munich (T)	5	3	2	0	13	5	+8	11	Advance to the quarter-finals (seeded)
4	(The Football Association) Chelsea (T)	5	3	2	0	4	0	+4	11	Advance to the quarter-finals (seeded)
5	(The Football Association) Manchester City (T)	5	2	3	0	10	5	+5	9 (Note: Ranked based on away goals scored, Manchester City 8, Real Madrid 3)	Advance to the knockout phase play-offs (seeded)

Updated to match(es) played on 19 November 2026. Source: UEFA
Rules for classification: League phase tiebreakers
(Q) Qualified for the phase indicated; (T) Qualified, but not yet for the particular phase indicated

===== Matches =====
22 September 2026 1	Bayern Munich (Germany)	2–2	(England) Manchester City	Unterhaching
18:45 CEST (UTC+2)	Gwinn 11'; Casparij 28' (o.g.); Amani (yellow card) 70'	Report	Mead 45'; Casparij (yellow card) 53'; Wamser 86'	Stadium: Sportpark Unterhaching; Attendance: 4,291; Referee: Olatz Rivera Olmedo (Spain)

30 September 2026 2	Benfica (Portugal)	0–3	(Germany) Bayern Munich	Lisbon
21:00 CEST (UTC+2)	Testen (yellow card) 1'	Report	Dallmann (yellow card) 61'; Bühl 74'; Harder 80'; Kett 88'	Stadium: Estádio da Luz; Attendance: 6,406; Referee: Maria Sole Ferrieri Caputi (Italy)

28 October 2026 3	Bayern Munich (Germany)	2–2	(Spain) Real Madrid	Unterhaching
18:45 CET (UTC+1)	Imade 30'; Tanikawa 52'; Eriksson (yellow card) 84'; Amani (yellow card) 85'	Report	Athenea 7'; Beerensteyn 22'; Angeldal (yellow card) 28'; Däbritz (yellow card) 90'	Stadium: Sportpark Unterhaching; Attendance: 6,239; Referee: Eleni Antoniou (Greece)

10 November 2026 4	Paris Saint-Germain (France)	1–2	(Germany) Bayern Munich	Paris
21:00 CET (UTC+1)	Lafontaine (yellow card) 25'; Dudek 65' (pen.)	Report	Dallmann (yellow card) 35'; Kiedrzynek 29' (o.g.); Bühl 40'; Kett (yellow card) 88'; Amani (yellow card) 90+6'	Stadium: Parc des Princes; Attendance: 8,556; Referee: Frida Klarlund (Denmark)

19 November 2026 5	Austria Wien	0–4	(Germany) Bayern Munich	Vienna
18:45 CET (UTC+1)	Schiechtl (yellow card) 51'; Wenninger (yellow card) 64'; Pfattner (yellow card) 69'; Weilharter (yellow card) 90+1'	Report	Bühl 27'; Harder 45+1'; Alara 75'; Proost 90+3'	Stadium: Franz Horr Stadium; Attendance: 9,124; Referee: Kirsty Dowle (England)

16 December 2026 6	Bayern Munich (Germany)	v	(Spain) Barcelona	Unterhaching
21:00 CET (UTC+1)		Report		Stadium: Sportpark Unterhaching

== Statistics ==
=== Appearances and goals ===
As of 19 November 2026

Starting appearances are listed first, followed by substitute appearances after the + symbol where applicable.

No.	Pos	Nat	Player	Total		Bundesliga		DFB-Pokal		DFB-Supercup		Champions League	
No.	Pos	Nat	Player	Apps	Goals	Apps	Goals	Apps	Goals	Apps	Goals	Apps	Goals
Goalkeepers
1	GK	(Germany) GER	Ena Mahmutovic	16	0	9	0	1	0	1	0	5	0
22	GK	(Netherlands) NED	Regina van Eijk	2	0	1	0	1	0	0	0	0	0
38	GK	(Germany) GER	Anna Klink	0	0	0	0	0	0	0	0	0	0
Defenders
2	DF	(Canada) CAN	Vanessa Gilles	9	5	4+2	3	1	2	0	0	2	0
3	DF	(Denmark) DEN	Stine Ballisager	12	0	5	0	1+1	0	1	0	3+1	0
4	DF	(Iceland) ISL	Glódís Perla Viggósdóttir	13	1	8	1	0	0	1	0	4	0
5	DF	(Sweden) SWE	Magdalena Eriksson	11	0	4+2	0	1	0	1	0	2+1	0
7	DF	(Germany) GER	Giulia Gwinn	11	2	5+1	1	0+1	0	0	0	4	1
11	DF	(Germany) GER	Sarah Mattner-Trembleau	11	0	3+5	0	2	0	0	0	0+1	0
19	DF	(Austria) AUT	Katharina Naschenweng	11	0	7+1	0	1	0	1	0	0+1	0
20	DF	(Germany) GER	Franziska Kett	13	1	4+2	0	2	0	0	0	5	1
Midfielders
8	MF	(Germany) GER	Lena Oberdorf	2	0	0+2	0	0	0	0	0	0	0
10	MF	(Germany) GER	Linda Dallmann	17	3	8+2	3	1	0	1	0	5	0
14	MF	(Germany) GER	Alara Şehitler	15	3	4+5	2	2	0	1	0	0+3	1
15	MF	(Ivory Coast) CIV	Bernadette Amani	14	2	8	2	1+1	0	0	0	4	0
18	MF	(Japan) JPN	Momoko Tanikawa	17	4	8+2	3	1	0	0+1	0	5	1
25	MF	(Austria) AUT	Sarah Zadrazil	10	1	1+5	1	1	0	0	0	1+2	0
28	MF	(Austria) AUT	Barbara Dunst	5	0	0+4	0	0	0	0+1	0	0	0
Forwards
6	FW	(Germany) GER	Kassandra Potsi	9	0	1+5	0	1+1	0	0+1	0	0	0
9	FW	(Serbia) SRB	Jovana Damnjanović	13	3	5+1	2	1+1	0	1	1	3+1	0
17	FW	(Germany) GER	Klara Bühl	15	11	8	6	0+1	0	1	2	5	3
21	FW	(Denmark) DEN	Pernille Harder	18	6	9+1	3	1+1	1	1	0	5	2
23	FW	(Netherlands) NED	Sophie Proost	14	2	4+4	1	2	0	0+1	0	0+3	1
29	FW	(Spain) ESP	Edna Imade	16	7	4+6	6	1+1	0	0	0	2+2	1
Players transferred/loaned out during the season
27	MF	(Italy) ITA	Arianna Caruso	1	0	0	0	0	0	1	0	0	0

Source: Competitions

=== Goalscorers ===
As of match played 19 November 2026

Includes all competitive matches. The list is sorted alphabetically by surname when total goals are equal.

Rank	No.	Pos.	Nat.	Player	Bundesliga	DFB-Pokal	DFB-Supercup	Champions League	Total
1	17	FW	(Germany)	Klara Bühl	6	0	2	3	11
2	29	FW	(Spain)	Edna Imade	6	0	0	1	7
3	21	FW	(Denmark)	Pernille Harder	3	1	0	2	6
4	2	DF	(Canada)	Vanessa Gilles	3	2	0	0	5
5	18	MF	(Japan)	Momoko Tanikawa	3	0	0	1	4
6	10	MF	(Germany)	Linda Dallmann	3	0	0	0	3
6	9	FW	(Serbia)	Jovana Damnjanović	2	0	1	0	3
6	14	MF	(Germany)	Alara Şehitler	2	0	0	1	3
9	15	MF	(Ivory Coast)	Bernadette Amani	2	0	0	0	2
9	7	DF	(Germany)	Giulia Gwinn	1	0	0	1	2
9	23	FW	(Netherlands)	Sophie Proost	1	0	0	1	2
12	20	DF	(Germany)	Franziska Kett	0	0	0	1	1
12	4	DF	(Iceland)	Glódís Perla Viggósdóttir	1	0	0	0	1
12	25	MF	(Austria)	Sarah Zadrazil	1	0	0	0	1
Own goals (from the opponents)					2	0	0	2	4
Totals					36	3	3	13	55
