= 2026 DFB-Supercup Frauen =

DFB-Supercup Frauen
German Women's Supercup
- Event: DFB-Supercup Frauen
Bayern Munich	VfL Wolfsburg
3	0
- Date: 15 August 2026
- Venue: Audi Sportpark, Ingolstadt
- Referee: Angelika Söder
- Attendance: 8,689

The 2026 DFB-supercup, known as Google Pixel Supercup der Frauen for sponsorship reasons, was the ninth iteration of the German women's super cup, contested by the winners of the previous season's top league and national cup competition. The match was played on 15 August 2026 at the Audi Sportpark in Ingolstadt.

Bayern Munich defeated VfL Wolfsburg 3–0 to win their third consecutive and overall title.

== Match ==
15 August 2026
19:30 CEST (UTC+2)

Bayern Munich	3–0	VfL Wolfsburg
Damnjanović 32'; Bühl 45+4', 46'	Report

Audi Sportpark, Ingolstadt
Attendance: 8,689
Referee: Angelika Söder

Bayern Munich	VfL Wolfsburg

GK	1	(Germany) Ena Mahmutovic
RB	3	(Denmark) Stine Ballisager
CB	4	(Iceland) Glódís Perla Viggósdóttir (c)	(substituted off) 54'
CB	5	(Sweden) Magdalena Eriksson
LB	19	(Austria) Katharina Naschenweng
CM	14	(Germany) Alara Şehitler	(substituted off) 63'
CM	27	(Italy) Arianna Caruso
RW	10	(Germany) Linda Dallmann
AM	21	(Denmark) Pernille Harder	(substituted off) 77'
LW	17	(Germany) Klara Bühl
CF	9	(Serbia) Jovana Damnjanović	(substituted off) 77'
Substitutes:
GK	22	(Netherlands) Regina van Eijk
DF	11	(Germany) Sarah Mattner-Trembleau
DF	36	(Germany) Laura Dafinger
MF	15	(Ivory Coast) Bernadette Amani
MF	18	(Japan) Momoko Tanikawa	(substituted on) 63'
MF	23	(Netherlands) Sophie Proost	(substituted on) 77'
MF	28	(Austria) Barbara Dunst	(substituted on) 54'
FW	6	(Germany) Kassandra Potsi	(substituted on) 77'
FW	33	(Austria) Ella Rauscha
Manager:
(Spain) José Barcala

GK	1	(Germany) Stina Johannes
RB	2	(Norway) Thea Bjelde		(substituted off) 80'
CB	3	(Netherlands) Lieske Carleer		(substituted off) 70'
CB	16	(Germany) Camilla Küver
LB	39	(Germany) Sarai Linder		(substituted off) 81'
CM	6	(Germany) Janina Minge	(yellow card) 90+3'
CM	5	(Netherlands) Ella Peddemors
RW	10	(Germany) Svenja Huth (c)
AM	15	(Poland) Weronika Araśniewicz		(substituted off) 63'
LW	28	(Germany) Cora Zicai
CF	38	(Norway) Anny Kerim-Lindland		(substituted off) 63'
Substitutes:
GK	21	(Germany) Martina Tufekovic
DF	4	(Germany) Sophia Kleinherne	(yellow card) 90+2'	(substituted on) 70'
DF	20	(Germany) Julia Landenberger
DF	23	(France) Lou Bogaert		(substituted on) 80'
DF	24	(Germany) Joelle Wedemeyer		(substituted on) 81'
DF	33	(Spain) Judit Pujols
MF	17	(Germany) Katharina Piljić		(substituted on) 63'
FW	9	(Slovenia) Lara Prašnikar		(substituted on) 63'
FW	41	(Norway) Linnea Sælen
Manager:
(Germany) Stephan Lerch

Assistant referees:
Annette Hanf
Alessa Plass
Fourth official:
Selina Menzel
Video assistant referee:
Patrick Hanslbauer
Assistant video assistant referee:
Markus Sinn

Match rules

- 90 minutes
- Penalty shoot-out if scores level
- Maximum of nine named substitutes
- Maximum of five substitutions
- Maximum of three substitution opportunities
