= Arianna Caruso =

Italian footballer (born 1999)

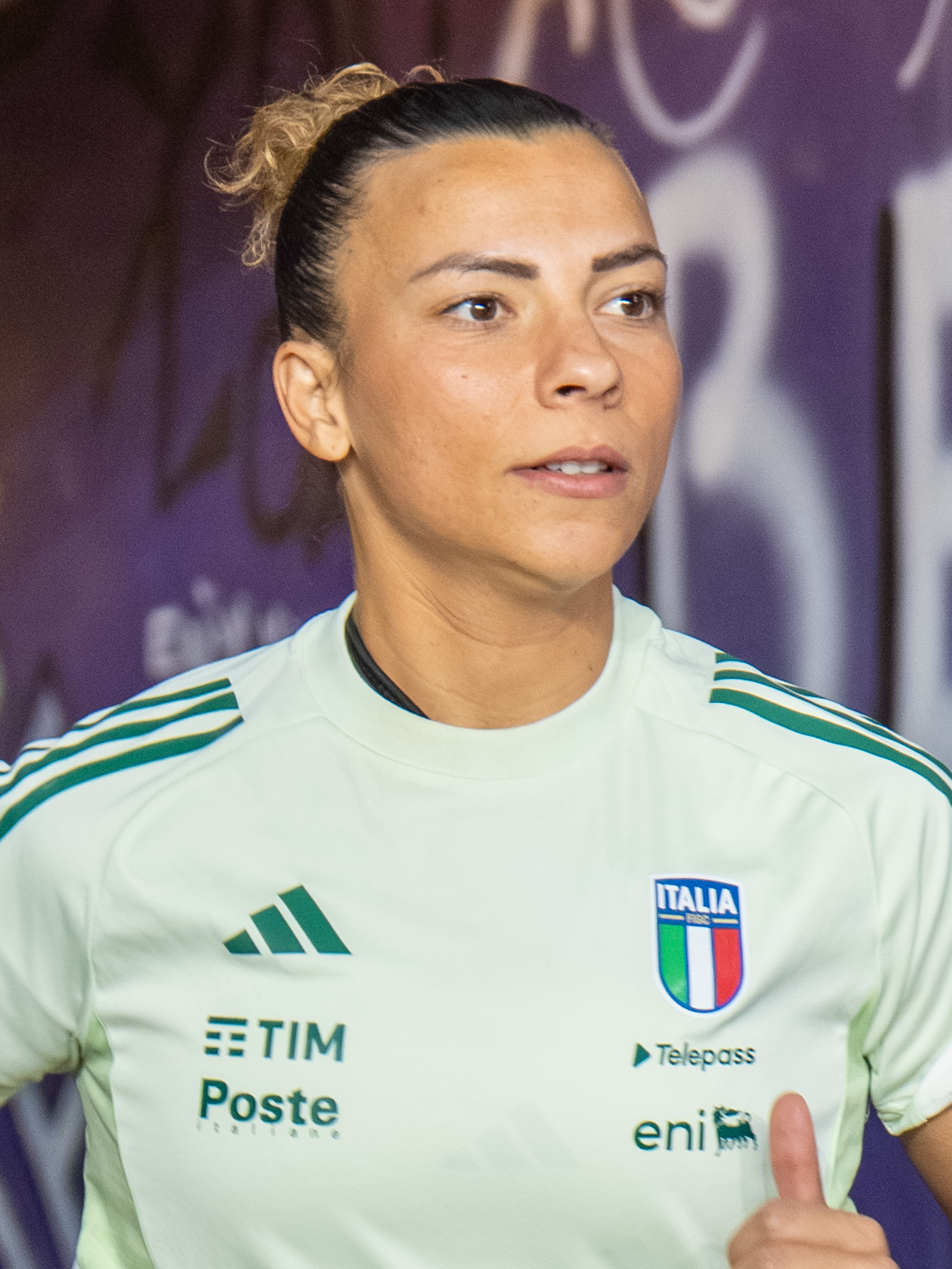
- Caruso with Italy in 2025

Personal information
- Date of birth: 6 November 1999 (age 27)
- Place of birth: Rome, Italy
- Position: Midfielder

Team information
- Current team: Real Madrid
- Number: 24

Senior career*
| Years | Team | Apps | (Gls) |
| 2014–2017 | Res Roma | 34 | (8) |
| 2017–2025 | Juventus | 158 | (39) |
| 2025 | → Bayern Munich (loan) | 7 | (0) |
| 2025–2026 | Bayern Munich | 20 | (3) |
| 2026– | Real Madrid | 9 | (1) |

International career^{‡}
| 2015–2016 | Italy U17 | 13 | (5) |
| 2016–2017 | Italy U19 | 6 | (2) |
| 2019– | Italy | 60 | (17) |
- * Club domestic league appearances and goals as of 12 November 2026 ‡ National team caps and goals as of 18:37, 3 July 2025 (UTC)

Arianna Caruso (born 6 November 1999) is an Italian professional footballer who plays as a midfielder for Liga F club Real Madrid and the Italy national team.

== Club career ==
Caruso who started her career at Res Roma moved to Juventus in 2017. She won with Juventus six Seria-A titles and three Coppa Italia in eight seasons from 2017 to 2025.

In February 2025, she joined German side Bayern Munich for the remainder of the 2024–25 season. After end of the loan, Caruso signed a permanent contract with Bayern Munich until 2028.

On 24 August 2026, Caruso signed a four-year contract with Liga F club Real Madrid.

== International career ==
Caruso has been capped for the Italy national team, appearing for the team during the UEFA Women's Euro 2021 qualifying cycle.

She scored her first international goal against Israel on 24 February 2021 at the UEFA Women's Euro 2022 qualifying.

On 26 June 2022, Caruso was announced in the Italy squad for the UEFA Women's Euro 2022.

On 2 July 2023, Caruso was called up to the 23-player Italy squad for the 2023 FIFA Women's World Cup.

On 25 June 2025, Caruso was called up to the Italy squad for the UEFA Women's Euro 2025.

== Career statistics ==
=== Club ===
As of match played 18 November 2026

Appearances and goals by club, season and competition
| Club | Season | League | | | National cup (Note: Includes Coppa Italia, DFB Pokal) | | Continental | | Other | | Total | |
| Club | Season | Division | Apps | Goals | Apps | Goals | Apps | Goals | Apps | Goals | Apps | Goals |
|---|---|---|---|---|---|---|---|---|---|---|---|---|
| Res Roma | 2014–15 | Serie A | 1 | 0 | 0 | 0 | — | | — | | 1 | 0 |
| Res Roma | 2015–16 | Serie A | 15 | 2 | 1 | 1 | — | | — | | 16 | 3 |
| Res Roma | 2016–17 | Serie A | 18 | 6 | 1 | 2 | — | | — | | 19 | 8 |
| Res Roma | Total | | 34 | 8 | 2 | 3 | — | | — | | 36 | 11 |
| Juventus | 2017–18 | Serie A | 20 | 3 | 5 | 6 | — | | — | | 25 | 9 |
| Juventus | 2018–19 | Serie A | 22 | 2 | 6 | 2 | 1 (Note: Appearance(s) in UEFA Women's Champions League) | 0 | 1 (Note: Appearance(s) in Supercoppa Italiana) | 0 | 30 | 4 |
| Juventus | 2019–20 | Serie A | 14 | 2 | 2 | 1 | 2 | 0 | 1 | 0 | 19 | 3 |
| Juventus | 2020–21 | Serie A | 20 | 7 | 4 | 0 | 2 | 0 | 2 | 0 | 28 | 7 |
| Juventus | 2021–22 | Serie A | 19 | 8 | 7 | 4 | 12 | 4 | 2 | 0 | 40 | 16 |
| Juventus | 2022–23 | Serie A | 25 | 5 | 7 | 1 | 9 | 2 | 1 | 0 | 42 | 8 |
| Juventus | 2023–24 | Serie A | 25 | 7 | 1 | 0 | 2 | 1 | 0 | 0 | 28 | 8 |
| Juventus | 2024–25 | Serie A | 13 | 5 | 0 | 0 | 8 | 0 | 0 | 0 | 21 | 5 |
| Juventus | Total | | 158 | 39 | 32 | 14 | 36 | 7 | 7 | 0 | 233 | 60 |
| Bayern Munich (loan) | 2024–25 | Frauen-Bundesliga | 7 | 0 | 2 | 0 | 2 | 0 | 0 | 0 | 11 | 0 |
| Bayern Munich | 2025–26 | Frauen-Bundesliga | 20 | 3 | 5 | 1 | 10 | 0 | — | | 35 | 4 |
| Bayern Munich | 2026–27 | Frauen-Bundesliga | 0 | 0 | 0 | 0 | 0 | 0 | 1 (Note: Appearances in DFB-Supercup) | 0 | 1 | 0 |
| Bayern Munich | Total | | 27 | 3 | 7 | 1 | 12 | 0 | 1 | 0 | 47 | 4 |
| Real Madrid | 2026–27 | Liga F | 9 | 1 | 0 | 0 | 6 | 1 | 0 | 0 | 15 | 2 |
| Career Total | | | 228 | 51 | 41 | 18 | 54 | 8 | 8 | 0 | 324 | 76 |

=== International ===
As of match played 3 July 2025

Appearances and goals by national team and year
| National team | Year | Apps | Goals |
|---|---|---|---|
| Italy | 2019 | 2 | 0 |
| Italy | 2020 | 3 | 0 |
| Italy | 2021 | 9 | 3 |
| Italy | 2022 | 14 | 7 |
| Italy | 2023 | 15 | 5 |
| Italy | 2024 | 10 | 0 |
| Italy | 2025 | 7 | 2 |
| Total | | 60 | 17 |

Scores and results list Italy's goal tally first, score column indicates score after each Caruso goal.

List of international goals scored by Arianna Caruso
| No. | Date | Venue | Opponent | Score | Result | Competition |
|---|---|---|---|---|---|---|
| 1 | 24 February 2021 | Stadio Artemio Franchi, Florence, Italy | Israel | 9–0 | 12–0 | UEFA Women's Euro 2022 qualifying |
| 2 | 10 April 2021 | Campo Enzo Bearzot, Coverciano, Italy | Iceland | 1–0 | 1–0 | Friendly |
| 3 | 26 October 2021 | LFF Stadium, Vilnius, Lithuania | Lithuania | 5–0 | 5–0 | 2023 FIFA Women's World Cup qualification |
| 4 | 20 February 2022 | Estádio Algarve, Algarve, Portugal | Norway | 2–0 | 2–1 | 2022 Algarve Cup |
| 5 | 8 April 2022 | Stadio Ennio Tardini, Parma, Italy | Lithuania | 1–0 | 7–0 | 2023 FIFA Women's World Cup qualification |
| 6 | 8 April 2022 | Stadio Ennio Tardini, Parma, Italy | Lithuania | 3–0 | 7–0 | 2023 FIFA Women's World Cup qualification |
| 7 | 2 September 2022 | Zimbru Stadium, Chișinău, Moldova | Moldova | 3–0 | 8–0 | 2023 FIFA Women's World Cup qualification |
| 8 | 2 September 2022 | Zimbru Stadium, Chișinău, Moldova | Moldova | 5–0 | 8–0 | 2023 FIFA Women's World Cup qualification |
| 9 | 2 September 2022 | Zimbru Stadium, Chișinău, Moldova | Moldova | 6–0 | 8–0 | 2023 FIFA Women's World Cup qualification |
| 10 | 2 September 2022 | Zimbru Stadium, Chișinău, Moldova | Moldova | 8–0 | 8–0 | 2023 FIFA Women's World Cup qualification |
| 11 | 22 February 2023 | Ashton Gate Stadium, Bristol, England | South Korea | 1–0 | 2–1 | 2023 Arnold Clark Cup |
| 12 | 2 August 2023 | Wellington Regional Stadium, Wellington, New Zealand | South Africa | 1–0 | 2–3 | 2023 FIFA Women's World Cup |
| 13 | 2 August 2023 | Wellington Regional Stadium, Wellington, New Zealand | South Africa | 2–2 | 2–3 | 2023 FIFA Women's World Cup |
| 14 | 22 September 2023 | Kybunpark, St. Gallen, Switzerland | Switzerland | 1–0 | 1–0 | 2023–24 UEFA Women's Nations League |
| 15 | 5 December 2023 | Stadio Ennio Tardini, Parma, Italy | Switzerland | 3–0 | 3–0 | 2023–24 UEFA Women's Nations League |
| 16 | 8 April 2025 | MCH Arena, Herning, Denmark | Denmark | 1–0 | 3–0 | 2025 UEFA Women's Nations League |
| 17 | 3 July 2025 | Stade de Tourbillon, Sion, Switzerland | Belgium | 1–0 | 1–0 | UEFA Women's Euro 2025 |
| 18 | 14 April 2026 | Dubočica Stadium, Leskovac, Serbia | Serbia | 4–0 | 6–0 | 2027 FIFA Women's World Cup qualification |
| 19 | 5 June 2026 | Arena Garibaldi, Pisa, Italy | Serbia | 2–0 | 3–0 | 2027 FIFA Women's World Cup qualification |

== Honours ==
Juventus

- Serie A: 2017–18, 2018–19, 2019–20, 2020–21, 2021–22, 2024–25
- Coppa Italia: 2018–19, 2021–22, 2022–23
- Supercoppa Italiana: 2019–20, 2020–21, 2021–22

Bayern Munich

- Bundesliga: 2024–25, 2025–26
- DFB-Pokal: 2024–25, 2025–26
- DFB-Supercup Frauen: 2026

Individual

- Serie A Women's Team of the Year: 2020–21, 2021–22, 2022–23
