= Linda Dallmann =

German women's footballer

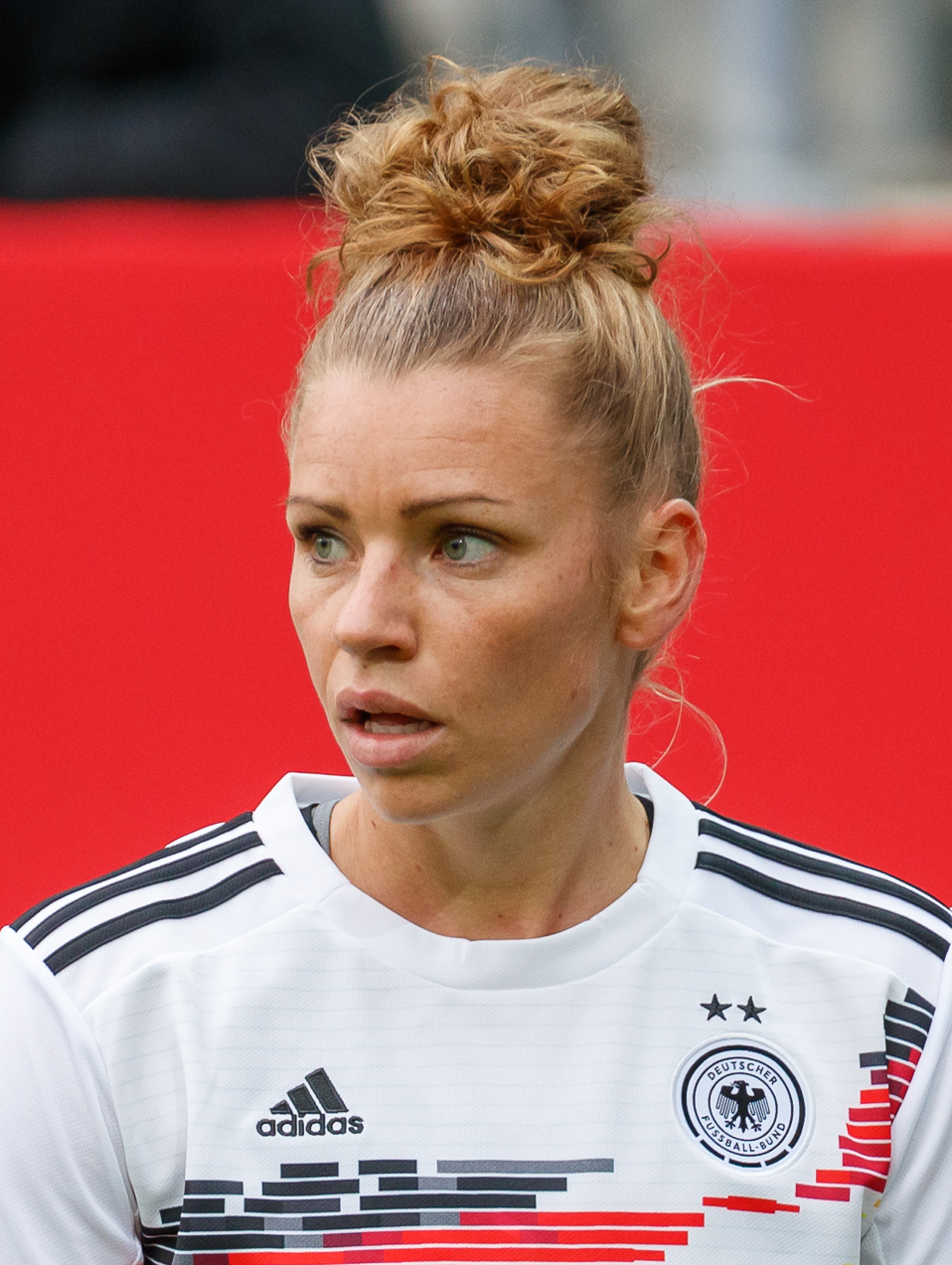
- Dallmann with Germany in 2021

Personal information
- Full name: Linda Dallmann
- Date of birth: 2 September 1994 (age 32)
- Place of birth: Dinslaken, Germany
- Height: 1.58 m (5 ft 2 in)
- Position: Midfielder

Team information
- Current team: Bayern Munich
- Number: 10

Senior career*
Years	Team	Apps	(Gls)
2011	Bayer Leverkusen	1	(0)
2011–2019	SGS Essen	157	(28)
2019–	Bayern Munich	143	(46)

International career^{‡}
2010	Germany U16	6	(0)
2010–2011	Germany U17	4	(0)
2011–2013	Germany U19	14	(7)
2014	Germany U20	6	(0)
2016–	Germany	80	(17)
Medal record
UEFA Women's Championship
Silver medal – second place	2022 England
UEFA Women's Nations League
Bronze medal – third place	2024 France–Netherlands–Spain
- * Club domestic league appearances and goals as of 20:20, 14 November 2026 (UTC) ‡ National team caps and goals as of 21:10, 13 October 2026 (UTC)

Linda Dallmann (born 2 September 1994) is a German professional footballer who plays for Frauen-Bundesliga club Bayern Munich and the Germany national team.

== Club career ==
Linda Dallmann started playing football at STV Hünxe and finally came to FCR 2001 Duisburg via PSV Wesel-Lackhausen, for which she was active from 2009 to 2010 in the B youth. In the 2010–11 season she played for Bayer 04 Leverkusen. On 6 March 2011 (21st matchday), she made her debut in the Bundesliga in a 7–1 defeat at home against 1. FFC Turbine Potsdam, substituting for Eunice Beckmann in the second half. For the 2011/12 season, the offensive player moved to league rivals SG Essen-Schoenebeck. There she scored her first Bundesliga goal on 16 October 2011 (7th matchday) in a 4–0 away win against 1. FC Lokomotive Leipzig with the goal to make it 2–0 in the 75th minute.

For the 2019/20 season, she was signed by league rivals FC Bayern Munich, with whom she received a contract in March 2019 that was valid until 30 June 2021. In February 2020, she extended her contract to 2023. She helped her team win the Bundesliga in the 2021–2022 season. In December 2022, she extended her contract for a further three years to 2026.

== International career ==
=== Youth ===
Linda Dallmann was active for the first time on 18 May 2010 in the game of the U-16 national team against the French team for a junior selection of the German Football Association. For the U-17 national team, she scored her first international goal in April 2011 as part of the Euro 2011 qualifier.

In March 2014, Dallmann made her debut for the U-20 national team as part of the Six Nations Tournament in La Manga. She also took part in the U-20 World Cup held in Canada in August 2014, played all six tournament games, and became world champion with a 1–0 victory in overtime in the final against Nigeria's selection.

=== Senior ===
She was first selected for the Germany national team in September 2016 by national coach Steffi Jones, and made her official debut on 16 September 2016 in Moscow, in the team's 4–0 win over Russia in a European Championship qualifier.

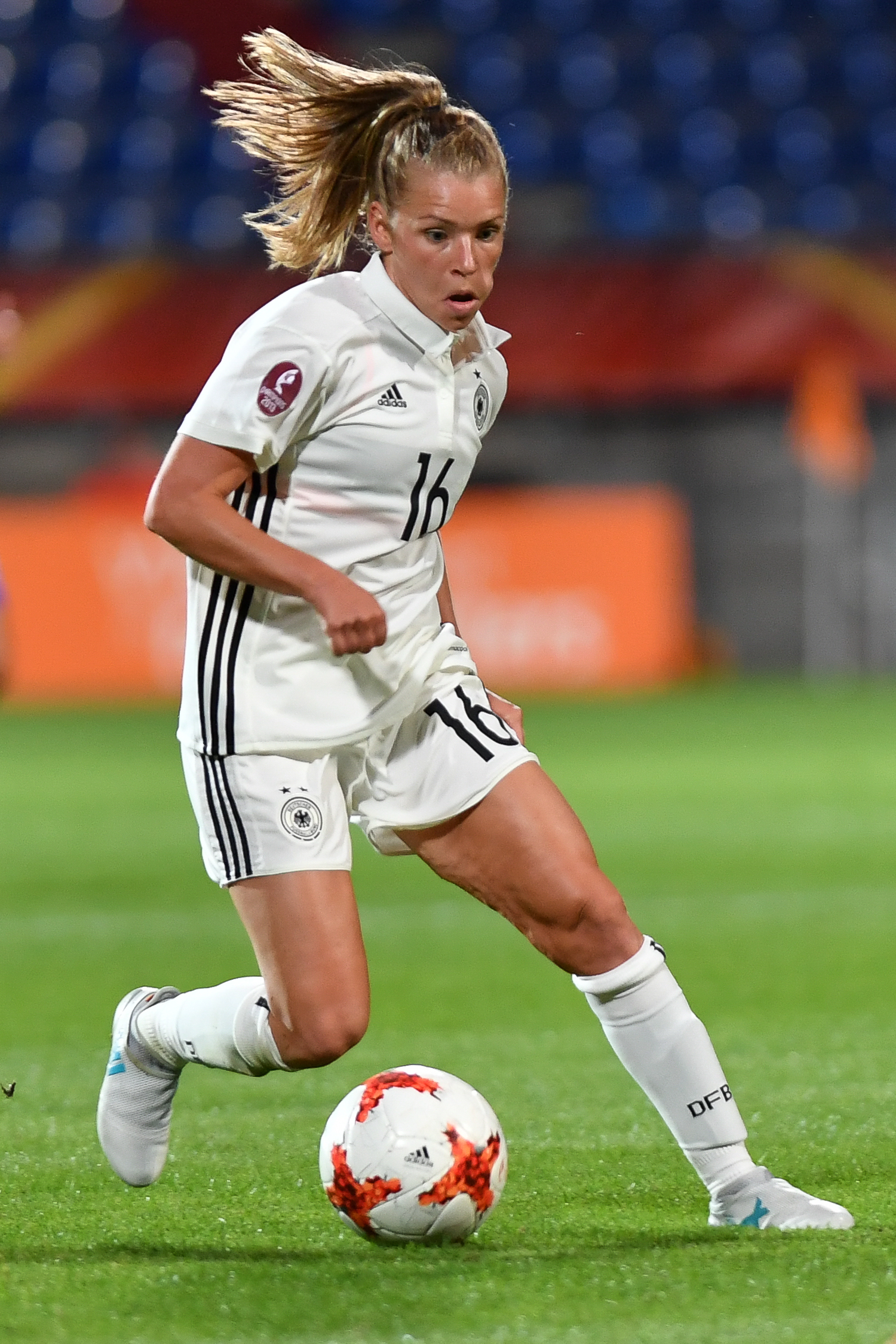
Dallmann during Euro 2017

In the 2017 European Championship tournament in the Netherlands, in which she played two out of four games, her team was eliminated in the quarter-finals against the national team of Denmark. For the 2019 World Cup, she was called up to the squad by national coach Martina Voss-Tecklenburg. She reached the quarterfinals with the national team.

For the European Championship 2022 in England she was appointed to the squad by national coach Voss-Tecklenburg. The German team reached the final, but were defeated by England. Dallmann appeared in all six games, being a substitute five times.

On 12 June 2025, Dallmann was called up to the Germany squad for the UEFA Women's Euro 2025.

== Career statistics ==
=== Club ===
As of match played 19 November 2026

Appearances and goals by club, season and competition
Club	Season	League			DFB Pokal		Continental (Note: Includes UEFA Women's Champions League)		Other (Note: Includes DFB-Supercup)		Total	
Club	Season	Division	Apps	Goals	Apps	Goals	Apps	Goals	Apps	Goals	Apps	Goals
Bayer Leverkusen	2010–11	Frauen-Bundesliga	1	0	0	0	–		–		1	0
SGS Essen	2011–12	Frauen-Bundesliga	22	2	0	0	–		–		22	2
SGS Essen	2012–13	Frauen-Bundesliga	21	2	1	1	–		–		22	3
SGS Essen	2013–14	Frauen-Bundesliga	22	6	5	3	–		–		27	9
SGS Essen	2014–15	Frauen-Bundesliga	21	2	2	2	–		–		23	4
SGS Essen	2015–16	Frauen-Bundesliga	22	1	2	0	–		–		24	1
SGS Essen	2016–17	Frauen-Bundesliga	16	2	2	0	–		–		18	2
SGS Essen	2017–18	Frauen-Bundesliga	21	12	4	4	–		–		25	16
SGS Essen	2018–19	Frauen-Bundesliga	12	1	1	0	–		–		13	1
SGS Essen	Total		157	28	17	10	–		–		174	38
Bayern Munich	2019–20	Frauen-Bundesliga	21	10	1	0	4	0	–		26	10
Bayern Munich	2020–21	Frauen-Bundesliga	22	6	4	1	8	3	–		34	10
Bayern Munich	2021–22	Frauen-Bundesliga	19	7	4	0	6	2	–		29	9
Bayern Munich	2022–23	Frauen-Bundesliga	11	6	3	3	4	3	–		18	12
Bayern Munich	2023–24	Frauen-Bundesliga	21	7	5	0	5	0	–		31	7
Bayern Munich	2024–25	Frauen-Bundesliga	18	1	3	1	8	1	1	0	29	3
Bayern Munich	2025–26	Frauen-Bundesliga	22	7	3	0	9	2	1	0	35	9
Bayern Munich	2026–27	Frauen-Bundesliga	10	3	1	0	5	0	1	0	17	3
Bayern Munich	Total		144	47	24	5	50	12	3	0	221	64
Career total			302	74	41	15	50	12	2	0	395	102

=== International ===
As of 13 October 2026

Appearances and goals by national team and year
National team	Year	Apps	Goals
Germany	2016	2	0
Germany	2017	9	2
Germany	2018	7	2
Germany	2019	9	2
Germany	2020	3	1
Germany	2021	10	4
Germany	2022	15	1
Germany	2023	4	0
Germany	2024	4	0
Germany	2025	9	2
Germany	2026	8	2
Total		79	16

Scores and results list Germany's goal tally first, score column indicates score after each Dallmann goal.

List of international goals scored by Linda Dallmann
No.	Date	Venue	Opponent	Score	Result	Competition
1	9 April 2017	Erfurt, Germany	Canada	2–1	2–1	Friendly
2	4 July 2017	Sandhausen, Germany	Brazil	1–0	3–1	Friendly
3	10 April 2018	Domžale, Slovenia	Slovenia	4–0	4–0	2019 FIFA Women's World Cup qualifying
4	6 October 2018	Essen, Germany	Austria	2–1	3–1	Friendly
5	6 April 2019	Stockholm, Sweden	Sweden	2–0	2–1	Friendly
6	31 August 2019	Kassel, Germany	Montenegro	10–0	10–0	UEFA Women's Euro 2022 qualifying
7	27 November 2020	Ingolstadt, Germany	Greece	5–0	6–0	UEFA Women's Euro 2022 qualifying
8	10 April 2021	Wiesbaden, Germany	Australia	5–1	5–2	Friendly
9	13 April 2021	Wiesbaden, Germany	Norway	2–1	3–1	Friendly
10	18 September 2021	Cottbus, Germany	Bulgaria	4–0	7–0	2023 FIFA Women's World Cup qualification
11	18 September 2021	Cottbus, Germany	Bulgaria	7–0	7–0	2023 FIFA Women's World Cup qualification
12	24 June 2022	Erfurt, Germany	Switzerland	5–0	7–0	Friendly
13	25 February 2025	Nuremberg, Germany	Austria	2–1	4–1	2025 UEFA Women's Nations League
14	30 May 2025	Bremen, Germany	Netherlands	1–0	4–0	2025 UEFA Women's Nations League
15	3 March 2026	Dresden, Germany	Slovenia	3–0	5–0	2027 FIFA World Cup qualification
16	13 October 2026	Weserstadion, Bremen, Germany	Japan	1–1	2–1	Friendly

== Honours ==
Bayern Munich

- Bundesliga: 2020–21, 2022–23, 2023–24, 2024–25, 2025–26
- DFB-Pokal: 2024–25, 2025–26
- DFB-Supercup: 2024, 2025, 2026

Germany U17

- UEFA Women's Under-17 Championship third place: 2011

Germany U20

- FIFA U-20 Women's World Cup: 2014

Germany

- UEFA Women's Championship runner-up: 2022
- UEFA Women's Nations League third place: 2023–24

Individual

- Germany women's national Player of the Year: 2017
