= Sophie Proost =

Dutch footballer (born 2007)

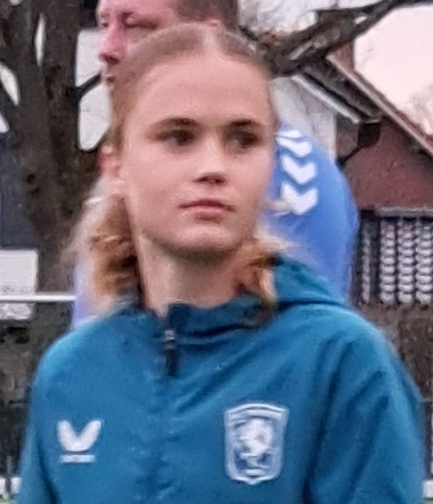
- Proost with Twente in 2025

Personal information
- Date of birth: 11 March 2007 (age 19)
- Place of birth: Hilversum, Netherlands
- Height: 1.73 m (5 ft 8 in)
- Position: Left winger

Team information
- Current team: Bayern Munich
- Number: 23

Youth career
- BFC Bussum
- Ajax

Senior career*
Years	Team	Apps	(Gls)
2024–2026	Twente	19	(3)
2026–	Bayern Munich	8	(1)

International career^{‡}
2022	Netherlands U15	4	(1)
2023	Netherlands U16	5	(0)
2023	Netherlands U17	10	(3)
2024–2026	Netherlands U19	18	(0)
- * Club domestic league appearances and goals as of 20:20, 14 November 2026 (UTC) ‡ National team caps and goals as of 17 April 2026

Sophie Proost (born 11 March 2007) is a Dutch professional footballer who plays as a left winger for Frauen-Bundesliga club Bayern Munich.

== Club career ==
On 9 July 2024, Proost signed for Twente from Ajax on a three-year contract. She made her Vrouwen Eredivisie debut on 29 September as a substitute in a season-opening 3–1 win over Fortuna Sittard. On 17 October, she made her UEFA Women's Champions League debut in a 3–1 defeat to Chelsea at home. She went through multiple bouts with pneumonia in her debut season and was limited to various substitute appearances as Twente won a domestic treble including their tenth league title.

On 27 August 2025, Proost scored her first goal for Twente in a 6–0 win over Red Star Belgrade in Champions League qualifying. She made her first start three days later and scored again in a 2–0 win against Breidablik, playing a crucial part in the club's second consecutive Champions League qualification with three goals in four games. On 6 September, she scored her first Eredivisie goal in a season-opening 3–1 win over Heerenven.

On 8 July 2026, it was announced that Proost had joined the Frauen-Bundesliga club Bayern Munich on a three-year deal until 30 June 2029 and would wear the number 23 jersey.

== International career ==
In September 2026, Proost received her first call-up to the Netherlands national team.

== Career statistics ==
=== Club ===
As of match played 19 November 2026:

Appearances and goals by club, season and competition
Club	Season	League			National Cup (Note: Includes KNVB Women's Cup, DFB-Pokal Frauen)		Continental		Other		Total	
Club	Season	Division	Apps	Goals	Apps	Goals	Apps	Goals	Apps	Goals	Apps	Goals
FC Twente	2024–25	Vrouwen Eredivisie	6	0	0	0	6	0 (Note: Appearances in UEFA Women's Champions League)	–		12	0
FC Twente	2025–26	Vrouwen Eredivisie	14	3	0	0	10	3	1	0 (Note: Appearances in KNVB Women's Super Cup)	25	6
FC Twente	Total		20	3	0	0	16	3	1	0	37	6
Bayern Munich	2026–27	Frauen-Bundesliga	8	1	2	0	3	1	1	0 (Note: Appearances in DFB-Supercup)	14	2
Career Total			28	4	2	0	19	4	2	0	51	8

== Honours ==
FC Twente

- Vrouwen Eredivisie: 2024–25
- KNVB Women's Cup: 2024–25
- Dutch Women's Super Cup: 2024, 2025

Bayern Munich

- DFB-Supercup Frauen: 2026
