= Momoko Tanikawa =

Japanese footballer (born 2005)

Momoko Tanikawa 谷川 萌々子
Personal information
- Date of birth: 7 May 2005 (age 21)
- Place of birth: Aichi, Japan
- Height: 1.68 m (5 ft 6 in)
- Position: Midfielder

Team information
- Current team: Bayern Munich
- Number: 18

Youth career
- Nagoya FC Ladies
- NGU Nagoya FC Ladies
- Nagoya Grampus Miyoshi
- Grampus Miyoshi
- 2018–2023: JFA Academy Fukushima

Senior career*
Years	Team	Apps	(Gls)
2018–2022	JFA Academy Fukushima	51	(19)
2024–	Bayern Munich	39	(11)
2024	→ FC Rosengård (loan)	20	(16)

International career^{‡}
2022	Japan U-17	4	(4)
2023	Japan U-19	3	(3)
2024–	Japan	24	(8)
Medal record
Women's football
Representing Japan
AFC Women's Asian Cup
Winner	2026 Australia
- * Club domestic league appearances and goals as of 20:40, 14 November 2026 (UTC) ‡ National team caps and goals as of 21:21, 13 October 2026 (UTC)

Momoko Tanikawa (谷川 萌々子, Tanikawa Momoko; born 7 May 2005) is a Japanese professional footballer playing as a midfielder for Frauen-Bundesliga club Bayern Munich and the Japan national team.

Tanikawa begun her career with the Japanese national team youth setup, JFA Academy Fukushima, before transferring to Europe. She has won the Damallsvenskan league title with FC Rosengård in 2024 while on loan at the club.

A full international since 2023, Tanikawa won the 2022 Asian Games women's football tournament and the 2023 Toulon Tournament with Japan, having reached the quarter-finals of the 2022 FIFA U-17 Women's World Cup with the national team, scoring in every game.

== Club career ==
=== Early career ===
From 2018 until 2023, Tanikawa played in Fukushima for the U18 team in the JFA Academy, the youth program of the Japan Football Association.

=== Bayern Munich ===
==== 2024: Loan to FC Rosengård ====
On 11 January 2024, it was announced that Tanikawa had signed with Frauen-Bundesliga club Bayern Munich. She was immediately sent on loan to Damallsvenskan club FC Rosengård for the 2024 season. She quickly established herself as a key figure in the team as the team went on to win the league title in dominant fashion, which includes a 23 games league winning streak and losing only once. She would end the season as the team and league's top scorer with 16 goals, and won the league's best breakthrough and best midfielder of season award. She return to Bayern Munich at the conclusion of the season.

==== 2025–Present: Return to first team ====
Tanikawa rejoined Bayern Munich following the conclusion of the Damallsvenskan season. She made her league debut for the team in a 3–1 league win against Hoffenheim as a 90th minute substitute on 9 February 2025. She scored her first goal for the club in a 4–1 DFB-Pokal extra-time win against Eintracht Frankfurt on 13 February 2025, where she also contributed an assist.

== International career ==
=== Youth ===
Tanikawa made her international debut in 2022. She made her debut for the U17 national team on 3 October in a 2-1 friendly loss against the United States U17 national team. With the youth national team of this age group, she also took part in the World Cup held in India from 11 to 30 October 2022, playing in all Group D matches and scoring a goal in each game. She also scored a goal in the 2-1 quarter-final loss to the U17 national team of Spain.

With the U19 national team, she took part in the Sud Ladies Cup competition as part of the Toulon Tournament from 16 to 21 May 2023, scoring four goals in three matches.

=== Senior ===
She made her senior national team debut on 14 July 2023 in a 5-0 friendly win against the Panama national team.

Tanikawa went on to win the 2022 Asian Games women's football tournament in Hangzhou, China in October 2023, scoring in a 4-1 final win over North Korea.

On 14 June 2024, Tanikawa was included in the Japan squad for the 2024 Summer Olympics.

Tanikawa was part of the Japan squad that won the 2025 SheBelieves Cup.

== Style of play ==
Tanikawa is capable of playing as a central, attacking, or defensive midfielder. She is also capable of delivering long-range passes and strikes with both feet. Known for her quick shot release with minimal backswing, she poses a constant threat from outside the penalty box. Her tactical awareness, physical composure (standing at 1.68 m), and late runs into the penalty box make her a productive goal-scoring midfielder.

== Career statistics ==
=== Club ===
As of match played 19 November 2026

Appearances and goals by club, season and competition
Club	Season	League			National cup (Note: Includes Empress's Cup, Svenska Cupen, DFB Pokal)		Continental (Note: Includes UEFA Women's Champions League)		Other (Note: Includes DFB-Supercup)		Total	
Club	Season	Division	Apps	Goals	Apps	Goals	Apps	Goals	Apps	Goals	Apps	Goals
JFA Academy Fukushima	2019	Nadeshiko Challenge League (East)	3	0	0	0	—		—		3	0
JFA Academy Fukushima	2020	Nadeshiko Challenge League (East)	6	0	1	0	—		—		7	0
JFA Academy Fukushima	2021	Nadeshiko League Division 2	14	7	1	0	—		—		15	7
JFA Academy Fukushima	2022	Nadeshiko League Division 2	15	7	1	0	—		—		16	7
JFA Academy Fukushima	2023	Nadeshiko League Division 2	13	5	1	1	—		—		14	6
JFA Academy Fukushima	Total		51	19	4	1	0	0	0	0	55	20
Bayern Munich	2024–25	Frauen-Bundesliga	6	0	2	1	2	0	0	0	10	1
Bayern Munich	2025–26	Frauen-Bundesliga	23	8	3	2	10	3	1	0	37	13
Bayern Munich	2026–27	Frauen-Bundesliga	10	3	1	0	5	1	1	0	17	4
Bayern Munich	Total		39	11	6	3	17	4	2	0	64	18
FC Rosengård (loan)	2024	Damallsvenskan	20	16	5	3	—		—		25	19
Career total			109	46	15	7	17	4	2	0	143	57

=== International ===
As of match played 13 October 2026

Appearances and goals by national team and year
National team	Year	Apps	Goals
Japan	2023	2	0
Japan	2024	6	2
Japan	2025	7	2
Japan	2026	9	4
Total		24	8

Scores and results list Japan's goal tally first, score column indicates score after each Tanikawa goal.

List of international goals scored by Momoko Tanikawa
No.	Date	Venue	Opponent	Score	Result	Competition
1	29 July 2024	Parc des Princes, Paris, France	Brazil	2–1	2–1	2024 Summer Olympics
2	26 October 2024	Japan National Stadium, Tokyo, Japan	South Korea	4–0	4–0	Friendly
3	23 February 2025	State Farm Stadium, Glendale, United States	Colombia	1–0	4–1	2025 SheBelieves Cup
4	29 November 2025	Peace Stadium, Nagasaki, Japan	Canada	1–0	3–0	Friendly
5	4 March 2026	Perth Rectangular Stadium, Perth, Australia	Chinese Taipei	1–0	2–0	2026 AFC Women's Asian Cup
6	15 March 2026	Stadium Australia, Sydney, Australia	Philippines	6–0	7–0	2026 AFC Women's Asian Cup
7	6 June 2026	Yodoko Sakura Stadium, Osaka, Japan	South Africa	3–0	5–0	Friendly
8	13 October 2026	Weserstadion, Bremen, Germany	Germany	1–0	1–2	Friendly

== Honours ==
FC Rosengård

- Damallsvenskan: 2024

Bayern Munich

- Bundesliga: 2024–25, 2025–26
- DFB-Pokal: 2024–25, 2025–26
- DFB-Supercup: 2025, 2026

Japan U19

- Sud Ladies Cup winners: 2023

Japan

- AFC Women's Asian Cup: 2026
- Asian Games: 2022
- SheBelieves Cup: 2025

Individual

- FIFA U17 Women's World Cup top scorer: 2022
- Damallsvenskan's Best Midfielder: 2024
- Damallsvenskan's Top scorer: 2024
- Damallsvenskan's Breakthrough of the Year: 2024
- Damallsvenskan's Player of the Month: April 2024
