= Barbara Dunst =

Austrian footballer

- Dunst with Austria in 2026

Personal information
- Date of birth: 25 September 1997 (age 29)
- Place of birth: Graz, Austria
- Height: 1.68 m (5 ft 6 in)
- Position: Midfielder

Team information
- Current team: Bayern Munich
- Number: 28

Youth career
- 2004–2012: SV Anger
- 2012: SC St. Ruprecht/Raab

Senior career*
Years	Team	Apps	(Gls)
2012–2014	DFC LUV Graz	25	(4)
2014–2017	SKN St. Pölten	44	(13)
2017	Bayer Leverkusen	10	(0)
2017–2019	MSV Duisburg	43	(2)
2019–2025	Eintracht Frankfurt	118	(15)
2025–	Bayern Munich	21	(1)

International career^{‡}
2013–2014	Austria U17	13	(4)
2014–2016	Austria U19	14	(4)
2016–	Austria	97	(14)
- * Club domestic league appearances and goals as of 20 October 2026 ‡ National team caps and goals as of 14 October 2026

Barbara Dunst (born 25 September 1997) is an Austrian footballer who plays as a midfielder for German Frauen-Bundesliga club Bayern Munich and the Austria women's national team. She is a two-time Austrian Women's Footballer of the Year award winner.

== Club career ==
Dunst began playing football in 2004 at SV Anger, where she played for eight years in the boys' team. In November 2012, she signed with ÖFB-Frauenliga club LUV Graz, for whom she made her debut on 10 November 2012 in a league match against FC Wacker Innsbruck.

For the 2014–15 season, she moved to league rivals and reigning cup winners SKN St. Pölten. With St. Pölten, Dunst won the domestic double in the 2014–15 campaign and repeated this championship and cup success in the following season. In the UEFA Women's Champions League, her team reached the Round of 32 in both the 2015–16 and 2016–17 seasons, being eliminated by Verona and Brøndby respectively.

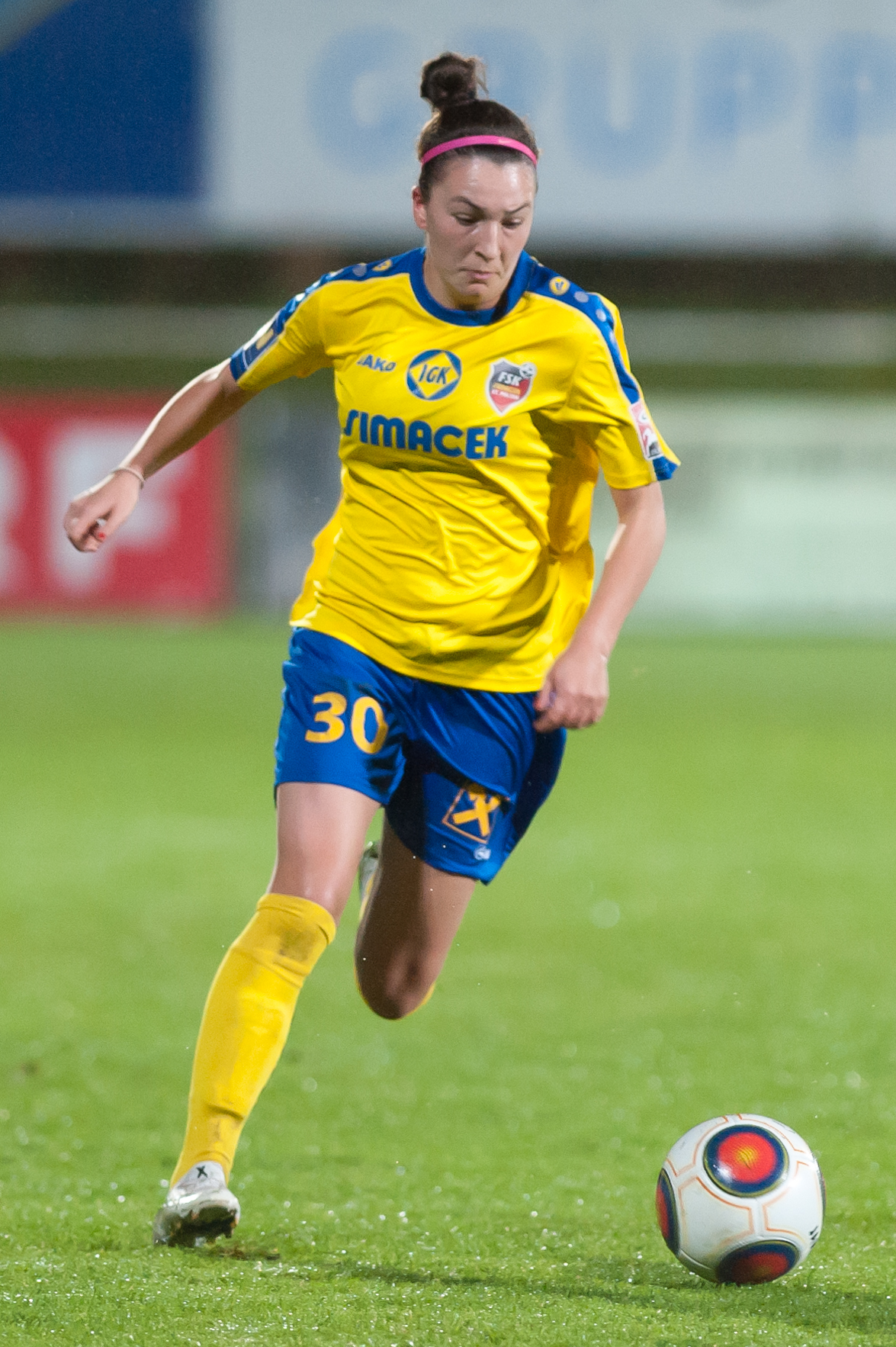
Dunst with SKN St. Pölten in 2016

During the second half of the 2016–17 season, Dunst signed a contract with the German Bundesliga club Bayer Leverkusen. She debuted for Leverkusen on 19 February 2017 against FF USV Jena in a league match which ended 1–1.

On 21 June 2017, Dunst left Leverkusen and moved to fellow Frauen-Bundesliga side MSV Duisburg. She made 46 appearances in all competitions during her two years at the club.

In 2019, Dunst joined Eintracht Frankfurt (then 1. FFC Frankfurt) and established herself as a key player for the team. She helped Frankfurt reach the 2020-21 DFB-Pokal Frauen final and played 106 minutes of the final, where they lost 1–0 after extra time to Wolfsburg. Dunst scored an impressive four goals in 10 matches in the 2023-24 UEFA Women's Champions League (including the qualifying rounds). In total, Dunst has made 147 competitive appearances for Frankfurt and scored 25 goals.

On 20 March 2025, Bayern Munich announced the signing of Dunst on a three-year contract, with the midfielder arriving in the summer. Due to a cruciate ligament rupture suffered whilst on international duty back in December 2024, the Austrian was unable to make any appearances for Bayern for many months. On 4 November, 336 days after getting injured, Dunst made her comeback as well as her Bayern debut as a substitute in a 6-0 league win away to Nürnberg.

== International career ==
Dunst playing for Austria in a match against Kazakhstan for the UEFA Women's Euro 2017 qualifying stage in April 2016

Dunst played for the Austria U17 national team between 2013 and 2014. In 2013, she participated with her team in the UEFA Women's Under-17 Championship qualification, where Austria was eliminated in the second round. In 2015, Dunst became part of the Austrian U19 team. In 2016, she played UEFA Women's Under-19 Championship, where Austria was eliminated in the group stage.

In October 2015, she was called up to the Austrian senior team for the first time for a European Championship qualifier against Israel. She made her senior international debut in that qualifier on 25 October. In March 2016, she won the Cyprus Cup with her team.

In 2017, Dunst was part of the 23-women squad who represented Austria and reached the semi-finals at the UEFA Women's Euro 2017. She was also part of the squad that was called up to the UEFA Women's Euro 2022.

In 2023, Dunst's strong performances saw her named the Austrian Women's Footballer of the Year, a prize awarded by Austrian Press Agency DiePresse. She impressively won the award for the second time the following year. In December 2024, Dunst ruptured her cruciate ligament during a Euros qualification play-off tie against Poland and missed several months of football as a result.

== Career statistics ==
=== Club ===
As of match played 19 October 2026:

Appearances and goals by club, season and competition
Club	Season	League			National Cup		Continental		Other		Total	
Club	Season	Division	Apps	Goals	Apps	Goals	Apps	Goals	Apps	Goals	Apps	Goals
DFC LUV Graz	2012–13	ÖFB Frauen Bundesliga	11	2	2	1	—		–		13	3
DFC LUV Graz	2013–14	ÖFB Frauen Bundesliga	15	2	1	0	—		–		16	2
DFC LUV Graz	Total		26	4	3	1	0	0	0	0	29	5
SKN St. Pölten	2014–15	ÖFB Frauen Bundesliga	17	3	4	4	—		–		21	7
SKN St. Pölten	2015–16	ÖFB Frauen Bundesliga	18	7	4	2	2 (Note: Appearances in UEFA Women's Champions League)	0	–		24	9
SKN St. Pölten	2016–17	ÖFB Frauen Bundesliga	9	3	3	1	2	0	–		12	4
SKN St. Pölten	Total		44	13	11	7	4	0	0	0	59	20
Bayer Leverkusen	2017	Frauen-Bundesliga	10	0	0	0	—		–		10	0
MSV Duisburg	2017–18	Frauen-Bundesliga	21	1	1	0	—		–		22	1
MSV Duisburg	2018–19	Frauen-Bundesliga	22	2	2	2	—		–		24	4
MSV Duisburg	Total		43	3	3	2	0	0	0	0	46	5
Eintracht Frankfurt	2019–20	Frauen-Bundesliga	22	3	2	0	—		–		24	3
Eintracht Frankfurt	2020–21	Frauen-Bundesliga	21	0	4	4	—		–		25	4
Eintracht Frankfurt	2021–22	Frauen-Bundesliga	22	6	2	0	—		–		24	6
Eintracht Frankfurt	2022–23	Frauen-Bundesliga	21	1	2	0	2	0	–		25	1
Eintracht Frankfurt	2023–24	Frauen-Bundesliga	22	5	4	0	10	4	–		36	9
Eintracht Frankfurt	2024–25	Frauen-Bundesliga	10	1	2	2	2	0	–		14	3
Eintracht Frankfurt	Total		118	16	16	6	14	4	0	0	148	26
Bayern Munich	2025–26	Frauen-Bundesliga	17	1	3	1	0	0	0	0	20	2
Bayern Munich	2026–27	Frauen-Bundesliga	4	0	0	0	0	0	1 (Note: Appearances in DFB-Supercup)	0	5	0
Bayern Munich	Total		21	1	3	1	0	0	1	0	25	2
Career Total			262	37	36	17	18	4	1	0	317	58

=== International ===
Scores and results list Austria's goal tally first, score column indicates score after each Dunst goal.

List of international goals scored by Barbara Dunst
No.	Date	Venue	Opponent	Score	Result	Competition
1	17 September 2014	Waldstadion, Pasching, Austria	Kazakhstan	1–0	5–0	2015 FIFA Women's World Cup qualification
2	17 September 2014	Waldstadion, Pasching, Austria	Kazakhstan	2–0	5–0	2015 FIFA Women's World Cup qualification
3	3 September 2019	Bundesstadion Südstadt, Maria Enzersdorf, Austria	North Macedonia	3–0	3–0	UEFA Women's Euro 2022 qualifying
4	8 November 2019	Toše Proeski Arena, Skopje, North Macedonia	North Macedonia	3–0	3–0	UEFA Women's Euro 2022 qualifying
5	17 September 2021	Daugava Stadium, Liepāja, Latvia	Latvia	3–1	8–1	2023 FIFA Women's World Cup qualification
6	26 October 2021	Seaview, Belfast, Northern Ireland	Northern Ireland	1–0	2–2	2023 FIFA Women's World Cup qualification
7	30 November 2021	Stade de Luxembourg, Luxembourg City, Luxembourg	Luxembourg	5–0	8–0	2023 FIFA Women's World Cup qualification
8	20 February 2022	Marbella Football Center, Marbella, Spain	Romania	1–0	6–1	Friendly
9	8 April 2022	Stadion Wiener Neustadt, Wiener Neustadt, Austria	Northern Ireland	3–0	3–1	2023 FIFA Women's World Cup qualification
10	6 September 2022	Stadion Wiener Neustadt, Wiener Neustadt, Austria	North Macedonia	5–0	10–0	2023 FIFA Women's World Cup qualification
11	27 October 2023	Stadion Schnabelholz, Altach, Austria	Portugal	2–0	2–1	2023–24 UEFA Women's Nations League
12	28 February 2024	Marbella Football Center, Marbella, Spain	Denmark	1–0	1–1	Friendly
13	25 October 2024	Bonifika Stadium, Koper, Slovenia	Slovenia	1–0	3–0	UEFA Women's Euro 2025 qualifying play-offs
14	9 June 2026	Ullevaal Stadion, Oslo, Norway	Norway	1–2	1–2	2027 FIFA World Cup qualification

== Honours ==
FSK St. Pölten-Spratzern

- ÖFB-Frauenliga: 2014–15, 2015–16
- ÖFB Cup: 2014–15, 2015–16

Bayern Munich

- Bundesliga: 2025–26
- DFB-Pokal: 2025–26
- DFB-Supercup Frauen: 2026

Individual

- Austrian Footballer of the Year (APA): 2023, 2024
