= Katharina Naschenweng =

Austrian footballer (born 1997)

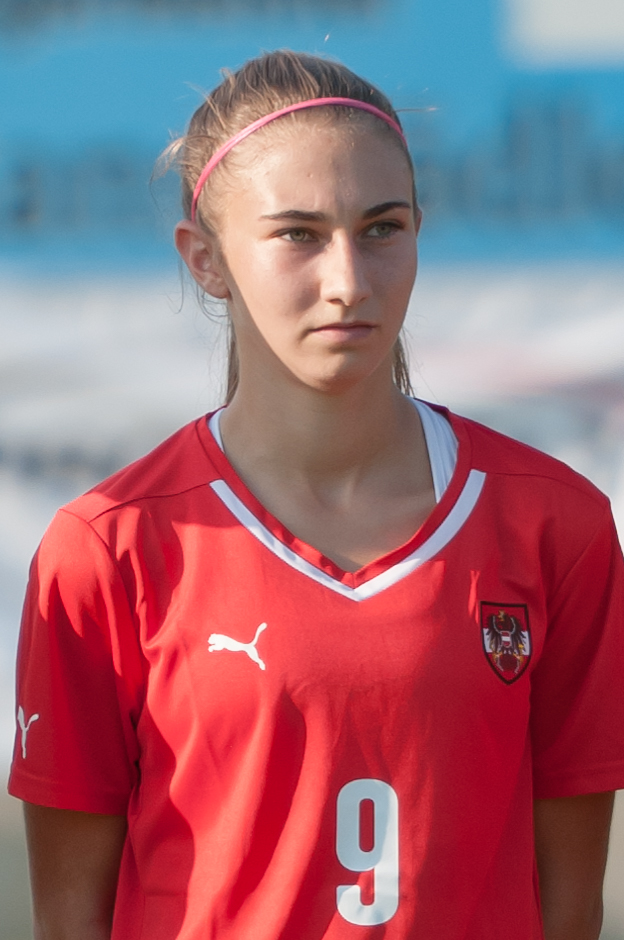
- Naschenweng representing Austria U19 at a match in August 2015

Personal information
- Full name: Katharina Elisa Naschenweng
- Date of birth: 16 December 1997 (age 28)
- Place of birth: Spittal an der Drau, Austria
- Height: 1.74 m (5 ft 8 1/2 in)
- Position: Defender

Team information
- Current team: Bayern Munich
- Number: 19

Senior career*
Years	Team	Apps	(Gls)
2013–2015	Carinthians Soccer Women		
2015–2018	Sturm Graz	28	(8)
2018–2020	TSG Hoffenheim II	5	(1)
2019–2023	TSG Hoffenheim	72	(13)
2023–	Bayern Munich	39	(3)

International career^{‡}
2013–2014	Austria U17	15	(0)
2014–2016	Austria U19	18	(1)
2016–	Austria	57	(7)
- * Club domestic league appearances and goals as of 14 November 2026 ‡ National team caps and goals as of 9 June 2026

Katharina Elisa Naschenweng (born 16 December, 1997) is an Austrian footballer who primarily plays as a left-back or left winger for Bayern Munich in the Frauen-Bundesliga and the Austria national team.

== Club career ==
Born in Spittal an der Drau, Naschenweng began playing football with local side SV Rothenthurn. At age 18, she signed with ÖFB-Frauenliga side Sturm Graz. In the 2017-18 UEFA Women's Champions League qualifying round, the youngster impressively scored four goals in three matches.

In 2019, three years after joining Sturm Graz, Naschenweng joined German Bundesliga side TSG Hoffenheim. She initially played with their U20s but almost immediately moved to the senior team due to her strong performances. After recovering from a cruciate ligament tear, Naschenweng established herself as Hoffenheim's first-choice left-sided defender.

After scoring four goals in 29 league matches, Naschenweng extended her contract with Hoffenheim through to 2023. Over the seasons from 2020-21 to 2022-23, she started 63 of their 66 Bundesliga matches.

On 17 January 2023, Naschenweng signed with fellow German club Bayern Munich on a three-year deal, joining in the summer for the 2023-24 campaign. She started 17 of Bayern's 22 league games in her first season, scoring three goals and helping them win the Bundesliga title. "Kathi" started the 2024 DFB-Pokal Frauen final, which Bayern lost 2–0 to VfL Wolfsburg.

In June 2024, Bayern announced Naschenweng required an operation after suffering a serious cruciate ligament rupture. She missed nearly one year of football due to the injury.

== International career ==
Naschenweng was part of the Austrian U-17 national team that competed at the 2014 UEFA Women's Under-17 Championship in England. She was also part of the Austrian U-19 national team that represented Austria at the 2016 UEFA Women's Under-19 Championship in Slovakia.

On 6 June 2016, Naschenweng made her senior international debut for Austria at the age of 18 against Israel. She replaced Sarah Puntigam in the 75th-minute of a 4–0 win in a UEFA Women's Euro 2017 qualifying match.

In 2017, Naschenweng was part of the 23-women squad that represented Austria and reached the semi-finals at the UEFA Women's Euro.

Naschenweng was included in the Austrian squad for the UEFA Women's Euro 2022. She scored in a 2–0 win over Northern Ireland in Southampton.

== Career statistics ==
=== Club ===
As of match played 14 November 2026:

Appearances and goals by club, season and competition
Club	Season	League			National Cup		Continental		Other		Total	
Club	Season	Division	Apps	Goals	Apps	Goals	Apps	Goals	Apps	Goals	Apps	Goals
Carinthians Soccer Women	2013–14	ÖFB Frauen Bundesliga	18	2	2	0	—		—		20	2
Carinthians Soccer Women	2014–15	ÖFB Frauen 2. Liga Ost/Süd	16	9	2	0	—		2 (Note: Appearance in the Relegation)	0	21	11
Carinthians Soccer Women	Total		34	11	4	0	0	0	2	0	40	11
Sturm Graz	2015–16	ÖFB Frauen Bundesliga	18	5	2	1	—		–		20	6
Sturm Graz	2016–17	ÖFB Frauen Bundesliga	17	10	1	2	2 (Note: Appearances in UEFA Women's Champions League)	0	–		20	12
Sturm Graz	2017–18	ÖFB Frauen Bundesliga	16	5	2	3	3	4	–		21	12
Sturm Graz	Total		51	20	5	6	5	4	0	0	61	30
TSG Hoffenheim II	2018–19	2. Frauen-Bundesliga	1	0	—		—		–		1	0
TSG Hoffenheim II	2019–20	2. Frauen-Bundesliga	4	1	—		—		–		4	1
TSG Hoffenheim II	Total		5	1	0	0	0	0	0	0	5	1
TSG Hoffenheim	2019–20	Frauen-Bundesliga	8	2	1	0	—		–		9	2
TSG Hoffenheim	2020–21	Frauen-Bundesliga	21	1	2	0	—		–		23	1
TSG Hoffenheim	2020–21	Frauen-Bundesliga	21	3	2	1	10	1	–		33	5
TSG Hoffenheim	2022–23	Frauen-Bundesliga	22	6	3	0	—		–		25	6
TSG Hoffenheim	Total		72	12	8	1	10	1	0	0	90	14
Bayern Munich	2023–24	Frauen-Bundesliga	17	3	4	0	6	0	–		27	0
Bayern Munich	2024–25	Frauen-Bundesliga	–		–		–		–		0	0
Bayern Munich	2025–26	Frauen-Bundesliga	14	0	2	0	2	0	–		18	0
Bayern Munich	2026–27	Frauen-Bundesliga	8	0	1	0	1	0	1 (Note: Appearances in DFB-Supercup)	0	11	0
Bayern Munich	Total		39	3	7	0	9	0	1	0	56	3
Career Total			201	47	24	7	24	5	3	0	252	59

=== International goals ===
Scores and results list Austria's goal tally first:

No.	Date	Location	Opponent	Score	Result	Competition
1	22 October 2021	Stadion Wiener Neustadt, Wiener Neustadt, Austria	Luxembourg	2–0	5–0	2023 FIFA Women's World Cup qualification
2	20 February 2022	Marbella Football Center, Marbella, Spain	Romania	3–0	6–1	Friendly
3	12 April 2022	Stadion Wiener Neustadt, Wiener Neustadt, Austria	Latvia	6–0	8–0	2023 FIFA Women's World Cup qualification
4	11 July 2022	St. Mary's Stadium, Southampton, England	Northern Ireland	2–0	2–0	UEFA Women's Euro 2022
5	6 September 2022	Stadion Wiener Neustadt, Wiener Neustadt, Austria	North Macedonia	9–0	10–0	2023 FIFA Women's World Cup qualification
6	11 April 2023	Stadion Wiener Neustadt, Wiener Neustadt, Austria	Czech Republic	2–0	2–0	Friendly
7	5 June 2026	Wiener-Sport-Club Platz, Vienna, Austria	Slovenia	1–0	1–0	2027 FIFA Women's World Cup qualification

== Honours ==
Bayern Munich

- Bundesliga: 2023–24, 2025–26
- DFB-Pokal: 2025–26
- DFB-Supercup Frauen: 2026
