= Jovana Damnjanović =

Serbian footballer (born 1994)

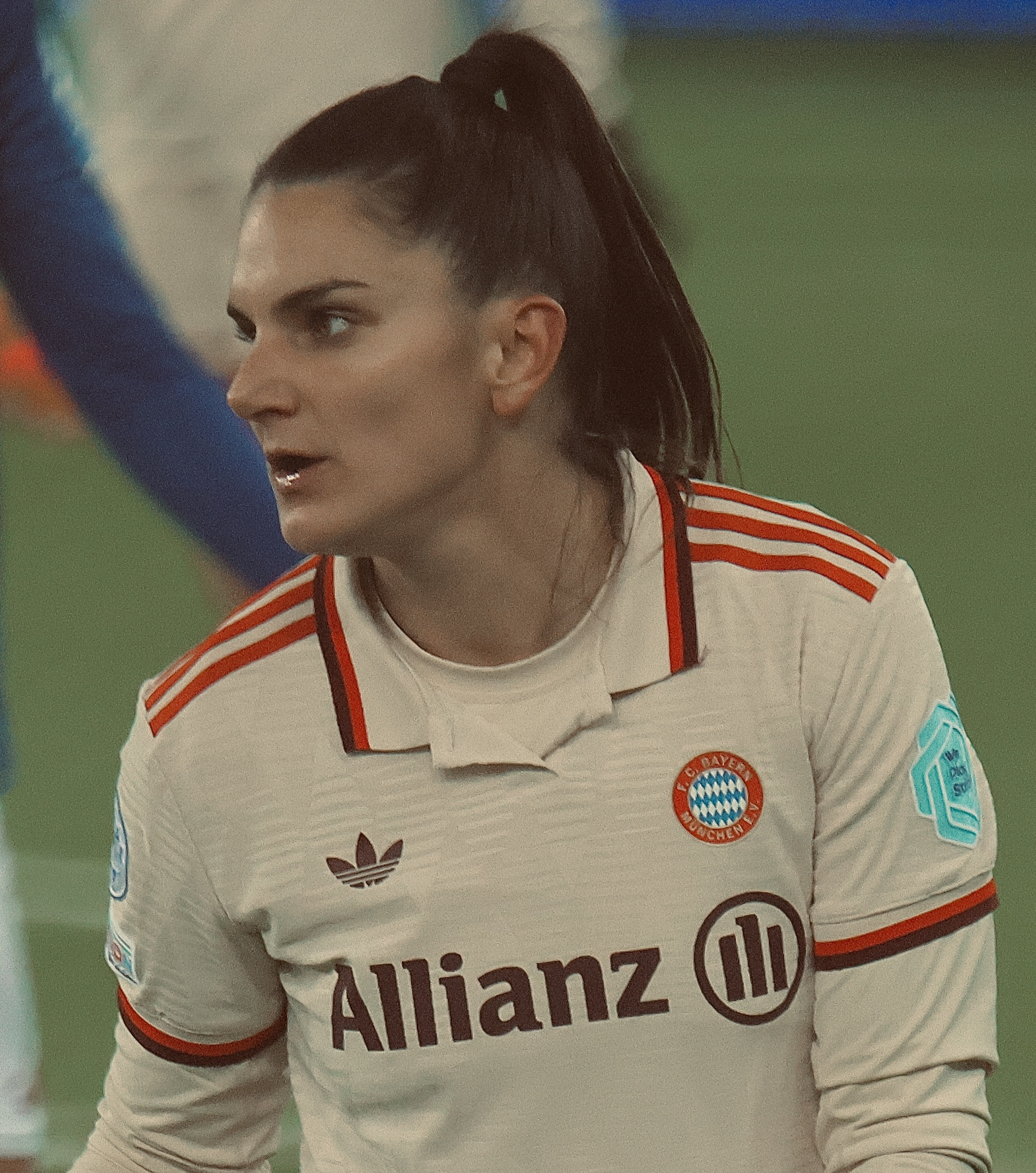
- Damnjanović with Bayern Munich in 2024

Personal information
- Full name: Jovana Damnjanović
- Date of birth: 24 November 1994 (age 31)
- Place of birth: Belgrade, FR Yugoslavia
- Height: 1.70 m (5 ft 7 in)
- Position: Forward

Team information
- Current team: Bayern Munich
- Number: 9

Senior career*
Years	Team	Apps	(Gls)
- FC Perspektiva
–2013	ŽFK Crvena zvezda		
2013–2015	VfL Wolfsburg	13	(3)
2013–2015	VfL Wolfsburg II	9	(4)
2015–2017	SC Sand	32	(8)
2017–	Bayern Munich	131	(46)
2018	Bayern Munich II	1	(0)

International career
2008–2010	Serbia U17	8	(7)
2010–2014	Serbia U19	20	(22)
2010–	Serbia	54	(20)
- * Club domestic league appearances and goals as of 14 November 2026

Jovana Damnjanović (Serbian Cyrillic: Јована Дамњановић; born 24 November 1994) is a Serbian footballer who plays as a forward for the Serbia national team and Bayern Munich in the German Bundesliga.

== Club career ==
Damnjanović, who played football for FC Perspektiva in her youth, later moved to first division club ŽFK Crvena zvezda. At the end of the 2012/13 season, she and her team reached second place in the Serbian Super League, the highest division in Serbian football. In 2012 she and her team reached the cup final, achieving second place after a 1–2 loss after extra time against ŽFK Spartak Subotica.

In the summer of 2013, she was signed by Bundesliga club VfL Wolfsburg. On 7 September 2013 (1st matchday) she made her debut in the Bundesliga in the 1–1 draw in the home game against FC Bayern Munich, coming on as a substitute for Martina Müller in the 73rd minute. With VfL Wolfsburg she won 2013–14 UEFA Champions League and became the first Serbian women's player to achieve this feat.

After two seasons, she moved to league rivals SC Sand in the summer of 2015.

On 10 March 2017 she signed a 3-year contract with German champions Bayern Munich. She made her debut for Bayern Munich on 5 November 2017 (7th matchday) in a 3–1 win in the home game against MSV Duisburg, coming on as a substitute for Lucie Voňková in the 62nd minute. In August 2024, Damnjanovic extended her contract with Bayern Munich for a fourth time and signed a new deal until 30 June 2027.

== International career ==
On 23 February 2010, she made her debut at the age of 15 in the A national team in a test international match against the Hungary selection, which resulted in a 1–0 loss. She was replaced in the 57th minute.

Damnjanović participated in the UEFA Women's Under-19 Championship held in Turkey from 2 to 14 July 2012. Despite her best efforts, her team was eliminated from the tournament after the preliminary round. In qualifying for the 2013 European Women's Under-19 Football Championship, she had the honour of being the top scorer with 14 goals. However, she was unable to qualify with her team for the final round..

== Personal life ==
The footballer Jelena Čanković is Damnjanović's first cousin.

== International goals ==
No.	Date	Venue	Opponent	Score	Result	Competition
1.	13 February 2014	Ta' Qali National Stadium, Ta' Qali, Malta	Malta	1–0	3–0	2015 FIFA Women's World Cup qualification
2.	30 November 2015	Den Dreef, Leuven, Belgium	Belgium	1–1	1–1	UEFA Women's Euro 2017 qualifying
3.	25 November 2021	Serbian FA Sports Center, Stara Pazova, Serbia	Bulgaria	1–0	3–0	2023 FIFA Women's World Cup qualification
4.	25 November 2021	Serbian FA Sports Center, Stara Pazova, Serbia	Bulgaria	2–0	3–0	2023 FIFA Women's World Cup qualification
5.	30 November 2021	Stadion Plovdiv, Plovdiv, Bulgaria	Bulgaria	3–0	4–1	2023 FIFA Women's World Cup qualification
6.	30 November 2021	Stadion Plovdiv, Plovdiv, Bulgaria	Bulgaria	4–1	4–1	2023 FIFA Women's World Cup qualification
7.	17 February 2022	Titanic Deluxe Golf Belek, Belek, Turkey	Bosnia and Herzegovina	1–0	1–0	Friendly
8.	23 February 2022	Gürsel Aksel Stadium, İzmir, Turkey	Turkey	2–0	5–2	2023 FIFA Women's World Cup qualification
9.	7 April 2022	Serbian FA Sports Center, Stara Pazova, Serbia	Israel	1–0	4–0	2023 FIFA Women's World Cup qualification
10.	12 April 2022	Serbian FA Sports Center, Stara Pazova, Serbia	Germany	2–0	3–2	2023 FIFA Women's World Cup qualification
11.	12 April 2022	Serbian FA Sports Center, Stara Pazova, Serbia	Germany	3–1	3–2	2023 FIFA Women's World Cup qualification
12.	14 July 2023	Matija Gubec Stadium, Krško, Slovenia	Slovenia	1–0	3–0	Friendly
13.	26 September 2023	Serbian FA Sports Center, Stara Pazova, Serbia	Greece	2–0	4–0	2023–24 UEFA Women's Nations League
14.	26 September 2023	Serbian FA Sports Center, Stara Pazova, Serbia	Greece	4–0	4–0	2023–24 UEFA Women's Nations League
15.	27 October 2023	Stadion Miejski, Tychy, Poland	Poland	1–2	1–2	2023–24 UEFA Women's Nations League
16.	9 April 2024	Ménfői úti Stadion, Győr, Hungary	Israel	1–0	4–2	UEFA Women's Euro 2025 qualifying
17.	9 April 2024	Ménfői úti Stadion, Győr, Hungary	Israel	3–1	4–2	UEFA Women's Euro 2025 qualifying
18.	4 June 2024	Anton Malatinský Stadium, Trnava, Slovakia	Slovakia	1–0	4–0	UEFA Women's Euro 2025 qualifying
19.	21 February 2025	Serbian FA Sports Center, Stara Pazova, Serbia	Finland	1–0	1–0	2025 UEFA Women's Nations League
20.	28 November 2025	Mardan Sports Complex, Antalya, Turkey	Czech Republic	1–0	1–0	Friendly

== Honours ==
VfL Wolfsburg

- UEFA Champions League: 2013–14
- Bundesliga: 2013–14
- DFB-Pokal: 2014–15

Bayern Munich

- Bundesliga: 2020–21, 2022–23, 2023–24, 2024–25, 2025–26
- DFB-Pokal: 2024–25, 2025–26
- DFB-Supercup: 2024, 2025, 2026

== Career statistics ==
=== Club ===
As of match played 19 November 2026

Club	Season	Division	League		DFB Pokal		Continental (Note: Includes UEFA Women's Champions League)		Other (Note: Includes DFB-Supercup)		Total	
Club	Season	Division	Apps	Goals	Apps	Goals	Apps	Goals	Apps	Goals	Apps	Goals
VfL Wolfsburg	2013–14	Frauen-Bundesliga	10	3	1	1	3	2			14	6
VfL Wolfsburg	2014–15	Frauen-Bundesliga	3	0	2	4	1	0			6	4
VfL Wolfsburg	Total		13	3	3	5	4	2			20	10
VfL Wolfsburg II	2013–14	2. Bundesliga Nord	2	0							2	0
VfL Wolfsburg II	2014-15	2. Bundesliga Nord	7	4							7	4
VfL Wolfsburg II	Total		9	4							9	4
SC Sand	2015-16	Frauen-Bundesliga	19	6	4	5					23	11
SC Sand	2016-17	Frauen-Bundesliga	13	2	4	2					17	4
SC Sand	Total		32	8	8	7					40	15
SC Sand II	2015-16	Regionaliga Süd	1	0							1	0
Bayern Munich	2017–18	Frauen-Bundesliga	3	2	1	0					4	2
Bayern Munich	2018–19	Frauen-Bundesliga	14	5	3	2	6	2			23	9
Bayern Munich	2019–20	Frauen-Bundesliga	21	11	2	1	4	1			27	13
Bayern Munich	2021–22	Frauen-Bundesliga	17	6	4	6	7	3			28	15
Bayern Munich	2022–23	Frauen-Bundesliga	17	3	2	0	6	0			25	3
Bayern Munich	2023–24	Frauen-Bundesliga	21	8	5	4	6	1			32	13
Bayern Munich	2024–25	Frauen-Bundesliga	17	2	5	3	6	2	1	0	29	7
Bayern Munich	2025–26	Frauen-Bundesliga	15	7	2	0	4	1	1	1	22	9
Bayern Munich	2026–27	Frauen-Bundesliga	6	2	2	0	4	0	1	1	14	3
Bayern Munich	Total		131	47	28	17	44	10	3	2	204	74
Bayern Munich II	2017–18	2. Bundesliga Süd	1	0							1	0
Total career			187	61	39	29	48	12	3	2	275	103
