= Stine Ballisager =

Danish footballer (born 1994)

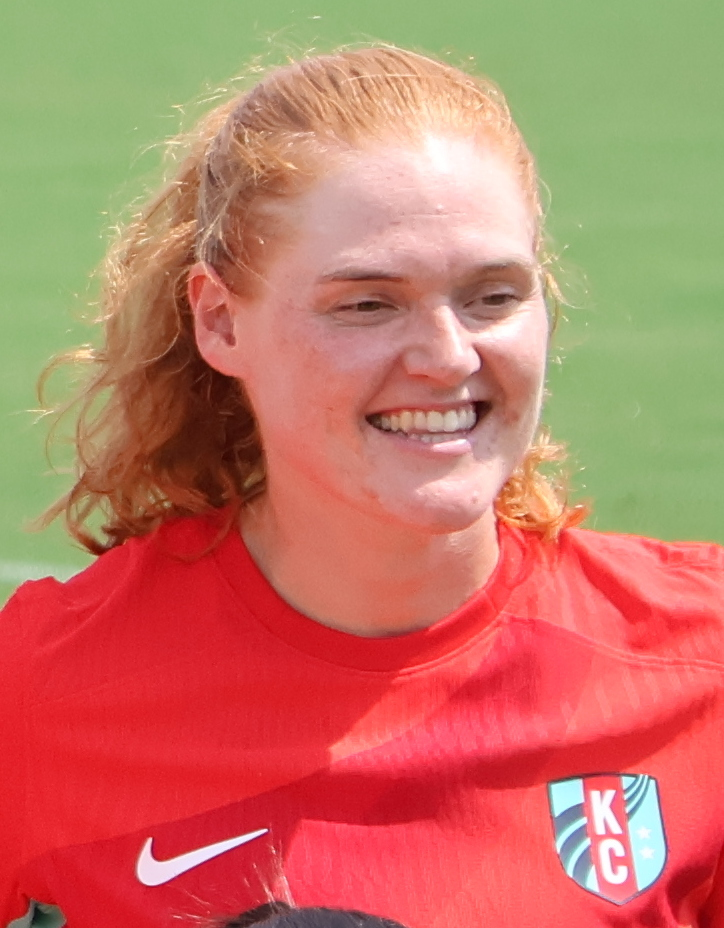
- Ballisager with the Kansas City Current in 2024

Personal information
- Full name: Stine Ballisager Pedersen
- Date of birth: 3 January 1994 (age 32)
- Place of birth: Vellev, Denmark
- Height: 1.71 m (5 ft 7 in)
- Position: Defender

Team information
- Current team: Bayern Munich
- Number: 3

Youth career
- –2009: Vellev
- 2009–2012: Team Viborg

Senior career*
Years	Team	Apps	(Gls)
2012–2017	IK Skovbakken		
2017–2018	VSK Aarhus	14	(2)
2018–2023	Vålerenga	127	(3)
2023–2024	Kansas City Current	22	(1)
2025	Fiorentina	13	(0)
2025–	Bayern Munich	24	(1)

International career^{‡}
2009–2010	Denmark U16	8	(0)
2009–2011	Denmark U17	24	(0)
2011–2013	Denmark U19	29	(2)
2016	Denmark U23	2	(0)
2012–	Denmark	83	(4)
Medal record
Women's football
Representing Denmark
UEFA Women's Championship
Silver medal – second place	2017 Netherlands	Team
- * Club domestic league appearances and goals as of 14 November 2026 ‡ National team caps and goals as of 12 October 2026

Stine Ballisager Pedersen (born 3 January 1994) is a Danish professional footballer who plays as a defender for the German club Bayern Munich and the Denmark national team.

== Club career ==
Ballisager started playing football at six years old. She played youth soccer for Vellev IF, and then for Team Viborg. In 2012, she signed with IK Skovbakken.

=== Vålerenga, 2018–2023 ===
Ballisager signed with Vålerenga before the 2018 Toppserien, and the club named her captain in the 2021 season. She made 140 total appearances for the club across all competitions.

=== Kansas City Current, 2023–2024 ===
On 3 July 2023, American club Kansas City Current of the National Women's Soccer League announced that they had signed Ballisager through the 2024 season, with an option for an additional year, and that she would join the team following the 2023 FIFA Women's World Cup. With six months remaining on her contract, Vålerenga transferred her for an undisclosed fee but stated that it was the largest in club history.

On 19 December 2024, the Kansas City Current announced that Ballisager had departed the club.

=== Fiorentina, 2025 ===
In January 2025 she signed with Fiorentina till June 2026.

=== Bayern Munich, 2025– ===
On 19 May 2025, Ballisager signed a contract with FC Bayern Munich until 2027. Her Bundesliga debut took place on 14 September 2025, in a 3–0 away win against RB Leipzig, where she started the match. She scored her first Bundesliga goal on 19 October 2025, in a 5–1 home win against 1. FC Köln, making it 4–1 in the 71st minute. On 8 April 2026, she extended her contract early until 30 June 2028. The 2025/26 season was very successful for Ballisager. In August, she won with the Supercup her first title with Bayern and scored her first Bundesliga goal on Matchday 7 against FC Köln. At the end of the season, she won the German Championship decisively with FC Bayern, finishing 16 points ahead of VfL Wolfsburg and the DFB Cup was also won against the same opponent.

== International career ==
Ballisager played for several youth Danish national teams. In 2012, she debuted for the senior national team in a match against Brazil. She was also part of the team which represented Denmark at the UEFA Women's Euro 2017, where they reached the competition final for the first time in history, but eventually lost to the Netherlands.

Since October 2023, she is vice-captain for the national team.

On 20 June 2025, Ballisager was called up to the Danish squad for the UEFA Women's Euro 2025.

== Career statistics ==
=== International ===
Scores and results list Denmark's goal tally first, score column indicates score after each Ballisager goal.

List of international goals scored by Stine Ballisager
No.	Date	Venue	Opponent	Score	Result	Competition
1	4 October 2019	Viborg Stadium, Viborg, Denmark	Bosnia and Herzegovina	1–0	2–0	UEFA Women's Euro 2022 qualifying
2	10 March 2020	Lagos Municipal Stadium, Lagos, Portugal	Belgium	4–0	4–0	2020 Algarve Cup
3	1 September 2022	Viborg Stadium, Viborg, Denmark	Montenegro	3–1	5–1	2023 FIFA Women's World Cup qualification
4	5 April 2024	Městský fotbalový stadion, Uherské Hradiště, Czech Republic	Czech Republic	2–1	3–1	UEFA Women's Euro 2025 qualifying

== Honours ==
Vålerenga

- Toppserien: 2020
- Norwegian Women's Cup: 2020, 2021

Bayern Munich

- Bundesliga: 2025–26
- DFB-Pokal: 2025–26
- DFB-Supercup Frauen: 2025, 2026

Denmark

- UEFA Women's Euro runner-up: 2017
- Tournoi de France runner -up: 2023

Individual

- Talent of the Year: 2013
- Danish Women's Football Player of the Year: 2022
