= Anna Klink =

German football player

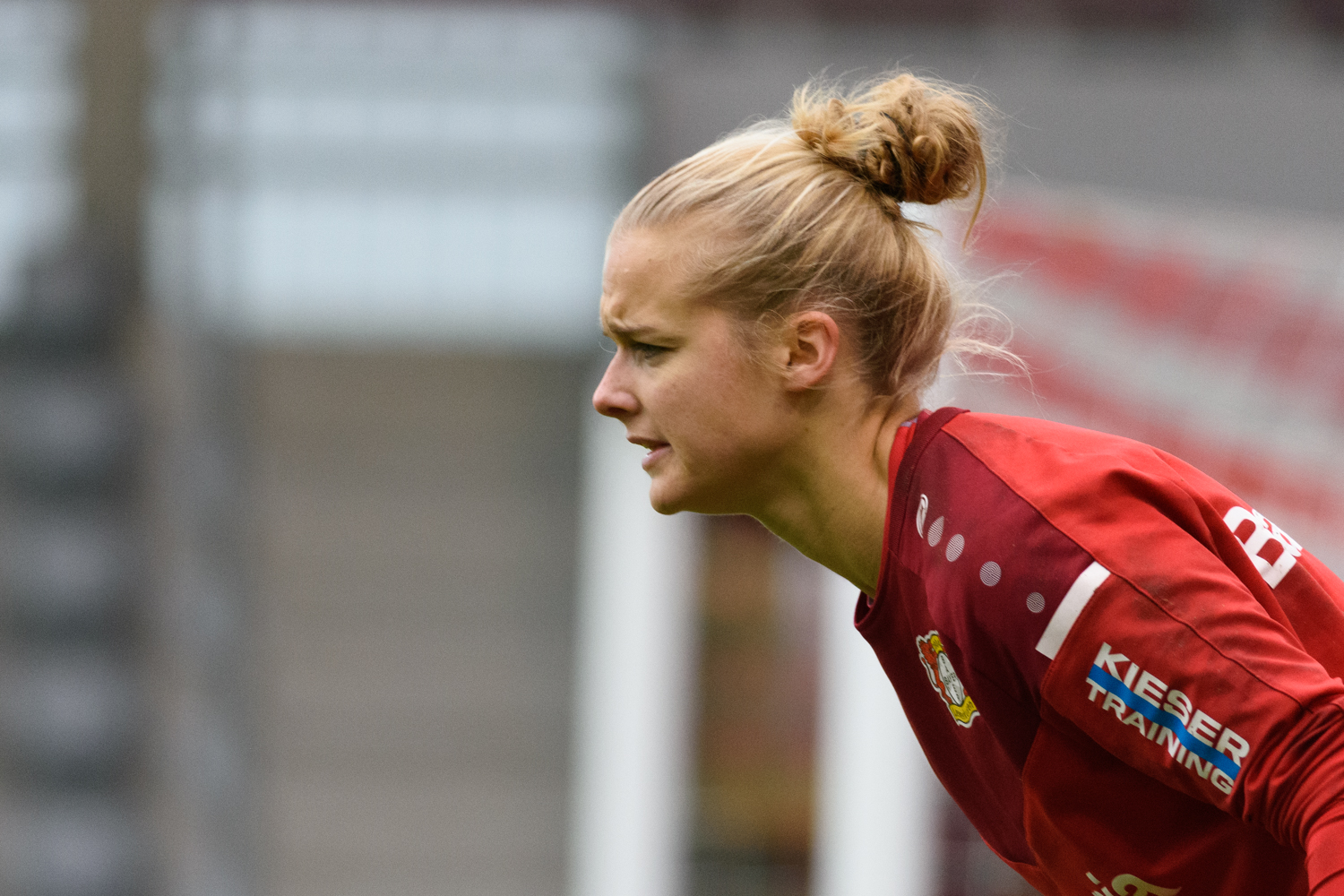

Personal information
- Date of birth: 22 March 1995 (age 31)
- Place of birth: Engelskirchen, Germany
- Height: 1.75 m (5 ft 9 in)
- Position: Goalkeeper

Team information
- Current team: Bayern Munich
- Number: 38

Senior career*
Years	Team	Apps	(Gls)
2011–2023	Bayer Leverkusen	158	(0)
2023–2025	Basel	33	(0)
2025–	Bayern Munich	0	(0)
2025–	Bayern Munich II	2	(0)

International career
2011	Germany U16	1	(0)
- * Club domestic league appearances and goals as of 16:06, 15 February 2026 (UTC)

Anna Klink (born 22 March 1995) is a German footballer who plays as a goalkeeper for Frauen-Bundesliga club Bayern Munich.

== Club career ==
Klink played in eleven seasons from 2011–12 to 2023–24 for Bundesliga club Bayer Leverkusen.

In summer 2023, Klink moved to Swiss Women's Super League club FC Basel.

Klink signed a two-year contract with Bayern Munich in June 2025.
