= Sarah Mattner-Trembleau =

German footballer (born 2003)

Personal information
- Date of birth: 11 May 2003 (age 23)
- Place of birth: Vienna, Austria
- Height: 1.66 m (5 ft 5 in)
- Position: Forward

Team information
- Current team: Bayern Munich
- Number: 11

Youth career
- First Vienna FC

Senior career*
Years	Team	Apps	(Gls)
2017–2022	First Vienna FC	66	(52)
2023–2026	SKN St. Pölten	59	(30)
2026–	Bayern Munich	8	(0)

International career^{‡}
2019	Germany U16	4	(2)
2019–2020	Germany U17	5	(1)
2022	Germany U19	4	(4)
2022	Germany U20	3	(0)
2025–	Germany U23	9	(0)
- * Club domestic league appearances and goals as of 14 November 2026 ‡ National team caps and goals as of 15 October 2026

Sarah Mattner-Trembleau (born 11 May 2003) is a professional footballer who plays as a forward for Bundesliga club Bayern Munich. Born in Austria, she is a Germany youth international.

== Early life ==
Mattner-Trembleau was born to a French mother and a German father in Vienna, Austria, on 11 May 2003.

== Club career ==
Mattner-Trembleau started her career with Austrian side First Vienna FC. Following her stint there, she signed for Austrian side SKN St. Pölten, helping the club win the league title.

In the 2025–26 season with SKN St. Pölten, Mattner-Trembleau scored 16 goals in 16 league games.

On 16 June 2026, Mattner-Trembleau signed for Bundesliga club Bayern Munich until 2029.

== International career ==
Mattner-Trembleau is an Germany youth international. During the summer of 2022, she played for the Germany women's national under-19 football team at the 2022 UEFA European Under-19 Championship.

== Career statistics ==
=== Club ===
As of match played 19 November 2026:

Appearances and goals by club, season and competition
Club	Season	League			National Cup (Note: Includes ÖFB Frauen Cup, DFB-Pokal Frauen)		Continental		Other		Total	
Club	Season	Division	Apps	Goals	Apps	Goals	Apps	Goals	Apps	Goals	Apps	Goals
First Vienna FC	2017–18	Wiener Frauen Landesliga	7	6	2	2			2	1 (Note: Appearance in the Relegation)	11	9
First Vienna FC	2018–19	ÖFB Frauen 2. Liga Ost/Süd	17	17	2	1					19	18
First Vienna FC	2019–20	ÖFB Frauen 2. Liga	9	4	1	0					10	4
First Vienna FC	2020–21	ÖFB Frauen 2. Liga	13	12	0	0					13	12
First Vienna FC	2021–22	ÖFB Frauen Bundesliga	15	12	1	0					16	12
First Vienna FC	2022–23	ÖFB Frauen Bundesliga	5	1	1	0					6	1
First Vienna FC	Total		66	52	7	3	0	0	2	1	75	56
SKN St. Pölten	2022–23	ÖFB Frauen Bundesliga	9	6	3	2					12	8
SKN St. Pölten	2023–24	ÖFB Frauen Bundesliga	17	6	5	2	9	2 (Note: Appearances in UEFA Women's Champions League)			31	10
SKN St. Pölten	2024–25	ÖFB Frauen Bundesliga	17	2	3	3	9	0			29	5
SKN St. Pölten	2025–26	ÖFB Frauen Bundesliga	16	16	1	1	3	1			20	18
SKN St. Pölten	Total		59	30	12	8	21	3	0	0	92	41
Bayern Munich	2026–27	Frauen-Bundesliga	8	0	2	0	1	0	0	0	11	0
Career Total			133	82	21	11	22	3	2	1	178	97

== Honours ==
First Vienna FC

- ÖFB-Frauen Bundesliga 2: 2020–21

SKN St. Pölten

- ÖFB-Frauen Bundesliga: 2022–23, 2023–24, 2024–25
- ÖFB-Frauen Cup: 2022–23, 2023–24, 2024–25

Individual

- Fritz Walter Medal U19 Bronze: 2022
