= Regina van Eijk =

Dutch footballer (born 2002)

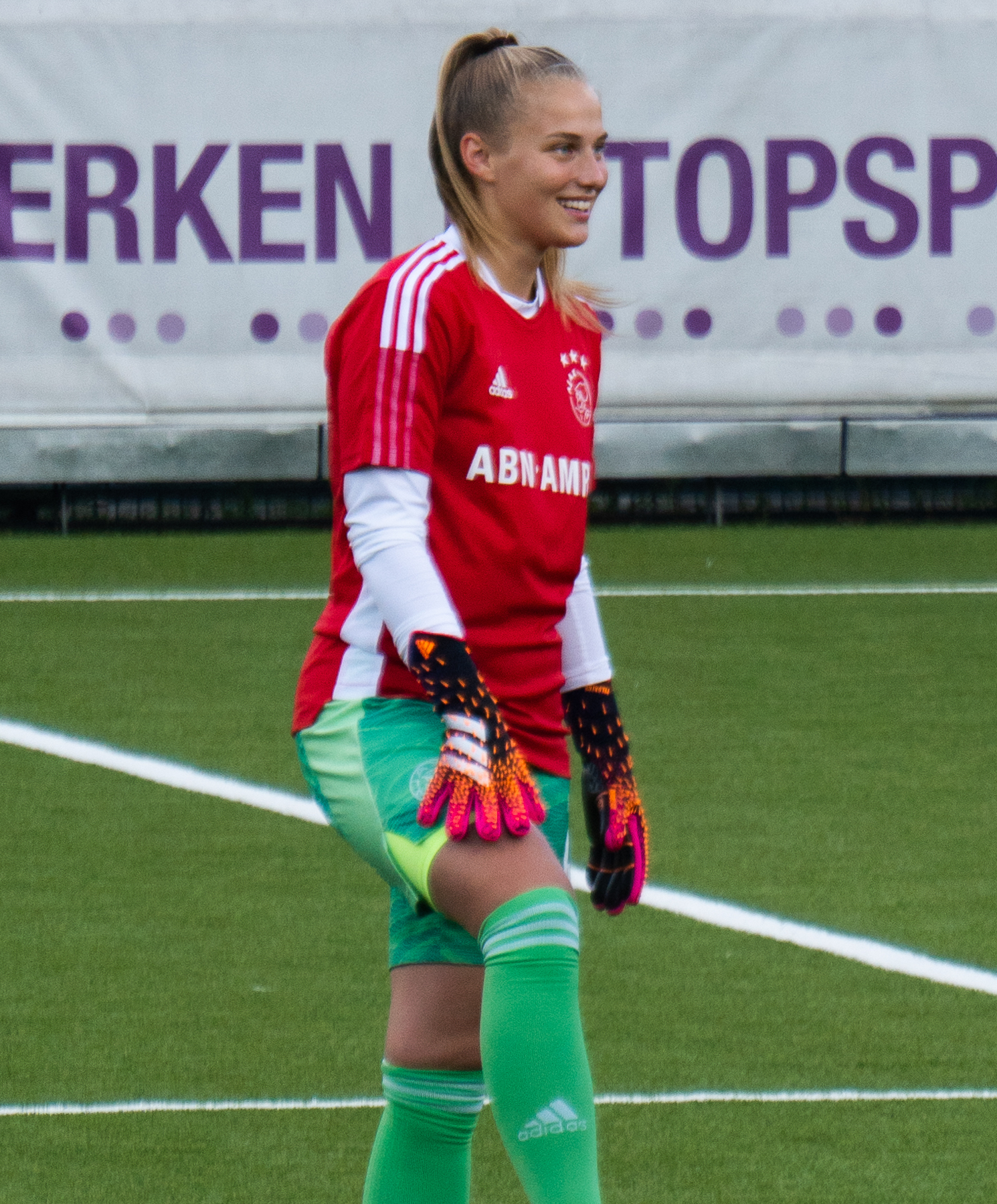
- Van Eijk with Ajax in 2021

Personal information
- Full name: Regina Maria Juliana van Eijk
- Date of birth: 9 March 2002 (age 24)
- Place of birth: Woerden, Netherlands
- Position: Goalkeeper

Team information
- Current team: Bayern Munich
- Number: 22

Youth career
- SC Woerden
- CTO Amsterdam
- 2018–2021: Ajax

Senior career*
Years	Team	Apps	(Gls)
2021–2026	Ajax	84	(0)
2026–	Bayern Munich	1	(0)

International career^{‡}
2017	Netherlands U15	3	(0)
2018	Netherlands U16	3	(0)
2020	Netherlands U18	1	(0)
2020	Netherlands U19	1	(0)
2024–	Netherlands U23	10	(0)
- * Club domestic league appearances and goals as of 20:55, 6 November 2026 (UTC) ‡ National team caps and goals as of 17 April 2026

Regina Maria Juliana van Eijk (born 9 March 2002) is a Dutch professional footballer who plays as a goalkeeper for Frauen-Bundesliga club Bayern Munich.

In 2021, she was seen as one of the most promising Netherlands youth prospects.

== Club career ==
Van Eijk started the 2021–22 season as Ajax's third choice goalkeeper, behind Lize Kop and Isa Pothof, but both of them suffered injuries. This led to Van Eijk making her league debut against VV Alkmaar on 8 October 2021. On 2 March 2022, she signed a new contract with the club. On 22 June 2023, it was announced she had signed a one-year contract extension. She won the NOS Sport Award 'Viral of the Year' after she made a sharp observation about Rafael van der Vaart's comments. In the summer of 2024, she signed a three-year contract extension with Ajax.

On 11 June 2026, van Eijk signed for Bundesliga club Bayern Munich until 2029.

== International career ==
Van Eijk has represented Netherlands at different youth levels. In April 2025, she received her first call-up to the Netherlands national team as a replacement for injured Daphne van Domselaar.

== Personal life ==
Born in the Netherlands, van Eijk is of Hungarian descent through her mother.

== Career statistics ==
=== Club ===
As of match played 6 November 2026:

Appearances and goals by club, season and competition
Club	Season	League			National Cup (Note: Includes KNVB Women's Cup and DFB-Pokal)		Continental		Other		Total	
Club	Season	Division	Apps	Goals	Apps	Goals	Apps	Goals	Apps	Goals	Apps	Goals
Ajax	2021–22	Vrouwen Eredivisie	19	0	3	0	0	0	2	0 (Note: Appearances in Eredivisie Cup)	24	0
Ajax	2021–22	Vrouwen Eredivisie	0	0	0	0	0	0	0	0	0	0
Ajax	2023–24	Vrouwen Eredivisie	21	0	4	0	11	0 (Note: Appearances in UEFA Women's Champions League)	1	0 (Note: Appearances in KNVB Women's Super Cup)	37	0
Ajax	2024–25	Vrouwen Eredivisie	22	0	0	0	2	0	1	0	25	0
Ajax	2025–26	Vrouwen Eredivisie	22	0	0	0	6	0 (Note: Appearances in UEFA Women's Europa Cup)			28	0
Ajax	Total		84	0	7	0	19	0	4	0	114	0
Bayern Munich	2026–27	Frauen-Bundesliga	1	0	1	0	0	0	0	0	2	0
Career Total			85	0	8	0	19	0	4	0	116	0
