= Bernadette Kakounan =

Ivorian footballer (born 1997)

Bernadette Amani
Personal information
- Full name: Bernadette Amani Kakounan
- Date of birth: 4 September 1997 (age 29)
- Place of birth: Dougbafla, Oumé, Ivory Coast
- Height: 1.64 m (5 ft 5 in)
- Position: Midfielder

Team information
- Current team: Bayern Munich
- Number: 15

Senior career*
Years	Team	Apps	(Gls)
2019–2020	Extremadura	1	(0)
2020–2021	Friol	16	(0)
2021–2022	La Solana	28	(4)
2022–2023	DUX Logroño		
2023–2025	Eibar	49	(0)
2025	CD Tenerife	13	(1)
2026–	Bayern Munich	17	(2)

International career^{‡}
	Ivory Coast	1+	(0+)
- * Club domestic league appearances and goals as of 14 November 2026 ‡ National team caps and goals as of 10 May 2019

Bernadette Amani Kakounan (born 4 September 1997) is an Ivorian professional footballer who plays as a midfielder for Frauen-Bundesliga club Bayern Munich and the Ivory Coast national team.

== Club career ==
Kakounan signed with Spanish Primera Nacional club Extremadura UD on 29 September 2019.

== Honours ==
Bayern Munich

- Bundesliga: 2025–26
- DFB-Pokal: 2025–26

== See also ==
- List of Ivory Coast women's international footballers
