= FC Bayern Munich (women) =

Women's football team of the German sports club

Bayern Munich
- Full name: FC Bayern München
- Founded: 7 June 1970; 56 years ago
- Ground: FC Bayern Campus; Sportpark Unterhaching (select games)
- Capacity: 2,500 / 15,000
- President: Herbert Hainer
- General manager: Bianca Rech
- Head coach: José Barcala
- League: Bundesliga
- 2025–26: Bundesliga, 1st of 14 (champions)
- Website: fcbayern.com/women
Home colours	Away colours	Third colours

FC Bayern Munich is a German professional women's football team based in Munich, Germany. The club was founded in 1970 and plays in the Frauen-Bundesliga, the top women's league in Germany. Bayern Munich Women were a founding member of the Frauen-Bundesliga in 1990. They have won seven German league titles and were twice DFB-Pokal winners.

== History ==
Bayern's women's football team was officially founded in 1970 although women had been playing at the club since 1967. However, because the DFB had outlawed women's football from 1955 to 1970 Bayern could only officially register the team in 1970. They won their first national championship in 1976. In 1990 Bayern were founding members of the Frauen-Bundesliga, but they were relegated after next season.

The club returned to the Bundesliga in 2000. In 2009, Bayern were runners-up in the Bundesliga, trailing champion Turbine Potsdam by a single goal. In the 2011–12 season on 12 May 2012, FC Bayern Munich dethroned the German Cup title holders 1. FFC Frankfurt with a 2–0 in the 2011–12 final in Cologne and celebrated the biggest success of the club's history since winning the championship in 1976. In 2015 they won the Bundesliga for the first time, without any defeat. They won the 2015–16 Bundesliga, for the second time in a row.

In May 2023, Bayern Munich celebrated a double championship when both the women's team and the men's team won the top national football leagues within 2 days. An 11–1 win over Turbine Potsdam on the final day of the season secured the FCB women their fourth Bundesliga championship and their fifth national championship overall, marking the club's biggest win in history.

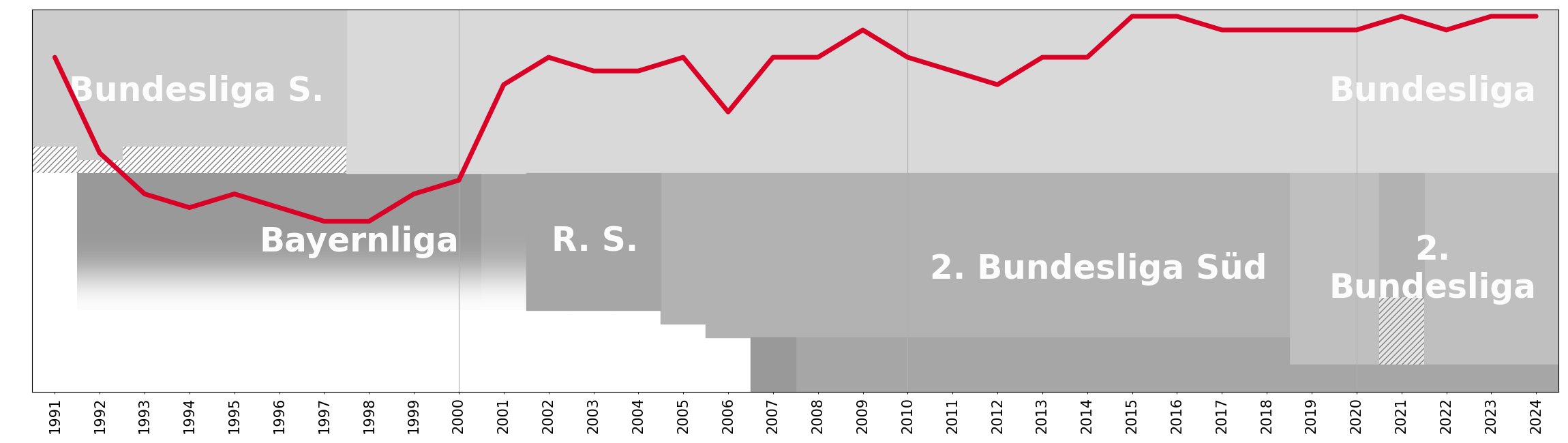
Historical league performance of Bayern Munich

== Players ==
=== First-team squad ===
As of 8 July 2026

Note: Flags indicate national team as defined under FIFA eligibility rules; some limited exceptions apply. Players may hold more than one non-FIFA nationality.

No.	Pos.	Nation	Player
1	GK	GER	Ena Mahmutovic
2	DF	CAN	Vanessa Gilles
3	DF	DEN	Stine Ballisager
4	DF	ISL	Glódís Perla Viggósdóttir (captain)
5	DF	SWE	Magdalena Eriksson
6	FW	GER	Kassandra Potsi
7	DF	GER	Giulia Gwinn
8	MF	GER	Lena Oberdorf
9	FW	SRB	Jovana Damnjanović
10	MF	GER	Linda Dallmann
11	DF	GER	Sarah Mattner-Trembleau
14	MF	GER	Alara Şehitler

No.	Pos.	Nation	Player
15	MF	CIV	Bernadette Amani
17	FW	GER	Klara Bühl
18	MF	JPN	Momoko Tanikawa
19	DF	AUT	Katharina Naschenweng
20	DF	GER	Franziska Kett
21	FW	DEN	Pernille Harder
22	GK	NED	Regina van Eijk
23	MF	NED	Sophie Proost
25	MF	AUT	Sarah Zadrazil (vice-captain)
28	MF	AUT	Barbara Dunst
29	FW	ESP	Edna Imade
38	GK	GER	Anna Klink

==== Out on loan ====
Note: Flags indicate national team as defined under FIFA eligibility rules; some limited exceptions apply. Players may hold more than one non-FIFA nationality.

No.	Pos.	Nation	Player
—	GK	GER	Anna Wellmann (on loan at Eibar until 30 June 2027)
—	DF	GER	Luzie Zähringer (on loan at VfB Stuttgart until 30 June 2027)
—	MF	GER	Marie Gmeineder (on loan at Werder Bremen until 30 June 2027)

=== Reserves ===
Bayern II, the women's reserves team, have played in the newly formed 2. Frauen-Bundesliga since 2018. They are managed by Nathalie Bischof.

Bayern II won the 2008–09 Regionalliga (Süd) and the 2001–02 Bavarian Cup. The team played in the Second Bundesliga (Süd) from 2009 to 2010 to 2018.

=== Former players ===
For notable current and former players, see Category:FC Bayern Munich (women) players.

== Honours ==
=== Domestic ===
- German Championship: 1976
- Frauen-Bundesliga:
  - Winners: 2014–15, 2015–16, 2020–21, 2022–23, 2023–24, 2024–25, 2025–26
- DFB-Pokal:
  - Winners: 2011–2012, 2024–2025, 2025–2026
- DFB-Supercup:
  - Winners: 2024, 2025, 2026
- Bundesliga Cup: 2003, 2011

=== Regional ===
- Bavarian women's football championship (21): 1972–1990 (19 consecutive), 2000, 2004
- Bavarian cup: 1982, 1984, 1985, 1986, 1987, 1988, 1989, 1990

=== Invitational ===
- Valais Cup: 2015
- World Sevens Football Tournament: 2025

== Record in UEFA Women's Champions League ==
Bayern Munich have set a few international records in their campaign to qualify for the 2009–10 UEFA Women's Champions League:

- Most goals scored throughout an UEFA Women's Champions League group stage: 32 (2009–10)
- Best goal difference throughout an UEFA Women's Champions League group stage: +30 (2009–10)

All results (away, home and aggregate) list Bayern Munich's goal tally first.

Season	Round	Opponents	Away	Home	Aggregate
2009–10	Qualifying round	(Scotland) Glasgow City	5–2	–	–
2009–10	Qualifying round	(Georgia (country)) Norchi Dinamoeli Tbilisi	19–0	–	–
2009–10	Qualifying round	(Lithuania) Gintra Universitetas (Host)	8–0	–	–
2009–10	Round of 32	(Hungary) Viktória Szombathely	5–0 ^{f}	4–2	9–2
2009–10	Round of 16	(France) Montpellier	0–0 ^{f}	0–1 (a.e.t.)	0–1
2015–16	Round of 32	(Netherlands) Twente	1–1 ^{f}	2–2	3–3 (a)
2016–17	Round of 32	(Scotland) Hibernian	6–0 ^{f}	4–1	10–1
2016–17	Round of 16	(Russia) Rossiyanka	4–0	4–0 ^{f}	8–0
2016–17	Quarter-finals	(France) Paris Saint-Germain	0–4	1–0 ^{f}	1–4
2017–18	Round of 32	(England) Chelsea	0–1 ^{f}	2–1	2–2 (a)
2018–19	Round of 32	(Serbia) Spartak Subotica	7–0 ^{f}	4–0	11–0
2018–19	Round of 16	(Switzerland) FC Zürich	2–0 ^{f}	3–0	5–0
2018–19	Quarter-finals	(Czech Republic) Slavia Prague	1–1 ^{f}	5–1	6–2
2018–19	Semi-finals	(Spain) Barcelona	0–1	0–1 ^{f}	0–2
2019–20	Round of 32	(Sweden) Kopparbergs/Göteborg	2–1 ^{f}	0–1	2–2 (a)
2019–20	Round of 16	(Kazakhstan) BIIK Kazygurt	5–0 ^{f}	2–0	7–0
2019–20	Quarter-finals	(France) Lyon	1–2		
2020–21	Round of 32	(Netherlands) Ajax	3–1 ^{f}	3–0	6–1
2020–21	Round of 16	(Kazakhstan) BIIK Kazygurt	6–1 ^{f}	3–0	9–1
2020–21	Quarter-finals	(Sweden) FC Rosengård	1–0	3–0 ^{f}	4–0
2020–21	Semi-finals	(England) Chelsea	1–4	2–1 ^{f}	3–5
2021–22	Group stage	(Portugal) Benfica	0–0 ^{f}	4–0	2nd
2021–22	Group stage	(Sweden) BK Häcken	4–0 ^{f}	5–1	2nd
2021–22	Group stage	(France) Lyon	1–2 ^{f}	1–0	2nd
2021–22	Quarter-finals	(France) Paris Saint-Germain	2–2 (a.e.t.)	1–2 ^{f}	3–4
2022–23	Qualifying round 2	(Spain) Real Sociedad	1–0 ^{f}	3–1	4–1
2022–23	Group stage	(Spain) Barcelona	0–3 ^{f}	3–1	2nd
2022–23	Group stage	(Portugal) Benfica	3–2 ^{f}	2–0	2nd
2022–23	Group stage	(Sweden) Rosengård	4–0	2–1 ^{f}	2nd
2022–23	Quarter-finals	(England) Arsenal	0–2	1–0 ^{f}	1–2
2023–24	Group stage	(Netherlands) Ajax	0–1	1–1 ^{f}	3rd
2023–24	Group stage	(France) Paris Saint-Germain	1–0 ^{f}	2–2	3rd
2023–24	Group stage	(Italy) Roma	2–2	2–2 ^{f}	3rd
2024–25	Group stage	(England) Arsenal	2–3	5–2 ^{f}	2nd
2024–25	Group stage	(Italy) Juventus	2–0 ^{f}	4–0	2nd
2024–25	Group stage	(Norway) Vålerenga	1–1	3–0 ^{f}	2nd
2024–25	Quarter-finals	(France) Lyon	1–4	0–2 ^{f}	1–6
2025–26	League phase	(Spain) Barcelona	1–7	—N/a	4th
2025–26	League phase	(Italy) Juventus	—N/a	2–1	4th
2025–26	League phase	(England) Arsenal	—N/a	3–2	4th
2025–26	League phase	(France) Paris Saint-Germain	3–1	—N/a	4th
2025–26	League phase	(Spain) Atlético Madrid	2–2	—N/a	4th
2025–26	League phase	(Norway) Vålerenga	—N/a	3–0	4th
2025–26	Quarter-finals	(England) Manchester United	3–2 ^{f}	2–1	5–3
2025–26	Semi-finals	(Spain) Barcelona	2–4	1–1 ^{f}	3–5
2026–27	League phase	(England) Manchester City	—N/a	2–2	
2026–27	League phase	(Portugal) Benfica	3–0	—N/a	
2026–27	League phase	(Spain) Real Madrid	—N/a	2–2	
2026–27	League phase	(France) Paris Saint-Germain	2–1	—N/a	
2026–27	League phase	Austria Wien	4–0	—N/a	
2026–27	League phase	(Spain) Barcelona	—N/a		

^{f} First leg.

== Current staff ==
As of 25 August 2026

Position	Name
Head coach	(Spain) José Barcala
Assistant coaches	(Germany) Clara Schöne (Spain) Adrian Negro
Goalkeeping coach	(Germany) Michael Netolitzky
Fitness coaches	(Germany) Hamid Masoum Beygi (Germany) Moritz Lemmle (Iran) Mohsen Behzadpour
Director	(Germany) Bianca Rech
Sporting director	(Portugal) Francisco De Sá Fardilha
Team manager	(Germany) Nicole Rolser
Team supervisor	Alexandra Milchgießer
Head of Medical	Leonard Achenbach
Team doctors	Frauke Wilken; Vanessa Pfetsch; Jan-Philipp Müller
Physiotherapists	Johannes Schöttl; Franziska Bachmaier; Larissa Hauenstein; Felix Bauer
Kit man	Thomas Fräßdorf
Match analyst	Finn Arnold-Brogan
