= DFB-Supercup Frauen =

Frauen DFB-Supercup
- Organiser(s): Deutscher Fußball Bund
- Founded: 1992–1997; 2023
- Region: Germany
- Teams: 2
- Current champions: Bayern Munich (3rd title)
- Most championships: Bayern Munich (3 titles)
- 2026 DFB-Supercup Frauen

The Frauen DFB-Supercup is a one-off football match in Germany that features the winners of the Frauen-Bundesliga championship and the DFB-Pokal Frauen. It was contested between 1992 and 1997. The competition was revived in summer 2024.

== Matches ==
Below is a list of the Super Cup winners. Before 2024, if a team won both titles, the loser of the cup final was invited.

Year	Frauen-Bundesliga champions	Result	DFB-Pokal Frauen winners (Note: Unless noted otherwise)	Venue
1992	Sportfreunde Siegen	4–0	FSV Frankfurt (Note: DFB-Pokal runners-up)	Niedersachsenstadion, Hanover
1993	FFC Niederkirchen	2–1	Sportfreunde Siegen	Ulrich-Haberland-Stadion, Leverkusen
1994	Sportfreunde Siegen	0–4	FFC Brauweiler Pulheim	Simmertal
1995	FSV Frankfurt	4–0	Sportfreunde Siegen	Rheinstadion, Düsseldorf
1996	Sportfreunde Siegen	0–2 (a.e.t.)	FSV Frankfurt	Nidderau
1997	FFC Brauweiler Pulheim	1–0	Eintracht Rheine	Rheine
2024	Bayern Munich	1–0	VfL Wolfsburg	Rudolf-Harbig-Stadion, Dresden
2025	Bayern Munich	4–2	VfL Wolfsburg (Note: Bundesliga runners-up)	Wildparkstadion, Karlsruhe
2026	Bayern Munich	3–0	VfL Wolfsburg	Audi Sportpark, Ingolstadt

== Performance by team ==
Team	Winners	Runners-up	Years won	Years lost
Bayern Munich	3	0	2024, 2025, 2026	
FSV Frankfurt	2	1	1995, 1996	1992
FFC Brauweiler Pulheim	2	0	1994, 1997	
Sportfreunde Siegen	1	4	1992	1993, 1994, 1995, 1996
FFC Niederkirchen	1	0	1993	
VfL Wolfsburg	0	3		2024, 2025, 2026
Eintracht Rheine	0	1		1997

== Performance by qualification ==
Competition	Winners	Runners-up
Frauen-Bundesliga winners	7	2
DFB-Pokal Frauen winners	2	7
