= 2023–24 DFB-Pokal Frauen =

Tournament details
- Country: Germany
- Venue(s): RheinEnergieStadion, Cologne
- Dates: 12 August 2023 – 9 May 2024
- Teams: 48

Final positions
- Champions: VfL Wolfsburg (11th title)
- Runners-up: Bayern Munich

Tournament statistics
- Matches played: 47
- Goals scored: 217 (4.62 per match)
- Attendance: 118,355 (2,518 per match)
- Top goal scorer(s): Jule Brand; Vivien Endemann (5 goals)
- Goals scored in penalty shoot-outs not included.

The 2023–24 DFB-Pokal was the 42nd season of the annual German football cup competition. Several teams participated in the competition, including all teams from the previous year's Frauen-Bundesliga and the 2. Frauen-Bundesliga, excluding second teams. The competition began on 12 August 2023 with the first of six rounds and ended on 9 May 2024 with the final at the RheinEnergieStadion in Cologne, a nominally neutral venue, which has hosted the final since 2010.

VfL Wolfsburg were the nine-time defending champions and regained the title by defeating Bayern Munich 2–0 in the final.

== Participating clubs ==
The following clubs qualified for the competition:

| Bundesliga the 12 clubs of the 2022–23 season | 2. Bundesliga; 7 of the 14 clubs of the 2022–23 season (Note: The second teams were not eligible.) | Regionalliga the 5 champions and 3 runners-up of the 2022–23 season |
| Werder Bremen; MSV Duisburg; SGS Essen; Eintracht Frankfurt; SC Freiburg; TSG Hoffenheim; 1. FC Köln; Bayer Leverkusen; SV Meppen; Bayern Munich; Turbine Potsdam; VfL Wolfsburg | SG Andernach; FSV Gütersloh; FC Ingolstadt; Carl Zeiss Jena; RB Leipzig; 1. FC Nürnberg; SC Sand | Viktoria Berlin; VfL Bochum (Note: VfL Bochum (3rd place) moved up as Regionalliga West champions Borussia Mönchengladbach were promoted to the 2. Bundesliga and runners-up Borussia Bocholt already qualified as Lower Rhine Cup winners.); SV Elversberg; Hamburger SV; SV Henstedt-Ulzburg (Note: SV Henstedt-Ulzburg (2nd place) moved up as Regionalliga Nord champions Hamburger SV were promoted to the 2. Bundesliga.); Borussia Mönchengladbach; Kickers Offenbach (Note: Kickers Offenbach (4th place) moved up as Regionalliga Süd champions SV 67 Weinberg were promoted to the 2. Bundesliga.); SV 67 Weinberg |
Verbandspokal the 21 winners of the regional association cups
| Baden: Karlsruher SC; Bavaria: FFC Wacker München; Berlin: SFC Stern (Note: SFC Stern qualified regardless of the outcome of the Berlin Cup final, as Viktoria Berlin, the other finalists, already qualified via the Regionalliga.); Brandenburg: Grün-Weiss Brieselang; Bremen: ATS Buntentor; Hamburg: FC St. Pauli; Hesse: TSV Jahn Calden | Lower Rhine: Borussia Bocholt; Lower Saxony: TSV Barmke; Mecklenburg-Vorpommern: Rostocker FC; Middle Rhine: Fortuna Köln; Rhineland: 1. FFC Montabaur; Saarland: 1. FC Riegelsberg (Note: 1. FC Riegelsberg qualified regardless of the outcome of the Berlin Cup final, as SV Elversberg, the other finalists, already qualified via the Regionalliga.); Saxony: Chemnitzer FC (Note: Chemnitzer FC qualified regardless of the outcome of the Saxony Cup final, as RB Leipzig II, the other finalists, were ineligible.) | Saxony-Anhalt: Magdeburger FFC; Schleswig-Holstein: Holstein Kiel; South Baden: Hegauer FV; Southwest: Mainz 05 (Note: TSV Schott Mainz won the Southwestern Cup. After the season, however, the Schott women joined 1. FSV Mainz 05 as planned.); Thuringia: 1. FFV Erfurt (Note: 1. FFV Erfurt qualified regardless of the outcome of the Saxony Cup final, as Carl Zeiss Jena II, the other finalists, were ineligible.); Westphalia: Arminia Bielefeld; Württemberg: SV Hegnach |

== Format ==
Clubs from lower leagues hosted against clubs from higher leagues until the quarter-finals. Should both clubs play below the 2. Bundesliga, there was no host club change anymore.

== Schedule ==
The rounds of the 2023–24 competition were scheduled as follows:

| Round | Matches |
|---|---|
| First round | 12–14 August 2023 |
| Second round | 8–13 September 2023 |
| Round of 16 | 24–26 November 2023 & 21–22 January 2024 |
| Quarter-finals | 5–7 March 2024 |
| Semi-finals | 30–31 March 2024 |
| Final | 9 May 2024 at RheinEnergieStadion, Cologne |

Times up to 28 October 2023 and from 31 March 2024 are CEST (UTC+2). Times from 29 October 2023 to 30 March 2024 are CET (UTC+1).

== First round ==
The draw took place on 29 June 2023, with Doris Fitschen drawing the matches. The games will take place between 12 and 15 August 2023. The teams were split in a North and South group. All clubs from the 2022–23 Frauen-Bundesliga and the four best-placed teams from the 2022–23 2. Frauen-Bundesliga receive a bye.

| 12 August 2023 | Karlsruher SC | 0–4 | SC Sand | Karlsruhe |
| 15:00 | | Report | Matuschewski 3', 35'; Takizawa 45+1'; Schaer 67' | Stadium: GRENKE-Stadion; Attendance: 261; Referee: Theresa Hug |

| 12 August 2023 | TSV Jahn Calden | 7–0 | 1. FFC Montabaur | Calden |
| 16:00 | Hildebrandt 11', 58', 70'; Koch 28', 39', 45'; Dietrich 76' | Report | | Stadium: Stadion Kaiserplatz; Attendance: 178; Referee: Luca Maurer |

| 13 August 2023 | Rostocker FC | 1–13 | Arminia Bielefeld | Rostock |
| 11:00 | Weglowski 51' | Report | Hampel 3', 42', 78'; Kühne 10', 11'; Meynert 18', 27', 44'; Herrmann 32', 39'; Jahn 74'; Schneider 85'; Czekalla 87' | Stadium: Sportplatz Damerower Weg; Referee: Anna-Lena Heidenreich |

| 13 August 2023 | SV Henstedt-Ulzburg | 7–0 | Borussia Bocholt | Henstedt-Ulzburg |
| 11:00 | Pawelec 4'; Hahn 21', 50', 63', 81'; Homp 56', 60' | Report | | Stadium: Beckersberg Stadion; Attendance: 100; Referee: Jacqueline Herrmann |

| 13 August 2023 | ATS Buntentor | 1–4 | Hamburger SV | Bremen |
| 13:00 | Rößeling 21' | Report | Marquardt 60', 62'; Machtens 79'; Hirche 89' | Stadium: BSA Kuhhirten; Attendance: 250; Referee: Lara Wolf |

| 13 August 2023 | Viktoria Berlin | 3–1 | TSV Barmke | Berlin |
| 14:00 | Barsalona 5'; Sänger 12'; Urbanek 38' | Report | Müller 17' | Stadium: Stadion Lichterfelde; Attendance: 615; Referee: Christine Weigelt |

| 13 August 2023 | Grün-Weiss Brieselang | 0–1 | SFC Stern | Brieselang |
| 14:00 | | Report | Cibusch 81' (pen.) | Stadium: Fichte-Sportplatz; Attendance: 199; Referee: Tobias Behm |

| 13 August 2023 | FC St. Pauli | 4–4 (a.e.t.) (3–2 p) | Magdeburger FFC | Hamburg |
| 14:00 | Hechtenberg 34'; McIntosh Kingman 45+1'; Bodenstedt 90'; Schütt 118' | Report | Abraham 27', 58', 83'; Münch 93' | Stadium: Adolf-Jäger-Kampfbahn; Attendance: 1,840; Referee: Celina-Sophie Böhm |
| | Penalties |
| | McIntosh Kingman (penalty scored); Isensee (penalty scored); Jubel (penalty scored) | | (penalty scored) Hildebrand; (penalty scored) Münch |

| 13 August 2023 | VfL Bochum | 3–2 (a.e.t.) | Fortuna Köln | Bochum |
| 14:00 | Hoppius 78'; Lange 93' (pen.); Beyer 117' | Report | Streller 59'; Linden 117' | Stadium: Leichtathletikplatz am Ruhrstadion; Attendance: 1,400; Referee: Jonathan Bäthge |

| 13 August 2023 | Kickers Offenbach | 2–0 | 1. FC Riegelsberg | Offenbach |
| 14:00 | Klich 14' (pen.); Mundt 62' | Report | | Stadium: SANA Sportpark; Attendance: 200; Referee: Anne Uersfeld |

| 13 August 2023 | 1. FFV Erfurt | 0–1 | Mainz 05 | Erfurt |
| 14:00 | | Report | Way 21' | Stadium: Sportforum Johannesplatz; Attendance: 237; Referee: Miriam Schwermer |

| 13 August 2023 | Hegauer FV | 6–2 | Chemnitzer FC | Engen |
| 14:00 | Feldt 6'; Heer 18'; Wikenhauser 43'; Radice 83'; Sardu 87'; Sabellek 90' | Report | Graf 21'; Mihalyi 62' | Stadium: Hegau-Stadion; Attendance: 300; Referee: Valentin Roeck |

| 13 August 2023 | FC Ingolstadt | 2–3 | Carl Zeiss Jena | Ingolstadt |
| 14:00 | Penzkofer 22'; Villena Y Scheffler 90+2' | Report | Ter Horst 6'; Reuter 9'; Mesch 70' | Stadium: MTV-IN-Stadion; Attendance: 238; Referee: Marina Bachmann |

| 13 August 2023 | SV Hegnach | 1–0 | SV Elversberg | Waiblingen |
| 14:00 | Rilling 83' | Report | | Stadium: Sportplatz Hegnach; Attendance: 400; Referee: Koray Aydin |

| 13 August 2023 | FFC Wacker München | 0–4 | SV 67 Weinberg | Munich |
| 15:00 | | Report | Hofmann 26'; Hasenfuß 31'; Wiesinger 51'; Istrefaj 75' | Stadium: Sportanlage Untersendling; Attendance: 200; Referee: Marie-Theres Mühlbauer |

| 15 August 2023 | Holstein Kiel | 2–3 | Borussia Mönchengladbach | Kiel |
| 18:30 | Jürgensen 22'; Labuj 48' | Report | Schmitz 34', 65'; Tichelkamp 58' | Stadium: Holstein-Stadion; Attendance: 2,317; Referee: Anna-Lena Heidenreich |

== Second round ==
The draw took place on 15 August 2023 with Marie-Louise Eta drawing the matches. The teams were split in a North and South group. The matches will take place between 8 and 13 September 2023.

| 8 September 2023 | FC St. Pauli | 1–7 | Hamburger SV | Hamburg |
| 18:30 | Naward 90+' (o.g.) | Report | Mühlhaus 3', 63' (pen.), 88'; Baum 6', 21'; Stöckmann 45+1'; Schulz 60' | Stadium: Millerntor-Stadion; Attendance: 19,710; Referee: Anna-Lena Heidenreich |

| 9 September 2023 | SFC Stern | 0–10 | 1. FC Köln | Berlin |
| 13:00 | | Report | Schimmer 17', 40'; Beck 18', 33' (pen.), 43'; Herber 21' (o.g.); Meßmer 66'; Zeller 73'; Gavrić 83'; Gierig 88' (o.g.) | Stadium: Stadion Lichterfelde; Attendance: 172; Referee: Celina-Sophie Böhm |

| 9 September 2023 | VfL Bochum | 0–4 | SGS Essen | Bochum |
| 13:00 | | Report | Maier 43'; Berentzen 44', 54'; Meißner 53' | Stadium: Ruhrstadion; Attendance: 2,100; Referee: Sabrina Sickl |

| 9 September 2023 | Carl Zeiss Jena | 1–0 | 1. FC Nürnberg | Jena |
| 14:00 | Julević 80' | Report | | Stadium: Ernst-Abbe-Sportfeld; Attendance: 830; Referee: Christine Weigelt |

| 9 September 2023 | SV 67 Weinberg | 0–7 | TSG Hoffenheim | Ansbach |
| 15:00 | | Report | Billa 5'; Cazalla 9'; Memeti 20'; Harsch 31'; Feldkamp 50'; Kössler 85'; Corley 90+1' | Stadium: Xaver-Bertsch-Sportpark; Attendance: 405; Referee: Davina Lutz |

| 9 September 2023 | Borussia Mönchengladbach | 0–3 | Werder Bremen | Mönchengladbach |
| 15:30 | | Report | Dahl 7'; Meyer 30'; Kunkel 90+3' | Stadium: Grenzlandstadion; Attendance: 302; Referee: Anne Uersfeld |

| 9 September 2023 | Arminia Bielefeld | 1–6 | MSV Duisburg | Bielefeld |
| 16:00 | Hampel 81' | Report | Zielinski 1'; Hess 24', 50'; Kappenberger 35'; Fürst 79'; Jerabek 89' | Stadium: EDImedienArena; Attendance: 424; Referee: Katrin Rafalski |

| 9 September 2023 | Viktoria Berlin | 4–0 | SV Henstedt-Ulzburg | Berlin |
| 16:30 | Yaren 44', 90'; Barsalona 45+10', 56' | Report | | Stadium: Stadion Lichterfelde; Attendance: 1,000; Referee: Monique Panetta |

| 9 September 2023 | FSV Gütersloh | 0–7 | RB Leipzig | Rheda-Wiedenbrück |
| 17:30 | | Report | Fudalla 20', 78'; Starke 22'; Landenberger 52'; Andrade 65', 74'; Spitzner 85' | Stadium: Tönnies-Arena; Attendance: 450; Referee: Nadine Westerhoff |

| 10 September 2023 | Turbine Potsdam | 0–2 | VfL Wolfsburg | Potsdam |
| 14:00 | | Report | Oberdorf 45+3'; Brand 57' | Stadium: Karl-Liebknecht-Stadion; Attendance: 1,698; Referee: Jacqueline Herrmann |

| 10 September 2023 | SC Sand | 1–2 | SC Freiburg | Willstätt |
| 14:00 | Bohnen 90+5' | Report | Steinert 48'; Steuerwald 67' | Stadium: Adams-Arena; Attendance: 1,523; Referee: Angelika Söder |

| 10 September 2023 | SG Andernach | 0–2 | Bayern Munich | Andernach |
| 14:00 | | Report | Harder 19'; Damnjanović 75' | Stadium: Rasenplatz Stadion Andernach; Attendance: 4,325; Referee: Nadine Westerhoff |

| 10 September 2023 | Kickers Offenbach | 3–0 | SV Hegnach | Offenbach |
| 14:00 | Mundt 23', 70' (pen.); Seiler 29' | Report | | Stadium: SANA Sportpark; Attendance: 200; Referee: Selina Menzel |

| 10 September 2023 | Mainz 05 | 3–0 | TSV Jahn Calden | Mainz |
| 15:00 | Reifenberg 32'; Anstatt 60'; Way 70' | Report | | Stadium: Bruchwegstadion; Attendance: 1,200; Referee: Paula Mayer |

| 10 September 2023 | SV Meppen | 0–3 | Bayer Leverkusen | Meppen |
| 16:00 | | Report | Kögel 13', 86'; Karczewska 88' | Stadium: Hänsch-Arena; Attendance: 456; Referee: Anke Hölscher |

| 13 September 2023 | Hegauer FV | 0–8 | Eintracht Frankfurt | Singen |
| 18:30 | Feldt 88' | Report | Veit 23'; Martinez 46', 61'; Nachtigall 49'; Acikgöz 65'; Prašnikar 83' (pen.); Reuteler 90+1' | Stadium: Hohentwielstadion; Attendance: 1,240; Referee: Karoline Wacker |

== Round of 16 ==
The draw took place on 18 September 2023 with Verena Schweers drawing the matches. The matches will take place between 24 and 26 November 2023, with two games scheduled for January due to the involvement of Frankfurt and Munich in the 2023–24 UEFA Women's Champions League. However, the January matches were postponed again due to poor weather conditions.

| 24 November 2023 | VfL Wolfsburg | 5–0 | Werder Bremen | Wolfsburg |
| 18:00 | Popp 4', 25'; Pajor 35'; Endemann 63'; Brand 84' | Report | | Stadium: AOK Stadion; Attendance: 2,738; Referee: Miriam Schwermer |

| 25 November 2023 | Hamburger SV | 0–4 | Bayer Leverkusen | Hamburg |
| 14:00 | | Report | Karczewska 24', 52'; Levels 58'; Merino 61' (pen.) | Stadium: Sportpark Eimsbüttel; Attendance: 1,400; Referee: Sina Diekmann |

| 25 November 2023 | SGS Essen | 4–3 | 1. FC Köln | Essen |
| 14:00 | Rieke 6'; Kowalski 15'; Piljić 78'; Sterner 82' | Report | Zeller 23', 60'; Wiankowska 52' | Stadium: Stadion an der Hafenstraße; Attendance: 1,294; Referee: Laura Duske |

| 25 November 2023 | Viktoria Berlin | 1–3 | Carl Zeiss Jena | Berlin |
| 14:00 | Ehegötz 29' | Report | Sänger 39' (o.g.); Mesch 45+1', 65' | Stadium: Stadion Lichterfelde; Attendance: 1,050; Referee: Christine Weigelt |

| 26 November 2023 | TSG Hoffenheim | 3–0 | RB Leipzig | Sinsheim |
| 13:00 | Janssens 8'; Cazalla 58'; Harsch 90+5' | Report | | Stadium: Dietmar-Hopp-Stadion; Attendance: 558; Referee: Naemi Breier |

| 26 November 2023 | Mainz 05 | 0–2 | MSV Duisburg | Mainz |
| 15:00 | | Report | Cin 59'; Günster 88' (pen.) | Stadium: Bruchwegstadion; Attendance: 660; Referee: Davina Lutz |

| 8 February 2024 | Eintracht Frankfurt | 2–1 | SC Freiburg | Frankfurt |
| 18:30 | Martinez 25'; Hanshaw 52' | Report | Steuerwald 87' | Stadium: Stadion am Brentanobad; Attendance: 1,757; Referee: Fabienne Michel |

| 14 February 2024 | Kickers Offenbach | 0–6 | Bayern Munich | Offenbach |
| 19:00 | | Report | Damnjanović 21'; Lohmann 24'; Baijings 78'; Şehitler 85'; Harder 88', 90' | Stadium: Stadion am Bieberer Berg; Attendance: 4,243; Referee: Davina Lutz |

== Quarter-finals ==
The draw was held on 10 December 2023, with Jens Nowotny drawing the matches. The matches will take place between 5 and 7 March 2024.

| 5 March 2024 | TSG Hoffenheim | 0–3 | VfL Wolfsburg | Sinsheim |
| 18:30 | | Report | Brand 27'; Popp 45+2'; Endemann 90+3' | Stadium: Dietmar-Hopp-Stadion; Attendance: 1,996; Referee: Franziska Wildfeuer |

| 5 March 2024 | Bayer Leverkusen | 1–2 | SGS Essen | Leverkusen |
| 18:30 | Wieder 56' | Report | Maier 8'; Elmazi 33' | Stadium: BayArena; Attendance: 3,512; Referee: Katrin Rafalski |

| 5 March 2024 | Carl Zeiss Jena | 0–3 | Bayern Munich | Jena |
| 18:30 | | Report | Harder 12'; Damnjanović 14', 42' | Stadium: Ernst-Abbe-Sportfeld; Attendance: 3,074; Referee: Christine Weigelt |

| 5 March 2024 | Eintracht Frankfurt | 4–1 | MSV Duisburg | Frankfurt |
| 18:30 | Gräwe 6'; Prašnikar 11'; Anyomi 41'; Martinez 77' | Report | Jerabek 66' | Stadium: Stadion am Brentanobad; Attendance: 1,959; Referee: Davina Lutz |

== Semi-finals ==
The draw took place on 5 March 2024, with Lena Lotzen drawing the matches. The matches took place between 30 and 31 March 2024.

| 30 March 2024 | VfL Wolfsburg | 9–0 | SGS Essen | Wolfsburg |
| 13:00 | Brand 14'; Pajor 16'; Endemann 37', 51', 82'; Janssen 66'; Jöster 70' (o.g.); Xhemaili 83'; Huth 89' | Report | | Stadium: AOK Stadium; Attendance: 2,889; Referee: Naemi Breier |

| 31 March 2024 | Bayern Munich | 1–1 (a.e.t.) (3–1 p) | Eintracht Frankfurt | Munich |
| 15:45 | Stanway 4' (pen.) | Report | Reuteler 18' | Stadium: FC Bayern Campus; Attendance: 2,500; Referee: Riem Hussein |
| | Penalties |
| | Stanway (penalty missed); Lohmann (penalty scored); Eriksson (penalty scored); Harder (penalty scored) | | (penalty missed) Freigang; (penalty missed) Reuteler; (penalty missed) Prašnikar; (penalty scored) Dunst |

== Final ==
The final took place on 9 May 2024 at the RheinEnergieStadion, Cologne.

9 May 2024
16:00

| Bayern Munich | 0–2 | VfL Wolfsburg |
|---|---|---|
| | Report | Brand 14'; Janssen 40' |

RheinEnergieStadion, Cologne
Attendance: 44,000
Referee: Miriam Schwermer

| Bayern Munich | VfL Wolfsburg |

| GK | 22 | (Germany) Maria Luisa Grohs |
| RB | 7 | (Germany) Giulia Gwinn | (yellow card) 36' |
| CB | 4 | (Iceland) Glódís Perla Viggósdóttir (c) |
| CB | 5 | (Sweden) Magdalena Eriksson |
| LB | 19 | (Austria) Katharina Naschenweng | | (substituted off) 46' |
| CM | 25 | (Austria) Sarah Zadrazil | | (substituted off) 85' |
| CM | 31 | (England) Georgia Stanway | (yellow card) 62' |
| RW | 21 | (Denmark) Pernille Harder |
| AM | 9 | (Serbia) Jovana Damnjanović | | (substituted off) 72' |
| LW | 17 | (Germany) Klara Bühl | | (substituted off) 72' |
| CF | 11 | (Germany) Lea Schüller |
Substitutes:
| GK | 41 | (Germany) Anna Wellmann |
| DF | 2 | (Sweden) Linda Sembrant |
| DF | 3 | (France) Inès Belloumou |
| DF | 6 | (Norway) Tuva Hansen | | (substituted in) 46' |
| DF | 30 | (Germany) Carolin Simon | | (substituted in) 85' |
| MF | 10 | (Germany) Linda Dallmann | (yellow card) 81' | (substituted in) 72' |
| MF | 12 | (Germany) Sydney Lohmann | | (substituted in) 72' |
| MF | 18 | (Netherlands) Jill Baijings |
| MF | 26 | (Scotland) Sam Kerr |
Manager:
(Norway) Alexander Straus

| GK | 1 | (Germany) Merle Frohms |
| RB | 2 | (Netherlands) Lynn Wilms |
| CB | 4 | (Germany) Kathrin Hendrich |
| CB | 6 | (Netherlands) Dominique Janssen |
| LB | 14 | (Spain) Nuria Rábano | | (substituted off) 80' |
| DM | 5 | (Germany) Lena Oberdorf | (yellow card) 50' |
| CM | 10 | (Germany) Svenja Huth |
| CM | 11 | (Germany) Alexandra Popp (c) |
| RW | 25 | (Germany) Vivien Endemann | | (substituted off) 68' |
| LW | 29 | (Germany) Jule Brand | | (substituted off) 90+1' |
| CF | 9 | (Poland) Ewa Pajor |
Substitutes:
| GK | 22 | (Germany) Lisa Schmitz |
| DF | 24 | (Germany) Joelle Wedemeyer | | (substituted in) 90+1' |
| DF | 31 | (Germany) Marina Hegering | | (substituted in) 80' |
| MF | 7 | (Germany) Chantal Hagel |
| MF | 8 | (Germany) Lena Lattwein |
| MF | 17 | (Germany) Kristin Demann |
| MF | 23 | (Iceland) Sveindís Jane Jónsdóttir | | (substituted in) 68' |
| MF | 27 | (Switzerland) Riola Xhemaili |
| FW | 18 | (Netherlands) Fenna Kalma |
Manager:
(Germany) Tommy Stroot

Assistant referees:
Katrin Rafalski
Katharina Kruse
Fourth official:
Christine Weigelt
Video assistant referee:
Riem Hussein
Assistant video assistant referee:
Franziska Wildfeuer

Match rules

- 90 minutes.
- 30 minutes of extra time if necessary.
- Penalty shoot-out if scores still level.
- Nine named substitutes.
- Maximum of five substitutions. (Note: Each team will be given only three opportunities to make substitutions, with a fourth opportunity in extra time, excluding substitutions made at half-time, before the start of extra time and at half-time in extra time.)

== Top goalscorers ==
Goals scored in penalty shoot-outs are not included.

| Rank | Player | Team | Goals |
|---|---|---|---|
| 1 | (Germany) Jule Brand | VfL Wolfsburg | 5 |
| 1 | (Germany) Vivien Endemann | VfL Wolfsburg | 5 |
| 3 | (Serbia) Jovana Damnjanović | Bayern Munich | 4 |
| 3 | (Germany) Indra Hahn | SV Henstedt-Ulzburg | 4 |
| 3 | (Germany) Jocelyn Hampel | Arminia Bielefeld | 4 |
| 3 | (Denmark) Pernille Harder | Bayern Munich | 4 |
| 3 | (Germany) Shekiera Martinez | Eintracht Frankfurt | 4 |
| 8 | 12 players | | 3 |
