= 2023–24 VfL Wolfsburg (women) season =

VfL Wolfsburg
2023–24 season
- Frauen-Bundesliga: Runners Up
- DFB-Pokal Frauen: Winners
- UEFA Women's Champions League: Round 2

The 2023–24 VfL Wolfsburg (women) season started on 10 September 2023 against Turbine Potsdam. On 21 June 2023, the German Football Association announced that the VfL Wolfsburg women's team received their license, along with the rest of the Frauen-Bundesliga and 2. Frauen-Bundesliga clubs, for the 2023–24 season. Pre–season training started on 20 July 2023.

== Season review ==
=== League ===
==== September and October ====
VfL Wolfsburg opened their 2023–24 Frauen-Bundesliga campaign against Bayer Leverkusen. The match took place on 17 September 2023 at AOK-Stadion in Wolfsburg. Prior to the match, Alexandra Popp was presented with the Footballer of the Year trophy. VfL Wolfsburg won 3–0 with goals from Lena Oberdorf, Lena Lattwein, and Sveindís Jónsdóttir. VfL Wolfsburg finished matchday one in third place.

=== DFB-Pokal Frauen ===
VfL Wolfsburg's opening match of the season was a second round match against Turbine Potsdam. Wolfsburg and Turbine Potsdam were allowed first round byes. The match took place on 10 September 2023 at Karl-Liebknecht-Stadion in Potsdam. Wolfsburg won 2–0 with goals from Lena Oberdorf and Jule Brand.

=== UEFA Women's Champions League ===
As the second–place team in the 2022–23 Frauen-Bundesliga, VfL Wolfsburg qualified for Round 2 of qualifying of the 2023–24 UEFA Women's Champions League.

== Competitions ==
=== Frauen-Bundesliga ===
==== Frauen-Bundesliga results ====
MD	Date	Opponent	Home/Away	Results F–A	Goalscorers	Attendance	Pos.	Ref.
1	17 September 2023	Bayer Leverkusen	Home	3–0	Oberdorf, Lattwein, Jónsdóttir	3,728	3rd	
2	1 October 2023	Eintracht Frankfurt	Away	2–4	Popp, Oberdorf, Wedemeyer, Pajor	13,500	2nd	DFB.de
3	6 October 2023	1. FC Nürnberg	Home	1–0	Kalma	3,062	1st	DFB.de
4	15 October 2023	RB Leipzig	Away	0–2	Pajor, Endemann	10,269	1st	DFB.de
5	22 October 2023	1899 Hoffenheim	Home	2–2	Janssen, Popp	3,707	1st	DFB.de
6	5 November 2023	Bayern Munich	Away	2–1	Oberdorf	4,347	2nd	DFB.de
7	12 November 2023	SC Freiburg	Home	4–0	Pajor (2), Endemann, Lattwein	3,017	2nd	DFB.de
8	19 November 2023	MSV Duisburg	Home	2–0	Kalma, Pajor	2,677	2nd	DFB.de
9	10 December 2023	1. FC Köln	Away	1–4	Huth, Janssen, Endemann, Wedemeyer	3,600	2nd	DFB.de
10	17 December 2023	Werder Bremen	Home	1–0	Janssen	2,814	1st	DFB.de
11	28 January 2024	SGS Essen	Away	1–3	Endemann, Hegering, Pajor	3,842	1st	DFB.de
12	4 February 2024	Bayer Leverkusen	Away	1–1	Popp	1,755	2nd	DFB.de
13	11 February 2024	Eintracht Frankfurt	Home	3–0	Johannes, Lattwein, Endemann	8,867	2nd	DFB.de
14	18 February 2024	1. FC Nürnberg	Away	1–9	Endemann, Popp (2), Pajor (4), Hagel, Kalma	2,446	2nd	DFB.de
15	10 March 2024	RB Leipzig	Home	4–0	Hegering, Brand (2), Jónsdóttir	2,667	2nd	DFB.de, Fussball.de
16	17 March 2024	1899 Hoffenheim	Away	2–1	Brand	2,212	2nd	DFB.de
17	24 March 2024	Bayern Munich	Home	0–4		24,437	2nd	DFB.de
18	14 April 2024	SC Freiburg	Away	1–4	Oberdorf, Pajor (2), Xhemaili	3,795	2nd	DFB.de
19	21 April 2024	MSV Duisburg	Away	1–4	Popp, Janssen, Endemann, Pajor	2,041	2nd	DFB.de
20	5 May 2024	1. FC Köln	Home	5–1	Janssen, Pajor (2), Popp, Endemann	3,151	2nd	DFB.de
21	12 May 2024	Werder Bremen	Away	0–3	Oberdorf, Jónsdóttir, Hagel	3,478	2nd	DFB.de
22	20 May 2024	SGS Essen	Home	6–0	Hagel, Pajor (3), Endemann, Brand	4,469	2nd	DFB.de

==== Frauen-Bundesliga table ====
Pos	Team	Pld	W	D	L	GF	GA	GD	Pts	Qualification or relegation
1	Bayern Munich (C)	22	19	3	0	60	8	+52	60	Qualification for Champions League group stage
2	VfL Wolfsburg	22	17	2	3	67	19	+48	53	Qualification for Champions League second round
3	Eintracht Frankfurt	22	14	2	6	42	25	+17	44	Qualification for Champions League first round
4	SGS Essen	22	10	5	7	33	26	+7	35	
5	TSG Hoffenheim	22	10	4	8	43	35	+8	34	
6	Bayer Leverkusen	22	8	7	7	34	25	+9	31	
7	Werder Bremen	22	8	4	10	34	31	+3	28	
8	RB Leipzig	22	7	5	10	26	41	−15	26	
9	SC Freiburg	22	6	6	10	26	44	−18	24	
10	1. FC Köln	22	5	3	14	25	43	−18	18	
11	1. FC Nürnberg (R)	22	4	3	15	16	61	−45	15	Relegation to 2. Bundesliga
12	MSV Duisburg (R)	22	0	4	18	16	64	−48	4	Demotion to Regionalliga

Source: DFB
Rules for classification: 1) Points; 2) Goal difference; 3) Goals scored; 4) Head-to-head results; 5) Head-to-head away goals scored; 6) Away goals scored; 7) Play-off.
(C) Champions; (R) Relegated

==== Frauen-Bundesliga results overview ====
Overall								Home						Away					
Pld	W	D	L	GF	GA	GD	Pts	W	D	L	GF	GA	GD	W	D	L	GF	GA	GD
22	17	2	3	67	19	+48	53	9	1	1	31	7	+24	8	1	2	36	12	+24

Last updated: complete.
Source: Frauen-Bundesliga results

=== DFB-Pokal Frauen results ===
Date	Round	Opponent	Venue	Result F–A	Goalscorers	Attendance	Ref.
10 September 2023	2	Turbine Potsdam	Away	2–0	Oberdorf, Brand	1,698	
24 November 2023	3	Werder Bremen	home	5–0	Popp (2), Pajor, Endemann, Brand	2,738	DFB.de
5 March 2024	4	TSG Hoffenheim	away	3–0	Brand, Popp, Endemann	1,996	DFB.de
30 March 2024	5	SGS Essen	home	9–0	Brand, Pajor, Endemann (3), Janssen, Jöster (o.g.), Xhemaili, Huth	2,889	DFB.de
9 May 2024	6	Bayern Munich	neutral ground	2–0	Brand, Janssen	44,000	DFB.de

=== UEFA Women's Champions League results ===
==== Qualifying rounds ====
Date	Round	Opponent	Venue	Result F–A	Goalscorers	Attendance	Ref.
10 October 2023	R2 – FL	Paris FC	Away	3–3	Endemann, Popp (2)	3,257	UEFA.com
18 October 2023	R2 – SL	Paris FC	Home	0–2		3,747	UEFA.com

=== Overall record ===
Competition	First match	Last match	Starting round	Final position	Record							
Competition	First match	Last match	Starting round	Final position	Pld	W	D	L	GF	GA	GD	Win %
Frauen-Bundesliga	17 September 2023	20 May 2024	Matchday 1	Runners-up	22	17	2	3	67	19	+48	77.27
DFB-Pokal Frauen	10 September 2023	9 May 2024	Second round	Winner	5	5	0	0	21	0	+21	100.00
UEFA Women's Champions League	11 October 2023	18 October 2023	Round 2	Round 2	2	0	1	1	3	5	−2	0.00
Total					29	22	3	4	91	24	+67	75.86

Source: Competitions

== Roster and statistics ==
=== Roster and statistics ===
==== Goalscorers ====
As of match played 20 May 2024

Goalscorers in all competitions
Player	Goals
Ewa Pajor	20
Vivien Endemann	15
Alexandra Popp	12
Jule Brand	9
Dominique Janssen	7
Lena Oberdorf	6
Chantal Hagel	3
Sveindís Jónsdóttir	3
Fenna Kalma	3
Lena Lattwein	3
Marina Hegering	2
Svenja Huth	2
Joelle Wedemeyer	2
Riola Xhemaili	2
Stina Johannes	1

Frauen-Bundesliga goalscorers
Player	Goals
Ewa Pajor	18
Vivien Endemann	9
Alexandra Popp	7
Dominique Janssen	5
Lena Oberdorf	5
Jule Brand	4
Chantal Hagel	3
Sveindís Jónsdóttir	3
Fenna Kalma	3
Lena Lattwein	3
Marina Hegering	2
Joelle Wedemeyer	2
Svenja Huth	1
Stina Johannes	1
Riola Xhemaili	1

DFB-Pokal Frauen goalscorers
Player	Goals
Vivien Endemann	5
Jule Brand	5
Alexandra Popp	3
Dominique Janssen	2
Ewa Pajor	2
Svenja Huth	1
Lena Oberdorf	1
Riola Xhemaili	1

UEFA Women's Champions League goalscorers
Player	Goals
Alexandra Popp	2
Vivien Endemann	1

=== Other statistics ===
==== Discipline ====
As of match played 20 May 2024

Yellow and red cards from all competitions
Players	Yellow card	(yellow card) (red card)	Red card
Lena Oberdorf	7	0	0
Jule Brand	4	0	0
Marina Hegering	2	1	0
Kathrin Hendrich	3	0	0
Nuria Rábano	3	0	0
Vivien Endemann	2	0	0
Svenja Huth	2	0	0
Dominique Janssen	2	0	0
Lynn Wilms	2	0	0
Sara Agrež	1	0	0
Chantal Hagel	1	0	0
Sveindís Jónsdóttir	1	0	0
Camilla Küver	1	0	0
Ewa Pajor	1	0	0
Alexandra Popp	1	0	0
Felicitas Rauch	1	0	0
Tommy Stroot (man.)	1	0	0
Joelle Wedemeyer	1	0	0
Totals	36	1	0

Yellow and red cards in Frauen-Bundesliga
Players	Yellow card	(yellow card) (red card)	Red card
Lena Oberdorf	5	0	0
Marina Hegering	2	1	0
Jule Brand	3	0	0
Vivien Endemann	2	0	0
Svenja Huth	2	0	0
Lynn Wilms	2	0	0
Sara Agrež	1	0	0
Chantal Hagel	1	0	0
Kathrin Hendrich	1	0	0
Dominique Janssen	1	0	0
Sveindís Jónsdóttir	1	0	0
Camilla Küver	1	0	0
Ewa Pajor	1	0	0
Alexandra Popp	1	0	0
Nuria Rábano	1	0	0
Felicitas Rauch	1	0	0
Tommy Stroot (man.)	1	0	0
Joelle Wedemeyer	1	0	0
Totals	28	1	0

Yellow and red cards from the DFB-Pokal Frauen
Players	Yellow card	(yellow card) (red card)	Red card
Lena Oberdorf	2	0	0
Nuria Rábano	2	0	0
Jule Brand	1	0	0
Totals	5	0	0

Yellow and red cards from the UEFA Women's Champions League
Players	Yellow card	(yellow card) (red card)	Red card
Kathrin Hendrich	2	0	0
Dominique Janssen	1	0	0
Totals	3	0	0

==== Clean sheets ====
As of match played 20 May 2024

Clean sheets
No.	Goalkeeper	Competition	Opponent	Final score	Ref.
1	Merle Frohms	DFB-Pokal Frauen	Turbine Potsdam	0–2	
2	Merle Frohms	Frauen-Bundesliga	Bayer Leverkusen	3–0	DFB.de
3	Merle Frohms	Frauen-Bundesliga	1. FC Nürnberg	1–0	DFB.de
4	Lisa Schmitz	Frauen-Bundesliga	RB Leipzig	0–2	DFB.de
5	Merle Frohms	Frauen-Bundesliga	SC Freiburg	4–0	DFB.de
6	Merle Frohms	Frauen-Bundesliga	MSV Duisburg	2–0	DFB.de
7	Merle Frohms	DFB-Pokal Frauen	Werder Bremen	5–0	DFB.de
8	Merle Frohms	Frauen-Bundesliga	Werder Bremen	1–0	DFB.de
9	Merle Frohms	Frauen-Bundesliga	Eintracht Frankfurt	3–0	DFB.de
10	Merle Frohms	DFB-Pokal Frauen	TSG Hoffenheim	0–3	DFB.de
11	Merle Frohms	Frauen-Bundesliga	RB Leipzig	4–0	DFB.de
12	Merle Frohms	DFB-Pokal Frauen	SGS Essen	9–0	DFB.de
13	Merle Frohms	DFB-Pokal Frauen	Bayern Munich	0–2	DFB.de
14	Merle Frohms	Frauen-Bundesliga	Werder Bremen	0–3	DFB.de
15	Merle Frohms	Frauen-Bundesliga	SGS Essen	6–0	DFB.de

== Transfers and contracts ==
=== Transfers ===
Transferred in
Pos.	Name	Age	EU	Moving from	Type	Transfer Window	Ref.
Midfielder	Sandra Starke	29	Yes	Chicago Red Stars	Loan return	Summer	
Goalkeeper	Lisa Schmitz	31	Yes	Montpellier HSC	Transfer	Summer	
Goalkeeper	Anneke Borbe	22	Yes	Werder Bremen	Transfer	Summer	
Midfielder	Chantal Hagel	24	Yes	1899 Hoffenheim	Transfer	Summer	
Forward	Vivien Endemann	21	Yes	SGS Essen	Transfer	Summer	
Midfielder	Riola Xhemaili	20	Yes	SC Freiburg	Transfer	Summer	
Defender	Camilla Küver	20	Yes	Eintracht Frankfurt	Free Transfer	Summer	
Forward	Fenna Kalma	23	Yes	FC Twente	Free transfer	Summer	
Left Back	Nuria Rábano	24	Yes	FC Barcelona	Free transfer	Summer	

Transferred out
Pos.	Name	Age	EU	Moving to	Type	Transfer Window	Ref.
Midfielder	Sandra Starke	29	Yes	RB Leipzig	Transfer	Summer	
Goalkeeper	Julia Kassen	21	Yes	SC Freiburg	Transfer	Summer	
Goalkeeper	Katarzyna Kiedrzynek	32	Yes	Paris Saint-Germain	Transfer	Summer	
Forward	Pauline Bremer	27	Yes	Brighton & Hove Albion	Transfer	Summer	
Midfielder	Jill Roord	26	Yes	Manchester City	Transfer	Summer	
Midfielder	Pia-Sophie Wolter	25	Yes	Eintracht Frankfurt	Loan	Summer	

=== Contracts ===
Player	Contract length	Expiry date	Ref.
Kathrin Hendrich	One–year extension	30 June 2025	
