= 2023–24 FC Bayern Munich (women) season =

Bayern Munich (women)
2023–24 season
- President: Herbert Hainer
- Head Coach: Alexander Straus
- Stadium: FC Bayern Campus
- Frauen-Bundesliga: 1st
- DFB-Pokal Frauen: Runners-up
- Women's Champions League: 3rd in group
- Top goalscorer: League: Lea Schüller (11); All: Jovana Damnjanović; Lea Schüller (14 each)
Home colours	Away colours	Third colours

The 2023–24 FC Bayern Munich (women) season is the club's 24th consecutive season in the Frauen-Bundesliga. On 21 June 2023, the German Football Association announced that the Bayern Munich women's team received their license, along with the rest Frauen-Bundesliga and 2. Frauen-Bundesliga clubs, for the 2023–24 season. Bayern Munich started their season on 10 September 2023 in the DFB-Pokal Frauen. The schedule for the 2023–24 Frauen-Bundesliga came out on 14 July 2023 and Bayern Munich will face SC Freiburg in Freiburg in the opening match of the 2023–24 Frauen-Bundesliga season.

== Season review ==
=== Pre–season review ===
During pre–season, Bayern Munich defeated Sparta Prague with two goals from Glódís Perla Viggósdóttir. Sparta Prague got a goal from Tereza Kozarova. The pre–season match against TSG Hoffenheim finished in a 2–2 draw. Bayern Munich got two goals from Jovana Damnjanović and Hoffenheim got goals from Paulina Krumbiegel and Ereleta Memeti. Bayern Munich played their third pre–season match against Fortuna Sittard at FC Bayern Campus in Munich on 1 September 2023. Bayern Munich won 3–0 with goals from Lea Schüller, Pernille Harder, and Jill Baijings.

=== Frauen-Bundesliga ===
==== September and October ====
On 15 September 2023, Bayern Munich played the opening match of the season at SC Freiburg.

=== DFB-Pokal Frauen ===
Bayern Munich started their season with a second round match in the DFB-Pokal Frauen. The match took place on 10 September 2023 at Andernach Stadion in Andernach. Bayern Munich won 2–0 with goals from Pernille Harder and Jovana Damnjanović. Harder's goal was her first for Bayern Munich.

=== UEFA Women's Champions League ===
As the 2022–23 Frauen-Bundesliga champions, Bayern Munich qualified for the 2023–24 UEFA Women's Champions League group stage.

=== Pre–season ===
5 August 2023 Friendly	Bayern Munich	2–1	Sparta Prague	Regensburg
14:00 CEST	Viggósdóttir 11', 29'	Report	Kozarova 15'	Stadium: BSC Regensburg sports ground Referee: Marie-Theres Mühlbauer (Pölling)
Note: Game played as two 30-minute halves

23 August 2023 Friendly	Bayern Munich	2–2	TSG Hoffenheim	Mietingen
18:00 CEST	Damnjanović 12', 17'	Report	Krumbiegel 2'; Memeti 41'	Stadium: Sportplatz Mietingen; Attendance: 2,200; Referee: Daniela Kottmann

1 September 2023 Friendly	Bayern Munich	3–0	Fortuna Sittard	Munich
18:00 CEST	Schüller 10'; Harder 17'; Baijings 32'	Report		Stadium: FC Bayern Campus; Attendance: 1,224; Referee: Marina Bachmann

6 September 2023 Friendly	Bayern Munich	3–2	Manchester United W.F.C.	Herzogenaurach
18:00 CEST	Harder 59'; Bühl 66' (pen.); Dallmann 86'	Report	Galton 15'; Geyse 22'	Stadium: Adi Dassler Sportplatz; Attendance: Behind Closed Doors; Referee: Angelika Söder

== Competitions ==
=== Frauen-Bundesliga ===
==== League table ====
Pos	Team	Pld	W	D	L	GF	GA	GD	Pts	Qualification or relegation
1	Bayern Munich (C)	22	19	3	0	60	8	+52	60	Qualification for Champions League group stage
2	VfL Wolfsburg	22	17	2	3	67	19	+48	53	Qualification for Champions League second round
3	Eintracht Frankfurt	22	14	2	6	42	25	+17	44	Qualification for Champions League first round
4	SGS Essen	22	10	5	7	33	26	+7	35	
5	TSG Hoffenheim	22	10	4	8	43	35	+8	34	
6	Bayer Leverkusen	22	8	7	7	34	25	+9	31	
7	Werder Bremen	22	8	4	10	34	31	+3	28	
8	RB Leipzig	22	7	5	10	26	41	−15	26	
9	SC Freiburg	22	6	6	10	26	44	−18	24	
10	1. FC Köln	22	5	3	14	25	43	−18	18	
11	1. FC Nürnberg (R)	22	4	3	15	16	61	−45	15	Relegation to 2. Bundesliga
12	MSV Duisburg (R)	22	0	4	18	16	64	−48	4	Demotion to Regionalliga

Source: DFB
Rules for classification: 1) Points; 2) Goal difference; 3) Goals scored; 4) Head-to-head results; 5) Head-to-head away goals scored; 6) Away goals scored; 7) Play-off.
(C) Champions; (R) Relegated

==== Matches ====
15 September 2023 1	SC Freiburg	2–2	Bayern Munich	Freiburg
18:15 UTC+2	Minge 7'; Fölmli 90+7'	Report	Schüller 21'; Naschenweng 90'	Stadium: Dreisamstadion; Attendance: 13,234; Referee: Riem Hussein

2 October 2023 2	Bayern Munich	2–0	1. FC Köln	Munich
19:30 UTC+2	Harder 45'; Dallmann 57'	Report		Stadium: FC Bayern Campus; Attendance: 2,500; Referee: Franziska Wildfeuer

8 October 2023 3	SGS Essen	0–2	Bayern Munich	Essen
14:00 UTC+2		Report	Harder 13'; Schüller 24'	Stadium: Stadion Essen; Attendance: 4,642; Referee: Naemi Breier

14 October 2023 4	Bayern Munich	0–0	Eintracht Frankfurt	Munich
17:55 UTC+2		Report		Stadium: Allianz Arena; Attendance: 19,000; Referee: Karoline Wacker

22 October 2023 5	RB Leipzig	0–3	Bayern Munich	Leipzig
18:30 UTC+2		Report	Gwinn 8'; Damnjanović 14', 42'	Stadium: RB-Trainingszentrum Cottaweg; Attendance: 2,015; Referee: Laura Duske

5 November 2023 6	Bayern Munich	2–1	VfL Wolfsburg	Munich
15:00 UTC+1	Dallmann 29'; Bühl 37'	Report	Oberdorf 63'	Stadium: FC Bayern Campus; Attendance: 4,347; Referee: Riem Hussein

12 November 2023 7	Bayern Munich	2–0	MSV Duisburg	Munich
18:30 UTC+1	Damnjanović 8'; Stanway 72' (pen.)	Report		Stadium: FC Bayern Campus; Attendance: 1,902; Referee: Miriam Schwermer

19 November 2023 8	Werder Bremen	0–2	Bayern Munich	Bremen
18:30 UTC+1		Report	Eriksson 2'; Naschenweng 24'	Stadium: Weserstadion Platz 11; Attendance: 3,049; Referee: Nadine Westerhoff

11 December 2023 9	Bayern Munich	3–0	Bayer Leverkusen	Munich
19:30 UTC+1	Eriksson 6'; Gwinn 52'; Damnjanović 58'	Report		Stadium: FC Bayern Campus; Attendance: 1,679; Referee: Fabienne Michel

17 December 2023 10	1. FC Nürnberg	1–1	Bayern Munich	Nuremberg
18:30 UTC+1	Dešić 72' (pen.)	Report	Schüller 11'	Stadium: Max-Morlock-Stadion; Attendance: 4,149; Referee: Sina Diekmann

27 January 2024 11	Bayern Munich	1–0	TSG Hoffenheim	Munich
14:00 UTC+1	Bühl 22'	Report		Stadium: FC Bayern Campus; Attendance: 2,500; Referee: Nadine Westerhoff

5 February 2024 12	Bayern Munich	4–0	SC Freiburg	Munich
19:30 UTC+1	Sembrant 6'; Schüller 19'; Dallmann 58'; Naschenweng 60'	Report		Stadium: FC Bayern Campus; Attendance: 1,675; Referee: Karoline Wacker

10 February 2024 13	1. FC Köln	0–5	Bayern Munich	Cologne
14:00 UTC+1		Report	Dallmann 18'; Hechler 34' (o.g.); Schüller 45+3'; Stanway 52'; Damnjanović 64'	Stadium: Franz-Kremer-Stadium; Attendance: 3,002; Referee: Franziska Wildfeuer

18 February 2024 14	Bayern Munich	2–0	SGS Essen	Munich
16:00 UTC+1	Viggósdóttir 54'; Damnjanović 79'	Report		Stadium: FC Bayern Campus; Attendance: 2,500; Referee: Anna-Lena Heidenreich

9 March 2024 15	Eintracht Frankfurt	1–2	Bayern Munich	Frankfurt
13:00 UTC+1	Freigang 67'	Report	Bühl 21'; Schüller 77'	Stadium: Stadion am Brentanobad; Attendance: 5,750; Referee: Naemi Breier

16 March 2024 16	Bayern Munich	5–0	RB Leipzig	Munich
12:00 UTC+1	Harder 2', 63'; Schüller 4', 19'; Dallmann 90+2'	Report		Stadium: FC Bayern Campus; Attendance: 2,500; Referee: Davina Lutz

23 March 2024 17	VfL Wolfsburg	0–4	Bayern Munich	Wolfsburg
17:45 UTC+1		Report	Harder 48'; Bühl 57'; Schüller 76'; Stanway 87'	Stadium: Volkswagen Arena; Attendance: 24,437; Referee: Fabienne Michel

14 April 2024 18	MSV Duisburg	1–5	Bayern Munich	Duisburg
18:30 UTC+2	Ries 42'	Report	Gwinn 49'; Stanway 52'; Eriksson 63'; Damnjanović 87'; Lohmann 90'	Stadium: PCC-Stadion; Attendance: 2,486; Referee: Annika Kost

22 April 2024 19	Bayern Munich	3–0	Werder Bremen	Munich
19:30 UTC+2	Eriksson 48'; Damnjanović 57'; Stanway 90+5'	Report		Stadium: FC Bayern Campus; Attendance: 2,500; Referee: Christine Weigelt

4 May 2024 20	Bayer Leverkusen	1–2	Bayern Munich	Leverkusen
12:00 UTC+2	Karczewska 62'	Report	Stanway 17'; Dallmann 27'	Stadium: Ulrich-Haberland-Stadion; Attendance: 2,817; Referee: Anna-Lena Heidenreich

12 May 2024 21	Bayern Munich	4–0	1. FC Nürnberg	Munich
14:00 UTC+2	Harder 5', 13', 19'; Schüller 79'	Report		Stadium: FC Bayern Campus; Attendance: 2,500; Referee: Laura Duske

20 May 2024 22	TSG Hoffenheim	1–4	Bayern Munich	Hoffenheim
15:30 UTC+2	Dongus 21'	Report	Simon 10'; Dallmann 54'; Harder 83'; Schüller 90+3'	Stadium: Dietmar-Hopp-Stadion; Attendance: 4,330; Referee: Naemi Breier

=== DFB-Pokal Frauen ===
10 September 2023 Second round	SG Andernach	0–2	Bayern Munich	Andernach
14:00 UTC+2	Krump (yellow card) 35'; K Schermuly (yellow card) 70'	Report	Harder 19'; Stanway (yellow card) 36'; Damnjanović 75'	Stadium: Stadion Bassenheimer; Attendance: 4,325; Referee: Nadine Westerhoff

14 February 2024 Round of 16	Kickers Offenbach	0–6	Bayern Munich	Offenbach
19:00 UTC+1		Report	Damnjanović 21'; Lohmann 24'; Baijings 78'; Şehitler 85'; Harder 88', 90'	Stadium: Stadion am Bieberer Berg; Attendance: 4,243; Referee: Davina Lutz

5 March 2024 Quarter-finals	Carl Zeiss Jena	0–3	Bayern Munich	Jena
18:30 UTC+1		Report	Harder 12'; Damnjanović 14', 42'	Stadium: Ernst-Abbe-Sportfeld; Attendance: 3,074; Referee: Christine Weigelt

31 March 2024 Semi-finals	Bayern Munich	1–1 (a.e.t.) (3–1 p)	Eintracht Frankfurt	Munich
15:45 UTC+2	Stanway 4' (pen.)	Report	Reuteler 18'	Stadium: FC Bayern Campus; Attendance: 2,500; Referee: Riem Hussein
	Penalties
	Stanway (penalty missed); Lohmann (penalty scored); Eriksson (penalty scored); Harder (penalty scored)		(penalty missed) Freigang; (penalty missed) Reuteler; (penalty missed) Prašnikar; (penalty scored) Dunst

9 May 2024 Final	Bayern Munich	0–2	VfL Wolfsburg	Cologne
16:00 UTC+2		Report	Brand 14'; Janssen 40'	Stadium: RheinEnergieStadion; Attendance: 44,000; Referee: Miriam Schwermer

=== UEFA Women's Champions League ===
==== UEFA Women's Champions League review ====
As the 2022–23 Frauen-Bundesliga champions, Bayern Munich qualified for the 2023–24 UEFA Women's Champions League group stage.

==== Group stage ====
15 November 2023 1	Bayern Munich (Germany)	2–2	(Italy) Roma	Munich, Germany
18:45 UTC+1	Damnjanović 20'; Linari 45+4' (o.g.)	Report	Viens 58'; Giugliano 90+1'	Stadium: FC Bayern Campus; Attendance: 2,500; Referee: Rebecca Welch (England)

23 November 2023 2	Paris-Saint Germain (France)	0–1	(Germany) Bayern Munich	Paris, France
18:45 UTC+1		Report	Eriksson 21'	Stadium: Stade Jean-Bouin; Attendance: 3,669; Referee: Marta Huerta De Aza (Spain)

14 December 2023 3	Bayern Munich (Germany)	1–1	(Netherlands) Ajax	Munich, Germany
18:45 UTC+1	Schüller 2'	Report	Grant 38'	Stadium: FC Bayern Campus; Attendance: 2,500; Referee: Kateryna Monzul (Ukraine)

20 December 2023 4	Ajax (Netherlands)	1–0	(Germany) Bayern Munich	Amsterdam, Netherlands
18:45 UTC+1	Leuchter 44'	Report		Stadium: Johan Cruyff Arena; Referee: Cheryl Foster (Wales)

24 January 2024 5	Roma (Italy)	2–2	(Germany) Bayern Munich	Rome, Italy
18:45 UTC+1	Giacinti 33'; Giugliano 90+3'	Report	Schüller 87', 90+6'	Stadium: Stadio Tre Fontane; Referee: Frida Klarlund (Denmark)

30 January 2024 6	Bayern Munich (Germany)	2–2	(France) Paris Saint-Germain	Munich, Germany
21:00 UTC+1	Gwinn 36'; Lohmann 75'	Report	Chawinga 73'; Stanway 88' (o.g.)	Stadium: FC Bayern Campus; Referee: Ewa Augustyn (Poland)

=== Overall record ===
Competition	First match	Last match	Starting round	Final position	Record							
Competition	First match	Last match	Starting round	Final position	Pld	W	D	L	GF	GA	GD	Win %
Frauen-Bundesliga	15 September 2023	20 May 2024	Matchday 1	Winners	22	19	3	0	60	8	+52	86.36
DFB-Pokal Frauen	10 September 2023	9 May 2024	Second round	Runner-up	5	3	1	1	12	3	+9	60.00
UEFA Women's Champions League	15 November 2023	30 January 2024	Group stage	3rd	6	1	4	1	8	8	+0	16.67
Total					33	23	8	2	80	19	+61	69.70

Source: Competitions

== Roster, statistics, and transfers ==
=== Roster, appearances, and goals ===
As of match played on 20 May 2024

No.	Pos	Nat	Player	Total		Frauen-Bundesliga		DFB-Pokal Frauen		Women's Champions League	
No.	Pos	Nat	Player	Apps	Goals	Apps	Goals	Apps	Goals	Apps	Goals
22	GK	(Germany) GER	Maria Luisa Grohs	30	0	21	0	3	0	6	0
23	GK	(New Zealand) NZL	Erin Nayler	1	0	0+1	0	0	0	0	0
41	GK	(Germany) GER	Anna Wellmann	3	0	1	0	2	0	0	0
44	GK	(Iceland) ISL	Cecilía Rán Rúnarsdóttir	0	0	0	0	0	0	0	0
2	DF	(Sweden) SWE	Linda Sembrant	13	1	9+1	1	3	0	0	0
3	DF	(France) FRA	Inès Belloumou	12	0	1+8	0	1	0	0+2	0
4	DF	(Iceland) ISL	Glódís Perla Viggósdóttir	33	1	22	1	5	0	6	0
5	DF	(Sweden) SWE	Magdalena Eriksson	19	5	11+2	4	1+2	0	3	1
6	DF	(Norway) NOR	Tuva Hansen	21	0	5+9	0	2+3	0	2	0
7	DF	(Germany) GER	Giulia Gwinn	28	4	18+1	3	3	0	6	1
8	DF	(Germany) GER	Maximiliane Rall	2	0	0+1	0	0	0	0+1	0
13	DF	(Brazil) BRA	Tainara	9	0	3+2	0	1	0	1+2	0
19	DF	(Austria) AUT	Katharina Naschenweng	27	3	17	3	4	0	6	0
30	DF	(Germany) GER	Carolin Simon	3	1	2	1	0+1	0	0	0
10	MF	(Germany) GER	Linda Dallmann	31	7	12+9	7	0+5	0	5	0
12	MF	(Germany) GER	Sydney Lohmann	28	3	9+9	1	1+3	1	3+3	1
14	MF	(Germany) GER	Alara Şehitler	6	1	0+3	0	1+1	1	0+1	0
16	MF	(Germany) GER	Lina Magull	13	0	4+4	0	0+1	0	0+4	0
18	MF	(Netherlands) NED	Jill Baijings	19	1	2+12	0	2+2	1	0+1	0
25	MF	(Austria) AUT	Sarah Zadrazil	28	0	18+1	0	2+1	0	6	0
26	MF	(Scotland) SCO	Samantha Kerr	17	0	4+9	0	3	0	0+1	0
31	MF	(England) ENG	Georgia Stanway	32	7	21	6	4+1	1	6	0
9	FW	(Serbia) SRB	Jovana Damnjanović	32	13	11+10	8	4+1	4	4+2	1
11	FW	(Germany) GER	Lea Schüller	30	14	18+3	11	4	0	5	3
17	FW	(Germany) GER	Klara Bühl	29	4	18+3	4	4	0	4	0
20	FW	(Germany) GER	Franziska Kett	14	0	1+7	0	1+1	0	1+3	0
21	FW	(Denmark) DEN	Pernille Harder	22	13	13+1	9	4+1	4	2+1	0
24	FW	(Poland) POL	Weronika Zawistowska	0	0	0	0	0	0	0	0

=== Goalscorers ===
As of match played on 20 May 2024

Rank	Name	Frauen-Bundesliga	DFB-Pokal Frauen	UWCL	Total
1	(Germany) Lea Schüller	11	0	3	14
2	(Serbia) Jovana Damnjanović	8	4	1	13
2	(Denmark) Pernille Harder	9	4	0	13
4	(Germany) Linda Dallmann	7	0	0	7
4	(England) Georgia Stanway	6	1	0	7
6	(Sweden) Magdalena Eriksson	4	0	1	5
7	(Germany) Klara Bühl	4	0	0	4
7	(Germany) Giulia Gwinn	3	0	1	4
9	(Germany) Sydney Lohmann	1	1	1	3
9	(Austria) Katharina Naschenweng	3	0	0	3
11	(Netherlands) Jill Baijings	0	1	0	1
11	(Germany) Alara Şehitler	0	1	0	1
11	(Sweden) Linda Sembrant	1	0	0	1
11	(Germany) Carolin Simon	1	0	0	1
11	(Iceland) Glódís Perla Viggósdóttir	1	0	0	1
Total		59	12	7	78

=== Disciplinary record ===
As of match played on 20 May 2024

Name	Frauen-Bundesliga		DFB-Pokal Frauen		UWCL		Total	
Name	Yellow card	Red card	Yellow card	Red card	Yellow card	Red card	Yellow card	Red card
(England) Georgia Stanway	6	0	2	0	2	0	10	0
(Germany) Sydney Lohmann	2	0	0	0	3	0	5	0
(Serbia) Jovana Damnjanović	3	0	0	0	1	0	4	0
(Germany) Giulia Gwinn	2	0	1	0	0	0	3	0
(Denmark) Pernille Harder	3	0	0	0	0	0	3	0
(Austria) Katharina Naschenweng	2	0	0	0	1	0	3	0
(France) Inès Belloumou	1	0	1	0	0	0	2	0
(Germany) Linda Dallmann	1	0	1	0	0	0	2	0
(Germany) Franziska Kett	2	0	0	0	0	0	2	0
(Germany) Lina Magull	1	0	0	0	1	0	2	0
(Iceland) Glódís Perla Viggósdóttir	2	0	0	0	0	0	2	0
(Netherlands) Jill Baijings	0	0	1	0	0	0	1	0
(Sweden) Magdalena Eriksson	0	0	1	0	0	0	1	0
(Germany) Maria Luisa Grohs	0	0	0	0	1	0	1	0
(Sweden) Linda Sembrant	0	0	1	0	0	0	1	0
(Germany) Lea Schüller	1	0	0	0	0	0	1	0
(Austria) Sarah Zadrazil	0	0	0	0	1	0	1	0
Jérôme Reisacher (a.c.)	0	0	0	0	1	0	1	0
Alexander Straus (man.)	0	0	0	0	1	0	1	0
Total	29	0	8	0	12	0	49	0

=== Clean sheets ===
As of match played on 20 May 2024

Rank	Name	Frauen-Bundesliga	DFB-Pokal Frauen	UWCL	Total
1	(Germany) Maria Luisa Grohs	14	1	1	16
2	(Germany) Anna Wellmann	0	2	0	2
Total		15 (Note: The clean sheet in the home game against 1. FC Nürnberg which has been achieved after goalkeeper substitution is counted but not attributed to any individual player.)	3	1	19

=== Transfers ===
Transferred In
Pos.	Name	Age	EU	Moving from	Type	Transfer Window	Ref.
Defender	Katharina Naschenweng	25	Yes	TSG Hoffenheim	Transfer	Summer	
Midfielder	Alara Şehitler	16	Yes	FV Ravensburg	Contract signing	Summer	
Forward	Weronika Zawistowska	23	Yes	1. FC Köln	Loan return	Summer	
Midfielder	Sam Kerr	24	No	Rangers	Transfer	Summer	
Forward	Pernille Harder	30	Yes	Chelsea	Transfer	Summer	
Defender	Magdalena Eriksson	29	Yes	Chelsea	Transfer	Summer	
Goalkeeper	Anna Wellmann	28	Yes	Turbine Potsdam	Transfer	Summer	
Midfielder	Jill Baijings	22	Yes	Bayer Leverkusen	Transfer	Summer	
Defender	Inès Belloumou	22	Yes	Montpellier	Transfer	Summer	
Forward	Natalia Padilla	20	Yes	Servette	Transfer	Summer	
Goalkeeper	Erin Nayler	31	No	Norrköping	Transfer	Summer	
Defender	Linda Sembrant	36	Yes	Juventus	Loan	Winter	

Transferred Out
Pos.	Name	Age	EU	Moving to	Type	Transfer Window	Ref.
Defender	Hanna Glas	30	Yes	Kansas City Current	Transfer	Summer	
Goalkeeper	Laura Benkarth	30	Yes	Lyon	End of contract	Summer	
Forward	Ivana Rudelić	31	Yes	FC Basel	End of contract	Summer	
Defender	Saki Kumagai	32	No	Roma	End of contract	Summer	
Forward	Emelyne Laurent	24	Yes	AC Milan	End of contract	Summer	
Defender	Emilie Bragstad	21	No	Bayer Leverkusen	Loan	Summer	
Defender	Carina Wenninger	32	Yes	—	Retired	Summer	
Forward	Karolina Vilhjalmsdottir	21	No	Bayer Leverkusen	Loan	Summer	
Goalkeeper	Janina Leitzig	24	Yes	Leicester City	Transfer	Summer	
Forward	Natalia Padilla	20	Yes	1. FC Köln	Loan	Summer	
Midfield	Lina Magull	29	Yes	Inter Milan	Transfer	Winter	

== Coaching staff ==
Position	Coach
Head coach:	Alexander Straus
Assistant coach:	Jérôme Reisacher
Assistant coach:	Moritz Volz
Goalkeeping coach:	Michael Netolitzky
Athletic coach:	Hamid Beygi

== FC Bayern Munich II (women) ==
As a 2023–24 2. Frauen-Bundesliga club, the women's reserve team received a licence to play in the 2. Frauen-Bundesliga. Bayern Munich II started their season against SV Weinberg on 20 August 2023 which finished in a 1–1 draw.
