= Jule Brand =

German footballer (born 2002)

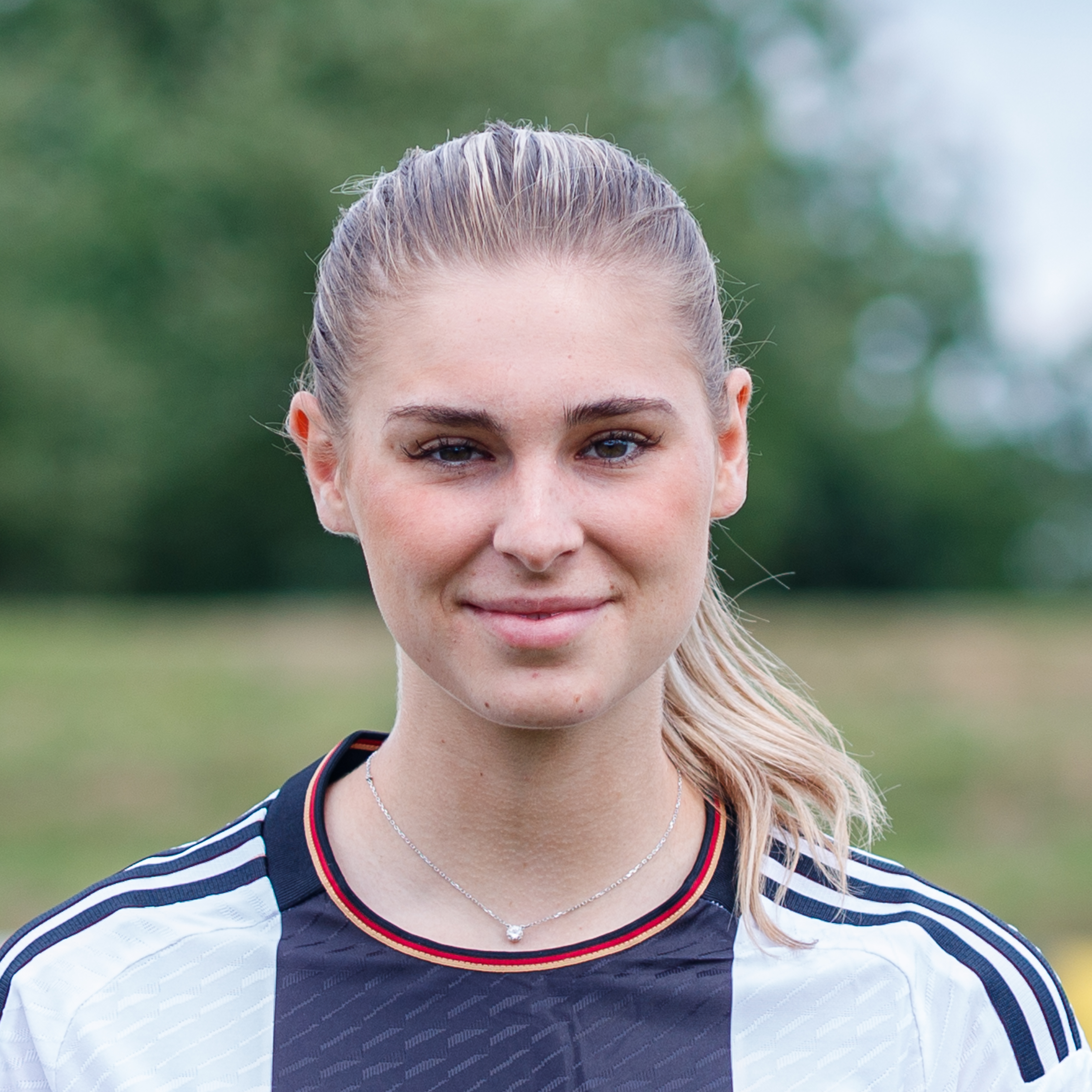
- Brand with Germany in 2023

Personal information
- Full name: Jule Brand
- Date of birth: 16 October 2002 (age 24)
- Place of birth: Germersheim, Germany
- Height: 1.77 m (5 ft 10 in)
- Positions: Attacking midfielder; forward; fullback

Team information
- Current team: Lyon
- Number: 29

Youth career
- 2017–2018: FC Speyer 09
- 2018: TSG Hoffenheim

Senior career*
Years	Team	Apps	(Gls)
2018–2020	TSG Hoffenheim II	37	(3)
2020–2022	TSG Hoffenheim	44	(8)
2022–2025	VfL Wolfsburg	62	(12)
2025–	Lyon	28	(5)

International career^{‡}
2018	Germany U16	3	(0)
2018–2019	Germany U17	9	(1)
2019–2020	Germany U19	5	(0)
2021–	Germany	77	(13)
Medal record
Women's football
Representing Germany
Olympic Games
Bronze medal – third place	2024 Paris	Team
UEFA Women's Championship
Runner-up	2022 England
UEFA Women's Nations League
Runner-up	2025
Third place	2024
UEFA Women's Under-17 Championship
Winner	2019 Bulgaria
- * Club domestic league appearances and goals as of 21:03, 21 November 2026 (UTC) ‡ National team caps and goals as of 21:10, 13 October 2026 (UTC)

Jule Brand (born 16 October 2002) is a German professional footballer who plays as a fullback or as an attacking midfielder or forward for Première Ligue club Lyon and the Germany national team.

== Club career ==
Brand had played in boys' teams at FV Dudenhofen and JSG JFV Ganerb before moving up to the youth department of TSG Hoffenheim in the winter of 2018, via the FC Speyer 09 juniors side. There, she played in the U17s and then in the 2. Frauen-Bundesliga with the U20s. After 37 league games with Hoffenheim II, Brand joined the first team in 2020.

=== TSG Hoffenheim ===
She helped TSG Hoffenheim finish third in the 2020–21 Frauen-Bundesliga. After progressing through the 2021–22 Champions League qualifying rounds, Hoffenheim narrowly missed out on a quarter-final spot as they finished third in Group C, level on points with 2nd-placed Arsenal. Brand played nine times and scored three goals in her debut UEFA Women's Champions League campaign.

She was featured in every league game for Hoffenheim during her two years with the senior team. In 2022, Brand won the Golden Girl award for being the most impressive female player aged under 21 in Europe's top leagues.

=== VfL Wolfsburg ===
In February 2022, VfL Wolfsburg announced they had completed the signing of Brand on a three-year deal for an undisclosed fee, with the player to join in the summer. Brand won her first trophy in May 2023 as Wolfsburg claimed the 2022–23 DFB-Pokal Frauen, where she came on as a late substitute in the final.

Jule lifted the same cup for a second time in the following season and scored the opening goal of the final as Wolfsburg beat Bayern Munich 2–0 at the RheinEnergieStadion. Brand scored five goals in the 2023–24 DFB-Pokal Frauen to end as the tournament's joint-highest scorer, alongside teammate Vivien Endemann. In May 2025, Wolfsburg announced that Brand will leave the team at the end of the 2024–25 season.

=== OL Lyonnes ===
On 22 May 2025, it was announced that Brand will join Première Ligue team OL Lyonnes ahead of the 2025–26 season until June 30, 2028. The German scored her first goal for Lyon on 15 October, netting the opener as the French side beat St. Pölten 3–0 in the UEFA Women's Champions League. On 2 May 2026, Brand scored the winning goal as Lyon beat Arsenal 4–3 on aggregate to qualify for the 2026 UEFA Women's Champions League final.

== International career ==
=== Youth ===
In 2015 and 2016, Brand played eight games for the Southwest U14 in the national cup. In 2017 and 2018, she played for the Baden U16 and U18 as well as the Southwest U16 and the German U16 team in the national cup. Brand also participated in the Nordic Cup with Germany's U16s. With the U17 team, she qualified for the 2019 UEFA European Championship.

At the tournament in Bulgaria, she played at right-back in Germany's first two group stage matches; a 4–0 win against England and a 3–2 defeat by the Netherlands. Brand was suspended for the third group game, but returned to the line-up as a left-winger in the 2-0 semi-final victory over Portugal. In the final, Brand started and played 76 minutes as Germany met the Netherlands again, beating Jong-Oranje this time 3-2 on penalties (1-1 after extra-time) to win U17 Euro 2019. Germany won the title for the seventh time, with their goalkeeper Pauline Nelles starring and the two 'keepers saving a total of seven penalties between them.

Five games followed with the U19s, in March 2020 at a tournament in La Manga. Due to the COVID-19 pandemic, the U19 European Championship qualifiers and its final rounds were cancelled, meaning Brand was not able to play any competitive games for the U19s. Jule's impressive rise saw her awarded with the Fritz Walter Gold Medal in 2021, the DfB's top prize for youth footballers in Germany.

=== Senior ===
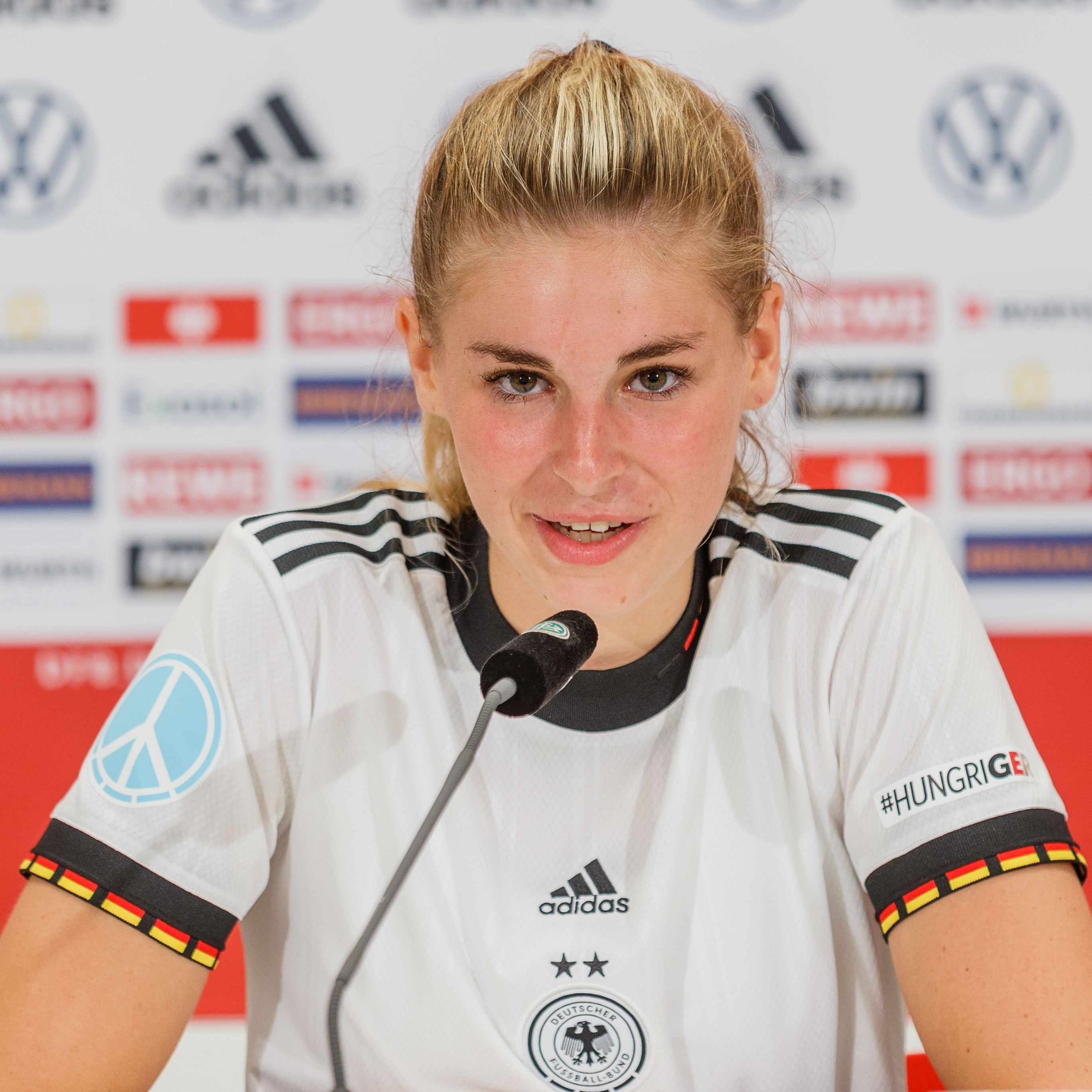
Brand at a post-match press conference in June 2022

In April 2021, after Melanie Leupolz and Klara Bühl had to miss the games against Australia and Norway due to muscular problems and minor injuries, she was called up for the two games of the senior national team. On 10 April, against Australia, she came on as a 60th minute substitute for Tabea Waßmuth. Two minutes later, she was able to beat Clare Polkinghorne in a running duel and score her first international goal, before assisting the fourth goal scored by Laura Freigang in the 65th minute. In qualifying for the 2023 World Cup, she played in all six games and scored three goals across the games against Israel and Turkey.

For Euro 2022, which was held in England, she was called up to the squad by the national coach Martina Voss-Tecklenburg. The German team reached the final, but lost 2-1 to England after extra-time and finished as runners-up. Brand was used in all six games.

On 3 July, 2024, Brand was called up to the Germany squad for the 2024 Summer Olympics. Brand helped Germany win a bronze medal in the Olympic women's football event at the Games in Paris. She started all six of the team's matches at the tournament and scored in their opening 3-0 win over Australia. Germany beat world champions Spain 1-0 in Lyon in the Bronze medal match.

On 12 June, 2025, Brand was selected by the national coach Christian Wück for the UEFA Women's Euro 2025. The team reached the semi-finals where they were eliminated by Spain. Brand was a starter in all matches and scored two goals.

== Career statistics ==
=== Club ===
As of match played 14 November 2026

Appearances and goals by club, season and competition
Club	Season	League			National cup (Note: Includes DFB-Pokal, Coupe de France)		Continental		Other		Total	
Club	Season	Division	Apps	Goals	Apps	Goals	Apps	Goals	Apps	Goals	Apps	Goals
TSG Hoffenheim II	2018–19	2. Frauen-Bundesliga	21	1	—		—		—		21	1
TSG Hoffenheim II	2019–20	2. Frauen-Bundesliga	16	2	—		—		—		16	2
TSG Hoffenheim II	Total		37	3	—		—		—		37	3
TSG Hoffenheim	2020–21	Frauen-Bundesliga	22	4	3	1	—		—		25	5
TSG Hoffenheim	2021–22	Frauen-Bundesliga	22	4	2	1	9 (Note: Appearances in UEFA Women's Champions League)	3	—		33	8
TSG Hoffenheim	Total		44	8	5	2	9	3	—		58	13
VfL Wolfsburg	2022–23	Frauen-Bundesliga	21	3	4	2	10	1	—		35	6
VfL Wolfsburg	2023–24	Frauen-Bundesliga	22	4	5	5	2	0	—		29	9
VfL Wolfsburg	2024–25	Frauen-Bundesliga	19	5	1	0	10	2	1 (Note: Appearance in DFB-Supercup)	0	31	7
VfL Wolfsburg	Total		62	12	10	7	22	3	1	0	95	22
OL Lyonnes	2025–26	Première Ligue	20	4	4	1	11	3	3 (Note: Appearances in Coupe LFFP)	0	38	8
OL Lyonnes	2026–27	Première Ligue	8	1	0	0	4	0	0	0	11	1
OL Lyonnes	Total		28	5	4	1	15	3	3	0	49	9
Career total			171	28	19	10	46	9	4	0	240	47

=== International ===
As of match played 13 October 2026

Appearances and goals by national team and year
National team	Year	Apps	Goals
Germany	2021	10	4
Germany	2022	17	2
Germany	2023	12	1
Germany	2024	16	2
Germany	2025	14	1
Germany	2026	8	2
Total		77	13

Scores and results list Germany's goal tally first, score column indicates score after each Brand goal.

List of international goals scored by Jule Brand
No.	Date	Venue	Opponent	Score	Result	Competition
1	10 April 2021	Brita-Arena, Wiesbaden, Germany	Australia	3–0	5–2	Friendly
2	26 October 2021	Stadion Essen, Essen, Germany	Israel	1–0	7–0	2023 FIFA Women's World Cup qualification
3	26 October 2021	Stadion Essen, Essen, Germany	Israel	4–0	7–0	2023 FIFA Women's World Cup qualification
4	26 November 2021	Eintracht-Stadion. Braunschweig, Germany	Turkey	4–0	8–0	2023 FIFA Women's World Cup qualification
5	24 June 2022	Steigerwaldstadion, Erfurt, Germany	Switzerland	6–0	7–0	Friendly
6	13 November 2022	Red Bull Arena, Harrison, United States	United States	1–0	1–2	Friendly
7	11 April 2023	Max-Morlock-Stadion, Nuremberg, Germany	Brazil	1–2	1–2	Friendly
8	16 July 2024	Niedersachsenstadion, Hanover, Germany	Austria	2–0	4–0	UEFA Women's Euro 2025 qualifying
9	25 July 2024	Stade Vélodrome, Marseille, France	Australia	3–0	3–0	2024 Summer Olympics
10	4 July 2025	Kybunpark, St. Gallen, Switzerland	Poland	1–0	2–0	UEFA Women's Euro 2025
11	12 July 2025	Stadion Letzigrund, Zurich, Switzerland	Sweden	1–0	1–4	UEFA Women's Euro 2025
12	7 March 2026	Lyse Arena, Stavanger, Norway	Norway	4–0	4–0	2027 FIFA World Cup qualification
13	14 April 2026	Max-Morlock-Stadion, Nuremberg, Germany	Austria	4–0	5–1	2027 FIFA World Cup qualification

== Honours ==
VfL Wolfsburg

- DFB-Pokal Frauen: 2022–23, 2023–24
- UEFA Women's Champions League runner-up: 2022–23

Lyon

- Première Ligue: 2025–26
- Coupe de France Féminine: 2025–26
- Coupe LFFP: 2025–26

Germany U17

- UEFA Women's Under-17 Championship: 2019

Germany

- Summer Olympics bronze medal: 2024
- UEFA Championship runner-up: 2022
- UEFA Women's Nations League third place: 2023–24

Individual

- Golden Girl: 2022
- Fritz Walter Medal Gold (U19): 2021
- Silbernes Lorbeerblatt: 2024
- UEFA Women's Championship Team of the Tournament: 2025
