= Yazid Heimur =

German footballer

Personal information
- Date of birth: 18 November 2002 (age 23)
- Position: Midfielder

Youth career
- –2020: Tennis Borussia Berlin
- 2020–2021: Viktoria Berlin

Senior career*
| Years | Team | Apps | (Gls) |
| 2021 | Viktoria Berlin | 1 | (0) |
- * Club domestic league appearances and goals as of 16:04, 5 January 2022 (UTC)

Yazid Heimur (born 18 November 2002) is a German professional footballer who most recently played as a midfielder for club Viktoria Berlin.

== Career ==
Heimur was one of four players to leave 3. Liga club Viktoria Berlin in the winter transfer window 2021–22 due to "personal reasons".
