= Giulia Gwinn =

German footballer

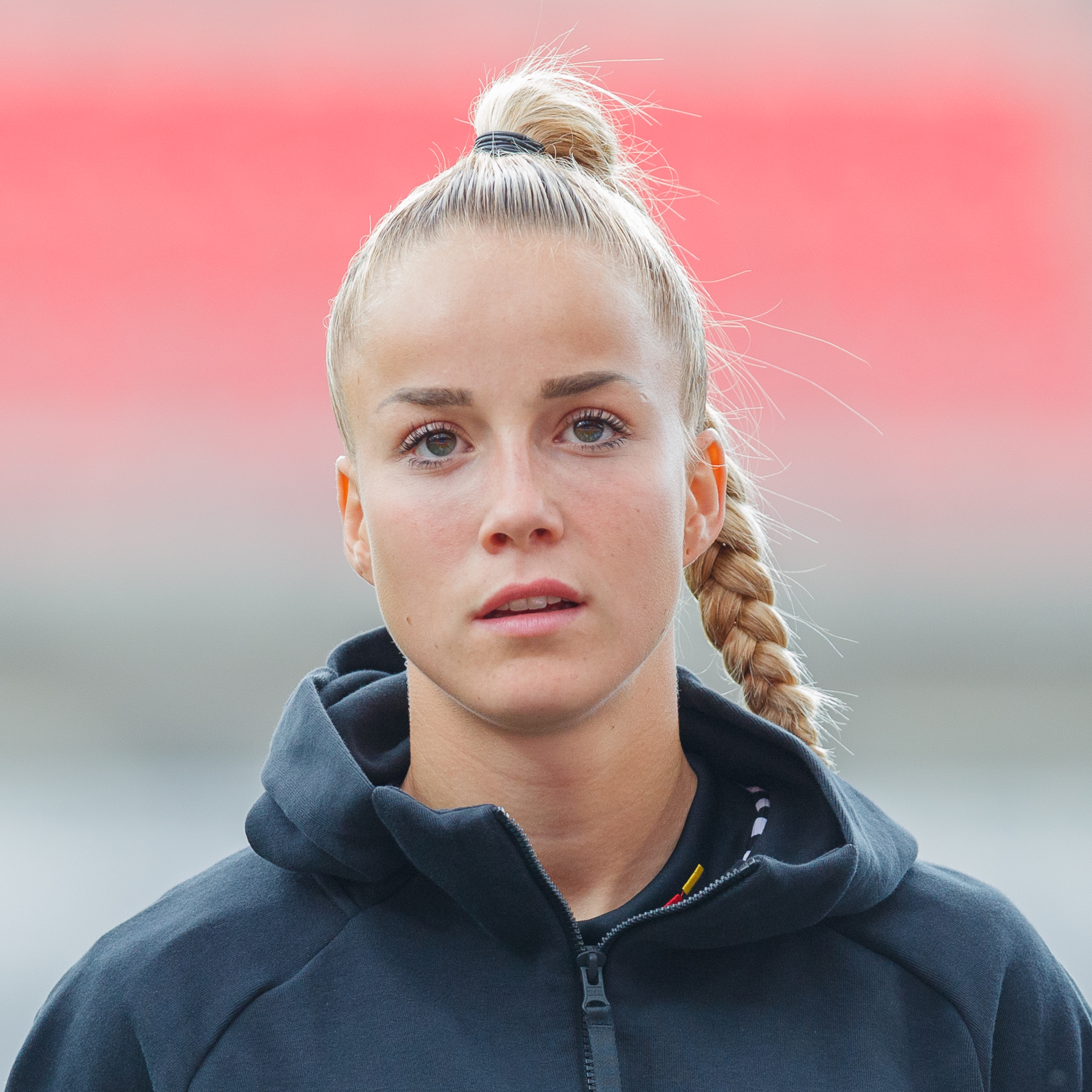
- Gwinn with Germany in 2022

Personal information
- Full name: Giulia Ronja Gwinn
- Date of birth: 2 July 1999 (age 27)
- Place of birth: Tettnang, Germany
- Height: 1.72 m (5 ft 8 in)
- Positions: Right-back; midfielder

Team information
- Current team: Bayern Munich
- Number: 7

Youth career
- TSG Ailingen
- VfB Friedrichshafen
- 2009–2014: FV Ravensburg
- 2014–2015: SV Weingarten
- 2015–2016: SC Freiburg

Senior career*
Years	Team	Apps	(Gls)
2015–2019	SC Freiburg	71	(22)
2019–	Bayern Munich	100	(14)

International career^{‡}
2013	Germany U15	6	(2)
2014	Germany U16	3	(2)
2015–2016	Germany U17	27	(9)
2017	Germany U19	10	(6)
2017–2018	Germany U20	6	(1)
2017–	Germany	71	(14)
Medal record
Olympic Games
Bronze medal – third place	2024 Paris	Team
UEFA Women's Championship
Silver medal – second place	2022 England
UEFA Women's Nations League
Bronze medal – third place	2024 France–Netherlands–Spain
- * Club domestic league appearances and goals as of 14 November 2026 ‡ National team caps and goals as of 19:05, 14 April 2026 (UTC)

Giulia Ronja Gwinn (German pronunciation: [ɡvɪn]; born 2 July 1999) is a German professional footballer who plays as a right-back or a midfielder for Frauen-Bundesliga club Bayern Munich and captains the Germany women's national team.

== Early life ==
Gwinn started playing football at the age of eight for TSG Ailingen and later for VfB Friedrichshafen. In 2009, she began a five-year spell at FV Ravensburg. She then played a season for the B-Juniors of SV Weingarten, as the only girl in the team.

== Club career ==
In 2015, Gwinn joined Frauen-Bundesliga team SC Freiburg for the 2015–16 season at the age of 16 years. She had initially agreed to sign for Freiburg in February 2015, rejecting competing offers from Bayern Munich and Turbine Potsdam. On 13 September 2015, (3rd Round) she debuted in a 6–1 home win over 1. FC Köln. She substituted in for Sandra Starke, making her Bundesliga debut as a 16-year-old. A month later, on 11 October 2015 (5th Round), in the match against Werder Bremen, was her first time in the starting lineup. On 6 December 2015 (10th matchday) she scored in a 6–1 home win over Bayer Leverkusen.

On 25 February 2019, Gwinn agreed terms with Bayern Munich which would see her leave Freiburg at the end of the 2018–19 season.

Giulia was part of the Bayern side which won the 2020–21 Frauen-Bundesliga title and went a record-breaking 44 league matches unbeaten from December 2021 to October 2024, winning both the 2022–23 and 2023–24 league titles respectively along the way.

In July 2024, Gwinn extended her contract to stay at Bayern until 2027. Despite having to recover from two anterior cruciate ligament (ACL) injuries both suffered whilst on international duty in 2020 and 2022 respectively, Gwinn established herself as one of Bayern's leading players.

== International career ==
=== Youth ===
Gwinn has represented Germany on the under-15, under-16, under-17, under-19 and under-20 national teams. At the age of 13 years, she was called up by coach Bettina Wiegmann for under-15 national team training in November 2012. She made her debut for the U-15 national team in April 2013, a substitute in an 8–0 win over the Netherlands. She made three appearances for the under-16 national team in 2014. In 2015, she was the youngest player in the U-17 national team squad for the European Championship in Iceland where the team reached the semi-finals but were defeated 0–1 by the Swiss selection. UEFA's technical report noted that Gwinn's pace on the right wing had been a positive feature of Germany's play. In May 2016, the team won the 2016 UEFA Women's Under-17 Championship after a penalty shootout against Spain in Belarus. The four Freiburg players in the squad contributed seven of Germany's 10 goals at the tournament and two of them, including Gwinn, successfully converted their kicks in the shootout.

At the 2016 FIFA U-17 Women's World Cup in Jordan, Gwinn helped Germany beat Venezuela 2–1 in their opening match earning her the "Player of the Match" award. She scored the first goal with a volley, then assisted on the second. Entering the tournament with 23 Under-17 caps and as a first team player with Freiburg, Gwinn was considered one of the pillars of the team. In the Germans' second match against Canada, Gwinn's direct free kick salvaged a 1–1 draw. In the third match, Gwinn scored a goal in Germany's victory over Cameroon.

She played in the 2017 UEFA Women's Under-19 Championship (scoring a goal against Scotland) in Northern Ireland where she reached the semi-final and with this she qualified for the 2018 FIFA U-20 Women's World Cup (where scored a goal against China and was named "Player of the Match" against Nigeria).

=== Senior ===
On 14 May 2019, Gwinn was named to the 2019 FIFA Women's World Cup German squad. In her FIFA Women's World Cup debut, she secured the win for Germany in their opening game of the 2019 FIFA Women's World Cup by scoring the only goal in a 1–0 group-stage victory over China. She was named "Player of the Match" for her contribution.

The German World Cup campaign ended in the quarterfinals after a 2–1 loss to Sweden. Gwinn was later awarded with the Best Young Player Award for her performance at the tournament. After a remarkable rise and aged just 20, Gwinn was named as Germany's 2019 Female Player of the Year. On 19 September 2020, Gwinn tore the anterior cruciate ligament in her right knee during a 3-0 UEFA Women's Euro 2022 qualifying win over the Republic of Ireland and she was sidelined with the injury for almost one year.

On 18 June 2022, Gwinn was called up to the 23-player Germany squad for the UEFA Women's Euro 2022. For Euro 2022, which was held in England, Gwinn was a key player for the German national team, starting all six games and providing one assist. In the final, Germany lost 2–1 to England after extra-time and finished as runners-up. She was named in the UEFA Women's Euro 2022 Team of the Tournament.

After suffering a second anterior cruciate ligament injury in October 2022, Gwinn was ruled out of the 2023 FIFA Women's World Cup.

On 3 July 2024, Gwinn was called up to the Germany squad for the 2024 Summer Olympics. Gwinn helped Germany win a bronze medal in the Olympic women's football event at the Games in Paris. She started all six of the team's matches at the tournament, scoring two goals and assisting two more. The defender scored the only goal of the Bronze medal match in Lyon, a 65th-minute penalty, as the Germans beat world champions Spain 1–0.

Gwinn won the German women's Player of the Year award for the second time in 2024. In February 2025, Gwinn was appointed as captain of the Germany national team.

Gwinn was named in the German squad for the UEFA Women's Euro 2025. On 4 July 2025, she sustained medial ligament damage to her left knee during the opening match against Poland, ruling her out for the remainder of the tournament. Together with teammate Ann-Katrin Berger, Gwinn won Germany's Women's Footballer of the Year award for 2025.

== Career statistics ==
=== Club ===
As of match played 19 November 2026

Appearances and goals by club, season and competition
Club	Season	League			DFB Pokal		Continental (Note: Includes UEFA Champions League)		Other (Note: Includes DFB-Supercup)		Total	
Club	Season	Division	Apps	Goals	Apps	Goals	Apps	Goals	Apps	Goals	Apps	Goals
SC Freiburg	2015–16	Frauen-Bundesliga	10	2	3	2	–		–		13	4
SC Freiburg	2016–17	Frauen-Bundesliga	20	5	3	0	–		–		23	5
SC Freiburg	2017–18	Frauen-Bundesliga	19	7	2	0	–		–		21	7
SC Freiburg	2018–19	Frauen-Bundesliga	22	8	4	5	–		–		26	13
SC Freiburg	Total		71	22	12	7	–		–		83	29
Bayern Munich	2019–20	Frauen-Bundesliga	14	1	0	0	3	0	–		17	1
Bayern Munich	2020–21	Frauen-Bundesliga	2	0	0	0	0	0	–		2	0
Bayern Munich	2021–22	Frauen-Bundesliga	20	5	4	1	7	1	–		31	7
Bayern Munich	2022–23	Frauen-Bundesliga	3	1	1	1	2	0	–		6	2
Bayern Munich	2023–24	Frauen-Bundesliga	19	3	3	0	6	1	–		28	4
Bayern Munich	2024–25	Frauen-Bundesliga	19	0	4	1	8	1	1	0	32	2
Bayern Munich	2025–26	Frauen-Bundesliga	17	3	5	0	9	0	–		31	3
Bayern Munich	2026–27	Frauen-Bundesliga	6	1	1	0	4	1	0	0	11	2
Bayern Munich	Total		100	14	16	3	39	4	1	0	155	21
Career total			171	36	30	10	39	4	1	0	241	50

=== International ===
As of match played 14 April 2026

Appearances and goals by national team and year
National team	Year	Apps	Goals
Germany	2017	1	0
Germany	2018	3	1
Germany	2019	13	2
Germany	2020	2	0
Germany	2021	2	0
Germany	2022	12	0
Germany	2023	6	3
Germany	2024	18	8
Germany	2025	11	0
Germany	2026	3	0
Total		71	14

Scores and results list Germany's goal tally first, score column indicates score after each Gwinn goal.

List of international goals scored by Giulia Gwinn
No.	Date	Venue	Opponent	Score	Result	Competition
1	10 November 2018	Osnabrück, Germany	Italy	3–2	5–2	Friendly
2	8 June 2019	Rennes, France	China	1–0	1–0	2019 FIFA World Cup
3	5 October 2019	Aachen, Germany	Ukraine	2–0	8–0	UEFA Women's Euro 2021 qualifying
4	26 September 2023	Bochum, Germany	Iceland	2–0	4–0	2023–24 UEFA Women's Nations League
5	27 October 2023	Sinsheim, Germany	Wales	3–1	5–1	2023–24 UEFA Women's Nations League
6	31 October 2023	Reykjavík, Iceland	Iceland	1–0	2–0	2023–24 UEFA Women's Nations League
7	23 February 2024	Décines-Charpieu, France	France	1–2	1–2	2023–24 UEFA Women's Nations League
8	5 April 2024	Linz, Austria	Austria	3–2	3–2	UEFA Women's Euro 2025 qualifying
9	31 May 2024	Rostock, Germany	Poland	3–1	4–1	UEFA Women's Euro 2025 qualifying
10	31 May 2024	Rostock, Germany	Poland	4–1	4–1	UEFA Women's Euro 2025 qualifying
11	28 July 2024	Marseille, France	United States	1–1	1–4	2024 Summer Olympics
12	9 August 2024	Décines-Charpieu, France	Spain	1–0	1–0	2024 Summer Olympics
13	25 October 2024	London, England	England	1–0	4–3	Friendly
14	25 October 2024	London, England	England	2–0	4–3	Friendly

== Personal life ==
Gwinn is the youngest of four siblings.

She studied at the IU International University of Applied Sciences.

Gwinn was in a relationship with former footballer Constantin Frommann, but in July 2026 it was reported that they had broken up.

In 2025, Gwinn published her autobiography, Write your own story: Mein Weg vom Bolzplatz in die Weltspitze, co-written with journalist Julien Wolff. Gwinn stated that she hoped the book would inspire young girls to pursue their dreams, while also discussing the challenges she faced in women's football.

== Honours ==
Bayern Munich

- Frauen-Bundesliga: 2020–21, 2022–23, 2023–24, 2024–25, 2025–26
- DFB-Pokal: 2024–25, 2025–26
- DFB-Supercup: 2024

Germany U17

- UEFA Women's Under-17 Championship: 2016

Germany

- Summer Olympics bronze medal: 2024
- UEFA Women's Championship runner-up: 2022
- UEFA Women's Nations League third place: 2023–24

Individual

- FIFA Women's World Cup Best Young Player: 2019
- UEFA Women's Championship Team of the Tournament: 2022
- Silbernes Lorbeerblatt: 2024
- Germany women's national Player of the Year: 2019, 2024
- Women's Footballer of the Year (Germany): 2025 (together with Ann-Katrin Berger), 2026
