= Franziska Harsch =

German association football player

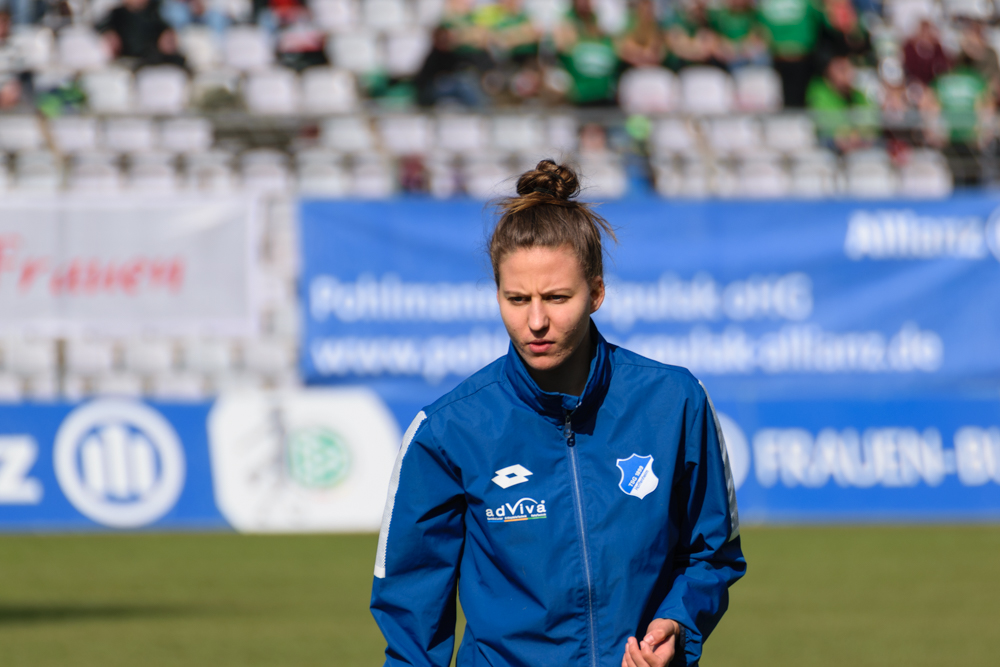

Personal information
- Full name: Franziska Dorothee Harsch
- Date of birth: 6 July 1997 (age 29)
- Place of birth: Birkach, Germany
- Height: 1.82 m (6 ft 0 in)
- Position: Midfielder

Team information
- Current team: TSG Hoffenheim
- Number: 17

Senior career*
Years	Team	Apps	(Gls)
2014–	TSG Hoffenheim	168	(9)
- * Club domestic league appearances and goals as of 14 November 2026

Franziska Harsch (born 6 July 1997) is a German footballer who plays as a midfielder for TSG 1899 Hoffenheim. She appeared at the 2014 FIFA U-17 Women's World Cup.
