= Stadion Lichterfelde =

Football stadium in Berlin (Germany)

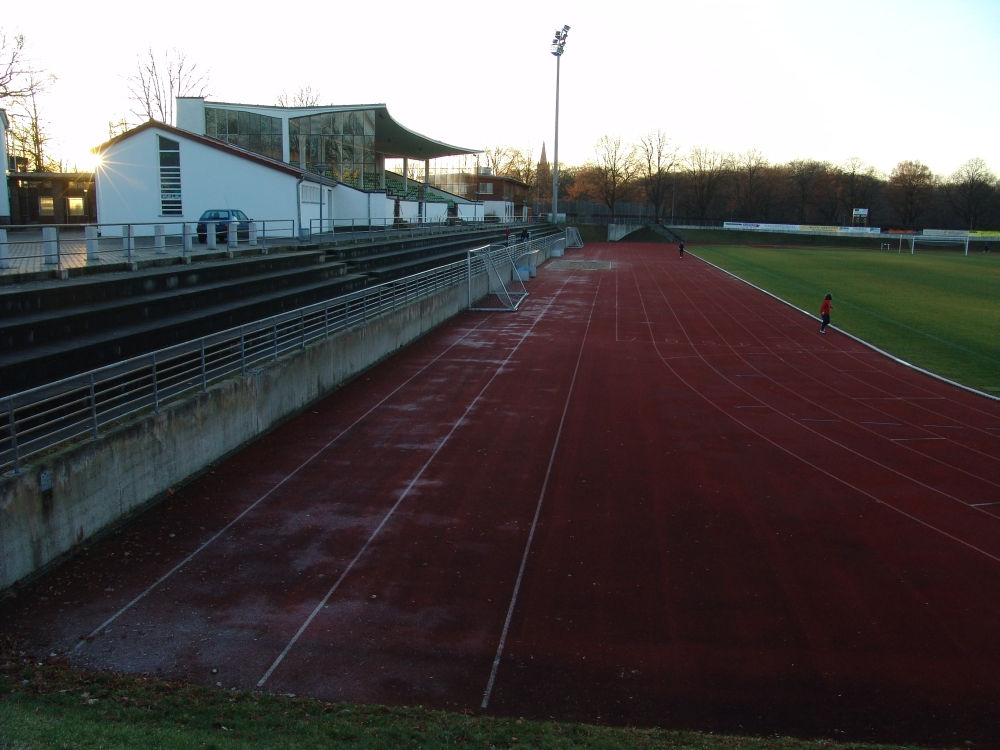
- Stadion Lichterfelde in 2008.
- Interactive map of Stadion Lichterfelde
- Location: Berlin, Germany
- Capacity: 4,300
- Surface: Grass

Construction
- Opened: 1929

Tenant
- FC Viktoria 1889 Berlin

The Lichterfelde Stadium is a football stadium in Berlin, Germany. It is home to FC Viktoria 1889 Berlin.

There are also six running lanes surrounding the field, which is a natural grass surface.

== History ==
On October 30, 1924, the Berlin city council decided to build a central playground and sports field for about 2.53 million euros in today's money. The work began in 1926.

The stadium was opened on June 16, 1929.

During the 2006 World Cup, the stadium served as a training facility for both the Swedish and Brazilian national teams.

For the World Athletics Championships in 2009, the stadium was given a new running track in blue color as well as a renewed throwing facility and served as a training facility for foreign athletes during the World Championships. The stadium was also selected by the German Football Association as a training stadium for the 2011 FIFA Women's World Cup.
