= Vivien Endemann =

German footballer (born 2001)

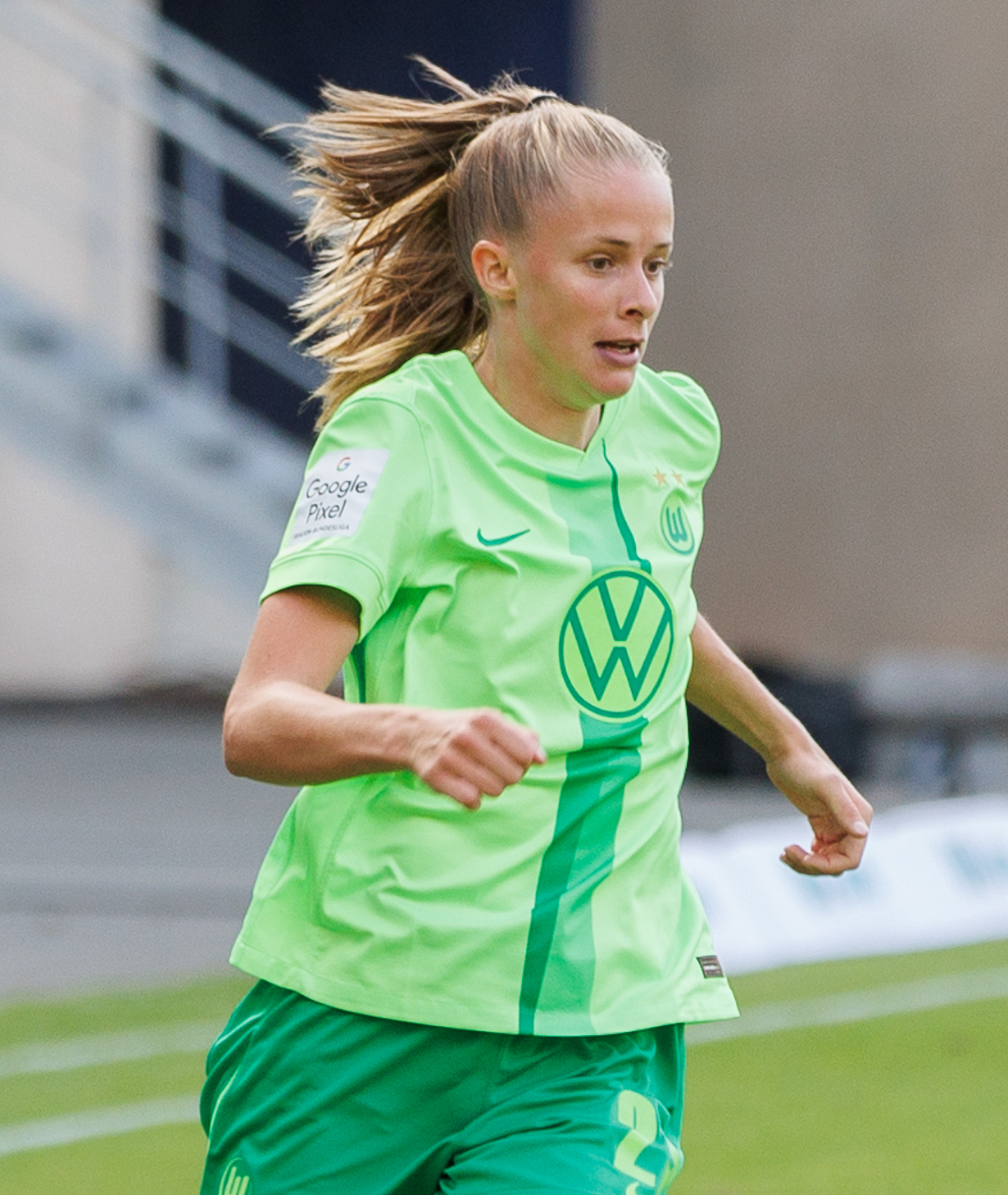
- Endemann with VfL Wolfsburg in 2024

Personal information
- Date of birth: 7 August 2001 (age 25)
- Place of birth: Lohne, Germany
- Height: 1.71 m (5 ft 7 in)
- Position: Forward

Team information
- Current team: Liverpool
- Number: 9

Youth career
- –2018: Werder Bremen

Senior career*
Years	Team	Apps	(Gls)
2017–2018	Werder Bremen II	5	(1)
2018–2019	TV Jahn Delmenhorst	21	(20)
2019–2021	SV Meppen	36	(7)
2021–2023	SGS Essen	44	(12)
2023–2026	VfL Wolfsburg	60	(15)
2026–	Liverpool	9	(3)

International career^{‡}
2020	Germany U19	3	(0)
2024–	Germany	21	(4)
Medal record
Olympic Games
Bronze medal – third place	2024 Paris	Team
UEFA Women's Nations League
Bronze medal – third place	2024 France–Netherlands–Spain
- * Club domestic league appearances and goals as of 21:10, 21 November 2026 (UTC) ‡ National team caps and goals as of 22:45, 9 June 2026 (UTC)

Vivien Endemann (born 7 August 2001) is a German professional footballer who plays as a forward for Women's Super League club Liverpool and the Germany national team.

== Club career ==
Endemann began her career at TV Dinklage and later moved to the youth department of Werder Bremen, where she played in the B-Junior Bundesliga. In the 2017–18 season, she made her first appearances for Werder's second team in the third-tier Regionalliga Nord. In the summer of 2018, Endemann moved to regional league club TV Jahn Delmenhorst and scored 20 goals in 21 games in the following 2018–19 season. This caught the attention of second division club SV Meppen, who signed Endemann. In the 2019–20 season, Meppen finished fourth. Since the better-placed second teams of VfL Wolfsburg and TSG 1899 Hoffenheim were not allowed to be promoted, SV Meppen was promoted to the Bundesliga. They narrowly missed out on staying in the league in the 2020–21 season, and Vivien Endemann moved to SGS Essen together with Maike Berentzen.

For the 2023–24 season she moved to VfL Wolfsburg.

On 10 April 2026, it was announced that Endemann would be signing for Women's Super League club Liverpool upon the expiry of her contract with Wolfsburg in the summer of 2026.

On 6 September 2026, she produced a goal and assist on her Liverpool debut, in a 4–0 away win over Charlton Athletic in their opening fixture of the 2025–26 Women's Super League season at The Valley.

== International career ==
In 2020, Endemann appeared for Germany at the youth (U19) level. On 28 February 2024, she played her first international match for the Germany national team in the UEFA third-place match against the Netherlands, resulting in a victory and Olympic qualification for Germany.

On 3 July 2024, Endemann was called up to the Germany squad for the 2024 Summer Olympics.

== Personal life ==
In June 2021, Endemann graduated from Marianum Meppen High School.

== Career statistics ==
=== Club ===
As of match played 14 November 2026

Appearances and goals by club, season and competition
Club	Season	League			National cup (Note: Includes DFB-Pokal, Women's FA Cup)		League cup (Note: includes Women's League Cup)		Continental		Other		Total	
Club	Season	Division	Apps	Goals	Apps	Goals	Apps	Goals	Apps	Goals	Apps	Goals	Apps	Goals
SV Werder Bremen II	2017–18	Regionalliga Nord	5	1	0	0	—		—		—		5	1
TV Jahn Delmenhorst	2018–19	Regionalliga Nord	21	20	2	0	—		—		—		23	20
SV Meppen	2019–20	2. Frauen-Bundesliga	14	4	1	1	—		—		—		15	5
SV Meppen	2020–21	2. Frauen-Bundesliga	22	3	3	0	—		—		—		25	3
SV Meppen	Total		36	7	4	1	0	0	0	0	0	0	40	8
SGS Essen	2021–22	Frauen-Bundesliga	22	7	3	1	—		—		—		25	8
SGS Essen	2022–23	Frauen-Bundesliga	22	5	3	3	—		—		—		25	8
SGS Essen	Total		44	12	6	4	0	0	0	0	0	0	50	16
VfL Wolfsburg	2023–24	Frauen-Bundesliga	21	9	5	5	—		2 (Note: Appearance(s) in UEFA Women's Champions League)	1	—		28	15
VfL Wolfsburg	2024–25	Frauen-Bundesliga	20	3	3	1	—		10	4	1 (Note: Appearance(s) in DFB-Supercup Frauen)	0	34	8
VfL Wolfsburg	2025–26	Frauen-Bundesliga	19	3	4	2	—		6	2	1	1	31	8
VfL Wolfsburg	Total		60	15	12	8	0	0	18	7	2	1	93	31
Liverpool	2026–27	Women's Super League	9	3	0	0	0	0	—		—		9	3
Career total			175	58	24	13	0	0	18	7	2	1	220	79

=== International ===
As of match played 9 June 2026

Appearances and goals by national team and year
National team	Year	Apps	Goals
Germany	2024	13	0
Germany	2025	2	1
Germany	2026	6	3
Total		21	4

Scores and results list Germany's goal tally first, score column indicates score after each Endemann goal.

List of international goals scored by Vivien Endemann
No.	Date	Venue	Opponent	Score	Result	Competition
1	25 February 2025	Max-Morlock-Stadion, Nuremberg, Germany	Austria	4–1	4–1	2025 UEFA Nations League
2	3 March 2026	Rudolf-Harbig-Stadion, Dresden, Germany	Slovenia	1–0	5–0	2027 FIFA World Cup qualification
3	7 March 2026	Lyse Arena, Stavanger, Norway	Norway	3–0	4–0	2027 FIFA World Cup qualification
4	14 April 2026	Max-Morlock-Stadion, Nuremberg, Germany	Austria	2–0	5–1	2027 FIFA World Cup qualification

== Honours ==
VfL Wolfsburg

- DFB Cup: 2023–24

Germany

- Summer Olympics bronze medal: 2024
- UEFA Women's Nations League third place: 2023–24

Individual

- Silbernes Lorbeerblatt: 2024
