= 2020–21 Frauen-Bundesliga =

Frauen-Bundesliga
- Season: 2020–21
- Dates: 4 September 2020 – 6 June 2021
- Champions: Bayern Munich
- Relegated: SV Meppen; MSV Duisburg
- Champions League: Bayern Munich; VfL Wolfsburg; 1899 Hoffenheim
- Matches: 132
- Goals: 460 (3.48 per match)
- Top goalscorer: Nicole Billa (23 goals)
- Biggest home win: Wolfsburg 8–0 Bremen
- Biggest away win: Sand 0–8 Munich
- Highest scoring: Bremen 5–3 Duisburg; Sand 0–8 Munich; Munich 7–1 Meppen; Wolfsburg 8–0 Bremen
- Longest winning run: 17 games Munich
- Longest unbeaten run: 17 games Munich
- Longest winless run: 20 games Duisburg
- Longest losing run: 5 games Bremen
- Attendance: 11,686 (89 per match) (Note: Due to the COVID-19 pandemic in Germany, each local health department allows a different number of spectators.)

The 2020–21 season of the Frauen-Bundesliga was the 31st season of Germany's premier women's football league. It ran from 4 September 2020 to 6 June 2021.

Seven time champion 1. FFC Frankfurt joined forces with Eintracht Frankfurt and competes under their name.

Bayern Munich won their third title.

The fixtures were announced on 27 July 2020.

== Effects of the COVID-19 pandemic ==
On 31 August 2020, the DFB Executive Committee decided to extend the use of five substitutions in matches to the 2020–21 season, which was implemented at the end of the previous season to lessen the impact of fixture congestion caused by the COVID-19 pandemic. The use of five substitutes, based on the decision of competition organisers, had been extended by IFAB until 2021.

== Teams ==
Locations of teams in the 2020–21 Frauen-Bundesliga

=== Team changes ===
| Promoted from 2019–20 2. Bundesliga | Relegated from 2019–20 Bundesliga |
|---|---|
| Werder Bremen; SV Meppen | 1. FC Köln; USV Jena |

=== Stadiums ===
| Team | Home city | Home ground | Capacity |
|---|---|---|---|
| Werder Bremen | Bremen | Weserstadion Platz 12 | 1,000 |
| MSV Duisburg | Duisburg | PCC-Stadion | 3,000 |
| SGS Essen | Essen | Stadion Essen | 20,000 |
| Eintracht Frankfurt | Frankfurt | Stadion am Brentanobad | 5,500 |
| SC Freiburg | Freiburg | Möslestadion | 18,000 |
| 1899 Hoffenheim | Hoffenheim | Dietmar-Hopp-Stadion | 6,350 |
| Bayer Leverkusen | Leverkusen | Jugendleistungszentrum Kurtekotten | 1,140 |
| SV Meppen | Meppen | Hänsch-Arena | 16,500 |
| Bayern Munich | Munich | FC Bayern Campus | 2,500 |
| Turbine Potsdam | Potsdam | Karl-Liebknecht-Stadion | 10,786 |
| SC Sand | Willstätt | Kühnmatt Stadion | 2,000 |
| VfL Wolfsburg | Wolfsburg | AOK Stadium | 5,200 |

== League table ==
| Pos | Team | Pld | W | D | L | GF | GA | GD | Pts | Qualification or relegation |
|---|---|---|---|---|---|---|---|---|---|---|
| 1 | Bayern Munich (C) | 22 | 20 | 1 | 1 | 82 | 9 | +73 | 61 | Qualification for Champions League group stage |
| 2 | VfL Wolfsburg | 22 | 19 | 2 | 1 | 71 | 17 | +54 | 59 | Qualification for Champions League second round |
| 3 | 1899 Hoffenheim | 22 | 14 | 2 | 6 | 54 | 23 | +31 | 44 | Qualification for Champions League first round |
| 4 | Turbine Potsdam | 22 | 12 | 3 | 7 | 41 | 36 | +5 | 39 | |
| 5 | Bayer Leverkusen | 22 | 10 | 3 | 9 | 32 | 39 | −7 | 33 | |
| 6 | Eintracht Frankfurt | 22 | 9 | 3 | 10 | 43 | 29 | +14 | 30 | |
| 7 | SC Freiburg | 22 | 9 | 3 | 10 | 30 | 35 | −5 | 30 | |
| 8 | SGS Essen | 22 | 7 | 4 | 11 | 30 | 37 | −7 | 25 | |
| 9 | Werder Bremen | 22 | 6 | 1 | 15 | 23 | 67 | −44 | 19 | |
| 10 | SC Sand | 22 | 5 | 3 | 14 | 21 | 53 | −32 | 18 | |
| 11 | SV Meppen (R) | 22 | 3 | 5 | 14 | 16 | 52 | −36 | 14 | Relegation to 2. Bundesliga |
| 12 | MSV Duisburg (R) | 22 | 1 | 4 | 17 | 15 | 61 | −46 | 7 | Relegation to 2. Bundesliga |

Source: DFB
Rules for classification: 1) Points; 2) Goal difference; 3) Goals scored; 4) Head-to-head points; 5) Head-to-head goal difference; 6) Head-to-head goals scored; 7) Head-to-head away goals scored; 8) Away goals scored; 9) Play-off.
(C) Champions; (R) Relegated

== Results ==
| Home \ Away | BRE | DUI | ESS | FRA | FRE | HOF | LEV | MEP | MUN | POT | SAN | WOL |
|---|---|---|---|---|---|---|---|---|---|---|---|---|
| Werder Bremen | — | 5–3 | 1–3 | 0–5 | 2–1 | 0–2 | 2–1 | 2–1 | 0–4 | 0–2 | 1–0 | 1–5 |
| MSV Duisburg | 1–2 | — | 1–6 | 0–3 | 1–2 | 1–3 | 0–2 | 0–0 | 0–6 | 2–3 | 0–1 | 0–4 |
| SGS Essen | 2–1 | 2–3 | — | 1–3 | 0–0 | 0–3 | 0–0 | 3–1 | 0–2 | 1–2 | 0–0 | 0–2 |
| Eintracht Frankfurt | 5–1 | 3–0 | 3–1 | — | 0–1 | 0–0 | 2–2 | 1–1 | 0–1 | 0–1 | 4–0 | 2–3 |
| SC Freiburg | 2–1 | 0–0 | 3–1 | 0–3 | — | 1–5 | 1–2 | 5–0 | 1–5 | 1–0 | 2–1 | 1–1 |
| 1899 Hoffenheim | 3–1 | 7–0 | 0–1 | 2–2 | 4–2 | — | 6–0 | 1–0 | 0–4 | 5–0 | 0–0 | 1–4 |
| Bayer Leverkusen | 3–0 | 2–0 | 2–1 | 3–2 | 2–1 | 2–5 | — | 2–2 | 0–4 | 4–2 | 2–1 | 0–4 |
| SV Meppen | 3–2 | 0–0 | 1–3 | 0–4 | 0–1 | 1–0 | 0–3 | — | 0–3 | 2–2 | 0–2 | 0–4 |
| Bayern Munich | 7–0 | 3–0 | 3–0 | 4–0 | 1–0 | 2–3 | 1–0 | 7–1 | — | 3–0 | 6–0 | 4–1 |
| Turbine Potsdam | 0–0 | 1–0 | 2–2 | 2–1 | 3–0 | 3–1 | 2–0 | 4–1 | 2–3 | — | 5–2 | 0–5 |
| SC Sand | 6–1 | 1–1 | 1–3 | 3–2 | 0–3 | 0–3 | 1–0 | 1–2 | 0–8 | 0–3 | — | 1–3 |
| VfL Wolfsburg | 8–0 | 5–2 | 3–0 | 3–0 | 3–2 | 1–0 | 2–0 | 2–0 | 1–1 | 3–2 | 4–0 | — |

Source: DFB
Legend: Blue = home team win; Yellow = draw; Red = away team win.

== Top scorers ==
| Rank | Player | Club | Goals |
|---|---|---|---|
| 1 | (Austria) Nicole Billa | 1899 Hoffenheim | 23 |
| 2 | (Germany) Laura Freigang | Eintracht Frankfurt | 17 |
| 3 | (Germany) Lea Schüller | Bayern Munich | 16 |
| 4 | (Bosnia and Herzegovina) Milena Nikolić | Bayer Leverkusen | 13 |
| 5 | (Hungary) Zsanett Jakabfi | VfL Wolfsburg | 11 |
| 6 | (Germany) Sydney Lohmann | Bayern Munich | 10 |
| 7 | (France) Viviane Asseyi | Bayern Munich | 8 |
| 7 | (Germany) Klara Bühl | Bayern Munich | 8 |
| 7 | (Germany) Selina Cerci | Turbine Potsdam | 8 |
| 7 | (Poland) Ewa Pajor | VfL Wolfsburg | 8 |
