= SFC Stern 1900 =

German football club

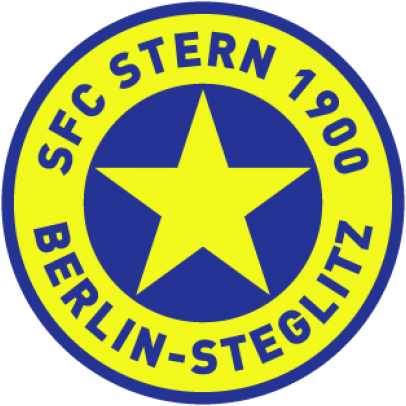
- Full name: Steglitzer Fußball-Club Stern 1900 e.V.
- Founded: 1900; 125 years ago
- Ground: Sportplatz Schildhornstraße
- Capacity: 1,000
- Chairman: Bernd Fiedler
- Trainer: Manuel Cornelius
- League: Berlin-Liga (VI)
- 2015–16: 2nd

SFC Stern 1900 is a German football club based in Berlin-Steglitz, currently playing in the Berlin-Liga (VI).

== Stadium ==
SFC Stern 1900 usually plays its home fixtures at the 1,000 capacity Sportplatz Schildhornstraße.

== Honours ==
The club's honours:

- Berliner Landespokal
  - Runners-up: 2011
