= Danya Barsalona =

Canadian soccer player

Personal information
- Full name: Danya Sarah-Elenor Barsalona
- Date of birth: January 12, 1988 (age 38)
- Place of birth: Toronto, Ontario, Canada
- Height: 1.63 m (5 ft 4 in)
- Position: Striker

Team information
- Current team: Viktoria Berlin

Youth career
- Burlington Xtreme

College career
Years	Team	Apps	(Gls)
2006–2009	UAB Blazers		

Senior career*
Years	Team	Apps	(Gls)
2010–2011	UPC Tavagnacco	3	(0)
2011	Hamilton Rage		
2011–2012	Lagunak	19	(0)
2013	K-W United FC		
2015	Sandviken	1	(0)
2015–2016	Lübars	8	(0)
2016–2017	Union Berlin	17	(0)
2018–	Viktoria Berlin		
- * Club domestic league appearances and goals as of 19 July 2020

Danya Sarah-Elenor Barsalona (born January 12, 1988) is a Canadian soccer player who plays as a midfielder for German club Viktoria Berlin.

She previously played for IL Sandviken in Norway's Toppserien, SD Lagunak in Spain's Primera División, for 1. FC Lübars and 1. FC Union Berlin in the German 2. Bundesliga and UPC Tavagnacco in Italy's Serie A. She attended and played for the University of Alabama at Birmingham from 2006 to 2010 in the United States's NCAA Division I. She was also a member of the Canadian National Team.

Besides her football career she is working as a sports journalist with Deutsche Welle. Her brother, Andrew, is also a soccer player.
