= Anna Wellmann =

German footballer (born 1995)

Personal information
- Date of birth: 19 May 1995 (age 31)
- Place of birth: Xanten, Germany
- Height: 1.76 m (5 ft 9 in)
- Position: Goalkeeper

Team information
- Current team: Eibar (on loan from Bayern Munich)

Senior career*
Years	Team	Apps	(Gls)
2016–2019	Bayern Munich II	28	(0)
2019–2021	Bayer Leverkusen	7	(0)
2021–2023	Turbine Potsdam	25	(0)
2023–2025	Bayern Munich	1	(0)
2024–2025	Bayern Munich II	14	(0)
2025–2026	Sporting CP	10	(0)
2026–	Bayern Munich	0	(0)
2026–	→ Eibar (loan)	11	(0)
- * Club domestic league appearances and goals as of 21 November 2026

Anna Wellmann (born 19 May 1995) is a German footballer who plays as a goalkeeper for Liga F club Eibar, on loan from Bayern Munich. She previously played for Frauen-Bundesliga clubs Bayer Leverkusen, Turbine Potsdam, Bayern Munich and Campeonato Nacional Feminino club Sporting CP.

== Biography ==
Wellmann was born 19 May 1995 in Xanten, Germany.

In 2012, Wellmann debuted with SpVgg Kaufbeuren, then played for TSV Schwaben Augsburg (2015–16), Bayern Munich (2016–19), Bayer Leverkusen (2019-2021), and Turbine Potsdam (2021-2023). In 2023, she returned to Bayern Munich with a contract expiring in 2026.

In June 2025, Wellmann left Bayern Munich and joined Campeonato Nacional Feminino club Sporting CP.

In the summer of 2026, Anna Wellmann returned to FC Bayern Munich, where she signed a three-year contract, and was subsequently loaned to the Liga F club Eibar for the 2026/27 season.

== Honours ==
Bayern Munich

- Frauen-Bundesliga: 2023–24
