= Dietmar-Hopp-Stadion =

Football venue in Hoffenheim, Germany

Coordinates: 49°16′41.8″N 8°50′31.6″E

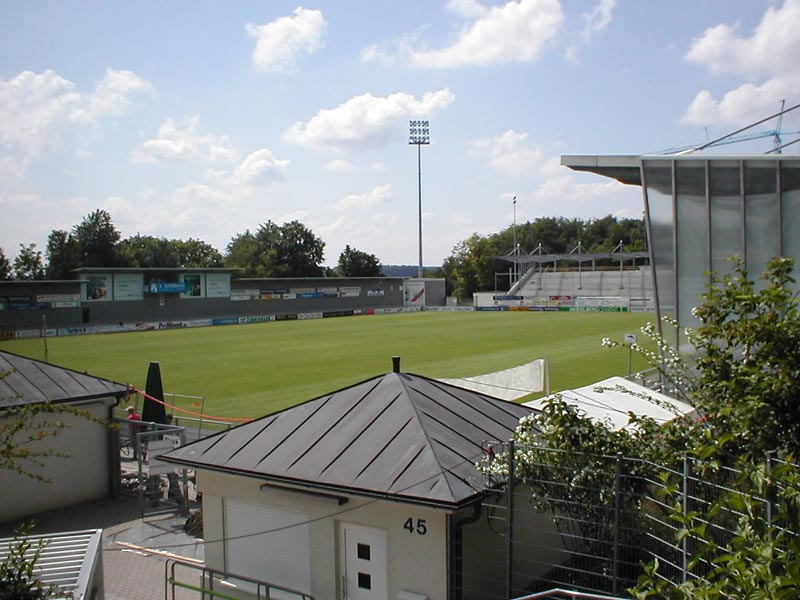
- Interactive map of Dietmar-Hopp-Stadion
- Address: 45 Silbergasse; Sinsheim
- Location: Rhein-Neckar-Kreis
- Capacity: 6,350
- Events: 2000 UEFA European Under-18 Championship; 2001 DFB-Ligapokal; Baden Cup final (2004, 2020)

Construction
- Opened: 1999

Tenants
- TSG 1899 Hoffenheim; TSG 1899 Hoffenheim II

The Dietmar-Hopp-Stadion (German pronunciation: [ˌdiːtmaʁˈhɔpˌʃtaːdi̯ɔn]) is a football ground in the Hoffenheim district of Sinsheim, Baden-Württemberg, Germany. The 6,350-capacity stadium is the home of 1899 Hoffenheim II and the Hoffenheim women's section. It had been home to the Hoffenheim senior men's side until their promotion to the Bundesliga for 2008–09. It is named after SAP SE co-founder and 1899 Hoffenheim chairman, Dietmar Hopp.

As the stadium does not meet the standards for the Bundesliga, it has been replaced by the Rhein-Neckar Arena.
