= TSG 1899 Hoffenheim (women) =

Women's football team of the German sports club

- Full name: Turn- und Sportgemeinschaft; 1899 Hoffenheim e.V.
- Nicknames: Die Kraichgauer (From Kraichgau region), achtzehn99 (1899)
- Founded: 2007; 19 years ago
- Ground: Dietmar-Hopp-Stadion
- Capacity: 6,350
- President: 1^{st} André Kreuzwieser; 2^{nd} Florian Beil; 3^{rd} Frank Engelhardt
- Head coach: Eva-Maria Virsinger
- League: Bundesliga
- 2025–26: Bundesliga, 4th of 14
- Website: https://www.tsg-hoffenheim.de/teams/frauen/frauen-ueberblick
Home colours	Away colours	Third colours

TSG 1899 Hoffenheim Frauen is the German women's football club based in Hoffenheim, a village of Sinsheim municipality, Baden-Württemberg, inside the Rhine-Neckar. Since 2013, the club plays in the Bundesliga, the highest level of football in Germany.

== History ==
The team started playing in 2007 and rushed through the lower leagues. It plays at Dietmar-Hopp-Stadion.

In January 2026, Eva-Maria Virsinger was appointed head coach.

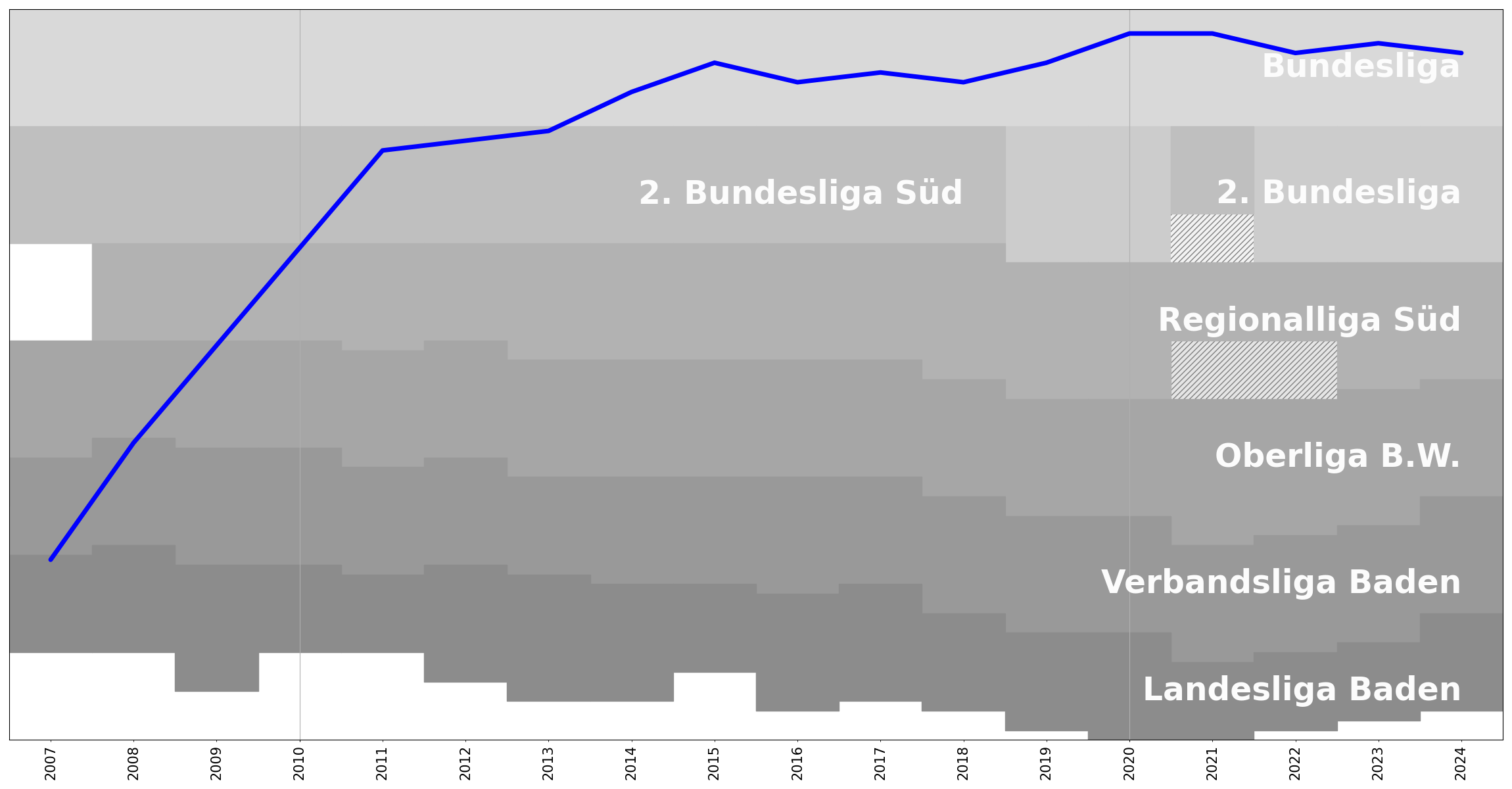
Chart of league positions at end of season

== Players ==
=== Current squad ===
As of 4 July 2026

Note: Flags indicate national team as defined under FIFA eligibility rules; some limited exceptions apply. Players may hold more than one non-FIFA nationality.

No.	Pos.	Nation	Player
1	GK	GER	Laura Dick
4	DF	GER	Lisann Kaut
6	MF	GER	Vanessa Diehm (captain)
7	MF	SUI	Naomi Luyet
9	FW	GER	Marie Steiner
10	MF	BEL	Valesca Ampoorter
11	FW	AUT	Linda Natter
13	DF	NED	Wiëlle Douma
14	DF	NED	Lisa Doorn
15	FW	NOR	Martine Fenger
16	MF	GER	Milena Röder
17	MF	GER	Franziska Harsch
18	DF	NED	Ilse Kemper
19	FW	SUI	Svenja Fölmli

No.	Pos.	Nation	Player
20	DF	GER	Laura Gloning
21	FW	ESP	Laia Martret
22	DF	GER	Sara Ritter
23	MF	GER	Chiara Hahn
24	MF	BEL	Féli Delacauw
25	DF	NED	Jonna van de Velde
26	MF	GER	Janna Grimm
29	FW	AUT	Denise Lueger
27	GK	BEL	Lisa Lichtfus
30	DF	GER	Nadine Bitzer
31	GK	GER	Romy Bräutigam
34	DF	GER	Svenja Voehringer
36	MF	GER	Vivien Thomann

== Seasons ==
Season	Division	Tier	Position
2007–08	Verbandsliga Baden	V	1st↑
2008–09	Oberliga Baden-Württemberg	IV	1st↑
2009–10	Regionalliga Süd	III	1st↑
2010–11	2. Bundesliga	II	3rd
2011–12	2. Bundesliga	II	2nd
2012–13	2. Bundesliga	II	1st↑
2013–14	Bundesliga	I	9th
2014–15	Bundesliga	I	6th
2015–16	Bundesliga	I	8th
2016–17	Bundesliga	I	7th
2017–18	Bundesliga	I	8th
2018–19	Bundesliga	I	6th
2019–20	Bundesliga	I	3rd
2020–21	Bundesliga	I	3rd
2021–22	Bundesliga	I	5th
2022–23	Bundesliga	I	5th
2023–24	Bundesliga	I	5th
2024–25	Bundesliga	I	6th
2025–26	Bundesliga	I	4th
2026–27	Bundesliga	I	

Key

↑ Promoted	↓ Relegated

== Record in UEFA Women's Champions League ==
All results (away, home and aggregate) list TSG 1899 Hoffenheims goal tally first.

Competition	Round	Club	Away	Home	Aggregate
2021–22	Qualifying round 1 SF	(Iceland) Valur	1–0		
2021–22	Qualifying round 1 F	(Italy) Milan	2–0		
2021–22	Qualifying round 2	(Czech Republic) Sparta Prague	3–0 ^{f}	3–3	6–3
2021–22	Group stage	(Spain) Barcelona	0–4 ^{f}	0–5	3rd
2021–22	Group stage	(England) Arsenal	0–4 ^{f}	4–1	3rd
2021–22	Group stage	(Denmark) Køge	2–1	5–0 ^{f}	3rd

^{f} First leg.
