= List of foreign Frauen-Bundesliga players =

This is a list of foreign players in the Frauen-Bundesliga, which commenced play in 1990. The following players must meet both of the following two criteria:

1. Have played at least one Bundesliga game. Players who were signed by Frauen-Bundesliga clubs, but only played in lower league, cup and/or European games, or did not play in any competitive games at all, are not included. Players of 2. Frauen-Bundesliga clubs are also not included.
2. Are considered foreign, i.e., outside Germany determined by the following:

A player is considered foreign if she is not eligible to play for the national team of Germany.

More specifically,

- If a player has been capped at international level, the national team is used; if she has been capped by more than one country, the highest level (or the most recent) team is used. These include German players with dual citizenship.
- If a player has not been capped at international level, her country of birth is used, except those who were born abroad from German parents or moved to Germany at a young age, and those who clearly indicated to have switched her nationality to another nation.

Clubs listed are those for which the player has played at least one Frauen-Bundesliga game – and seasons are those in which the player has played at least one Frauen-Bundesliga game. Note that seasons, not calendar years, are used. For example, "1992–95" indicates that the player has played in every season from 1992–93 to 1994–95, but not necessarily every calendar year from 1992 to 1995. Therefore, a player should always have a listing under at least two years — for instance, a player making his debut in 2014, during the 2013–14 season, will have '2013–14' after his name. This follows general practice in expressing sporting seasons.

Also please consider, that season specifications shall only be divided into more than one element, if a player has at least one season played no game in the Bundesliga. For example, a player plays in 2012–13 at club "A" and in 2013–14 at club "B", the correct season specification is "2012–14". This approach is used to keep the list more clear and readable.

In bold: players who are currently under contract by a Frauen-Bundesliga club.

As of 11 December 2024

== Naturalized players ==
- (Albania) (Kosovo) Fatmire Alushi (née Bajramaj) – FCR 2001 Duisburg, Turbine Potsdam, 1. FFC Frankfurt – 2004–2014
- (United States) Gia Corley – Bayern Munich, TSG Hoffenheim – 2021–2025
- (Indonesia) Amira Dahl – Werder Bremen – 2023–2025
- (Iran) (Turkey) Sara Doorsoun – SC 07 Bad Neuenahr, Turbine Potsdam, SGS Essen, VfL Wolfsburg, Eintracht Frankfurt – 2009–
- (Iraq) Venus El-Kassem – Bayer Leverkusen, Werder Bremen – 2013–2016
- (Italy) Noemi Gentile – SC Sand, Turbine Potsdam, Carl Zeiss Jena – 2020–
- (Belgium) Kathrin Hendrich – Bayer Leverkusen, 1. FFC Frankfurt, Bayern Munich, VfL Wolfsburg – 2010–2025
- (Hungary) Dzsenifer Marozsán – 1. FC Saarbrücken, 1. FFC Frankfurt – 2007–2016
- (Cameroon) Célia Šašić (née Okoyino da Mbabi) - SC 07 Bad Neuenahr, 1. FFC Frankfurt – 2004–2015
- (Croatia) Martina Tufekovic – Wolfsburg, TSG Hoffenheim – 2013–
- (Montenegro) Merza Julevic - Carl Zeiss Jena, Herforder, SC Freiburg, Sindelfingen - 2010-
- (Tanzania) Lisa Baum - RB Leizpig - 2025-
- (Namibia) Sandra Starke - Potsdam, Freiburg, Leipzig - 2012-

== Africa (CAF) ==
=== Algeria ===
- Nacera Bechikhi – 1. FC Saarbrücken – 1997–2000, 2001–2002
- Inès Belloumou – Bayern Munich – 2023–2024
- Lydia Miraoui – SC Freiburg – 2011–2012

=== Cameroon ===
- Marlyse Ngo Ndoumbouk – FF USV Jena – 2009–2011
- Jeannette Yango – Turbine Potsdam – 2012–2013

=== DR Congo ===
- Safi Nyembo – 1. FFC Frankfurt, FSV Frankfurt, Lokomotive Leipzig, FF USV Jena – 2004–2006, 2011–2013

=== Equatorial Guinea ===
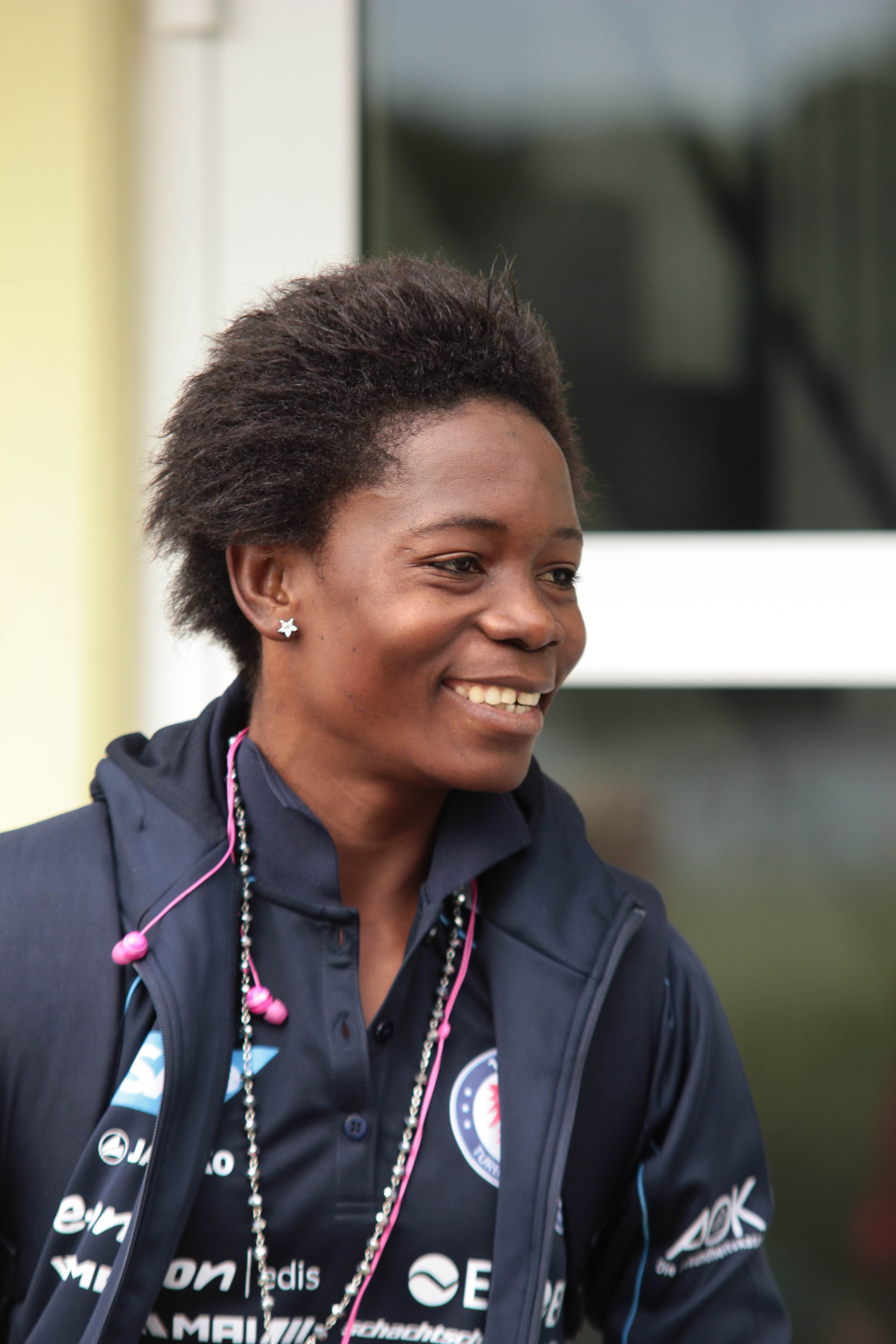
(Equatorial Guinea) Genoveva Añonma won the league title with Turbine Potsdam in season 2011–12 and became the first foreign player in Bundesliga history to win the top scorer award with 22 goals. She scored a total of 100 goals in 141 matches for three clubs.

- Genoveva Añonman – FF USV Jena, Turbine Potsdam, MSV Duisburg – 2008–2015, 2017–18

=== Ghana ===
- Louisa Aniwaa – Turbine Potsdam – 2022–2023
- Adjoa Bayor – FF USV Jena – 2009–2011
- Josephine Bonsu – Carl Zeiss Jena – 2024–2026
- Florence Okoe – Tennis Borussia Berlin – 2009–2010
- Persis Oteng – RB Leipzig – 2025-2026
- Rumanatu Tahiru – Tennis Borussia Berlin – 2009–2010

=== Ivory Coast ===
- **Bernadette Amani** – Bayern Munich – 2025–

=== Mali ===
- Teninsoun Sissoko – Turbine Potsdam – 2021–2023

=== Morocco ===
- Faiza Bououd-Fath – FSV Frankfurt – 2005–2006
- **Sabah Seghir** – SC Freiburg – 2026–

=== Nigeria ===
- Florence Ajayi – TuS Niederkirchen – 1999–2000
- Nkechi Egbe – TuS Niederkirchen – 1999–2000
- Patricia George – SC Sand – 2020–2022
- Eberechi Opara – TuS Niederkirchen – 1999–2000
- Desire Oparanozie – VfL Wolfsburg – 2013–2014
- Gloria Usieta – TuS Niederkirchen – 1999–2000
- Cynthia Uwak – 1. FC Saarbrücken – 2009–2011
- Onyinyechi Zogg – Turbine Potsdam – 2022–2023

=== Tunisia ===
- Hanna Hamdi – MSV Duisburg – 2020–2021
- Chaima Khammar – 1. FC Köln – 2017–2018

== Asia (AFC) ==
=== Afghanistan ===
- Hailai Arghandiwal – MSV Duisburg – 2019–2020

=== Australia ===
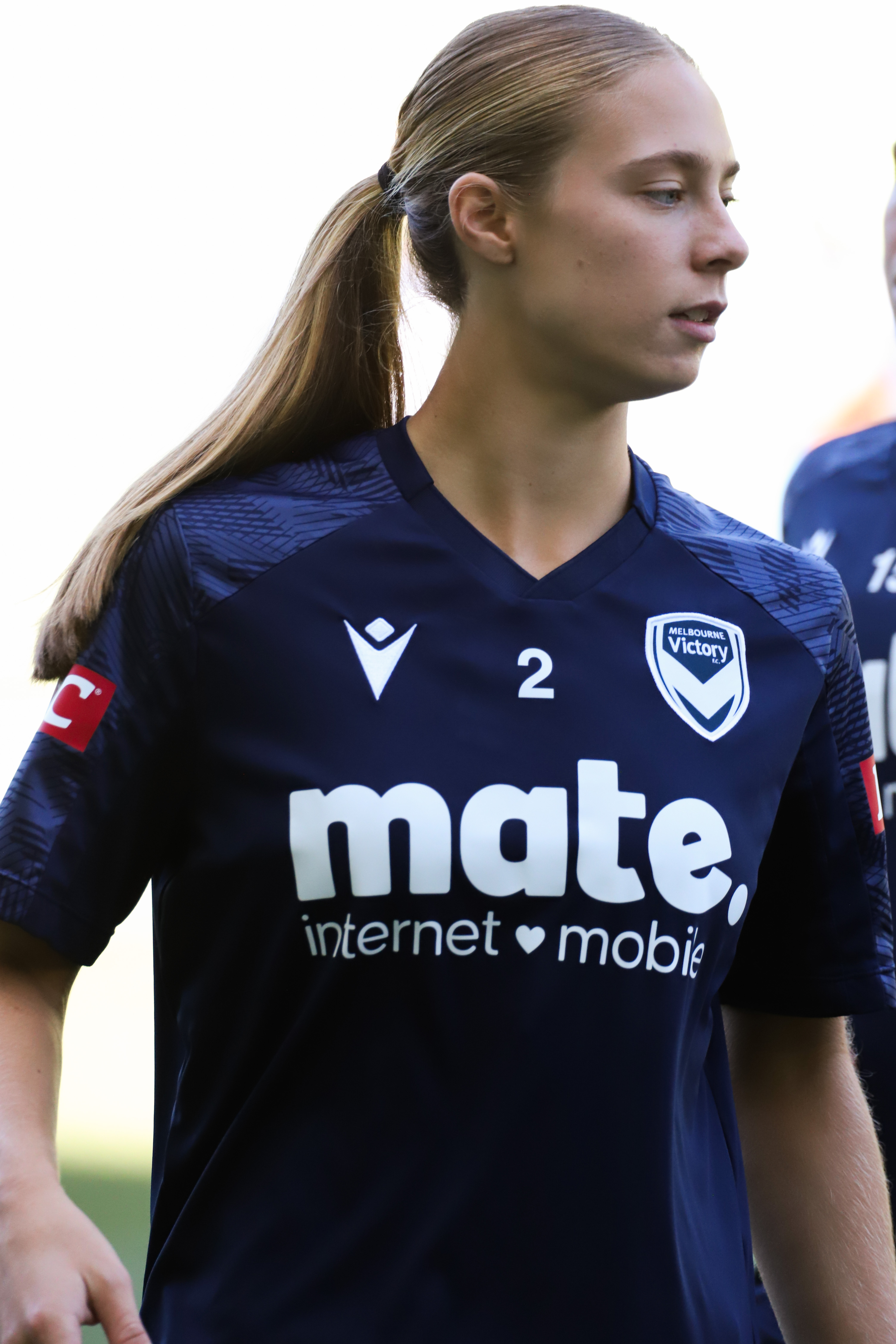
Jamilla Rankin

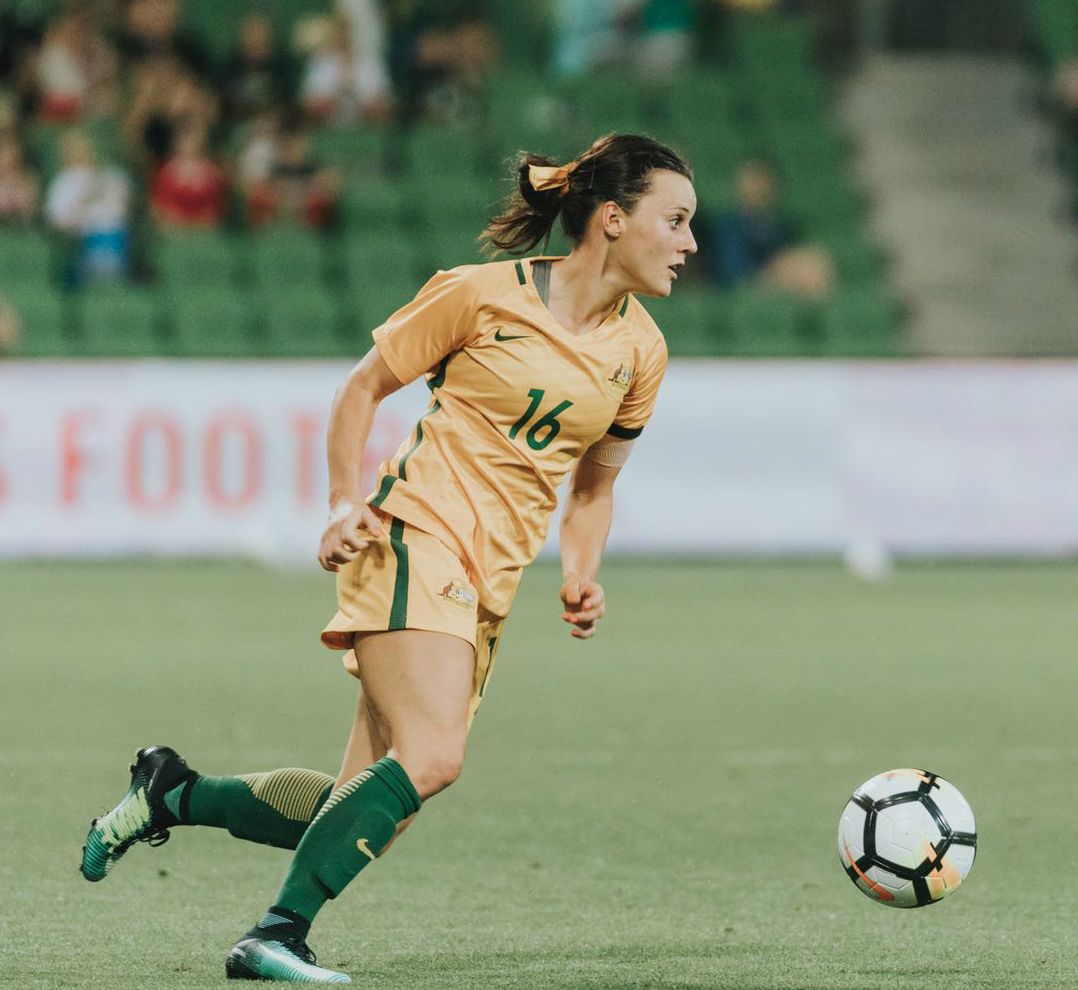
Hayley Raso

- Louisa Bisby – FFC Brauweiler Pulheim – 2005–2006
- Emily Gielnik – Bayern Munich – 2019–2020
- Beattie Goad – SV Meppen – 2020–2021
- Elise Kellond-Knight – Turbine Potsdam – 2015–2017
- Anna Margraf – SV Meppen, Carl Zeiss Jena – 2022–2023, 2024–2026
- **Jamilla Rankin** – TSG Hoffenheim, Eintracht Frankfurt – 2024–
- **Hayley Raso** – Eintracht Frankfurt – 2025–
- Sally Shipard – Bayer Leverkusen – 2011–2012
- Emily Van Egmond – 1. FFC Frankfurt, VfL Wolfsburg – 2015–2017
- **Leia Varley** – 1. FC Nürnberg – 2025–
- Tameka Yallop (née Butt) – 1. FFC Frankfurt – 2013–2014

=== China ===
- Wang Fei – Turbine Potsdam – 2014–2015
- Shen Menglu – Bayer Leverkusen – 2024–2026

=== Japan ===
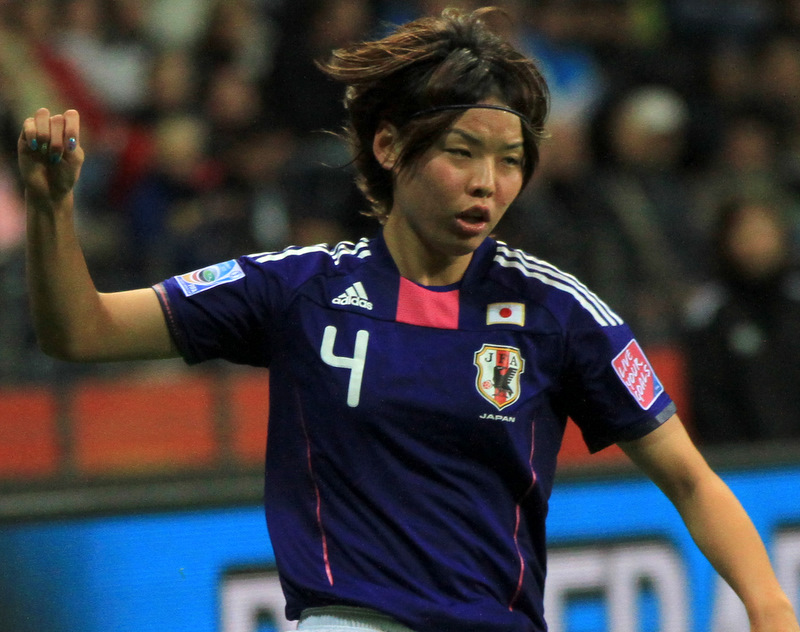
(Japan) Saki Kumagai

- Kozue Ando – MSV Duisburg, 1. FFC Frankfurt, SGS Essen – 2009–2017
- Remina Chiba – Eintracht Frankfurt – 2023–2026
- **Suguri Hashitani** – Mainz 05 – 2026–
- **Yuka Hirano** – 1. FC Köln, VfB Stuttgart – 2019–2020, 2021–2022, 2026–
- Mai Hirata – SV Meppen – 2022–2023
- **Yurina Imai** – Mainz 05 – 2026–
- Sara Ito – Turbine Potsdam – 2024–2025
- Mana Iwabuchi – TSG Hoffenheim, Bayern Munich – 2013–2017
- Mai Kadowaki – RB Leipzig – 2024–2026
- Serina Kashimoto – MSV Duisburg – 2017–2018
- Hiromi Katagari – FCR Duisburg 55, FFC Flaesheim-Hillen, Bayern Munich – 1998–2002
- Miho Kinoshita – FCR Duisburg 55, 1. FC Saarbrücken – 2000–2001, 2003–2004
- Saki Kumagai – 1. FFC Frankfurt, Bayern Munich – 2011–2013, 2021–2023
- **Akari Kurishima** – Mainz 05 – 2026–
- Mai Kyokawa – Turbine Potsdam – 2022–2023
- **Mamiko Matsumoto** – Mainz 05 – 2026–
- Asano Nagasato – Turbine Potsdam – 2013–2015
- Yūki Nagasato – Turbine Potsdam, VfL Wolfsburg, 1. FFC Frankfurt – 2010–2013, 2015–2017
- Hikaru Naomoto – SC Freiburg – 2018–2020
- **Haruka Osawa** – VfB Stuttgart – 2026–
- Yuki Otsuka – FFC Flaesheim-Hillen – 1999–2000
- Satomi Shibata – MSV Duisburg – 2013–2014
- **Mei Shimada** – Werder Bremen – 2026–
- Aki Tago – SC 07 Bad Neuenahr – 2012–2013
- Fuko Takahashi – MSV Duisburg – 2018–2019
- **Rio Takizawa** – Mainz 05 – 2026–
- Asuna Tanaka – 1. FFC Frankfurt – 2013–2015
- **Momoko Tanikawa** – Bayern Munich – 2024–
- Rie Yamaki – 1. FFC Frankfurt – 1999–2000
- Kumi Yokoyama – 1. FFC Frankfurt – 2017–2018

=== Jordan ===
- Sarah Abu-Sabbah – Bayer Leverkusen, Borussia Mönchengladbach, SV Meppen – 2015–2016, 2018–2019, 2022–2023

=== Philippines ===
- **Katana Norman** - VfB Stuttgart - 2026-

=== South Korea ===
- Cha Yun-hee – SC 07 Bad Neuenahr – 2009–2010
- Lee Jang-mi – 1. FFC Frankfurt – 2009–2010

=== Syria ===
- Jalila Dalaf – FF USV Jena – 2019–2020

== Europe (UEFA) ==
=== Albania ===
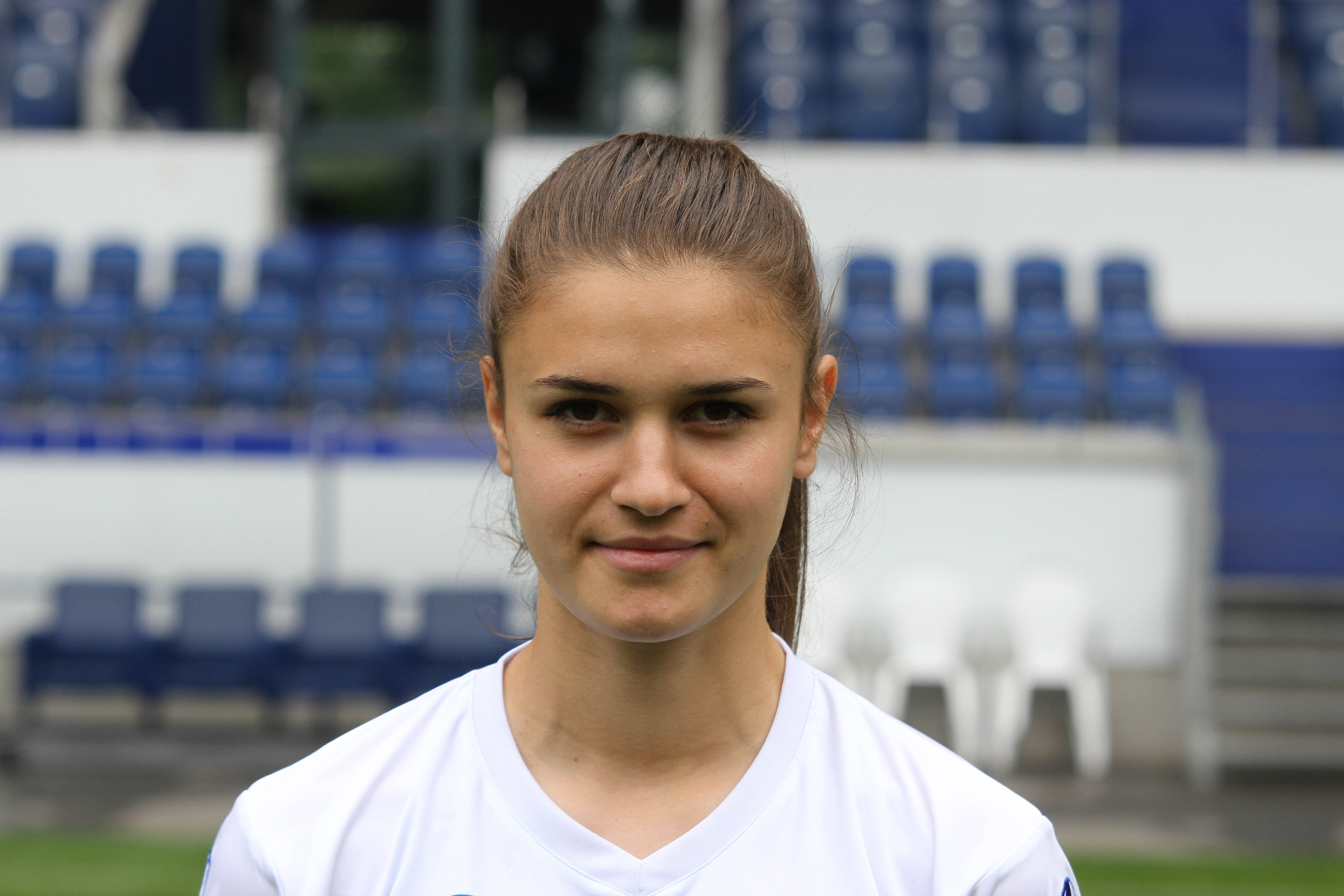
(Albania) Geldona Morina

- Kristina Maksuti – MSV Duisburg, SV Meppen – 2019–2020, 2022–2023
- Geldona Morina – MSV Duisburg, SGS Essen – 2010–2015, 2017–2021
- Aferdita Podvorica – WSV Wolfsburg-Wendschott, Turbine Potsdam – 2000–2001, 2004–2009
- Furtuna Velaj – SC Sand – 2014–2015, 2016–2017
- Dafina Redzepi - VfB Stuttgart - 2026

=== Austria ===
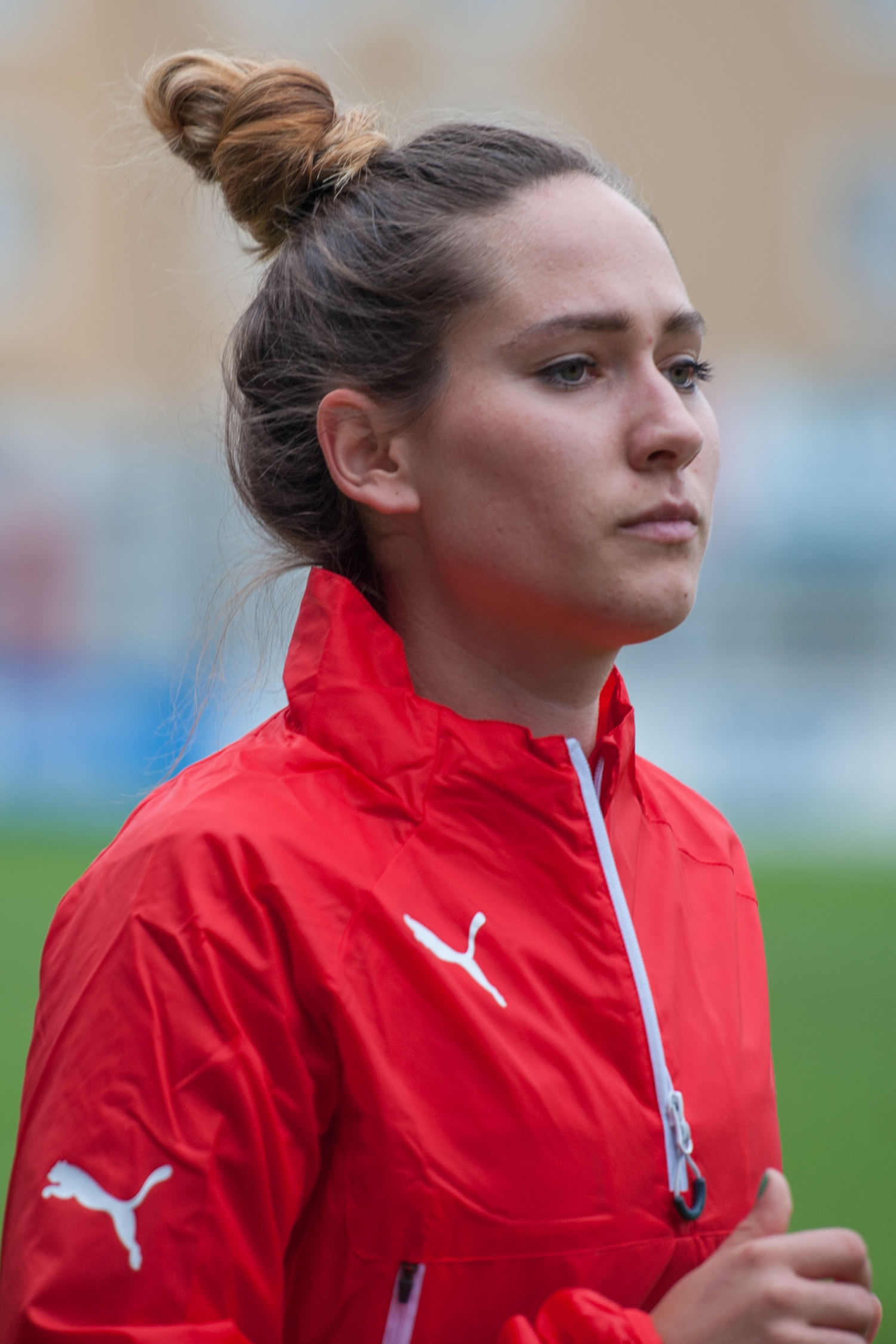
(Austria) Jasmin Eder

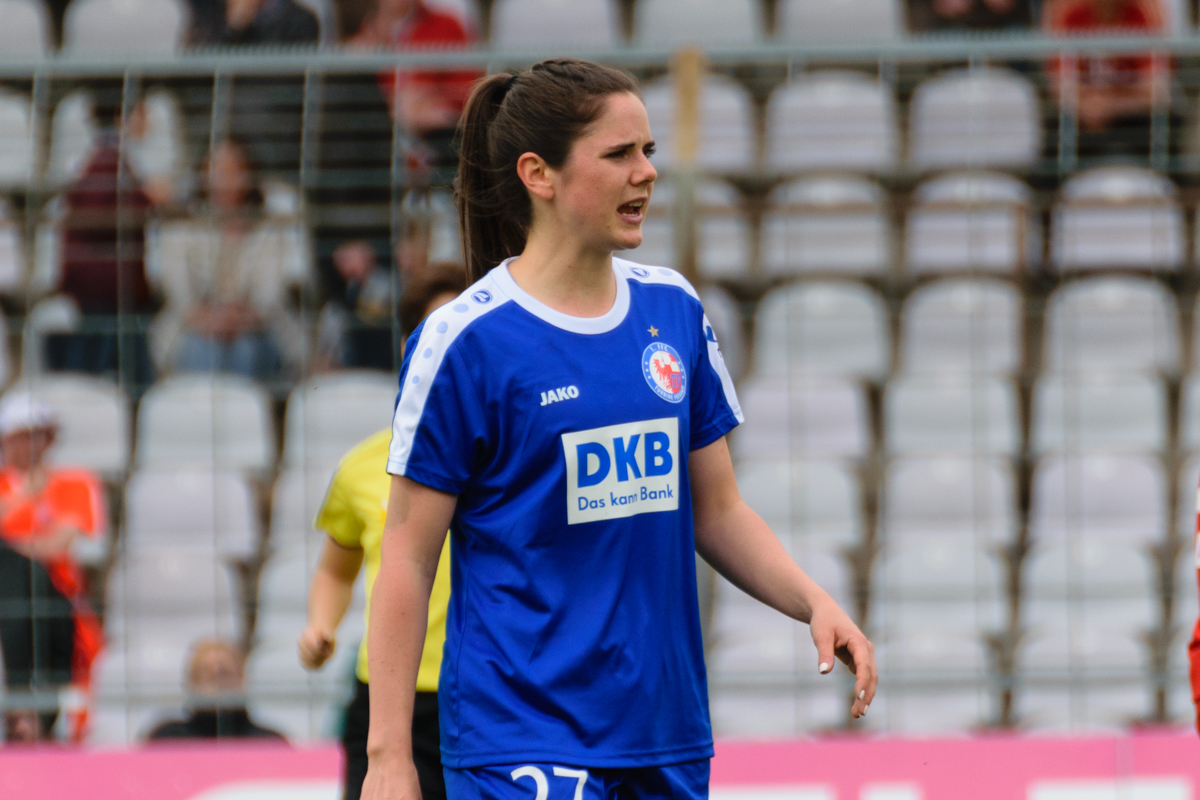
(Austria) Sarah Zadrazil

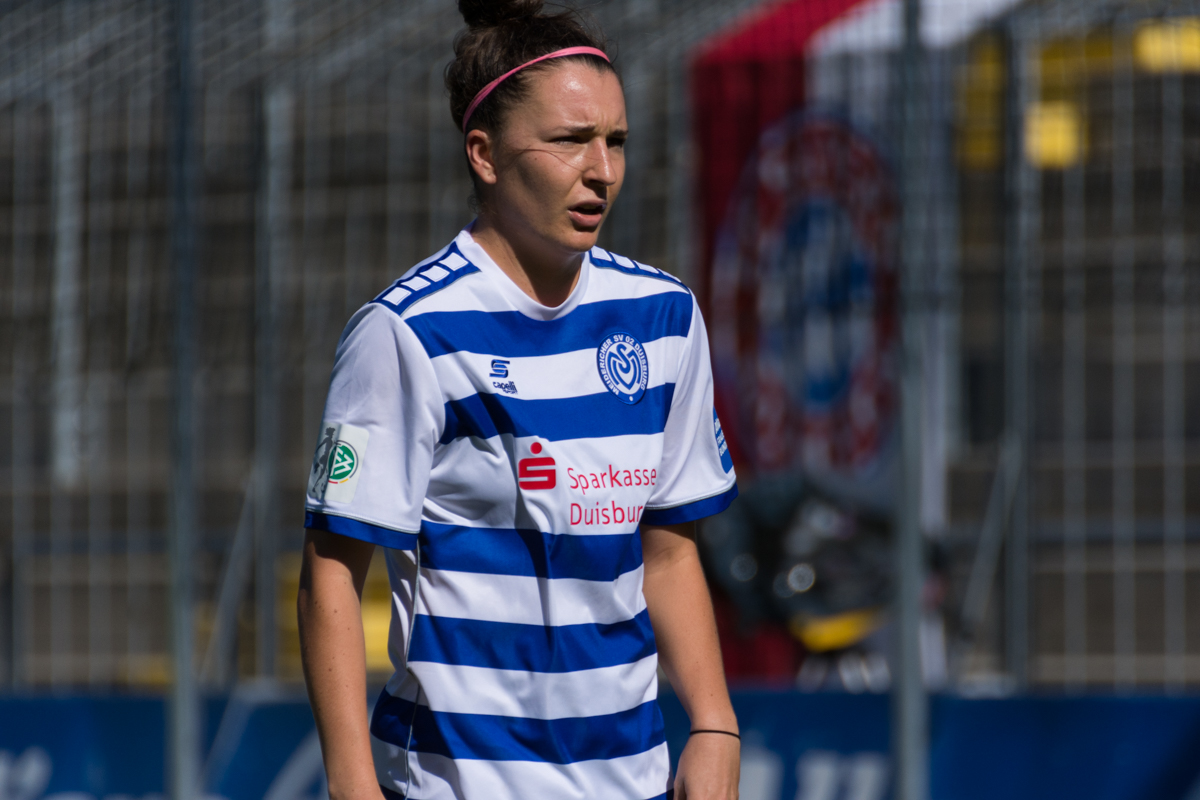
(Austria) Barbara Dunst

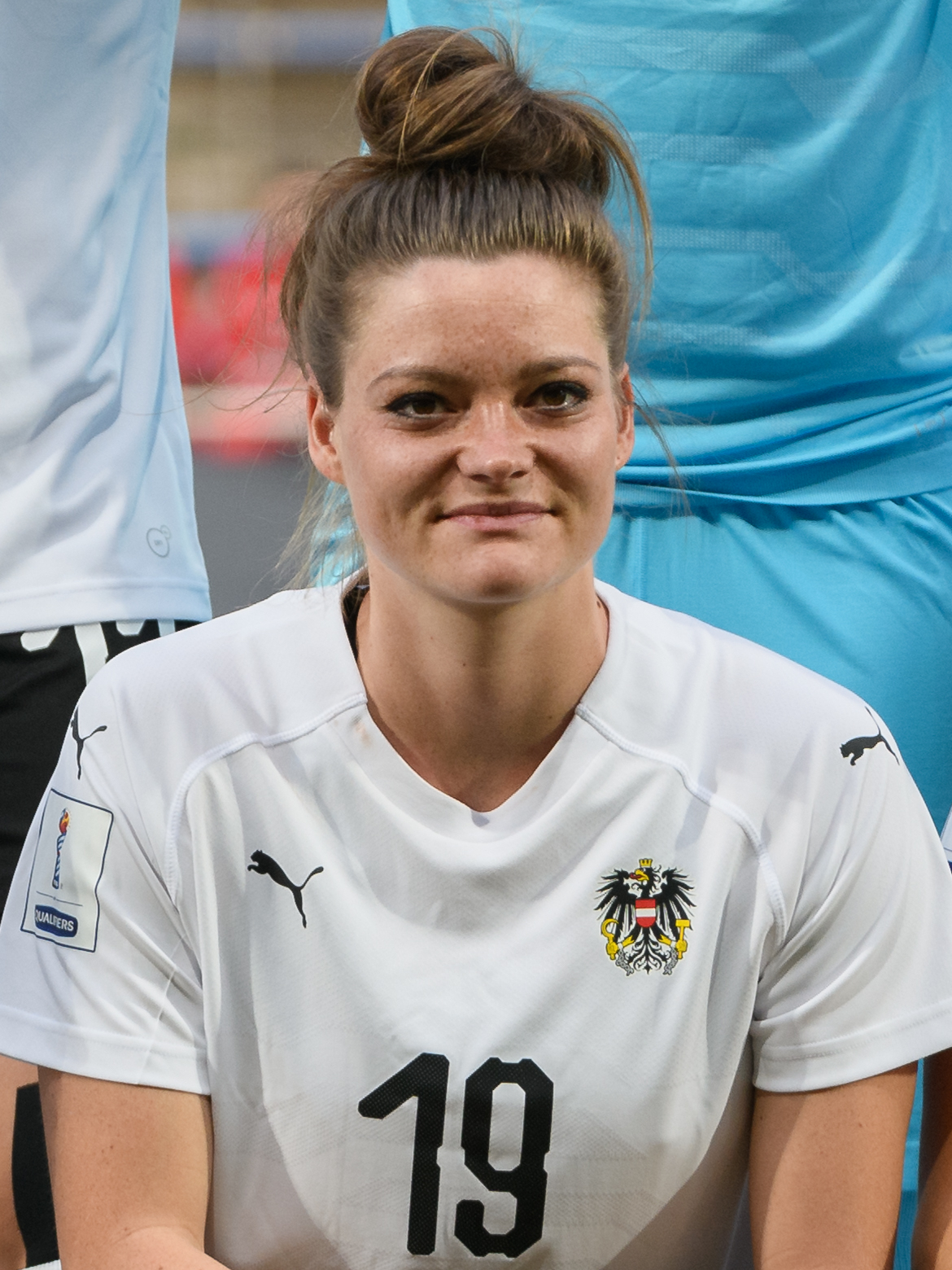
(Austria) Verena Hanshaw

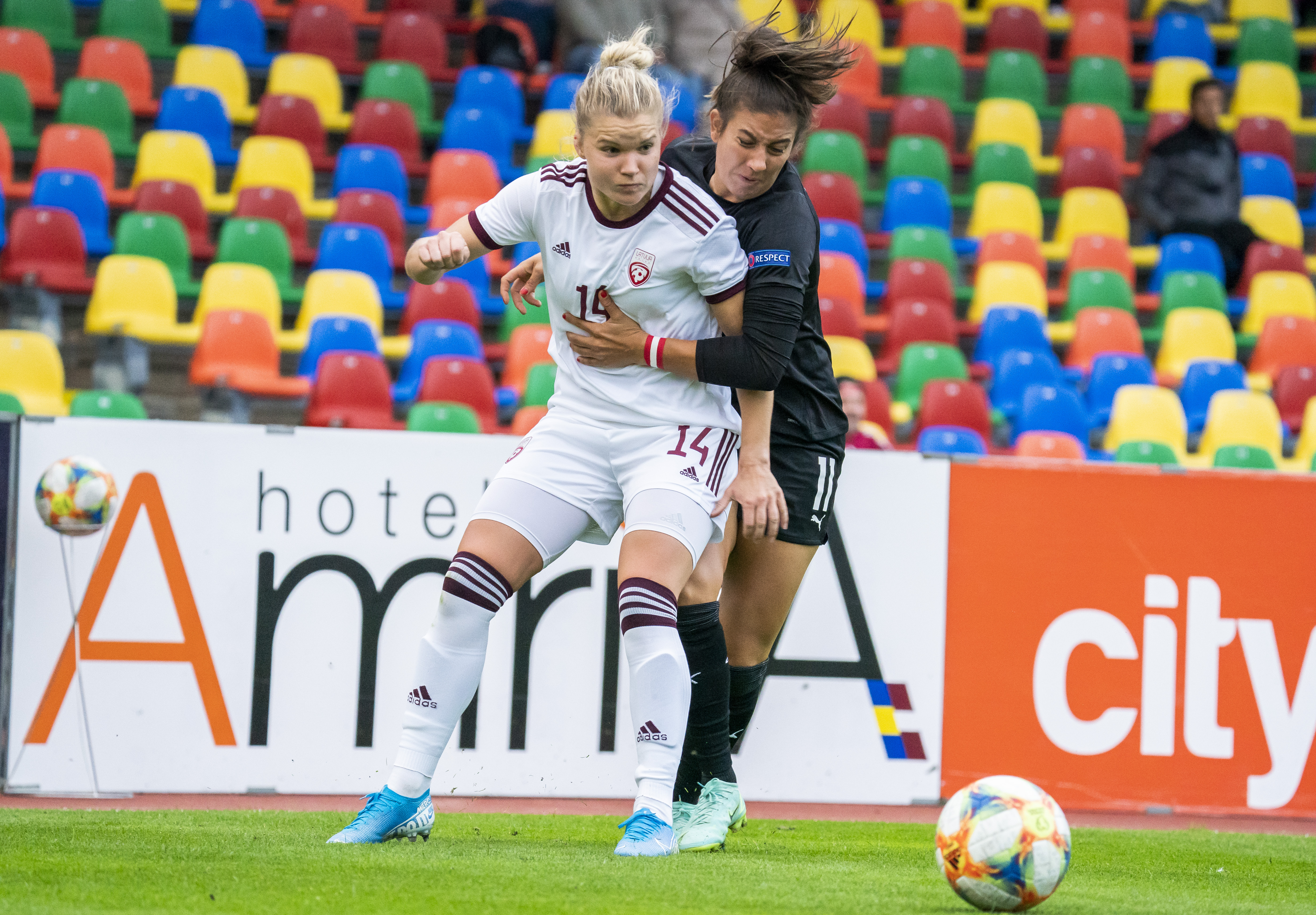
(Austria) Marina Georgieva

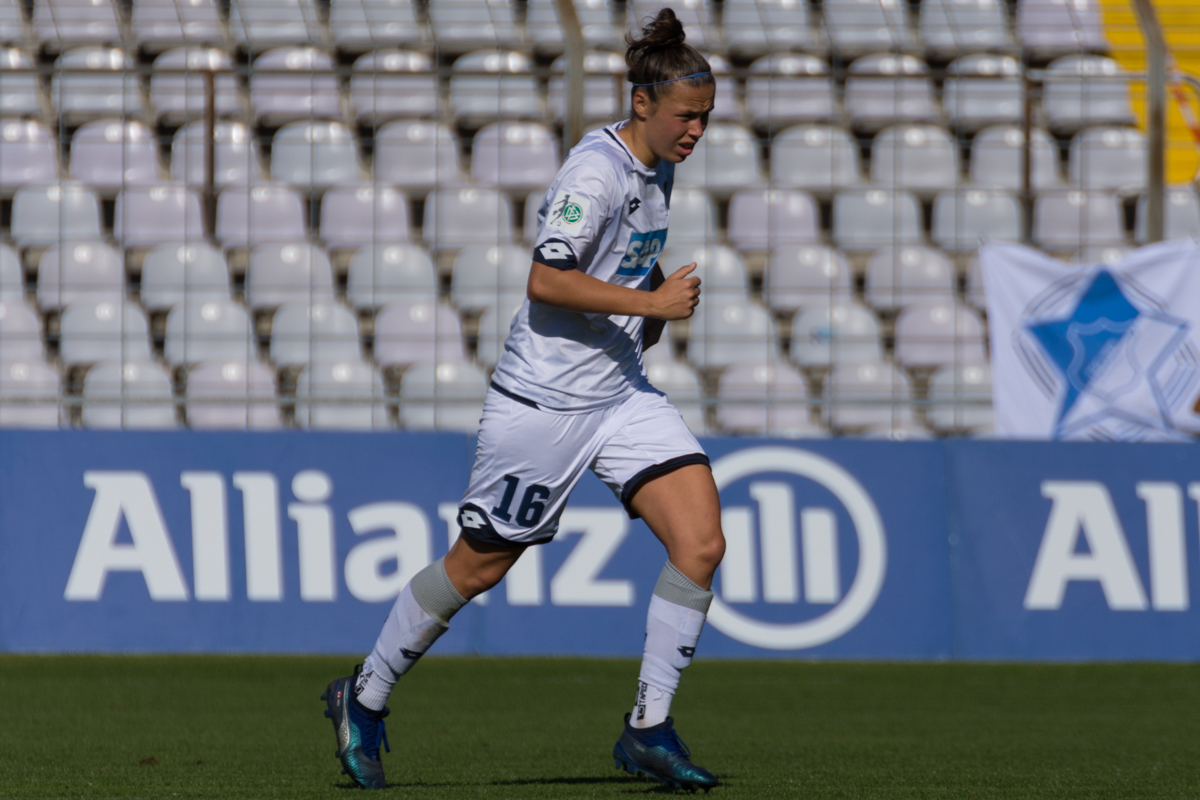
(Austria) Nicole Billa

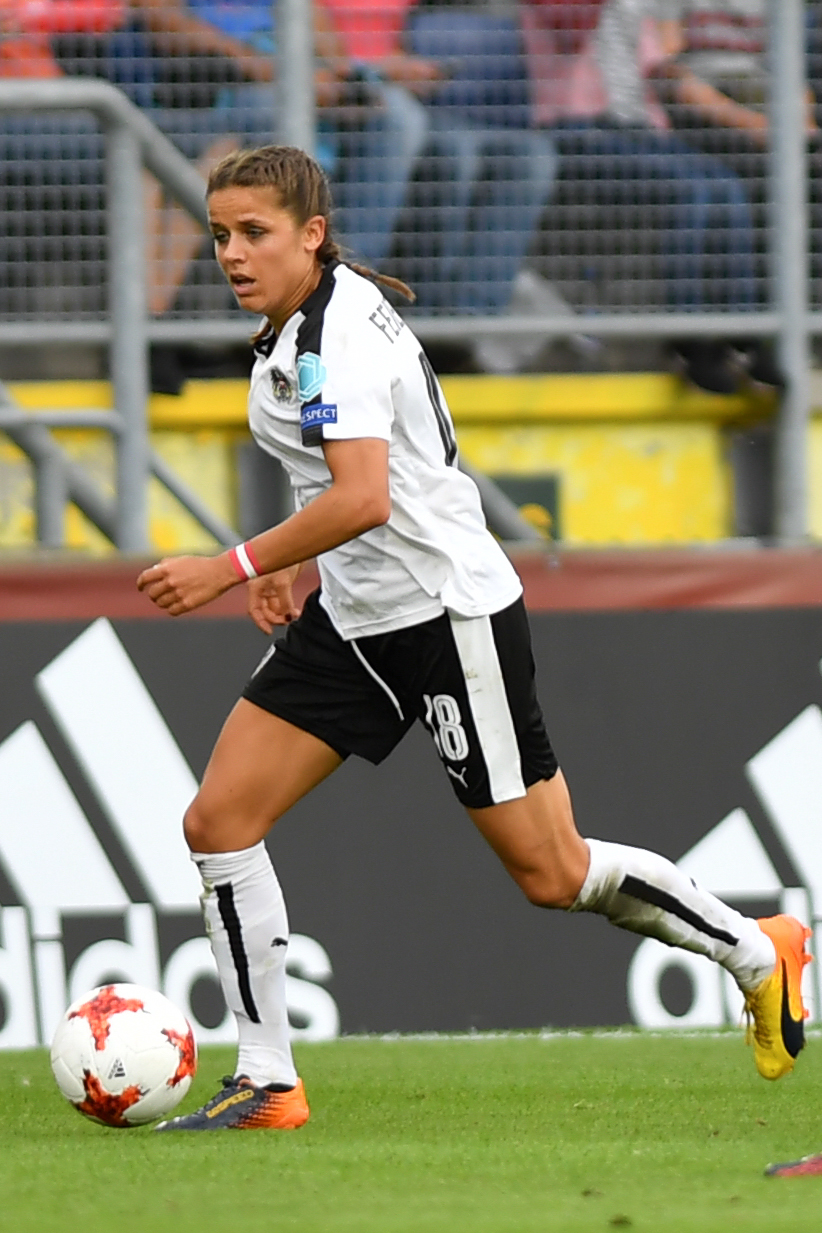
(Austria) Laura Feiersinger won two league titles with Bayern Munich and has 235 Bundesliga appearances with 5 clubs up to now.

- Alina Kerschbaumer - FC Koln - 2026-
- Ella Rauscha - Bayern Munich - 2026-
- Denise Lueger - TSG Hoffenheim - 2026-
- Mia Richter - Nurnberg - 2026
- **Christina Schönwetter** - VfL Wolfsburg - 2025-
- Nina Aigner – Bayern Munich – 2001–2011
- **Nicole Billa** – TSG Hoffenheim, 1. FC Köln, VfB Stuttgart – 2015–2025, 2026–
- Livia Brunmair – 1. FC Nürnberg – 2023–2024
- **Melanie Brunnthaler** – Hamburger SV – 2025–
- **Carina Brunold** – SC Freiburg – 2026–
- Nina Burger – SC Sand – 2015–2019
- **Eileen Campbell** – SC Freiburg, Union Berlin – 2023–
- **Michela Croatto** – RB Leipzig, Hamburger SV – 2023–
- **Chiara D'Angelo** – TSG Hoffenheim, Werder Bremen – 2023–2024, 2025–
- **Celina Degen** – TSG Hoffenheim, 1. FC Köln – 2020–
- **Barbara Dunst** – Bayer Leverkusen, MSV Duisburg, Eintracht Frankfurt, Bayern Munich – 2016–
- Jasmin Eder – VfL Sindelfingen – 2012–2013
- **Mariella El Sherif** – Carl Zeiss Jena, Werder Bremen – 2024–
- **Laura Feiersinger** – Herforder SV, Bayern Munich, SC Sand, Eintracht Frankfurt, 1. FC Köln – 2010–2023, 2024–
- Lara Felix – 1. FC Nürnberg – 2023–2024
- Melanie Fischer – Bayern Munich – 2004–2005
- **Marina Georgieva** – SC Sand, Union Berlin, Mainz 05 – 2018–2022, 2026–
- Marion Gröbner – Herforder SV, FSV Gütersloh – 2010–2011, 2012–2013
- Sarah Gutmann – Werder Bremen – 2025–
- **Larissa Haidner** – Hamburger SV – 2025–
- Adina Hamidović – SC Sand, Werder Bremen – 2017–2019
- Verena Hanshaw (née Aschauer) – Herforder SV, BV Cloppenburg, SC Freiburg, SC Sand, Eintracht Frankfurt - 2010–2011, 2013–2024
- Sandra Hausberger – Werder Bremen – 2015–2016
- Julia Hickelsberger-Füller – TSG Hoffenheim – 2022–2025
- **Sophie Hillebrand** – Hamburger SV – 2025–
- Marie-Therese Höbinger – Turbine Potsdam – 2019–2022
- Sabrina Horvat-Calò (née Horvat) – Werder Bremen, 1. FC Köln – 2018–2022
- Susanna Höller – VfL Sindelfingen – 2012–2013
- Magdalena Jakober – FF USV Jena, Borussia Mönchengladbach – 2012–2013, 2018–2019
- Virginia Kirchberger – BV Cloppenburg, MSV Duisburg, 1. FC Köln, SC Freiburg, Eintracht Frankfurt – 2013–2024
- Jennifer Klein – TSG Hoffenheim – 2019–2020
- Julia Kofler – Werder Bremen – 2018–2021
- **Lisa Kolb** – SC Freiburg – 2021–
- Simona Koren – MSV Duisburg – 2016–2017
- Kristin Krammer – 1. FC Nürnberg – 2023–2024
- Valentina Kröll – SGS Essen – 2023–2025
- Birgit Leitner – Bayern Munich – 2004–2005, 2007–2009
- Valentina Mädl – Bayer Leverkusen – 2025–
- Sophie Maierhofer – Werder Bremen, MSV Duisburg – 2015–2016, 2020–2021
- **Julia Magerl** – RB Leipzig, Werder Bremen – 2023–
- Lisa Makas – MSV Duisburg – 2016–2020
- Elisabeth Mayr – Bayer Leverkusen – 2018–2019
- **Katharina Naschenweng** – TSG Hoffenheim, Bayern Munich – 2019–
- **Linda Natter** – TSG Hoffenheim – 2025–
- **Nicole Ojukwu** – SC Freiburg – 2024–
- Jasmin Pal – SC Sand, 1. FC Köln – 2020–2025
- Viktoria Pinther – SC Sand, Bayer Leverkusen – 2018–2021
- Maria Plattner – Turbine Potsdam, Bayern Munich – 2020–2023, 2025–2026
- Nadine Prohaska – Bayern Munich, – 2010–2012, 2018–2020
- Jelena Prvulovic – MSV Duisburg – 2023–2024
- Sarah Puntigam – Bayern Munich, SC Freiburg, 1. FC Köln – 2010–2013, 2014–2018, 2022–2023
- **Lilli Purtscheller** – SGS Essen, Werder Bremen – 2023–
- Naika Reissner – Union Berlin – 2025–
- Larissa Rusek – 1. FC Nürnberg – 2025–2026
- Birgit Schalkhammer-Hufnagl – FCR 2001 Duisburg – 2001–2002
- **Annabel Schasching** – SC Freiburg, RB Leipzig – 2022–
- Katharina Schiechtl – Werder Bremen – 2015–2023
- Viktoria Schnaderbeck – Bayern Munich – 2010–2018
- Sonja Spieler – Bayern Munich – 2002–2008, 2009–2011
- Gertrud Stallinger – Bayern Munich – 2000–2004
- Elisabeth Tieber – VfL Sindelfingen – 2012–2013
- Lena Triendl – SC Sand, Werder Bremen – 2021–2023
- Yvonne Weilharter – 1. FFC Frankfurt – 2019–2020
- Claudia Wenger – Bayer Leverkusen – 2025–
- Carina Wenninger – Bayern Munich – 2008–2022
- Laura Wienroither – TSG Hoffenheim – 2018–2022
- Nike Winter – FF USV Jena – 2008–2009
- Annalena Wucher – Hamburger SV – 2025–2026
- **Sarah Zadrazil** – Turbine Potsdam, Bayern Munich – 2016–
- Manuela Zinsberger – Bayern Munich – 2014–2019

=== Azerbaijan ===
- **Nigar Mirzaliyeva** – Hamburger SV – 2025–

=== Belarus ===
- Anna Sas – Carl Zeiss Jena – 2021–2022
- Marina Lis – Turbine Potsdam – 2002–2003

=== Belgium ===
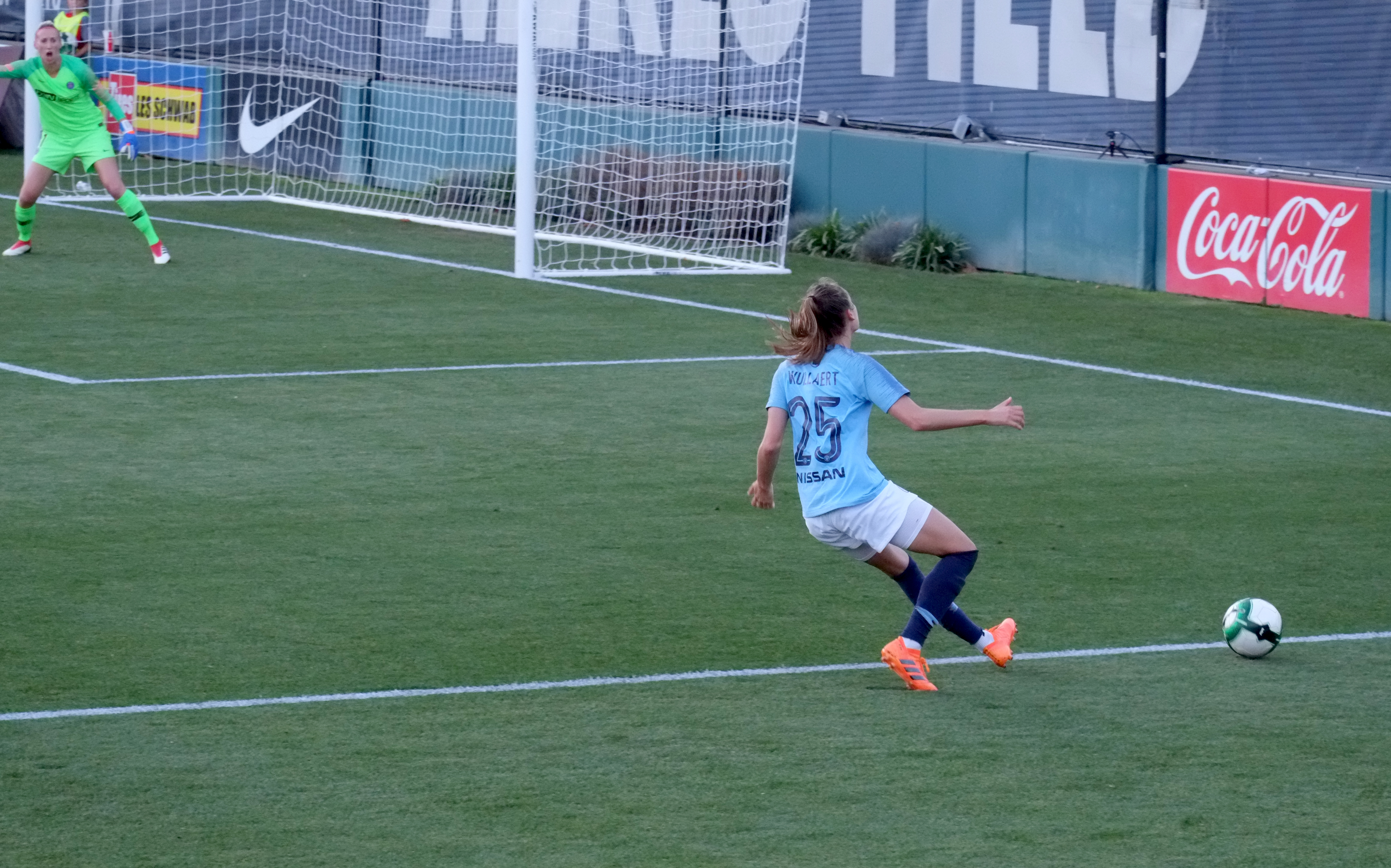
(Belgium) Tessa Wullaert

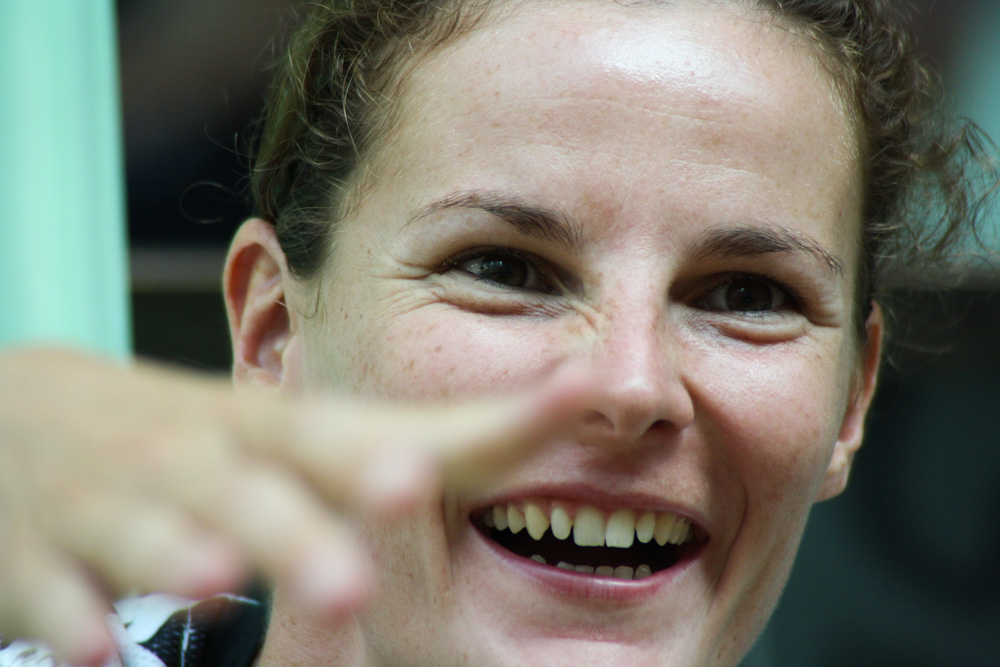
(Belgium) Femke Maes

- **Valesca Ampoorter** – TSG Hoffenheim – 2025–
- Jessy Atila – Herforder SV – 2010–2011
- Tine De Caigny – TSG Hoffenheim – 2021–2023
- **Féli Delacauw** – TSG Hoffenheim – 2024–
- Nadia Dermul – FCR 2001 Duisburg – 2002–2003
- **Elena Dhont** – Werder Bremen – 2026–
- **Hannah Eurlings** – Union Berlin – 2025–
- **Jill Janssens** – TSG Hoffenheim, Union Berlin – 2023–
- Heleen Jaques – Herforder SV, Turbine Potsdam – 2010–2011, 2012–2013
- Inge Heiremans – VfL Wolfsburg – 2004–2005
- Lisa Lichtfus – TSG Hoffenheim – 2026–
- Femke Maes – FCR 2001 Duisburg – 2009–2011
- Justien Odeurs – FF USV Jena – 2016–2018
- **Zenia Mertens** – RB Leipzig – 2026–
- **Jasmien Mathys** – RB Leipzig – 2026–
- **Jarne Teulings** – Eintracht Frankfurt – 2025–
- **Amber Tysiak** – Union Berlin – 2025–
- Justine Vanhaevermaet – SC Sand – 2018–2019
- Shari Van Belle – SGS Essen – 2025–2026
- **Luna Vanzeir** – Werder Bremen – 2026–
- **Aude Waldbillig** – RB Leipzig – 2026–
- Tessa Wullaert – VfL Wolfsburg – 2015–2018

=== Bosnia and Herzegovina ===
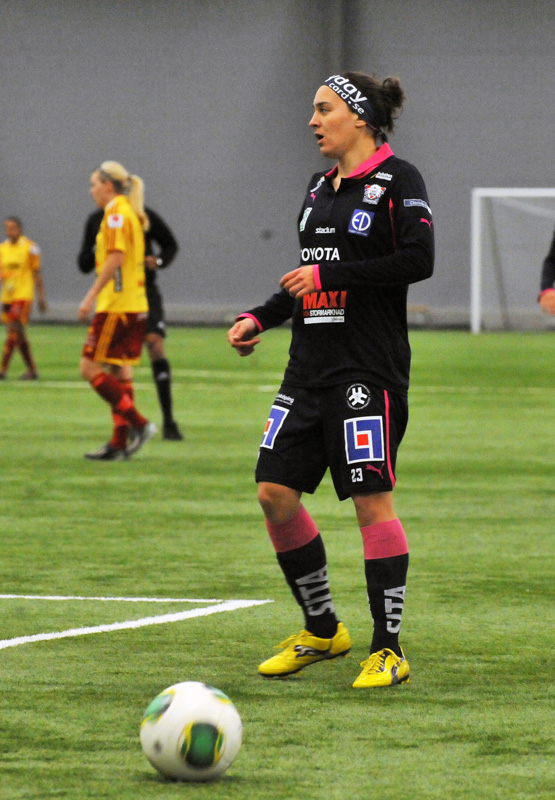
Lidija Kuliš

- Andrea Gavrić – Bayern Munich, 1. FC Köln – 2021–2024
- Amela Kršo – Turbine Potsdam – 2014–2015
- Lidija Kuliš – Turbine Potsdam, 1. FC Köln – 2011–2018
- Milena Nikolić – SC Sand, Bayer Leverkusen – 2016–2023
- Anida Salkanović – Bayern Munich – 2005–2007
- Gloria Slišković – Hamburger SV – 2025–2026
- Zemira Talundžić – 1. FC Saarbrücken – 2010–2011
- Ena Taslidža – Turbine Potsdam – 2024–2025

=== Bulgaria ===
- Lyubov Barutchiyska – 1. FC Saarbrücken – 2003–2004
- Atanaska Draganova - TSV Crailsheim, 1. FC Nürnberg - 1995-1997, 1999-2000
- Marina Manova - SC 07 Bad Neuenahr - 1995–1996, 1997–1999
- Violina Staneva – SC 07 Bad Neuenahr – 1997–1999
- Marina Weidenbach – SC 07 Bad Neuenahr – 1999–2001

=== Croatia ===
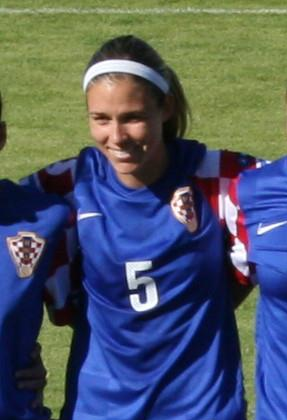
(Croatia) Allison Scurich

- Brankica Strbać-Drljača (née Drljača) – TuS Niederkirchen, TuS Wörrstadt, SC Klinge Seckach, 1. FFC Frankfurt – 1994–2001
- Iva Lažeta (née Landeka) – FF USV Jena – 2011–2016
- Ivana Rudelić – FF USV Jena, Bayer Leverkusen, Bayern Munich – 2008–2023
- Patricia Salkovic – FFC Brauweiler Pulheim – 2003–2004
- Allison Scurich – SC Sand – 2014–2015
- **Ivana Slipčević** – Bayern Munich, Mainz 05 – 2016–2017, 2026–
- Kristina Šundov – MSV Duisburg, Bayer Leverkusen – 2013–2016
- Sandra Žigić – FF USV Jena – 2017–2018
- Branka Lukic - TSV Ludwigsburg - 1991-1992

=== Czech Republic ===
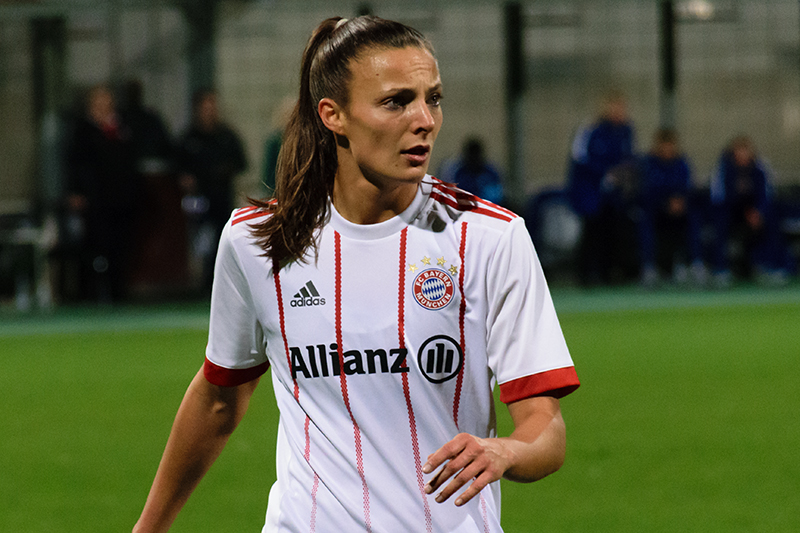
(Czech Republic) Lucie Voňková

- Klára Cahynová – Turbine Potsdam – 2017–2020
- Jitka Chlastáková – FF USV Jena – 2019–2020
- Gabriela Chlumecká – 1. FC Nürnberg – 1999–2000
- Aneta Polášková – 1. FC Nürnberg – 2025–2026
- Jana Petříková (née Sedláčková) – FF USV Jena – 2015–2018, 2019–2020
- Pavlína Ščasná – Bayern Munich – 2003–2006
- Dagmar Urbancová – Bayern Munich – 2003–2007
- Lucie Voňková – VfL Wolfsburg, MSV Duisburg, FF USV Jena, Bayern Munich – 2013–2019
- Marie Wasner-Tlachová (née Tlachová) – 1. FC Nürnberg – 1999–2000
- Andrea Svibkova - Hamburger SV - 2026

=== Denmark ===
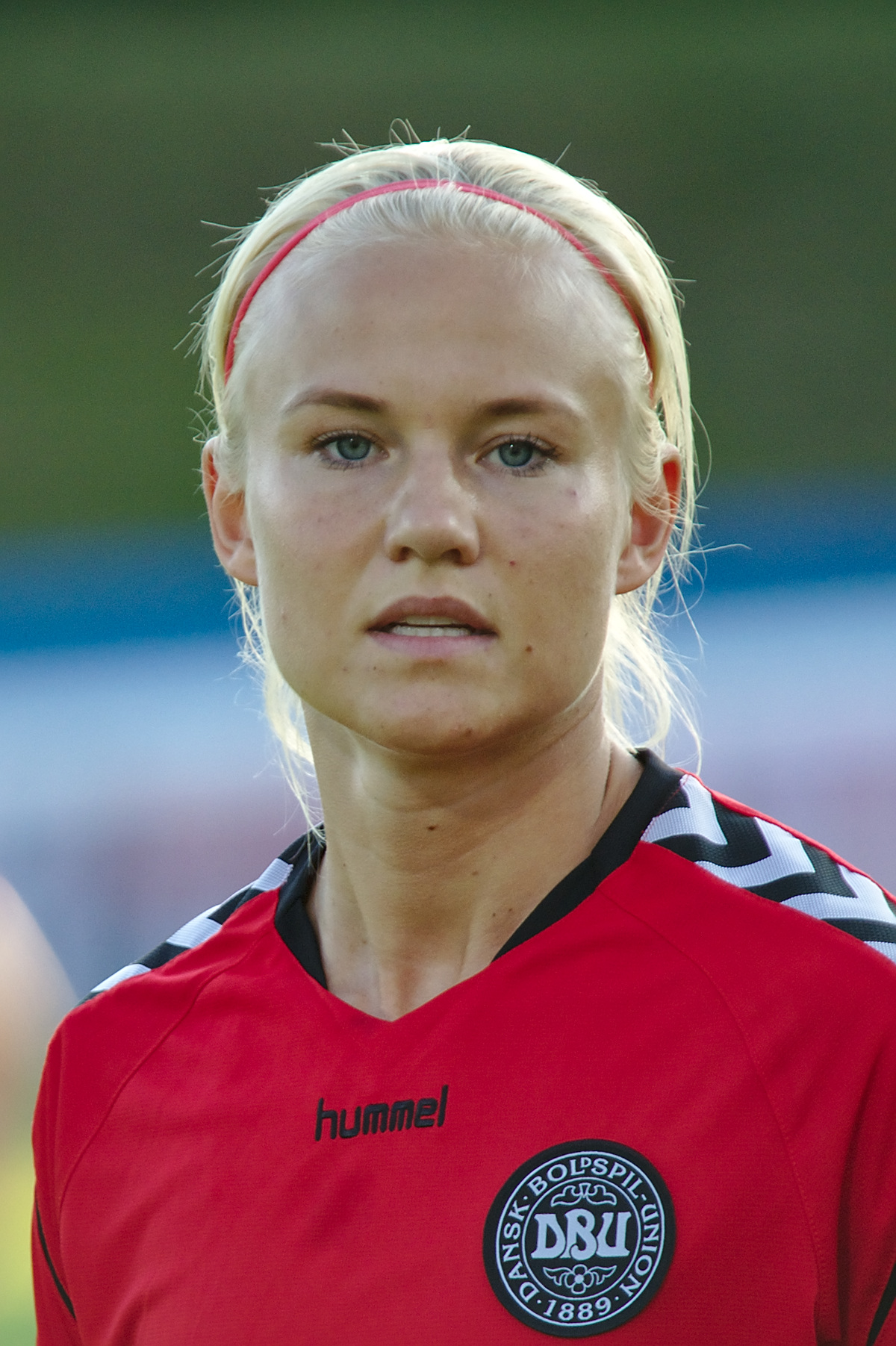
(Denmark) Pernille Harder won four Bundesliga titles with VfL Wolfsburg and two titles with Bayern Munich.

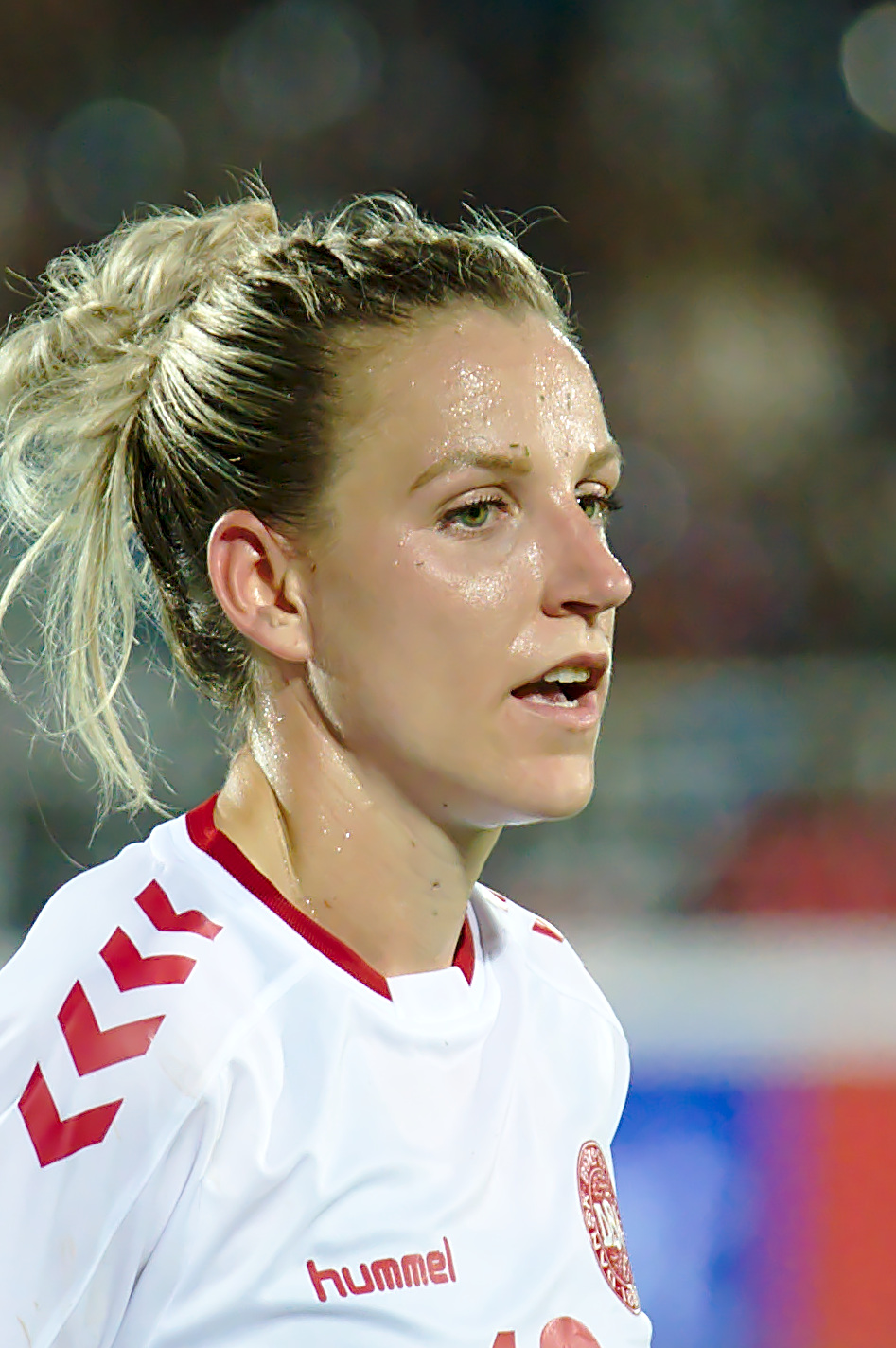
(Denmark) Cecilie Sandvej

- Alma Aagaard – Union Berlin – 2025–2026
- Maria Agerholm Kirchmann – SGS Essen – 2025–2026
- **Stine Ballisager** – Bayern Munich – 2025–
- Simone Boye Sørensen – Bayern Munich – 2019–2021
- Emilie Byrnak – TSG Hoffenheim – 2025–2026
- **Nikoline Dudek** – RB Leipzig – 2025–
- **Cecilie Fløe** – VfL Wolfsburg – 2026–
- Nina Frausing-Pedersen – Turbine Potsdam – 2014–2015
- Louise Hansen – Sportfreunde Siegen, 1. FFC Frankfurt – 1999–2001, 2003–2008
- **Pernille Harder** – VfL Wolfsburg, Bayern Munich – 2016–2020, 2023–
- Emilie Henriksen – MSV Duisburg – 2022–2024
- Karen Holmgaard – Turbine Potsdam – 2020–2022
- Sara Holmgaard – Turbine Potsdam – 2020–2022
- Cecilie Winther Johansen – Bayer Leverkusen – 2023–2024
- Janni Johansen – Sportfreunde Siegen – 1998–1999
- **Cornelia Kramer** – Bayer Leverkusen – 2024–
- Stina Lykke Borg – MSV Duisburg – 2013–2014
- Lise Munk – 1. FFC Frankfurt, 1. FC Köln – 2012–2013, 2015–2018
- Anne Nielsen – Sportfreunde Siegen – 2000–2001
- Gitte Pedersen – Hamburger SV – 1997–2001
- Merete Pedersen – Sportfreunde Siegen – 1999–2000
- Molli Plasmann – SC Sand – 2020–2022
- Louise Ringsing – Bayer Leverkusen – 2018–2019
- Cecilie Sandvej – SC Sand, 1. FFC Frankfurt – 2014–2019
- Pernille Sanvig – Eintracht Frankfurt – 2023–2025
- Karina Sefron – TSV Siegen, Sportfreunde Siegen, SG Praunheim, 1. FFC Frankfurt, FFC Brauweiler Pulheim – 1994–2002
- Karoline Smidt Nielsen – Turbine Potsdam – 2019–2021
- Sofie Svava – VfL Wolfsburg – 2020–2022
- Sofie Vendelbo – 1. FC Köln – 2023–2024

=== England ===
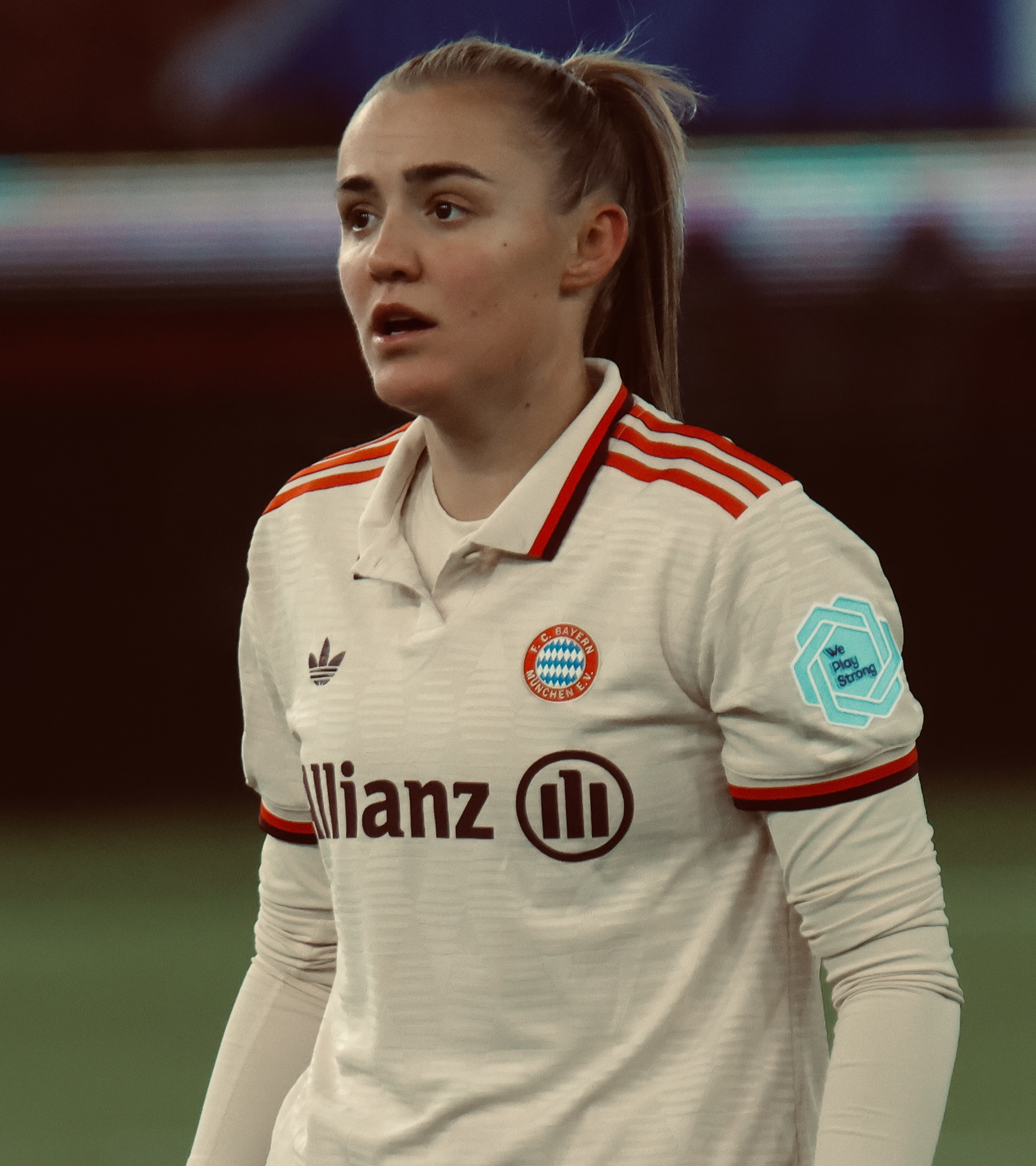
(England) Georgia Stanway

- Mary Earps – VfL Wolfsburg – 2018–2019
- Maria Edwards – SGS Essen – 2022–2024
- Leah Galton – Bayern Munich – 2017–2018
- **Ruby Grant** – Bayer Leverkusen – 2024–
- Jessica King – FF USV Jena – 2017–2018
- Mollie Rouse – Turbine Potsdam – 2022–2023
- Sarah Stainer – SC 07 Bad Neuenahr – 2000–2001
- Georgia Stanway – Bayern Munich – 2022–2026
- Vivienne Lia - FFC Frankfurt - 2026

=== Finland ===
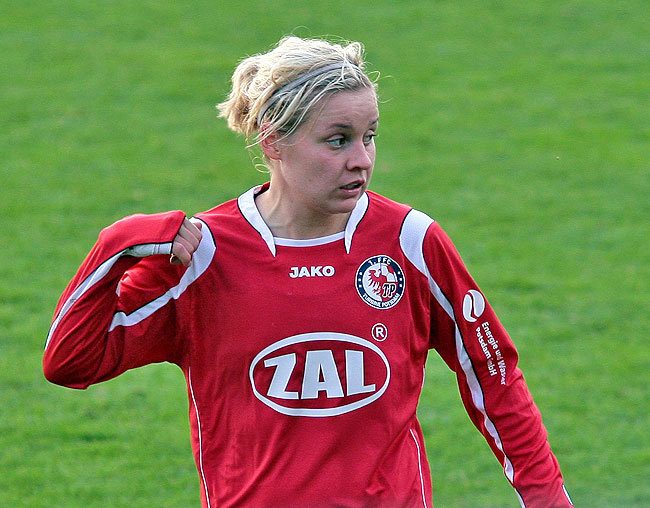
(Finland) Essi Sainio

- **Ida Heikkinen** – Union Berlin – 2025–
- Susanna Järvenpää – FSV Frankfurt – 2000-2001
- Tinja-Riikka Korpela – Bayern Munich – 2014–2018
- Taru Laihanen – SGS Essen – 2007–2008
- Dana Leskinen – 1. FC Nürnberg – 2023–2024
- Katri Mattsson (née Nokso-Koivisto) – VfL Wolfsburg – 2008–2010
- Milla Punsar – SV Meppen, SC Freiburg – 2022–2024
- Anna-Kaisa Rantanen – VfL Wolfsburg – 2009–2011
- Essi Sainio – Turbine Potsdam, SC Freiburg – 2006–2009, 2011–2012
- Katriina Talaslahti – Bayern Munich – 2018–2019

=== France ===
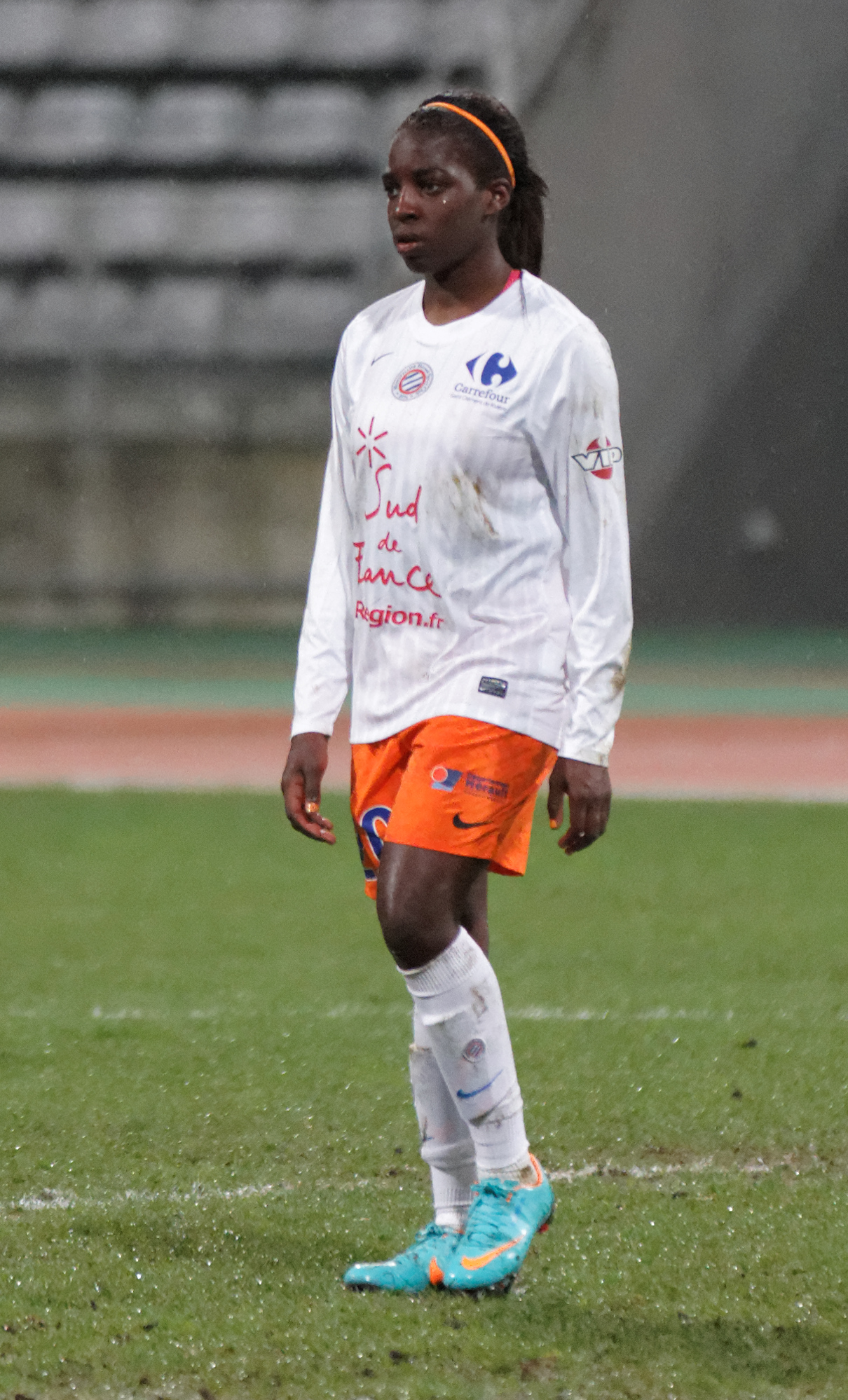
(France) Viviane Asseyi

- Leila Peneau - Hamburger SV - 2026
- Charline Coutel - Nurmberg - 2026
- Louna Lapassouse - Nurmberg - 2026
- Viviane Asseyi – Bayern Munich – 2020–2022
- Victoria Bissey – SC Sand – 2021–2022
- **Lou Bogaert** – VfL Wolfsburg – 2026–
- Sandrine Brétigny – 1. FFC Frankfurt – 2012–2013
- Élise Bussaglia – VfL Wolfsburg – 2015–2017
- **Kessya Bussy** – VfL Wolfsburg – 2025–
- Amélie Delabre – 1. FC Köln – 2024–2025
- **Magou Doucouré** – Hamburger SV – 2025–
- Noémie Freckhaus – SC Freiburg, SC Sand – 2008–2009, 2014–2015
- Marion Gavat – SC Sand – 2019–2022
- Laura Georges – Bayern Munich – 2017–2018
- Jeanne Haag – SC Freiburg, SC Sand – 2003–2004, 2005–2010, 2014–2015
- **Lou-Ann Joly** – RB Leipzig – 2024–
- Anne Kessler – SC Freiburg – 1998–1999, 2001–2002
- Sylvie Klopfenstein – SC Freiburg – 1998–2002
- Emelyne Laurent – Bayern Munich – 2022–2023
- Estelle Laurier – SGS Essen – 2020–2022
- Mélanie Lejeune – SC Freiburg – 2002–2003
- Karine Levy – SC Sand, SC Freiburg – 1996–1997, 2002–2006
- Valerie Maillard – SC Sand, SC Freiburg – 1996–1997, 1998–2006
- Marina Makanza – SC Freiburg, Turbine Potsdam – 2011–2013, 2015–2016
- Cosette Mercan – SC Sand – 1996–1997
- Fany Proniez – 1. FC Nürnberg – 2025–
- Maëlle Seguin – 1. FC Nürnberg – 2025–
- Almudena Sierra – Hamburger SV – 2025–2026
- Sophie Sillere – Bayern Munich – 1991–1992
- Ghislaine Steiner – SC Sand – 1996–1997
- Danielle Tolmais – SC Sand – 2020–2021
- Juliette Vidal – Bayer Leverkusen – 2024–2026
- Manon Wahl – SC Sand – 2019–2020
- Stéphanie Wendlinger – SC Freiburg, SC Sand – 2002–2004, 2008–2012, 2014–2016
- Élodie Woock – 1. FFC Frankfurt – 2002–2003

=== Greece ===
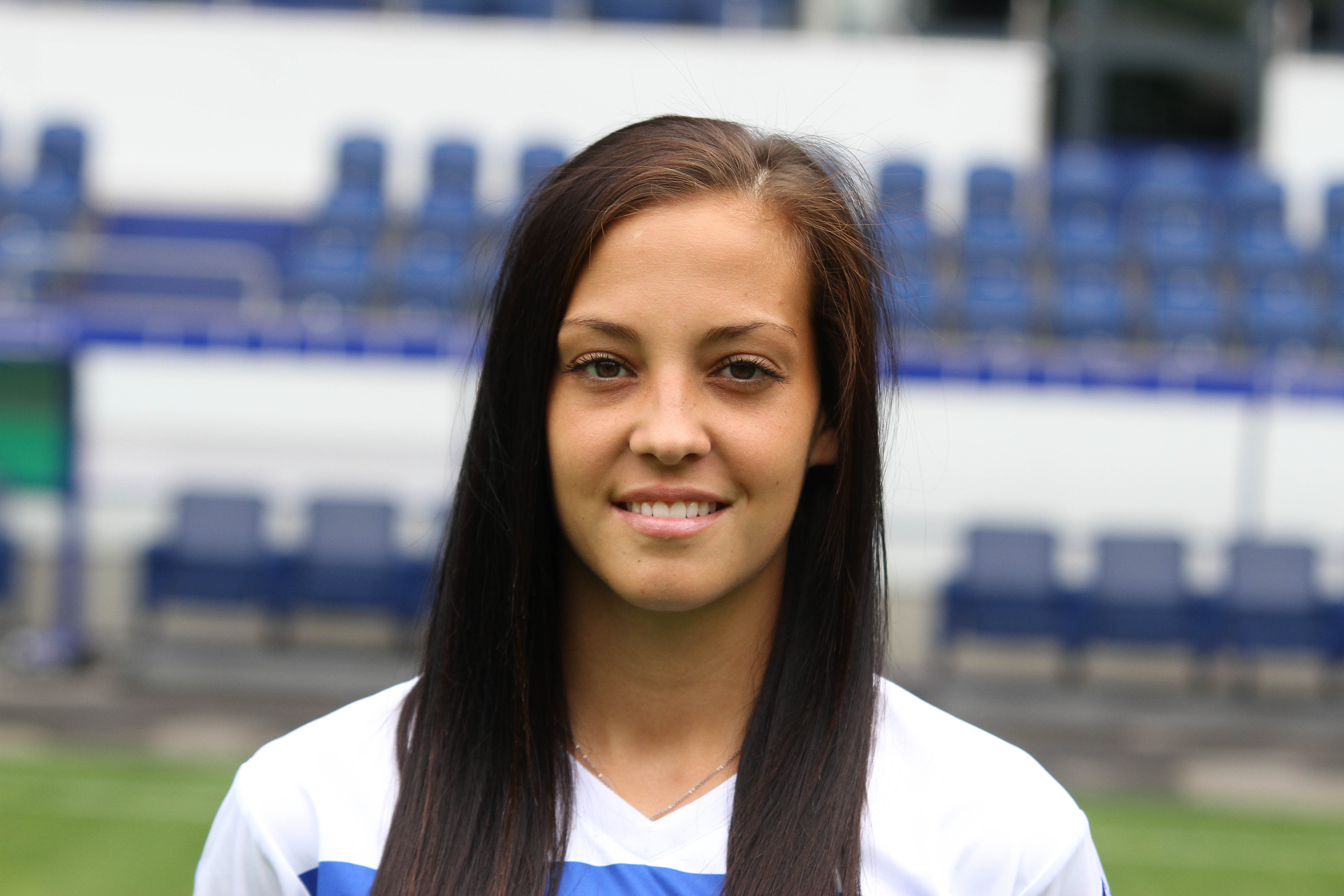
Sofia Nati

- Sofia Inguanta (née Nati) – SGS Essen, SC 07 Bad Neuenahr, MSV Duisburg, Werder Bremen – 2009–2010, 2011–2019
- Maria Lazarou – FC Rumeln-Kaldenhausen – 1994–1995
- Eleni Markou – SGS Essen, Eintracht Frankfurt – 2020–2021, 2025–2026
- Athanasia Moraitou – VfL Sindelfingen, SV Meppen, Union Berlin – 2013–2014, 2020–2021, 2022–2023, 2025–2026

=== Hungary ===
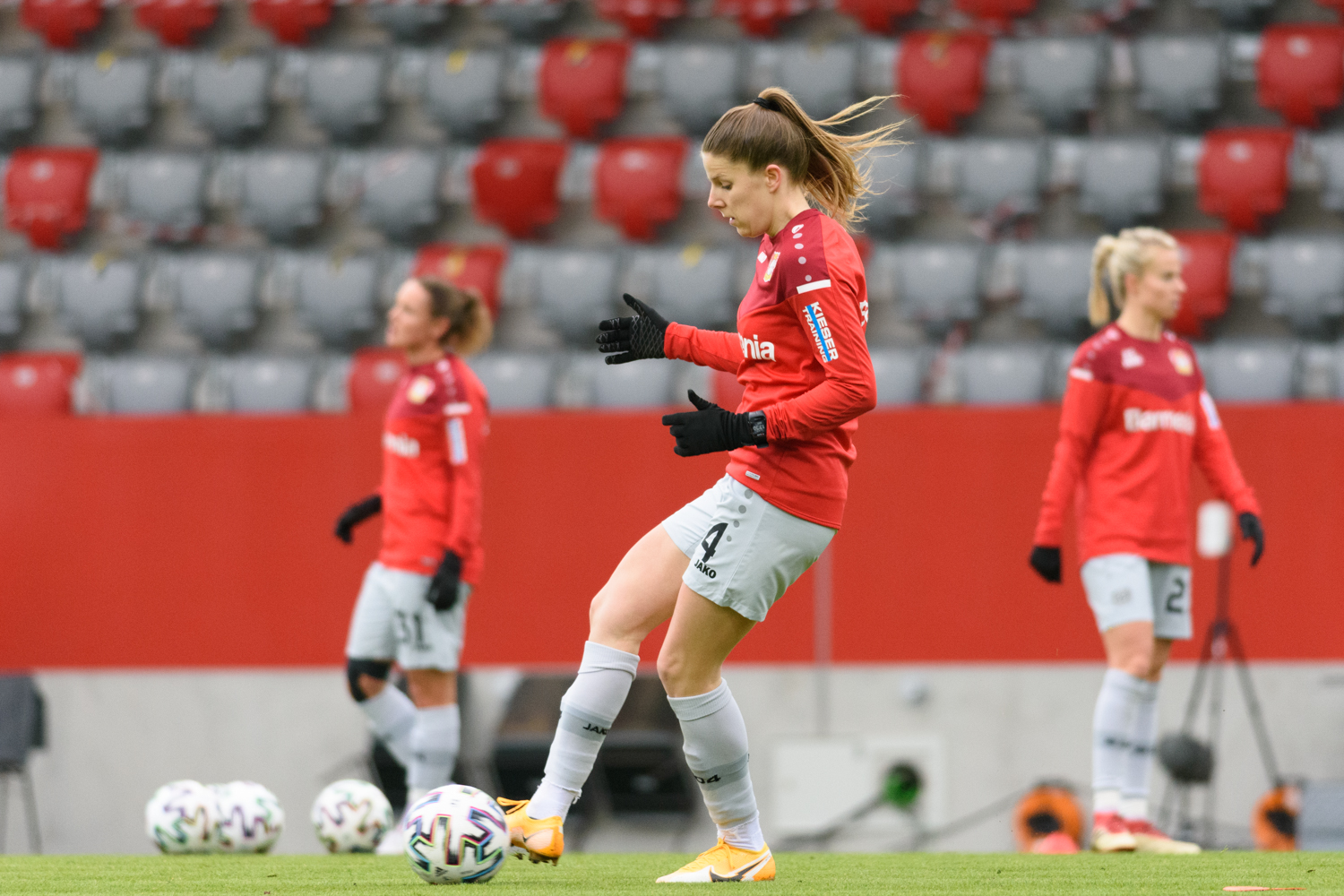
(Hungary) Lilla Turányi

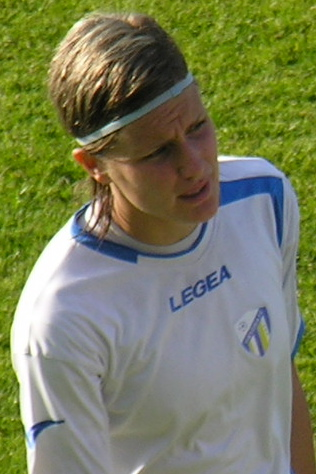
(Hungary) Alexandra Szarvas

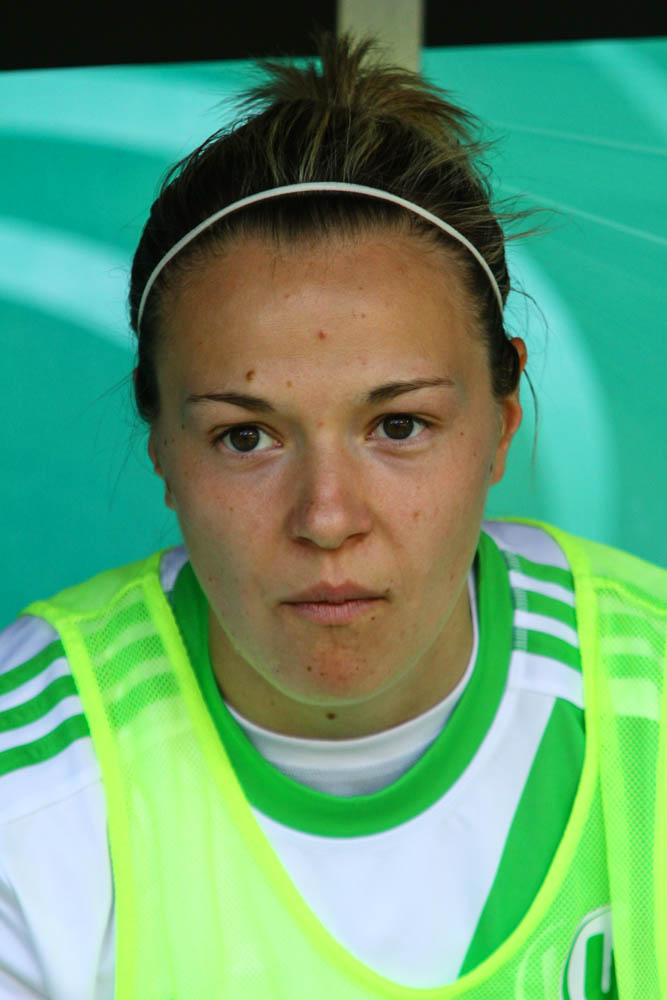
(Hungary) Zsanett Jakabfi played twelve Bundesliga seasons for VfL Wolfsburg. She won six championships and scored 70 goals in 191 matches.

- Maja Spilenberg - RB Leipzig - 2025-2026
- Ildiko Nagyabonyi - STV Lovenich - 1995-1996
- **Bori Turi** - Nurnberg - 2026-
- Sara Pusztai - RB Leipzig - 2026-
- Annamária Agócs – Grün-Weiß Brauweiler – 1992–1994, 1999–2001
- **Borbála Vincze** – SC Freiburg – 2026–
- Katalin Bökk – TuS Niederkirchen – 1997–1998
- Henrietta Csiszár – Bayer 04 Leverkusen – 2016–2017, 2018–2021
- Barbara Erdei – Sportfreunde Siegen – 1998–1999
- Beatrix Fördős – 1. FC Nürnberg – 2025–2026
- Beáta Fülöp – SG Praunheim, Sportfreunde Siegen, FCR 2001 Duisburg – 1994–2004
- Cecília Gáspár – TSV Crailsheim, SGS Essen – 2008–2010
- Zsanett Jakabfi – VfL Wolfsburg – 2009–2021
- Edit Kern – SG Praunheim, FSV Frankfurt – 1993–1996
- Petra Kocsán – TSG Hoffenheim – 2021–2023
- Gyöngyi Lovász – Grün-Weiß Brauweiler – 1992–1995
- Tünde Nagy – Grün-Weiß Brauweiler – 1992–2001, 2002–2004
- **Diána Németh** – VfL Wolfsburg – 2023–
- Hanna Németh – Werder Bremen – 2022–2026
- **Emőke Pápai** – Werder Bremen, 1. FC Nürnberg – 2024–
- **Luca Papp** – VfL Wolfsburg – 2024–
- Aranka Paraoánu – TuS Niederkirchen – 1997–1998
- Zsófia Rácz – MSV Duisburg – 2016–2017
- Napsugár Sinka – TSG Hoffenheim – 2024–2026
- Dóra Süle – SC Sand – 2020–2021
- Alexandra Szarvas – VfL Sindelfingen – 2012–2013
- Erika Szuh – Lokomotive Leipzig – 2011–2012
- Veronika Tájmel – TSV Crailsheim – 2008–2009
- Anna Terestyényi – Turbine Potsdam – 2024–2025
- Gabriella Tóth – Lokomotive Leipzig, Werder Bremen – 2011–2012, 2015–2022
- **Lilla Turányi** – Bayer Leverkusen – 2020–
- Fanny Vágó – TSV Crailsheim – 2007–2009
- Anna Vidovenyecz – VfL Sindelfingen – 2013–2014
- **Dóra Zeller** – TSG Hoffenheim, Bayer Leverkusen, 1. FC Köln – 2014–2022, 2023–

=== Iceland ===
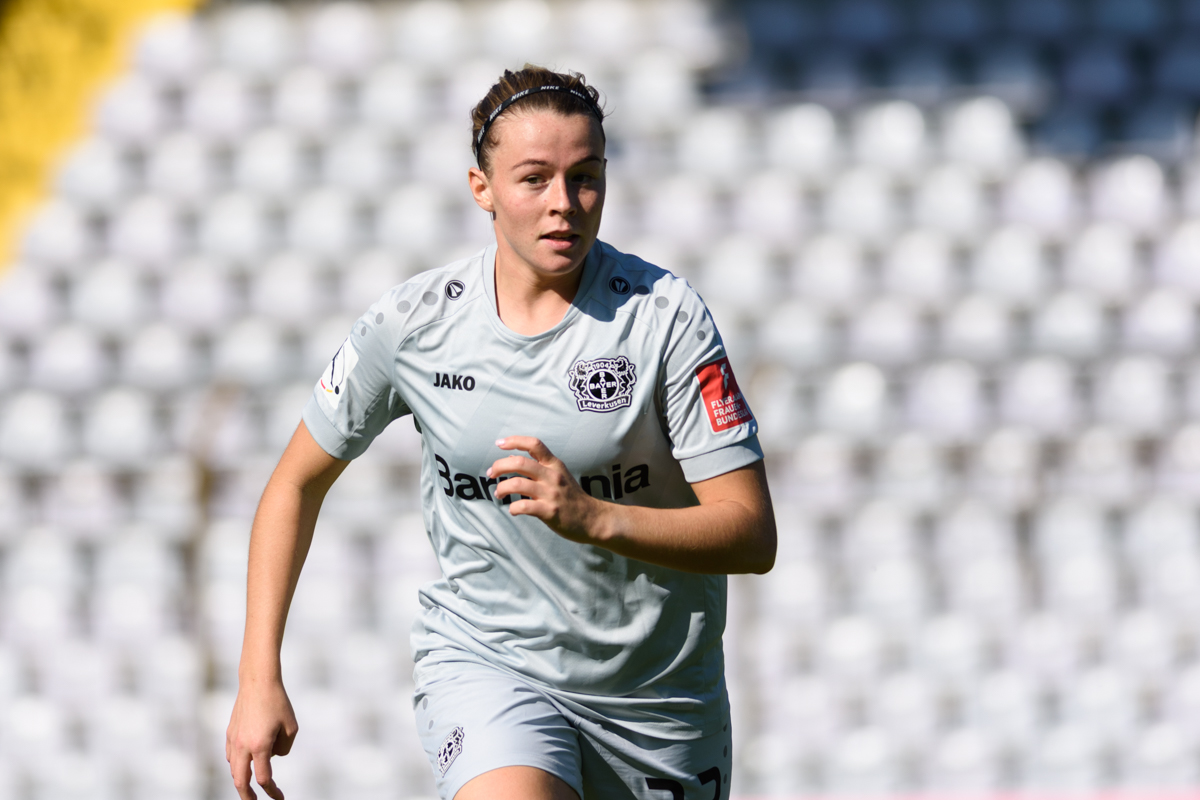
(Iceland) Sandra Jessen

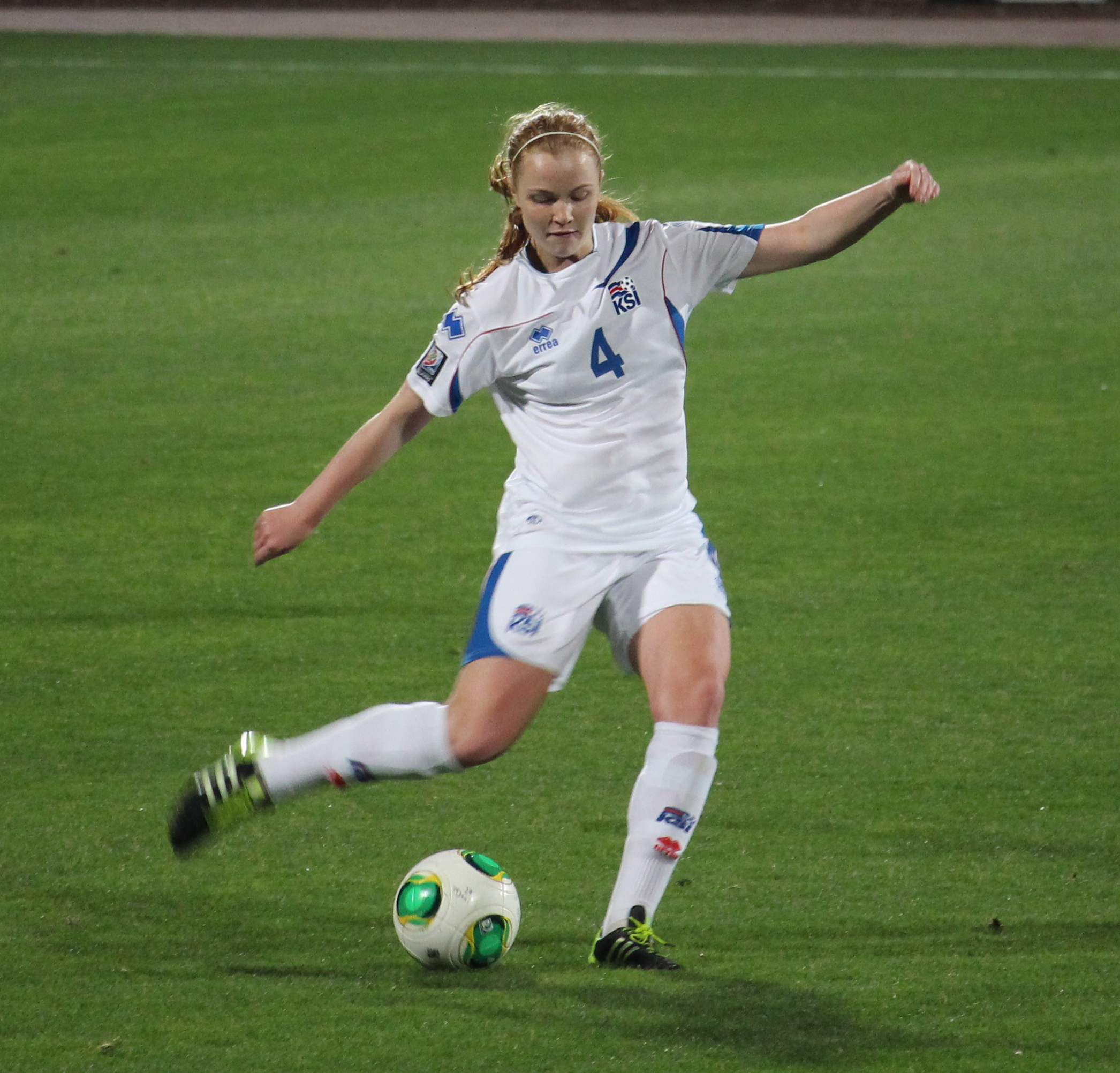
(Iceland) Glódís Perla Viggósdóittir

- **Emilía Kiær Ásgeirsdóttir** – RB Leipzig – 2024–
- Sif Atladóttir – 1. FC Saarbrücken – 2009–2011
- Dagný Brynjarsdóttir – Bayern Munich – 2014–2015
- Guðbjörg Gunnarsdóttir – Turbine Potsdam – 2013–2014
- Sara Björk Gunnarsdóttir – VfL Wolfsburg – 2016–2020
- **Sædís Rún Heiðarsdóttir** – 1. FC Köln – 2026–
- **Sandra Jessen** – Bayer Leverkusen, 1. FC Köln – 2015–2016, 2018–2021, 2025–
- Alexandra Jóhannsdóttir – Eintracht Frankfurt – 2020–2022
- Sveindís Jane Jónsdóttir – VfL Wolfsburg – 2021–2025
- Selma Sól Magnúsdóttir – 1. FC Nürnberg – 2023–2024
- Cecilía Rán Rúnarsdóttir – Bayern Munich – 2021–2022
- **Ingibjörg Sigurðardóttir** – MSV Duisburg, SC Freiburg – 2023–2024, 2025–
- Margrét Lára Viðarsdóttir – Turbine Potsdam – 2011–2012
- **Glódís Perla Viggósdóttir** – Bayern Munich – 2021–
- Karólína Lea Vilhjálmsdóttir – Bayern Munich, Bayer Leverkusen – 2021–2025

=== Ireland ===
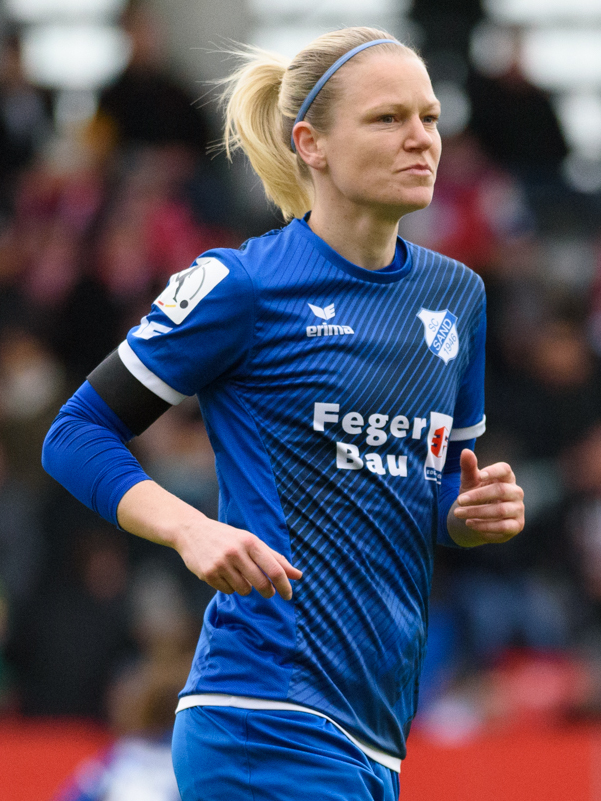
(Republic of Ireland) Diane Caldwell

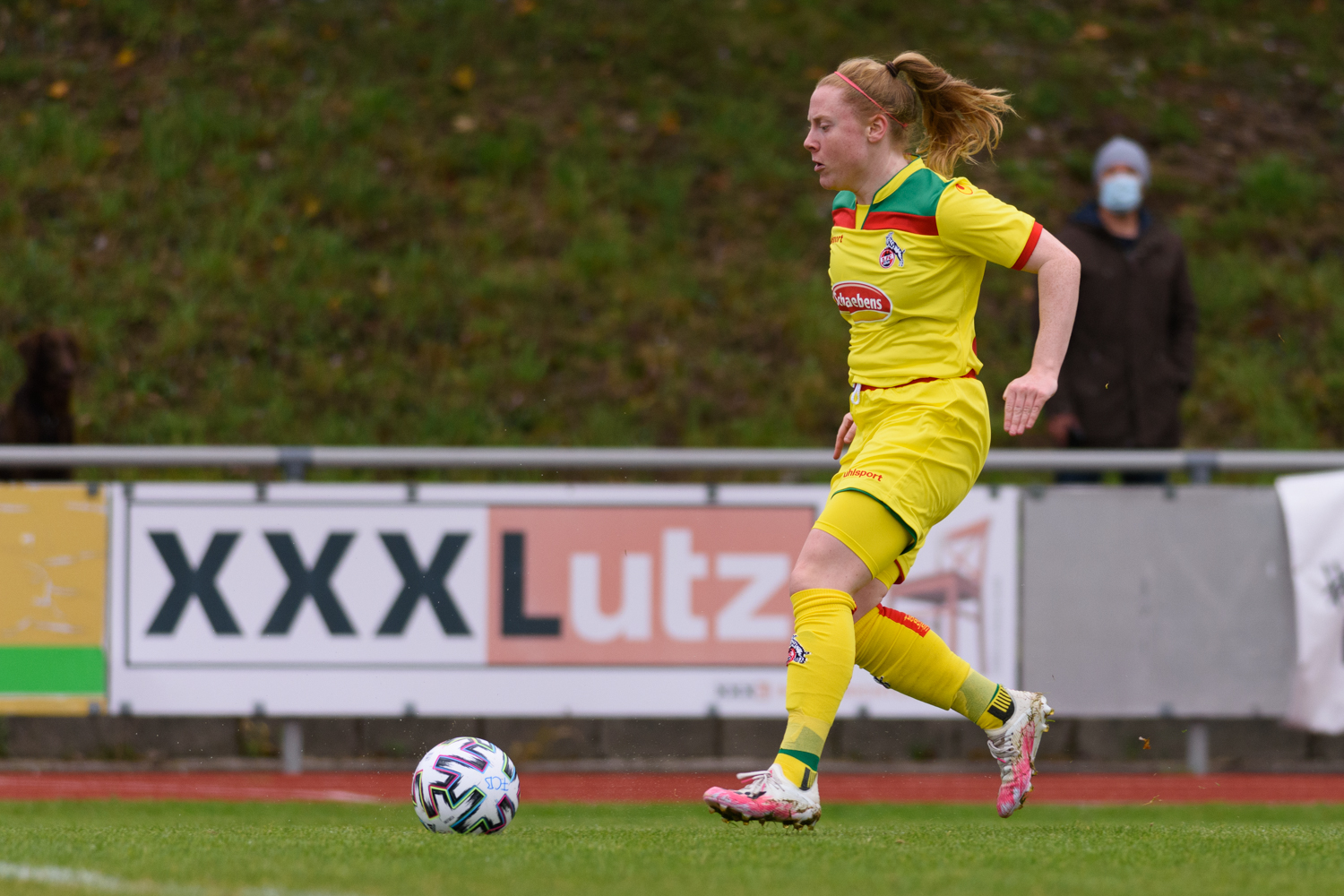
(Republic of Ireland) Amber Barrett

- Lily Agg – 1. FFC Frankfurt – 2017–2018
- Amber Barrett – 1. FC Köln, Turbine Potsdam – 2019–2020, 2021–2023
- Diane Caldwell – 1. FC Köln, SC Sand – 2015–2021
- Claire O'Riordan – MSV Duisburg – 2018–2021
- Fiona O'Sullivan – SC Freiburg – 2012–2014

=== Israel ===
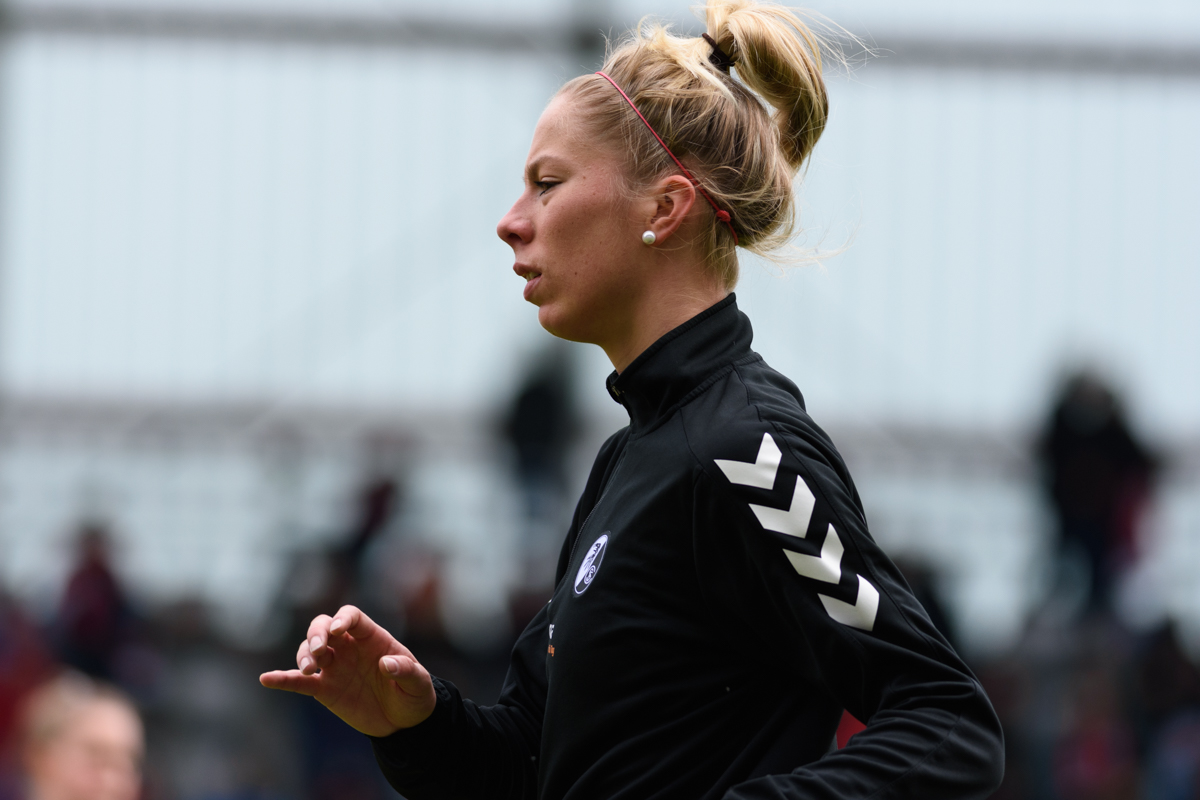
(Israel) Sharon Beck

- Sharon Beck – SGS Essen, Bayer Leverkusen, TSG Hoffenheim, SC Freiburg, 1. FC Köln, Werder Bremen – 2011–2020, 2021–2026
- Lee Falkon – MSV Duisburg – 2016–2017
- **Vital Kats** – Mainz 05 – 2026–
- Irena Kuznetsov– Turbine Potsdam – 2021–2023, 2024–2025
- Shahar Nakav – Turbine Potsdam – 2024–2025
- Shai Pearl – SC Sand – 2021–2022
- Noa Selimhodzic – Turbine Potsdam – 2022–2023, 2024–
- Sarit Shenar – Hamburger SV – 2007–2008

=== Italy ===
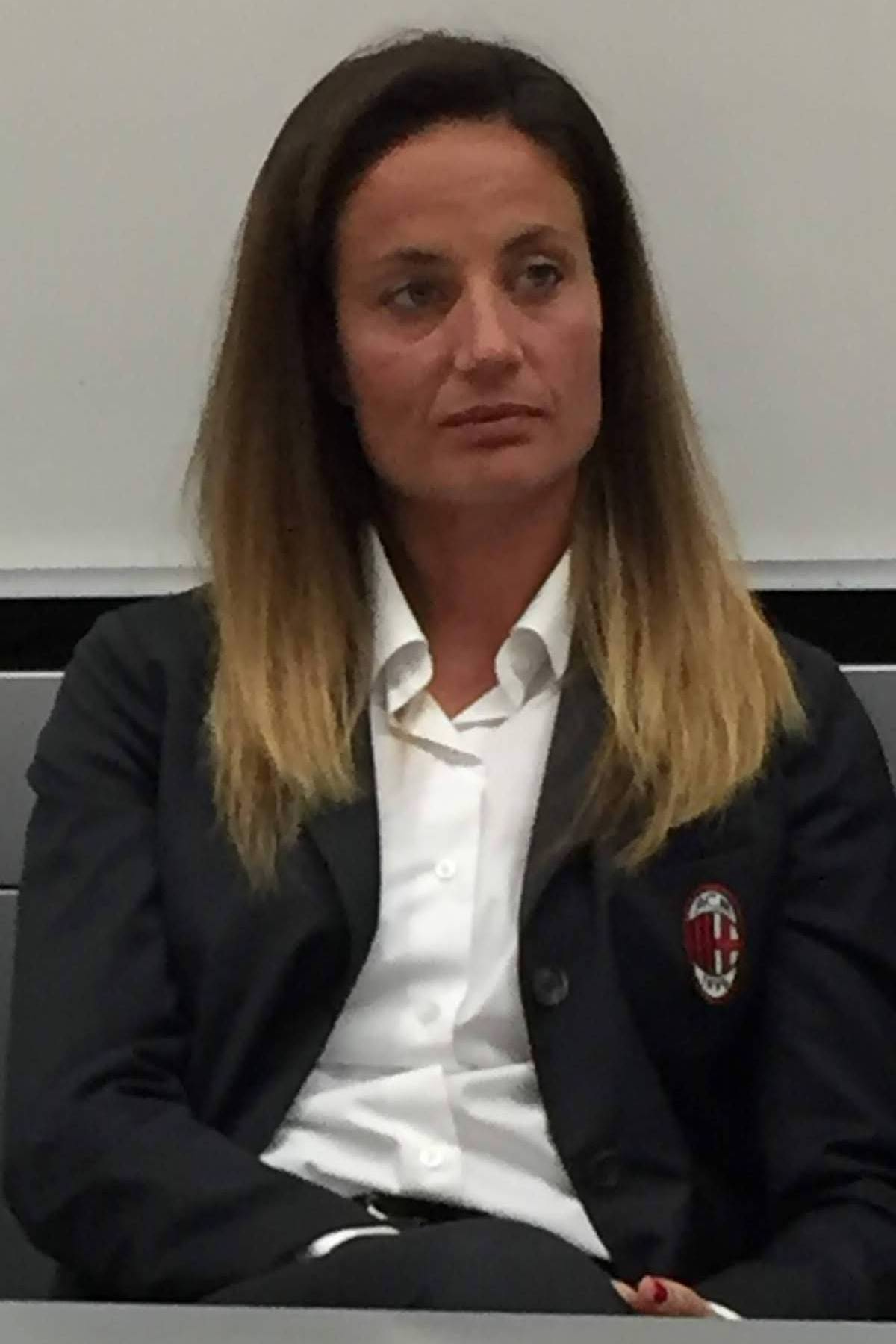
(Italy) Raffaella Manieri

- Arianna Caruso – Bayern Munich – 2024–2026
- Ilona Demirtas – SV Bergisch Gladbach 09, SC 07 Bad Neuenahr, FFC Brauweiler Pulheim – 1992–1994, 1997–2006
- Antonietta di Dio – FSV Frankfurt – 2005–2006
- Katalin Fodor – Grün-Weiß Brauweiler, FFC Flaesheim-Hillen – 1992–1995, 1999–2000
- Maria Frattallone – WSV Wolfsburg-Wendschott, VfL Wolfsburg – 2001–2005
- Vanessa Giangrasso – TSG Hoffenheim – 2013–2014
- **Laura Giuliani** – FSV Gütersloh 2009, Herforder SV, 1. FC Köln, VfB Stuttgart – 2012–2013, 2014–2016, 2026–
- Raffaella Manieri – Bayern Munich – 2013–2016
- Ilaria Mauro – SC Sand, Turbine Potsdam – 2014–2016
- Laura Neboli – FCR 2001 Duisburg – 2011–2014
- Carolina Pini – Bayern Munich – 2007–2008, 2009–2011
- Katja Schroffenegger – FF USV Jena – 2011–2013

=== Kosovo ===
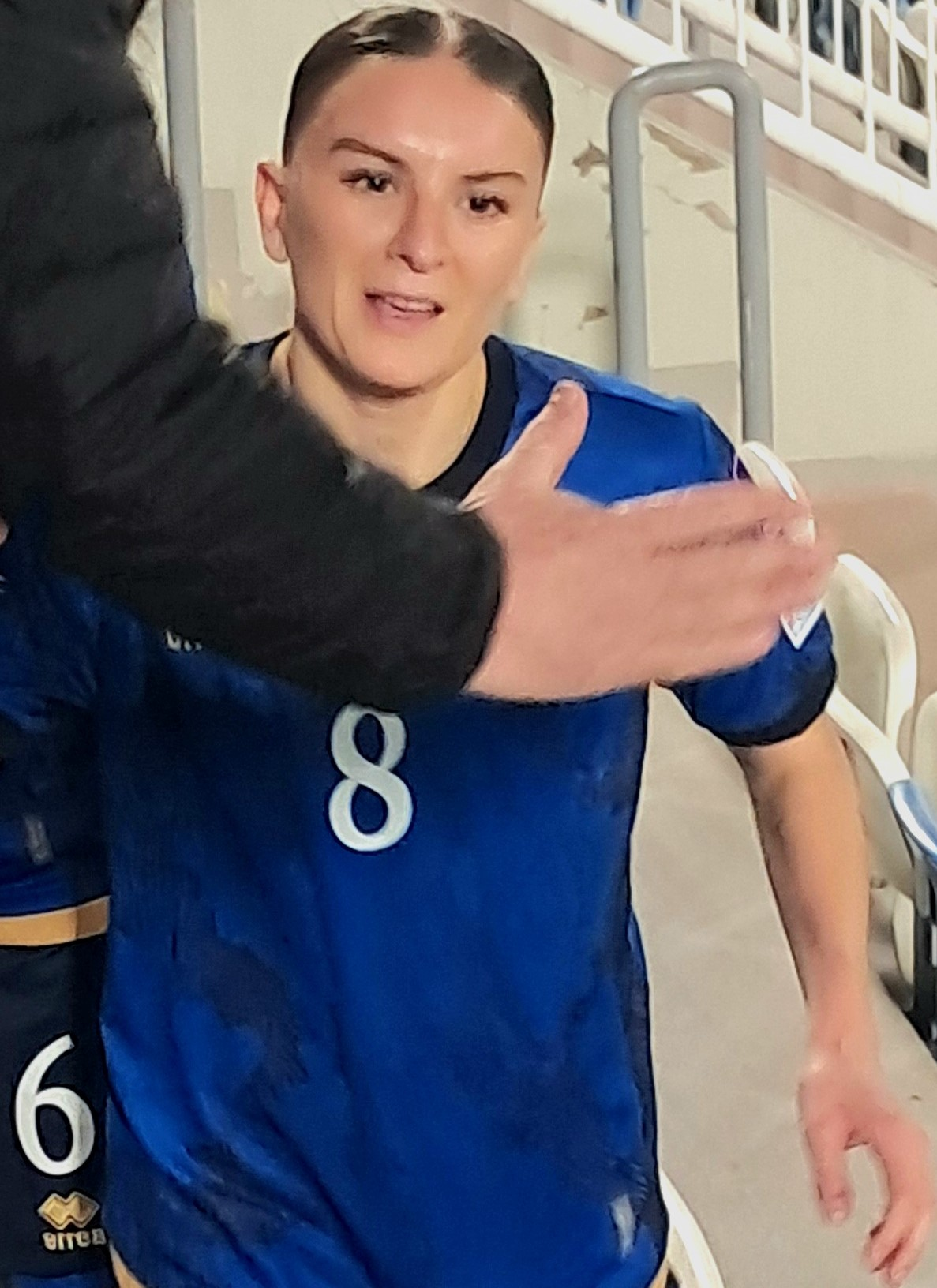
(Kosovo) Gentiana Fetaj

- Lumbardha Misini - Leverkusen - 2026
- Gentiana Fetaj – Carl Zeiss Jena – 2021–2022
- Donika Grajqevci – Carl Zeiss Jena – 2019–2020, 2021–2022
- Valentina Limani – 1. FFC Frankfurt, Turbine Potsdam – 2014–2015, 2016–2017, 2024–2025
- **Erëleta Memeti** – SC Freiburg, TSG Hoffenheim, Eintracht Frankfurt – 2020–
- Sara Sahiti – TSG Hoffenheim – 2025–

=== Latvia ===
- Sofija Ņesterova – Werder Bremen – 2024–2025
- Sandra Voitāne – SV Meppen – 2020–2021

=== Liechtenstein ===
- Lena Göppel – SGS Essen – 2023–2024

=== Luxembourg ===
- **Laura Miller** – 1. FC Nürnberg – 2025–

=== Montenegro ===
- **Medina Dešić** – 1. FC Nürnberg, Werder Bremen – 2023–2024, 2025–
- **Selma Ličina** – Werder Bremen, 1. FC Nürnberg – 2022–2023, 2025–

=== Netherlands ===
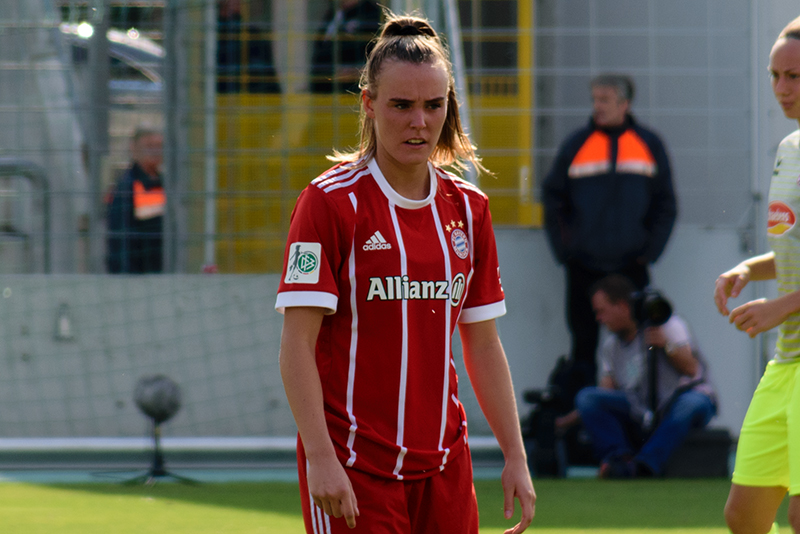
(Netherlands) Jill Roord

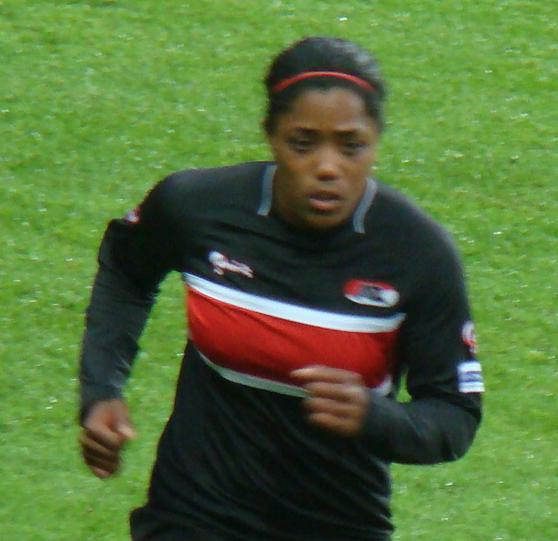
(Netherlands) Dyanne Bito

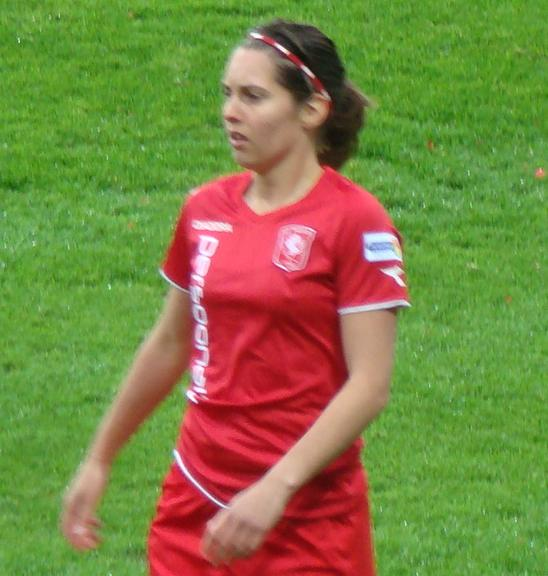
(Netherlands) Jolijn Heuvels

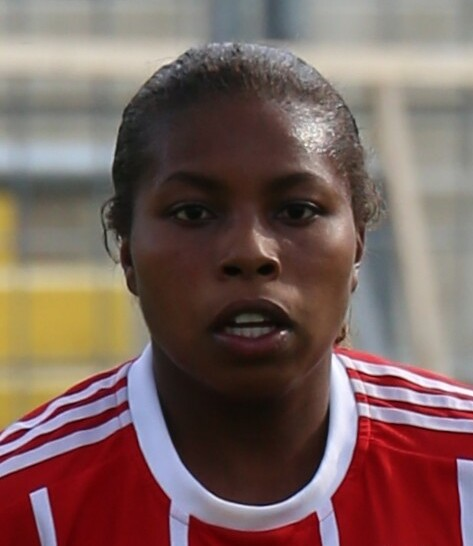
(Netherlands) Lineth Beerensteyn

- Liv Aerts – Borussia Mönchengladbach – 2016–2017
- Chantal Baghuis – Borussia Mönchengladbach – 2018–2019
- Jill Baijings – SGS Essen, Bayer Leverkusen, Bayern Munich – 2020–2024
- Eshly Bakker – MSV Duisburg – 2017–2018
- Lineth Beerensteyn – Bayern Munich, VfL Wolfsburg – 2017–2022, 2024–2026
- Ellen van Bergen – FCR Duisburg 55 – 1996–1998
- Dyanne Bito – Heike Rheine – 2004–2007
- Annika Blanke – Heike Rheine – 2002–2003
- **Justine Brandau** – Bayer Leverkusen – 2026–
- Dominique Bruinenberg – SC Sand – 2021–2022
- Loes Camper – TSV Siegen, FC Rumeln-Kaldenhausen – 1992-1995
- **Lieske Carleer** – VfL Wolfsburg – 2026–
- Anouk Dekker – Heike Rheine – 2005–2007
- Chantal de Ridder – Turbine Potsdam – 2011–2012
- Eva van Deursen – Bayer Leverkusen – 2023–2024
- **Nikée van Dijk** – TSG Hoffenheim, RB Leipzig – 2025–
- Caitlin Dijkstra – VfL Wolfsburg – 2024–2026
- **Lisa Doorn** – TSG Hoffenheim – 2023–
- **Wiëlle Douma** – TSG Hoffenheim – 2025–
- **Regina van Eijk** – Bayern Munich – 2026–
- Kim Everaerts – Borussia Mönchengladbach – 2018–2019
- Kelsey Geraedts – Borussia Mönchengladbach – 2016–2019
- Loes Geurts – Heike Rheine – 2006–2007
- Stefanie van der Gragt – Bayern Munich – 2016–2017
- Jackie Groenen – SGS Essen, MSV Duisburg, 1. FFC Frankfurt – 2011–2014, 2015–2019
- Amber van Heeswijk – Borussia Mönchengladbach – 2018–2019
- Jolijn Heuvels – Heike Rheine – 2004–2007
- Petra Hogewoning– FCR 2001 Duisburg – 2011–2012
- **Charlotte Hulst** – RB Leipzig – 2026–
- Dominique Janssen (formerly Bloodworth) – SGS Essen, VfL Wolfsburg – 2013–2015, 2019–2024
- Fenna Kalma – VfL Wolfsburg – 2023–2025
- Annemieke Kiesel – FCR 2001 Duisburg – 2005–2011
- Janou Levels – Bayer Leverkusen, VfL Wolfsburg – 2023–2026
- **Jonna van de Velde** TSG Hoffenheim – 2026–
- **Lobke Loonen** – Bayer Leverkusen – 2026–
- Desiree van Lunteren – SC Freiburg – 2018–2019
- Lieke Martens-van Leer (née Martens) – MSV Duisburg – 2012–2014
- Vivianne Miedema – Bayern Munich – 2014–2017
- Liesbeth Migchelsen – Heike Rheine – 2000–2005
- Myrthe Kemper-Moorrees – SC Sand, 1. FC Köln – 2019–2023
- Sandra Muller – Heike Rheine – 2000–2002
- **Ella Peddemors** – VfL Wolfsburg – 2024–
- Barbera Pisano – Heike Rheine – 2000–2001
- **Sophie Proost** – Bayern Munich – 2026–
- Marieke Ran – Heike Rheine – 2003–2005
- Pia Rijsdijk – MSV Duisburg, SC Sand – 2017–2018, 2019–2020
- Mirte Roelvink – FCR 2001 Duisburg, FF USV Jena, FSV Gütersloh 2009 – 2010–2013
- Jill Roord – Bayern Munich, VfL Wolfsburg – 2017–2019, 2021–2023
- Shanice van de Sanden – VfL Wolfsburg – 2020–2022
- Joelle Smits – VfL Wolfsburg – 2021–2022
- **Danique Tolhoek** – Eintracht Frankfurt – 2026–
- Jessica Torny – Heike Rheine – 2000–2006
- Marjan Veldhuizen – TSV Siegen, FC Rumeln-Kaldenhausen – 1992–1996
- **Alieke Tuin** – RB Leipzig – 2026–
- **Linde Veefkind** – RB Leipzig – 2026–
- Claudia Voňková (née van den Heiligenberg) – FF USV Jena – 2015–2017
- Jennifer Voss – Heike Rheine, SGS Essen, Herforder SV – 2005–2007, 2008–2009, 2010–2011
- Maruschka Waldus – Turbine Potsdam – 2015–2016
- Jacintha Weimar – Bayern Munich, SC Sand – 2018–2019, 2020–2021
- Lynn Wilms – VfL Wolfsburg – 2021–2025
- Marleen Wissink – Heike Rheine, SG Praunheim, 1. FFC Frankfurt – 1992–2006
- Siri Worm – Eintracht Frankfurt – 2021–2022

=== North Macedonia ===
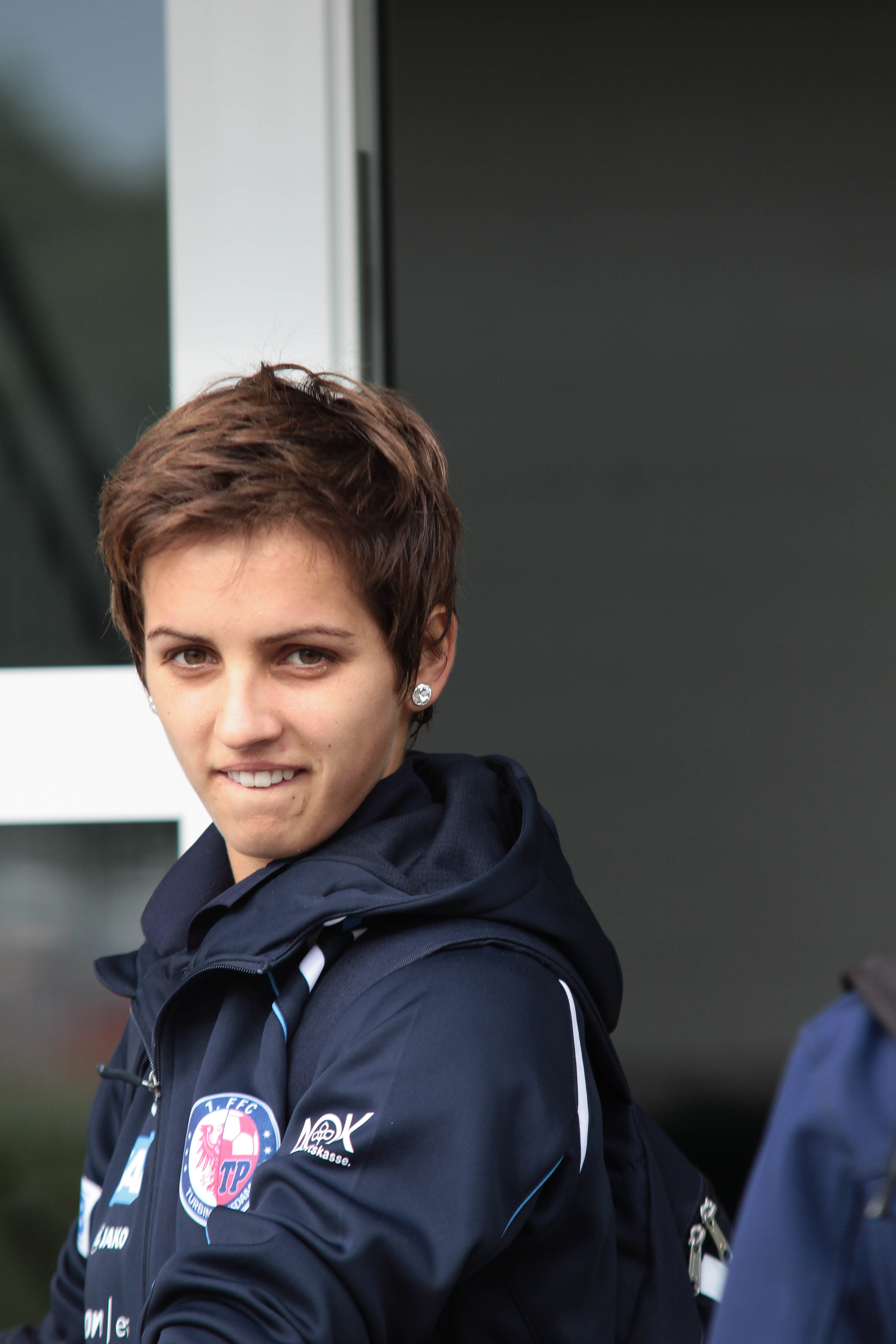
(North Macedonia) Nataša Andonova

- Nataša Andonova – Turbine Potsdam – 2010–2015
- Gentjana Rochi – BV Cloppenburg, Bayer Leverkusen – 2013–2014, 2016–2017

=== Norway ===
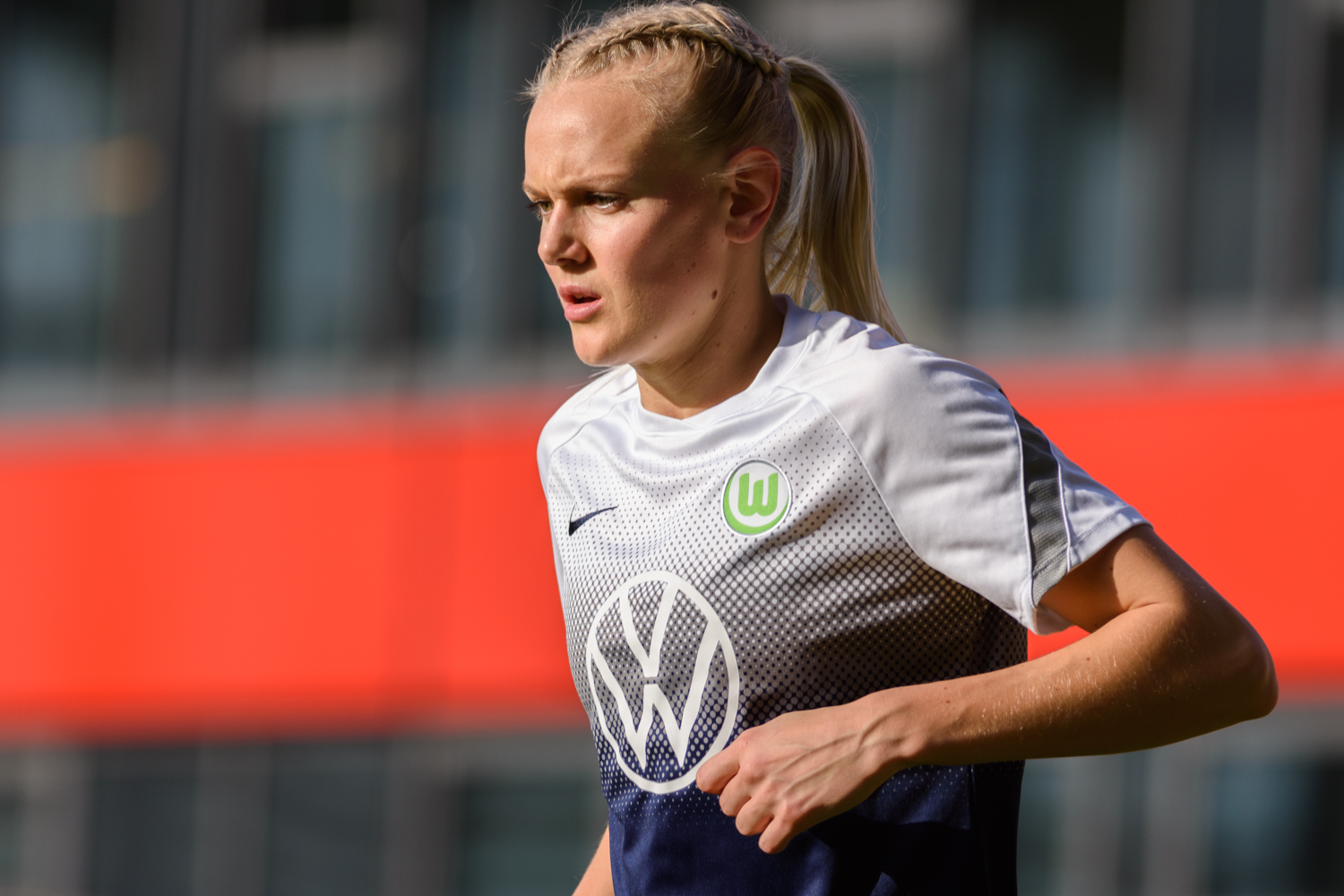
(Norway) Karina Sævik

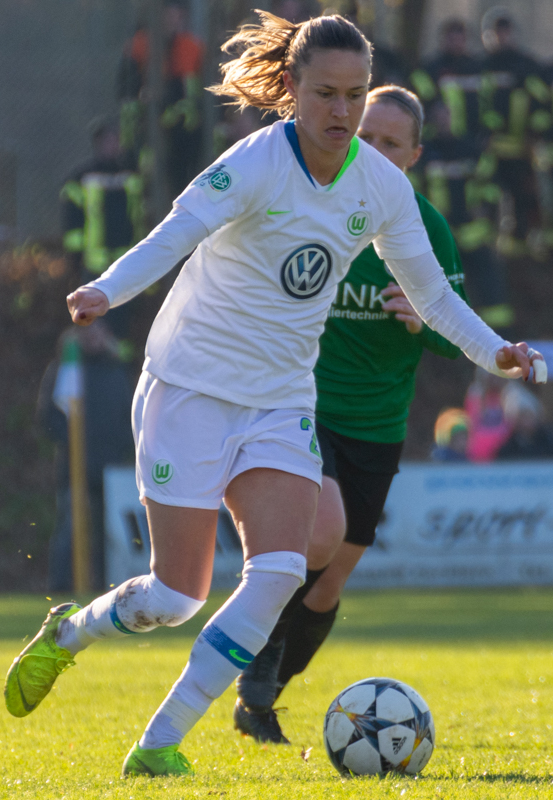
(Norway) Caroline Graham Hansen played 88 Bundesliga matches, scored 29 goals, and won three championships with VfL Wolfsburg.

- Elise Stenevik - FC Koln - 2026
- **Guro Bergsvand** – VfL Wolfsburg – 2025–
- **Thea Bjelde** – VfL Wolfsburg – 2025–
- Emilie Bragstad – Bayern Munich, Bayer Leverkusen – 2022–2025
- Caroline Graham Hansen – VfL Wolfsburg – 2014–2019
- **Martine Fenger** – TSG Hoffenheim – 2026–
- Tuva Hansen – Bayern Munich – 2022–2026
- Ada Hegerberg – Turbine Potsdam – 2012–2014
- Andrine Hegerberg – Turbine Potsdam – 2012–2013
- Silje Helgesen – Union Berlin – 2026–
- Nora Holstad Berge – Bayern Munich – 2013–2017
- Synne Jensen – VfL Wolfsburg – 2015–2016
- Julie Jorde – Bayer Leverkusen – 2023–2025
- Anny Kerim-Lindland – VfL Wolfsburg – 2026–
- **Justine Kielland** – VfL Wolfsburg – 2024–
- Leni Larsen Kaurin – Turbine Potsdam, 1. FFC Frankfurt, VfL Wolfsburg – 2007–2012
- **Camilla Linberg** – Hamburger SV – 2026–
- Aurora Mikalsen – 1. FC Köln – 2024–2026
- Kristine Minde – VfL Wolfsburg – 2017–2020
- Maren Mjelde – Turbine Potsdam – 2012–2014
- **Andrea Norheim** – RB Leipzig – 2025–
- **Marthine Østenstad** – Eintracht Frankfurt – 2025–
- Linnea Sælen – VfL Wolfsburg – 2026–
- Karina Sævik – VfL Wolfsburg – 2020–2021
- Synne Skinnes Hansen – Bayer Leverkusen – 2023–2025
- Ingrid Syrstad Engen – VfL Wolfsburg – 2019–2021
- Melissa Wiik – VfL Wolfsburg – 2009–2011

=== Poland ===
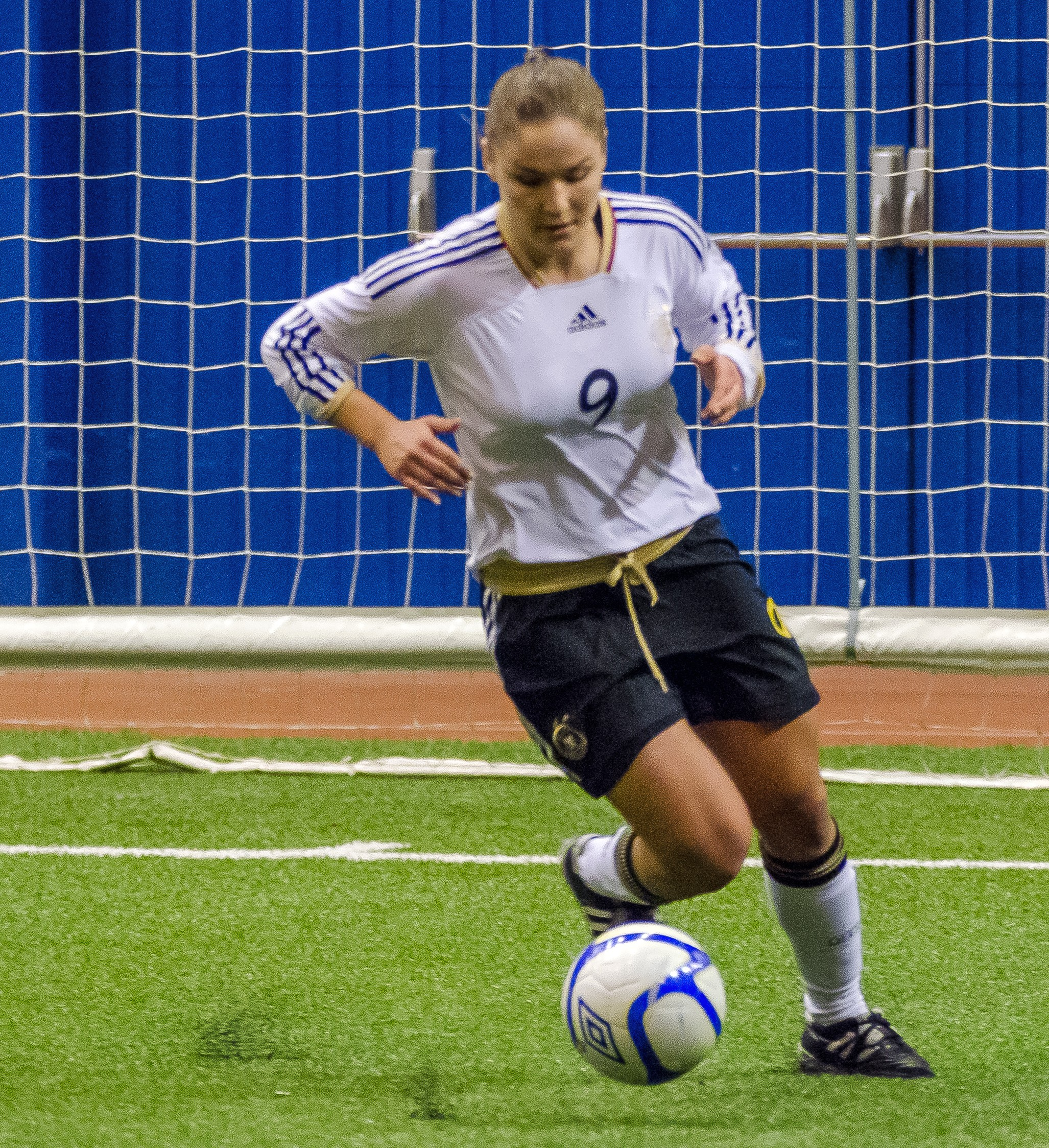
(Poland) Silvana Chojnowski

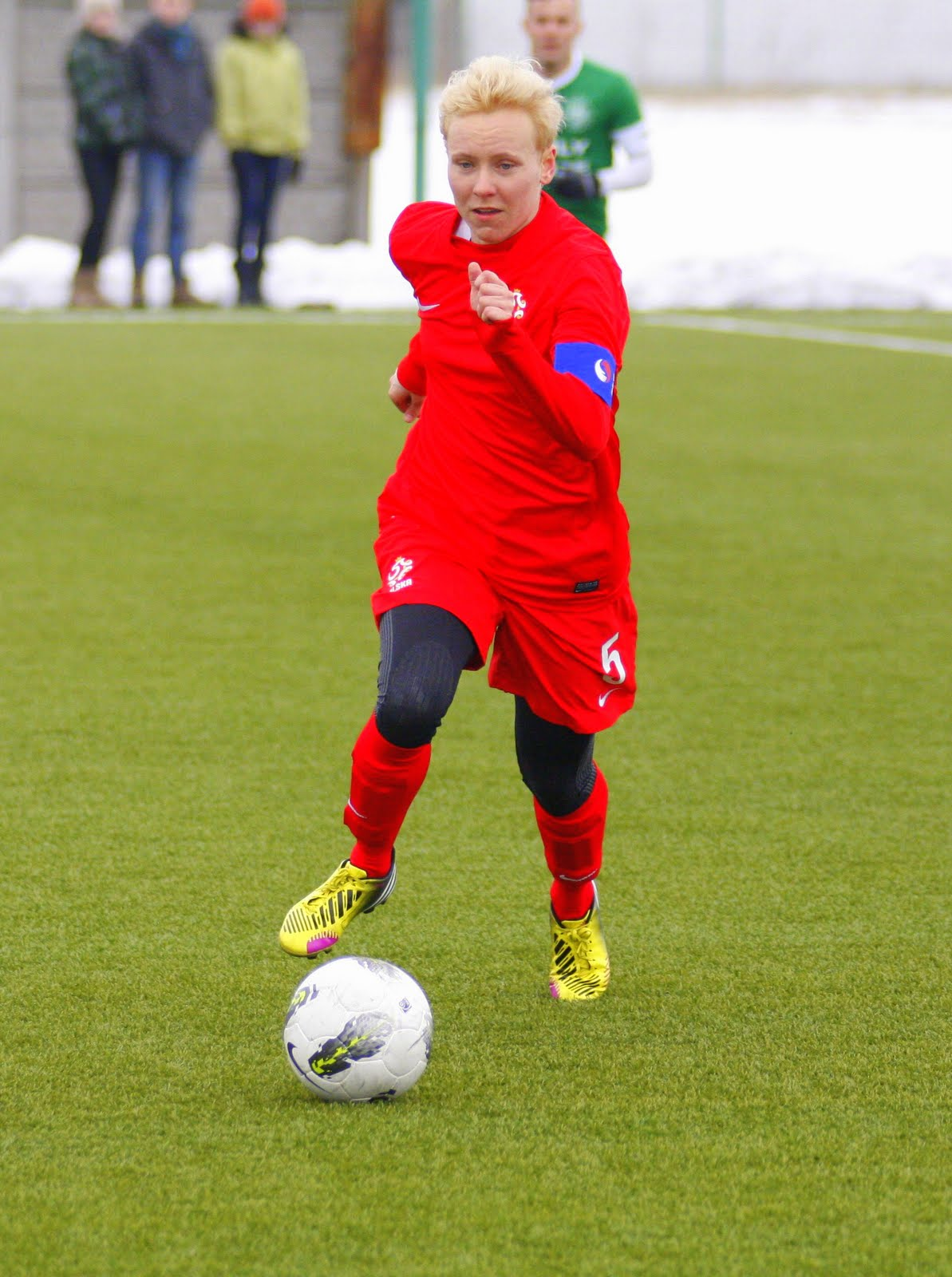
(Poland) Marta Stobba

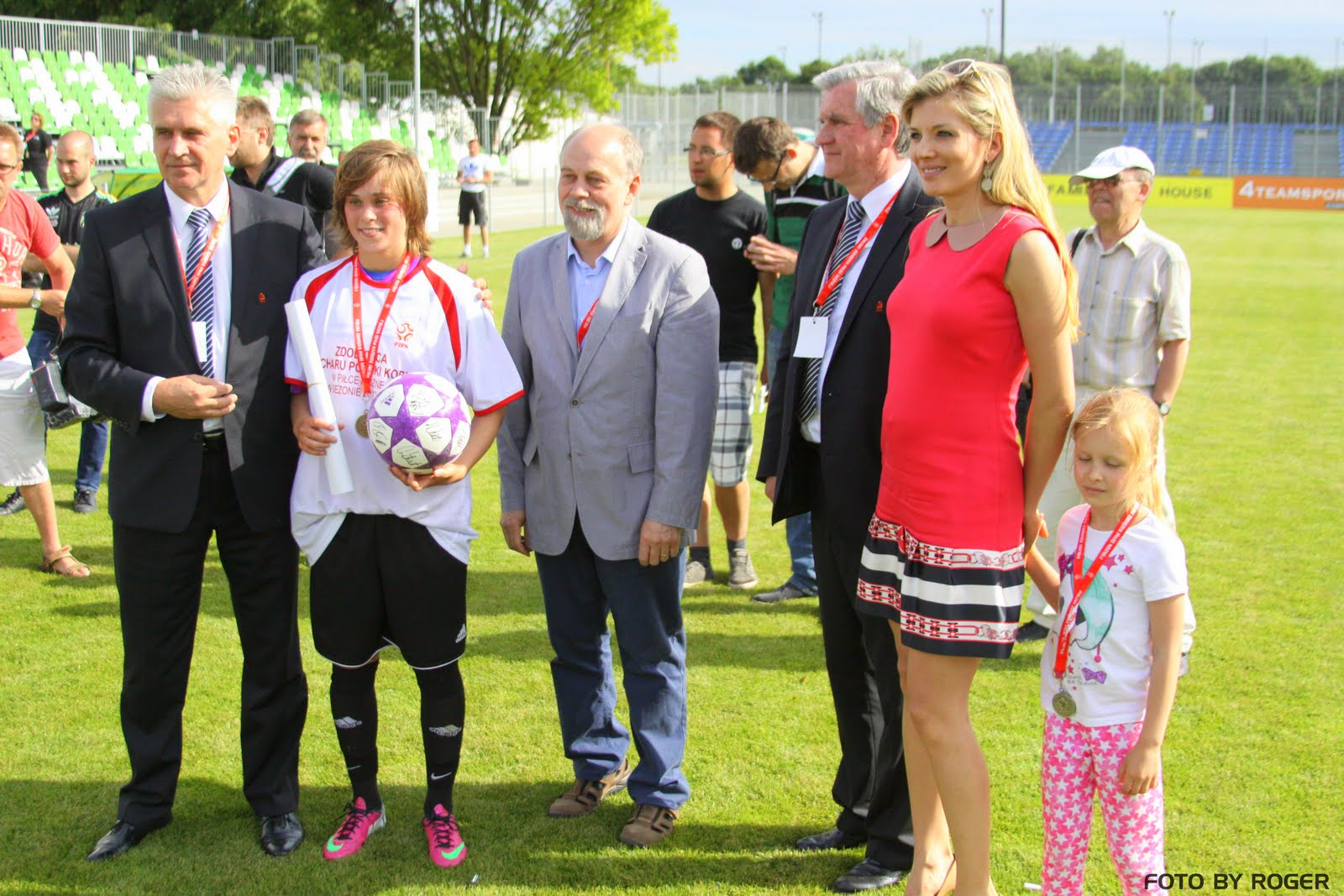
(Poland) Ewa Pajor

- Zuzanna Grzywinska - FC Nurnberg - 2026-
- Paulina Tomasiak - Leverkusen - 2026
- **Adriana Achcińska** – 1. FC Köln, VfB Stuttgart – 2021–
- Jolanta Adamska – TSV Crailsheim – 1996–1997
- **Weronika Araśniewicz** – VfL Wolfsburg – 2026–
- Patrycja Balcerzak – SC Sand – 2019–2022
- Silvana Chojnowski – 1. FFC Frankfurt, TSG Hoffenheim, SC Sand, 1. FC Köln – 2011–2018
- Symela Ciesielska – MSV Duisburg – 2017–2019
- Dominika Grabowska – TSG Hoffenheim – 2024–2026
- Kornelia Grosicka – Turbine Potsdam – 2024–2025
- Weronika Kaczor – 1. FC Nürnberg – 2023–2024
- Nikola Karczewska – Bayer Leverkusen – 2023–2024
- Katarzyna Kiedrzynek – VfL Wolfsburg – 2020–2022
- Marlena Kowalik – FCR 2001 Duisburg, SGS Essen – 2003–2011
- Anastazja Kubiak – SG Praunheim, WSV Wolfsburg-Wendschott – 1991–2001
- Agnieszka Leonowicz – Turbine Potsdam – 1998–2001
- Aleksandra Lesiak – SC 07 Bad Neuenahr, SG Praunheim, WSV Wolfsburg-Wendschott – 1993–1999
- Maria Makowska – Turbine Potsdam – 1995–2004
- Julia Matuschewski – 1. FFC Frankfurt – 2015–2018
- Sylwia Matysik – Bayer Leverkusen, 1. FC Köln – 2020–2026
- Małgorzata Mesjasz – Turbine Potsdam – 2019–2022
- Irena Mikołajczyk – SC 07 Bad Neuenahr – 1993–1994
- Beata Mociak – Turbine Potsdam – 1997–1998
- Jolanta Nieczypor – Heike Rheine, FCR Duisburg 55, WSV Wolfsburg-Wendschott – 1992–2003
- Marta Otrębska – Turbine Potsdam – 1998–1999
- Natalia Padilla – 1. FC Köln, Bayern Munich – 2023–2024, 2025–2026
- Ewa Pajor – VfL Wolfsburg – 2015–2024
- Grazyna Palus – SG Praunheim – 1993–1998
- **Tanja Pawollek** – Eintracht Frankfurt, Union Berlin – 2016–
- Patrycja Pożerska – MSV Duisburg – 2013–2014
- Hanna Serocka – SG Praunheim, 1. FFC Frankfurt, Sportfreunde Siegen – 1996–2001
- Jolanta Siwińska – Turbine Potsdam – 2015–2017
- Marta Stobba – BV Cloppenburg – 2013–2014
- Magdalena Szaj – Turbine Potsdam – 2014–2016
- Agata Tarczyńska – 1. FC Saarbrücken, MSV Duisburg, Werder Bremen – 2009–2010, 2013–2014, 2020–2023
- Jana Teodoridis – Tennis Borussia Berlin – 2008–2010
- Martyna Wiankowska – Turbine Potsdam, 1. FC Köln – 2022–2026
- Agnieszka Winczo – BV Cloppenburg, SC Sand, SV Meppen – 2013–2014, 2019–2021
- Dominika Wylężek – BV Cloppenburg – 2013–2014
- Oliwia Woś – 1. FC Nürnberg – 2025–2026
- **Weronika Zawistowska** – 1. FC Köln, Bayern Munich – 2021–
- **Wiktoria Zieniewicz** – Werder Bremen – 2026–
- Kinga Szemik - Hamburger SV - 2026

=== Portugal ===
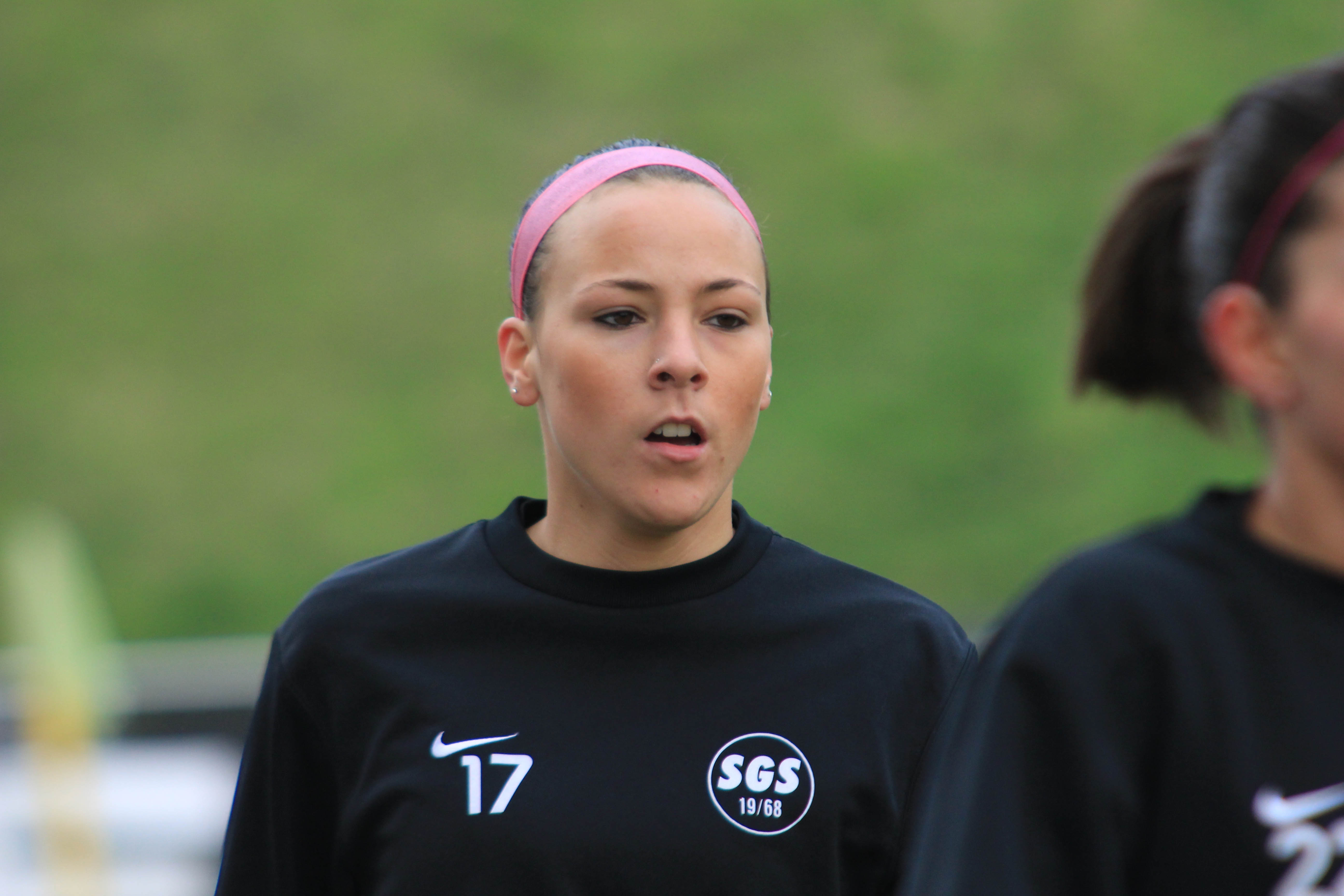
(Portugal) Ana Leite

- Mafalda Borboz - FC Nurnberg - 2026-
- Carole Costa – SGS Essen, MSV Duisburg – 2010–2015
- Ana Leite – FCR 2001 Duisburg, SGS Essen, Bayer Leverkusen – 2007–2008, 2009–2014, 2016–2019
- Laura Luís – MSV Duisburg, FF USV Jena – 2013–2015, 2016–207
- Cláudia Neto – VfL Wolfsburg – 2017–2020
- Andreia Norton – SC Sand – 2018–2019
- Sandra Ribeiras – VfL Sindelfingen - 1993–1994, 1996–1997, 2005–2006
- Dolores Silva – MSV Duisburg, FF USV Jena – 2011–2017

=== Romania ===
- Mariana Ciorba – FFC Brauweiler Pulheim – 2002–2007
- Manuela Ducan – VfL Wolfsburg – 2002–2005
- Elena Mladin – FFC Brauweiler Pulheim – 2006–2007
- Alexandra Muresan – FFC Brauweiler Pulheim – 2005–2006
- Oana Niculescu – FFC Brauweiler Pulheim – 2002–2007

=== Russia ===
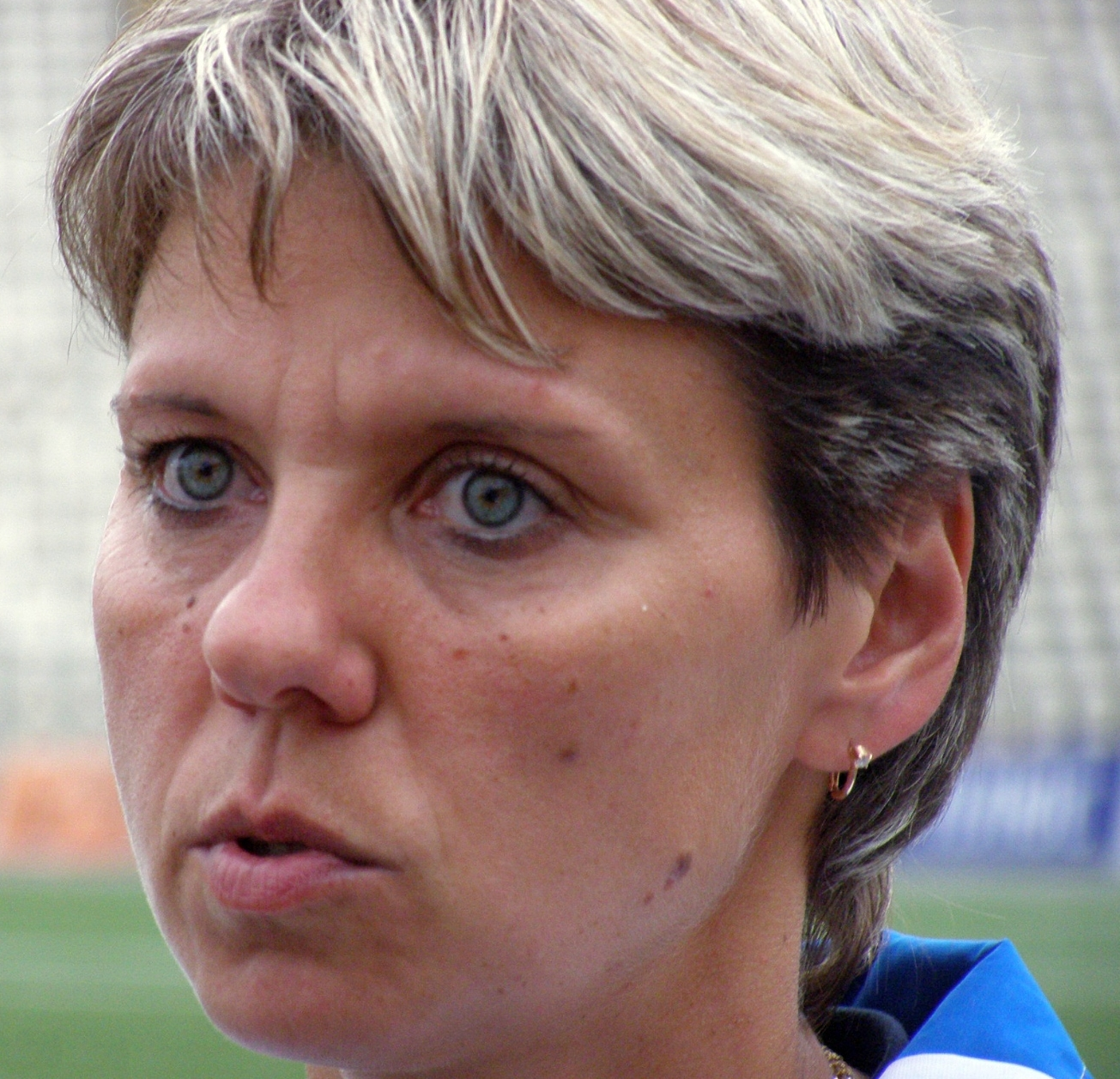
(Russia) Tatiana Egorova

- Alexsandra Lobanova - Nurmberg - 2026
- Valentina Barkowa – Turbine Potsdam – 1995–1997
- Nadezhda Bosikova – SC Klinge Seckach – 1997–1998
- Mogamedowna Botaschowa – Turbine Potsdam – 1994–1995
- Natalia Bunduki – Turbine Potsdam, Tennis Borussia Berlin – 1994–2003
- Marina Burakova – FFC Flaesheim-Hillen – 2000–2001
- Tatiana Cheverda – SC Klinge Seckach – 1997–1998
- Elena Denchtchik – WSV Wolfsburg-Wendschott – 2000–2001
- Alena Dmitrenko – SC Klinge Seckach – 1997–1998
- Tatiana Egorova – Turbine Potsdam – 1994–1995
- Irina Grigorieva – Turbine Potsdam – 1994–1995
- Rezeda Khalimdarova – SC Klinge Seckach – 1997–1998
- Marina Kolomiets – SC Klinge Seckach – 1997–1998
- Irina Petriayeva – FFC Flaesheim-Hillen – 2000–2001
- Valentina Pilipenko – WSV Wolfsburg-Wendschott – 2000–2001
- Vera Stroukova – SC Klinge Seckach – 1997–1998
- Alla Volkova – SC Klinge Seckach – 1997–1998
- Tatiana Zaytseva – FFC Flaesheim-Hillen – 2000–2001

=== Scotland ===
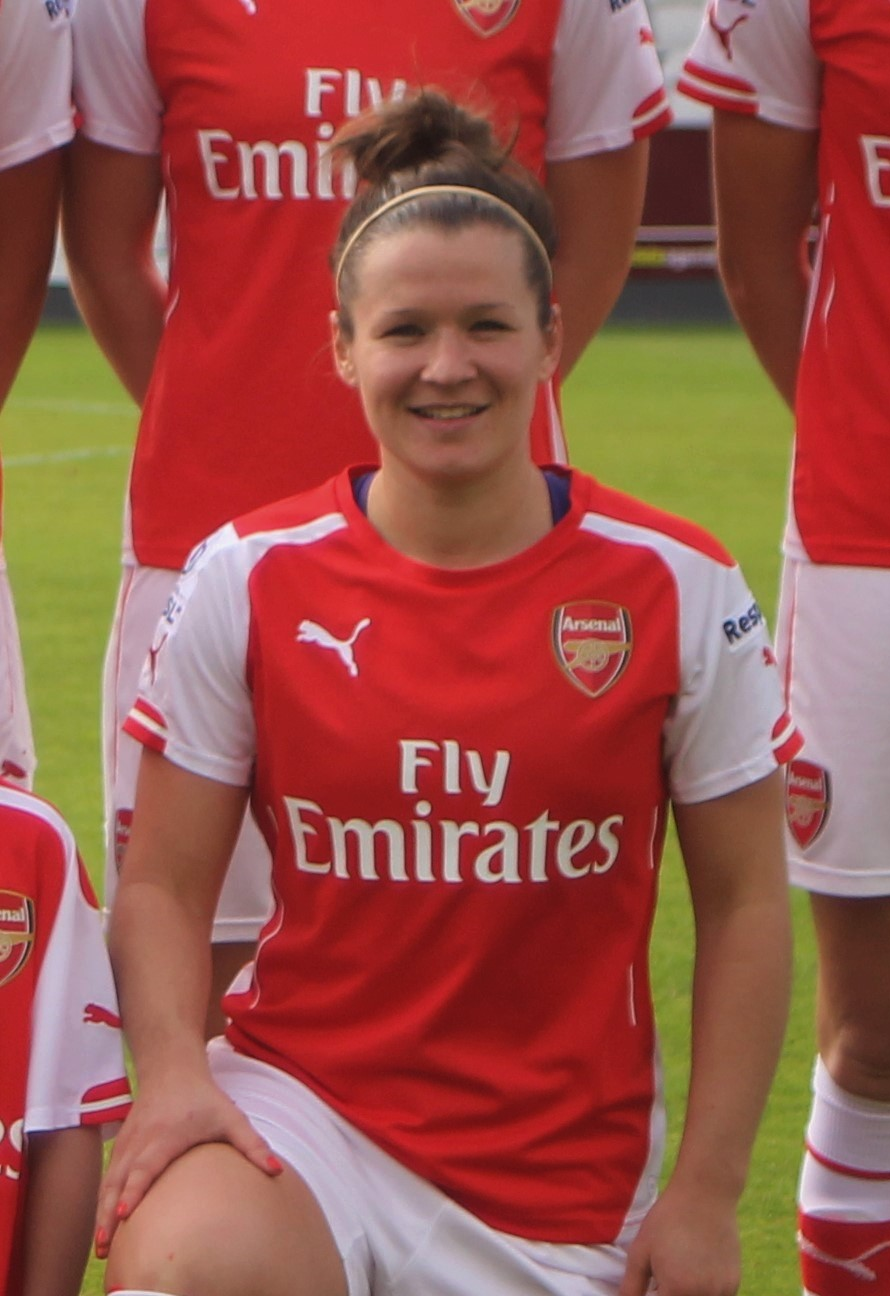
(Scotland) Emma Mukandi

- Lisa Evans – Turbine Potsdam, Bayern Munich – 2012–2017
- Nicky Grant – 1. FFC Frankfurt – 2003–2004
- Sophie Howard – TSG Hoffenheim – 2015–2018
- Sam Kerr – Bayern Munich – 2023–2025
- Kathleen McGovern – SC Sand – 2021–2022
- Emma Mukandi (née Mitchell) – SGS Essen – 2012–2013

=== Serbia ===
- Dina Blagojević – SC Sand, Bayer Leverkusen – 2017–2023
- **Jovana Damnjanović** – VfL Wolfsburg, SC Sand, Bayern Munich – 2013–
- Marija Ilić – MSV Duisburg – 2022–2023
- Mina Matijevic - FFC Frankfurt - 2026

=== Slovakia ===
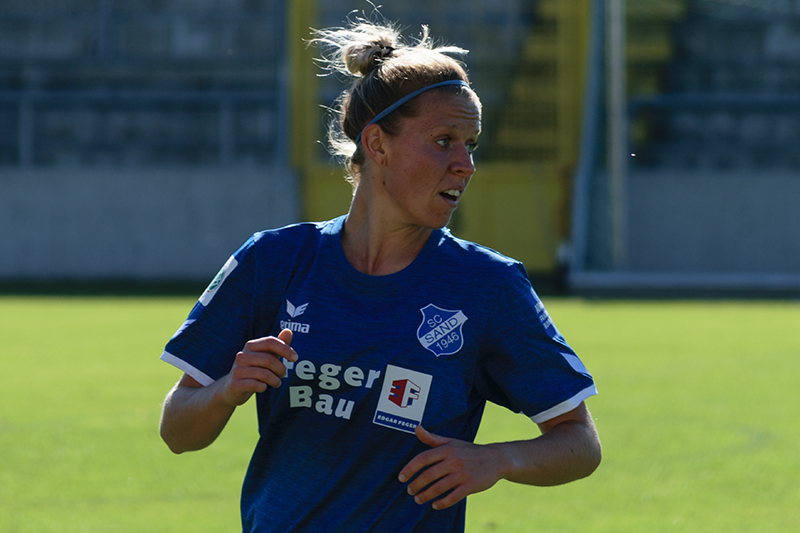
(Slovakia) Jana Vojteková

- Lucia Haršányová – MSV Duisburg – 2017–2021
- Mária Korenčiová – SC Sand, SC Freiburg – 2014–2016, 2017–2018
- Mária Mikolajová – Hamburger SV – 2025–2026
- Lucia Ondrušová – 1. FC Köln – 2019–2020
- Dominika Škorvánková – SC Sand, Bayern Munich – 2015–2020
- **Jana Vojteková** – SC Sand, SC Freiburg – 2019–2023, 2026–

=== Slovenia ===
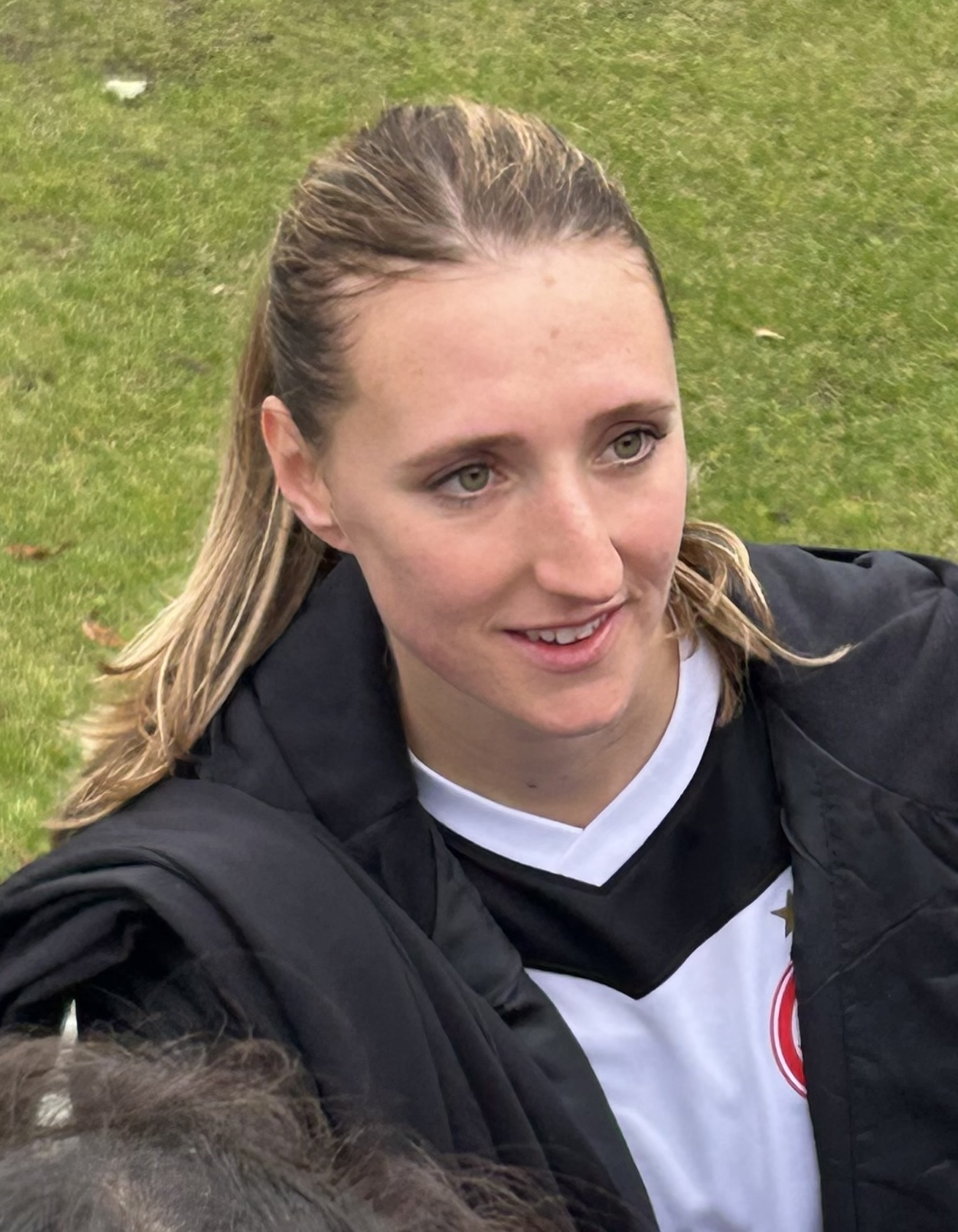
(Slovenia) Lara Prašnikar has played over 160 matches in the Bundesliga since 2016.

- Sara Agrež – Turbine Potsdam, VfL Wolfsburg, 1. FC Köln – 2019–2026
- **Korina Janež** – RB Leipzig, Union Berlin – 2023–2024, 2025–
- Zala Meršnik – Turbine Potsdam – 2019–2022
- Adrijana Mori – Turbine Potsdam, Carl Zeiss Jena – 2020–2025
- **Lara Prašnikar** – Turbine Potsdam, Eintracht Frankfurt, VfL Wolfsburg – 2016–2025, 2026–
- Fata Salkunič – Hamburger SV, FF USV Jena – 2009–2010, 2011–2012
- **Maja Sternad** – Werder Bremen, Bayer Leverkusen – 2021–

=== Spain ===
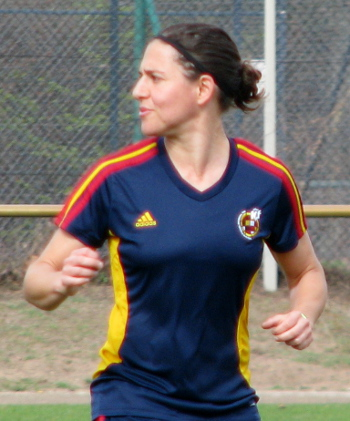
(Spain) Verónica Boquete

- Ainhoa Alguacil – Eintracht Frankfurt – 2025–
- Verónica Boquete – 1. FFC Frankfurt, Bayern Munich – 2014–2016
- Marta Cazalla – TSG Hoffenheim – 2024–2025
- **Edna Imade** – Bayern Munich – 2025–
- **Laia Martret** – TSG Hoffenheim – 2026–
- Ana Munoz Perez – Bayern Munich – 1990–1991
- Silvia Parra Labalsa – Bayern Munich – 2003–2004
- **Judit Pujols** – VfL Wolfsburg – 2025–
- Nuria Rábano – VfL Wolfsburg – 2023–2025
- Laura del Río – 1. FFC Frankfurt – 2009–2010

=== Sweden ===
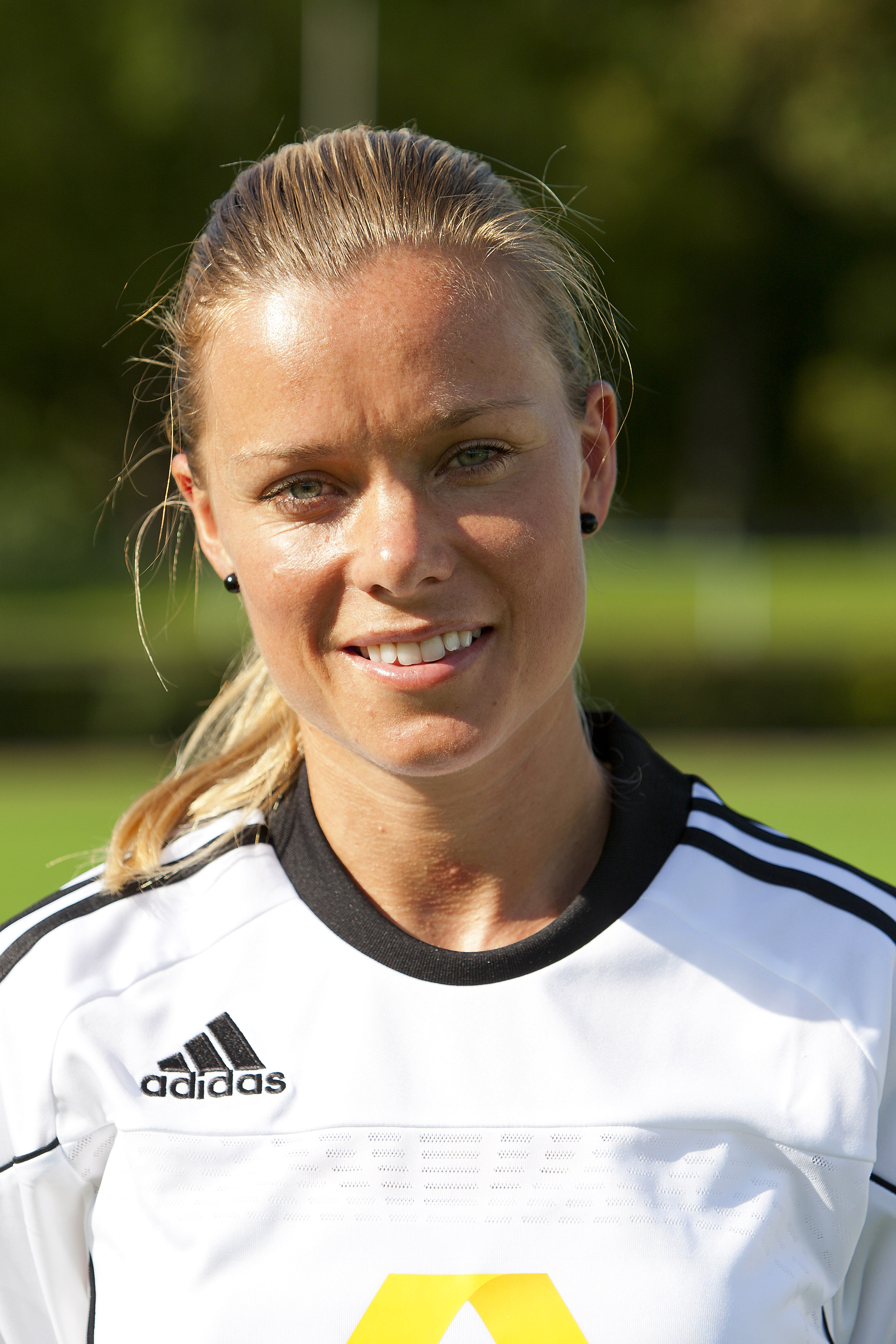
Sara Thunebro

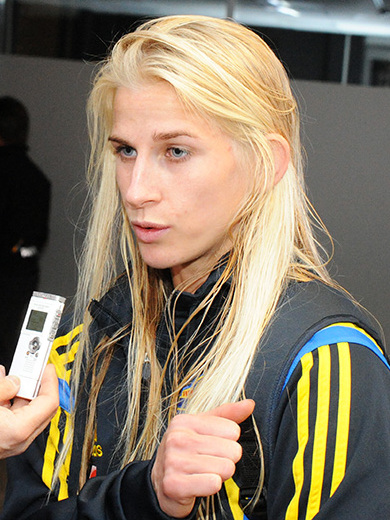
(Sweden) Sofia Jakobsson

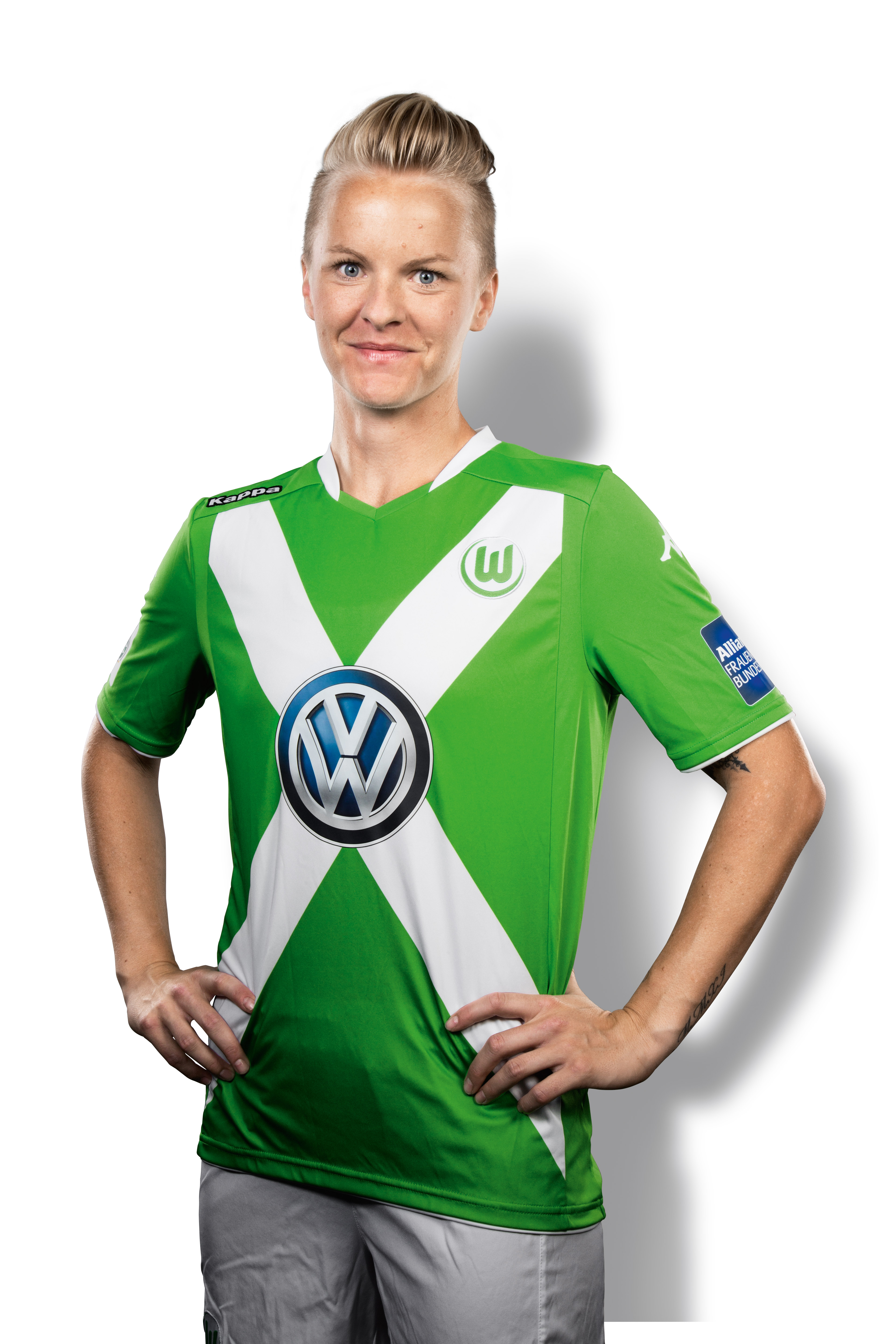
(Sweden) Nilla Fischer

- Olivia Alcaide – Carl Zeiss Jena – 2025–2026
- **Hanna Bennison** – Eintracht Frankfurt – 2026–
- **Rebecka Blomqvist** – VfL Wolfsburg, Eintracht Frankfurt – 2021–
- **Magdalena Eriksson** – Bayern Munich – 2023–
- Nilla Fischer – VfL Wolfsburg – 2013–2019
- Hanna Glas – Bayern Munich – 2020–2022
- Antonia Göransson – Hamburger SV, Turbine Potsdam, Bayer Leverkusen – 2011–2014, 2019–2020
- **Amanda Ilestedt** – Turbine Potsdam, Bayern Munich, Eintracht Frankfurt– 2017–2021, 2025–
- Sofia Jakobsson – BV Cloppenburg, Bayern Munich – 2013–2014, 2021–2022
- Jessica Landström – 1. FFC Frankfurt – 2010–2012
- Emma Lind – Turbine Potsdam – 2020–2021
- Hedvig Lindahl – VfL Wolfsburg – 2019–2020
- Fridolina Rolfö – Bayern Munich, VfL Wolfsburg – 2016–2021
- Olivia Schough – Bayern Munich – 2013–2014
- Linda Sembrant – Bayern Munich – 2023–2025
- Klara Svensson Senelius – 1. FC Nürnberg – 2025–2026
- Sara Thunebro – 1. FFC Frankfurt – 2009–2013
- Mimmi Wahlström (née Larsson) – RB Leipzig – 2023–2024
- Julia Zigiotti Olme – Bayern Munich – 2024–2025

=== Switzerland ===
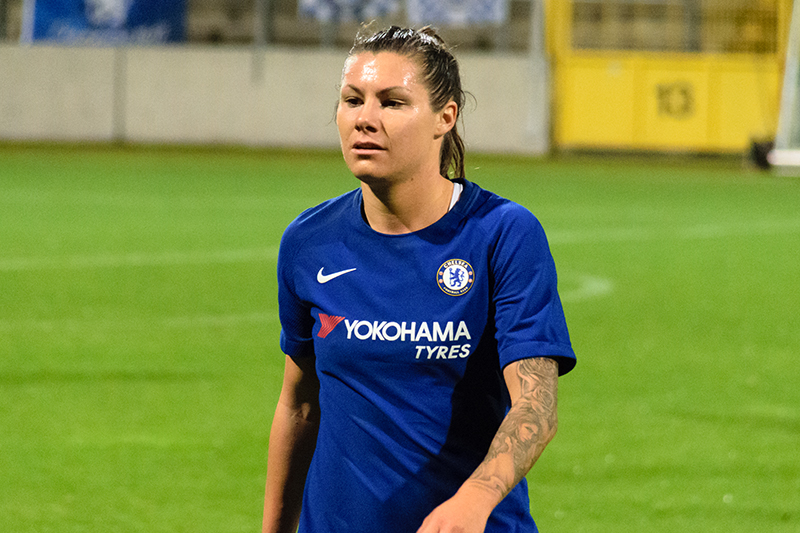
(Switzerland) Ramona Bachmann

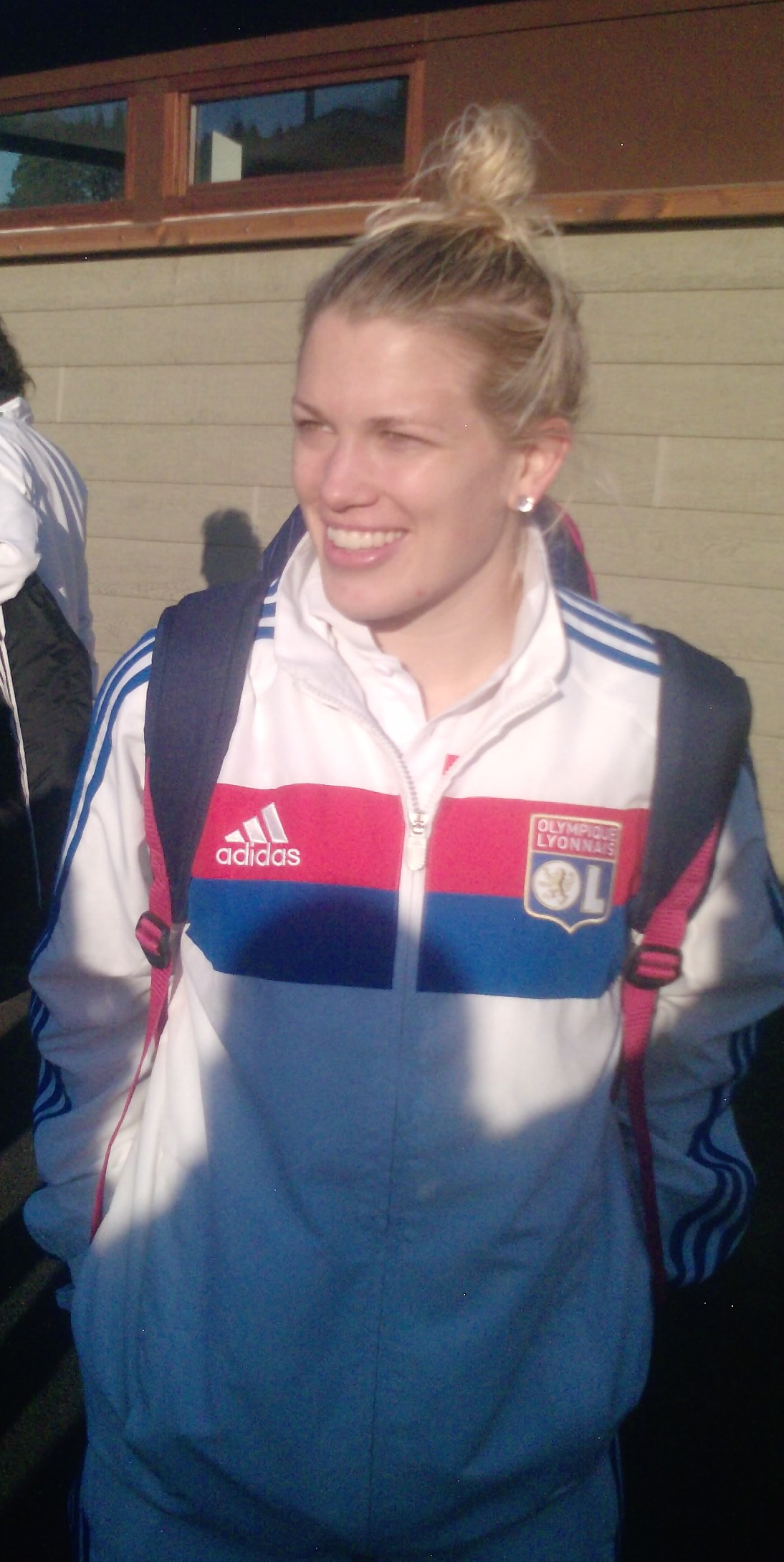
(Switzerland) Lara Dickenmann

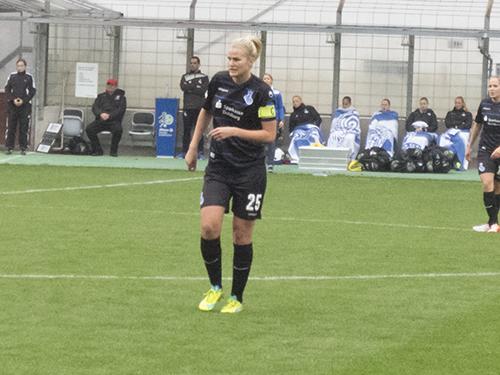
(Switzerland) Rahel Kiwic

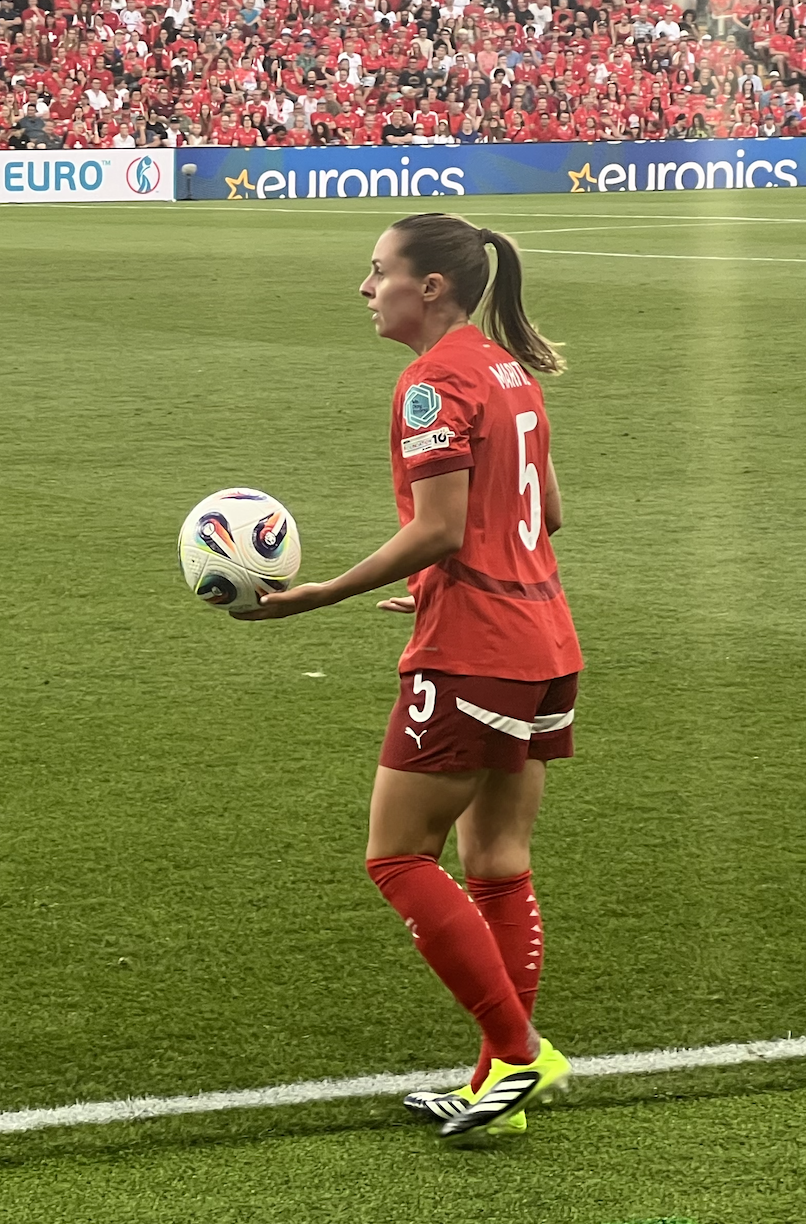
(Switzerland) Noelle Maritz

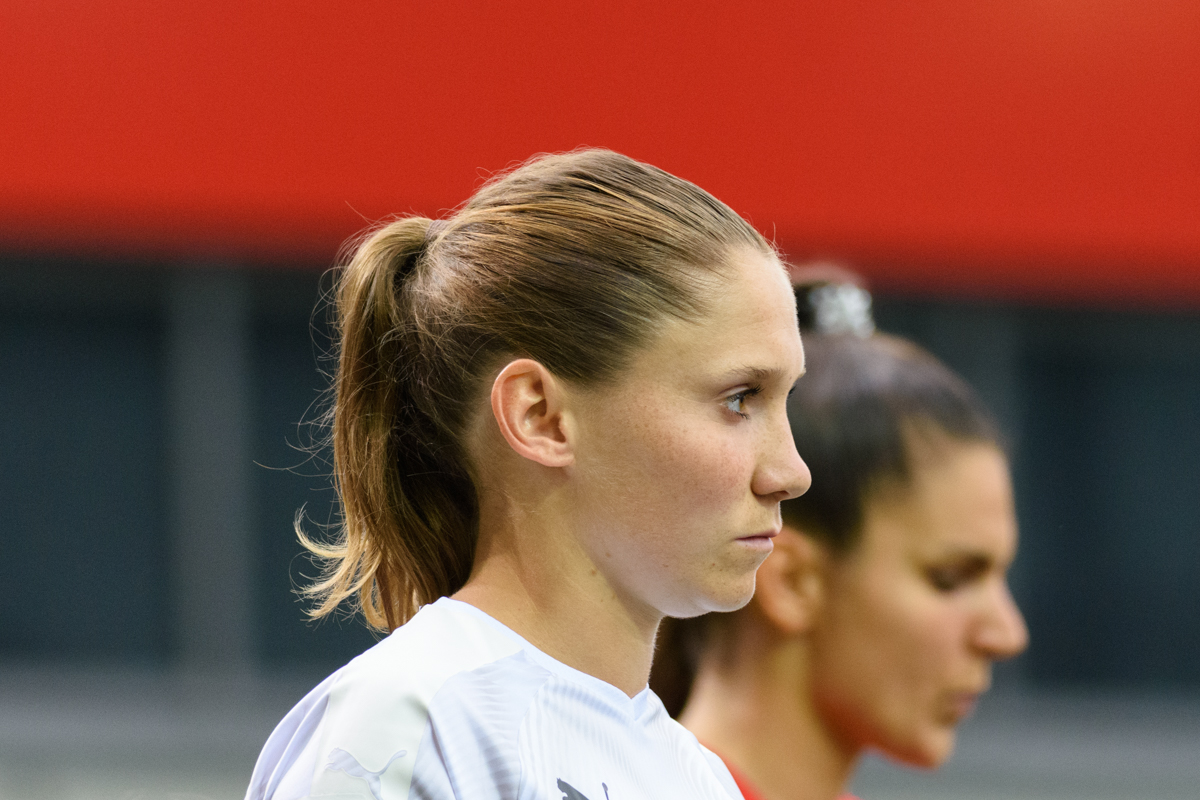
(Switzerland) Sandrine Mauron

- Caroline Abbé – SC Freiburg, Bayern Munich – 2011–2017
- Eseosa Aigbogun – Turbine Potsdam – 2016–2018
- **Lydia Andrade** – SV Meppen, RB Leipzig, 1. FC Köln – 2022–
- **Amira Arfaoui** – Bayer Leverkusen, 1. FC Nürnberg, Werder Bremen, SC Freiburg – 2021–
- Ramona Bachmann – VfL Wolfsburg – 2015–2017
- Fabienne Bangerter – SC Freiburg – 2014–2015
- Noémie Beney – 1. FC Saarbrücken – 2009–2011
- Vanessa Bernauer – BV Cloppenburg, VfL Wolfsburg – 2013–2018
- Sandra Betschart – VfL Sindelfingen, MSV Duisburg – 2012–2013, 2016–2017
- **Alena Bienz** – 1. FC Köln, SC Freiburg – 2022–
- **Nadine Böhi** – Union Berlin – 2025–
- Marisa Brunner – SC Freiburg – 2009–2010, 2011–2012
- Luana Bühler – TSG Hoffenheim – 2018–2023
- Vanessa Bürki – Bayern Munich – 2008–2017
- Tyara Buser – SC Freiburg – 2020–2022
- Francesca Horvat-Calò (née Calò) – Werder Bremen, 1. FC Köln – 2018–2022
- Ana-Maria Crnogorčević – Hamburger SV, 1. FFC Frankfurt – 2009–2018
- Aurélie Csillag – SC Freiburg – 2025–2026
- Sandra de Pol – TuS Niederkirchen, Bayern Munich – 1998–2013
- Monica Di Fonzo – SC Freiburg – 2003–2004
- Lara Dickenmann – VfL Wolfsburg – 2015–2021
- **Leela Egli** – SC Freiburg, Union Berlin – 2023–
- **Svenja Fölmli** – SC Freiburg, TSG Hoffenheim – 2021–
- Irina Fuchs – 1. FC Köln – 2025–
- Nadia Gäggeler – FCR 2001 Duisburg, SGS Essen – 2001–2003, 2004–2006
- Rahel Graf – SC Freiburg – 2007–2008
- Sarina Heeb – MSV Duisburg – 2022–2023
- **Elvira Herzog** – 1. FC Köln, SC Freiburg, RB Leipzig – 2019–
- **Noemi Ivelj** – Eintracht Frankfurt – 2025–
- **Sabina Jackson** – Mainz 05 – 2026–
- Sandra Kälin – TuS Niederkirchen – 1993–2003
- **Lia Kamber** – Union Berlin – 2025–
- Lara Keller – FSV Gütersloh 2009, FF USV Jena – 2013–2015
- Rahel Kiwic – MSV Duisburg, Turbine Potsdam – 2014–2020
- Kathrin Lehmann – TuS Niederkirchen, Turbine Potsdam, Bayern Munich, FCR 2001 Duisburg – 1999–2003, 2008–2011
- Gabriele Leuenberger – TuS Niederkirchen – 2002–2003
- Flavia Lüscher – Turbine Potsdam – 2024–2025
- **Naomi Luyet** – TSG Hoffenheim – 2025–
- Noelle Maritz – VfL Wolfsburg – 2013–2020
- **Lara Marti** – Bayer Leverkusen, RB Leipzig – 2020–
- Sandrine Mauron (née Gaillard) – Eintracht Frankfurt – 2019–2022
- Naomi Mégroz – SC Freiburg – 2019–2021
- **Lara Meroni** – 1. FC Nürnberg – 2025–
- Isabelle Meyer – SC Freiburg, SC Sand – 2011–2012, 2014–2019
- Stenia Michel – FF USV Jena – 2013–2016
- Martina Moser – SC Freiburg, VfL Wolfsburg, TSG Hoffenheim – 2007–2012, 2013–2017
- Elena Mühlemann – 1. FC Nürnberg, Carl Zeiss Jena – 2023–2024, 2025–
- Anna Müller – SC Freiburg, SC Sand – 2003–2005
- Irina Pando – Bayer Leverkusen – 2021–2022
- Livia Peng – SV Werder Bremen – 2023–2025
- **Emanuela Pfister** – RB Leipzig – 2026–
- Silia Plöchinger – Turbine Potsdam – 2024–2025
- Carmen Pulver – MSV Duisburg – 2014–2015
- Géraldine Reuteler – Eintracht Frankfurt – 2018–2026
- Nadine Riesen – Eintracht Frankfurt – 2023–2026
- Rachel Rinast – SC 07 Bad Neuenahr, 1. FC Köln, Bayer Leverkusen, SC Freiburg – 2012–2013, 2015–2017, 2018–2022
- **Lourdes Romero** – 1. FC Nürnberg – 2025–
- Mia Schmid – Turbine Potsdam – 2024–2025
- Danique Stein – SC Freiburg, SC 07 Bad Neuenahr – 2009–2011
- **Julia Stierli** – SC Freiburg – 2024–
- Gaëlle Thalmann – Turbine Potsdam, Hamburger SV, Lokomotive Leipzig, MSV Duisburg – 2007–2008, 2009–2010, 2011–2012, 2014–2015
- Ella Touon – SGS Essen, 1. FC Köln – 2020–2023, 2025–2026
- **Smilla Vallotto** – VfL Wolfsburg – 2025–
- Lia Wälti – Turbine Potsdam – 2013–2018
- Marilena Widmer – 1. FFC Frankfurt – 2018–2019
- Sabina Wölbitsch – TuS Niederkirchen, FSV Frankfurt – 1992–1994, 1995–2000
- Riola Xhemaili – SC Freiburg, VfL Wolfsburg – 2021–2024
- Cinzia Zehnder – SC Freiburg – 2015–2017

=== Turkey ===
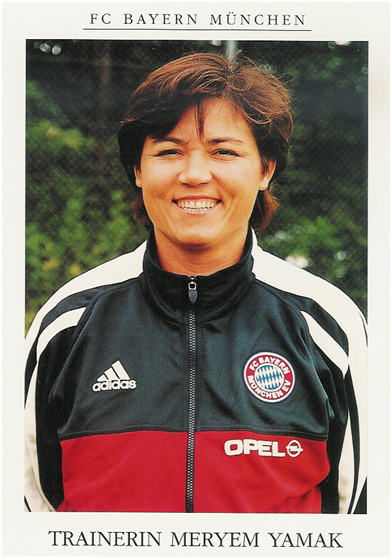
(Turkey) Meryem Yamak

- Sinem Özdemir - Werder Bremen - 2025-
- Aysun Ada – TuS Niederkirchen, TuS Wörrstadt – 1994–1998, 2002–2003
- Döndü Aldirmaz – SC Klinge Seckach, TuS Niederkirchen – 1997–2000
- Feride Bakır – SC 07 Bad Neuenahr, Bayer Leverkusen – 2008–2013
- Gamze Baykal – FSV Frankfurt – 2003–2004
- Gülcay Bükrü – FCR 2001 Duisburg – 1998–2002
- Miray Cin – MSV Duisburg, SC Freiburg – 2020–2025
- Sana Coşkun – Bayer Leverkusen – 2025–
- Ecem Cümert – MSV Duisburg – 2020–2021
- Bilgin Defterli – FSV Frankfurt, FFC Brauweiler Pulheim – 2004–2006
- Suheila Dikmen – SC Klinge Seckach, TuS Niederkirchen – 1994–1998
- Jennifer Düner – FFC Flaesheim-Hillen, Heike Rheine, SG Wattenscheid 09 – 1999–2004, 2007–2008
- Esma Gado – FSV Frankfurt – 2005–2006
- İlayda İçier – MSV Duisburg – 2023–2024
- Helga Nadire İnan Ertürk – FCR 2001 Duisburg, SG Wattenscheid 09 – 2003–2004, 2007–2008
- Arzu Karabulut – Bayer Leverkusen – 2011–2012
- Vildan Kardeşler – SV Meppen, Hamburger SV – 2022–2023, 2025–2026
- Ayşe Kuru – FCR Duisburg 55 – 2000–2001
- Melike Pekel – Bayern Munich – 2014–2017
- Fatma Şakar – SC Sand, RB Leipzig, Union Berlin – 2020–2022, 2023–2024, 2025–
- Arzu Teke – SC 07 Bad Neuenahr – 2001–2003
- Deniz Teodonno – FSV Frankfurt, VfL Wolfsburg, SG Wattenscheid 09, SGS Essen – 2005–2011
- Mehtap Topac – FCR Duisburg 55 – 2002–2003
- Meryem Yamak – Bayern Munich, Wacker München – 1990–1991, 1992–1993
- Aylin Yaren – Tennis Borussia Berlin, Hamburger SV, SC 07 Bad Neuenahr, BV Cloppenburg – 2009–2010, 2011–2014

=== Ukraine ===
- Anna Kostraba – SC Klinge Seckach – 1997–1998
- Natalia Malyga – 1. FC Nürnberg – 1999–2000
- Nadia Mischenko – 1. FC Nürnberg – 1999–2000
- Svitlana Stasyuk – Heike Rheine – 2000–2001
- Tetyana Verezubova – SC Klinge Seckach – 1997–1998

=== Wales ===
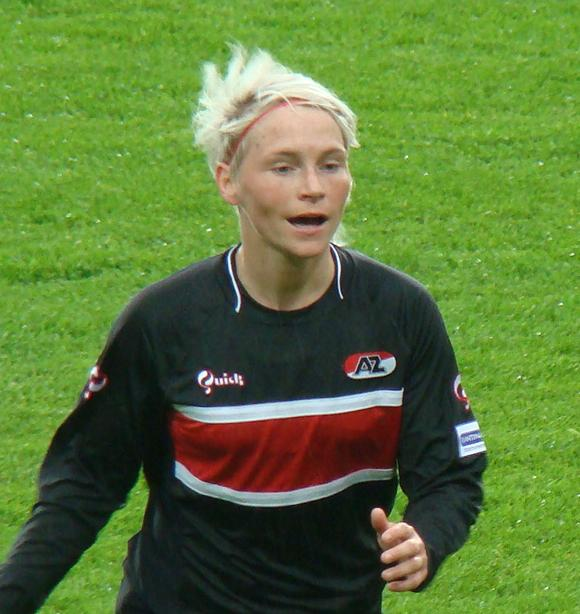
(Wales) Jess Fishlock

- Jess Fishlock – 1. FFC Frankfurt – 2014–2015

== North and Central America, Caribbean (CONCACAF) ==
=== Canada ===
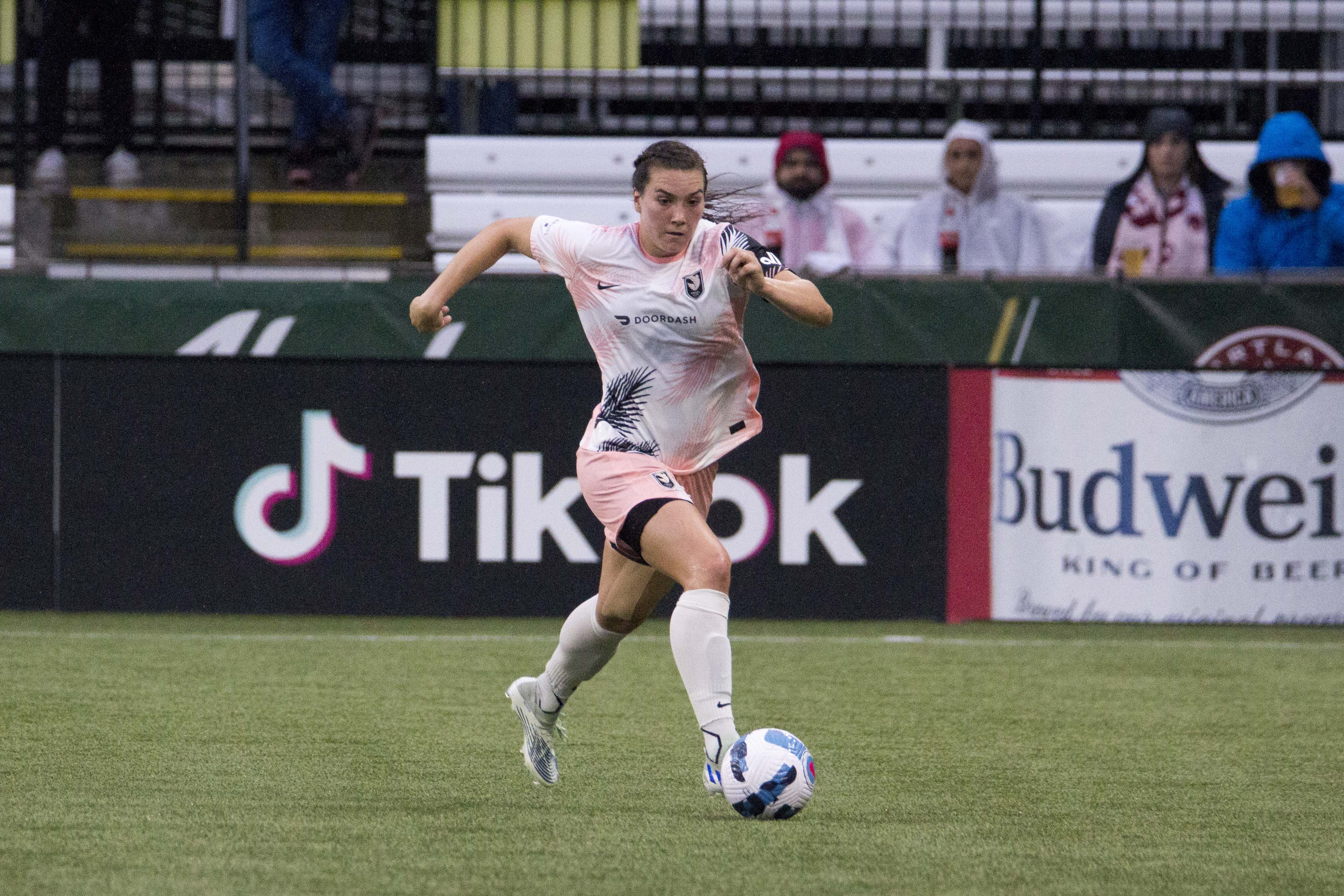
(Canada) Vanessa Gilles

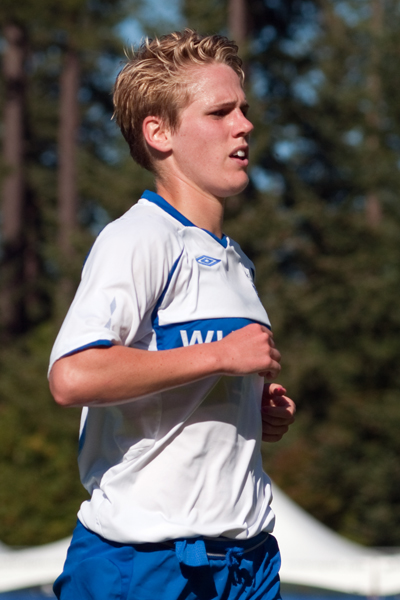
(Canada) Sophie Schmidt

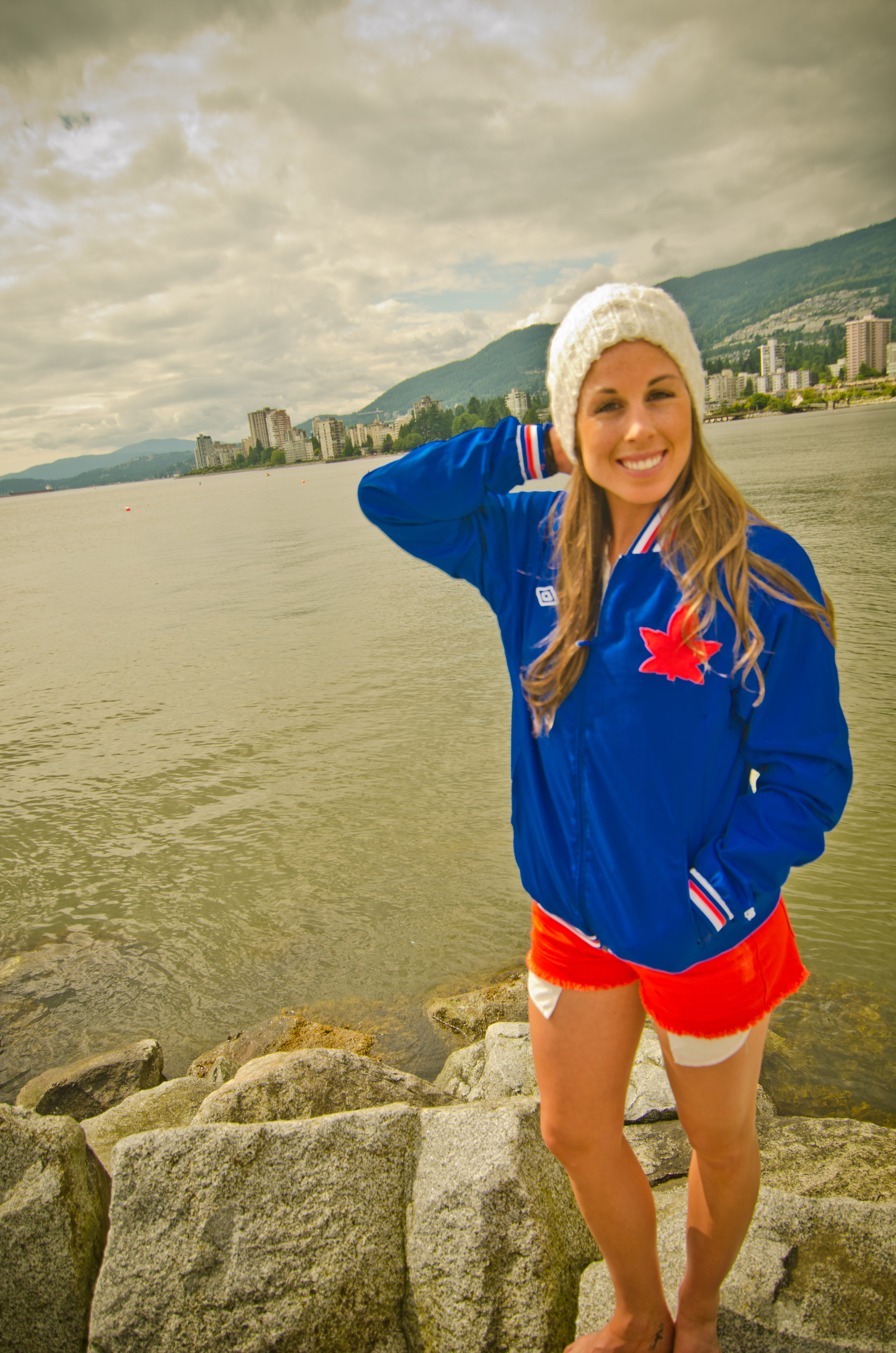
(Canada) Emily Zurrer

- Paige Culver – Turbine Potsdam – 2022–2023
- Jessica De Filippo – Turbine Potsdam – 2022–2023
- Emilie Fillion – MSV Duisburg – 2014–2015
- Tanya Franck – Heike Rheine – 1998–1999
- **Vanessa Gilles** – Bayern Munich – 2025–
- Janine Helland (née Wood) – Grün-Weiß Brauweiler – 1997–1998
- Christina Julien – FF USV Jena, 1. FC Köln – 2013–2016
- Julie Karn – FF USV Jena – 2019–2020
- **Caroline Kehrer** – Bayer Leverkusen – 2024–
- Gabrielle Lambert – SC Freiburg – 2022–2024
- Bryanna McCarthy – SC Sand – 2014–2015
- Ashley McGhee – SC Freiburg – 2006–2007
- Erin McLeod – FF USV Jena – 2017–2018
- Rachel Melhado – Herforder SV, FF USV Jena – 2014–2017
- Kelly Parker – SC Freiburg – 2009–2010
- Amelia Pietrangelo – FF USV Jena – 2017–2018
- Kim Rogers – Bayern Munich – 2003–2006
- Sophie Schmidt – 1. FFC Frankfurt – 2015–2018
- Liz Smith – Heike Rheine – 1998–1999
- Chelsea Stewart – SC Freiburg – 2016–2017
- **Mattson Strickler** – Mainz 05 – 2026–
- Myia Wilkes – MSV Duisburg – 2018–2019
- Shannon Woeller – FF USV Jena – 2016–2018
- Danica Wu – Herforder SV, MSV Duisburg, SGS Essen – 2014–2015, 2016–2020
- Sura Yekka – MSV Duisburg – 2020–2021
- Emily Zurrer – SGS Essen – 2009–2010

=== Curaçao ===
- Jeleaugh Rosa – MSV Duisburg – 2023–2024
- **Celainy Obispo** – Hamburger SV – 2026–

=== Jamaica ===
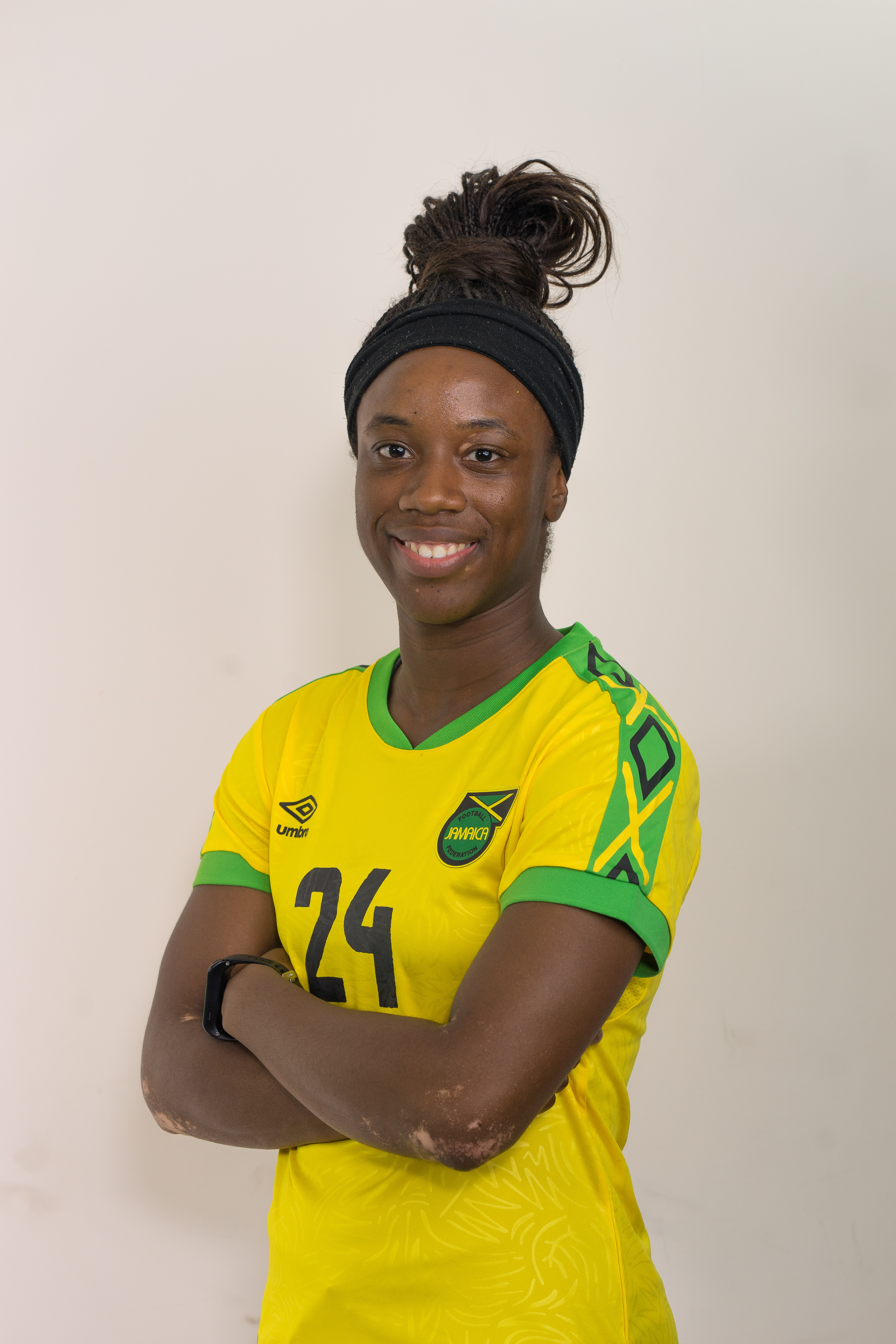
Tiffany Cameron in 2019

- Tiffany Cameron – TSG Hoffenheim, Borussia Mönchengladbach, FF USV Jena – 2013–2014, 2016–2018

=== Mexico ===
- Alina Garciamendez – 1. FFC Frankfurt – 2013–2014

=== Puerto Rico ===
- Jackie Cruz – FF USV Jena – 2011–2015
- Esmeralda Negron – FFC Brauweiler Pulheim – 2006–2007

=== Saint Kitts and Nevis ===
- Phoenetia Browne – SC Sand – 2020–2022

=== Suriname ===
- Jenske Steenwijk – SV Meppen – 2022–2023

=== United States ===
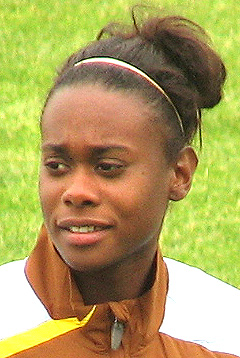
(United States) India Trotter

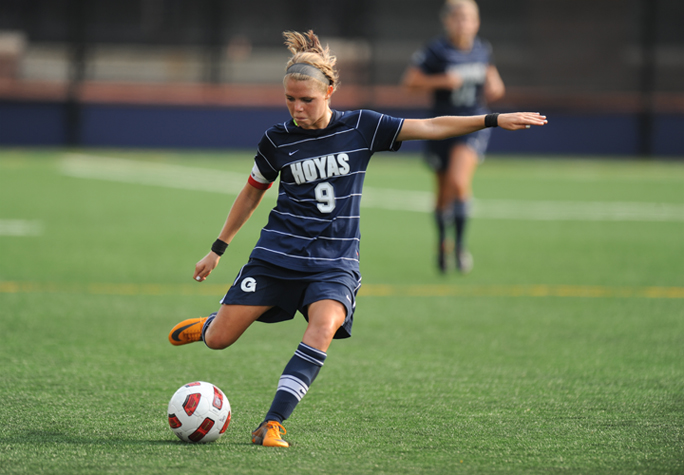
(United States) Ingrid Wells

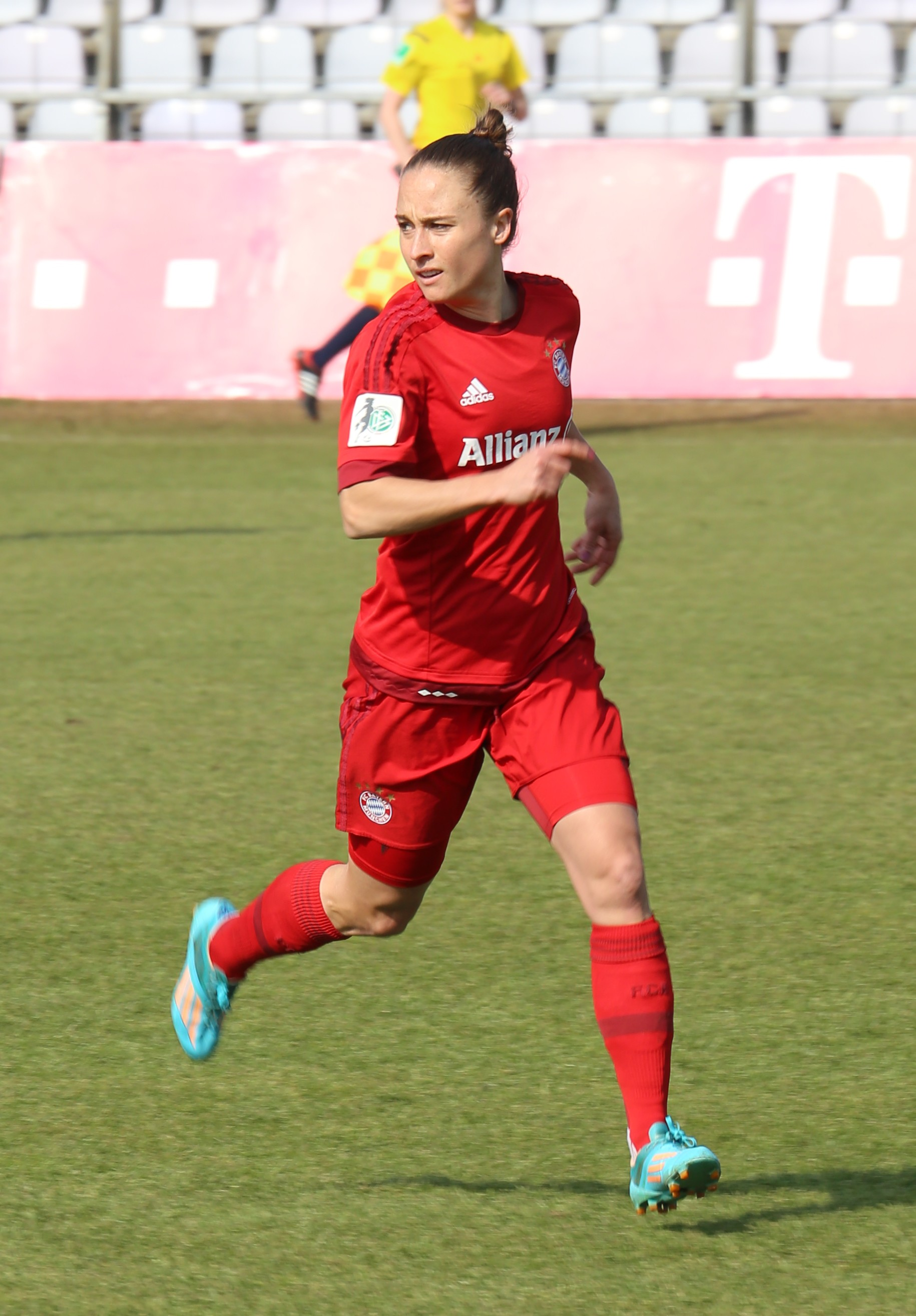
(United States) Gina Lewandowski made 199 appearances in twelve Bundesliga seasons and won three championships with 1. FFC Frankfurt and Bayern Munich.

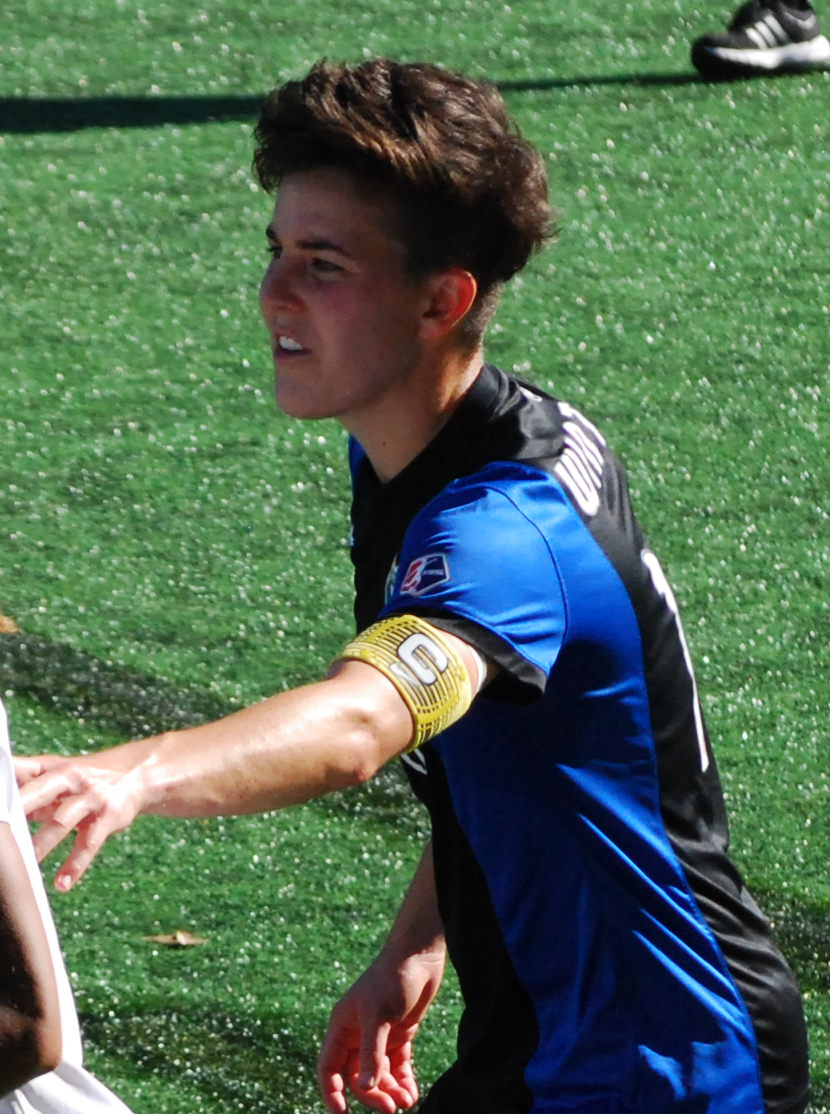
(United States) Keelin Winters

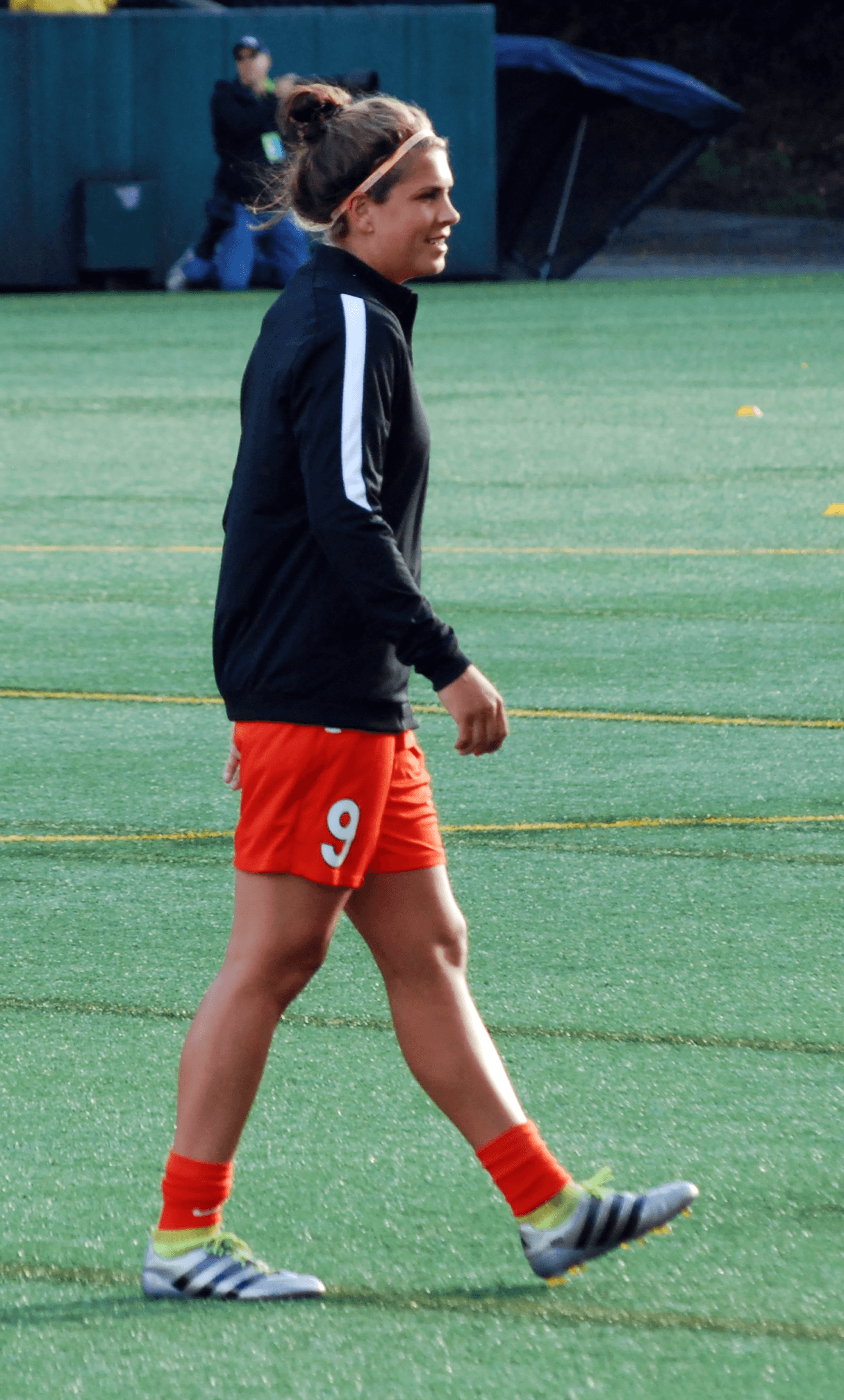
(United States) Sarah Hagen

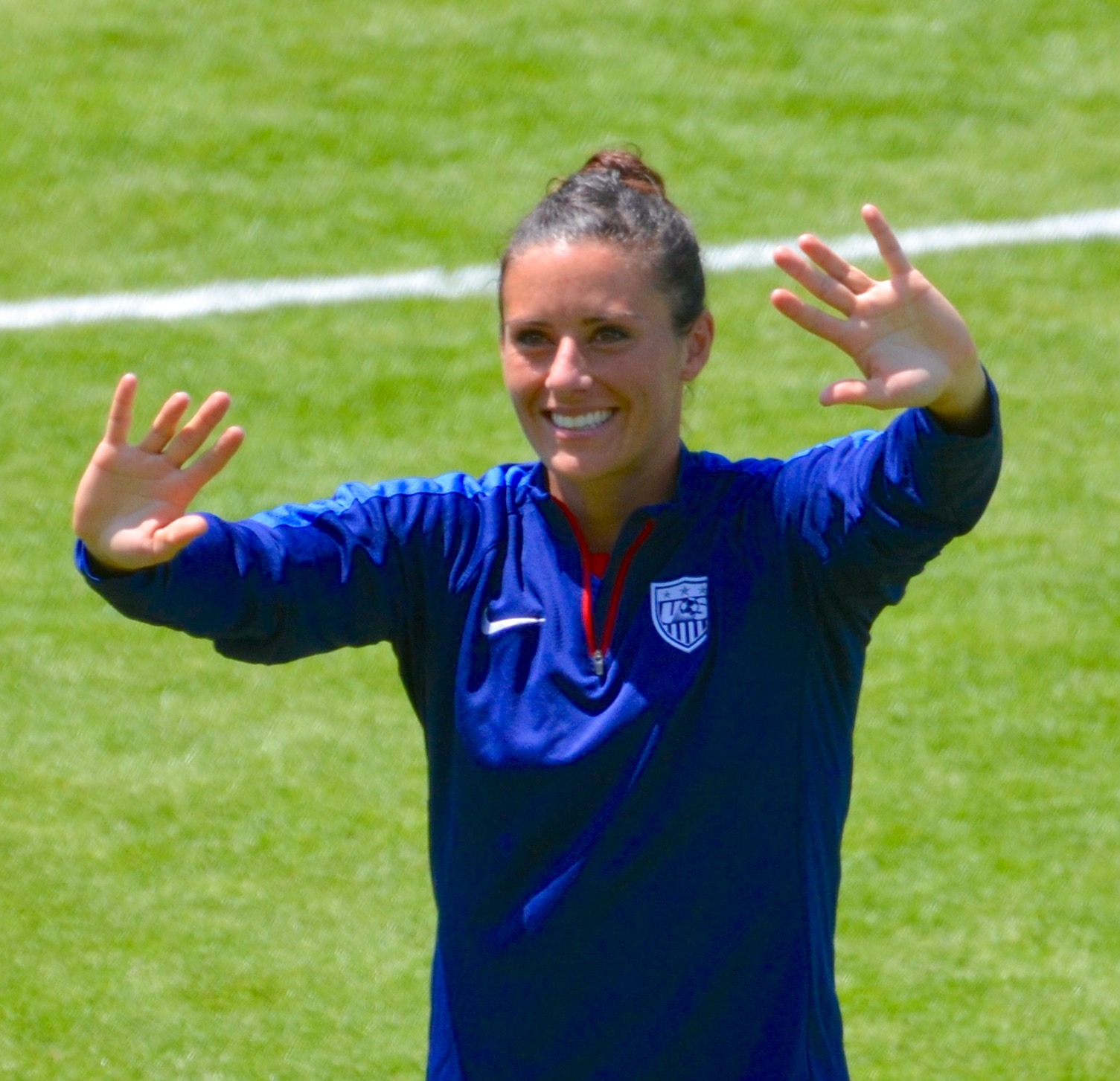
(United States) Ali Krieger

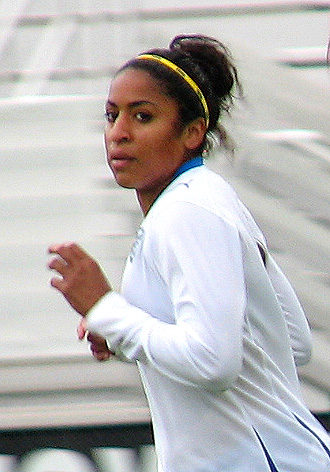
(United States) Chioma Igwe

- Julie Augustyniak – Turbine Potsdam – 2003–2004
- Nancy Augustyniak Goffi (née Augustyniak) – Turbine Potsdam, VfL Wolfsburg – 2003–2005
- Jorian Baucom – MSV Duisburg – 2020–2021
- Tari Beck – FSV Frankfurt – 1999–2000
- Alison Benoit – WSV Wolfsburg-Wendschott – 2001–2003
- Katie Bethke – Bayer Leverkusen – 2011–2012
- Shannon Boxx Spearman (née Boxx) – 1. FC Saarbrücken – 1999–2000
- Vicky Bruce – SC Sand – 2021–2022
- Natalie Budge – 1. FC Saarbrücken – 2007–2008
- Elli Burris (née Reed) – FCR 2001 Duisburg – 2012–2013
- Jennie Clark – Lokomotive Leipzig, SC Freiburg, 1. FFC Frankfurt – 2011–2016
- Kelli Conkrite – 1. FC Saarbrücken – 2007–2008, 2009–2010
- Niki Cross – Bayern Munich – 2011–2014
- Genessee Daughetee Puntigam (née Daughetee) – 1. FC Köln – 2022–2023
- Carlie Davis – Herforder SV – 2014–2015
- Tracey Deeter – Hamburger SV – 2001–2002
- Kate Deines – Turbine Potsdam – 2014–2015
- Michelle Demko – SC Klinge Seckach, FSV Frankfurt – 1996–1999
- Brooke Denesik – MSV Duisburg – 2022-2023
- Sammy Durkin (née Jerabek) – MSV Duisburg – 2023-2024
- Jeanette Dyer – TSV Crailsheim – 2008–2009
- Juliana Edwards – 1. FC Saarbrücken – 2009–2011
- Tara Erickson – FSV Frankfurt – 1999–2000
- Christy Rowe Estlund (née Rowe) – 1. FFC 08 Niederkirchen, 1. FC Saarbrücken – 1998–2001
- Claire Falknor – Bayern Munich – 2015–2016
- Amanda Feigt – Tennis Borussia Berlin – 2009–2010
- Jannelle Flaws – SV Meppen – 2020–2021
- Taylor Flint (née Kornieck) – MSV Duisburg – 2020–2021
- Mele French – SC Freiburg – 2009–2010
- Aleigh Gambone – 1. FC Nürnberg – 2025–2026
- Lindsay Greco – VfL Wolfsburg – 2004–2005
- Summer Green – SC Sand – 2020–2022
- Ashley Grove – Herforder SV – 2014–2015
- Sarah Hagen – Bayern Munich – 2011–2014
- Megan Hanushek – Grün-Weiß Brauweiler – 1992–1995
- Zoe Hasenauer – 1. FC Köln – 2025–2026
- Ashlyn Harris – FCR 2001 Duisburg – 2012–2013
- Mary Harvey – FSV Frankfurt – 1990–1991, 1992–1993
- Lydia Hastings – Herforder SV – 2014–2015
- Tamera Hatfield – TuS Niederkirchen – 1993–1996
- Bryane Heaberlin – Turbine Potsdam, 1. FFC Frankfurt – 2015–2016, 2017–2020
- Allie Hess – MSV Duisburg – 2022–2024
- Vanessa Hunter – 1. FC Saarbrücken – 2000–2001
- Chioma Igwe – SC Freiburg, SC Sand – 2011–2017
- Marci Jobson (née Miller) – Turbine Potsdam – 1999–2000
- Adrienne Jordan – SC Sand, Turbine Potsdam – 2020–2023
- Cindy Kappes – SC Klinge Seckach, FSV Frankfurt – 1997–1999
- Annie Karich – SC Freiburg – 2023–2025
- Diane Kazer – Hamburger SV – 2001–2002
- Hannah Keane – FF USV Jena – 2017–2018
- Katie Kelly – Lokomotive Leipzig – 2011–2012
- Tara Koleski – 1. FC Saarbrücken – 1999–2000
- Ali Krieger - 1. FFC Frankfurt – 2007–2013
- Lisa Krzykowski (Lisa Cantrell) – Turbine Potsdam – 1999–2000
- Ashley Leonhart – MSV Duisburg – 2022–2023
- Gina Lewandowski – 1. FFC Frankfurt, Bayern Munich – 2007–2019
- Mallori Lofton-Malachi – SC Sand – 2014–2015
- Michelle Lomnicki (née Wenino) – SC Freiburg – 2009–2010
- Natalia Mann – VfL Sindelfingen, SGS Essen – 2012–2013, 2013–2014
- Jennifer Martin – FF USV Jena – 2015–2016
- Ella Masar (formerly Masar McLeod) – VfL Wolfsburg – 2017–2019
- Jessica McDonald – Herforder SV – 2014–2015
- Wynne McIntosh – FSV Frankfurt – 1998–1999
- Ursula McKnight – Fortuna Sachsenross, FCR Duisburg 55 – 1996–1999
- Rachel Mercik – Turbine Potsdam – 2014–2015
- Kristie Mewis – Bayern Munich – 2015–2016
- Natalie Muth – MSV Duisburg – 2023–2024
- Alyssa Naeher – Turbine Potsdam – 2011–2013
- Meaghan Nally – Turbine Potsdam – 2020–2021
- Carolyn Nason – TSV Crailsheim – 2008–2009
- Sara Overgaag – FSV Frankfurt – 1999–2000
- Kaitlyn Parcell – MSV Duisburg – 2022–2024
- Holly Pierce – FSV Frankfurt – 1998–1999
- Darya Rajaee – Turbine Potsdam – 2022–2023
- Katherine Reynolds – SC Freiburg – 2012–2013
- Taryn Ries – MSV Duisburg – 2023–2024
- Kaylie Ronan – Werder Bremen – 2024–2026
- Jill Rutten – SC Klinge Seckach – 1996–1997
- Melanie Schneider – FFC Brauweiler Pulheim – 2006–2007
- Sara Sedgwick – FFC Brauweiler Pulheim – 2006–2007
- Anna Sieloff – BV Cloppenburg – 2013–2014
- Leah Sims – FFC Brauweiler Pulheim – 2005–2006
- Alex Singer – Turbine Potsdam – 2011–2014
- Kimberly Smith – 1. FC Saarbrücken – 1999–2000
- Jaime Souza – VfL Wolfsburg – 2010–2011
- Katie Stengel – Bayern Munich – 2014–2016
- Libby Stout – BV Cloppenburg – 2013–2014
- Sara Streufert – VfL Wolfsburg – 2002–2004
- Colleen Sullivan – FSV Frankfurt – 2003–2004
- Danielle Sweeney – 1. FC Saarbrücken – 2010–2011
- Katarina Tarr – Tennis Borussia Berlin, SGS Essen – 2009–2013
- Meredith Teague – 1. FC Saarbrücken – 2009–2010
- Alena Thom – SC Freiburg – 2004–2006
- Haley Thomas – MSV Duisburg – 2023–2024
- Melinda Torre – 1. FC Saarbrücken – 1998–2002
- India Trotter – 1. FFC Frankfurt – 2008–2009
- Erika Tymrak – Bayern Munich – 2013–2014
- Michelle Voiland – 1. FC Saarbrücken – 1998–2002, 2003–2004, 2007–2008
- Sufia Wali – 1. FC Saarbrücken – 2001–2002
- Michele Weissenhofer – SGS Essen – 2010–2011
- Ingrid Wells – Turbine Potsdam – 2013–2015
- Keelin Winters Pattillo (née Winters) – Turbine Potsdam – 2012–2013
- Tracey Winzen – VfL Wolfsburg – 2003–2005
- Amber Wisner (née Brooks) – Bayern Munich – 2012–2015
- **Taylor Ziemer** – 1. FC Köln – 2024–

== Oceania (OFC) ==
=== New Zealand ===
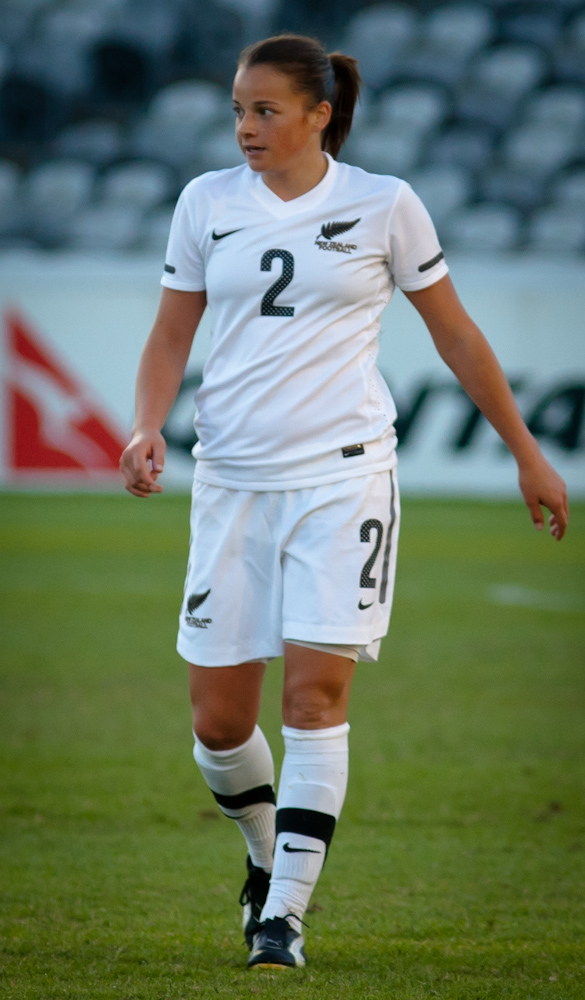
(New Zealand) Ria Percival

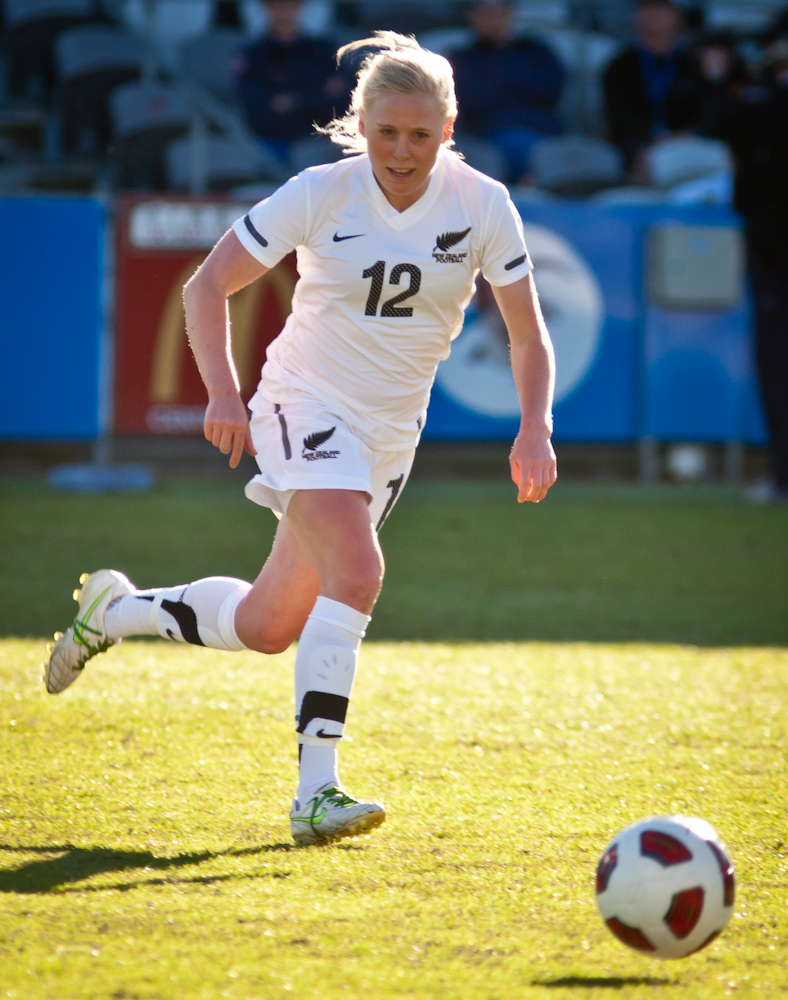
(New Zealand) Betsy Hassett

- CJ Bott – FF USV Jena – 2017–2018
- Hannah Bromley – Herforder SV – 2010–2011
- Katie Duncan (née Hoyle) – SC 07 Bad Neuenahr – 2011–2012
- Abby Erceg – FF USV Jena – 2013–2015
- Victoria Esson – SC Sand – 2021–2022
- Anna Green – Lokomotive Leipzig – 2011–2012
- Sarah Gregorius – SC 07 Bad Neuenahr – 2011–2013
- Suya Haering – Turbine Potsdam, Carl Zeiss Jena – 2024–2026
- Maya Hahn – SV Meppen, Turbine Potsdam – 2020–2021, 2022–2023, 2024–2025
- Betsy Hassett – Werder Bremen – 2015–2016
- Amber Hearn – FF USV Jena, 1. FC Köln – 2011–2018
- Rachel Howard – TSV Crailsheim – 2006–2008
- Emma Kete – SC 07 Bad Neuenahr – 2012–2013
- Meikayla Moore – 1. FC Köln, MSV Duisburg – 2017–2020
- Erin Nayler – Bayern Munich – 2023–2024
- Ria Percival – 1. FFC Frankfurt, FF USV Jena – 2011–2016
- Jana Radosavljević – Werder Bremen, MSV Duisburg – 2020–2021, 2023–2024
- Ali Riley – Bayern Munich – 2019–2020
- Emma Rolston – MSV Duisburg – 2018–2019
- Paige Satchell – SC Sand – 2019–2020
- Rebecca Smith – FSV Frankfurt, VfL Wolfsburg – 2004–2005, 2008–2012
- Rebekah Stott – SC Sand – 2014–2015
- Nicole Stratford – FF USV Jena – 2019–2020
- Hannah Wilkinson – MSV Duisburg – 2020–2021

== South America (CONMEBOL) ==
=== Brazil ===
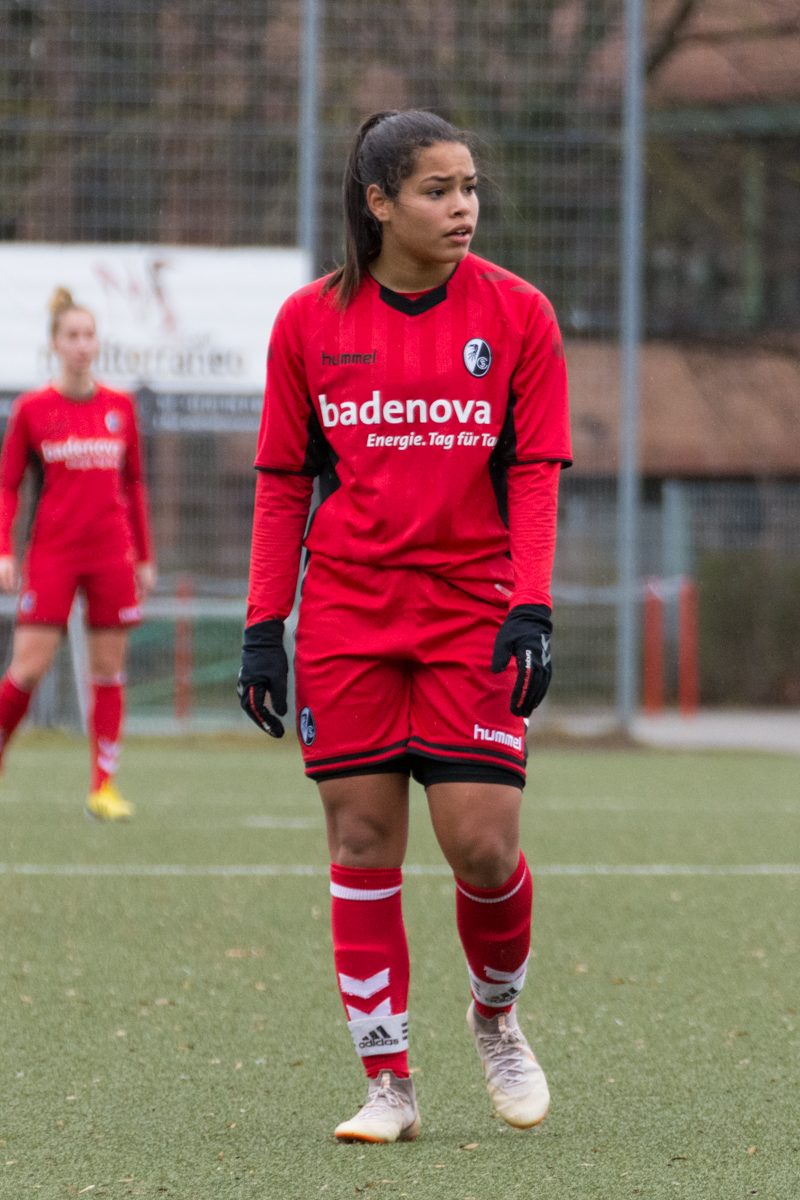
Ivana Fuso

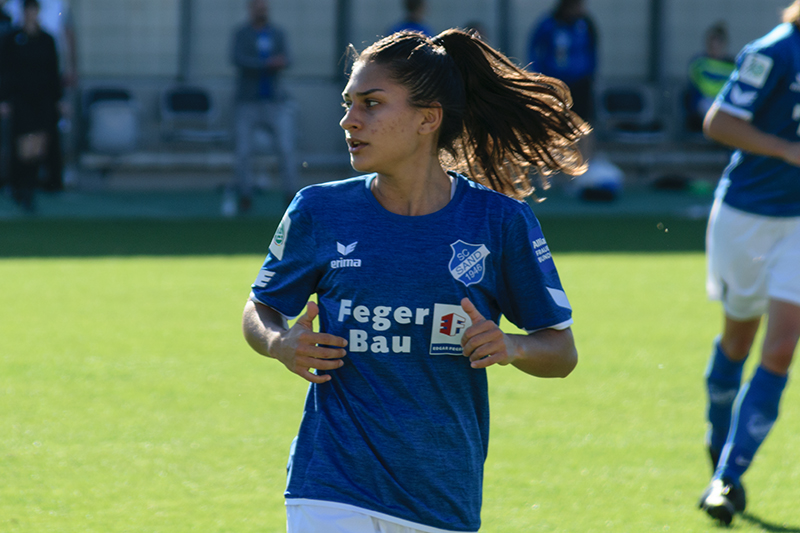
Letícia Santos

- Bárbara – BV Cloppenburg – 2013–2014
- Carol Carioca – FF USV Jena – 2009–2010
- Cristiane – Turbine Potsdam, VfL Wolfsburg – 2004–2007
- Ester – BV Cloppenburg – 2013–2014
- Ivana Fuso – SC Freiburg, Bayer Leverkusen – 2017–2019, 2022–2023
- Paula – VfL Wolfsburg – 2006–2007
- Cristiane Pezzato – VfL Wolfsburg – 2006–2007
- Letícia Santos – SC Sand, Eintracht Frankfurt – 2016–2024
- Tainara – Bayern Munich – 2022–2024
- Thalia – Turbine Potsdam – 2024–2025

=== Chile ===
- María José Rojas – Herforder SV – 2014–2015

=== Colombia ===
- Ana María Guzmán – Bayern Munich – 2024–2025
- Catalina Pérez – Werder Bremen – 2023–2024

== Summary ==
=== By nationality ===
- USA (69)
- Austria (50)
- Poland (49)
- Netherlands (48)
- Switzerland (45)
- Norway (42)
- Canada (39)
- Hungary (38)
- New Zealand (35)
- Turkey (29)
- Iceland (16)
- Ireland (6)
- Israel (6)
- Italy (9)
- Japan (27)
- France (28)
- Denmark (26)
- Russia (17)
- Sweden (17)
- Belgium (10)
- Australia (10)
- DR Congo (1)
- Ivory Coast (1)
- Nigeria (8)
- Curacao (1)
- England (7)
- Slovakia (6)
- Slovenia (7)
- Bulgaria (6)
- Finland (6)
- Bosnia and Herzegovina (6)
- Ghana (6)
- Albania (4)
- Kosovo (4)
- Algeria (3)
- Cameroon (2)
- Colombia (2)
- Montenegro (2)
- Tunisia (2)
- China (2)
- Latvia (2)
- Puerto Rico (2)
- Belarus (2)
- Chile (1)
- Jordan (1)
- Mali (1)
- Morocco (2)
- Luxembourg (1)
- Equatorial Guinea (1)
- Afghanistan (1)
- Syria (1)
- Wales (1)
- Jordan (1)
- Saint Kitts and Nevis (1)
- Ukraine (6)
- Afghanistan (1)
- South Korea (2)
- Portugal (6)
- Romania (5)
- Scotland (6)
- Serbia (3)
- Spain (11)
- Jamaica (1)
- Suriname (1)
- Mexico (1)
- Azerbaijan (1)
- Philippines (1)

=== By continent ===
- Europe (UEFA)
- North America and Caribbean (CONCACAF)
- Asia (AFC)
- Oceania (OFC)
- South America (CONMEBOL)
- Africa (CAF)

== Notes ==
1. Born in Bosnia and Herzegovina
2. Born in Canada
3. Born in England
4. Born in France
5. Born in Germany
6. Born in the Netherlands
7. Born in Serbia
8. Born in Spain
9. Born in Switzerland
10. Born in the United States
11. Born in West Germany
12. Capped for the Australia women's national under-17 soccer team
13. Capped for the Australia women's national under-20 soccer team
14. Capped for the Canada women's national football team
15. Capped for the Canada women's national under-17 football team
16. Capped for the Denmark women's national under-17 football team
17. Capped for the Denmark women's national under-19 football team
18. Capped for the France women's national under-17 football team
19. Capped for the France women's national under-19 football team
20. Capped for the France women's national under-20 football team
21. Capped for the France women's national under-23 football team
22. Capped for the Germany women's national under-15 football team
23. Capped for the Germany women's national under-16 football team
24. Capped for the Germany women's national under-17 football team
25. Capped for the Germany women's national under-19 football team
26. Capped for the Germany women's national under-20 football team
27. Capped for the Serbia women's national under-19 football team
28. Capped for the United States women's national under-21 football team
29. Capped for the United States women's national under-23 football team
