= 2026–27 VfL Wolfsburg (women) season =

German women's football club season

VfL Wolfsburg Frauen
2026–27 season
- Sporting director: Vanessa Bernauer
- Head coach: Stephan Lerch
- Stadium: AOK Stadion; Volkswagen Arena (Select home games)
- Bundesliga: Pre-season
- DFB-Pokal: First round
- DFB-Supercup: Runners-up
- UEFA Champions League: Third qualifying round

The 2026–27 VfL Wolfsburg Frauen season is the club's 23rd season since VfR Eintracht Wolfsburg joined VfL Wolfsburg as its women's section. The club will compete in the Bundesliga, DFB-Pokal, DFB-Supercup and the UEFA Champions League.

== Season summary ==
On 23 May 2026, the club announced it's summer schedule, with a training camp set in the Weimarer Land.

On 29 May 2026, former Wolfsburg player Vanessa Bernauer returned to the club as Director of Women's Football, succeeding Ralf Kellermann.

== Players ==
No.	Nat	Name	Date of birth (age)	Signed from	Since
Goalkeepers
1	(Germany)	Stina Johannes	23 January 2000 (age 26)	(Germany) Eintracht Frankfurt	2025
21	(Germany)	Martina Tufekovic	16 July 1994 (age 32)	(Germany) TSG Hoffenheim	2025
22	(Austria)	Christina Schönwetter	21 April 2005 (age 21)	(Austria) First Vienna	2025
40	(Germany)	Ylvi Eisenbeiß	30 January 2009 (age 17)	(Germany) Eintracht Frankfurt	2026
Defenders
2	(Norway)	Thea Bjelde	5 June 2000 (age 26)	(Norway) Vålerenga	2025
3	(Netherlands)	Lieske Carleer	16 April 2001 (age 25)	(Netherlands) Twente	2026
4	(Germany)	Sophia Kleinherne	12 April 2000 (age 26)	(Germany) Eintracht Frankfurt	2025
16	(Germany)	Camilla Küver	10 June 2003 (age 23)	(Germany) Eintracht Frankfurt	2023
20	(Germany)	Julia Landenberger	22 December 2003 (age 22)	(Germany) RB Leipzig	2026
23	(France)	Lou Bogaert	25 June 2004 (age 22)	(France) Paris FC	2026
24	(Germany)	Joelle Wedemeyer	12 August 1996 (age 30)	Academy	2013
33	(Spain)	Judit Pujols	25 February 2005 (age 21)	(Spain) Barcelona	2025
39	(Germany)	Sarai Linder	26 October 1999 (age 27)	(Germany) TSG Hoffenheim	2024
Midfielders
5	(Netherlands)	Ella Peddemors	6 August 2002 (age 24)	(Netherlands) Twente	2024
6	(Germany)	Janina Minge	11 June 1999 (age 27)	(Germany) SC Freiburg	2024
8	(Germany)	Lena Lattwein	2 May 2000 (age 26)	(Germany) TSG Hoffenheim	2021
10	(Germany)	Svenja Huth	25 January 1991 (age 35)	(Germany) Turbine Potsdam	2019
14	(Switzerland)	Smilla Vallotto	23 March 2004 (age 22)	(Sweden) Hammarby	2025
15	(Poland)	Weronika Araśniewicz	15 March 2008 (age 18)	(Spain) Barcelona	2026
17	(Germany)	Katharina Pilijić	5 September 2003 (age 22)	(Germany) Bayer Leverkusen	2026
Forwards
7	(Germany)	Giovanna Hoffmann	20 September 1998 (age 27)	(Germany) RB Leipzig	2026
9	(Slovenia)	Lara Prašnikar	8 August 1998 (age 28)	(United States) Utah Royals	2026
13	(Denmark)	Cecilie Fløe	8 October 2001 (age 24)	(Italy) Napoli	2026
18	(Germany)	Mara Alber	6 September 2005 (age 20)	(England) Chelsea (loan)	2026
19	(France)	Kessya Bussy	19 June 2001 (age 25)	(France) Paris FC	2025
28	(Germany)	Cora Zicai	29 November 2004 (age 21)	(Germany) SC Freiburg	2025
38	(Norway)	Anny Kerim-Lindland	21 March 2007 (age 19)	(Germany) 1. FC Nürnberg	2025
41	(Norway)	Linnea Sælen	19 February 2006 (age 20)	(Norway) Arna-Bjørnar	2025

== Transfers ==
=== In ===
Pos	Player	From club	Fee	Date	Source
FW	(Germany) Giovanna Hoffmann	(Germany) RB Leipzig	Free	3 March 2026	
MF	(Germany) Katharina Piljić	(Germany) Bayer Leverkusen	Free	31 March 2026	
GK	(Germany) Ylvi Eisenbeiß	(Germany) Eintracht Frankfurt	Free	4 June 2026	
FW	(Denmark) Cecilie Fløe	(Italy) Napoli Women	Undisclosed	11 June 2026	
DF	(Netherlands) Lieske Carleer	(Netherlands) FC Twente	Free	9 July 2026	
DF	(Germany) Julia Landenberger	(Germany) RB Leipzig	Free	11 July 2026	
DF	(France) Lou Bogaert	(France) Paris FC	Undisclosed	17 July 2026	
FW	(Slovenia) Lara Prašnikar	(United States) Utah Royals	Undisclosed	13 August 2026	
FW	(Germany) Mara Alber	(England) Chelsea	Loan	14 August 2026	

=== Out ===
Pos	Player	To club	Fee	Date	Source
DF	(Netherlands) Caitlin Dijkstra	(England) Tottenham Hotspur	End of contract	27 May 2026	
FW	(Netherlands) Lineth Beerensteyn	(Spain) Real Madrid	Undisclosed	16 June 2026	
FW	(Germany) Vivien Endemann	(England) Liverpool	End of contract	1 July 2026	
FW	(Germany) Alexandra Popp	(Germany) Borussia Dortmund	End of contract	1 July 2026	
MF	(Norway) Justine Kielland	(England) Aston Villa	Undisclosed	3 July 2026	
DF	(Netherlands) Janou Levels	(Spain) Real Madrid	Undisclosed	11 July 2026	
MF	(Hungary) Luca Papp	(Italy) Sassuolo	Contract termination	13 July 2026	
DF	(Norway) Guro Bergsvand	(Italy) Fiorentina	Undisclosed	15 July 2026	
DF	(Germany) Karla Brinkmann	(Germany) SGS Essen			
GK	(Germany) Nelly Smolarczyk	(Germany) Union Berlin			

== Pre-season and friendlies ==
19 July 2026 Friendly	VfL Wolfsburg	3–2	SV Meppen	Herzlake
14:00	Kerim-Lindland 46', 82'; Pujols 84'	Report	Hubbeling 28'; Bode 33'	Stadium: Hasetalstadion; Attendance: 800

23 July 2026 Friendly	VfL Wolfsburg	2–0	PSV	Gifhorn
18:00		Report		Stadium: GWG-Stadion im Sportpark Flutmulde

1 August 2026 Friendly	RB Leipzig	1–3	VfL Wolfsburg	Markranstädt
14:00		Report		Stadium: Stadion am Bad Großfeld

9 August 2026 Friendly	Werder Bremen	1–3	VfL Wolfsburg	Bremen
15:00		Report		Stadium: Weserstadion Platz 11

== Competitions ==
=== DFB-Supercup ===
15 August 2026	Bayern Munich	3–0	VfL Wolfsburg	Audi Sportpark, Ingolstadt
19:30 CEST (UTC+2)	Damnjanović 32'; Bühl 45+4', 46'	Report		Attendance: 8,689; Referee: Angelika Söder

=== Bundesliga ===
==== Standings ====
Pos	Team	Pld	W	D	L	GF	GA	GD	Pts	Qualification or relegation
1	Bayern Munich	10	10	0	0	36	9	+27	30	Qualification for the Champions League league phase
2	VfL Wolfsburg	10	8	0	2	30	13	+17	24	Qualification for the Champions League third qualifying round
3	Eintracht Frankfurt	11	7	2	2	23	11	+12	23	Qualification for the Champions League second qualifying round
4	Bayer Leverkusen	11	7	1	3	21	14	+7	22	
5	Werder Bremen	11	6	2	3	22	16	+6	20	

Updated to match(es) played on 22 November 2026. Source: DFB
Rules for classification: 1) Points; 2) Goal difference; 3) Goals scored; 4) Head-to-head results; 5) Head-to-head away goals scored; 6) Away goals scored; 7) Play-off.

==== Results ====
22 August 2026 1	1. FC Nürnberg	2–8	VfL Wolfsburg	Nuremberg
14:00 CEST (UTC+2)	Proniez 14', (yellow card) 25' (yellow-red card) 51'; Meloni (yellow card) 28'; Bednorz 40'	Report	Minge 56' (pen.), 79' (pen.); Zicai 61', 65'; Araśniewicz 68'; Linder (yellow card) 68'; Peddemors 75', 90+5'; Küver 89'	Stadium: Max-Morlock-Stadion; Attendance: 1,307; Referee: Lara Wolf

30 August 2026 2	Bayer Leverkusen	1–2	VfL Wolfsburg	Leverkusen
16:00 CEST (UTC+2)	Ostermeier 51'; Misini (yellow card) 76'	Report	Peddemors 24'; Zicai 59'	Stadium: Ulrich-Haberland-Stadion; Attendance: 1,184; Referee: Franziska Wildfeuer

6 September 2026 3	VfL Wolfsburg	3–2	Werder Bremen	Wolfsburg
14:00 CEST (UTC+2)	Alber 57'; Linder (yellow card) 69'; Küver 88', 90+4'; Johannes (yellow card) 90+4'	Report	Vanzeir 14', (yellow card) 21'; Dhont 64'; Gmeineder (yellow card) 71'	Stadium: AOK Stadion; Attendance: 2,698; Referee: Miriam Schwermer

13 September 2026 4	VfB Stuttgart	0–2	VfL Wolfsburg	Stuttgart
14:00 CEST (UTC+2)	Arouna (yellow card) 51'	Report	Peddemors 3'; Minge (yellow card) 56'; Zicai 69'	Stadium: Gazi-Stadion auf der Waldau; Attendance: 3,820; Referee: Naemi Breier

18 September 2026 5	TSG Hoffenheim	2–1	VfL Wolfsburg	Sinsheim
18:30 CEST (UTC+2)	Hahn 25', 68'; Natter (yellow card) 88'; Fenger (yellow card) 90+5'	Report	Vallotto (yellow card) 45'; Kerim-Lindland 66'	Stadium: Dietmar-Hopp-Stadion; Attendance: 922; Referee: Sina Diekmann

4 October 2026 6	VfL Wolfsburg	2–1	Hamburger SV	Wolfsburg
13:45 CEST (UTC+2)	Peddemors 45'; Kerim-Lindland 80'; Huth (yellow card) 90+5'	Report	Linberg 47'; Bartz (yellow card) 75'; Doucouré (yellow card) 90+7'	Stadium: AOK Stadion; Attendance: 2,875; Referee: Nadine Westerhoff

18 October 2026 7	Mainz 05	0–5	VfL Wolfsburg	Mainz
18:30 CEST (UTC+2)	Bathmann (yellow card) 75'	Report	Vallotto (yellow card) 33'; Peddemors 36', 45+1'; Kerim-Lindland 48'; Huth 50'; Bussy 77', (yellow card) 81'	Stadium: Bruchwegstadion; Attendance: 1,400; Referee: Angelika Söder

24 October 2026 8	VfL Wolfsburg	3–0	1. FC Köln	Wolfsburg
12:00 CEST (UTC+2)	Peddemors 38', 59'; Minge (yellow card) 44'; Küver 62'; Zicai (yellow card) 81'; Carleer (yellow card) 90'	Report	Vogt (yellow card) 30'; Bohnen (yellow card) 45'; Imping (yellow card) 58'; Hendrich (yellow card) 75'	Stadium: AOK Stadion; Attendance: 2,334; Referee: Julia Boike

6 November 2026 9	Eintracht Frankfurt	1–3	VfL Wolfsburg	Frankfurt
18:30 CET (UTC+1)	Ilestedt 27'; Lührßen (yellow card) 68'	Report	Peddemors 13', 70'; Prašnikar (yellow card) 40'; Vallotto (yellow card) 44', (goal) 50'	Stadium: Stadion am Brentanobad; Referee: Selina Menzel

14 November 2026 10	VfL Wolfsburg	1–4	Bayern Munich	Wolfsburg
17:55 CET (UTC+1)	Fløe 90+2'	Report	Amani 36', 81', (yellow card) 51'; Dallmann 45+2'; Minge 57' (o.g.); Naschenweng (yellow card) 79'; Imade (yellow card) 87'	Stadium: Volkswagen Arena; Attendance: 9,015; Referee: Franziska Wildfeuer

22 November 2026 11	RB Leipzig	1–2	VfL Wolfsburg	Leipzig
16:00 CET (UTC+1)	Boboy 61'; Schimmer (yellow card) 90+3'	Report	Fløe 46'; Vallotto 48'; Linder (yellow card) 88'	Stadium: RB-Trainingzentrum, Platz 1 Referee: Davina Lutz

11 – 14 December 2026 12	SC Freiburg	v	VfL Wolfsburg	Freiburg
		Report		Stadium: Dreisamstadion

18 – 21 December 2026 13	VfL Wolfsburg	v	Union Berlin	Wolfsburg
		Report		Stadium: AOK Stadion

15 – 18 January 2027 14	VfL Wolfsburg	v	1. FC Nürnberg	Wolfsburg
		Report		Stadium: AOK Stadion

22 – 25 January 2027 15	VfL Wolfsburg	v	Bayer Leverkusen	Wolfsburg
		Report		Stadium: AOK Stadion

29 January – 1 February 2027 16	Werder Bremen	v	VfL Wolfsburg	Bremen
		Report

5 – 8 February 2027 17	VfL Wolfsburg	v	VfB Stuttgart	Wolfsburg
		Report		Stadium: AOK Stadion

12 – 15 February 2027 18	VfL Wolfsburg	v	TSG Hoffenheim	Wolfsburg
		Report		Stadium: AOK Stadion

19 – 22 February 2027 19	Hamburger SV	v	VfL Wolfsburg	Hamburg
		Report

12 – 15 March 2027 20	VfL Wolfsburg	v	Mainz 05	Wolfsburg
		Report		Stadium: AOK Stadion

19 – 22 March 2027 21	1. FC Köln	v	VfL Wolfsburg	Cologne
		Report

27 – 29 March 2027 22	VfL Wolfsburg	v	Eintracht Frankfurt	Wolfsburg
		Report		Stadium: AOK Stadion

9 – 12 April 2027 23	Bayern Munich	v	VfL Wolfsburg	Munich
		Report

30 April – 3 May 2027 24	VfL Wolfsburg	v	RB Leipzig	Wolfsburg
		Report		Stadium: AOK Stadion

7 – 10 May 2027 25	VfL Wolfsburg	v	SC Freiburg	Wolfsburg
		Report		Stadium: AOK Stadion

23 May 2027 26	Union Berlin	v	VfL Wolfsburg	Berlin
		Report

=== DFB-Pokal ===
27 September 2026 First round	SC Sand	0–6	VfL Wolfsburg	Willstätt
14:00 CEST (UTC+2)		Report	Peddemors 18', 46'; Huth 26', 53'; Küver 35'; Lattwein 64'	Stadium: Adams Arena; Attendance: 1,204; Referee: Selina Menzel

2 November 2026 Round of 16	VfL Wolfsburg	8–0	TSG Hoffenheim	Wolfsburg
18:00	Carleer 2'; Zicai 11', 41'; Minge 22'; Prašnikar 24'; Lattwein 63', 75'; Fløe 85'	Report		Stadium: AOK Stadion; Attendance: 1,226; Referee: Anna-Lena Heidenreich

=== UEFA Women's Champions League ===
==== Third Qualifying Round ====
The third round draw was held on 11 August 2026.

26 August 2026 1st leg	VfL Wolfsburg (Germany)	2–0	(Italy) Inter Milan	Wolfsburg
18:00	Prašnikar 42'; Küver 52'; Huth (yellow card) 86'	Report	Robustellini (red card) 49'; Polli (yellow card) 49'; Bartoli (yellow card) 58'	Stadium: Wolfsburg Stadion; Referee: Iuliana Demetrescu (Romania)

2 September 2026 2nd leg	Inter Milan (Italy)	3–1 (5–4 p)	(Germany) VfL Wolfsburg	Sesto San Giovanni
18:30	Bartoli 39'; Milinković (yellow card) 45+3'; Polli 85'; Tomašević (yellow card) 103'; Milinković 120'; Rúnarsdóttir (yellow card) 120'	Report	Minge (yellow card) 90'; Kerim-Lindland (yellow card) 90+2'; Araśniewicz 111'; Wedemeyer (yellow card) 120'	Stadium: Stadio Ernesto Breda; Attendance: 350; Referee: Olatz Rivera Olmedo (Spain)
	Penalties
	Magull (penalty scored); Bugeja (penalty scored); Schough (penalty scored); Milinković (penalty scored); Andrés (penalty scored)		(penalty scored) Minge; (penalty scored) Peddemors; (penalty scored) Linder; (penalty scored) Araśniewicz; (penalty missed) Alber

=== UEFA Women's Europa Cup ===
==== Second Qualifying Round ====
23 September 2026 1st leg	VfL Wolfsburg (Germany)	6–1	(Austria) Sturm Graz	Wolfsburg
19:00	Peddemors 10'; Prašnikar 13'; Vallotto 30'; Huth 37'; Piljić 83'; Lattwein 86'	Report	Pulins 53'	Stadium: AOK Stadion; Attendance: 1,307; Referee: Frederikke Lydia Søkjær (Denmark)

30 September 2026 2nd leg	Sturm Graz (Austria)	0–2	(Germany) VfL Wolfsburg	Graz
18:30		Report	Bogaert 32'; Kerim-Lindland 84'	Stadium: Liebenauer Stadium; Attendance: 1,649; Referee: Emily Heaslip (England)

VfL Wolfsburg won 8–1 on aggregate.

==== Knockout phase ====
The draw for the knockout phase was held on 2 October 2026.

===== Round of 16 =====
28 October 2026 1st leg	VfL Wolfsburg (Germany)	7–0	(Netherlands) Feyenoord	Wolfsburg
19:00	Prašnikar 2' (pen.), 49'; Zicai 28', 31', 36'; Kleinherne (yellow card) 45+6'; Fløe 65' (pen.); Paliama 67' (o.g.)	Report	de Graaf (yellow card) 18'	Stadium: AOK Stadion; Attendance: 1,207; Referee: Karoline Marie Jensen (Norway)

10 November 2026 2nd leg	Feyenoord (Netherlands)	0–3	(Germany) VfL Wolfsburg	Rotterdam
19:00	DellaPeruta (yellow card) 44'; Haverhoek (yellow card) 57'; de Paus (yellow card) 65'	Report	Piljić 73'; Kerim-Lindland 83'; Bussy 87'	Stadium: Sportcomplex Varkenoord; Attendance: 492; Referee: Emily Heaslip (England)

VfL Wolfsburg won 10–0 on aggregate.

===== Quarter-finals =====
3–4 Feb 2027 1st leg	Brøndby (Denmark)	v	(Germany) VfL Wolfsburg

10–11 Feb 2027 2nd leg	VfL Wolfsburg (Germany)	v	(Denmark) Brøndby
