= 2026–27 Frauen-Bundesliga =

Frauen-Bundesliga
- Season: 2026–27
- Dates: 21 August 2026 – 23 May 2027
- Matches: 76
- Goals: 266 (3.5 per match)
- Top goalscorer: Ella Peddemors (11 goals)
- Biggest home win: RB Leipzig 5–0 Mainz; Munich 5–0 Stuttgart; Hamburg 6–1 Mainz
- Biggest away win: Nürnberg 2–8 Wolfsburg
- Highest scoring: Nürnberg 2–8 Wolfsburg
- Longest winning run: 10 games Munich
- Longest unbeaten run: 10 games Munich
- Longest winless run: 10 games Mainz
- Longest losing run: 10 games Mainz
- Attendance: 228,516 (3,007 per match)
- All statistics correct as of 22 November 2026.

The 2026–27 season of the Frauen-Bundesliga is the 37th season of Germany's premier women's football league. It runs from 21 August 2026 to 23 May 2027.

== Teams ==
Locations of teams in the 2026–27 Frauen-Bundesliga

=== Team changes ===
| Promoted from 2025–26 2. Bundesliga | Relegated from 2025–26 Bundesliga |
|---|---|
| VfB Stuttgart; Mainz 05 | Carl Zeiss Jena; SGS Essen |

=== Stadiums ===
| Team | Home city | Home ground | Capacity |
|---|---|---|---|
| Union Berlin | Berlin | Stadion An der Alten Försterei | 22,012 |
| Werder Bremen | Bremen | Weserstadion Platz 11 | 5,500 |
| Eintracht Frankfurt | Frankfurt | Stadion am Brentanobad | 5,650 |
| SC Freiburg | Freiburg | Dreisamstadion | 24,000 |
| Hamburger SV | Hamburg | Volksparkstadion | 57,000 |
| TSG Hoffenheim | Hoffenheim | Dietmar-Hopp-Stadion | 6,350 |
| 1. FC Köln | Cologne | Franz-Kremer-Stadion | 5,457 |
| RB Leipzig | Leipzig | Sportanlage Gontardweg | 1,300 |
| Bayer Leverkusen | Leverkusen | Ulrich-Haberland-Stadion | 3,200 |
| Mainz 05 | Mainz | Bruchwegstadion | 7,134 |
| Bayern Munich | Munich | FC Bayern Campus | 2,500 |
| 1. FC Nürnberg | Nuremberg | Max-Morlock-Stadion | 50,000 |
| VfB Stuttgart | Stuttgart | Gazi-Stadion auf der Waldau | 11,468 |
| VfL Wolfsburg | Wolfsburg | AOK Stadion | 5,200 |

== League table ==
| Pos | Team | Pld | W | D | L | GF | GA | GD | Pts | Qualification or relegation |
|---|---|---|---|---|---|---|---|---|---|---|
| 1 | Bayern Munich | 10 | 10 | 0 | 0 | 36 | 9 | +27 | 30 | Qualification for the Champions League league phase |
| 2 | VfL Wolfsburg | 11 | 9 | 0 | 2 | 32 | 14 | +18 | 27 | Qualification for the Champions League third qualifying round |
| 3 | Eintracht Frankfurt | 11 | 7 | 2 | 2 | 23 | 11 | +12 | 23 | Qualification for the Champions League second qualifying round |
| 4 | Bayer Leverkusen | 11 | 7 | 1 | 3 | 21 | 14 | +7 | 22 | |
| 5 | Werder Bremen | 11 | 6 | 2 | 3 | 22 | 16 | +6 | 20 | |
| 6 | 1. FC Köln | 11 | 6 | 1 | 4 | 19 | 15 | +4 | 19 | |
| 7 | TSG Hoffenheim | 10 | 4 | 1 | 5 | 13 | 16 | −3 | 13 | |
| 8 | SC Freiburg | 11 | 4 | 1 | 6 | 13 | 19 | −6 | 13 | |
| 9 | Union Berlin | 11 | 3 | 2 | 6 | 15 | 22 | −7 | 11 | |
| 10 | VfB Stuttgart | 11 | 3 | 2 | 6 | 13 | 26 | −13 | 11 | |
| 11 | RB Leipzig | 11 | 3 | 1 | 7 | 17 | 24 | −7 | 10 | |
| 12 | Hamburger SV | 11 | 2 | 3 | 6 | 20 | 20 | 0 | 9 | |
| 13 | 1. FC Nürnberg | 11 | 2 | 2 | 7 | 16 | 25 | −9 | 8 | Relegation to 2. Bundesliga |
| 14 | Mainz 05 | 11 | 1 | 0 | 10 | 7 | 36 | −29 | 3 | Relegation to 2. Bundesliga |

Updated to match(es) played on 22 November 2026. Source: DFB
Rules for classification: 1) Points; 2) Goal difference; 3) Goals scored; 4) Head-to-head results; 5) Head-to-head away goals scored; 6) Away goals scored; 7) Play-off.

== Results ==
| Home \ Away | BER | BRE | FRA | FRE | HAM | HOF | KÖL | LEI | LEV | MAI | MUN | NÜR | STU | WOL |
|---|---|---|---|---|---|---|---|---|---|---|---|---|---|---|
| Union Berlin | — | | 0–1 | | | 1–1 | | 3–2 | 0–3 | | 1–4 | 2–1 | | |
| Werder Bremen | 2–0 | — | | 4–3 | 1–0 | 3–0 | | 2–0 | | | | | 1–1 | |
| Eintracht Frankfurt | | | — | | 2–0 | 4–2 | 2–0 | | | | 0–1 | 1–1 | | 1–3 |
| SC Freiburg | 1–0 | | | — | | | | 0–3 | 1–2 | 3–0 | | 0–4 | 2–0 | |
| Hamburger SV | 4–4 | | | 1–1 | — | | | 1–1 | | 6–1 | | 5–1 | | |
| TSG Hoffenheim | | | | 1–0 | | — | | | 1–2 | 3–1 | | | 1–2 | 2–1 |
| 1. FC Köln | 3–0 | 2–2 | | 0–1 | 3–1 | 1–0 | — | 3–1 | | | | | | |
| RB Leipzig | | | 1–5 | | | | | — | 0–2 | 5–0 | 1–5 | 2–1 | | 1–2 |
| Bayer Leverkusen | | 3–2 | 1–1 | | 2–0 | | | | — | | 2–3 | | | 1–2 |
| Mainz 05 | | 1–2 | 2–3 | | | | 0–4 | | | — | | 1–0 | 1–3 | 0–5 |
| Bayern Munich | | 3–1 | | 4–1 | | | 5–2 | | | 2–0 | — | | 5–0 | |
| 1. FC Nürnberg | | | | | | 1–2 | 0–1 | | 2–0 | | | — | 3–3 | 2–8 |
| VfB Stuttgart | 0–4 | | 0–3 | | 2–1 | | | | 2–3 | | | | — | 0–2 |
| VfL Wolfsburg | | 3–2 | | | 2–1 | | 3–0 | | | | 1–4 | | | — |

Updated to match(es) played on 22 November 2026. Source: DFB
Legend: Blue = home team win; Yellow = draw; Red = away team win.

== Statistics ==
=== Top scorers ===
As of 16 November 2026

| Rank | Player | Club | Goals |
|---|---|---|---|
| 1 | (Netherlands) Ella Peddemors | VfL Wolfsburg | 11 |
| 2 | (Germany) Klara Bühl | Bayern Munich | 6 |
| 2 | (Germany) Laura Freigang | Eintracht Frankfurt | 6 |
| 2 | (Spain) Edna Imade | Bayern Munich | 6 |
| 2 | (Norway) Camilla Linberg | Hamburger SV | 6 |
| 6 | (Germany) Cornelia Kramer | Bayer Leverkusen | 5 |
| 6 | (France) Fany Proniez | 1. FC Nürnberg | 5 |
| 6 | (Germany) Svea Stoldt | Hamburger SV | 5 |
| 9 | (Germany) Pauline Bremer | 1. FC Köln | 4 |
| 9 | (Poland) Nikola Karczewska | Hamburger SV | 4 |
| 9 | (Germany) Camilla Küver | VfL Wolfsburg | 4 |
| 9 | (Hungary) Emőke Pápai | 1. FC Nürnberg | 4 |
| 9 | (Netherlands) Alieke Tuin | RB Leipzig | 4 |
| 9 | (Germany) Cora Zicai | VfL Wolfsburg | 4 |

=== Hat-tricks ===
| Player | Club | Against | Result | Date |
|---|---|---|---|---|
| (Germany) Pauline Bremer | 1. FC Köln | Hamburger SV | 3–1 (H) | 17 October 2026 |
| (Germany) Svea Stoldt | Hamburger SV | Union Berlin | 4–4 (H) | 25 October 2026 |

=== Clean sheets ===
As of 16 November 2026

| Rank | Player | Club | Clean sheets |
|---|---|---|---|
| 1 | (Germany) Lisa Schmitz | 1. FC Köln | 4 |
| 2 | (Germany) Lina Altenburg | Eintracht Frankfurt | 3 |
| 2 | (Austria) Mariella El Sherif | Werder Bremen | 3 |
| 2 | (Germany) Stina Johannes | VfL Wolfsburg | 3 |
| 2 | (Germany) Ena Mahmutovic | Bayern Munich | 3 |
| 2 | (Germany) Anna Reimann | SC Freiburg | 3 |
| 7 | (Germany) Rafaela Borggräfe | Bayer Leverkusen | 2 |
| 7 | (Switzerland) Elvira Herzog | RB Leipzig | 2 |
| 7 | (Switzerland) Lourdes Romero | 1. FC Nürnberg | 2 |
| 10 | (Switzerland) Nadine Böhi | Union Berlin | 1 |
| 10 | (Germany) Laura Dick | TSG Hoffenheim | 1 |
| 10 | (Germany) Vanessa Fischer | Werder Bremen | 1 |

== See also ==
- 2026 DFB-Supercup Frauen
- 2026–27 DFB-Pokal Frauen
