= 2026–27 DFB-Pokal Frauen =

Tournament details
- Country: Germany
- Venue(s): RheinEnergieStadion, Cologne
- Dates: 15 August 2026 – 17 May 2027

Tournament statistics
- Matches played: 40
- Goals scored: 175 (4.38 per match)
- Attendance: 43,077 (1,077 per match)
- Top goal scorer(s): seven players (3 goals)
- All statistics correct as of 2 November 2026. Goals scored in penalty shoot-outs not included.

The 2026–27 DFB-Pokal will be the 45th season of the annual German football cup competition. Several teams participate in the competition, including all teams from the previous year's Frauen-Bundesliga and the 2. Frauen-Bundesliga, excluding second teams. The competition will begin on 15 August 2026 with the first of six rounds and will end on 17 May 2027 with the final at the RheinEnergieStadion in Cologne, a nominally neutral venue, which has hosted the final since 2010.

== Participating clubs ==
The following clubs qualified for the competition:

Bundesliga the 14 clubs of the 2025–26 season	2. Bundesliga; 11 of the 14 clubs of the 2025–26 season (Note: Second teams are not eligible. Because TSG Hoffenheim II was promoted from Regionalliga, the remaining non-second team 2025–26 season, VfR Warbeyen gets their spot.)	Regionalliga one promoted team from the Regionalliga of the 2025–26 season
Union Berlin; Werder Bremen; SGS Essen; Eintracht Frankfurt; SC Freiburg; Hamburger SV; TSG Hoffenheim; Carl Zeiss Jena; 1. FC Köln; Bayer Leverkusen; RB Leipzig; Bayern Munich; 1. FC Nürnberg; VfL Wolfsburg	SG Andernach; Viktoria Berlin; VfL Bochum; FC Ingolstadt; Mainz 05; SV Meppen; Borussia Mönchengladbach; Turbine Potsdam; SC Sand; VfB Stuttgart; VfR Warbeyen	Hertha BSC
Verbandspokal the 21 winners of the regional association cups
Baden: Karlsruher SC; Bavaria: Greuther Fürth; Berlin: Berolina Mitte; Brandenburg: FSV Babelsberg 74; Bremen: ATS Buntentor; Hamburg: FC St. Pauli; Hesse: Sportfreunde Blau-Gelb Marburg	Lower Rhine: MSV Duisburg; Lower Saxony: Hannover 96; FC Jesteburg-Bendestorf (Note: Second teams are not eligible. Because 1. FC Köln II was promoted from Regionalliga, a second team from the regional association with the most women's clubs, will get an additional spot.); Mecklenburg-Vorpommern: Hansa Rostock; Middle Rhine: Fortuna Köln; Rhineland: TuS Issel; Saarland: 1. FC Saarbrücken; Saxony: Chemnitzer FC	Saxony-Anhalt: 1. FC Magdeburg; Schleswig-Holstein: Holstein Kiel; South Baden: Alemannia Zähringen; Southwest: Wormatia Worms; Thuringia: 1. FFV Erfurt; Westphalia: Schalke 04; Württemberg: SV Eutingen

== Format ==
The 21 regional cup winners, the three promoted teams from the Regionalliga and eight teams from the 2. Bundesliga compete in a play-off round. Teams from the Bundesliga and the two-highest 2. Bundesliga teams will enter in the first round. After that, the first round will be played by the remaining 32 teams without restrictions.

== Schedule ==
The rounds of the 2026–27 competition are scheduled as follows:

Round	Matches
Playoffs	15–17 August 2026
First round	26–27 September 2026
Round of 16	30 October – 2 November 2026
Quarter-finals	10–11 March 2027
Semi-finals	3–4 April 2027
Final	17 May 2027 at RheinEnergieStadion, Cologne

Times up to 24 October 2026 and from 27 March 2027 are CEST (UTC+2). Times from 25 October 2026 to 28 March 2027 are CET (UTC+1).

== Matches ==
=== Playoffs ===
The draw took place on 26 June 2026, with Silke Rottenberg drawing the matches. The matches took place between 15 and 17 August 2026.

15 August 2026	Hansa Rostock	0–6	VfL Bochum	Rostock
11:00		Report	Hoppius 3', 11'; Figueira 8'; Wenzel 15'; Gentile 59'; Lange 76'	Stadium: Volksstadion; Attendance: 153; Referee: Anna-Lena Heidenreich

15 August 2026	FC Jesteburg-Bendestorf	0–5	Hertha BSC	Jesteburg
15:00		Report	Saeland 14'; Dreher 45+6'; Poock 78'; Wellhausen 85'; Reimold 90+1'	Stadium: Stadion am alten Moor; Attendance: 504; Referee: Antonia Tucholski

15 August 2026	Schalke 04	7–0	Hannover 96	Gelsenkirchen
15:00	Vogel 12', 63'; Von der Laan 28'; Opladen 35', 37'; Bollmann 73'; Lammers 90+3'	Report		Stadium: Parkstadion; Attendance: 540; Referee: Sina Diekmann

15 August 2026	MSV Duisburg	1–2	Borussia Mönchengladbach	Duisburg
15:30	Carstensen 73'	Report	Jones-Baidoe 17'; Scholten 30'	Stadium: Nachwuchsleistungszentrum Westender Straße; Attendance: 222; Referee: Anna-Lena Weiss

16 August 2026	Holstein Kiel	0–3	1. FC Magdeburg	Kiel
12:00		Report	Miyoshi 10'; Bölke 37'; Abraham 69'	Stadium: Citti Fußball Park Arena; Attendance: 300; Referee: Monique Panetta

16 August 2026	Chemnitzer FC	0–6	Sportfreunde Blau-Gelb Marburg	Chemnitz
12:00		Report	Hutera 18' (pen.), 59'; Schürmann 26', 53'; Kundermann 41'; Bölke 37'; Nickel 72'	Stadium: Stadion Neubauernweg; Attendance: 107; Referee: Lea Kretschmar

16 August 2026	Wormatia Worms	0–10	SV Eutingen	Worms
13:00		Report	Notter 7'; Luz 12', 56', 61'; Rinderknecht 29', 32', 43'; Chrzanowski 45'; Baderschneider 70', 85'	Stadium: EWR-Arena; Attendance: 250; Referee: Michelle Gottdang

16 August 2026	ATS Buntentor	3–0	Berolina Mitte	Bremen
14:00	Volkmer 19'; Schüler 34' (o.g.); Zago 54'	Report		Stadium: Sportanlage Stadtwerder/Kuhhirten; Attendance: 243; Referee: Lara Wolf

16 August 2026	VfR Warbeyen	1–3	Viktoria Berlin	Kleve
14:00	Homan 50'	Report	Reuter 26'; Aydin 72'; Urbanek 79'	Stadium: Bresserbergstadion; Attendance: 250; Referee: Sandra Gasch

16 August 2026	FSV Babelsberg 74	0–4	Turbine Potsdam	Potsdam
14:00		Report	Hüsch 25'; Lindner 41'; Schmidt 55'; Rejkjær 66'	Stadium: Karl-Liebknecht-Stadion; Attendance: 612; Referee: Jette Wolf

16 August 2026	1. FFV Erfurt	1–1 (a.e.t.) (1–4 p)	FC Ingolstadt	Erfurt
14:00	Hasenbein 90+2'	Report	Berger 19' (o.g.)	Stadium: Sportforum Johannesplatz; Attendance: 110; Referee: Miriam Schwermer
	Penalties
	Stahl (penalty scored)		(penalty scored) Fritz; (penalty scored) Beyer; (penalty scored) Keul; (penalty scored) Gaugigl

16 August 2026	1. FC Saarbrücken	1–3	Greuther Fürth	Saarbrücken
14:00	Agyei 81'	Report	Wölfel 46'; Gruber 52', 67'	Stadium: Ludwigsparkstadion; Attendance: 250; Referee: Sina Gieringer

16 August 2026	Fortuna Köln	1–2	SG Andernach	Cologne
14:00	Bender 79'	Report	Pfeiffer 55'; Schraa 59'	Stadium: Betriebssportanlage Bocklemünd; Attendance: 450; Referee: Christina Junkers

16 August 2026	FC St. Pauli	0–1	SV Meppen	Hamburg
15:00		Report	Castrellon 77'	Stadium: Adolf-Jäger-Kampfbahn; Attendance: 1,063; Referee: Levke Scholz

16 August 2026	Alemannia Zähringen	0–7	SC Sand	Gundelfingen
16:00		Report	Ugochukwu 26'; Fischer 51' (pen.); Reininger 52'; Alp 55'; Schwarz 80'; Kirchmann 86'; Schneider 88'	Stadium: Obermattenstadion; Attendance: 500; Referee: Kerstin Holzmayer

16 August 2026	Karlsruher SC	8–0	TuS Issel	Karlsruhe
17:00	Iriguchi 7'; Zweigner-Genzer 23', 40', 50'; Kimmig 34'; Rothenberger 48', 90+51'; Dillmann 90+35'	Report		Stadium: Badenia-Stadion; Attendance: 248; Referee: Paula Mayer

=== First round ===
The draw took place on 17 August 2026, with Kerstin Garefrekes drawing the matches. The matches took place on 26 and 27 September 2026.

26 September 2026	FC Ingolstadt	1–6	Mainz 05	Ingolstadt
14:00	Reischmann 6'	Report	Martin 30'; Kats 52', 73'; Jackson 60'; Stöhr 71', 89'	Stadium: ESV-Stadion; Attendance: 256; Referee: Kerstin Holzmayer

26 September 2026	SG Andernach	1–2	SC Freiburg	Andernach
14:00	Schraa 51' (pen.)	Report	Karl 9'; Stierli 26'	Stadium: Stadion Andernach; Attendance: 398; Referee: Annika Kost

26 September 2026	Hertha BSC	1–2	1. FC Köln	Berlin
14:00	Wellhausen 37'	Report	Zeller 14'; Bremer 51'	Stadium: Stadion auf dem Wurfplatz; Attendance: 1,169; Referee: Anke Hölscher

26 September 2026	SV Eutingen	0–6	Carl Zeiss Jena	Eutingen
15:00		Report	Olmala 14', 33'; Sinka 31'; Terakaj 78'; Wiesner 81', 82'	Stadium: Sportplatz Eutingen; Attendance: 1,150; Referee: Klara Sauer

26 September 2026	SV Meppen	1–2	Hamburger SV	Meppen
15:00	Bode 46'	Report	Bartz 49'; Obispo 90'	Stadium: Hänsch-Arena; Attendance: 898; Referee: Lara Wolf

26 September 2026	Turbine Potsdam	2–3 (a.e.t.)	VfB Stuttgart	Potsdam
15:00	Smith 45'; Preußler 71'	Report	Wieder 85'; Arouna 90+5'; Hagel 105'	Stadium: Karl-Liebknecht-Stadion; Attendance: 452; Referee: Monique Panetta

26 September 2026	VfL Bochum	0–1	Werder Bremen	Bochum
16:00		Report	Ulbrich 44'	Stadium: Lohrheidestadion; Attendance: 1,495; Referee: Naemi Breier

27 September 2026	Sportfreunde Blau-Gelb Marburg	0–2	RB Leipzig	Marburg
13:00		Report	Schasching 1'; Pfister 15'	Stadium: Georg-Gaßmann-Stadion; Attendance: 2,000; Referee: Paula Mayer

27 September 2026	Schalke 04	1–4	SGS Essen	Gelsenkirchen
13:00	Opladen 3'	Report	Bröring 25'; Brinkmann 45+2'; Baaß 59'; Köpp 64'	Stadium: Am Parkstadion; Attendance: 2,320; Referee: Nadine Westerhoff

27 September 2026	Greuther Fürth	1–4	TSG Hoffenheim	Fürth
13:00	Wolfram 59'	Report	Steiner 28' (pen.), 28' (pen.); Vöhringer 55'; Fenger 68'	Stadium: Julius-Hirsch-Sportzentrum; Attendance: 500; Referee: Marie-Theres Mühlbauer

27 September 2026	ATS Buntentor	0–10	1. FC Nürnberg	Bremen
13:00		Report	Lein 42', 53'; Varley 45'; Homann 48'; Meroni 50'; Pápai 63'; Barboz 73'; Lapassouse 76', 79', 81'	Stadium: SPA Stadtwerder; Attendance: 350; Referee: Sarah Willms

27 September 2026	1. FC Magdeburg	0–5	Union Berlin	Magdeburg
14:00		Report	Bauereisen 4'; Weidauer 27'; Kamber 45+1'; Reissner 46', 69'	Stadium: Avnet Arena; Attendance: 1,906; Referee: Lea Kretschma

27 September 2026	SC Sand	0–6	VfL Wolfsburg	Willstätt
14:00		Report	Peddemors 18', 46'; Huth 26', 53'; Küver 35'; Lattwein 64'	Stadium: Adams Arena; Attendance: 1,204; Referee: Selina Menzel

27 September 2026	Karlsruher SC	1–6	Eintracht Frankfurt	Karlsruhe
14:00	Steiner 80'	Report	Tolhoek 13', 65'; Mühlhaus 19', 53'; Lia 68'	Stadium: Badenia Stadion; Attendance: 890; Referee: Daniela Kottmann

27 September 2026	Viktoria Berlin	0–2 (a.e.t.)	Bayer Leverkusen	Berlin
14:00		Report	Sternad 94', 101'	Stadium: Stadion Lichterfelde; Attendance: 2,033; Referee: Levke Scholz

27 September 2026	Borussia Mönchengladbach	1–2	Bayern Munich	Mönchengladbach
15:00	Graf 45+2'	Report	Gilles 74', 80'	Stadium: Borussia-Park; Attendance: 6,608; Referee: Julia Boike

=== Round of 16 ===
The draw took place on 27 September 2026, with Rachel Rinast drawing the matches. The matches took place between 30 October and 2 November 2026.

30 October 2026	VfB Stuttgart	3–0	SGS Essen	Stuttgart
18:00	Rückert 19'; Wieder 42'; Stegemann 68'	Report		Stadium: Gazi-Stadion auf der Waldau; Attendance: 1,416; Referee: Sina Gieringer

31 October 2026	1. FC Köln	1–0	RB Leipzig	Cologne
13:00	Bremer 35'	Report		Stadium: Franz-Kremer-Stadion; Attendance: 1,841; Referee: Angelika Söder

31 October 2026	Hamburger SV	3–4 (a.e.t.)	Union Berlin	Hamburg
13:00	Linberg 10'; Bartz 33'; Wrede 90+4'	Report	Veit 68'; Pujols 72'; Bauereisen 80', 113'	Stadium: Volksparkstadion; Attendance: 3,229; Referee: Davina Lutz

1 November 2026	1. FC Nürnberg	0–0 (a.e.t.) (2–4 p)	Eintracht Frankfurt	Nuremberg
14:00		Report		Stadium: Max-Morlock-Stadion; Attendance: 949; Referee: Franziska Wildfeuer
	Penalties
	Lein (penalty scored); Pápai (penalty scored)		(penalty scored) Tolhoek; (penalty scored) Ilestedt; (penalty scored) Alguacil; (penalty scored) Bennison

1 November 2026	SC Freiburg	4–0	Carl Zeiss Jena	Freiburg
14:00	Ojukwu 21' (pen.); Schneider 28'; Brunold 45+1'; Vincze 90'	Report		Stadium: Dreisamstadion; Attendance: 1,285; Referee: Paula Mayer

1 November 2026	Mainz 05	0–2 (a.e.t.)	Werder Bremen	Mainz
14:00		Report	Gutmann 101', 116'	Stadium: Bruchwegstadion; Attendance: 1,400; Referee: Selina Menzel

1 November 2026	Bayern Munich	1–0	Bayer Leverkusen	Munich
15:00	Harder 73' (pen.)	Report		Stadium: FC Bayern Campus; Attendance: 2,300; Referee: Miriam Schwermer

2 November 2026	VfL Wolfsburg	8–0	TSG Hoffenheim	Wolfsburg
18:00	Carleer 2'; Zicai 11', 41'; Minge 22'; Prašnikar 24'; Lattwein 63', 75'; Fløe 85'	Report		Stadium: AOK Stadion; Attendance: 1,226; Referee: Anna-Lena Heidenreich

=== Quarter-finals ===
The matches will take place on 10 and 11 March 2027.

Qualified teams

- Union Berlin
- Werder Bremen
- Eintracht Frankfurt
- SC Freiburg
- 1. FC Köln
- Bayern Munich
- VfB Stuttgart
- VfL Wolfsburg

=== Semi-finals ===
The matches will take place on 3 and 4 April 2027.

=== Final ===
The final will take place on 17 May 2027.

== Top goalscorers ==
As of 2 November 2026 Goals scored in penalty shoot-outs are not included.

Rank	Player	Team	Goals
1	(Germany) Nele Bauereisen	Union Berlin	3
1	(France) Louna Lapassouse	1. FC Nürnberg	3
1	(Germany) Lena Lattwein	VfL Wolfsburg	3
1	(Germany) Tia Luz	SV Eutingen	3
1	(Germany) Jolina Opladen	Schalke 04	3
1	(Germany) Jana Rinderknecht	SV Eutingen	3
1	(Germany) Melissa Zweigner-Genzer	Karlsruher SC	3
8	27 players		2
