= Katharina Piljić =

German footballer (born 2003)

Personal information
- Date of birth: 5 September 2003 (age 23)
- Place of birth: Essen, Germany
- Height: 1.71 m (5 ft 7 in)
- Position: Midfielder

Team information
- Current team: VfL Wolfsburg
- Number: 17

Youth career
- VfL Sportfreunde
- Schwarz-Weiß Essen
- –2020: SGS Essen

Senior career*
Years	Team	Apps	(Gls)
2020–2024	SGS Essen	69	(2)
2024–2026	Bayer Leverkusen	44	(7)
2026–	VfL Wolfsburg	11	(0)

International career^{‡}
2017–2018	Germany U15	5	(0)
2018–2019	Germany U16	7	(0)
2019	Germany U17	1	(0)
2021	Germany U19	1	(0)
2024–	Germany U23	15	(1)
- * Club domestic league appearances and goals as of 22 November 2026 ‡ National team caps and goals as of 22:00, 15 October 2026 (UTC)

Katharina Piljić (born 5 September 2003) is a German professional footballer who plays as a midfielder for Frauen-Bundesliga club VfL Wolfsburg. She has previously played for SGS Essen and Bayer Leverkusen.

== Early life ==
Piljić was born and raised in Essen. She is of German and Croatian descent. She started playing football at the age of 6 with local club VfL Sportfreunde 07 before her spirit and talent earned her a move to ETB Schwarz-Weiß Essen in 2012. She spent most of her time at ETB playing as the only girl on a boys' team, with Piljić showing preference to the boys' style of play over that of women's football. Piljić eventually started playing for SGS Essen's youth academy at the U17 level. Playing as a defensive midfielder or centre-back, she amassed 29 under-17 Bundesliga appearances in her time with Essen.

== Club career ==
=== SGS Essen ===
On 18 April 2020, Piljić was promoted to SGS Essen's first team in her second year with the club. She made her Frauen-Bundesliga debut at the age of 16, earning the start in a 3–1 victory over SC Sand on 8 November 2020. She went on to make 13 league appearances in her first full season playing professionally. The following year, injury problems prevented Piljić from posting 90-minute performances. She was re-signed to a two-year contract extension ahead of the 2022–23 season, with Essen head coach Markus Högner hailing her potential to become a part of the team's backbone in the coming years. After playing out the two years of her new contract, Piljić declined an extension with Essen and departed from the club. She had made over 70 first-team appearances for Essen across all competitions.

=== Bayer Leverkusen ===
In April 2024, Piljić moved away from her hometown of Essen for the first time, signing a two-year contract with Bayer Leverkusen lasting until the summer of 2026. Leverkusen had previously attempted to recruit Piljić in 2014, when she was a child, but Piljić had chosen to join SGS Essen instead. Hailed as a replacement to Eintracht Frankfurt-bound Elisa Senß, Piljić quickly became an important piece of Leverkusen's team. She played the entirety of all but one of the club's league matches over the first half of the season and led the league in successful ball wins in that period. On 7 October 2024, she scored her first goal for Leverkusen, striking from the edge of the penalty area to notch the game-winning goal against Carl Zeiss Jena. She ended her first season at Leverkusen having recorded 18 league appearances and 2 goals.

In the 2025–26 season, Piljić continued to cement herself as a starter on Leverkusen's squad. On 17 October 2025, she scored her first goal of the season, a long-range chip from the halfway line to salvage a 2–2 draw with 1. FC Köln. Piljić's offensive production heated up in March 2026, with Piljić first scoring a half-volleyed game-winner against Carl Zeiss Jena on 22 March, before registering a goal and two assists in a 3–1 win over Hamburger SV on 30 March.

=== VfL Wolfsburg ===
One day after her standout performance for Leverkusen at HSV, Piljić was announced to be leaving the club upon the expiry of her contract in the summer to sign a two-year deal with VfL Wolfsburg.

== International career ==
Piljić received her first call-up to the German youth national team program at the age of 14, getting called-in to the U15 squad. In November 2017, she made her U15 debut, participating in a 6–1 defeat to the United States. Piljić continued to gain experience with various youth national teams ranging from the under-15 to under-19 squads over the coming years; she had made 13 appearances for her country by the time she signed her first professional contract with SGS Essen.

In October 2024, Piljić debuted for the under-23 national team. In March 2025, she scored her first youth international goal, the Germany U23's lone conversion in a 3–1 defeat to Portugal.

== Career statistics ==
=== Club ===
As of 22 November 2026

Appearances and goals by club, season and competition
Club	Season	League			Cup (Note: Includes the DFB-Pokal)		Continental		Other		Total	
Club	Season	Division	Apps	Goals	Apps	Goals	Apps	Goals	Apps	Goals	Apps	Goals
SGS Essen	2020–21	Frauen-Bundesliga	13	0	1	0	—		—		14	0
SGS Essen	2021–22	Frauen-Bundesliga	14	0	—		—		—		14	0
SGS Essen	2022–23	Frauen-Bundesliga	20	2	3	0	—		—		23	2
SGS Essen	2023–24	Frauen-Bundesliga	22	0	4	1	—		—		26	1
SGS Essen	Total		69	2	8	1	0	0	0	0	77	3
Bayer 04 Leverkusen	2024–25	Frauen-Bundesliga	18	2	2	0	—		—		20	2
Bayer 04 Leverkusen	2025–26	Frauen-Bundesliga	26	5	2	0	—		—		28	5
Bayer 04 Leverkusen	Total		44	7	4	0	0	0	0	0	48	7
VfL Wolfsburg	2026–27	Frauen-Bundesliga	11	0	1	0	4	2 (Note: Zero appearances in UEFA Women's Champions League qualifying rounds and four appearances and two Goals in the UEFA Women's Europa Cup)	1	0 (Note: Appearances in DFB-Supercup)	17	2
Career total			124	9	13	1	4	1	2	0	142	12
