= Caroline Kehrer =

Canadian soccer player

Personal information
- Full name: Caroline Victoria Kehrer
- Date of birth: 9 April 1997 (age 29)
- Place of birth: Winnipeg, Canada
- Height: 1.75 m (5 ft 9 in)
- Position: Forward

Team information
- Current team: Bayer Leverkusen
- Number: 9

College career
Years	Team	Apps	(Gls)
2015-2018	UAB Blazers	65	(15)

Senior career*
Years	Team	Apps	(Gls)
2020–2021	AaB	12	(0)
2021	Ferencvárosi TC	10	(3)
2021–2022	SCU Torreense	20	(11)
2022–2024	SC Braga	43	(21)
2024–	Bayer Leverkusen	43	(8)
- * Club domestic league appearances and goals as of 20 November 2026

Caroline Victoria Kehrer (born 9 April 1997) is a Canadian soccer player who plays for the Frauen-Bundesliga team Bayer Leverkusen. Kehrer has previously played for the Portuguese team SC Braga.

After graduating from the University of Alabama at Birmingham, Kehrer signed for the Danish team AaB.

== Honours ==
- Hungarian Champion: 2020–21
- Hungarian Women's Cup: 2021
