= Lou Bogaert =

French footballer (born 2004)

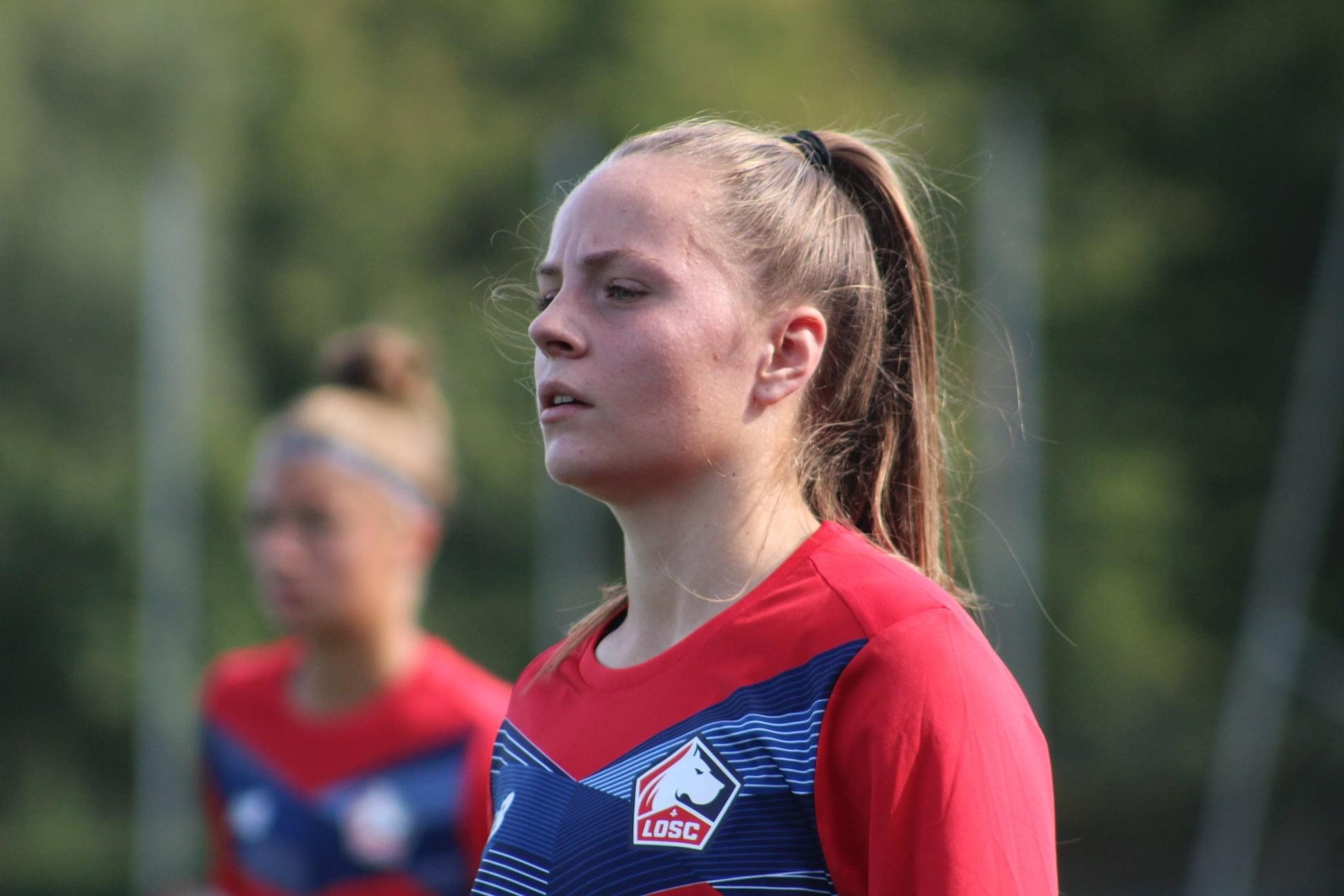
- Bogaert with Lille in 2021

Personal information
- Full name: Lou Valérie Bogaert
- Date of birth: 25 June 2004 (age 22)
- Place of birth: Villeneuve-d'Ascq, France
- Height: 1.66 m (5 ft 5 in)
- Position: Left-back

Team information
- Current team: VfL Wolfsburg
- Number: 23

Youth career
- 2010–2013: US Lesquin
- 2013–2017: Wasquehal
- 2017–2022: Lille

Senior career*
Years	Team	Apps	(Gls)
2021–2022	Lille	15	(2)
2022–2026	Paris FC	61	(3)
2026–	VfL Wolfsburg	4	(0)

International career^{‡}
2021–2023	France U19	17	(2)
2022	France U20	5	(0)
2023–	France U23	10	(0)
2024–	France	6	(0)
Medal record
Women's football
Representing France
UEFA Women's Nations League
Third place	2025
- * Club domestic league appearances and goals as of 18 October 2026 ‡ National team caps and goals as of 8 October 2026

Lou Valérie Bogaert (born 25 June 2004) is a French professional footballer who plays as a left-back for Frauen-Bundesliga club VfL Wolfsburg and the France national team.

== Club career ==
Bogaert is a youth academy graduate of Lille. She made her senior team debut for Lille on 3 October 2021 in a 3–1 league win against Brest. On 13 March 2022, she scored her first goal for the club in a 1–1 draw against Nantes.

On 1 July 2022, Paris FC announced the signing of Bogaert on a three-year deal until June 2025. In February 2024, she extended her contract with the club until June 2027.

On 17 July 2026, Bogaert joined German club VfL Wolfsburg on a three-year contract until June 2029. She scored her first goal for the club on 30 September 2026 in a 2–0 win against Sturm Graz in the UEFA Women's Europa Cup.

== International career ==
Bogaert has represented France at various youth levels. She was part of the French squad at the 2022 FIFA U-20 Women's World Cup and the 2023 UEFA Women's Under-19 Championship.

Bogaert received her first call-up to the France national team in October 2024. She made her debut on 29 October 2024 in a 2–1 defeat to Switzerland. In June 2025, she was named in the French squad for the UEFA Women's Euro 2025.

== Personal life ==
Bogaert's father played as a goalkeeper for an amateur club in France. Growing up, Bogaert's footballing idols were Marcelo and Eden Hazard.

== Career statistics ==
=== Club ===
As of match played 18 October 2026

Appearances and goals by club, season and competition
Club	Season	League			National cup		League cup		Continental		Other		Total	
Club	Season	Division	Apps	Goals	Apps	Goals	Apps	Goals	Apps	Goals	Apps	Goals	Apps	Goals
Lille	2021–22	Seconde Ligue	15	2	5	0	—		—		—		20	2
Paris FC	2022–23	Première Ligue	3	0	0	0	—		0	0	—		3	0
Paris FC	2023–24	Première Ligue	16	0	4	0	—		10 (Note: Appearances in UEFA Women's Champions League)	0	2 (Note: Appearance(s) in playoffs)	0	32	0
Paris FC	2024–25	Première Ligue	20	0	5	0	—		4	0	1	0	30	0
Paris FC	2025–26	Première Ligue	22	3	3	0	1	0	10	0	2	0	38	3
Paris FC	Total		61	3	12	0	1	0	24	0	5	0	103	3
VfL Wolfsburg	2026–27	Frauen-Bundesliga	4	0	1	0	—		3 (Note: One appearance in UEFA Women's Champions League; two appearances and a goal in UEFA Women's Europa Cup)	1	1 (Note: Appearance in DFB-Supercup Frauen)	0	9	1
Career total			80	5	18	0	1	0	27	1	6	0	132	6

=== International ===
As of match played 13 July 2025

Appearances and goals by national team and year
National team	Year	Apps	Goals
France	2024	2	0
France	2025	4	0
France	2026	0	0
Total		6	0

== Honours ==
Paris FC

- Coupe de France Féminine: 2024–25
