= Melissa Friedrich =

Association football player

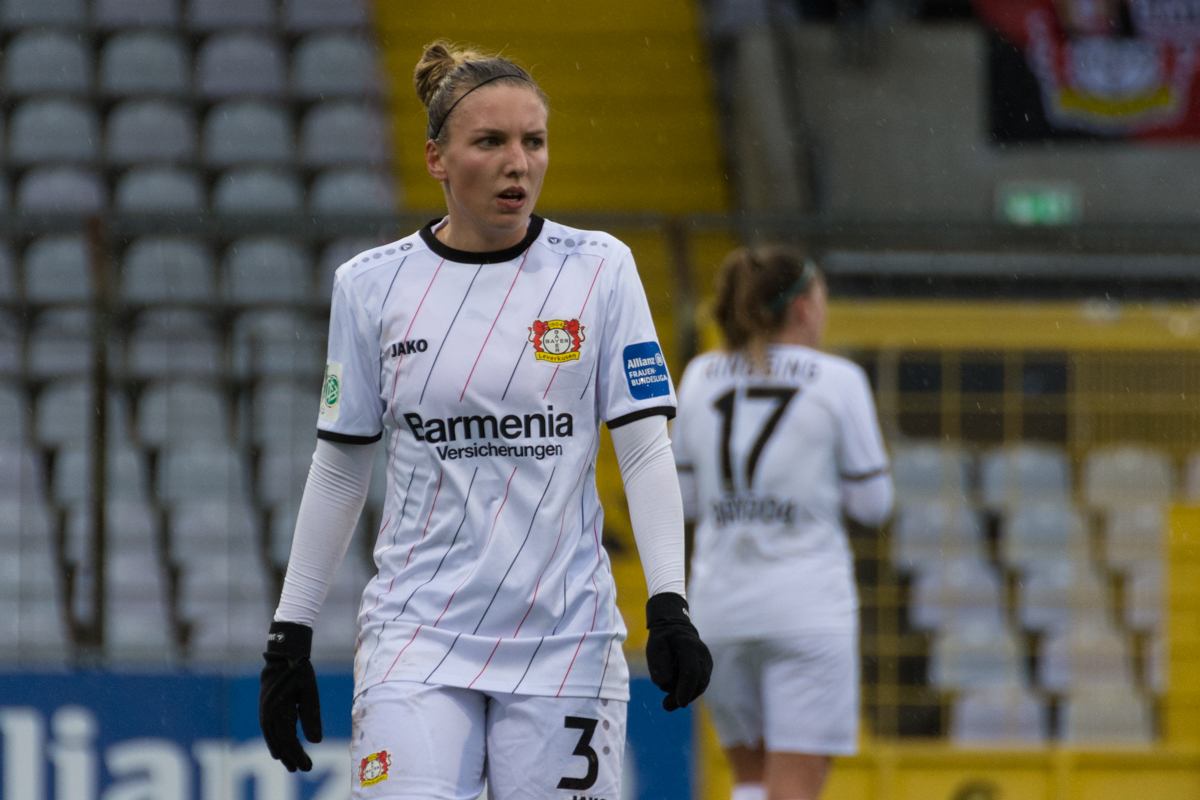

Personal information
- Date of birth: 6 May 1997 (age 29)
- Place of birth: Guxhagen, Germany
- Height: 1.72 m (5 ft 8 in)

Team information
- Current team: Bayer 04 Leverkusen
- Number: 3

Senior career*
Years	Team	Apps	(Gls)
2014–2016	1. FFC Frankfurt	1	(0)
2016–	Bayer 04 Leverkusen	103	(3)

International career
2013	Germany U16	2	(0)
2013–2014	Germany U17	2	(0)
2015–2016	Germany U19	7	(0)
2016	Germany U20	1	(0)
- * Club domestic league appearances and goals as of 23 April 2026

Melissa Friedrich (born 6 May 1997) is a German footballer who plays as a midfielder for Bayer 04 Leverkusen.

== Personal life ==
Melissa Friedrich is the sister of professional footballer Marvin Friedrich.
