= Smilla Vallotto =

Swiss footballer (born 2004)

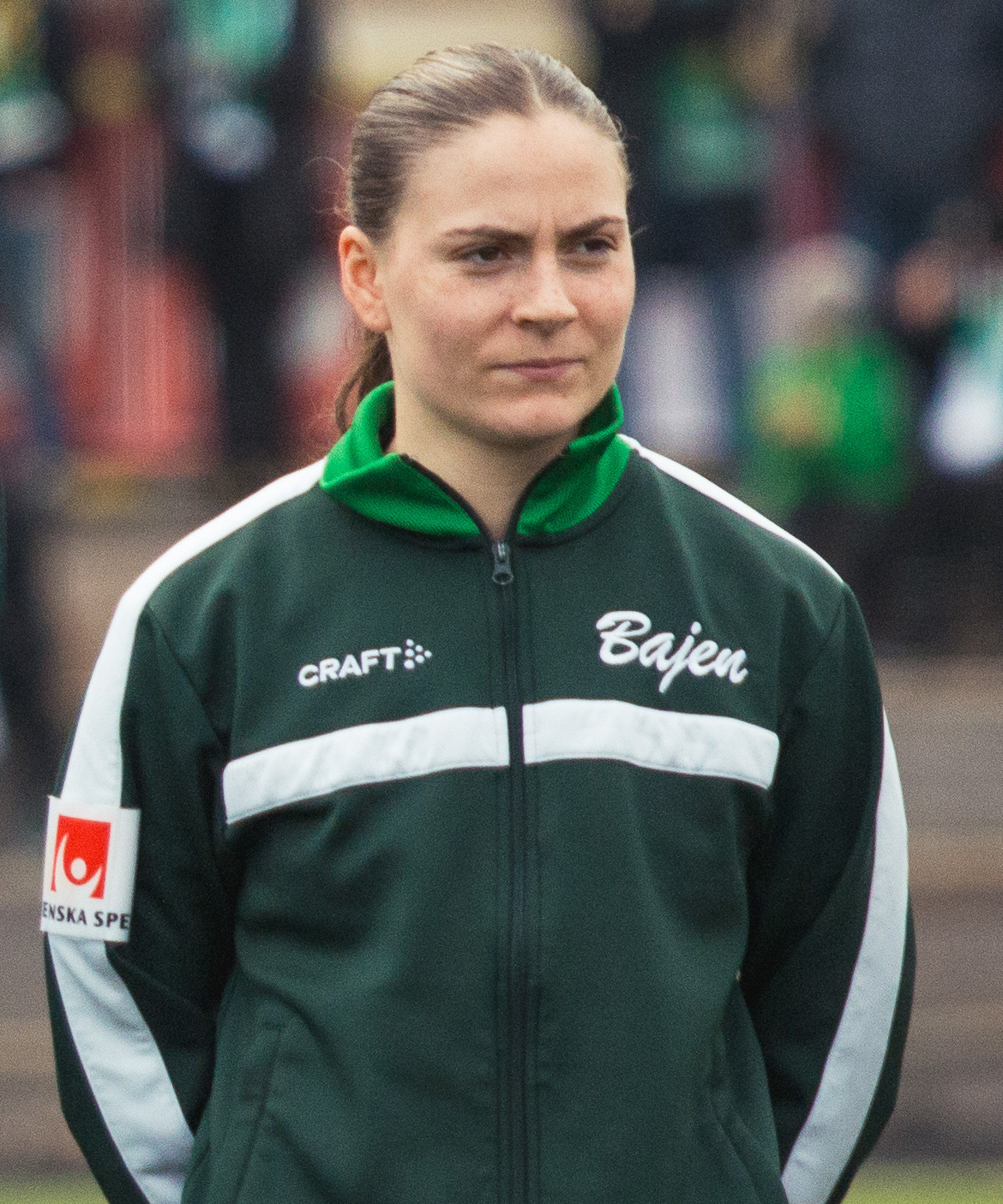
- Vallotto with Hammarby in 2025

Personal information
- Date of birth: 23 March 2004 (age 22)
- Place of birth: Geneva, Switzerland
- Height: 1.72 m (5 ft 8 in)
- Position: Central midfielder

Team information
- Current team: VfL Wolfsburg
- Number: 14

Youth career
- Forus og Gausel
- Hinna
- 2016–2020: Viking
- 2020–2021: Stabæk

Senior career*
| Years | Team | Apps | (Gls) |
| 2019 | Viking | 6 | (1) |
| 2021–2023 | Stabæk | 44 | (2) |
| 2023–2025 | Hammarby | 47 | (7) |
| 2025– | VfL Wolfsburg | 21 | (4) |
| 2025– | VfL Wolfsburg II | 1 | (0) |

International career^{‡}
| 2021–2023 | Switzerland U19 | 17 | (6) |
| 2023– | Switzerland | 34 | (4) |
- * Club domestic league appearances and goals as of 22 November 2026 ‡ National team caps and goals as of 14 October 2026

Smilla Vallotto (born 23 March 2004) is a Swiss professional footballer who plays as a midfielder for Frauen-Bundesliga club VfL Wolfsburg and the Switzerland national team.

== Early life ==
Vallotto was born in Geneva, Switzerland, to a Swiss-Italian father and Norwegian mother. She grew up in the Norwegian city of Stavanger, being able to speak four languages. Vallotto played youth football with local clubs Forus og Gausel IL and Hinna IL, before moving to Viking.

== Club career ==
=== Viking and Stabæk ===
In 2019, Vallotto made her debut in senior football for Viking in the Second Division, the domestic third tier. She made six league appearances for the club at age 15, being regarded as a prospect.

Ahead of the 2020 season, Vallotto moved to Stabæk. On 3 July 2021, she made her debut in Toppserien, the domestic top tier, in a 0–4 loss against LSK. In 2022, Vallotto established herself as an important player for Stabæk, that finished 4th in the table.

=== Hammarby IF ===
On 16 August 2023, Vallotto transferred to Hammarby IF in the Swedish Damallsvenskan, signing a two-and-a-half-year contract. On 1 September, she made her debut for the club in a 3–0 away win against Växjö DFF, coming on as a substitute and scoring the last goal of the game. The club won the 2023 Damallsvenskan, claiming its second Swedish championship after 38 years, with Vallotto making nine league appearances.

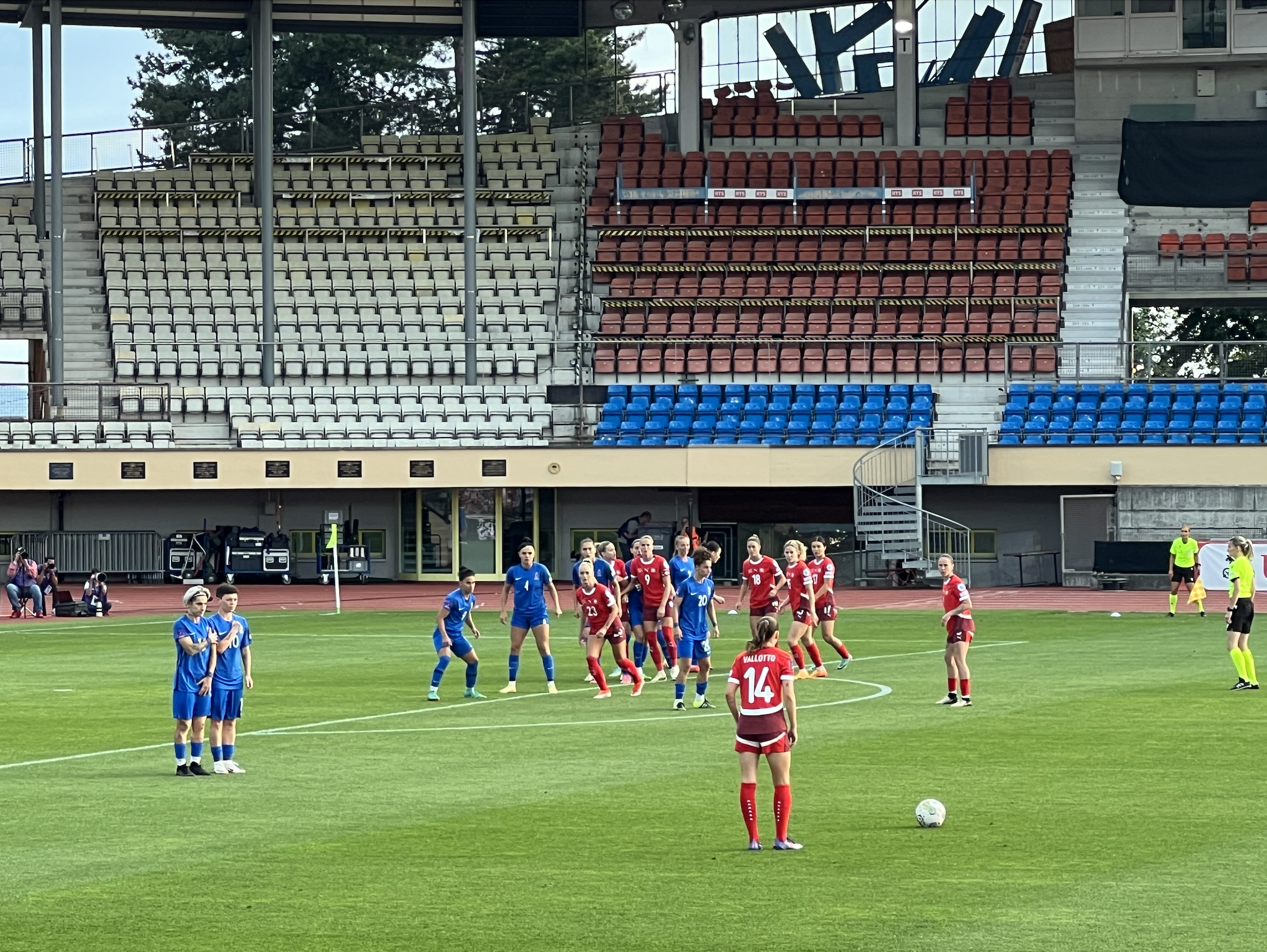
Vallotto getting ready for a free kick against Azerbaijan in Lausanne in July 2024.

== International career ==
She was eligible to represent Switzerland, Italy, and Norway internationally. In 2023, Vallotto made her debut for the Switzerland national team.

On 23 June 2025, Vallotto was called up to the Switzerland squad for the UEFA Women's Euro 2025.

== Style of play ==
Vallotto mainly operates as a midfielder and is known for her ability to create attacking opportunities.

== Career statistics ==
=== International ===
As of match played 13 October 2026

Appearances and goals by national team and year
| National team | Year | Apps | Goals |
|---|---|---|---|
| Switzerland | 2023 | 5 | 0 |
| Switzerland | 2024 | 11 | 1 |
| Switzerland | 2025 | 14 | 3 |
| Switzerland | 2026 | 4 | 0 |
| Total | | 34 | 4 |

Scores and results list Switzerland's goal tally first, score column indicates score after each Vallotto goal.

List of international goals scored by Smilla Vallotto
| No. | Date | Venue | Opponent | Score | Result | Competition |
|---|---|---|---|---|---|---|
| 1 | 9 April 2024 | Dalga Arena, Baku, Azerbaijan | Azerbaijan | 1–0 | 4–0 | 2025 UEFA Women's Euro qualification |
| 2 | 8 April 2025 | Valbjarnarvöllur, Reykjavík, Iceland | Iceland | 2–0 | 3–3 | 2025 UEFA Women's Nations League |
| 3 | 26 June 2025 | Stadion Schützenwiese, Winterthur, Switzerland | Czech Republic | 3–1 | 4–1 | Friendly |
| 4 | 28 October 2025 | East End Park, Dunfermline, Scotland | Scotland | 4–2 | 4–2 | Friendly |
| 5 | 9 June 2026 | Mourneview Park, Lurgan, Northern Ireland | Northern Ireland | 2–0 | 2–1 | 2027 FIFA Women's World Cup qualification |

== Honours ==
Hammarby IF

- Svenska Cupen: 2022–23
- Damallsvenskan: 2023
