= Selina Ostermeier =

German footballer (born 1999)

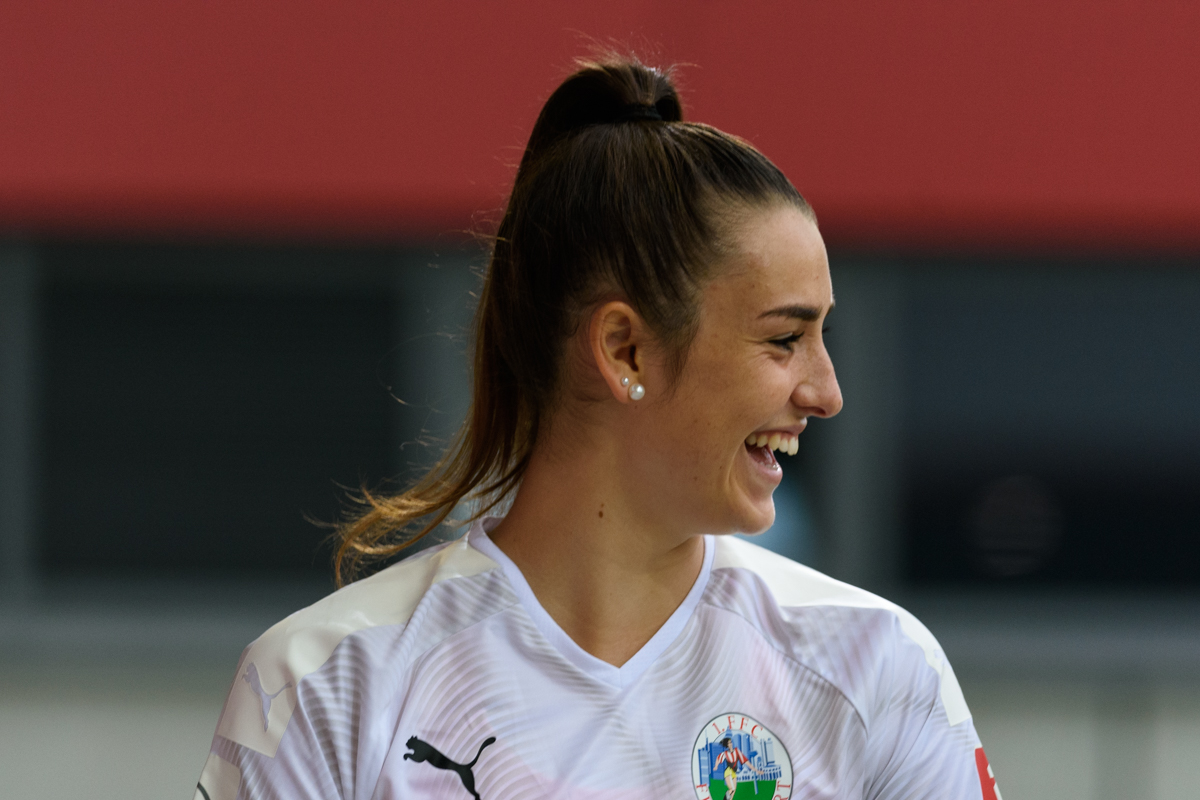

Personal information
- Full name: Selina Marie Ostermeier
- Date of birth: 15 January 1999 (age 27)
- Place of birth: Rosenheim, Germany
- Height: 1.77 m (5 ft 10 in)
- Position: Defender

Team information
- Current team: Bayer Leverkusen
- Number: 2

Senior career*
Years	Team	Apps	(Gls)
2016–2020	1. FFC Frankfurt	1	(0)
2020–2022	SGS Essen	39	(2)
2022–	Bayer Leverkusen	81	(3)

International career^{‡}
2024–	Germany U23	12	(0)
- * Club domestic league appearances and goals as of 20 November 2026 ‡ National team caps and goals as of 9 June 2026

Selina Marie Ostermeier (born 15 January 1999) is a German footballer who plays as a defender for Bayer 04 Leverkusen.
