= Lieske Carleer =

Dutch footballer (born 2001)

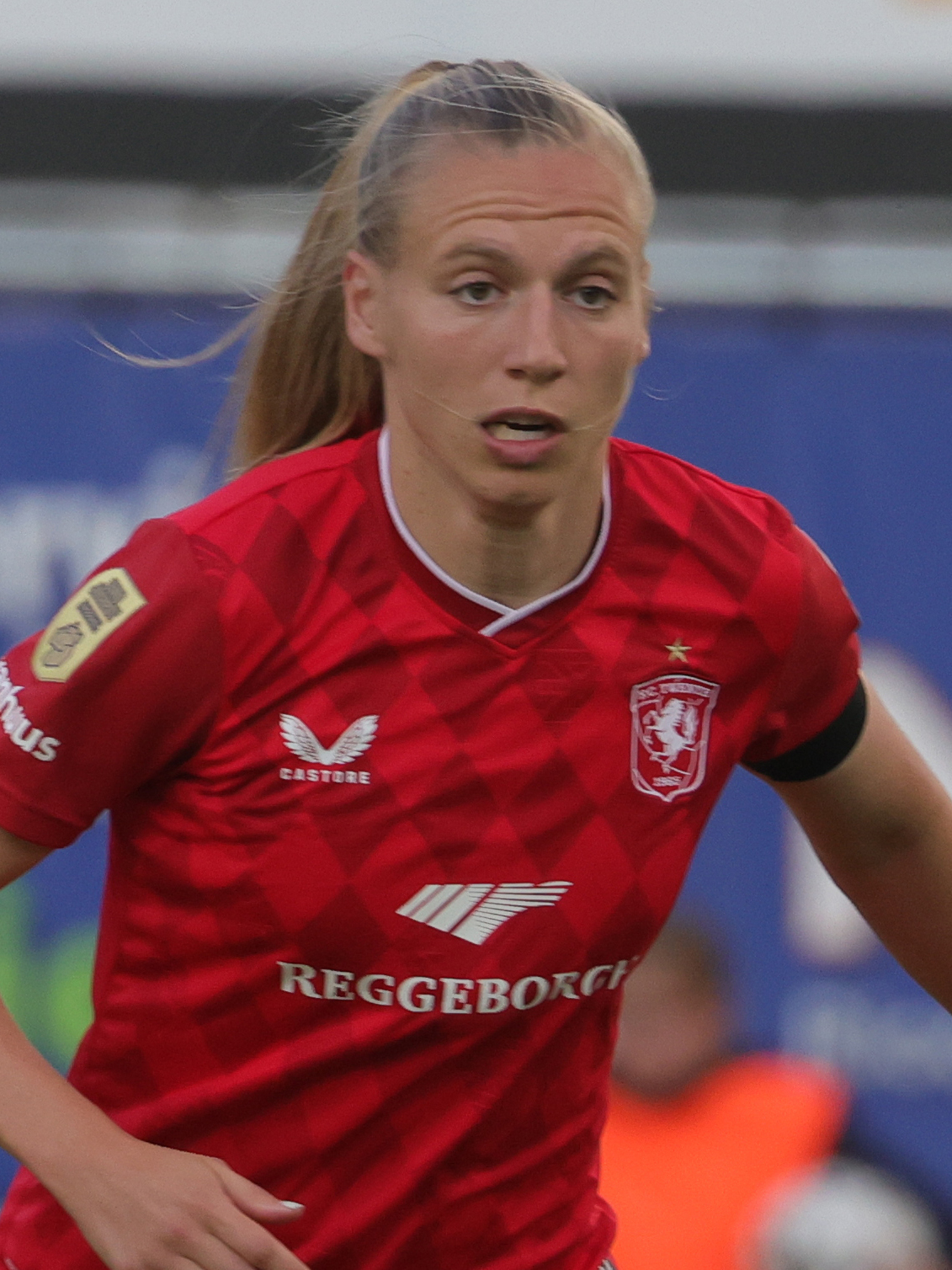
- Carleer with FC Twente in 2025

Personal information
- Full name: Lieske Carleer
- Date of birth: 16 April 2001 (age 25)
- Place of birth: Winterswijk, Netherlands
- Height: 1.75 m (5 ft 9 in)
- Position: Centre-back

Team information
- Current team: VfL Wolfsburg
- Number: 3

Youth career
- FC Trias
- FC Twente
- CTO Eindhoven

College career
Years	Team	Apps	(Gls)
2019–2023	Arizona State Sun Devils	81	(2)

Senior career*
Years	Team	Apps	(Gls)
2024–2026	FC Twente	40	(2)
2026–	VfL Wolfsburg	10	(0)

International career^{‡}
2017–2018	Netherlands U17	14	(0)
2019	Netherlands U19	14	(2)
2025–	Netherlands	2	(0)
- * Club domestic league appearances and goals as of 20:35, 22 November 2026 (UTC) ‡ National team caps and goals as of 17:36, 12 July 2026 (UTC)

Lieske Carleer (born 16 April 2001) is a Dutch professional footballer who plays as a centre-back for Frauen-Bundesliga club VfL Wolfsburg and the Netherlands national team. She played college soccer in the United States for the Arizona State Sun Devils, where she was a two-time All-Pac-12 selection. She has also previously played for Eredivisie club FC Twente.

== Early life ==
Carleer was born and raised in Winterswijk, Netherlands. She is one of three children born to former professional ice skaters Bart Carleer and Grietje Mulder. She started her footballing career at FC Trias before also joining FC Twente's youth academy. She spent a portion of her youth splitting time between both teams, often attending matches and trainings on alternate days for the respective clubs. She was forced to leave FC Twente after three years due to the club shutting down its girls academy. At age 15, Carleer moved to Eindhoven to play at the CTO Eindhoven regional training center. In 2018, Nederlandse Omroep Stichting named Carleer one of the twenty greatest under-20 talents in the Netherlands.

== College career ==
When Carleer was 16 years old, she was invited to visit Arizona State University after the Arizona State Sun Devils women's soccer coach took notice of her at the Under-17 European Championship. She moved to the United States in 2019, slotting into a Sun Devils backline that had had three starters graduate the previous year. In her freshman season, Carleer started in all 17 of her appearances and also recorded 2 assists. In the following season, which was delayed to the spring of 2021 due to the COVID-19 pandemic, she earned second team All-Pac-12 honors after contributing to a strong defensive year in which Arizona State only allowed six goals across its opening nine matches.

In the 2021 fall season, Carleer played the entirety of 8 games and also earned her first-ever Pac-12 Defensive Player of the Week award in August after performing well against Mississippi State and UAB. As a senior in 2022, she started 12 consecutive matches before missing the final 8 of the season due to injury. Carleer then returned to Arizona State for a fifth year, taking advantage of the pandemic-induced extra year of NCAA eligibility offered to athletes while also pursuing a master's degree. It was in this season that she earned Pac-12 second team honors for the second time.

== Club career ==
=== FC Twente ===
Near the end of her Arizona State career, Carleer reached out to her former youth club, FC Twente. After being followed by Twente for the next six months, Carleer officially signed her first professional contract with the club in January 2024, penning a one-and-a-half-year deal. She made her Eredivisie debut on 4 February 2024, coming on as a substitute for Sophie te Brake in a 5–2 victory over Excelsior Rotterdam. She went on to help Twente win the Eredivisie title, the KNVB Women's Cup, and the Eredivisie Cup. In the Eredivisie Cup final, she scored the stoppage-time game-winner to lift Twente to a 3–2 win over PSV.

The following season, Carleer contributed to yet another Eredivisie title. She set personal career highs, starting in all 21 of her appearances, scoring 2 goals, and tallying 2 assists. On 25 March 2025, she re-signed with FC Twente on a new contract lasting until the summer of 2027. Carleer, though, would end up departing from Twente early, moving away from the club in July 2026. She tallied 72 total appearances for Twente across all competitions, as well as six different titles. She also gained UEFA Women's Champions League experience while at Twente.

=== VfL Wolfsburg ===
On 9 July 2026, German Frauen-Bundesliga club VfL Wolfsburg announced that they had acquired Carleer on a transfer from Twente and signed her to a three-year contract until 2029. The move reunited Carleer with former Twente teammate Ella Peddemors.

== International career ==
Carleer started her international career with the Netherlands U17 national team, eventually captaining the side. In 2018, she was included in the squad that competed in the UEFA Under-17 European Championship. Carleer then moved up to the under-19s and participated in the 2019 UEFA Women's Under-19 Championship, in which the Netherlands made it to the semifinals before being eliminated by Germany.

Carleer received her first call-up to the Netherlands senior national team in October 2025, as a member of the first-ever Oranje squad selected by newly appointed manager Arjan Veurink. She was an unused substitute in both of the Netherlands' friendly matches that window, first against Poland and then against Canada. On 28 November 2025, Carleer made her senior international debut, subbing on in a 2–1 victory over Portugal.

== Honors and awards ==
FC Twente

- Vrouwen Eredivisie: 2023–24, 2024–25
- KNVB Women's Cup: 2024–25, 2025–26
- Eredivisie Cup: 2023–24
- Dutch Women's Super Cup: 2024, 2025

Individual

- Second-team All-Pac-12: 2020, 2023
