= Carolin Schraa =

German footballer

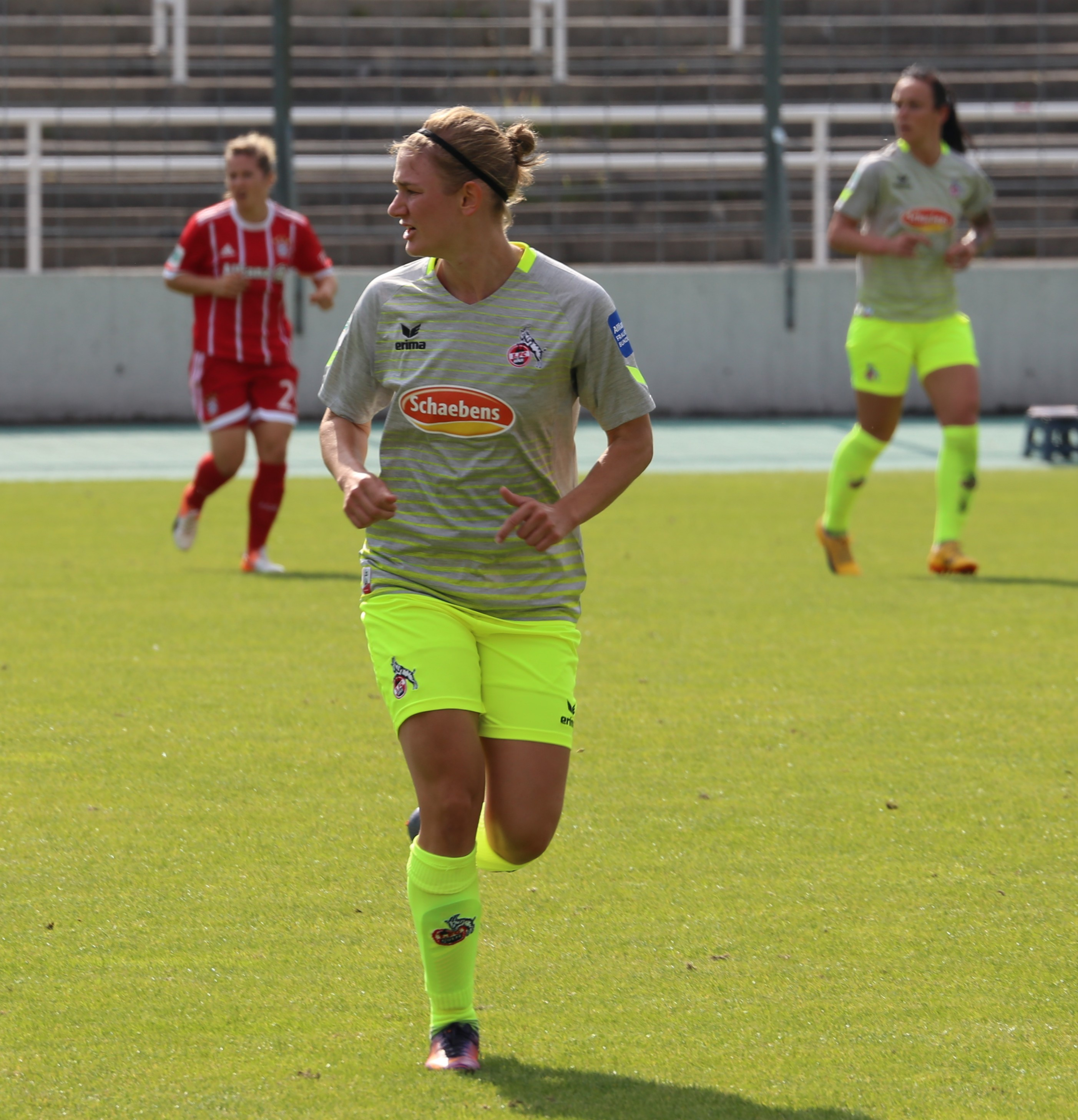

Personal information
- Date of birth: 6 September 1991 (age 35)
- Position: Forward

Carolin Schraa (born 6 September 1991) is a German footballer who plays as a forward who has played for 1. FC Köln. As of 2022 Schraa plays for SG 99 Andernach.

== Career ==
Schraa most recently played in the senior division for Sportfreunde Ippendorf – a club from the Bonn district of the same name – for whom she played from 2011 to 2016 in the Landesliga Mittelrhein and subsequently in the Mittelrheinliga, appearing in 83 league matches and scoring 120 goals.

For the 2016/17 season, she was signed by 1. FC Köln, for whom she played in her first season in the South group of the then two-division 2. Bundesliga, appearing in 21 league matches and scoring 14 goals. Due to the fact that the champions, the second team of TSG 1899 Hoffenheim, were not eligible for promotion because their first team was already in the Bundesliga, she and her second-placed team were promoted to the top flight.

She made her Bundesliga debut on September 3, 2021 (matchday 1) in the 0-2 away defeat against 1. FFC Frankfurt.Her first goal didn't take long to come; she scored it on matchday 2, six days later, in the 2-5 home defeat against SGS Essen, making it 1-3 in the 79th minute. It remained her only goal in 13 league appearances. At the end of the season, 11th place in a league of 12 teams was not enough to avoid relegation, and so she accompanied her team to the single-division 2. Bundesliga, from which they returned to the Bundesliga after she scored twelve goals in all 26 league matches – once again due to the fact that the two clubs above them in the table were not eligible for promotion, as their first teams were already represented in the top flight.
