= Vanessa Bernauer =

Swiss footballer (born 1988)

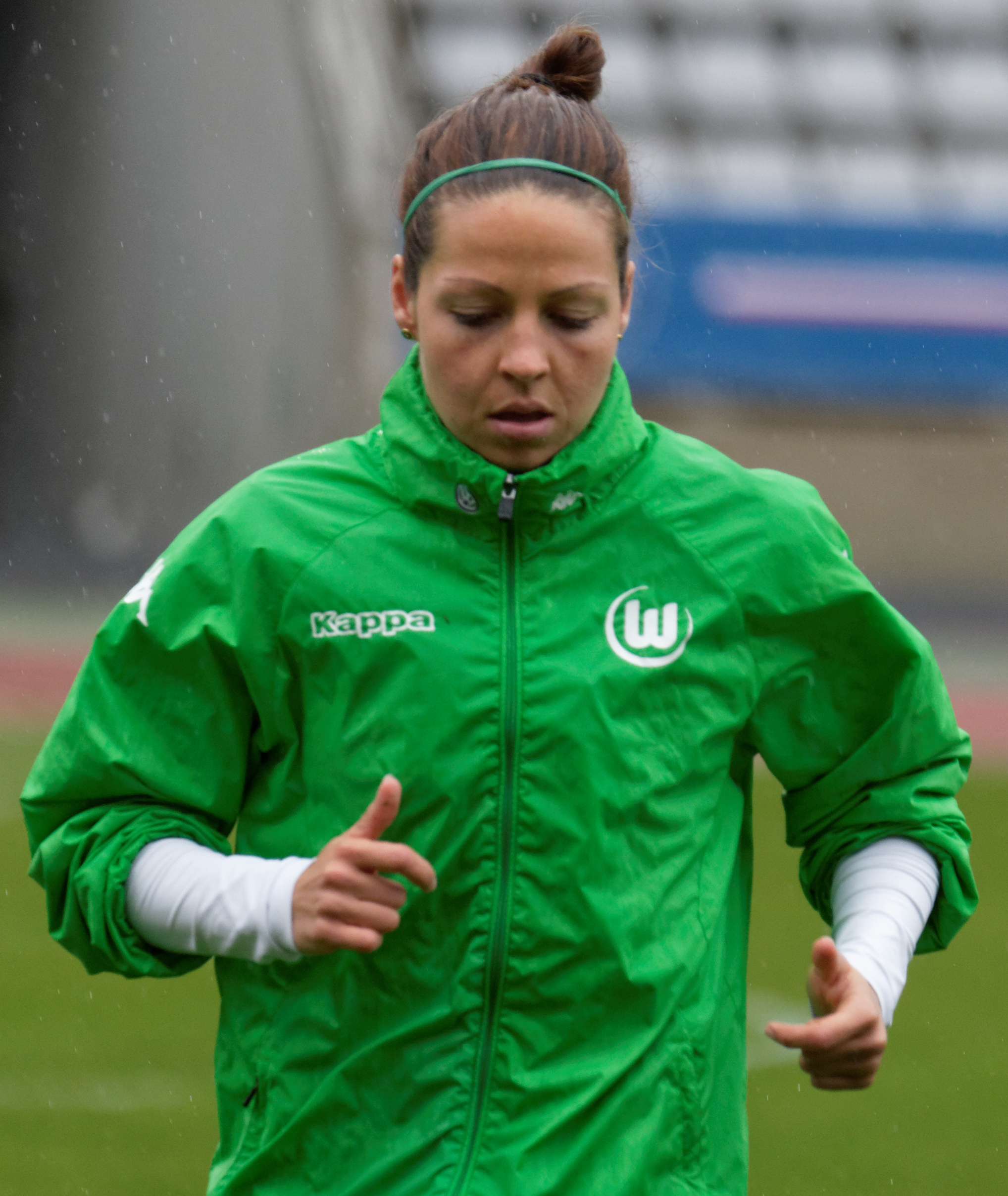
- Bernauer with Wolfsburg in 2015

Personal information
- Full name: Vanessa Bernauer
- Date of birth: 23 March 1988 (age 38)
- Place of birth: Zürich, Switzerland
- Height: 1.69 m (5 ft 7 in)
- Position: Midfielder

Youth career
- 1998–2003: FC Bulach

Senior career*
Years	Team	Apps	(Gls)
2003–2010	Zürich		
2010–2013	Levante	59	(9)
2013–2014	Cloppenburg	22	(5)
2014–2018	Wolfsburg	56	(12)
2018–2022	Roma	60	(5)
2022–2024	Zürich	36	(2)

International career^{‡}
- Switzerland U19
2006–2022	Switzerland	91	(7)
- * Club domestic league appearances and goals as of 17 August 2024 (UTC) ‡ National team caps and goals as of 17 August 2024 (UTC)

Vanessa Bernauer (born 23 March 1988) is a Swiss former footballer who played as a midfielder. She played for VfL Wolfsburg and BV Cloppenburg of the Frauen-Bundesliga, FC Zürich in Switzerland's Nationalliga A and Levante UD in Spain's Primera División.

== Club career ==
In Germany, Bernauer caught the attention of several clubs around the Bundesliga by scoring a 45-yard goal for Cloppenburg against Munich. Her performances with Cloppenburg would earn the admiration of major club Wolfsburg, who signed Bernauer in 2014.

At Wolfsburg, Bernauer would go on to win one league title and three German cups. In Europe, Bernauer would reach two Champions League finals and one semi-final during her stay with the club. The 2016 Champions League final saw Bernauer substituted in the 73rd minute, meaning she missed out on the chance to take a penalty in Wolfsburg's eventual shootout defeat to Lyon. The 2018 Champions League final saw Bernauer miss the game after picking up a major knee injury in the spring of 2018, while on international duty with Switzerland.

Wolfsburg decided to let Bernauer go while the midfielder was recovering from a major knee injury, so Bernauer then signed for A.S. Roma in the summer of 2018. Her first season with the Italian club saw Bernauer played in an advanced midfield role, but she struggled to meet expectations as the veteran playmaker of a young Roma team. The Italian club then made a series of high-profile midfield signings in the summer of 2019, but chose to keep Bernauer at the club. That meant Bernauer got to play among more experienced teammates during the 2019–20 Serie A season.

Among those new teammates was the major signing of midfielder Manuela Giugliano, for who Bernauer agreed to give up the Roma number 10 jersey at the club. Bernauer then took the Roma number 5 shirt and settled into a new role as a ball-winning midfielder, finding consistency and good form from 2019 onwards. In Bernauer's third season with Roma, and just five years after she had missed out on the chance to take a penalty in Wolfburg's Champions League final loss, Bernauer stepped up to score the winning penalty in Roma's shootout victory over AC Milan in the 2021 Coppa Italia final. On 20 July 2021, Bernauer signed a contract extension that tied her to Roma until the summer of 2022.

In 2022 Bernauer returned to Switzerland to play once again for FC Zürich where she started her senior career in 2003. Beside qualifying for the group stage of the UEFA Women's Champions League, she also won her fourth and final Swiss championship as a player with FCZ in June 2023.

After another season in Zürich, Bernauer officially announced her retirement as a player on 20 September 2024.

== International career ==
In her career Bernauer achieved 91 caps and 7 goals for the Swiss national team after debuting in February 2006. She appeared for her country at the 2015 FIFA Women's World Cup and at UEFA Women's Euro 2017, while she was also part of the Switzerland squad that won the 2017 Cyprus Cup.

In April 2021, Bernauer was part of the Switzerland squad that qualified for the UEFA Women's Euro 2022 tournament via the playoffs.

== Style of play ==
Vanessa Bernauer is a tough-tackling midfielder, who frequently recovers the ball for her team and plays a key role in attacking transition. She retains the vision and ability to find a key pass anywhere inside the opposition half, as well as holding a potent shot that can make Bernauer a long-range goal threat. Bernauer is able to carry out any number of creative or defensive roles in midfield.

== Honours ==
FC Zürich

- Nationalliga A: Winner (4) 2007–2008, 2008–2009, 2009–2010, 2022-2023
- Swiss Women's Cup: Winner (1) 2006–2007

Levante UD

- COTIF: Winner (3) 2011, 2012, 2013
- Pyrénées Cup: Winner (1) 2012
- Sport Mundi Tournament: Winner (1) 2010

Wfl Wolfsburg

- Bundesliga: Winner (2) 2016–2017, 2017–2018
- DFB Pokal: Winner (4) 2014–2015, 2015–2016, 2016–2017, 2017–2018

Roma

- Coppa Italia: Winner (1) 2020–21
