= Martina Tufekovic =

German-Croatian footballer (born 1994)

Martina Tufeković
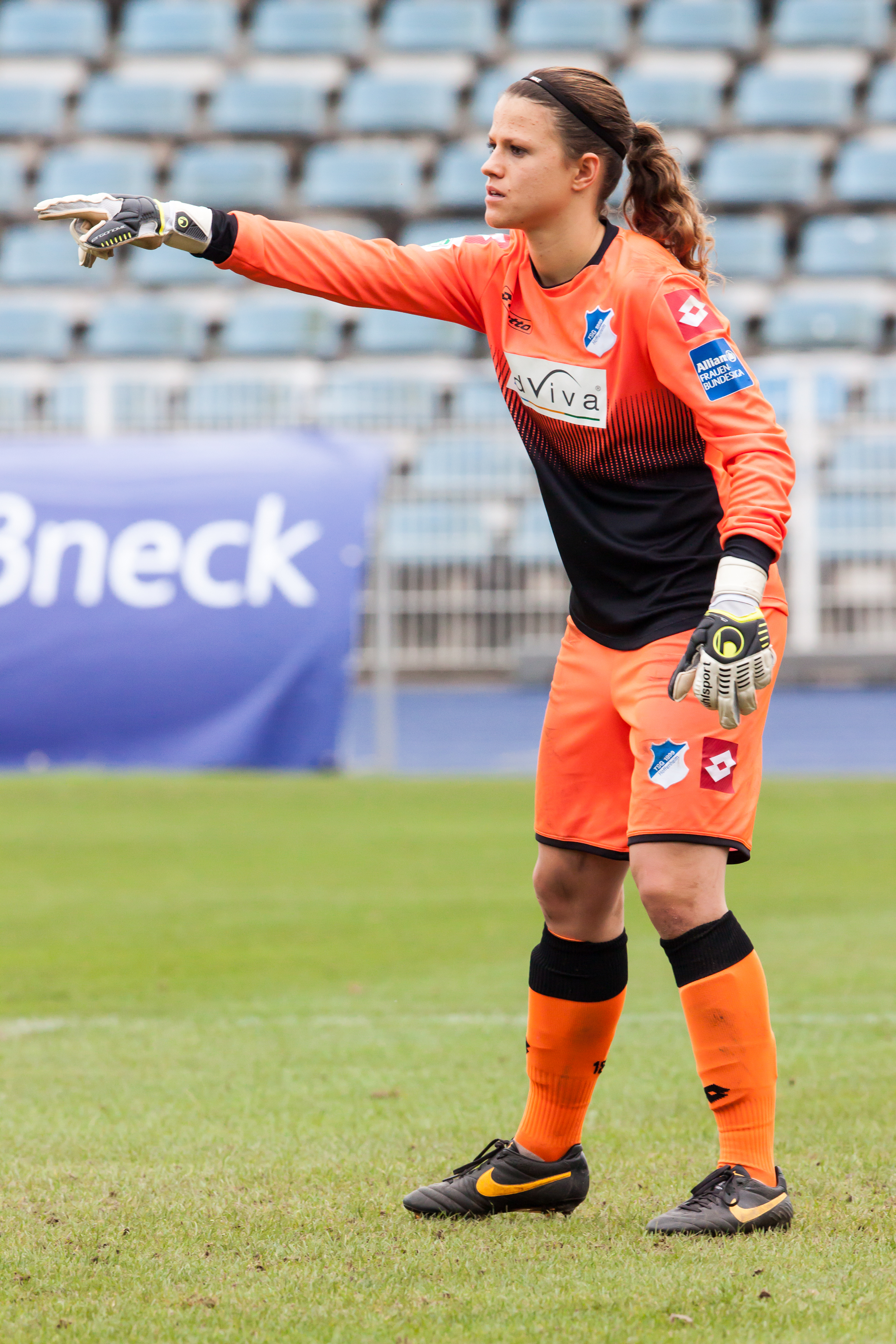
- Tufeković in 2014

Personal information
- Date of birth: 16 July 1994 (age 32)
- Place of birth: Heilbronn, Germany
- Height: 1.69 m (5 ft 7 in)
- Position: Goalkeeper

Team information
- Current team: VfL Wolfsburg
- Number: 21

Youth career
- 2004–2008: VfL Obereisesheim
- 2008–2010: TSG Hoffenheim

Senior career*
Years	Team	Apps	(Gls)
2012–2025	TSG Hoffenheim	133	(0)
2018–2019	TSG Hoffenheim II	3	(0)
2025–	VfL Wolfsburg	0	(0)
- * Club domestic league appearances and goals as of 20:27, 9 September 2025 (UTC)

Martina Tufekovic (Croatian: Tufeković; born 16 July 1994) is a German-Croatian footballer who plays as a goalkeeper for Frauen-Bundesliga club VfL Wolfsburg.

== Club career ==
Tufeković began her career in 2004 as a field-playing all-rounder in the male F youth team at VfL Obereisesheim. During this time she attended the sports school Ruit in Ostfildern in addition to her active football career. In 2009, she moved from Obereisesheim to the youth team at TSG 1899 Hoffenheim and retrained as a goalkeeper. A year later, at the age of 17, she moved up to the senior team, where she was a substitute goalkeeper in the 2nd Bundesliga. She did not play in her first season and was on the bench as a substitute goalkeeper in four games. On the 18th day of the 2nd Bundesliga season 2011/12, she made her senior debut on 15 April 2012 against 1. FC Köln. She played in four more games through the end of the 2012 season before going back to the second team in September 2012. Due to injuries, Tufeković only played in six games for the reserve in the Regionalliga Süd. After the 2012/13 season, the first team was promoted to the Bundesliga and so they made their debut in the top female division on 13 April 2014 against 1. FFC Turbine Potsdam.

== International career ==
Tufeković has been in the extended squad for the Croatia national team since 2012. There she plays together with the substitute goalkeeper of the second team of TSG 1899 Hoffenheim Nicole Vuk. In 2021 Tufeković was called up for the first time to the German national team. For the 2022 European Championship in England, she was not on the squad but was available on call.

== Awards ==
In January 2012, she was nominated alongside Duje Dragun Pende (SV Wehen Wiesbaden) and Marko Mićanovic (SC Wiener Neustadt) in the election of the Večernjakova domovnica home prize in the football category of the best junior sportswomen outside of Croatia. At the final award ceremony on 17 March 2012 in the Landgraf-Friedrich-Saal Kurhaus & Kurtheater in Bad Homburg, she was eighth in the junior athlete category.
