= Stina Johannes =

German association football player

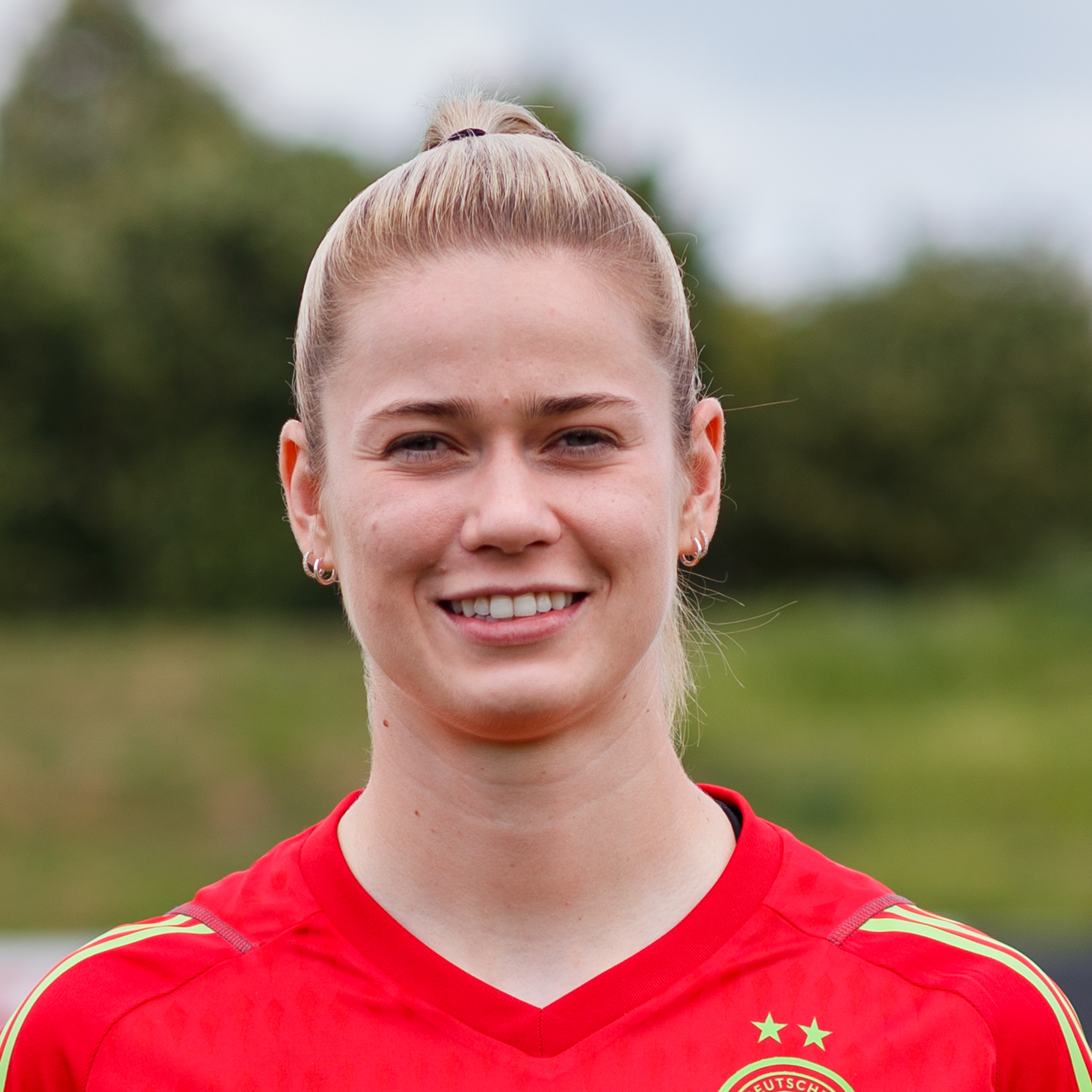
- Johannes with Germany in 2023

Personal information
- Full name: Stina Johannes
- Date of birth: 23 January 2000 (age 26)
- Place of birth: Hanover, Germany
- Height: 1.77 m (5 ft 10 in)
- Position: Goalkeeper

Team information
- Current team: VfL Wolfsburg
- Number: 1

Youth career
- 2007–2015: Heesseler SV
- 2015–2016: Hanoverian SC
- 2016–2017: FF UPS Jena

Senior career*
| Years | Team | Apps | (Gls) |
| 2016–2018 | USV Jena II | 11 | (0) |
| 2016–2018 | USV Jena | 1 | (0) |
| 2018–2022 | SGS Essen | 29 | (0) |
| 2022 | INAC Kobe Leonessa | 1 | (0) |
| 2022–2025 | Eintracht Frankfurt | 65 | (0) |
| 2025– | VfL Wolfsburg | 33 | (0) |

International career^{‡}
| 2014–2015 | Germany U15 | 3 | (0) |
| 2015 | Germany U16 | 2 | (0) |
| 2017 | Germany U17 | 6 | (0) |
| 2018 | Germany U19 | 7 | (0) |
| 2023– | Germany | 5 | (0) |
Medal record
UEFA Women's Nations League
| Bronze medal – third place | 2024 France–Netherlands–Spain |
- * Club domestic league appearances and goals as of 20:30, 22 November 2026 (UTC) ‡ National team caps and goals as of 17:52, 31 October 2025 (UTC)

Stina Johannes (born 23 January 2000) is a German professional footballer who plays as a goalkeeper for Frauen-Bundesliga club VfL Wolfsburg and the Germany national team.

== Club career ==
Johannes grew up in Burgdorf in the Hanover Region of Lower Saxony. At the age of seven she moved to Heesseler SV and played for eight years in the corresponding boys' teams. In 2015 she went to Hannoverscher SC. After one season, the male B-Juniors of the HSC had to do without their goalkeeper, because she switched from the Landesliga to FF USV Jena in the Bundesliga in 2016. There she played for the U17 team in the B-Juniorinnen-Bundesliga, but was already training in the women's team. She made her senior debut on 3 September 2017 (1st matchday) in a 4–1 defeat away to 1. FFC Turbine Potsdam with a 39th-minute substitution for Justien Odeurs, who was injured.

Since her last league game on 6 June 2021, she has repeatedly struggled with injuries. In order to practice before she switched to Eintracht Frankfurt for the 2022/23 season and succeeded the departing Merle Frohms, she played for the Japanese first division club INAC Kobe Leonessa for three months. Johannes became Frankfurt's starting goalkeeper during 2022–23, keeping 12 clean sheets in the Bundesliga and helping the team towards a third place finish. She remained an ever-present in the Frankfurt squad in the 2023–24 season, where the team's third place was achieved with seven clean sheets. Her final season at the club, the 2024–25 campaign, became her most statistically successful: Johannes kept a league-high 11 clean sheets, as Frankfurt missed out on second by just one point.

== International career ==
In 2014, Johannes was invited to the Hennef sports school for a DFB course. On 28 October of the same year, she made her international debut for the U15 national team. The game in Glasgow against the hosts of the Scottish U15s was won 13–0 (9–0); so she became Heeßel's first national player. In her second appearance in the national jersey against Belgium on 3 December 2014, she also conceded zero goals.

Johannes became European champion in 2017 with the U17 national team in the Czech Republic. The semi-final, her fifth international match for the U17s, was decided on penalties in which she saved four shots.

Johannes was called up to the Germany squad for the 2023 FIFA Women's World Cup.

She made her senior debut on 4 June 2024, in a UEFA Women's Euro 2025 qualifying match against Poland.

On 3 July 2024, Johannes was called up to the Germany squad for the 2024 Summer Olympics.

On 12 June 2025, Johannes was called up to the Germany squad for the UEFA Women's Euro 2025.

== Career statistics ==
As of 28 October 2025

Appearances and goals by national team and year
| National team | Year | Apps | Goals |
|---|---|---|---|
| Germany | 2024 | 2 | 0 |
| Germany | 2025 | 3 | 0 |
| Total | | 5 | 0 |

== Honours ==
INAC Kobe Leonessa

- WE League: 2021–22

Germany U17

- UEFA Women's Under-17 Championship: 2017

Germany U19

- UEFA Women's Under-19 Championship runner-up: 2018

Germany

- UEFA Women's Nations League third place: 2023–24
