= VfL Wolfsburg (women) =

Association football club in Germany

- Full name: Verein für Leibesübungen Wolfsburg e. V. (Sports club); Verein für Leibesübungen Wolfsburg Fußball GmbH (Professional football club)
- Nickname: Die Wölfinnen (The She-wolves)
- Founded: 2003; 23 years ago
- Stadium: AOK Stadion
- Capacity: 5,200
- Owner: Volkswagen Group
- Sporting director: Vanessa Bernauer
- Head coach: Stephan Lerch
- League: Frauen-Bundesliga
- 2025–26: Bundesliga, 2nd of 14
- Website: vfl-wolfsburg.de/womens
Home colours	Away colours	Third colours

Verein für Leibesübungen Wolfsburg e. V., commonly known as VfL Wolfsburg, is a German professional women's football club based in Wolfsburg, Lower Saxony. The club is currently playing in the top division in Germany, the Bundesliga. The club won the UEFA Women's Champions League in 2013 and 2014.

== History ==
VfR Eintracht Wolfsburg was founded in 1973. The team was a founding member of the Bundesliga. In 2003 the team joined VfL Wolfsburg.

The first season under the new name was in 2003–04, which ended with an eighth place, the next season the team was relegated to the 2nd Bundesliga in 12th place but gained direct promotion in the following 2005–06 season. After a fifth place in 2009–10, Wolfsburg grew up one year later, contending for the title and managed to be runner-up in 2011–12.

In the 2012–13 season Wolfsburg won the UEFA Women's Champions League. Two weeks prior the team achieved its first Bundesliga title. They were the second team, after 1. FFC Frankfurt to complete the treble, by also winning the domestic cup competition. This was the first time that the same year both in men's and women's football, clubs from the same nation, complete the treble, with the men's club being Bayern Munich. They were also the first German football team to successfully defend their Champions League title.

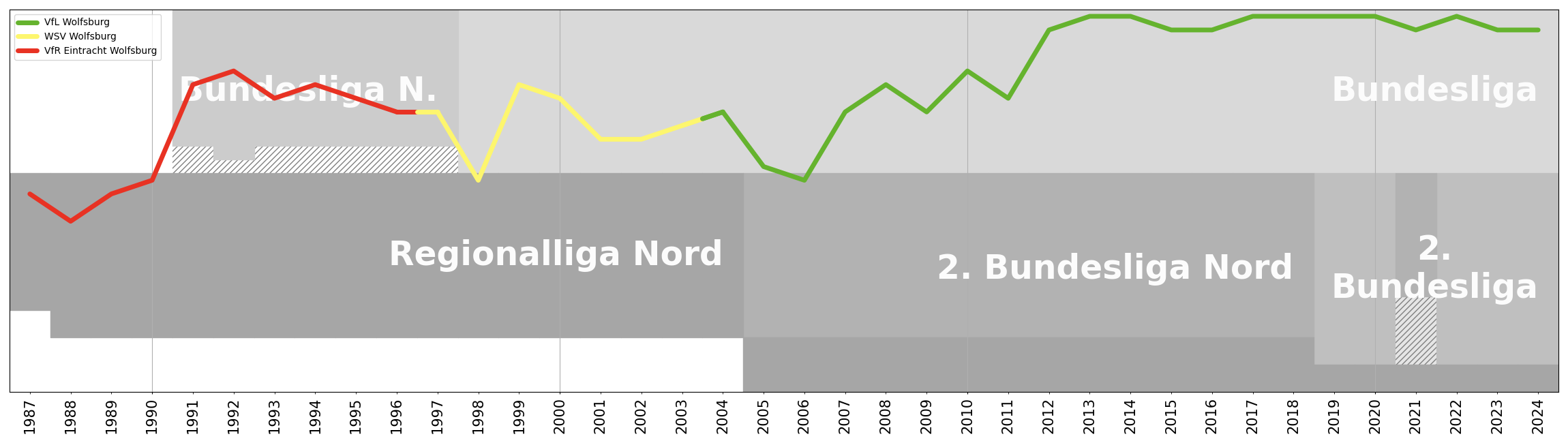
Historical league performance of VfL Wolfsburg

== Players ==
=== Current squad ===
As of 16 August 2026

Note: Flags indicate national team as defined under FIFA eligibility rules; some limited exceptions apply. Players may hold more than one non-FIFA nationality.

No.	Pos.	Nation	Player
1	GK	GER	Stina Johannes
2	DF	NOR	Thea Bjelde
3	DF	NED	Lieske Carleer
4	DF	GER	Sophia Kleinherne
5	MF	NED	Ella Peddemors
6	MF	GER	Janina Minge
7	FW	GER	Giovanna Hoffmann
8	MF	GER	Lena Lattwein
9	FW	SLO	Lara Prašnikar
10	MF	GER	Svenja Huth (captain)
13	FW	DEN	Cecilie Fløe
14	MF	SUI	Smilla Vallotto
15	MF	POL	Weronika Araśniewicz
16	DF	GER	Camilla Küver

No.	Pos.	Nation	Player
17	MF	GER	Katharina Piljić
18	FW	GER	Mara Alber (on loan from Chelsea)
19	FW	FRA	Kessya Bussy
20	DF	GER	Julia Landenberger
21	GK	GER	Martina Tufekovic
22	GK	AUT	Christina Schönwetter
23	DF	FRA	Lou Bogaert
24	DF	GER	Joelle Wedemeyer
28	FW	GER	Cora Zicai
38	FW	NOR	Anny Kerim-Lindland
39	DF	GER	Sarai Linder
40	GK	GER	Ylvi Eisenbeiß
41	FW	NOR	Linnea Sælen

=== Out on loan ===
Note: Flags indicate national team as defined under FIFA eligibility rules; some limited exceptions apply. Players may hold more than one non-FIFA nationality.

No.	Pos.	Nation	Player
—	MF	SWE	Emma Broddheimer (at Carl Zeiss Jena until 30 June 2027)

== Personnel ==
=== Current technical staff ===
As of 7 July 2026

Position	Staff
Head coach	(Germany) Stephan Lerch
Assistant coach	(Germany) Philip Arnold (Netherlands) Carin Bakhuis (Germany) Theresa Panfil
Goalkeeping coaches	(Germany) Marcel Shulz
Individual Trainer	(Netherlands) Oliver Dijk
Athletics Trainer	(Netherlands) Lars Edel
Game Analyst	(Germany) Robin Eder
Team Manager	(Germany) Jessica Bos
Head of youth department	(Switzerland) Lara Dickenmann
Director of professional football	(Switzerland) Vanessa Bernauer
Team Doctors	(Germany) Sebastian Kunz (India) Abhishek Sharma
Physiotherapists	(Germany) Ewa Gehring-Strum (Germany) Lina Peth
Sports Psychologist	(Netherlands) Robin Joostens
Physiotherapy Medical Director	(Germany) Omar Rüppel
Media director	(Germany) Dirk Zilles
Media relations	(Germany) Nils Hoefener
Team official	(Germany) Jörg Schmidt

Last updated: 7 July 2026

== Management ==
=== Board of directors ===
Office	Name
Managing directors	(Germany) Michael Meeske
Managing directors	(Germany) Jörg Schmadtke
Managing directors	(Germany) Tim Schumacher
Sporting director	(Switzerland) Vanessa Bernauer

Last updated: 30 August 2026
Source: Management board

== Honours ==
=== Official ===
- UEFA Women's Champions League:
  - Winners: 2012–13, 2013–14
  - Runners-up: 2015–16, 2017–18, 2019–20, 2022–23
- Frauen-Bundesliga:
  - Winners (7): 2012–13, 2013–14, 2016–17, 2017–18, 2018–19, 2019–20, 2021–22
- DFB Pokal:
  - Winners (11): 2012–13, 2014–15, 2015–16, 2016–17, 2017–18, 2018–19, 2019–20, 2020–21, 2021–22, 2022–23, 2023–24 (Record)

=== Invitational ===
- Ladies First Cup:
  - Winners: 2013

=== Individual Club Awards ===
- IFFHS World's Best Woman Club:
  - Winners: 2013, 2014

== Record in UEFA competitions ==
=== UEFA Women's Champions League ===
All results (away, home and aggregate) list Wolfsburg's goal tally first.

Season	Round	Opponents	Away	Home	Aggregate
2012–13	Round of 32	(Poland) Unia Racibórz	5–1 ^{f}	6–1	11–2
2012–13	Round of 16	(Norway) Røa Oslo	1–1	4–1 ^{f}	5–2
2012–13	Quarter-final	(Russia) Rossiyanka Khimki	2–0	2–1 ^{f}	4–1
2012–13	Semi-final	(England) Arsenal	2–1 ^{f}	2–0	4–1
2012–13	Final	(France) Lyon	1–0 ( (England) London)		
2013–14	Round of 32	(Estonia) Pärnu	14–0 ^{f}	13–0	27–0
2013–14	Round of 16	(Sweden) Rosengård Malmö	2–1 ^{f}	3–1	5–2
2013–14	Quarter-final	(Spain) Barcelona	2–0	3–0 ^{f}	5–0
2013–14	Semi-final	(Germany) Turbine Potsdam	0–0	4–2 ^{f}	4–2
2013–14	Final	(Sweden) Tyresö	4–3 ( (Portugal) Lisbon)		
2014–15	Round of 32	(Norway) Stabæk Bærum	1–0 ^{f}	2–1	3–1
2014–15	Round of 16	(Austria) Neulengbach	4–0 ^{f}	7–0	11–0
2014–15	Quarter-final	(Sweden) Rosengård Malmö	3–3	1–1 ^{f}	4–4 (agr)
2014–15	Semi-final	(France) Paris Saint-Germain	2–1	0–2 ^{f}	2–3
2015–16	Round of 32	(Serbia) Spartak Subotica	0–0 ^{f}	4–0	4–0
2015–16	Round of 16	(England) Chelsea	2–1 ^{f}	2–0	4–1
2015–16	Quarter-final	(Italy) Brescia	3–0	3–0 ^{f}	6–0
2015–16	Semi-final	(Germany) Frankfurt	0–1	4–0 ^{f}	4–1
2015–16	Final	(France) Lyon	1–1 (a.e.t.) (3–4 p) ( (Italy) Reggio Emilia)		
2016–17	Round of 32	(England) Chelsea	3–0 ^{f}	1–1	4–1
2016–17	Round of 16	(Sweden) Eskilstuna United	5–1 ^{f}	3–0	8–1
2016–17	Quarter-final	(France) Lyon	1–0	0–2 ^{f}	1–2
2017–18	Round of 32	(Spain) Atlético Madrid	3–0 ^{f}	12–2	15–2
2017–18	Round of 16	(Italy) Fiorentina	4–0 ^{f}	3–3	7–3
2017–18	Quarter-final	(Czech Republic) Slavia Prague	1–1	5–0 ^{f}	6–1
2017–18	Semi-final	(England) Chelsea	3–1 ^{f}	2–0	5–1
2017–18	Final	(France) Lyon	1–4 (a.e.t.) ( (Ukraine) Kyiv)		
2018–19	Round of 32	(Iceland) Þór/KA Akureyri	1–0 ^{f}	2–0	3–0
2018–19	Round of 16	(Spain) Atlético Madrid	6–0	4–0 ^{f}	10–0
2018–19	Quarter-final	(France) Lyon	1–2 ^{f}	2–4	3–6
2019–20	Round of 32	(Kosovo) Mitrovica	10–0 ^{f}	5–0	15–0
2019–20	Round of 16	(Netherlands) Twente	1–0	6–0 ^{f}	7–0
2019–20	Quarter-final	(Scotland) Glasgow City	9–1 ( (Spain) San Sebastián)		
2019–20	Semi-final	(Spain) Barcelona	1–0 ( (Spain) San Sebastián)		
2019–20	Final	(France) Lyon	1–3 ( (Spain) San Sebastián)		
2020–21	Round of 32	(Serbia) Spartak Subotica	5–0 ^{f}	2–0	7–0
2020–21	Round of 16	(Norway) LSK Kvinner	2–0	2–0 ^{f}	4–0
2020–21	Quarter-final	(England) Chelsea	1–2 ^{f}	0–3	1–5
2021–22	Round 2	(France) Bordeaux	2–3 (a.e.t.)	3–2 ^{f}	5–5 (3–0 p)
2021–22	Group A	(Switzerland) Servette	3–0	5–0	1st
2021–22	Group A	(England) Chelsea	3–3	4–0	1st
2021–22	Group A	(Italy) Juventus	2–2	0–2	1st
2021–22	Quarter-final	(England) Arsenal	1–1 ^{f}	2–0	3–1
2021–22	Semi-final	(Spain) Barcelona	1–5 ^{f}	2–0	3–5
2022–23	Group B	(Czech Republic) Slavia Prague	2–0	0–0	1st
2022–23	Group B	(Austria) St. Pölten	8–2	4–0	1st
2022–23	Group B	(Italy) Roma	1–1	4–2	1st
2022–23	Quarter-final	(France) Paris Saint-Germain	1–0 ^{f}	1–1	2–1
2022–23	Semi-final	(England) Arsenal	3–2 (a.e.t.)	2–2	5–4
2022–23	Final	(Spain) Barcelona	2–3 ( (Netherlands) Eindhoven)		
2023–24	Qualifying round 2	(France) Paris FC	3–3 ^{f}	0–2	3–5
2024–25	Qualifying round 2	(Italy) Fiorentina	7–0 ^{f}	5–0	12–0
2024–25	Group A	(France) Lyon	0–1	0–2 ^{f}	2nd
2024–25	Group A	(Italy) Roma	0–1 ^{f}	6–1	2nd
2024–25	Group A	(Turkey) Galatasaray	5–0 ^{f}	5–0	2nd
2024–25	Quarter-final	(Spain) Barcelona	1–6	1–4 ^{f}	2–10
2025–26	League phase	(France) Paris Saint-Germain	—N/a	4–0	9th of 18
2025–26	League phase	(Norway) Vålerenga	2–1	—N/a	9th of 18
2025–26	League phase	(France) Lyon	1–3	—N/a	9th of 18
2025–26	League phase	(England) Manchester United	—N/a	5–2	9th of 18
2025–26	League phase	(Spain) Real Madrid	0–2	—N/a	9th of 18
2025–26	League phase	(England) Chelsea	—N/a	1–2	9th of 18
2025–26	Knockout phase play-offs	(Italy) Juventus	2–0	2–2^{f}	4–2
2025–26	Quarter-finals	(France) Lyon	0–4 (a.e.t.)	1–0^{f}	1–4
2026–27	Qualifying round 3	(Italy) Inter Milan	1–3 (a.e.t.)	2–0^{f}	3–3 (4–5 p)

^{f} First leg.

=== UEFA Women's Europa Cup ===
All results (away, home and aggregate) list the club's goal tally first.

Season	Round	Team	Away	Home	Aggregate
2026–27	Second qualifying round	(Austria) Sturm Graz	2–0	6–1^{f}	8–1
2026–27	Round of 16	(Netherlands) Feyenoord	3–0	7–0^{f}	10–0
2026–27	Quarter-finals	(Denmark) Brøndby	^{f}		

^{f} First leg.
