= Camilla Linberg =

Norwegian footballer (born 1999)

Personal information
- Date of birth: 19 February 1999 (age 27)
- Place of birth: Oslo, Norway
- Height: 1.70 m (5 ft 7 in)
- Position: Forward

Team information
- Current team: Hamburger SV
- Number: 7

Youth career
- Stabæk

Senior career*
Years	Team	Apps	(Gls)
2015–2016	Stabæk	1	(0)
2016–2020	Lyn	90	(22)
2021–2022	LSK Kvinner	15	(4)
2022–2023	Como	12	(4)
2023–2024	Rosenborg	26	(3)
2025	Kolbotn	19	(9)
2026–	Hamburger SV	22	(10)

International career
2015	Norway U16	11	(6)
2016	Norway U17	7	(1)
2017–2018	Norway U19	3	(2)
2019–2023	Norway U23	3	(2)
- * Club domestic league appearances and goals as of 21 November 2026

Camilla Linberg (born 19 February 1999) is a Norwegian footballer who plays as a forward for Frauen-Bundesliga club Hamburger SV.

She played youth football for Stabæk, but only got one league match before moving on to Lyn. Here she helped the club win promotion to Toppserien. In 2020 she was nominated for Breakthrough of the Year, as she among others contended for the title as the league's top goalscorer. Linberg joined a larger club, LSK Kvinner in 2021. She terminated her contract in 2022 and joined Serie A Femminile club Como, as did teammate Malin Brenn.

Following 4 goals in 12 games for Como, Linberg was wanted by Rosenborg where she signed a two-year contract in June 2023. In 2023 she won the 2023 Norwegian Women's Cup with Rosenborg, but in the cup final, she sustained an injury that would take ten weeks to heal. She left Rosenborg nine months ahead of time, in March 2025, to join Kolbotn who underwent a squad rebuild.

In January 2026, Linberg joined Frauen-Bundesliga club Hamburger SV.
