= Cora Zicai =

German footballer (born 2004)

Personal information
- Full name: Cora Nevena Zicai
- Date of birth: 29 November 2004 (age 21)
- Place of birth: Freiburg im Breisgau, Germany
- Height: 1.74 m (5 ft 9 in)
- Position: Forward

Team information
- Current team: VfL Wolfsburg
- Number: 28

Youth career
- –2017: Sportfreunde Eintracht Freiburg
- 2017–2021: SC Freiburg

Senior career*
Years	Team	Apps	(Gls)
2021	SC Freiburg II	1	(0)
2021–2025	SC Freiburg	79	(14)
2025–	VfL Wolfsburg	31	(8)

International career^{‡}
2017–2019	Germany U15	7	(1)
2019–2020	Germany U16	5	(2)
2021–2023	Germany U19	10	(5)
2021–2024	Germany U20	17	(5)
2024–	Germany	8	(2)
- * Club domestic league appearances and goals as of 20:37, 22 November 2026 (UTC) ‡ National team caps and goals as of 21:21, 13 October 2026 (UTC)

Cora Nevena Zicai (born 29 November 2004) is a German footballer who plays as a forward for Frauen-Bundesliga club VfL Wolfsburg and the Germany national team. She has previously played for SC Freiburg.

== Club career ==
=== SC Freiburg ===
Zicai began playing football at Sportfreunde Eintracht Freiburg before moving to SC Freiburg in 2017. Aged 16, she made her Bundesliga debut in March 2021, playing against Bayern Munich in a 1–5 loss. Zicai scored her maiden Bundesliga goal a week after, striking a precise finish from the edge of the box to extend Freiburg's lead in a 2–1 victory versus Duisburg. This made her Freiburg's youngest Bundesliga goalscorer. She continued progressing during the 2021–22 season, making her first league start against Hoffenheim and playing a total of 12 games. Zicai was also awarded the bronze edition of the Fritz Walter Medal in November 2022 to honour her 2021 performances.

Zicai had a productive first half of 2022–23, scoring in wins against SGS Essen and Turbine Potsdam, as well as notching up three assists. The second half of her season was affected by groin problems, though she managed to assist the winning goal in the DFB-Pokal semi-final versus RB Leipzig. Zicai then became a regular starter in 2023–24, took part in all 22 league matches, and scored thrice as Freiburg finished ninth.

She became Freiburg's most impactful offensive player in 2024–25, scoring eight goals and assisting four to help the team towards a fifth place finish. This included a strong start to her campaign, as Zicai scored off the bench in a 2–0 win over Köln, notched two goals against Potsdam (3–0), and helped Freiburg towards a 4–1 win against Leipzig with a goal and an assist. Additionally, Zicai initiated the first goal versus Bayern, before scoring the second one herself in a 2–2 draw. She then scored a long-range goal versus Bayern in the DFB-Pokal, a match Freiburg lost 1–2. In recognition of her performances, Zicai was named Freiburg's sportswoman of 2024. Zicai continued contributing in the season's second half. Among these contributions were two assists versus Jena, her 1–0 winner in Potsdam, and a spectacular long-distance strike against Frankfurt which Freiburg surprisingly beat 3–2.

=== VfL Wolfsburg ===
Ahead of the 2025–26 season, Zicai moved to VfL Wolfsburg on a free transfer, signing a contract until 2028.

== International career ==
=== Youth ===
Zicai represented Germany at the youth level at the 2022 and 2024 U-20 World Cups. The team exited in the group stage during the former, but reached the quarter finals in the latter, with Zicai contributing three goals and assists each. She scored five goals for the U-19 team, but missed out on the 2022 U-19 Euros and had to withdraw from the 2023 U-19 Euros on short notice.

=== Senior ===
Zicai was called up to the senior national team by national coach Christian Wück in November 2024. She scored her first international goal on her debut in the 6–0 friendly win against Switzerland on 29 November 2024, her 20th birthday. She then scored her next goal as a substitute in a 2025 Nations League win over Scotland. Subsequently, Zicai was included in the Germany squad for the 2025 Euros in Switzerland.

== Personal life ==
Zicai's mother comes from Bulgaria and previously participated in pentathlon competition, while her father is from Mozambique. During her successful 2024–25 season, Freiburg teammates Alina Axtmann and Tessa Blumenberg nicknamed Zicai "Tooora Zicai", in reference to the German word for goal, Tor.

== Career statistics ==
=== International ===
As of 13 October 2026

Appearances and goals by national team and year
National team	Year	Apps	Goals
Germany	2024	2	1
Germany	2025	4	1
Germany	2026	2	0
Total		8	2

Scores and results list Germany's goal tally first, score column indicates score after each Zicai goal.

List of international goals scored by Cora Zicai
No.	Date	Venue	Opponent	Score	Result	Competition
1	29 November 2024	Zurich, Switzerland	Switzerland	5–0	6–0	Friendly
2	4 April 2025	Dundee, Scotland	Scotland	3–0	4–0	2025 UEFA Women's Nations League

== Honours ==
Individual

- Fritz Walter Medal Bronze (Female U17): 2021
