= Bayer 04 Leverkusen (women) =

Women's football team of the German sports club

Bayer Leverkusen
- Full name: Bayer 04 Leverkusen Fußball GmbH
- Nickname: Werkself
- Founded: 1 July 2008; 18 years ago
- Ground: Ulrich-Haberland-Stadion
- Capacity: 3,200
- Sporting director: Achim Feifel
- Head coach: Roberto Pätzold
- League: Frauen-Bundesliga
- 2025–26: Bundesliga, 5th of 14
- Website: bayer04.de
Home colours	Away colours

Bayer 04 Leverkusen, also known as Bayer Leverkusen, Leverkusen, or simply known as Bayer, is a German women's football club based in Leverkusen, North Rhine-Westphalia. The club plays in the Frauen-Bundesliga, the top tier of German football.

== History ==
The origin of Bayer Leverkusen women's football section lies at the SSG 09 Bergisch Gladbach, which in the 1970s and 1980s was the dominating club in German women's football. In that period Bergisch Gladbach won the national women's football championship nine times which today is still the record. They also won the DFB-Pokal three times. After the inception of the Bundesliga in 1990 their performance declined through the 1990s, eventually leading to relegation.

In 1996 the women's team moved from SSG 09 Bergisch Gladbach to TuS Köln rrh. At Köln the team played mostly second-tier football with a few seasons in the third tier in between. Their greatest success was a semi-final appearance in the 2007–08 cup. However the team was not able to find sponsors, that would help to realize the team's ambitions of playing Bundesliga football again. Contemporaneously Bayer Leverkusen pronounced their interest to establish a women's football section of their own. On 25 June 2008 the women's football department of TuS Köln rrh. disbanded to join Bayer Leverkusen.

In their first season at Bayer Leverkusen the team finished 7th in the south group of the 2. Bundesliga. The following season Leverkusen became champions of the 2. Bundesliga and would thus play in the Bundesliga in the 2010–11 season. In its debut season the team finished 8th.

The following season the team finished 11th in the table, yet wasn't relegated as Hamburger SV announced its disestablishment of the women's section. Since the 2012–13 season, Leverkusen had been coached by Thomas Obliers, until his resignation in 2017. Leverkusen were relegated back to the 2. Bundesliga soon after.

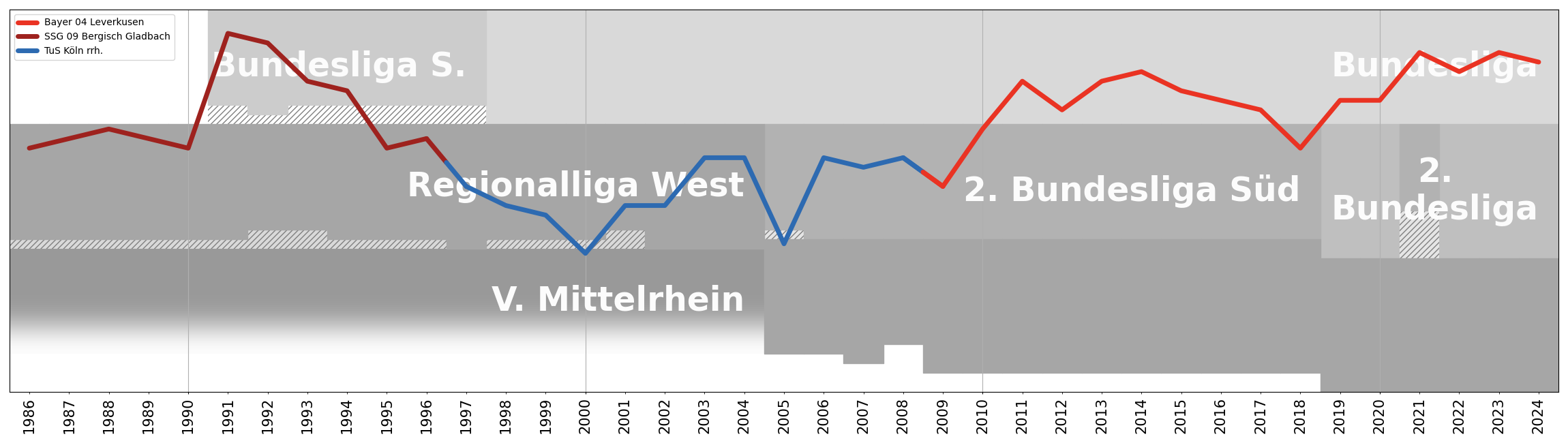
Chart of league positions at end of season

=== First-team squad ===
As of 31 August 2026

Note: Flags indicate national team as defined under FIFA eligibility rules; some limited exceptions apply. Players may hold more than one non-FIFA nationality.

No.	Pos.	Nation	Player
1	GK	GER	Charlotte Voll
2	DF	GER	Selina Ostermeier
3	DF	GER	Melissa Friedrich
5	DF	AUT	Claudia Wenger
6	MF	GER	Paulina Platner
7	FW	DEN	Cornelia Kramer
8	DF	NED	Justine Brandau
9	FW	CAN	Caroline Kehrer
10	FW	GER	Estrella Merino Gonzalez
11	MF	GER	Natasha Kowalski
12	GK	GER	Rafaela Borggräfe (on loan from Liverpool)
14	DF	GER	Emily Wallrabenstein
16	MF	GER	Sofie Zdebel
17	FW	AUT	Valentina Mädl

No.	Pos.	Nation	Player
18	FW	NED	Lobke Loonen
19	MF	GER	Loreen Bender
21	FW	GER	Vanessa Fudalla
23	FW	SLO	Maja Sternad
24	DF	HUN	Lilla Turányi
27	MF	GER	Marlene Müller
28	FW	POL	Paulina Tomasiak
30	DF	GER	Carolin Simon
34	MF	KOS	Lumbardha Misini
35	GK	GER	Louisa Remien
41	FW	GER	Amy Wrigge
42	DF	TUR	Sana Coşkun

=== Out on loan ===
Note: Flags indicate national team as defined under FIFA eligibility rules; some limited exceptions apply. Players may hold more than one non-FIFA nationality.

No.	Pos.	Nation	Player
8	MF	GER	Paulina Bartz (on loan at Hamburger SV until 30 June 2026)

== Seasons ==
Season	League	Place	W	D	L	GF	GA	Pts	DFB-Pokal
2008–09	2nd Bundesliga (south) (II)	7	6	7	9	47	40	25	2nd round
2009–10	2nd Bundesliga (south)	1	17	3	2	62	19	54	Round of 16
2010–11	Bundesliga (I)	8	6	3	13	32	67	21	2nd round
2011–12	Bundesliga (I)	11	4	3	15	22	55	15	2nd round
2012–13	Bundesliga (I)	8	6	8	8	31	40	26	2nd round
2013–14	Bundesliga (I)	7	7	5	10	44	38	26	3rd round
2014–15	Bundesliga (I)	9	5	5	12	23	42	20	Round of 16
2015–16	Bundesliga (I)	10	6	3	13	21	56	21	Round of 16
2016–17	Bundesliga (I)	11	2	3	17	16	53	9	Semi-finals
2017–18	2nd Bundesliga (south)	3	13	2	7	47	37	41	2nd round
2018–19	Bundesliga (I)	10	5	3	14	22	75	18	Quarter-finals
2019–20	Bundesliga (I)	10	5	2	15	22	51	17	Semi-finals
2020–21	Bundesliga (I)	5	10	3	9	32	39	33	2nd round
2021–22	Bundesliga (I)	7	6	4	12	31	50	22	Semi-finals
2022–23	Bundesliga (I)	5	9	3	10	31	28	30	Round of 16
2023–24	Bundesliga (I)	6	8	7	7	34	25	31	Quarterfinals
2024–25	Bundesliga (I)	4	13	4	5	38	21	43	Quarterfinals
2025–26	Bundesliga (I)	5	15	1	10	46	36	46	Round of 16
Green marks a season followed by promotion, red a season followed by relegation.

== Stadia ==
- Kurt-Rieß-Anlage (2008–2011)
- Ulrich-Haberland-Stadion (Amateurstadion) (2011–2016)
- Nachwuchsleistungszentrum Kurtekotten (2016–)
