= Ella Peddemors =

Dutch footballer (born 2002)

Personal information
- Full name: Ella Inez Peddemors
- Date of birth: 6 August 2002 (age 24)
- Place of birth: Enschede, Netherlands
- Height: 1.72 m (5 ft 8 in)
- Position: Midfielder

Team information
- Current team: VfL Wolfsburg
- Number: 5

Youth career
- Avanti-Wilskracht
- cvv Sparta Enschede
- Twente

Senior career*
Years	Team	Apps	(Gls)
2019–2024	Twente	59	(10)
2024–	VfL Wolfsburg	45	(15)
2024	→ Twente (loan)	9	(3)

International career^{‡}
2017	Netherlands U15	3	(1)
2018	Netherlands U16	7	(0)
2018–2019	Netherlands U17	18	(2)
2020	Netherlands U18	3	(3)
2019–2020	Netherlands U19	12	(4)
2022	Netherlands U20	5	(0)
2022–2025	Netherlands U23	13	(4)
2025–	Netherlands	8	(1)
Medal record
Women's football
Representing Netherlands
UEFA Women's Under-17 Championship
Runner-up	2019 Bulgaria
- * Club domestic league appearances and goals as of 22 November 2026 ‡ National team caps and goals as of 13 October 2026

Ella Inez Peddemors (born 6 August 2002) is a Dutch professional footballer who plays as a midfielder for Frauen-Bundesliga club VfL Wolfsburg and the Netherlands national team.

== Club career ==
Peddemors is a youth academy graduate of Twente. In June 2024, she joined VfL Wolfsburg on a three-year contract and was immediately loaned back to Twente for one more season.

== International career ==
Peddemors has represented the Netherlands at various youth levels. She was part of the Dutch squad that finished as runners-up at the 2019 UEFA Women's Under-17 Championship.

In November 2024, Peddermors received her first call-up to the Netherlands national team. She made her debut on 24 October 2025 in a goalless draw against Poland.

== Career statistics ==
=== International ===
As of match played 13 October 2026

Appearances and goals by national team and year
National team	Year	Apps	Goals
Netherlands	2025	3	1
Netherlands	2026	5	0
Total		8	1

Scores and results list Netherlands' goal tally first, score column indicates score after each Peddemors goal.

List of international goals scored by Ella Peddemors
No.	Date	Venue	Opponent	Score	Result	Competition
1	2 December 2025	Mandemakers Stadion, Waalwijk, Netherlands	South Korea	5–0	5–0	Friendly

== Honours ==
Twente

- Vrouwen Eredivisie: 2020–21, 2021–22, 2023–24, 2024–25
- KNVB Women's Cup: 2022–23
- Eredivisie Cup: 2021–22, 2022–23, 2023–24
- Dutch Women's Super Cup: 2024

Netherlands U17

- UEFA Women's Under-17 Championship runner-up: 2019
