= 2025–26 VfL Wolfsburg (women) season =

German women's football club season

VfL Wolfsburg Frauen
2025–26 season
- Sporting director: Ralf Kellermann
- Head coach: Stephan Lerch
- Stadium: AOK Stadion; Volkswagen Arena (Select home games)
- Bundesliga: 2nd
- DFB-Pokal: Runners-up
- DFB-Supercup: Runners-up
- UEFA Champions League: Quarter-finals
- Top goalscorer: League: Alexandra Popp (14); All: Alexandra Popp (16)
- Highest home attendance: 12,495 (vs Bayern Munich, Bundesliga, 11 October 2025) at Volkswagen Arena
Home colours	Away colours	Third colours

The 2025–26 VfL Wolfsburg Frauen season was the club's 22nd season since VfR Eintracht Wolfsburg joined VfL Wolfsburg as its women's section.

== Season events ==
On 30 April 2025, it was announced that Lerch had signed a two-year contract with the club, effective from 1 July 2025.

The club finished runners-up in the DFB-Supercup Frauen.

On 22 December 2025, it was announced that the team would be travelling to Malta to take part in a training camp and the VisitMalta Women Club Trophy.

The club finished 2nd in the Frauen-Bundesliga, and also finished as runners-up in the DFB-Pokal Frauen. In the Champions League, the club progressed through the league phase and through the play-offs, before being knocked out in the quarter-finals against OL Lyonnes.

On 20 May 2026, VfL Wolfsburg took part in a friendly match against HSV Hankensbüttel for the club's 125th anniversary.

== Players ==
No.	Nat	Name	Date of birth (age)	Signed from	Since
Goalkeepers
1	(Germany)	Stina Johannes	23 January 2000 (age 26)	(Germany) Eintracht Frankfurt	2025
12	(Germany)	Nelly Smolarczyk			
21	(Germany)	Martina Tufekovic	16 July 1994 (age 32)	(Germany) TSG 1899 Hoffenheim	2025
22	(Austria)	Christina Schönwetter			
Defenders
2	(Norway)	Thea Bjelde	5 June 2000 (age 26)	(Norway) Vålerenga	2025
3	(Netherlands)	Caitlin Dijkstra	30 January 1999 (age 27)	(Netherlands) Twente	2023
4	(Germany)	Sophia Kleinherne	12 April 2000 (age 26)	(Germany) Eintracht Frankfurt	2025
15	(Netherlands)	Janou Levels	30 October 2000 (age 25)	(Germany) Bayer Leverkusen	2025
16	(Germany)	Camilla Küver	10 June 2003 (age 23)	(Germany) Eintracht Frankfurt	2023
20	(Norway)	Guro Bergsvand	3 March 1994 (age 32)	(England) Brighton & Hove Albion	2025
24	(Germany)	Joelle Wedemeyer	12 August 1996 (age 29)	Academy	2013
33	(Spain)	Judit Pujols	25 February 2005 (age 21)	(Spain) Barcelona	2025
35	(Germany)	Karla Brinkmann			
39	(Germany)	Sarai Linder	26 October 1999 (age 26)	(Germany) TSG Hoffenheim	2024
Midfielders
5	(Netherlands)	Ella Peddemors	6 August 2002 (age 23)	(Netherlands) Twente	2024
6	(Germany)	Janina Minge	11 June 1999 (age 27)	(Germany) SC Freiburg	2024
8	(Germany)	Lena Lattwein	2 May 2000 (age 26)	(Germany) TSG Hoffenheim	2021
10	(Germany)	Svenja Huth	25 January 1991 (age 35)	(Germany) Turbine Potsdam	2019
13	(Hungary)	Luca Papp	24 April 2002 (age 24)	(Hungary) Ferencvárosi TC	2024
14	(Switzerland)	Smilla Vallotto	23 March 2004 (age 22)	(Sweden) Hammarby	2023
18	(Norway)	Justine Kielland	22 November 2002 (age 23)	(Norway) SK Brann	2024
Forwards
9	(Netherlands)	Lineth Beerensteyn	11 October 1996 (age 29)	(Italy) Juventus	2024
11	(Germany)	Alexandra Popp	6 April 1991 (age 35)	(Germany) FCR 2001 Duisburg	2012
19	(France)	Kessya Bussy	19 June 2001 (age 25)	(France) Paris FC	2025
25	(Germany)	Vivien Endemann	7 August 2001 (age 24)	(Germany) SGS Essen	2023
28	(Germany)	Cora Zicai	29 November 2004 (age 21)	(Germany) SC Freiburg	2025

== Transfers ==
=== In ===
No.	Pos.	Nat.	Player	Moving from	Type	Fee	Source
Summer
1	GK	(Germany)	Stina Johannes	(Germany) Eintracht Frankfurt	Transfer	Free	
22	GK	(Austria)	Christina Schönwetter	(Austria) First Vienna FC	Transfer	Free	
	FW	(Norway)	Anny Kerim-Lindland	(Germany) 1. FC Nürnberg	Transfer	Free	
20	DF	(Norway)	Guro Bergsvand	(England) Brighton & Hove Albion	Transfer	Free	
4	DF	(Germany)	Sophia Kleinherne	(Germany) Eintracht Frankfurt	Transfer	Free	
14	MF	(Switzerland)	Smilla Vallotto	(Sweden) Hammarby Fotboll	Transfer	Free	
2	DF	(Norway)	Thea Bjelde	(Norway) Vålerenga	Transfer	Free	
33	DF	(Spain)	Judit Pujols	(Spain) FC Barcelona	Transfer	Free	
	MF	(Poland)	Weronika Araśniewicz	(Spain) FC Barcelona	Transfer	Free	
19	FW	(France)	Kessya Bussy	(France) Paris FC	Transfer	Free	
	FW	(Norway)	Linnea Sælen	(Norway) Arna-Bjørnar	Transfer	Free	

=== Out ===
No.	Pos.	Nat.	Player	Moving to	Type	Fee	Source
Summer
30	GK	(Germany)	Anneke Borbe	(England) Arsenal	Contract expiring		
23	MF	(Iceland)	Sveindís Jane Jónsdóttir	(United States) Angel City FC	Contract expiring		
2	DF	(Netherlands)	Lynn Wilms	(England) Aston Villa	Contract expiring		
29	MF	(Germany)	Jule Brand	(France) OL Lyonnes	Contract expiring		
17	DF	(Germany)	Kristin Demann		Retired		
1	GK	(Germany)	Merle Frohms	(Spain) Real Madrid	Contract expiring		
31	DF	(Germany)	Marina Hegering	(Germany) 1. FC Köln	Contract expiring		
4	DF	(Germany)	Kathrin Hendrich	(United States) Chicago Stars FC	Contract expiring		
22	GK	(Germany)	Lisa Schmitz	(Germany) 1. FC Köln	Contract expiring		
28	FW	(Germany)	Tabea Sellner		Retired		
15	DF	(Hungary)	Diána Németh	(Germany) RB Leipzig	Contract termination		
27	MF	(Switzerland)	Riola Xhemaili	(Netherlands) PSV	Transfer	Undisclosed	
20	FW	(Spain)	Ariana Arias	(Spain) CD Tenerife	Contract expiring		
7	MF	(Germany)	Chantal Hagel	(Spain) Sevilla	Transfer	Undisclosed	
7	FW	(Australia)	Sharn Freier	(Australia) Brisbane Roar	Loan	Undisclosed	

== Pre-season and friendlies ==
17 July 2025	RB Leipzig	3–2	VfL Wolfsburg	Markranstädt
14:00 CEST	Schasching 30+1'; Kadowaki 32'; Schimmer 89'	Report	Endemann 12', 39'	Stadium: Stadion am Bad; Referee: Christine Weigelt

26 July 2025	VfL Wolfsburg	6–0	Sparta Prague	Calberlah
15:00 CEST	Lattwein 11', 21'; Peddemors 14'; Huth 50', 76'; Yamaue 87'	Report		Stadium: Relog-Sportpark; Attendance: 1,300; Referee: Rene Rose

10 August 2025	VfL Wolfsburg	0–2	Union Berlin	Wolfsburg
16:00 CEST		Report	Weidauer 20'; Bauereisen 88'	Stadium: AOK Stadion; Attendance: 2,728; Referee: Anna-Lena Heidenreich

22 August 2025	Bayer Leverkusen	2–3	VfL Wolfsburg	Hof
14:00 CEST	Kögel 49'; Kramer 51'	Report	Popp 2'; Huth 69'; Freier 80'	Stadium: Stadion Grüne Au; Attendance: 1,225; Referee: Angelika Söder

=== January ===
11 January 2026 VisitMalta Women Club Trophy	VfL Wolfsburg	2–0	PSV	Malta
	Peddemors 45+1'; Bussy 58'	Report		Referee: Jo-Anna Vassallo

14 January 2026 VisitMalta Women Club Trophy	VfL Wolfsburg	5–0	FC Basel	Malta
	Popp 40', 45+2', 53'; Endemann 45'; Beerensteyn 51'	Report		Referee: Reuben Spiteri Delicata

== Competitions ==
=== Overview ===
Competition	First match	Last match	Starting round	Final position	Record							
Competition	First match	Last match	Starting round	Final position	Pld	W	D	L	GF	GA	GD	Win %
Bundesliga	6 September 2025	17 May 2026	Matchday 1	Runners-up	26	18	4	4	72	38	+34	69.23
DFB-Pokal	29 September 2025	14 May 2026	First round	Runners-up	5	3	1	1	15	5	+10	60.00
DFB-Supercup	30 August 2025		Final	Runners-up	1	0	0	1	2	4	−2	0.00
UEFA Champions League	8 October 2025	2 April 2026	League phase	Quarter-finals	10	5	1	4	18	16	+2	50.00
Total					42	26	6	10	107	63	+44	61.90

Source: Competitions

=== DFB-Supercup ===
30 August 2025 Final	Bayern Munich	4–2	VfL Wolfsburg	Wildparkstadion, Karlsruhe
14:00 CEST (UTC+2)	Eriksson 18'; Damnjanović 25'; Schüller 72'; Stanway 78' (pen.)	Report	Endemann 57'; Minge 88' (pen.)	Attendance: 16,933; Referee: Riem Hussein

=== Bundesliga ===
==== Standings ====
Pos	Team	Pld	W	D	L	GF	GA	GD	Pts	Qualification or relegation
1	Bayern Munich (C)	26	24	2	0	90	9	+81	74	Qualification for Champions League league phase
2	VfL Wolfsburg	26	18	4	4	72	38	+34	58	Qualification for Champions League third qualifying round
3	Eintracht Frankfurt	26	16	3	7	65	43	+22	51	Qualification for Champions League second qualifying round
4	TSG Hoffenheim	26	14	4	8	48	30	+18	46	
5	Bayer Leverkusen	26	15	1	10	46	36	+10	46	

Source: DFB
Rules for classification: 1) Points; 2) Goal difference; 3) Goals scored; 4) Head-to-head results; 5) Head-to-head away goals scored; 6) Away goals scored; 7) Play-off.
(C) Champions

==== Results ====
7 September 2025 1	Hamburger SV	3–3	VfL Wolfsburg	Hamburg
	Sieger (yellow card) 28'; Hillebrand 31'; Brunnthaler 81'; Stoldt 90+7'	Report	Beerensteyn 26'; Minge 29' (pen.); Popp 52' (yellow card) 90+8'; Dijkstra (yellow card) 62'; Zicai (yellow card) 83'	Stadium: Volksparkstadion; Attendance: 11,934; Referee: Angelika Soder

14 September 2025 2	VfL Wolfsburg	3–1	Carl Zeiss Jena	Wolfsburg
	Minge 42'; Wedemeyer (yellow card) 65'; Huth (yellow card) 77'; Zicai 82'; Beerensteyn 87'	Report	Schmid (yellow card) 34'; Jaron 56' (yellow card) 78'	Stadium: AOK Stadion; Attendance: 3,420; Referee: Nadine Westerhoff

21 September 2025 3	1. FC Köln	1–2	VfL Wolfsburg	Cologne
	Achcińska (yellow card) 16'; Imping 38'; Matysik (yellow card) 69'; Agrež (yellow card) 80'	Report	Wedemeyer (yellow card) 8'; Popp (yellow card) 26'; Beerensteyn 45'; Levels (yellow card) 74'; Bussy (yellow card) 90+4'; Küver 90+7'	Stadium: Franz-Kemer-Stadium; Attendance: 2,240; Referee: Naemi Breier

24 September 2025 4	VfL Wolfsburg	4–2	Werder Bremen	Wolfsburg
	Peddemors 30'; Levels 52'; Bussy (yellow card) 66'; Huth 84'; Popp 89'	Report	Mühlhaus 81' (pen.); Pápai 90+4'	Stadium: AOK Stadion; Attendance: 2,715; Referee: Anna-Lena Heidenreich

4 October 2010 5	SGS Essen	0–8	VfL Wolfsburg	Essen
	Kowalski (yellow card) 50'	Report	Peddemors 4'; Bussy 13', 53'; Minge 50'; Endemann 72', 73'; Beerensteyn 78' (pen.); Zicai 86'	Stadium: Stadion an der Hafenstraße; Attendance: 2,023; Referee: Franziska Wildfeuer

11 October 2025 6	VfL Wolfsburg	1–3	Bayern Munich	Wolfsburg
	Minge 48'; Wedemeyer (red card)	Report	Bühl 27'; Tanikawa 57'; Eriksson (yellow card) 79'; Şehitler 90+5'	Stadium: Volkswagen Arena; Attendance: 12,495; Referee: Fabienne Michel

19 October 2025 7	Bayer Leverkusen	1–5	VfL Wolfsburg	Leverkusen
	Voll (red card) 1'; Wenger 46'; Turányi (red card) 51'	Report	Popp 23', 43'; Beerensteyn 48'; Wenger 72' (o.g.); Bergsvand 88'	Stadium: Ulrich-Haberland-Stadion; Attendance: 1,381; Referee: Davina Lutz

1 November 2025 8	VfL Wolfsburg	2–1	TSG Hoffenheim	Wolfsburg
	Beerensteyn 72'; Vallotto 90+1'	Report	Janssens 38'; Ampoorter 81'; Kaut (yellow card) 90' (red card) 90'	Stadium: AOK Stadion; Attendance: 2,953; Referee: Miriam Schwermer

4 November 2025 9	Union Berlin	1–4	Vfl Wolfsburg	Berlin
	Halverkamps 22'	Report	Joelle Wedemeyer (yellow card) 1'; Lattwein 57'; Popp 71'; Vallotto 80'; Peddemors 90+1'	Stadium: Stadion An der Alten Försterei; Attendance: 7,254; Referee: Anna-Lena Heidenreich

8 November 2025 10	VfL Wolfsburg	2–3	Eintracht Frankfurt	Wolfsburg
	Bussy 8'; Peddemors (yellow card) 45+3'; Lattwein (yellow card) 64'; Popp 89'	Report	Anyomi 26'; Freigang 29'; Lührßen (red card) 38'; Senß (yellow card) 44'; Altenburg (yellow card) 75'; Blomqvist 85'	Stadium: Volkswagen Arena; Attendance: 4,345; Referee: Riem Hussein

23 November 2025 11	RB Leipzig	1–3	VfL Wolfsburg	Leipzig
	Dudek (yellow card) 20'; Krug (yellow card) 24'; Boboy 42'	Report	Zicai 14'; Bussy 27'; Dijkstra (yellow card) 64'; Krug 84' (o.g.)	Stadium: RB-Trainingszentrum Cottaweg; Attendance: 1,184; Referee: Selina Menzel

5 December 2025 12	VfL Wolfsburg	3–1	SC Freiburg	Wolfsburg
	Lattwein (yellow card) 13'; Popp 51', 88' (yellow card) 78'; Dijkstra 68'	Report	Egli 12'; Stegemann (yellow card) 53'	Stadium: AOK Stadion; Attendance: 2,495; Referee: Naemi Breier

13 December 2025 13	1. FC Nürnberg	1–6	VfL Wolfsburg	Nuremberg
	Senelius (yellow card) 19'; Miller (yellow card) 45'; Fördős (yellow card) 49'; Mai 64'	Report	Popp 26'; Endemann 45+4'; Lattwein 58'; Kielland 61', 69'; Kessya Bussy 84'; Kleinherne (yellow card) 90+3'	Stadium: Max-Morlock-Stadion; Attendance: 1,101; Referee: Annika Kost

21 December 2025 14	VfL Wolfsburg	3–1	Hamburger SV	Wolfsburg
18:30 CET (UTC+1)	Lattwein (yellow card) 62'; Popp 69', 80'; Bussy 90+3'	Report	Machtens (yellow card) 11'; Stoldt 51'; Schulz (yellow card) 65'	Stadium: AOK Stadion; Referee: Anna-Lena Heidenreich

2 February 2026 16	VfL Wolfsburg	2–1	1. FC Köln	Wolfsburg
18:00 CET (UTC+1)	Beerensteyn 4', 68'; Kleinherne (yellow card) 87'	Report	Linder 23' (o.g.); Wiankowska (yellow card) 87'	Stadium: AOK Stadion; Attendance: 2,343; Referee: Nadine Westerhoff

15 February 2026 18	VfL Wolfsburg	1–1	SGS Essen	Wolfsburg
14:00 CET (UTC+1)	Bussy 4'	Report	Touon 48'; Flach (yellow card) 54'	Stadium: AOK Stadion; Attendance: 2,526; Referee: Miriam Schwermer

22 February 2026 19	Bayern Munich	4–1	VfL Wolfsburg	Munich
16:20 CET (UTC+1)	Stanway (yellow card) 17' (goal) 70'; Damnjanović 54', 56'; Bühl 80'; Dunst (yellow card) 88'	Report	Bussy 16' (yellow card) 40'; Küver (yellow card) 25'; Endemann (yellow card) 32'; Zicai (yellow card) 78'	Stadium: FC Bayern Campus; Attendance: 2,500; Referee: Riem Hussein

15 March 2026 20	Vfl Wolfsburg	2–1	Bayer Leverkusen	Wolfsburg
18:30 CET (UTC+1)	Levels 5'; Popp 77' (yellow card) 85'; Zicai (yellow card) 90+2'	Report	Bender (yellow card) 59'; Fudalla 90+3'	Stadium: AOK Stadion; Attendance: 2,425; Referee: Annika Kost

18 March 2026 15	Carl Zeiss Jena	0–2	VfL Wolfsburg	Jena
18:00 CET (UTC+1)		Report	Pujols (yellow card) 8'; Popp 23'; Zicai 36'; Dijkstra (yellow card) 86'	Stadium: Ernst-Abbe-Sportfeld; Attendance: 1,099; Referee: Angelika Söder
Note: The match, which was originally scheduled for 24 January, was postponed due to weather conditions.

21 March 2026 21	TSG Hoffenheim	0–1	VfL Wolfsburg	Sinsheim
14:00 CET (UTC+1)	Ampoorter (yellow card) 28'; Doorn (yellow card) 46'	Report	Beerensteyn 69'	Stadium: Dietmar-Hopp-Stadion; Attendance: 1,220; Referee: Naemi Breier

29 March 2026 22	VfL Wolfsburg	3–3	Union Berlin	Wolfsburg
16:00 CEST (UTC+2)	Levels (yellow card) 33'; Minge 45+1'; Küver 84'; Johannes (red card) 87'; Pujols 90+5'	Report	Steuerwald (yellow card) 19'; Eurlings 43', (yellow card) 90+8'; Küver 62' (o.g.); Pawollek (yellow card) 67'; Hipp 78'; Bauereisen (yellow card) 90+3'	Stadium: AOK Stadion; Attendance: 3,517; Referee: Anna-Lena Heidenreich

22 April 2026 17	Werder Bremen	0–0	VfL Wolfsburg	Bremen
18:00 CEST (UTC+2)	Gutmann (red card) 86'; Mühlhaus (yellow card) 86'; EL Sherif (yellow card) 86'	Report	Pujols (yellow card) 55'; Levels (red card) 89'; Minge (yellow card) 89'	Stadium: Weserstadion Platz 11; Attendance: 2,279; Referee: Fabienne Michel
Note: The match, which was originally scheduled for 7 February, was postponed due to weather conditions.

26 April 2026 23	Eintracht Frankfurt	3–1	VfL Wolfsburg	Frankfurt am Main
14:00 CEST (UTC+2)	Anyomi 27'; Memeti 44'; Riesen 46'; Lührßen (yellow card) 61'	Report	Kleinherne (yellow card) 78'; Minge 84' (pen.); Linder (yellow card) 87'	Stadium: Stadion am Brentanobad; Attendance: 4,722; Referee: Miriam Schwermer

2 May 2026 24	VfL Wolfsburg	3–2	RB Leipzig	Wolfsburg
15:00 CEST (UTC+2)	Minge 59'; Lattwein 66', 84'	Report	Chmielinski 9', 90+1'	Stadium: AOK Stadion; Attendance: 3,037; Referee: Angelika Soder

9 May 2026 25	SC Freiburg	2–4	VfL Wolfsburg	Freiburg
14:00 CEST (UTC+2)	Vobian 5'; Bienz 63'	Report	Küver 33'; Lattwein 45+4'; Linder 61'; Peddemors 76'; Zicai (yellow card) 81'; Kleinherne (yellow card) 83'	Stadium: Dreisamstadion; Attendance: 5,770; Referee: Sina Diekmann

17 May 2026 26	VfL Wolfsburg	3–1	1. FC Nürnberg	Wolfsburg
14:00 CEST (UTC+2)	Popp 13', 40'; Endemann (yellow card) 55'; Levels 78'	Report	Lein (yellow card) 39'; Romero 76'	Stadium: AOK Stadion; Attendance: 7,268; Referee: Lara Wolf

=== DFB-Pokal ===
27 September 2025 First round	ATS Buntentor	0–11	VfL Wolfsburg	Bremen
13:00 CEST (UTC+2)		Report	Endemann 7' (pen.), 48'; Küver 17'; Bergsvand 40'; Bussy 44', 68'; Huth 58'; Kielland 66'; Vallotto 69'; Saelen 75'; Zicai 80'	Stadium: SPA Stadtwerder; Attendance: 1,496; Referee: Lara Wolf

15 November 2025 Round of 16	VfL Wolfsburg	3–1	SC Freiburg	Wolfsburg
16:30 CET (UTC+1)	Beerensteyn 23'; Szenk 49' (o.g.); Zicai 64'	Report	Nachtigall 86'	Stadium: AOK Stadion; Attendance: 1,745; Referee: Franziska Wildfeuer

11 March 2026 Quarter-finals	VfL Wolfsburg	1–0	Eintracht Frankfurt	Wolfsburg
18:30 CET (UTC+1)	Minge (yellow card) 28'; Huth 35'	Report	Reuteler (yellow card) 24'	Stadium: AOK Stadion; Attendance: 2,183; Referee: Franziska Wildfeuer

5 April 2026 Semi-finals	Carl Zeiss Jena	0–0 (a.e.t.) (4–5 p)	VfL Wolfsburg	Jena
16:15 CEST (UTC+2)		Report		Stadium: Ernst-Abbe-Sportfeld; Attendance: 2,114; Referee: Angelika Söder
	Penalties
	Bonsu (penalty scored); Ihlenburg (penalty scored); Reuter (penalty scored); Mühlemann (penalty scored); Sträßer (penalty missed); Gaißer (penalty missed)		(penalty scored) Minge; (penalty missed) Beerensteyn; (penalty scored) Peddemors; (penalty scored) Linder; (penalty scored) Huth; (penalty scored) Vallotto

14 May 2026 Final	VfL Wolfsburg	0–4	Bayern Munich	Cologne
16:00 CEST (UTC+2)		Report	Stanway 45+2' (pen.); Harder 59'; Kett (yellow card) 68'; Tanikawa 77'; Caruso 84'	Stadium: RheinEnergieStadion; Attendance: 46,064; Referee: Franziska Wildfeuer

=== UEFA Women's Champions League ===
==== League phase ====
===== League phase table =====
Pos	Team	Pld	W	D	L	GF	GA	GD	Pts	Qualification
7	(Royal Spanish Football Federation) Real Madrid	6	3	2	1	13	7	+6	11	Advance to the knockout phase play-offs (seeded)
8	(Italian Football Federation) Juventus	6	3	1	2	13	8	+5	10	Advance to the knockout phase play-offs (seeded)
9	(German Football Association) VfL Wolfsburg	6	3	0	3	13	10	+3	9	Advance to the knockout phase play-offs (unseeded)
10	(French Football Federation) Paris FC	6	2	2	2	6	9	−3	8	Advance to the knockout phase play-offs (unseeded)
11	(Royal Spanish Football Federation) Atlético Madrid	6	2	1	3	13	9	+4	7	Advance to the knockout phase play-offs (unseeded)

Source: UEFA
Rules for classification: League phase tiebreakers

===== Matches =====
8 October 2025 1	VfL Wolfsburg (Germany)	4–0	(France) Paris Saint-Germain	Wolfsburg, Germany
21:00 CEST (UTC+2)	Groenen 7' (o.g.); Peddemors 42'; Popp 90'; Minge 90+5' (pen.)	Report		Stadium: AOK Stadion; Attendance: 1,734; Referee: Désirée Grundbacher (Switzerland)

15 October 2025 2	Vålerenga (Norway)	1–2	(Germany) VfL Wolfsburg	Oslo, Norway
18:45 CEST (UTC+2)	Hørte 60'	Report	Beerensteyn 57'; Minge 90+8' (pen.)	Stadium: Intility Arena; Attendance: 3,592; Referee: Marta Huerta de Aza (Spain)

11 November 2025 3	Lyon (France)	3–1	(Germany) VfL Wolfsburg	Décines-Charpieu, France
21:00 CET (UTC+1)	Hegerberg 25', 30'; Renard 72' (pen.)	Report	Beerensteyn 80'	Stadium: Parc Olympique Lyonnais; Attendance: 4,009; Referee: Eleni Antoniou (Greece)

19 November 2025 4	VfL Wolfsburg (Germany)	5–2	(England) Manchester United	Wolfsburg, Germany
18:45 CET (UTC+1)	Peddemors 17', 37'; Beerensteyn 45', 65'; Endemann 90+6'	Report	Rolfö 14'; Malard 45+2'	Stadium: Volkswagen Arena; Attendance: 3,817; Referee: Miriama Bočková (Slovakia)

9 December 2025 5	Real Madrid (Spain)	2–0	(Germany) VfL Wolfsburg	Madrid, Spain
21:00 CET (UTC+1)	Méndez 19'; Caicedo 67'	Report		Stadium: Alfredo Di Stéfano; Attendance: 1,171; Referee: Kirsty Dowle (England)

17 December 2025 6	VfL Wolfsburg (Germany)	1–2	(England) Chelsea	Wolfsburg, Germany
21:00 CET (UTC+1)	Popp 16'	Report	Bronze 45'; Kerr 64'	Stadium: AOK Stadion; Attendance: 2,627; Referee: Silvia Gasperotti (Italy)

==== Knockout phase ====
===== Play-offs =====
12 February 2026 1st leg	VfL Wolfsburg (Germany)	2–2	(Italy) Juventus	Wolfsburg, Germany
18:45 CET (UTC+1)	Minge 82' (pen.); Linder 90+5'	Report	Capeta 6'; Vangsgaard 61'	Stadium: Volkswagen Arena; Attendance: 2,452; Referee: Alina Peşu (Romania)

19 February 2026 2nd leg	Juventus (Italy)	0–2 (2–4 agg.)	(Germany) VfL Wolfsburg	Turin, Italy
18:45 CET (UTC+1)		Report	Endemann 18'; Zicai 90+6'	Stadium: Juventus Stadium; Attendance: 4,973; Referee: Frida Klarlund (Denmark)

===== Quarter-finals =====
24 March 2026 1st leg	VfL Wolfsburg (Germany)	1–0	(France) Lyon	Wolfsburg, Germany
18:45 CET (UTC+1)	Beerensteyn 14'; Johannes (yellow card) 89'; Küver (yellow card) 90'	Report	Egurrola (yellow card) 67'	Stadium: Volkswagen Arena; Attendance: 5,089; Referee: Emanuela Rusta (Albania)

2 April 2026 2nd leg	Lyon (France)	4–0 (a.e.t.) (4–1 agg.)	(Germany) VfL Wolfsburg	Parc Olympique Lyonnais, Décines-Charpieu
21:00 CEST (UTC+2)	Yohannes 16' (yellow card) 60'; Brand (yellow card) 61'; Dumornay 102'; Egurrola 105+2'; Chawinga 119'	Report		Attendance: 14,083; Referee: Marta Huerta de Aza (Spain)

== Statistics ==
Starting appearances are listed first, followed by substitute appearances after the + symbol where applicable.

As of match played 17 May 2026

No.	Pos.	Nat.	Player	Bundesliga		DFB-Pokal		DFB-Supercup		Champions League		Total	
No.	Pos.	Nat.	Player	Apps	Goals	Apps	Goals	Apps	Goals	Apps	Goals	Apps	Goals
1	GK	(Germany)	Stina Johannes	22	0	0	0	0	0	0	0	0	0
2	DF	(Norway)	Thea Bjelde	7+9	0	0	0	0	0	0	0	0	0
3	DF	(Netherlands)	Caitlin Dijkstra	15+2	1	0	0	0	0	0	0	0	0
4	DF	(Germany)	Sophia Kleinherne	5+1	0	0	0	0	0	0	0	0	0
5	MF	(Netherlands)	Ella Peddemors	18+6	4	0	0	0	0	0	0	0	0
6	MF	(Germany)	Janina Minge	21+4	7	0	0	0	0	0	0	0	0
7	FW	(Australia)	Sharn Freier	0	0	0	0	0	0	0	0	0	0
8	MF	(Germany)	Lena Lattwein	8+4	5	0	0	0	0	0	0	0	0
9	FW	(Netherlands)	Lineth Beerensteyn	14+7	9	0	0	0	0	0	0	0	0
10	MF	(Germany)	Svenja Huth	23+1	2	0	0	0	0	0	0	0	0
11	FW	(Germany)	Alexandra Popp	17+2	14	0	0	0	0	0	0	0	0
12	GK	(Germany)	Nelly Smolarczyk	1+1	0	0	0	0	0	0	0	0	0
13	MF	(Hungary)	Luca Papp	0	0	0	0	0	0	0	0	0	0
14	MF	(Switzerland)	Smilla Vallotto	4+9	2	0	0	0	0	0	0	0	0
15	DF	(Netherlands)	Janou Levels	17+4	3	0	0	0	0	0	0	0	0
16	DF	(Germany)	Camilla Küver	15+3	3	0	0	0	0	0	0	0	0
18	MF	(Norway)	Justine Kielland	18+5	3	0	0	0	0	0	0	0	0
19	FW	(France)	Kessya Bussy	8+10	8	0	0	0	0	0	0	0	0
20	DF	(Norway)	Guro Bergsvand	10+6	1	0	0	0	0	0	0	0	0
21	DF	(Germany)	Martina Tufekovic	3	0	0	0	0	0	0	0	0	0
22	GK	(Austria)	Christina Schönwetter	0	0	0	0	0	0	0	0	0	0
24	DF	(Germany)	Joelle Wedemeyer	16+4	0	0	0	0	0	0	0	0	0
25	FW	(Germany)	Vivien Endemann	10+9	3	0	0	0	0	0	0	0	0
28	FW	(Germany)	Cora Zicai	13+7	4	0	0	0	0	0	0	0	0
33	DF	(Spain)	Judit Pujols	7+12	1	0	0	0	0	0	0	0	0
35	DF	(Germany)	Karla Brinkmann	0	0	0	0	0	0	0	0	0	0
39	DF	(Germany)	Sarai Linder	13+6	1	0	0	0	0	0	0	0	0
