= 2024–25 VfL Wolfsburg (women) season =

VfL Wolfsburg Frauen
2024–25 season
- Sporting director: Ralf Kellermann
- Head coach: Tommy Stroot
- Stadium: AOK Stadion; Volkswagen Arena (Select home games)
- Bundesliga: 2nd
- DFB-Pokal: Quarter-finals
- DFB-Supercup: Runners-up
- UEFA Champions League: Quarter-finals
- Top goalscorer: League: Lineth Beerensteyn (16); All: Lineth Beerensteyn (19)
- Highest home attendance: 17,152 (vs Bayern Munich, 12 October 2024) at Volkswagen Arena
Home colours	Away colours	Third colours

The 2024–25 VfL Wolfsburg Frauen season was the club's 21st season since VfR Eintracht Wolfsburg joined VfL Wolfsburg as its women's section.

As the 2023–24 champions of the DFB-Pokal, VfL Wolfsburg participated in the DFB-Supercup which restarted with the 2024–25 season. The 25 August 2024 derby against Bayern Munich was the first bout of the season for VfL Wolfsburg.

== Season events ==
On 3 June 2024, VfL Wolfsburg announced the signing of Janina Minge from SC Freiburg on a contract until 30 June 2027. It was also announced that Caitlin Dijkstra returns from her loan to FC Twente to join the VfL Wolfburg squad.

On 11 June 2024, VfL Wolfsburg announced the signing of Sarai Linder from Bundesliga rivals TSG Hoffenheim on a contract until 30 June 2027.

On 13 June 2024, VfL Wolfsburg announced the signing of Luca Papp from Ferencváros on a contract until 30 June 2027.

On 17 June 2024, VfL Wolfsburg announced the signing of Lineth Beerensteyn from Juventus on a contract until 30 June 2026.

On 28 June 2024, VfL Wolfsburg announced the signing of Ella Peddemors from FC Twente on a contract until 30 June 2027. Peddemors will spend one more season at FC Twente on a loan before joining the VfL Wolfsburg squad in the 2025–26 season.

On 30 June 2024, VfL Wolfsburg announced the signing of Ariana Arias from FC Barcelona B team on a contract until 30 June 2027.

On 1 July 2024, VfL Wolfsburg announced the signing of Justine Kielland from SK Brann on a contract until 30 June 2027.

On 8 August 2024, VfL Wolfsburg announced that Riola Xhemaili prolonged her contract by one year, to 30 June 2027. It was also announced that Xhemaili will be joining the Dutch Eredivisie team PSV Eindhoven on loan for the 2024–25 season.

== Players ==
No.	Pos.	Nat.	Name	Age	EU	Since	App.	Goals	Ends	Notes
Goalkeepers
1	GK	(Germany)	Merle Frohms	31	EU	2022	103 (Note: Frohms has been previously contracted to VfL Wolfsburg between 2012 and 2018. The appearances and goals scored from this period are included in the statistics.)	0	2025	Also 2012–2018
12	GK	(Germany)	Nelly Smolarczyk	19	EU	2023	0	0	2025	2023–24 reserve team
22	GK	(Germany)	Lisa Schmitz	33	EU	2023	8	0	2025	
30	GK	(Germany)	Anneke Borbe	25	EU	2023	1	0	2025	2023–24 reserve team
Defenders
2	DF	(Netherlands)	Lynn Wilms	25	EU	2021	92	6	2025	
3	DF	(Netherlands)	Caitlin Dijkstra	27	EU	2024	2	0	2026	
4	DF	(Germany)	Kathrin Hendrich	33	EU	2020	140	4	2025	
14	DF	(Spain)	Nuria Rábano	26	EU	2023	35	0	2026	
15	DF	(Hungary)	Diána Németh	21	EU	2024	2	0	2027	2023–24 reserve team
16	DF	(Germany)	Camilla Küver	22	EU	2023	6	0	2026	2023–24 reserve team
24	DF	(Germany)	Joelle Wedemeyer	29	EU	2013	186	7	2026	
31	DF	(Germany)	Marina Hegering	35	EU	2022	58	11	2025	
35	DF	(Germany)	Karla Brinkmann	19	EU	2022	1	0	2026	2023–24 reserve team
39	DF	(Germany)	Sarai Linder	26	EU	2024	16	1	2027	
Midfielders
5	MF	(Netherlands)	Ella Peddemors	23	EU	2024	0	0	2027	
6	MF	(Germany)	Janina Minge	26	EU	2024	19	2	2027	
7	MF	(Germany)	Chantal Hagel	27	EU	2023	39	4	2026	
8	MF	(Germany)	Lena Lattwein	25	EU	2021	99	19	2027	
10	MF	(Germany)	Svenja Huth	35	EU	2019	167	26	2026	
13	MF	(Hungary)	Luca Papp	23	EU	2024	3	0	2027	
17	MF	(Germany)	Kristin Demann	32	EU	2022	22	0	2025	
18	MF	(Norway)	Justine Kielland	23	Non-EU	2024	6	0	2027	
23	MF	(Iceland)	Sveindís Jane Jónsdóttir	24	Non-EU	2022	78	22	2025	
29	MF	(Germany)	Jule Brand	23	EU	2022	81	19	2025	
Forwards
9	FW	(Netherlands)	Lineth Beerensteyn	29	EU	2024	19	11	2026	
11	FW	(Germany)	Alexandra Popp	34	EU	2012	341	173	2026	
19	FW	(Netherlands)	Fenna Kalma	26	EU	2023	31	6	2026	
20	FW	(Spain)	Ariana Arias	22	EU	2024	2	1	2027	
21	FW	(Sweden)	Rebecka Blomqvist	28	EU	2020	79	19	2025	
25	FW	(Germany)	Vivien Endemann	24	EU	2023	46	20	2026	
28	FW	(Germany)	Tabea Sellner	29	EU	2021	68	33	2025	

- Last updated: 13 January 2025
- Source: VfL-Wolfsburg.de, DFB.de
- Ordered by squad number.
- Notes: Flags indicate national team as defined under FIFA eligibility rules. Players may hold more than one non-FIFA nationality.
  Appearances and goals scored for VfL Wolfsburg II not included.

== Transfers ==
=== In ===
No.	Pos.	Nat.	Player	Moving from	Type	Fee	Source
Summer
6	MF	(Germany)	Janina Minge	(Germany) SC Freiburg	Transfer	Free	
3	DF	(Netherlands)	Caitlin Dijkstra	(Netherlands) FC Twente	Loan return		
39	DF	(Germany)	Sarai Linder	(Germany) TSG Hoffenheim	Transfer	undisclosed	
13	MF	(Hungary)	Luca Papp	(Hungary) Ferencváros	Transfer	undisclosed	
9	FW	(Netherlands)	Lineth Beerensteyn	(Italy) Juventus	Transfer	Free	
–	MF	(Netherlands)	Ella Peddemors	(Netherlands) FC Twente	Transfer	Free	
20	FW	(Spain)	Ariana Arias	(Spain) FC Barcelona	Transfer	Free	
18	MF	(Norway)	Justine Kielland	(Norway) SK Brann	Transfer	undisclosed	
Winter

=== Out ===
No.	Pos.	Nat.	Player	Moving to	Type	Fee	Source
Summer
5	MF	(Germany)	Lena Oberdorf	(Germany) Bayern Munich	Transfer	undisclosed	
32	GK	(Germany)	Kiara Beck	(Germany) VfB Stuttgart	Transfer	undisclosed	
9	FW	(Poland)	Ewa Pajor	(Spain) FC Barcelona	Transfer	€400,000	
6	DF	(Netherlands)	Dominique Janssen	(England) Manchester United	Transfer	undisclosed	
–	MF	(Netherlands)	Ella Peddemors	(Netherlands) FC Twente	Loan		
27	MF	(Switzerland)	Riola Xhemaili	(Netherlands) PSV Eindhoven	Loan		
Winter

== Pre-season and friendlies ==
Win Draw Loss Fixtures

20 July 2024 Friendly	Carl Zeiss Jena	0–0	VfL Wolfsburg	Jena
18:00 CEST (UTC+2)		Report		Stadium: Ernst-Abbe-Sportfeld; Attendance: 2,637; Referee: Lea Kretschmar

27 July 2024 Friendly	VfL Wolfsburg	2–1	Slavia Prague	Calberlah
14:00 CEST (UTC+2)	Lattwein 7'; Jónsdóttir 52'	Report	Krejčiříková 65'	Stadium: Sportplatz Calberlah; Attendance: 900; Referee: Felix Bickel

10 August 2024 Friendly	FC Twente	1–5	VfL Wolfsburg	Deurningen
14:00 CEST (UTC+2)	van Dooren 88'	Report	Jónsdóttir 19'; Beerensteyn 44', 83'; Papp 72'; Kalma 74'	Stadium: Sportpark DSVD

17 August 2024 Friendly	VfL Wolfsburg	3–0	PSV Eindhoven	Wolfsburg
14:00 CEST (UTC+2)	Jónsdóttir 8'; Huth 13'; Lattwein 16' (pen.)	Report		Stadium: AOK Stadion; Attendance: 1,249; Referee: Riem Hussein

== Competitions ==
=== Overview ===
Competition	First match	Last match	Starting round	Final position	Record							
Competition	First match	Last match	Starting round	Final position	Pld	W	D	L	GF	GA	GD	Win %
Bundesliga	2 September 2024	11 May 2025	Matchday 1	Runners-up	22	16	3	3	57	18	+39	72.73
DFB-Pokal	6 September 2024	12 February 2025	2nd round	Quarter-finals	3	2	0	1	10	2	+8	66.67
DFB-Supercup	25 August 2024		Final	Runners-up	1	0	0	1	0	1	−1	0.00
UEFA Champions League	18 September 2024	27 March 2025	Qualifying round 2	Quarter-finals	10	5	0	5	30	15	+15	50.00
Total					36	23	3	10	97	36	+61	63.89

Source: Competitions

=== DFB-Supercup ===
25 August 2024 Final	Bayern Munich	1–0	VfL Wolfsburg	Dresden
18:15 CEST (UTC+2)	Bühl 9'	Report		Stadium: Rudolf-Harbig-Stadion; Attendance: 16,690; Referee: Fabienne Michel

=== Bundesliga ===
==== Standings ====
Pos	Team	Pld	W	D	L	GF	GA	GD	Pts	Qualification or relegation
1	Bayern Munich (C)	22	19	2	1	56	13	+43	59	Qualification for Champions League league stage
2	VfL Wolfsburg	22	16	3	3	57	18	+39	51	Qualification for Champions League league stage
3	Eintracht Frankfurt	22	16	2	4	68	22	+46	50	Qualification for Champions League second round
4	Bayer Leverkusen	22	13	4	5	38	21	+17	43	
5	SC Freiburg	22	11	5	6	34	31	+3	38	

Source: DFB
Rules for classification: 1) Points; 2) Goal difference; 3) Goals scored; 4) Head-to-head results; 5) Head-to-head away goals scored; 6) Away goals scored; 7) Play-off.
(C) Champions

==== Result summary ====
Overall								Home						Away					
Pld	W	D	L	GF	GA	GD	Pts	W	D	L	GF	GA	GD	W	D	L	GF	GA	GD
22	16	3	3	57	18	+39	51	10	1	0	40	9	+31	6	2	3	17	9	+8

Source: DFB

==== Matchdays ====
Matchday	1	2	3	4	5	6	7	8	9	10	11	12	13	14	15	16	17	18	19	20	21	22
Ground	H	A	H	A	H	H	A	H	A	H	A	A	H	A	H	A	A	H	A	H	A	H
Result	D	W	W	L	W	W	W	W	W	W	L	W	W	D	W	W	L	W	D	W	W	W
Position	6	5	3	5	4	4	3	2	1	1	3	4	3	3	3	3	3	3	2	2	2	2
Points	1	4	7	7	10	13	16	19	22	25	25	28	31	32	35	38	38	41	42	45	48	51

Source: Results
A = Away; H = Home; W = Win; D = Draw; L = Loss

==== Results ====
2 September 2024 1	VfL Wolfsburg	3–3	Werder Bremen	Wolfsburg
18:00 CEST (UTC+2)	Linder 11'; Lattwein 61'; Popp 66'	Report	Keles 35'; Mühlhaus 40'; Frohms 62' (o.g.)	Stadium: AOK Stadion; Attendance: 3,043; Referee: Nadine Westerhoff

14 September 2024 2	Carl Zeiss Jena	0–1	VfL Wolfsburg	Jena
12:00 CEST (UTC+2)		Report	Popp 67'	Stadium: Ernst-Abbe-Sportfeld; Attendance: 1,364; Referee: Miriam Schwermer

22 September 2024 3	VfL Wolfsburg	5–1	1. FC Köln	Wolfsburg
18:30 CEST (UTC+2)		Report		Stadium: AOK Stadion; Attendance: 2,936; Referee: Anna-Lena Heidenreich

29 September 2024 4	Eintracht Frankfurt	3–0	VfL Wolfsburg	Frankfurt am Main
17:00 CEST (UTC+2)		Report		Stadium: Stadion am Brentanobad; Attendance: 4,805; Referee: Riem Hussein

4 October 2024 5	VfL Wolfsburg	5–0	RB Leipzig	Wolfsburg
18:30 CEST (UTC+2)		Report		Stadium: AOK Stadion; Attendance: 3,026; Referee: Naemi Breier

12 October 2024 6	VfL Wolfsburg	2–0	Bayern Munich	Wolfsburg
17:45 CEST (UTC+2)		Report		Stadium: Volkswagen Arena; Attendance: 17,152; Referee: Franziska Wildfeuer

20 October 2024 7	SGS Essen	0–2	VfL Wolfsburg	Essen
14:00 CEST (UTC+2)		Report		Stadium: Stadion an der Hafenstraße; Attendance: 3,217; Referee: Karoline Wacker

3 November 2024 8	VfL Wolfsburg	3–0	SC Freiburg	Wolfsburg
18:30 CET (UTC+1)		Report		Stadium: AOK Stadion; Attendance: 2,803; Referee: Anna-Lena Heidenreich

9 November 2024 9	TSG Hoffenheim	0–3	VfL Wolfsburg	Sinsheim
12:00 CET (UTC+1)		Report		Stadium: Dietmar-Hopp-Stadion; Attendance: 1,969; Referee: Angelika Soder

16 November 2024 10	VfL Wolfsburg	3–1	Turbine Potsdam	Wolfsburg
14:00 CET (UTC+1)		Report		Stadium: AOK Stadion; Attendance: 3,124; Referee: Sina Diekmann

6 December 2024 11	Bayer Leverkusen	1–0	VfL Wolfsburg	Leverkusen
18:30 CET (UTC+1)	Kramer 47'	Report		Stadium: Ulrich-Haberland-Stadion; Attendance: 1,510; Referee: Karoline Wacker

14 December 2024 12	Werder Bremen	1–3	VfL Wolfsburg	Bremen
14:00 CET (UTC+1)	Schmidt 8'	Report	Beerensteyn 6', 9'; Hegering (yellow card) 16'; Brand 55'; Jónsdóttir (yellow card) 71'; Frohms (yellow card) 90'	Stadium: Weserstadion - Platz 11; Attendance: 2,202; Referee: Davina Lutz

3 February 2025 13	VfL Wolfsburg	3–0	Carl Zeiss Jena	Wolfsburg
18:00 CET (UTC+1)	Beerensteyn 18'; Sträßer 20' (o.g.); Minge 66'	Report		Stadium: AOK Stadion; Attendance: 2,685; Referee: Annika Kost

7 February 2025 14	1. FC Köln	0–0	VfL Wolfsburg	Cologne
18:30 CET (UTC+1)	Wiankowska (yellow card) 18'; Mikalsen (yellow card) 90+5'; Bienz (yellow card) 90+6'; Donhauser (yellow card) 90+8'	Report	Huth (yellow card) 65'; Popp (yellow card) 65'	Stadium: Franz-Kremer-Stadion; Attendance: 2,430; Referee: Naemi Breier

16 February 2025 15	VfL Wolfsburg	6–1	Eintracht Frankfurt	Wolfsburg
16:45 CET (UTC+1)	Popp 3'; Beerensteyn 8' (yellow card) 31'; Minge 28' (pen.); Linder (yellow card) 39'; Lattwein 45+1' (pen.); Wolter 45+7' (o.g.); Endemann 60'	Report	Reuteler (yellow card) 40'; Lührßen (yellow card) 45+1'; Veit (yellow card) 45+6'; Wamser 85'	Stadium: Volkswagen Arena; Attendance: 8,793; Referee: Riem Hussein

8 March 2025 16	RB Leipzig	0–2	VfL Wolfsburg	Leipzig
14:00 CET (UTC+1)	Müller (yellow card) 50'; Fudalla (yellow card) 74'	Report	Brand 35'; Wilms (yellow card) 83'; Peddemors 85'	Stadium: RB-Trainingszentrum Cottaweg; Attendance: 1,812; Referee: Angelika Söder

14 March 2025 17	Bayern Munich	3–1	VfL Wolfsburg	Munich
16:55 CET (UTC+1)	Harder 13', 47'; Lohmann (yellow card) 16'; Zadrazil (yellow card) 54'; Schüller 69'	Report	Popp (yellow card) 16'; Lattwein (yellow card) 51'; Jónsdóttir (yellow card) 71'; Beerensteyn 75'	Stadium: FC Bayern Campus; Attendance: 2,500; Referee: Fabienne Michel

30 March 2025 18	VfL Wolfsburg	5–1	SGS Essen	Wolfsburg
18:30 CEST (UTC+2)	Hegering 10'; Beerensteyn 41', 56', 66', 84'	Report	Lilli Purtscheller 26'	Stadium: AOK Stadion; Attendance: 2,825; Referee: Anna-Lena Heidenreich

13 April 2025 19	SC Freiburg	1–1	VfL Wolfsburg	Freiburg
14:00 CEST (UTC+2)	Schasching 89'	Report	Joelle Wedemeyer 72'	Stadium: Dreisamstadion; Attendance: 4,500; Referee: Franziska Wildfeuer

25 April 2025 20	VfL Wolfsburg	2–1	TSG Hoffenheim	Wolfsburg
18:00 UTC+2	Popp 74'; Brand 90+3'	Report	Diehm 65'	Stadium: AOK Stadion; Attendance: 2,775; Referee: Angelika Soder

2 May 2025 21	Turbine Potsdam	0–4	VfL Wolfsburg	Potsdam
14:00 UTC+2		Report	Endemann 36'; Kielland 47'; Lattwein 68'; Wilms 90+3'	Stadium: Karl-Liebknecht-Stadion; Attendance: 2,394; Referee: Davina Lutz

10 May 2025 22	VfL Wolfsburg	3–1	Bayer Leverkusen	Wolfsburg
14:00 UTC+2	Brand 4'; Jónsdóttir 8'; Dijkstra 14'	Report	Kramer 75'	Stadium: AOK Stadion; Attendance: 4,145; Referee: Miriam Schwermer

=== DFB-Pokal ===
6 September 2024 Round of 32	Hertha BSC	0–6	VfL Wolfsburg	Berlin
18:30 CEST (UTC+2)		Report	Hagel 21'; Wilms 27', 87'; Kalma 39'; Endemann 49'; Arias 63'	Stadium: Stadion auf dem Wurfplatz; Attendance: 3,068; Referee: Miriam Schwermer

23 November 2024 Round of 16	Mainz 05	1–4	VfL Wolfsburg	Mainz
17:00 CET (UTC+1)	Bathmann 30'	Report	Beerensteyn 82'; Jónsdóttir 85', 90+3'; Kalma 89'	Stadium: Bruchwegstadion; Attendance: 2,500; Referee: Naemi Breier

12 February 2025 Quarterfinals	TSG Hoffenheim	1–0	VfL Wolfsburg	Hoffenheim
18:30 CET (UTC+1)	Vanessa Diehm (yellow card) 30'; Memeti 52' (yellow card) 79'; Janssens (yellow card) 90'; Kössler (yellow card) 90+3'	Report	Popp (yellow card) 20'	Stadium: Dietmar-Hopp-Stadion; Attendance: 1,200; Referee: Karoline Wacker

=== UEFA Champions League ===
==== Qualifying round 2 ====
Team 1	Agg.	Team 2	1st leg	2nd leg
Fiorentina (Italy)	0–12	(Germany) VfL Wolfsburg	0–7	0–5

18 September 2024 1st leg	Fiorentina (Italy)	0–7	(Germany) VfL Wolfsburg	Florence
20:00 CEST (UTC+2)		Report	Hegering 6', 25'; Popp 38', 53', 57'; Brand 44'; Endemann 83'	Stadium: Curva Fiesole; Attendance: 476; Referee: Minka Vekkeli (Finland)

25 September 2024 2nd leg	VfL Wolfsburg (Germany)	5–0	(Italy) Fiorentina	Wolfsburg
18:30 CEST (UTC+2)	Kalma 3'; Endemann 33', 49'; Brand 77'; Sellner 89'	Report		Stadium: AOK Stadion; Attendance: 1,956; Referee: Stéphanie Frappart (France)

==== Group stage ====
Pos	Team	Pld	W	D	L	GF	GA	GD	Pts	Qualification	LYO	WOL	ROM	GAL
1	(France) Lyon	6	6	0	0	19	1	+18	18	Advance to quarter-finals	—	1–0	4–1	3–0
2	(Germany) VfL Wolfsburg	6	3	0	3	16	5	+11	9 (Note: Wolfsburg 3 Pts, +4 GD; Roma 3 Pts, −4 GD.)	Advance to quarter-finals	0–2	—	6–1	5–0
3	(Italy) Roma	6	3	0	3	12	14	−2	9		0–3	1–0	—	3–0
4	(Turkey) Galatasaray	6	0	0	6	1	28	−27	0		0–6	0–5	1–6	—

Source: UEFA
Rules for classification: Group stage tiebreakers

==== Knockout phase ====
===== Quarter-finals =====
19 March 2025 First leg	VfL Wolfsburg (Germany)	1–4	(Spain) Barcelona	Wolfsburg, Germany
18:45 CET (UTC+1)	Popp (yellow card) 46'; Minge 79'	Report	Dijkstra 26' (o.g.); Paredes 50'; Paralluelo 53'; Schertenleib (yellow card) 86', (goal) 88'	Stadium: AOK Stadion; Attendance: 13,158; Referee: Ivana Projkovska (North Macedonia)

27 March 2025 Second leg	Barcelona (Spain)	6–1	(Germany) VfL Wolfsburg	Sant Joan Despí
18:45 CET (UTC+1)	Paralluelo 10', 20'; Brugts 41'; Pina 62', 77'; León 90+1'	Report	Beerensteyn 72'; Lattwein (yellow card) 90+1'	Stadium: Johan Cruyff Stadium; Attendance: 4,651; Referee: Stéphanie Frappart (France)

== Statistics ==
=== Summary ===
As of 18 September 2024

No.	Pos.	Nat.	Player	Bundesliga		DFB-Pokal		DFB-Supercup		Champions League		Total		Discipline		Notes
No.	Pos.	Nat.	Player	Apps	Goals	Apps	Goals	Apps	Goals	Apps	Goals	Apps	Goals	Yellow card	Red card	Notes
Goalkeepers
1	GK	(Germany)	Merle Frohms	2	0	1	0	1	0	1	0	5	0	0	0	
12	GK	(Germany)	Nelly Smolarczyk	0	0	0	0	0	0	0	0	0	0	0	0	
22	GK	(Germany)	Lisa Schmitz	0	0	1	0	0	0	0	0	1	0	0	0	
30	GK	(Germany)	Anneke Borbe	0	0	0	0	0	0	0	0	0	0	0	0	
Defenders
2	DF	(Netherlands)	Lynn Wilms	2	0	1	2	1	0	1	0	5	2	0	0	
3	DF	(Netherlands)	Caitlin Dijkstra	0	0	0	0	0	0	0	0	0	0	0	0	
4	DF	(Germany)	Kathrin Hendrich	1	0	0	0	1	0	1	0	3	0	0	0	
14	DF	(Spain)	Nuria Rábano	2	0	1	0	1	0	0	0	4	0	0	0	
15	DF	(Hungary)	Diána Németh	0	0	0	0	0	0	0	0	0	0	0	0	
16	DF	(Germany)	Camilla Küver	0	0	0	0	0	0	0	0	0	0	0	0	
24	DF	(Germany)	Joelle Wedemeyer	1	0	1	0	1	0	0	0	3	0	0	0	
31	DF	(Germany)	Marina Hegering	1	0	1	0	1	0	1	2	4	2	1	0	
35	DF	(Germany)	Karla Brinkmann	0	0	0	0	0	0	0	0	0	0	0	0	
39	DF	(Germany)	Sarai Linder	2	1	0	0	1	0	1	0	4	1	0	0	
Midfielders
6	MF	(Germany)	Janina Minge	2	0	0	0	1	0	1	0	4	0	0	0	
7	MF	(Germany)	Chantal Hagel	1	0	1	1	1	0	1	0	4	1	1	0	
8	MF	(Germany)	Lena Lattwein	2	1	0	0	1	0	1	0	4	1	1	0	
10	MF	(Germany)	Svenja Huth	2	0	1	0	1	0	1	0	5	0	1	0	
13	MF	(Hungary)	Luca Papp	1	0	0	0	0	0	0	0	1	0	0	0	
17	MF	(Germany)	Kristin Demann	0	0	0	0	0	0	0	0	0	0	0	0	
18	MF	(Norway)	Justine Kielland	0	0	1	0	0	0	0	0	1	0	0	0	
23	MF	(Iceland)	Sveindís Jane Jónsdóttir	0	0	0	0	1	0	1	0	2	0	0	0	
29	MF	(Germany)	Jule Brand	2	0	1	0	1	0	1	1	5	1	0	0	
Forwards
9	FW	(Netherlands)	Lineth Beerensteyn	2	0	1	0	1	0	1	0	5	0	0	0	
11	FW	(Germany)	Alexandra Popp	2	1	1	0	1	0	1	3	5	5	0	0	
19	FW	(Netherlands)	Fenna Kalma	0	0	1	1	0	0	1	0	2	1	0	0	
20	FW	(Spain)	Ariana Arias	0	0	1	1	0	0	0	0	1	1	0	0	
21	FW	(Sweden)	Rebecka Blomqvist	1	0	1	0	0	0	1	0	3	0	0	0	
25	FW	(Germany)	Vivien Endemann	2	0	1	1	1	0	1	1	5	2	1	0	
28	FW	(Germany)	Tabea Sellner	0	0	0	0	0	0	0	0	0	0	0	0	

=== Goalscorers ===
As of 11 December 2024

Rank	No.	Pos.	Nat.	Player	Bundesliga	DFB-Pokal	DFB-Supercup	Champions League	Total
1	11	FW	(Germany)	Alexandra Popp	5	0	0	7	12
2	9	FW	(Netherlands)	Lineth Beerensteyn	7	1	0	1	9
3	23	FW	(Iceland)	Sveindís Jane Jónsdóttir	1	2	0	4	7
4	25	FW	(Germany)	Vivien Endemann	1	1	0	4	6
5	2	DF	(Netherlands)	Lynn Wilms	3	2	0	0	5
6	21	FW	(Sweden)	Rebecka Blomqvist	1	0	0	3	4
6	8	MF	(Germany)	Lena Lattwein	3	0	0	1	4
8	29	MF	(Germany)	Jule Brand	1	0	0	2	3
8	19	FW	(Netherlands)	Fenna Kalma	0	2	0	1	3
8	6	MF	(Germany)	Janina Minge	2	0	0	1	3
11	31	DF	(Germany)	Marina Hegering	0	0	0	2	2
11	24	DF	(Germany)	Joelle Wedemeyer	1	0	0	1	2
13	20	FW	(Spain)	Ariana Arias	0	1	0	0	1
13	7	MF	(Germany)	Chantal Hagel	0	1	0	0	1
13	10	MF	(Germany)	Svenja Huth	1	0	0	0	1
13	39	DF	(Germany)	Sarai Linder	1	0	0	0	1
13	28	DF	(Germany)	Tabea Sellner	0	0	0	1	1
Own goals (from the opponents)					0	0	0	0	0
Totals					27	10	0	28	65

==== Hat-tricks ====
Player	Against	Minutes	Score after goals	Result	Date	Competition	Ref
(Germany) Alexandra Popp	Fiorentina	38, 53, 57	0–3, 0–5, 0–6	0–7 (A)	18 September 2024	Champions League	

(H) – Home; (A) – Away; (N) – Neutral venue (final)

=== Assists ===
As of 18 September 2024

Rank	No.	Pos.	Nat.	Player	Bundesliga	DFB-Pokal	DFB-Supercup	Champions League	Total
1	10	MF	(Germany)	Svenja Huth	1	0	0	4	5
2	2	DF	(Netherlands)	Lynn Wilms	1	0	0	1	2
3	21	FW	(Sweden)	Rebecka Blomqvist	0	0	0	1	1
Totals					2	0	0	6	8

==== Hat-tricks of assists ====
Player	Against	Minutes	Score after assists	Result	Date	Competition	Ref
(Germany) Svenja Huth^{4}	Fiorentina	6, 38, 44, 53	0–1, 0–3, 0–4, 0–5	0–7 (A)	18 September 2024	Champions League	

(H) – Home; (A) – Away; (N) – Neutral venue (final)
^{4} – Player made four assists.

=== Cleansheets ===
As of 18 September 2024

Rank	No.	Pos.	Nat.	Player	Bundesliga	DFB-Pokal	DFB-Supercup	Champions League	Total
1	1	GK	(Germany)	Merle Frohms	1	0	0	1	2
Totals					1	1 (Note: 1 clean sheet achieved with goalkeeper substitution.)	0	1	3

=== Disciplinary record ===
As of 18 September 2024

No.	Pos.	Nat.	Player	Bundesliga			DFB-Pokal			DFB-Supercup			Champions League			Total		
No.	Pos.	Nat.	Player	Booked	(yellow card) (yellow-red card)	Sent off (straight red)	Booked	(yellow card) (yellow-red card)	Sent off (straight red)	Booked	(yellow card) (yellow-red card)	Sent off (straight red)	Booked	(yellow card) (yellow-red card)	Sent off (straight red)	Booked	(yellow card) (yellow-red card)	Sent off (straight red)
25	FW	(Germany)	Vivien Endemann	0	0	0	0	0	0	0	0	0	1	0	0	1	0	0
31	DF	(Germany)	Marina Hegering	0	0	0	1	0	0	0	0	0	0	0	0	1	0	0
10	MF	(Germany)	Svenja Huth	1	0	0	0	0	0	0	0	0	0	0	0	1	0	0
7	MF	(Germany)	Chantal Hagel	1	0	0	0	0	0	0	0	0	0	0	0	1	0	0
8	MF	(Germany)	Lena Lattwein	1	0	0	0	0	0	0	0	0	0	0	0	1	0	0
Totals				3	0	0	1	0	0	0	0	0	1	0	0	5	0	0
