= 2025 DFB-Supercup Frauen =

DFB-Supercup Frauen
German Women's Supercup
- Event: DFB-Supercup Frauen
| Bayern Munich | VfL Wolfsburg |
| 4 | 2 |
- Date: 30 August 2025
- Venue: Wildparkstadion, Karlsruhe
- Referee: Riem Hussein
- Attendance: 16,933

The 2025 DFB-supercup, known as Google Pixel Supercup der Frauen for sponsorship reasons, was the eighth iteration of the German women's super cup, contested by the winners of the previous season's top league and national cup competition. The match was played on 30 August 2025 at the Wildparkstadion in Karlsruhe.

As Bayern Munich won both the 2024–25 Bundesliga and the 2024–25 DFB-Pokal, they faced VfL Wolfsburg as the runners-up of the Bundesliga. Munich won the match 4–2 to claim their second title.

== Match ==
30 August 2025
14:00 CEST (UTC+2)

| Bayern Munich | 4–2 | VfL Wolfsburg |
|---|---|---|
| Eriksson 18'; Damnjanović 25'; Schüller 72'; Stanway 78' (pen.) | Report | Endemann 57'; Minge 88' (pen.) |

Wildparkstadion, Karlsruhe
Attendance: 16,933
Referee: Riem Hussein

| Bayern Munich | VfL Wolfsburg |

| GK | 32 | (Germany) Ena Mahmutovic |
| RB | 20 | (Germany) Franziska Kett | (yellow card) 54' |
| CB | 3 | (Denmark) Stine Ballisager |
| CB | 5 | (Sweden) Magdalena Eriksson | (yellow card) 5' | (substituted off) 82' |
| LB | 30 | (Germany) Carolin Simon | (yellow card) 81' |
| CM | 25 | (Austria) Sarah Zadrazil (c) |
| CM | 31 | (England) Georgia Stanway |
| RW | 10 | (Germany) Linda Dallmann | | (substituted off) 62' |
| AM | 18 | (Japan) Momoko Tanikawa | | (substituted off) 62' |
| LW | 9 | (Serbia) Jovana Damnjanović | | (substituted off) 82' |
| CF | 11 | (Germany) Lea Schüller | | (substituted off) 74' |
Substitutes:
| GK | 1 | (Germany) Maria Luisa Grohs |
| FW | 2 | (Canada) Vanessa Gilles | | (substituted on) 82' |
| DF | 6 | (Norway) Tuva Hansen |
| MF | 8 | (Germany) Lena Oberdorf | (yellow card) 86' | (substituted on) 62' |
| MF | 14 | (Germany) Alara Şehitler | | (substituted on) 82' |
| MF | 27 | (Italy) Arianna Caruso |
| FW | 17 | (Germany) Klara Bühl | | (substituted on) 62' |
| FW | 21 | (Denmark) Pernille Harder | | (substituted on) 74' |
| FW | 23 | (Poland) Natalia Padilla |
Manager:
(Spain) José Barcala

| GK | 1 | (Germany) Stina Johannes |
| RB | 24 | (Germany) Joelle Wedemeyer | | (substituted off) 73' |
| CB | 3 | (Netherlands) Caitlin Dijkstra |
| CB | 6 | (Germany) Janina Minge |
| LB | 15 | (Netherlands) Janou Levels |
| CM | 8 | (Germany) Lena Lattwein | | (substituted off) 64' |
| CM | 5 | (Netherlands) Ella Peddemors |
| RW | 25 | (Germany) Vivien Endemann | | (substituted off) 64' |
| AM | 11 | (Germany) Alexandra Popp (c) |
| LW | 10 | (Germany) Svenja Huth | | (substituted off) 84' |
| CF | 9 | (Netherlands) Lineth Beerensteyn |
Substitutes:
| GK | 21 | (Germany) Martina Tufekovic |
| DF | 2 | (Norway) Thea Bjelde | | (substituted on) 73' |
| DF | 16 | (Germany) Camilla Küver |
| DF | 33 | (Spain) Judit Pujols |
| MF | 18 | (Norway) Justine Kielland | (yellow card) 70' (yellow-red card) 76' | (substituted on) 64' |
| FW | 7 | (Australia) Sharn Freier |
| FW | 19 | (France) Kessya Bussy | | (substituted on) 84' |
| FW | 28 | (Germany) Cora Zicai | (yellow card) 83' | (substituted on) 64' |
Manager:
(Germany) Stephan Lerch

Assistant referees:
Jasmin Matysiak
Irina Wehr
Fourth official:
Karoline Wacker
Video assistant referee:
Robert Kampka
Assistant video assistant referee:
Vanessa Kaminski

Match rules

- 90 minutes
- Penalty shoot-out if scores level
- Maximum of nine named substitutes
- Maximum of five substitutions
- Maximum of three substitution opportunities
