= Justine Kielland =

Norwegian footballer (born 2002)

- Kielland in 2026

Personal information
- Full name: Justine Kvaleng Kielland
- Date of birth: 22 November 2002 (age 24)
- Place of birth: Norway
- Height: 1.66 m (5 ft 5 in)
- Position: Defensive midfielder

Team information
- Current team: Aston Villa
- Number: 5

Youth career
- –2015: Fossum
- 2016–2018: Stabæk

Senior career*
Years	Team	Apps	(Gls)
2018–2023	Stabæk	79	(4)
2023–2024	Brann	23	(1)
2024–2026	VfL Wolfsburg	33	(4)
2026–	Aston Villa	11	(0)

International career^{‡}
2020	Norway U18	1	(0)
2022–2023	Norway U23	8	(1)
2024–	Norway	16	(0)
- * Club domestic league appearances and goals as of 22 November 2026 ‡ National team caps and goals as of 5 June 2026

Justine Kvaleng Kielland (born 22 November 2002) is a Norwegian professional footballer who plays as a defensive midfielder for Women's Super League club Aston Villa and the Norway national team.

== Club career ==
Kielland hails from Bærum and started her youth career in Fossum IF before going on to the largest club in the area, Stabæk. She made a breakthrough for Stabæk in the 2020 First Division, and was a key player from the 2021 Toppserien onward. After finishing school at the Norwegian School of Elite Sport in 2021, she started a higher education in Oslo to be able to remain in Stabæk.

She was bought by SK Brann Kvinner in the summer of 2023 on a 3,5 year contract. Not having turned 21 years old, she amassed 80 league matches for Stabæk. During Brann's successful 2023–24 Champions League run, Kielland scored against Glasgow in the qualifying rounds as well as an equalizer against St. Pölten during the group stage.

On 3 July 2026, it was announced that Kielland signed with Women's Super League club Aston Villa.

== International career ==
In October 2023, Kielland was called up for Norway for the first time. She remained unused then, but not long after, she made her full international debut against Croatia, being substituted in at half time.

On 16 June 2025, Kielland was called up to the Norway squad for the UEFA Women's Euro 2025.

== Personal life ==
While at Stabæk, she entered a relationship with men's player Oliver Valaker Edvardsen.

== Career statistics ==
=== Club ===
As of match played 22 November 2026

Appearances and goals by club, season and competition
Club	Season	League			National cup		League cup		Continental		Other		Total	
Club	Season	Division	Apps	Goals	Apps	Goals	Apps	Goals	Apps	Goals	Apps	Goals	Apps	Goals
Stabæk	2018	Toppserien	8	0	0	0	–		–		–		8	0
Stabæk	2019	Toppserien	14	0	0	0	–		–		–		14	0
Stabæk	2020	Toppserien	0	0	1	1	–		–		–		1	1
Stabæk	2021	Toppserien	18	1	1	1	–		–		–		19	2
Stabæk	2022	Toppserien	23	2	3	0	–		–		–		25	2
Stabæk	2023	Toppserien	16	1	0	0	–		–		–		16	1
Stabæk	Total		79	4	5	2	0	0	0	0	0	0	83	6
Brann	2023	Toppserien	10	0	1	0	–		–		–		11	0
Brann	2024	Toppserien	13	1	0	0	–		12 (Note: Appearances in UEFA Women's Champions League)	4	–		25	5
Brann	Total		23	1	1	0	0	0	12	4	0	0	36	5
VfL Wolfsburg	2024–25	Frauen-Bundesliga	10	1	0	0	–		5	0	–		15	1
VfL Wolfsburg	2025–26	Frauen-Bundesliga	23	3	4	1	–		10 (Note: UCL)	0	1 (Note: Appearance in DFB-Supercup Frauen)	0	38	4
VfL Wolfsburg	Total		33	4	4	1	0	0	15	0	0	0	53	5
Aston Villa	2026–27	Women's Super League	11	0	0	0	4	0	–		–		15	0
Career total			146	9	10	3	4	0	27	4	1	0	188	16

=== International ===
As of match played 28 October 2025

Appearances and goals by national team and year
National team	Year	Apps	Goals
Norway	2024	4	0
Norway	2025	5	0
Total		9	0
