= Anne Fühner =

German footballer (born 1995)

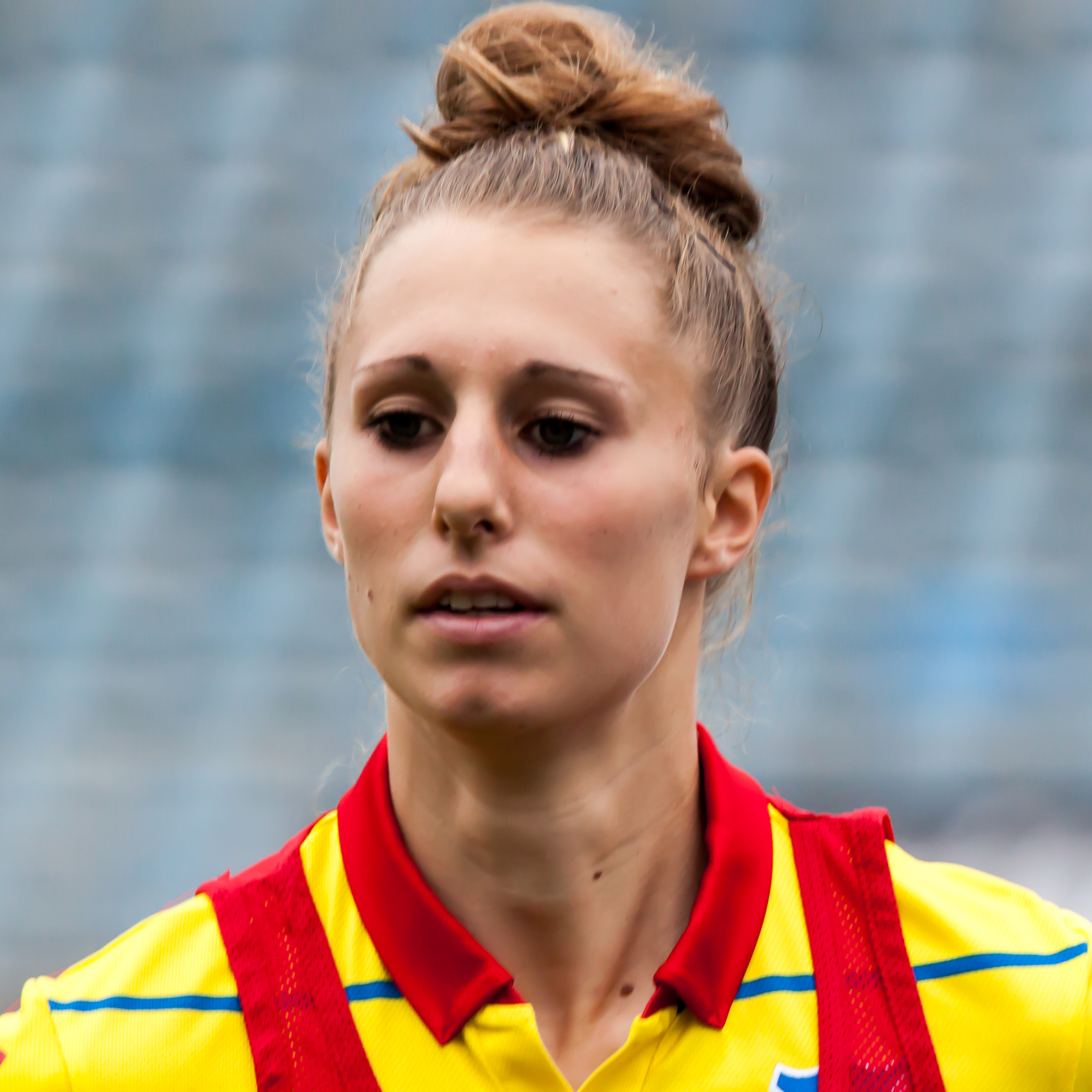
- Fühner in 2014

Personal information
- Date of birth: 10 May 1995 (age 31)
- Place of birth: Kempten, Germany
- Height: 1.67 m (5 ft 6 in)
- Position: Defender

Senior career*
Years	Team	Apps	(Gls)
2012–2022	TSG 1899 Hoffenheim	119	(14)

International career
2010	Germany U15	1	(0)
2011	Germany U16	5	(0)
2011	Germany U17	1	(0)
- * Club domestic league appearances and goals

Anne Fühner (born 10 May 1995) is a German former footballer who played for TSG 1899 Hoffenheim. She made 105 Bundesliga appearances for TSG Hoffenheim and scored 14 goals.
