= Sarai Linder =

German footballer (born 1999)

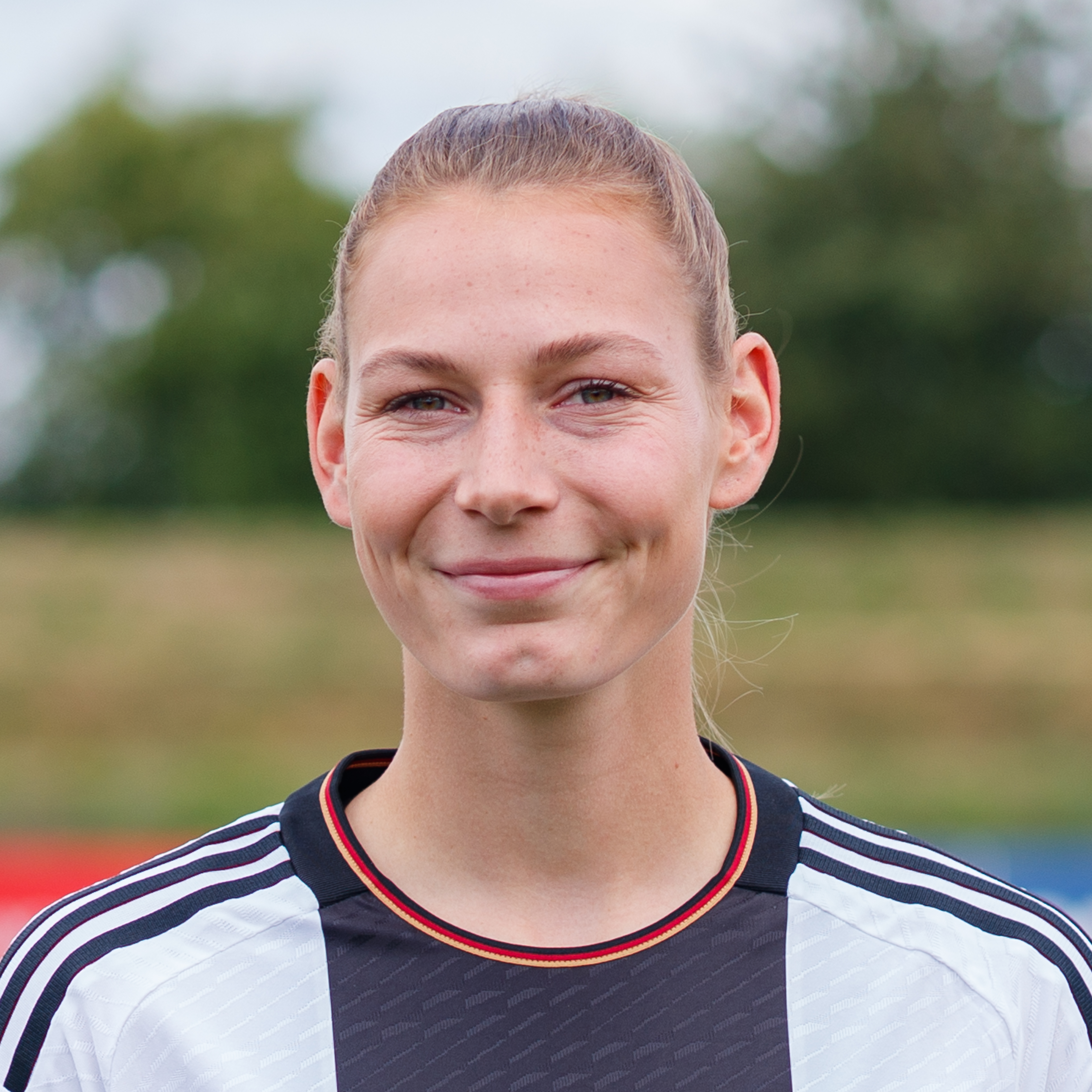
- Linder in 2023

Personal information
- Date of birth: 26 October 1999 (age 27)
- Place of birth: Sinsheim, Germany
- Height: 1.70 m (5 ft 7 in)
- Positions: Defender; midfielder

Team information
- Current team: VfL Wolfsburg
- Number: 39

Youth career
- SV Hilsbach
- 2010–2016: TSG Hoffenheim

College career
| Years | Team | Apps | (Gls) |
| 2020–2021 | UCF Knights | 7 | (0) |

Senior career*
| Years | Team | Apps | (Gls) |
| 2015–2017 | TSG Hoffenheim II | 31 | (7) |
| 2016–2020 | TSG Hoffenheim | 47 | (2) |
| 2021–2024 | TSG Hoffenheim | 64 | (2) |
| 2024– | VfL Wolfsburg | 48 | (2) |

International career^{‡}
| 2013–2014 | Germany U15 | 3 | (0) |
| 2014–2015 | Germany U16 | 10 | (0) |
| 2015–2016 | Germany U17 | 14 | (1) |
| 2016–2018 | Germany U19 | 9 | (0) |
| 2017–2019 | Germany U20 | 7 | (0) |
| 2023– | Germany | 36 | (1) |
Medal record
Olympic Games
| Bronze medal – third place | 2024 Paris | Team |
UEFA Women's Nations League
| Bronze medal – third place | 2024 France–Netherlands–Spain |
- * Club domestic league appearances and goals as of 22 November 2026 ‡ National team caps and goals as of 21:21, 13 October 2026 (UTC)

Sarai Linder (born 26 October 1999) is a German footballer who plays as a defender for VfL Wolfsburg and for the Germany national team.

== Club career ==
Born in Sinsheim, Linder started playing football in the Sinsheimer district club SV Hilsbach and switched to the youth department of TSG Hoffenheim in 2010, to which she belonged until 2016 and in her last season in the southern season of the B-Junior Bundesliga played league games.

For the 2015–16 season, she was promoted to the second team, for which she scored five goals in 15 league games in the 2. Frauen-Bundesliga South. She crowned her senior debut on 30 August 2015 (1st matchday) in a 4–1 win in the home game against 1. FFC Frankfurt II with her first goal, scoring the final score in the 81st minute. The end of the season was celebrated in first place. She made her Bundesliga debut unexpectedly on 30 October 2016 (matchday 6) in a 1–0 away win against Bayer Leverkusen with a substitution in the 88th minute for Anne Fühner. From 2017 to 2020, belonging to the first team, she played in a further 46 league games, in which she scored two goals.

She then spent a year at the University of Central Florida and was welcomed as one of five new additions to the Knights, the varsity athletic team. In the 2020 season, she played seven games from 14 February to 11 April.

Returning to Germany, she played again for TSG Hoffenheim in the Bundesliga from the 2021–22 season.

In the summer 2024 transfer window it has been announced that Linder signed a three year contract with VfL Wolfsburg, a Bundesliga rival of her long-place station, TSG Hoffenheim. Wolfsburg had to pay an estimated €250.000 to Hoffenheim, as Linder's contract originally ran until 2025. She immediately became a mainstay in the starting eleven, with Linder starting 16 Bundesliga games and being subbed on during a further two, in addition to playing in seven of Wolfsburg's Champions League fixtures. In a season which Wolfsburg finished in second place, Linder contributed with a goal and three assists.

== International career ==
Within five years, Linder went through the youth national teams from the age group U15 to U19 before she made her debut for the U20 national team on 18 October 2017 in a 2–0 defeat friendly against Serbia.

With the U17 national team, she took part in the European Championship, which was held in Belarus from 4 to 16 May 2016, played the first and third games, the semi-finals, which Germany won 4–3 against England, and the 3–2 finals won on penalties against Spain.

At the U17 World Cup that same year, she played the first two matches and the quarter-finals, which they lost 2–1 to Spain.

In 2022 Linder was called up to the senior Germany national team.

On 3 July 2024, Linder was called up to the Germany squad for the 2024 Summer Olympics.

On 12 June 2025, Linder was called up to the Germany squad for the UEFA Women's Euro 2025.

== Playing style ==
Linder regularly plays as a right back, but has deputised as a left back during Christian Wück's tenure coaching the German national team. He called her a quick allrounder, who was able to play at left back despite not being naturally left-footed. Wolfsburg's sporting director Ralf Kellermann seconded Linder's positional flexibility, and called her "one of Germany's best defenders" in 2024.

== Career statistics ==
As of 13 October 2026

Appearances and goals by national team and year
Germany
| Year | Apps | Goals |
|---|---|---|
| 2023 | 8 | 0 |
| 2024 | 14 | 0 |
| 2025 | 8 | 1 |
| 2026 | 7 | 0 |
| Total | 36 | 1 |

=== International goals ===
Scores and results list Germany's goal tally first, score column indicates score after each Linder goal.

| No. | Date | Venue | Opponent | Score | Result | Competition |
|---|---|---|---|---|---|---|
| 1 | 30 May 2025 | Bremen, Germany | Netherlands | 4–0 | 4–0 | 2025 UEFA Women's Nations League |

== Honours ==
TSG Hoffenheim

- 2. Frauen-Bundesliga Süd: 2016

Germany U17

- UEFA Women's Under-17 Championship 2016

Germany

- Summer Olympics bronze medal: 2024
- UEFA Women's Nations League third place: 2023–24

Individual

- Silbernes Lorbeerblatt: 2024
