= Sophia Kleinherne =

German footballer

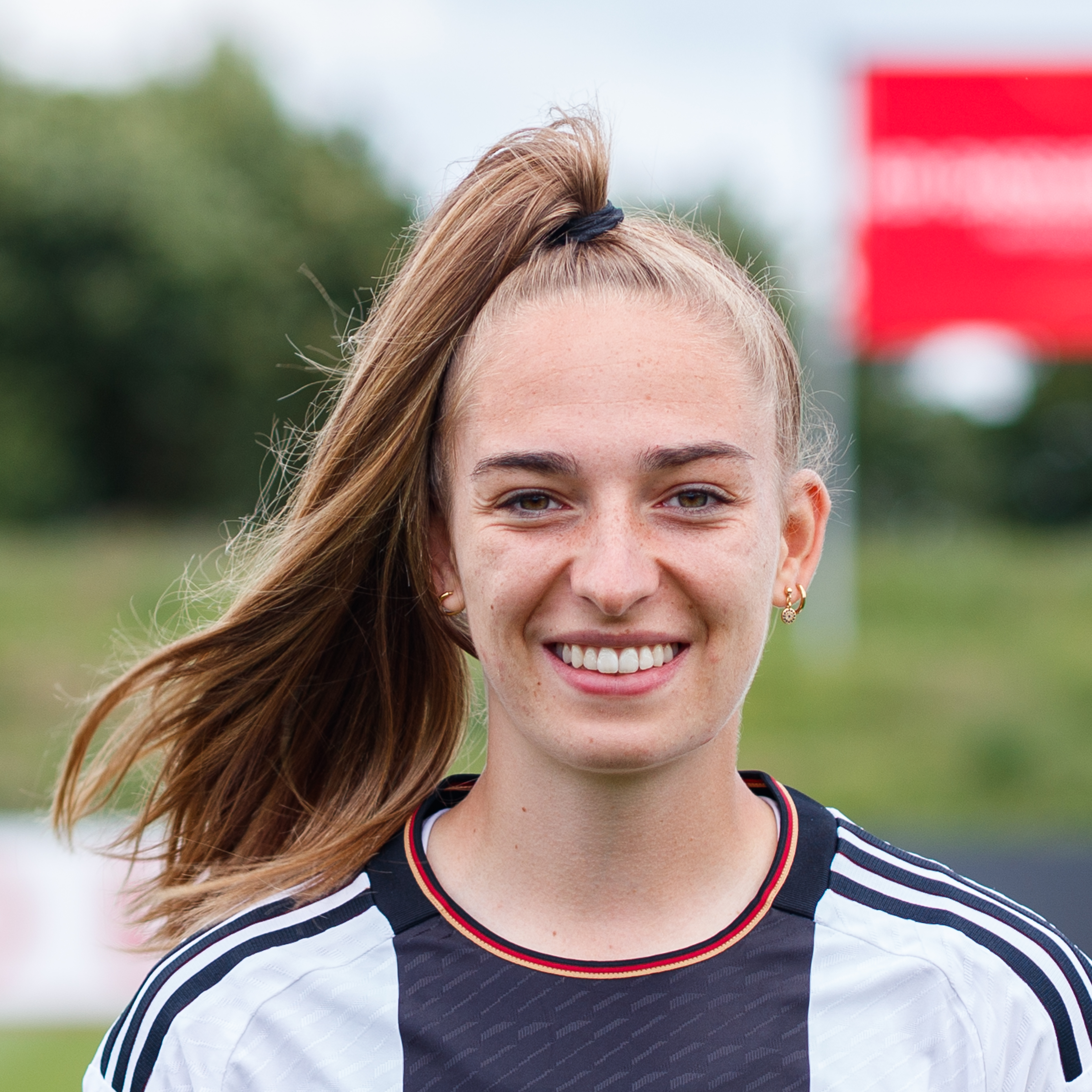
- Kleinherne in 2023.

Personal information
- Full name: Sophia Kleinherne
- Date of birth: 12 April 2000 (age 26)
- Place of birth: Telgte, Germany
- Height: 1.69 m (5 ft 7 in)
- Position: Defender

Team information
- Current team: VfL Wolfsburg
- Number: 4

Youth career
- SG Telgte
- BSV Ostbevern
- 2014–2017: FSV Gütersloh

Senior career*
Years	Team	Apps	(Gls)
2016–2017	FSV Gütersloh	8	(1)
2017	1. FFC Frankfurt II	8	(1)
2018–2025	Eintracht Frankfurt (Note: 1. FFC Frankfurt merged with Eintracht Frankfurt in 2020)	132	(1)
2025–	VfL Wolfsburg	14	(0)
2025–	VfL Wolfsburg II	2	(0)

International career^{‡}
2014–2015	Germany U15	5	(0)
2015	Germany U16	2	(0)
2016	Germany U17	14	(0)
2017–2019	Germany U19	22	(0)
2017–2018	Germany U20	6	(0)
2019–	Germany	39	(1)
Medal record
UEFA Women's Championship
Silver medal – second place	2022 England
UEFA Women's Nations League
Bronze medal – third place	2024 France–Netherlands–Spain
- * Club domestic league appearances and goals as of 22 November 2026 ‡ National team caps and goals as of 23:00, 13 October 2026 (UTC)

Sophia Kleinherne (born 12 April 2000) is a German professional footballer who plays as a defender for Frauen-Bundesliga club VfL Wolfsburg and the Germany national team. She has previously played for Eintracht Frankfurt. In January 2020, Kleinherne was named by UEFA as one of the ten most promising young players in Europe.

== Club career ==
=== Early career ===
Kleinherne first played for SG Telgte and BSV Ostbevern before moving to the youth department of FSV Gütersloh in 2009. There she competed with the B-Juniors in the Bundesliga West/Southwest and reached the finals of the German Championship with her team in both 2015 and 2016. In 2015, she won the U18 national cup held in Duisburg with the Westphalia selection. In the 2016/17 season, she also made her first two appearances for the FSV team in the 2nd Bundesliga Northand scored a goal.

=== Eintracht Frankfurt ===
For the 2017/18 season, she moved from Gütersloh to 1. FFC Frankfurt II in the 2nd Bundesliga South, but was promoted to the squad of the Bundesliga team during the winter break. After this change of club and association, Kleinherne won the U18 national cup again in 2017, this time with the U18 Hessen selection. She made her debut in the Bundesliga on 11 February 2018 (matchday 10), when she played the full game time in the 0–1 home defeat against SGS Essen. In July 2020, 1. FFC Frankfurt was integrated into Eintracht Frankfurt, thus forming the club's women's football department.

In December 2021, Kleinherne extended her contract with Eintracht Frankfurt through June 2024. On 29 October 2022, Kleinherne scored her first Bundesliga goal in her 100th Bundesliga game, against TSG 1899 Hoffenheim.

After the 2024–25 Bundesliga season, Kleinherne was considered as one of the league's top five central defenders by online magazine 90min, being praised particularly for her accurate passing.

=== VfL Wolfsburg ===
Using an exit clause in her contract, Kleinherne terminated her contract with Eintracht Frankfurt early in June 2025 and moved to VfL Wolfsburg. She missed the first few months of the season due to a thigh injury sustained at the UEFA Euro 2025, before making her first-team debut in a 6–1 win over 1. FC Nürnberg.

== International career ==
Kleinherne made her national team debut on 28 October 2014 in the 13–0 victory of the U15 national team against Scotland. After two appearances for the U16 national team in 2015, she was already part of the U17 national team in 2016 and took part in the European Championship with them. She played in all five tournament games in Belarus and became European champion with a final win (3–2 on penalties) against Spain. At the U17 World Cup in the same year, she was also part of the German squad, was a regular player, as at the European Championships, and reached the quarter-finals with the team. In the spring of 2017 followed the debut in the U19 national team, with which they qualified for the European Championship in Northern Ireland in the same year, where they played in two group games and the semi-finals, which they lost 2–1 to France. On 18 October 2017, Kleinherne made her debut for the U20 national team. At the 2019 U19 European Championship in Scotland, she captained Germany to the final, which they narrowly lost to France. Kleinherne was named to the team of the tournament.

On 9 November 2019, she made her senior debut in a friendly against England at London's Wembley Stadium in front of a crowd of over 77,000. Kleinherne played the entire game at left-back, which Germany won 2–1.

For the Euro 2022 in England, she was called up to the squad by the national coach Martina Voss-Tecklenburg. Kleinherne played in three games and scored her first international goal.

On 12 June 2025, Kleinherne was called up to the Germany squad for the UEFA Women's Euro 2025.

== Personal life ==
In addition to her football career, Kleinherne is studying sports management at a distance learning university and is a soldier in the German Army (Bundeswehr), currently in the rank of a Hauptgefreiter (higher private).

== Career statistics ==
As of 13 October 2026

Appearances and goals by national team and year
National team	Year	Apps	Goals
Germany	2019	1	0
Germany	2020	2	0
Germany	2021	9	0
Germany	2022	11	1
Germany	2023	4	0
Germany	2024	3	0
Germany	2025	6	0
Germany	2026	3	0
Total		39	1

Scores and results list Germany's goal tally first, score column indicates score after each Kleinherne goal.

List of international goals scored by Sophia Kleinherne
No.	Date	Venue	Opponent	Score	Result	Competition
1	16 July 2022	Milton Keynes, England	Finland	1–0	3–0	UEFA Women's Euro 2022

== Honours ==
Germany Youth

- UEFA Women's Under-17 Championship: 2016
- UEFA Women's Under-19 Championship runner-up: 2019

Germany

- UEFA Women's Championship runner-up: 2022
- UEFA Women's Nations League third place: 2023–24

Individual

- Fritz Walter Medal (best U17 player) in bronze: 2017
- Fritz Walter Medal in Silver: 2018
