= Thea Bjelde =

Norwegian footballer (born 2000)

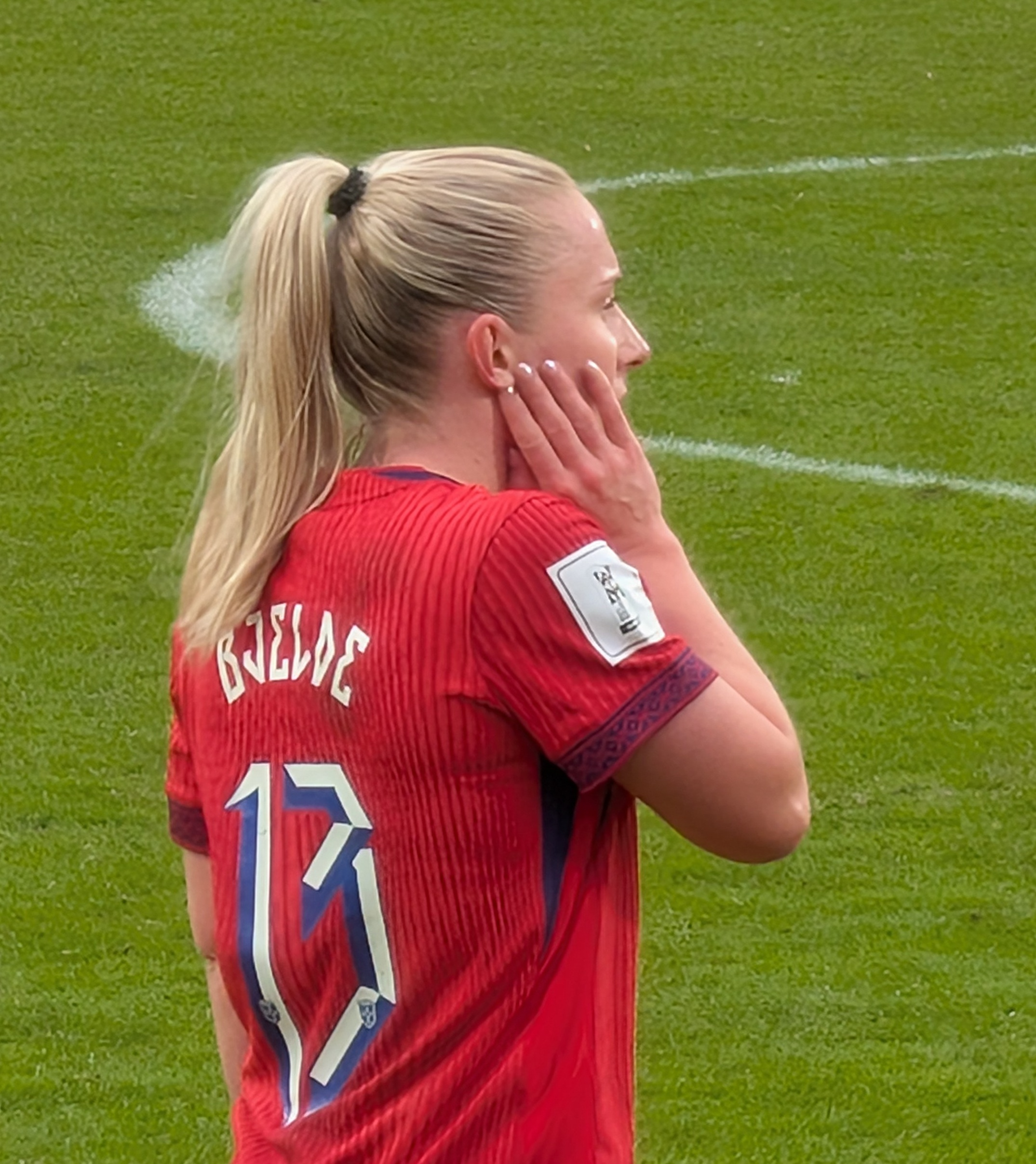
- Thea Bjelde in 2025

Personal information
- Date of birth: 5 June 2000 (age 26)
- Place of birth: Sogndal, Norway
- Height: 1.66 m (5 ft 5 in)
- Positions: Midfielder; right-back

Team information
- Current team: VfL Wolfsburg
- Number: 2

Senior career*
Years	Team	Apps	(Gls)
2015	Sogndal		
2016	Kaupanger	11	(9)
2016–2021	Arna-Bjørnar	62	(2)
2021–2025	Vålerenga	88	(14)
2025–	VfL Wolfsburg	28	(0)
2025	VfL Wolfsburg II	1	(0)

International career^{‡}
2015	Norway U15	4	(4)
2016	Norway U16	12	(2)
2017	Norway U17	11	(0)
2017–2019	Norway U19	21	(1)
2021–2022	Norway U23	4	(0)
2022–	Norway	40	(2)
- * Club domestic league appearances and goals as of 22 November 2026 ‡ National team caps and goals as of 14 October 2026

Thea Bjelde (born 5 June 2000) is a Norwegian professional footballer who plays as defender for Bundesliga club VfL Wolfsburg and the Norway national team.

== Club career ==
=== Early career ===
Bjelde started her career with Sogndal Fotball, where she distinguished herself as the only girl on the under-14 team in the Norway Cup. In early 2016, she joined Kaupanger in the 2nd division.

=== Arna-Bjørnar (2016–2021) ===
As a 16-year-old, she was brought to Arna-Bjørnar in the Toppserien. In 2018, the breakthrough came when Bjelde had a fantastic season, and was an important piece in the team that won bronze in the Toppserien. She was voted player of the year in Arna-Bjørnar, and nominated for breakthrough of the year in 2022 in the Toppserien.

In early 2019, she suffered a cruciate ligament injury that put her out of football for a year. After returning from the injury, she bounced back strongly the following year, and was rewarded by being selected for the senior national team for the first time. She was also named player of the year in Arna-Bjørnar in 2020. As a 21-year-old, she was appointed captain in Arna-Bjørnar.

=== Vålerenga (2021–2025) ===
On 18 July 2021, she signed for Vålerenga. With Vålerenga, she helped win the cup championship in her first season, and she was voted best on the pitch in the cup final against Sandviken.

In the summer of 2023, she extended her contract with Vålerenga. She was an important part of the team that took series gold for Vålerenga. Bjelde was selected for the "team of the year" and nominated for "player of the year" in 2023 Toppserien.

== International career ==
Bjelde has international matches for U15, U16, U17, U19, U23, and the senior national team for Norway.

She was selected for the senior Norwegian national team for the first time in October 2020.

After a decline in the Norwegian squad, Bjelde was called up to the team that was going to the European Championship in England 2022.

Bjelde made her debut for the senior national team on 7 October 2022, in a private international match against Brazil at Ullevaal Stadium.

On 19 June 2023, she was included in the 23-player Norwegian squad for the FIFA Women's World Cup 2023. She played in all games.

On 16 June 2025, Bjelde was called up to the Norway squad for the UEFA Women's Euro 2025.

== International goals ==
No.	Date	Venue	Opponent	Score	Result	Competition
1	5 April 2024	Ullevaal Stadion, Oslo, Norway	Finland	3–0	4–0	UEFA Women's Euro 2025 qualifying
2	9 June 2026	Ullevaal Stadion, Oslo, Norway	Austria	1–0	2–1	2027 FIFA World Cup qualification
