= Cornelia Kramer =

Danish footballer

Personal information
- Full name: Cornelia Carmen Kramer Moltke Jensen
- Date of birth: 16 December 2002 (age 23)
- Place of birth: Aalborg, Denmark
- Height: 1.67 m (5 ft 6 in)
- Position: Forward

Team information
- Current team: Bayer Leverkusen
- Number: 7

Senior career*
Years	Team	Apps	(Gls)
2019–2021	AaB		
2021–2024	HB Køge	61	(21)
2024–	Bayer Leverkusen	46	(21)

International career^{‡}
2017–2018	Denmark U16	7	(8)
2018–2019	Denmark U17	12	(12)
2019–2020	Denmark U19	6	(2)
2023–	Denmark U23	6	(2)
2024–	Denmark	6	(1)
- * Club domestic league appearances and goals as of 20 November 2026 ‡ National team caps and goals as of 21:19, 7 October 2026 (UTC)

Cornelia Carmen Kramer Moltke Jensen (born 16 December 2002) is a Danish professional footballer who plays as a forward for Frauen-Bundesliga club Bayer Leverkusen and the Denmark national team. She previously played for HB Køge, where she played 75 league games for the club and scored 27 goals in the Elitedivisionen.

== International career ==
Kramer has represented Denmark at youth and senior level.

== Career statistics ==
=== International ===
As of match played 18 April 2026

Appearances and goals by national team and year
National team	Year	Apps	Goals
Denmark
Denmark	2024	1	1
Denmark	2025	4	0
Denmark	2026	1	0
Total		6	1

Scores and results list Denmark's goal tally first, score column indicates score after each Kramer goal.

List of international goals scored by Cornelia Kramer
No.	Date	Venue	Opponent	Score	Result	Competition
1	29 October 2024	Esbjerg Stadium, Esbjerg, Denmark	Netherlands	1–2	1–2	Friendly
