= Nina Lührßen =

German footballer (born 1999)

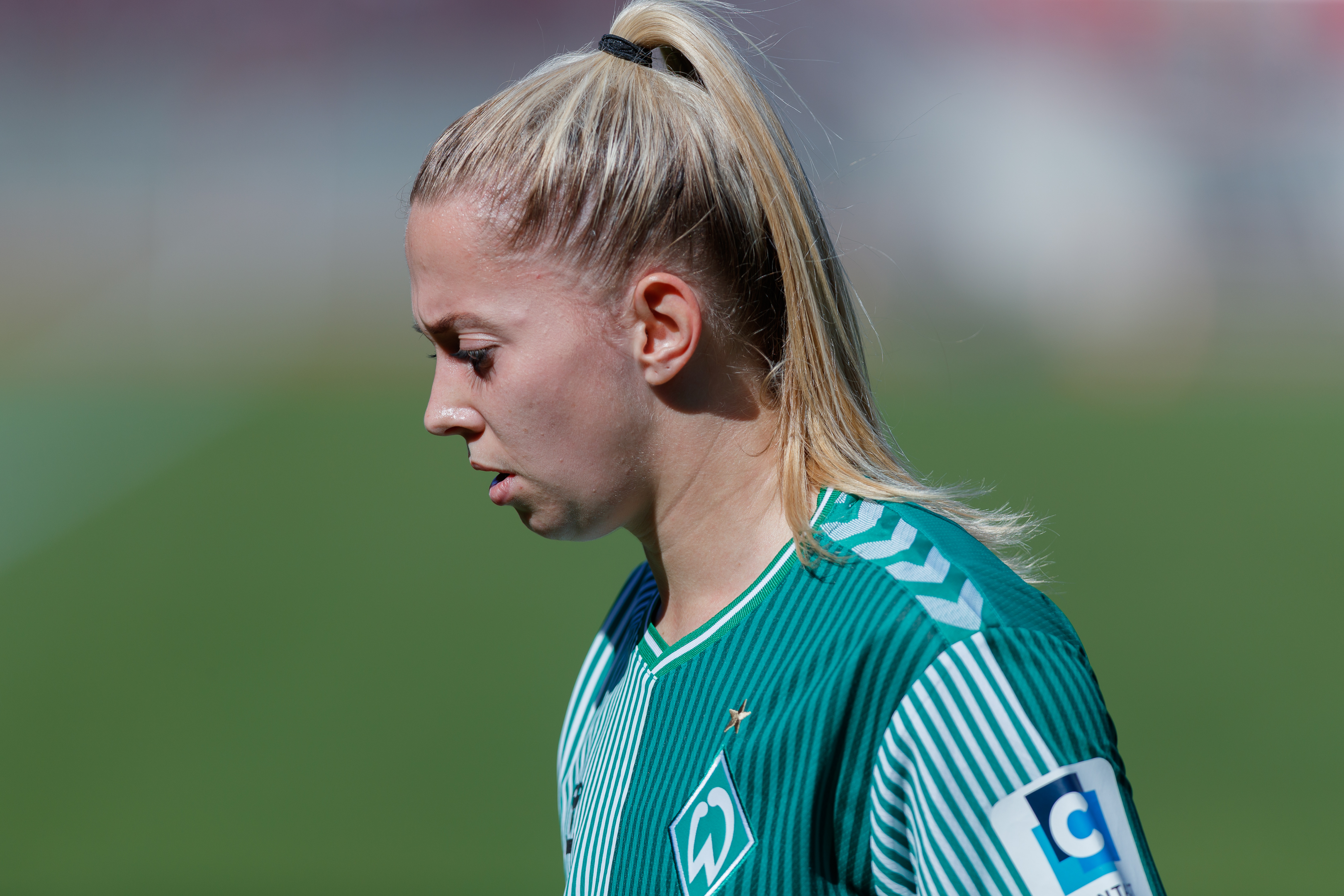
- Lührßen in 2023 at Werder Bremen

Personal information
- Date of birth: 21 November 1999 (age 27)
- Place of birth: Bremen, Germany
- Height: 1.65 m (5 ft 5 in)
- Position: Left-back

Team information
- Current team: Eintracht Frankfurt
- Number: 11

Youth career
- Werder Bremen

Senior career*
| Years | Team | Apps | (Gls) |
| 2016–2024 | Werder Bremen | 126 | (16) |
| 2024– | Eintracht Frankfurt | 53 | (3) |

International career
| 2014–2015 | Germany U16 | 4 | (0) |
| | Germany U17 | 3 | (0) |
| 2017–2018 | Germany U19 | 6 | (1) |
- * Club domestic league appearances and goals as of 21 November 2026

Nina Lührßen (born 21 November 1999) is a German footballer who plays as a left-back for Frauen-Bundesliga club Eintracht Frankfurt.
