= Janou Levels =

Dutch footballer (born 2000)

Personal information
- Full name: Janou Johanna Theodora Levels
- Date of birth: 30 October 2000 (age 26)
- Place of birth: Roermond, Netherlands
- Position: Defender

Team information
- Current team: Real Madrid
- Number: 3

Senior career*
Years	Team	Apps	(Gls)
c. 2014–2018	CTO		
2018–2023	PSV	87	(1)
2023–2025	Bayer Leverkusen	35	(2)
2025–2026	VfL Wolfsburg	21	(3)
2026–	Real Madrid	8	(0)

International career^{‡}
2016–2017	Netherlands U17	7	(0)
2018–2019	Netherlands U19	16	(0)
2019–	Netherlands U23	14	(0)
2021–	Netherlands	7	(0)
- * Club domestic league appearances and goals as of 16:17, 21 November 2026 (UTC) ‡ National team caps and goals as of 16:17, 21 November 2026 (UTC)

Janou Levels (born 30 October 2000) is a Dutch professional football player who plays as a defender for Liga F club Real Madrid and the Netherlands national team. Levels has captained the Netherlands women's national under-23 team. She previously played for Dutch teams CTO and PSV.

== Club career ==
Levels started playing football at the age of five for SHH Herten. At the age of 14, she moved to CTO in Eindhoven.

At the age of 17, Levels signed for PSV ahead of the 2018–19 Eredivisie season. She was a part of the PSV team that lost the 2020 Eredivisie Cup Final to FC Twente. In April 2020, she signed a new contract with PSV. In the 2020–21 KNVB Women's Cup Final against ADO Den Haag, Levels conceded a peculiar penalty for handball. The ball touched her hand in the 18-yard box, when she raised it to appeal for supposed handball by her opponent. Nevertheless, PSV won the match 1–0, and earned their first major honour. In April 2021, she signed a new three-year contract with the club. In total, she made 117 appearances for PSV in five seasons with the club. In June 2023, Levels was transferred to Frauen-Bundesliga club Bayer Leverkusen.

On 11 July 2026, it was announced that Levels had signed a four-year deal with Liga F club Real Madrid until June 2030.

== International career ==
In October 2021, Levels was named to the Netherlands women's national football team for the first time. The next month, she made her senior debut in a match against Japan. She was in the Dutch squad for three matches in February 2022.

== Personal life ==
Levels grew up in Herten, Netherlands. She is the daughter of Jo Levels, who played for VVV-Venlo.
