= Kessya Bussy =

French footballer (born 2001)

Personal information
- Date of birth: 19 June 2001 (age 25)
- Place of birth: Orléans, France
- Height: 1.65 m (5 ft 5 in)
- Position: Forward

Team information
- Current team: VfL Wolfsburg
- Number: 19

Youth career
- 2008–2016: SMOC Saint-Jean-de-Braye
- 2016–2017: Orléans

Senior career*
Years	Team	Apps	(Gls)
2017–2020	Orléans	36	(13)
2020–2023	Reims	58	(19)
2023–2025	Paris FC	40	(18)
2025–	VfL Wolfsburg	26	(9)

International career^{‡}
2017	France U16	7	(0)
2017–2018	France U17	4	(2)
2019–2020	France U19	18	(2)
2019	France U20	4	(1)
2022–2025	France U23	14	(4)
2021–	France	11	(1)
Medal record
Women's football
Representing France
UEFA Women's Nations League
Third place	2025
UEFA Women's Under-19 Championship
Winner	2019 Scotland
- * Club domestic league appearances and goals as of 22 November 2026 ‡ National team caps and goals as of 7 March 2026

Kessya Bussy (born 19 June 2001) is a French professional footballer who plays as a forward for Frauen-Bundesliga club VfL Wolfsburg and the France national team.

== Club career ==
Bussy started her senior career with Orléans. Following a good season with the club in Seconde Ligue, she joined Reims in June 2020. She scored five goals and provided five assists in 22 matches in her first season with Reims. Her performance didn't go unnoticed as she was nominated for Best Young Player at the Trophées UNFP du football and FFF D1 Arkema awards.

In June 2023, Bussy joined Paris FC on a two-year deal until June 2025. On 3 July 2025, German club VfL Wolfsburg announced the signing of Bussy on a three-year contract.

== International career ==
Bussy is a former France youth international. She was a member of under-19 team which won the 2019 UEFA Women's Under-19 Championship.

In June 2021, Bussy received her first call-up to the France national team. She made her debut on 10 June 2021 in a 1–0 win against Germany. She scored her first goal for the national team on 18 February 2023 in a 5–1 win against Uruguay.

== Career statistics ==
=== International ===
As of match played 7 March 2026

Appearances and goals by national team and year
National team	Year	Apps	Goals
France	2021	3	0
France	2022	2	0
France	2023	1	1
France	2025	4	0
France	2026	1	0
Total		11	1

Scores and results list France's goal tally first, score column indicates score after each Bussy goal.

List of international goals scored by Kessya Bussy
No.	Date	Venue	Opponent	Score	Result	Competition
1	18 February 2023	Stade Raymond Kopa, Angers, France	Uruguay	1–0	5–1	2023 Tournoi de France

== Honours ==
Paris FC

- Coupe de France Féminine: 2024–25

France U19

- UEFA Women's Under-19 Championship: 2019

Individual

- LFFP Première Ligue team of the season: 2024–25
- Première Ligue Player of the Month: January 2025
