= AOK Stadion =

Sports venue in Wolfsburg, Germany

Coordinates: 52.4346°N 10.8070°E

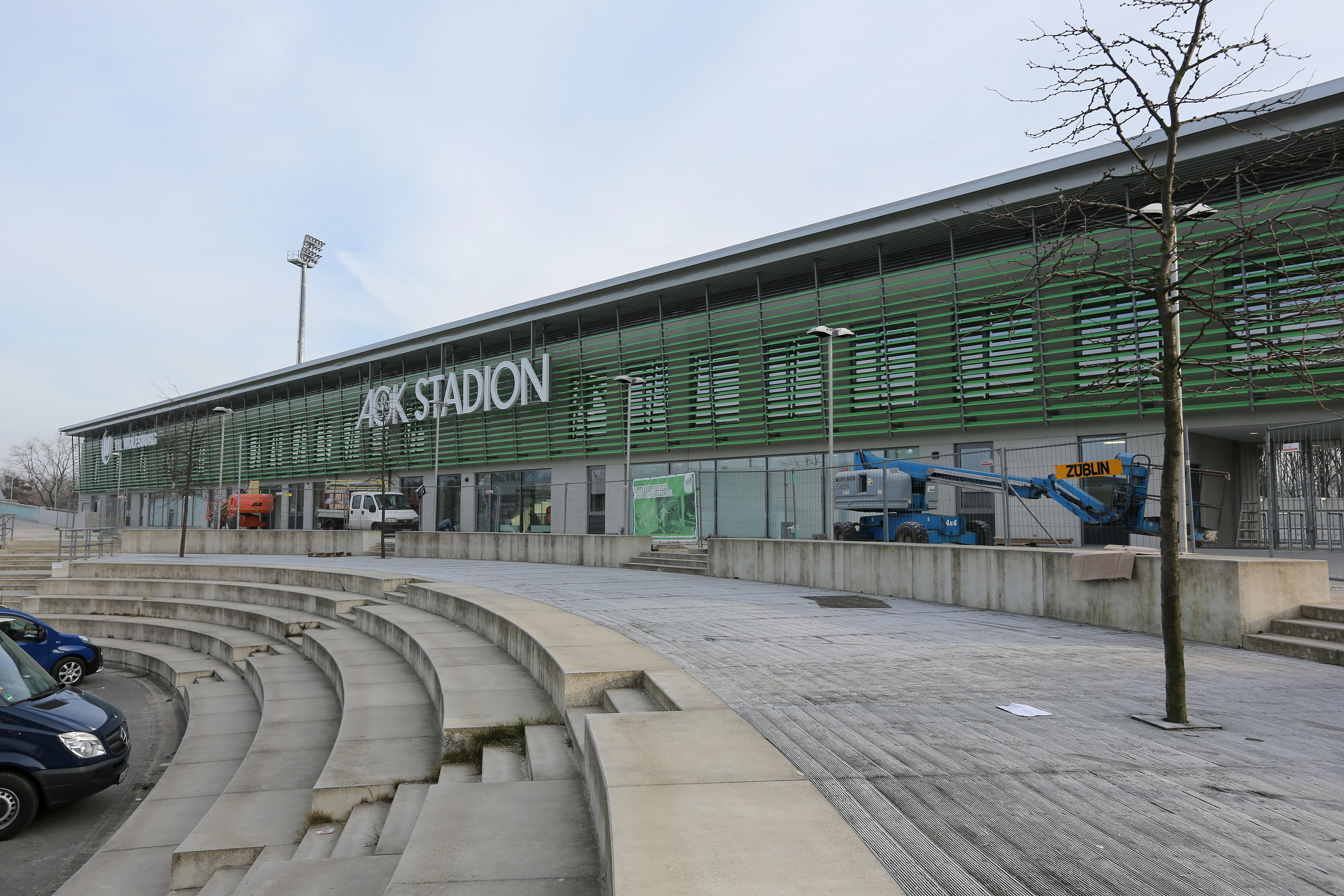
AOK Stadion

AOK Stadion is a multi-use stadium in Wolfsburg, Lower Saxony, Germany. It currently has a capacity of 5,000 spectators and serves as the main home of VfL Wolfsburg women's team.

== History ==
The stadium was opened in 2015 and replaced the VfL-Stadion am Elsterweg as the home ground of VfL Wolfsburg's women's and youth teams. The location chosen for the Stadium was the Allerpark where the Volkswagen Arena is also located.

During the UEFA Euro 2024 tournament, the Netherlands used the stadium as their team base camp.
