= Diána Németh =

Hungarian footballer (born 2004)

Personal information
- Full name: Diána Melinda Németh
- Date of birth: 31 August 2004 (age 22)
- Height: 1.73 m (5 ft 8 in)
- Position: Defender

Team information
- Current team: RB Leipzig
- Number: 25

Youth career
- 2015–2017: Pomázi Focisuli SE
- 2017–2021: Ferencváros

Senior career*
| Years | Team | Apps | (Gls) |
| 2021 | Soroksár SC | 5 | (3) |
| 2021–2024 | Ferencváros | 47 | (5) |
| 2024–2025 | VfL Wolfsburg | 5 | (0) |
| 2024 | VfL Wolfsburg II | 1 | (0) |
| 2025– | RB Leipzig | 0 | (0) |

International career^{‡}
| 2019 | Hungary U17 | 2 | (0) |
| 2022 | Hungary U19 | 3 | (1) |
| 2021– | Hungary | 28 | (0) |
- * Club domestic league appearances and goals as of 14 September 2025 ‡ National team caps and goals as of 3 June 2025

Diána Melinda Németh (born 31 August 2004) is a Hungarian professional footballer who plays as a defender for Frauen-Bundesliga club RB Leipzig and the Hungary national team.

== Club career ==
Németh started playing football from very young age, joining with Pomázi Focisuli SE in 2010 at the age of six. She became active in youth leagues in the 2015–16 season and stayed with Pomázi Focisuli SE until August 2017. Németh spent the rest of the youth career at Ferencváros where she was active from 2 August 2017 until 13 February 2021.

Németh started her senior career by briefly joining Soroksár SC mid 2020–21 season before returning to Ferencváros on 12 August 2021.

In the winter transfer window of the 2023–24 season, Németh transferred to VfL Wolfsburg who bought her out of the remaining six months of her Ferencváros contract.

== International career ==
Németh made her first international appearance for the national U17 team, playing in two UEFA U17 Championship qualification matches before the cancellation due to COVID-19 pandemic. Németh represented Hungary on senior level since 21 October 2021, when she played the first 66 minutes of a World Cup qualification match against Scotland. In parallel, Németh participated with the national U19 team in the 2022 U19 Championship qualification where she scored her first international goal in a match against Italy.

== Honours ==
Ferencváros

- Női Nemzeti Bajnokság I: 2021–22, 2022–23
