= Joelle Wedemeyer =

German footballer (born 1996)

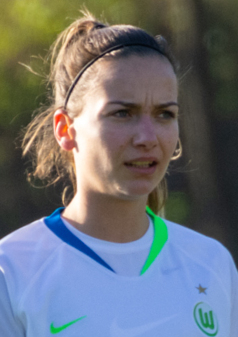
- Wedemeyer in 2018

Personal information
- Full name: Marie Joelle Wedemeyer
- Date of birth: 12 August 1996 (age 30)
- Place of birth: Braunschweig, Germany
- Height: 1.69 m (5 ft 7 in)
- Position: Centre-back

Team information
- Current team: VfL Wolfsburg
- Number: 24

Youth career
- –2011: MTV Wolfenbüttel
- 2011–2013: VfL Wolfsburg

Senior career*
Years	Team	Apps	(Gls)
2013–2022	VfL Wolfsburg II	49	(1)
2013–	VfL Wolfsburg	154	(7)

International career
2014–2015	Germany U19	11	(0)
2014–2016	Germany U20	8	(0)
2018	Germany	1	(0)
Medal record
Women's football
Representing Germany
FIFA U-20 Women's World Cup
Winner	2014 Canada
- * Club domestic league appearances and goals as of 14 November 2026

Marie Joelle Wedemeyer (born 12 August 1996) is a German footballer who plays as a centre-back for Frauen-Bundesliga club VfL Wolfsburg.

== Career ==
=== MTV Wolfenbüttel ===
Wedemeyer played for MTV Wolfenbüttel until 2011 and then transferred to VfL Wolfsburg youth department, whose junior team she played for in the Women’s Junior Bundesliga in its inaugural 2012/13 season. As a member of teams selected by the Lower Saxony Football Association, she took part in the national cup in 2011 (U15s), 2012 (U17s) and 2013 (U19s).

=== VfL Wolfsburg ===
Since the 2013/14 season, Wedemeyer has been a member of VfL Wolfsburg's first team squad, although she predominantly only features for the reserve team. Having made her first appearance for the first team in the second round of the German Cup against third division side TSG Burg Gretesch, she represented her country for the first time on 16 October 2013 in the second leg of the UEFA Women's Champions League Round of 32 tie against Pärnu JK.

=== International career ===
Wedemeyer made her debut for U-17 national side in a 7–0 victory over Ukraine in Brussels on 7 April 2014. With the Germany U20 team, she took part in the U20 World Cup in Canada from 5 to 24 August 2014, and came on as a substitute for Rebecca Knaak in the second half of the final against the Nigeria. Thanks to Lena Petermann's winning goal (1–0) in the 98th minute, Wedemeyer and her team became World Champions. She made her first appearance for the full national team on 10 June 2018, in a 3–2 win against the Canada in Hamilton (Ontario, Canada).

== Honours ==
VfL Wolfsburg

- German Champion (6): 2014, 2017, 2018, 2019, 2020, 2022
- German Cup (9): 2015, 2016, 2017, 2018, 2019, 2020, 2021, 2022, 2023
- Champions League (1): 2014

Germany U20

- U20 World Cup: 2014
