= Camilla Küver =

German association football player

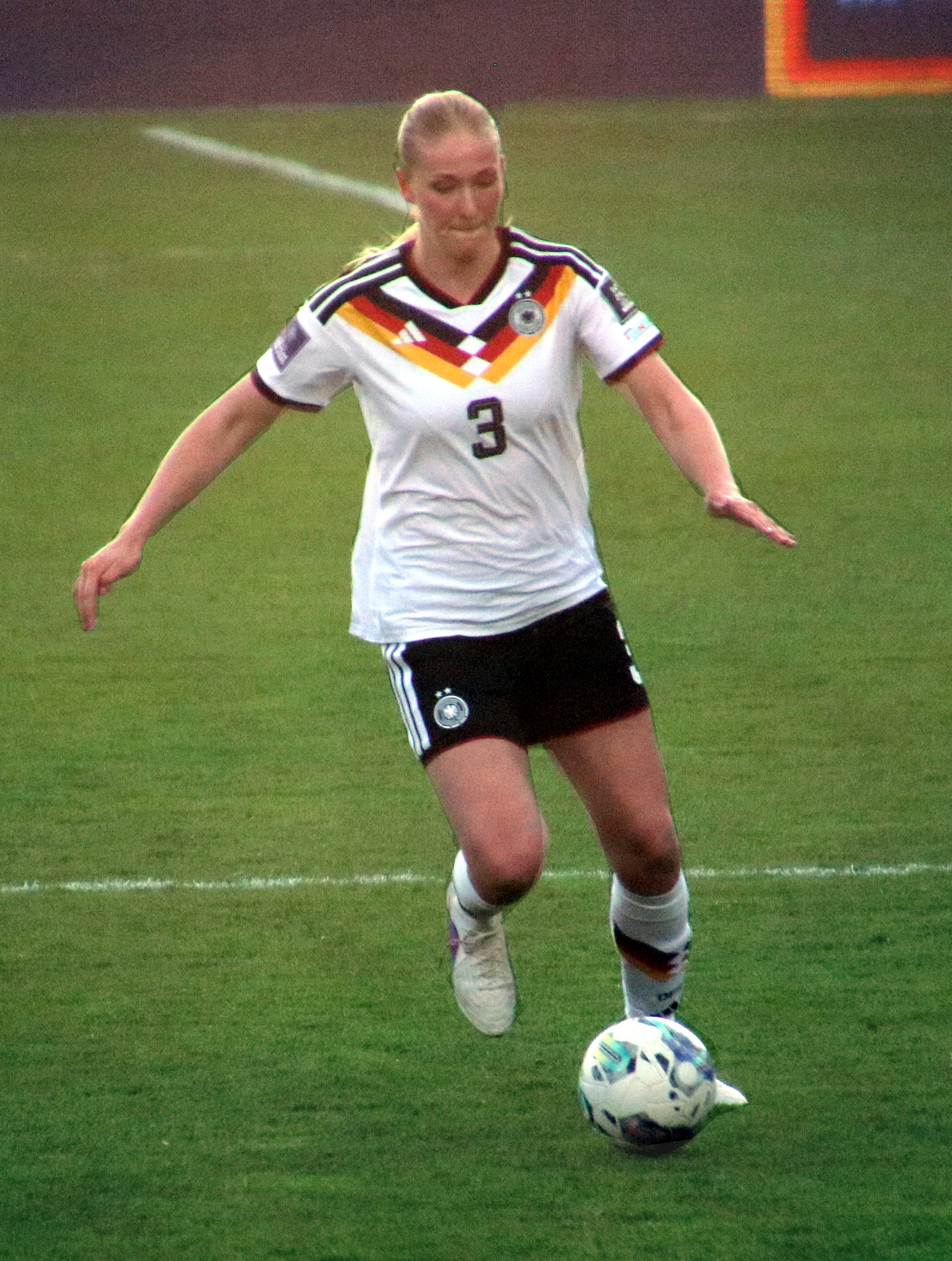
- Küver in 2026

Personal information
- Date of birth: 10 June 2003 (age 23)
- Place of birth: Bad Soden, Germany
- Height: 1.83 m (6 ft 0 in)
- Position: Defender

Team information
- Current team: VfL Wolfsburg
- Number: 16

Youth career
- 2017–2020: 1. FFC Frankfurt U17

Senior career*
Years	Team	Apps	(Gls)
2020	1. FFC Frankfurt II	2	(0)
2020–2023	Eintracht Frankfurt	36	(3)
2022–2023	Eintracht Frankfurt II	3	(1)
2023–	VfL Wolfsburg II	7	(1)
2023–	VfL Wolfsburg	31	(7)

International career^{‡}
2025–	Germany	7	(1)
- * Club domestic league appearances and goals as of 22 November 2026 ‡ National team caps and goals as of 21:05, 13 October 2026 (UTC)

Camilla Küver (born 10 June 2003) is a German footballer who plays as a full back for VfL Wolfsburg.

== Career statistics ==
=== International ===
As of 13 October 2026

Appearances and goals by national team and year
National team	Year	Apps	Goals
Germany
Germany	2025	2	0
Germany	2026	5	1
Total		7	1

Scores and results list Germany's goal tally first, score column indicates score after each Küver goal.

List of international goals scored by Camilla Küver
No.	Date	Venue	Opponent	Score	Result	Competition
1	9 October 2026	Wildparkstadion, Karlsruhe, Germany	Australia	3–1	4–2	Friendly
