= Lena Lattwein =

German footballer

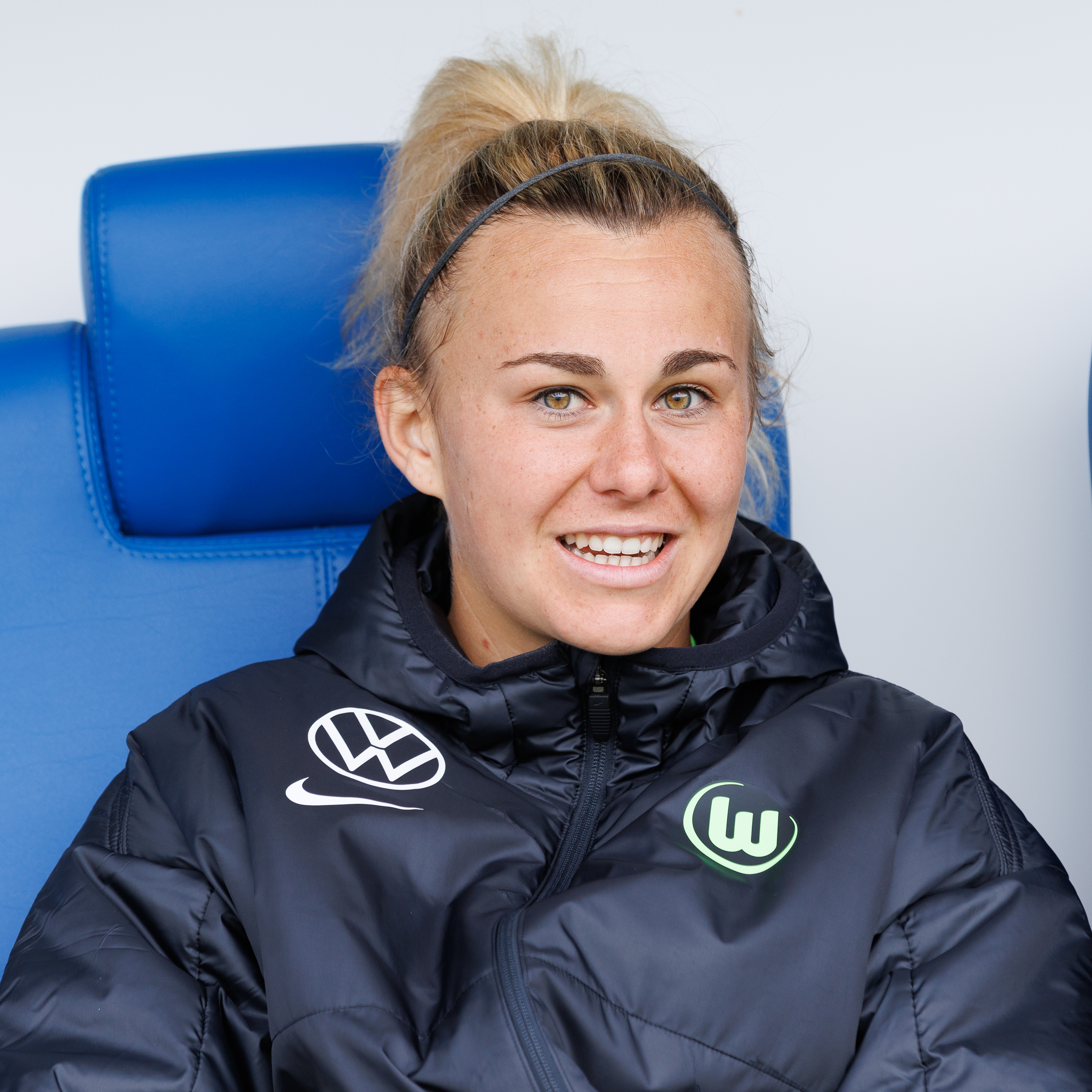
- Lattwein with VfL Wolfsburg in 2024

Personal information
- Full name: Lena Lattwein
- Date of birth: 2 May 2000 (age 26)
- Place of birth: Neunkirchen, Saarland, Germany
- Position: Midfielder

Team information
- Current team: VfL Wolfsburg
- Number: 8

Senior career*
Years	Team	Apps	(Gls)
2017	1. FC Saarbrücken	10	(6)
2017–2021	1899 Hoffenheim	68	(14)
2018	1899 Hoffenheim II	1	(0)
2021–	VfL Wolfsburg	84	(22)

International career^{‡}
2013–2015	Germany U15	6	(4)
2015–2016	Germany U16	5	(4)
2018–	Germany	37	(1)
Medal record
UEFA Women's Championship
Silver medal – second place	2022 England
- * Club domestic league appearances and goals as of 14 November 2026 ‡ National team caps and goals as of 5 December 2023

Lena Lattwein (born 2 May 2000) is a German professional footballer who plays as a midfielder for Frauen-Bundesliga club VfL Wolfsburg and the Germany national team.

== Club career ==
Lattwein played football for boys' youth teams of JFG Untere III. She then moved up to her first ever all-female team 1. FC Saarbrücken, making her debut in February 2017. On her second matchday, she scored a hat-trick against 1. FFC Frankfurt II in a 4-0 win. With Saarbrücken, she appeared in all 10 matches, scoring 6 goals.

In June 2017, she signed with Frauen-Bundesliga club TSG 1899 Hoffenheim. Lattwein made her Bundesliga debut on 2 September 2017, starting in Hoffenheim's first match of the season, a 0–6 defeat to VfL Wolfsburg. She scored her first Bundesliga goal on 15 October 2017 in a 3–0 win against 1. FC Köln. In September 2018, Lattwein extended her contract with Hoffenheim through 2020.

Lattwein signed to join VfL Wolfsburg in 2021. She made her debut already on the first day of the league championship, on August 28, in the 3-0 home victory against 1. FFC Turbine Potsdam.

== International career ==
Lattwein represented Germany at the under-15 and under-16 levels. On 30 October 2013, she made her debut for the Germany under-15 team in a 6–0 win against Scotland, scoring two goals. In February 2016, she captained the Germany under-16 team in the UEFA Development Tournament against the Netherlands, Scotland, and France.

In October 2018, Lattwein received her first call up to the Germany senior team, following an injury to Lena Petermann, for Germany's friendly match against Austria; Lattwein did not appear in the match. On 10 November 2018, she made her debut in a 5–2 win against Italy.

For the Euro 2022 in England, she was called up to the squad by the national coach Martina Voss-Tecklenburg. The German team was defeated by England in the final and became Vice European Champion. Lattwein played in five games, scoring one goal.

== Personal life ==
Lattwein studied mathematical economics at the University of Mannheim.

== Career statistics ==
As of 5 December 2023

Appearances and goals by national team and year
National team	Year	Apps	Goals
Germany	2018	2	0
Germany	2019	3	0
Germany	2020	4	0
Germany	2021	7	0
Germany	2022	11	1
Germany	2023	9	0
Total		36	1

Scores and results list Germany's goal tally first, score column indicates score after each Lattwein goal.

List of international goals scored by Lena Lattwein
No.	Date	Venue	Opponent	Score	Result	Competition
1	8 July 2022	London, England	Denmark	3–0	4–0	UEFA Women's Euro 2022

== Honours ==
Germany

- UEFA Women's Championship runner-up: 2022

VfL Wolfsburg

- German Champion: 2022
- German Cup: 2022, 2023
