= Janina Minge =

German footballer (born 1999)

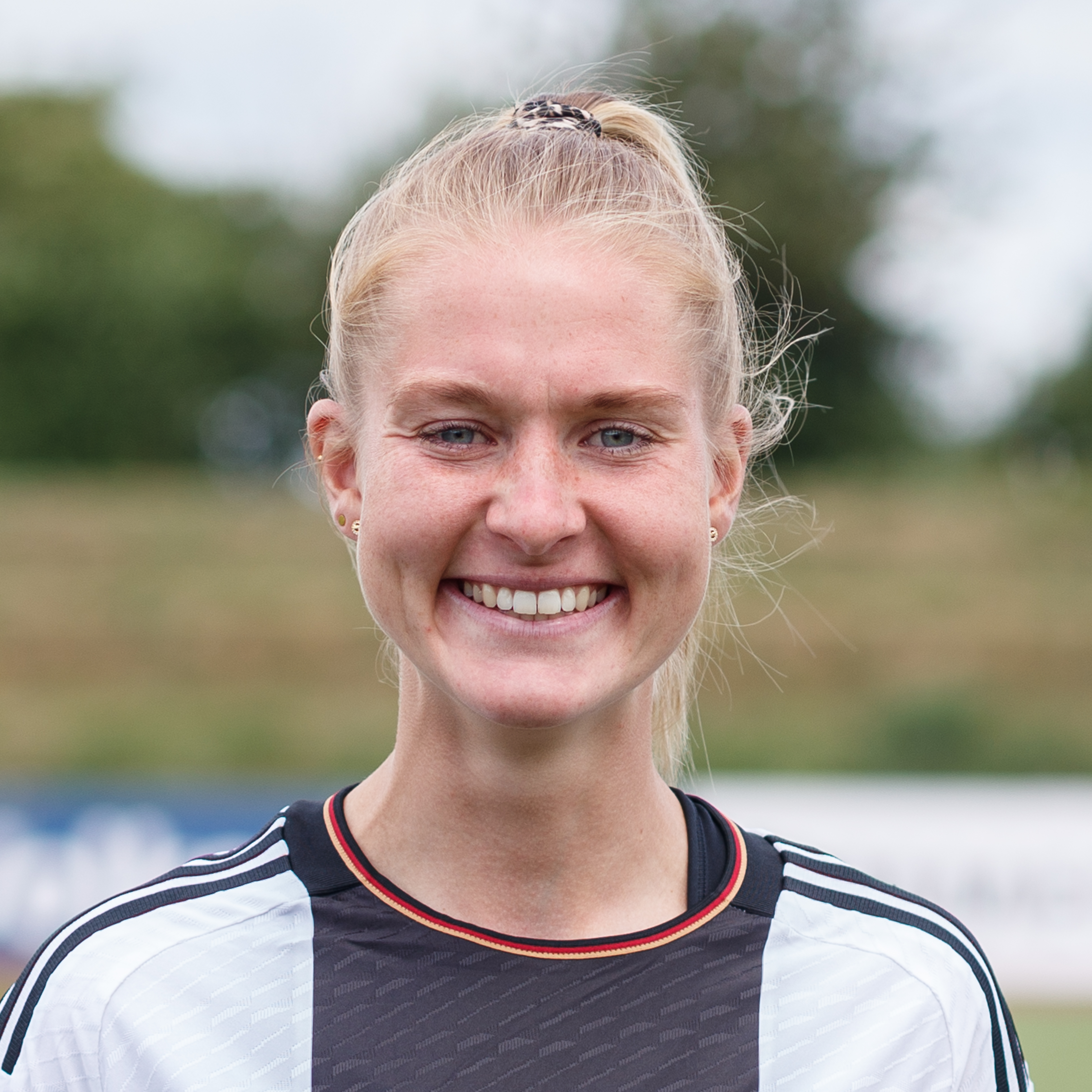
- Minge before the 2023 FIFA Women's World Cup

Personal information
- Full name: Janina Madeleine Minge
- Date of birth: 11 June 1999 (age 27)
- Place of birth: Lindau, Germany
- Height: 1.70 m (5 ft 7 in)
- Positions: Midfielder; centre-back

Team information
- Current team: VfL Wolfsburg
- Number: 6

Youth career
- TSG Lindau Zech
- VfB Friedrichshafen
- 2013–2015: FC Wangen 05

Senior career*
Years	Team	Apps	(Gls)
2015–2024	SC Freiburg	164	(22)
2024–	VfL Wolfsburg	57	(13)

International career^{‡}
2013–2014	Germany U15	6	(6)
2014	Germany U16	3	(3)
2015–2016	Germany U17	26	(10)
2017	Germany U19	11	(2)
2017–2018	Germany U20	9	(2)
2023–	Germany	35	(1)
Medal record
Olympic Games
Bronze medal – third place	2024 Paris	Team
- * Club domestic league appearances and goals as of 22 November 2026 ‡ National team caps and goals as of 21:15, 13 October 2026 (UTC)

Janina Madeleine Minge (born 11 June 1999) is a German professional footballer who plays as a midfielder or centre-back for Frauen-Bundesliga club VfL Wolfsburg and the Germany national team. She has previously played for SC Freiburg.

== Club career ==
Minge started playing football in 2002 as a three-year-old at TSG Lindau Zech. After seven years she moved to VfB Friedrichshafen. After another four years, she moved to FC Wangen 05, where she played in the male B youth team.

Minge joined Bundesliga team SC Freiburg for the 2015–16 season at 16 years old. On 13 September she was part of the squad for the first time. On 6 December in the 6–1 home win against Bayer Leverkusen, she debuted as a substitute for Sandra Starke. She scored her first goal on 20 November 2016 in her team's 2–1 win against FF USV Jena, making it 1-0. In the 2021–22 season, Minge appeared for SC Freiburg a total of 22 times. She didn't miss a single minute of the 1,980 possible minutes of play. With nine goals, she was the best German goalscorer during the winter break of the 2022–23 season and scored a remarkable goal in the 4–1 win against MSV Duisburg. This goal was voted SC Freiburg's Goal of the Year and was voted Goal of the Month for December by the Sportschau.

Minge moved to VfL Wolfsburg for the 2024–25 season, where she signed a contract that runs until 2027. She experienced a strong season, having played at defensive midfielde and centre back, which included four goals, two assists, and a passing percentage of 92% in 21 league games. The team finished second.

== International career ==
Minge made her debut for the U-15 national team in April 2013, in an 8–0 win over the Netherlands. She made three appearances for the under-16 national team in 2014. In 2015, she was the second youngest player in the U-17 national team squad for the European Championship in Iceland where the team reached the semi-finals but were defeated 1–0 by the Swiss selection. In May 2016, the team won the 2016 UEFA Under-17 Championship after a penalty shootout against Spain in Belarus. The four Freiburg players in the squad contributed seven of Germany's ten goals at the tournament and two of them, including Minge, successfully converted their kicks in the shootout.

On 17 July 2024, Lena Oberdorf withdrew from the 2024 Summer Olympics squad due to injury. Minge was called up in her place, whilst Pia-Sophie Wolter was added to the alternate list.

On 12 June 2025, Minge was called up to the Germany squad for the UEFA Women's Euro 2025.

== Personal life ==
Minge joined the police force of the state of Baden-Württemberg in 2019. She was accepted into the BW police's elite sports program and successfully completed her training as a police officer in September 2022. She was then transferred to a police station and is currently working on patrol duty.

== Career statistics ==
As of 13 October 2026

Appearances and goals by national team and year
National team	Year	Apps	Goals
Germany	2023	2	1
Germany	2024	13	0
Germany	2025	14	0
Germany	2026	6	0
Total		35	1

No.	Date	Venue	Opponent	Score	Result	Competition
1.	25 June 2023	Offenbach, Germany	Vietnam	2–0	2–1	Friendly

== Honours ==
Germany U17

- UEFA Women's Under-17 Championship: 2016

Germany

- Summer Olympics bronze medal: 2024

Individual

- Silbernes Lorbeerblatt: 2024
