= 2025–26 in German football =

Football in Germany
- Season: 2025–26

Men's football
- Bundesliga: Bayern Munich
- 2. Bundesliga: Schalke 04
- 3. Liga: VfL Osnabrück
- DFB-Pokal: Bayern Munich
- Franz Beckenbauer Supercup: Bayern Munich

Women's football
- Frauen-Bundesliga: Bayern Munich
- 2. Frauen-Bundesliga: VfB Stuttgart
- DFB-Pokal: Bayern Munich
- DFB-Supercup: Bayern Munich

The 2025–26 season was the 116th season of competitive football in Germany.

== Promotion and relegation ==
=== Pre-season ===
League	Promoted to league	Relegated from league
Bundesliga	1. FC Köln; Hamburger SV	Holstein Kiel; VfL Bochum
2. Bundesliga	Dynamo Dresden; Arminia Bielefeld	SSV Ulm; Jahn Regensburg
3. Liga	MSV Duisburg; TSV Havelse; TSG Hoffenheim II; 1. FC Schweinfurt	Borussia Dortmund II; Hannover 96 II; SV Sandhausen; SpVgg Unterhaching
Frauen-Bundesliga^{1}	1. FC Nürnberg; Union Berlin; Hamburger SV	Turbine Potsdam
2. Frauen-Bundesliga	Viktoria Berlin; Mainz 05; VfB Stuttgart; VfR Warbeyen; VfL Wolfsburg II	SV 67 Weinberg; SC Freiburg II; FSV Gütersloh

The Frauen-Bundesliga was expanded to 14 teams for the 2025–26 season.

=== Post-season ===
League	Promoted to league	Relegated from league
Bundesliga	Schalke 04; SV Elversberg; SC Paderborn	VfL Wolfsburg; 1. FC Heidenheim; FC St. Pauli
2. Bundesliga	VfL Osnabrück; Energie Cottbus	Fortuna Düsseldorf; Preußen Münster
3. Liga	Sonnenhof Großaspach; SV Meppen; Fortuna Köln; Würzburger Kickers	1860 Munich^{1}; Erzgebirge Aue; SSV Ulm; 1. FC Schweinfurt
Frauen-Bundesliga	VfB Stuttgart; Mainz 05	Carl Zeiss Jena; SGS Essen
2. Frauen-Bundesliga	TSG Hoffenheim II; 1. FC Köln II; Hertha BSC	VfL Wolfsburg II; VfR Warbeyen; Bayern Munich II

1860 Munich were administratively relegated to the Regionalliga Bayern after failing to obtain a 3. Liga license, sparing TSV Havelse from relegation.

== National teams ==
Win Draw Loss

=== Germany national football team ===
==== Kits ====
Home	Away

==== 2026 FIFA World Cup qualification ====
===== Group A =====
Pos	Team	Pld	W	D	L	GF	GA	GD	Pts	Qualification	(Germany national football team)	(Slovakia national football team)	(Northern Ireland national football team)	(Luxembourg national football team)
1	Germany	6	5	0	1	16	3	+13	15	Qualification for 2026 FIFA World Cup	—	6–0	3–1	4–0
2	Slovakia	6	4	0	2	6	8	−2	12	Advance to play-offs	2–0	—	1–0	2–0
3	Northern Ireland	6	3	0	3	7	6	+1	9	Advance to play-offs via Nations League	0–1	2–0	—	1–0
4	Luxembourg	6	0	0	6	1	13	−12	0		0–2	0–1	1–3	—

Source: FIFA, UEFA
Rules for classification: Tiebreakers

4 September 2025 Group A	Slovakia	2–0	Germany	Bratislava
20:45 (20:45 UTC+2)	Hancko 42'; Strelec 55'	Report		Stadium: Tehelné pole Attendance: 20,013; Referee: Serdar Gözübüyük (Netherlands)

7 September 2025 Group A	Germany	3–1	Northern Ireland	Cologne
20:45 (20:45 UTC+2)	Gnabry 7'; Amiri 69'; Wirtz 72'	Report	Price 34'	Stadium: RheinEnergieStadion; Attendance: 43,169; Referee: Espen Eskås (Norway)

10 October 2025 Group A	Germany	4–0	Luxembourg	Sinsheim
20:45 (20:45 UTC+2)	Raum 12'; Kimmich 21' (pen.), 50'; Gnabry 48'	Report		Stadium: Rhein-Neckar-Arena; Attendance: 25,249; Referee: Nenad Minaković (Serbia)

13 October 2025 Group A	Northern Ireland	0–1	Germany	Belfast
20:45 (19:45 UTC+1)		Report	Woltemade 31'	Stadium: Windsor Park; Attendance: 17,926; Referee: Jesús Gil Manzano (Spain)

14 November 2025 Group A	Luxembourg	0–2	Germany	Luxembourg City
20:45 (20:45 UTC+1)		Report	Woltemade 49', 69'	Stadium: Stade de Luxembourg; Attendance: 9,214; Referee: John Brooks (England)

17 November 2025 Group A	Germany	6–0	Slovakia	Leipzig
20:45 (20:45 UTC+2)	Woltemade 18'; Gnabry 29'; Sané 36', 41'; Baku 67'; Ouédraogo 79'	Report		Stadium: Red Bull Arena; Attendance: 40,120; Referee: François Letexier (France)

==== 2026 FIFA World Cup ====
===== 2026 FIFA World Cup Group E =====
Pos	Team	Pld	W	D	L	GF	GA	GD	Pts	Qualification
1	Germany	3	2	0	1	10	4	+6	6 (Note: Head-to-head result: Germany 2–1 Ivory Coast.)	Advance to knockout stage
2	Ivory Coast	3	2	0	1	4	2	+2	6	Advance to knockout stage
3	Ecuador	3	1	1	1	2	2	0	4	Advance to knockout stage
4	Curaçao	3	0	1	2	1	9	−8	1	

Source: FIFA
Rules for classification: Group stage tiebreakers

===== 2026 FIFA World Cup fixtures and results =====
14 June 2026 Group E	Germany	7–1	Curaçao	Houston, United States
19:00 (12:00 UTC−5)	Nmecha 6'; Schlotterbeck 38'; Havertz 45+5' (pen.), 88'; Musiala 47'; Brown 68'; Undav 78'	Report	Comenencia 21'	Stadium: NRG Stadium; Attendance: 68,021; Referee: Jalal Jayed (Morocco)

20 June 2026 Group E	Germany	2–1	Ivory Coast	Toronto, Canada
22:00 (16:00 UTC−4)	Undav 68', 90+4'	Report	Kessie 30'	Stadium: BMO Field; Referee: Juan Gabriel Benítez (Paraguay)

25 June 2026 Group E	Ecuador	2–1	Germany	East Rutherford, United States
22:00 (16:00 UTC−4)	Angulo 9'; Plata 77'	Report	Sané 2'	Stadium: MetLife Stadium; Attendance: 80,663; Referee: Tori Penso (United States)

29 June 2026 R32	Germany	1–1 (a.e.t.) (3–4 p)	Paraguay	Foxborough, United States
16:30 ET EST (UTC−04:00)	Havertz 54'	Report	Enciso 42'	Stadium: Gillette Stadium; Attendance: 63,945; Referee: Jalal Jayed (Morocco)
	Penalties
	Havertz (penalty missed); Kimmich (penalty scored); Musiala (penalty scored); Woltemade (penalty missed); Amiri (penalty scored); Tah (penalty missed)		(penalty scored) Maurício; (penalty scored) G. Gómez; (penalty scored) Galarza; (penalty missed) Sanabria; (penalty missed) Balbuena; (penalty scored) Canale

==== Friendly matches ====
27 March 2026 Friendly	Switzerland	3–4	Germany	Basel
20:45 (20:45 UTC+1)	Ndoye 17'; Embolo 41'; Monteiro 79'	Report	Tah 26'; Gnabry 45+1'; Wirtz 61', 85'	Stadium: St. Jakob-Park; Attendance: 34,316; Referee: Chris Kavanagh (England)

30 March 2026 Friendly	Germany	2–1	Ghana	Stuttgart
20:45 (20:45 UTC+2)	Havertz 45+3' (pen.); Undav 88'	Report	Fatawu 70'	Stadium: MHPArena; Attendance: 52,723; Referee: Stuart Attwell (England)

31 May 2026 Friendly	Germany	4–0	Finland	Mainz
20:45 (20:45 UTC+2)	Undav 34', 57'; Wirtz 48'; Musiala 63'	Report		Stadium: Mewa Arena; Attendance: 25,122; Referee: Matheus Candançan (Brazil)

6 June 2026 Friendly	United States	1–2	Germany	Chicago
20:30 (13:30 UTC−5)	Robinson 37'	Report	Havertz 2'; Sané 57'	Stadium: Soldier Field; Attendance: 63,636; Referee: Piero Maza (Chile)

=== Germany women's national football team ===
==== Kits ====
Home	Away

==== UEFA Women's Euro 2025 ====
===== UEFA Women's Euro 2025 Group C =====
Pos	Team	Pld	W	D	L	GF	GA	GD	Pts	Qualification
1	Sweden	3	3	0	0	8	1	+7	9	Advance to knockout stage
2	Germany	3	2	0	1	5	5	0	6	Advance to knockout stage
3	Poland	3	1	0	2	3	7	−4	3	
4	Denmark	3	0	0	3	3	6	−3	0	

Source: UEFA
Rules for classification: Group stage tiebreakers

===== UEFA Women's Euro 2025 fixtures and results =====
4 July 2025 Group C	Germany	2–0	Poland	St. Gallen, Switzerland
21:00 (21:00 UTC+2)	Brand 52'; Schüller 66'	Report		Stadium: Kybunpark; Attendance: 15,972; Referee: Stéphanie Frappart (France)

8 July 2025 Group C	Germany	2–1	Denmark	Basel, Switzerland
18:00 (18:00 UTC+2)	Nüsken 56' (pen.); Schüller 66'	Report	Vangsgaard 26'	Stadium: St. Jakob-Park; Attendance: 34,165; Referee: Catarina Campos (Portugal)

12 July 2025 Group C	Sweden	4–1	Germany	Zurich, Switzerland
21:00 (21:00 UTC+2)	Blackstenius 12'; Holmberg 25'; Rolfö 34' (pen.); Hurtig 80'	Report	Brand 7'	Stadium: Letzigrund; Attendance: 22,552; Referee: Silvia Gasperotti (Italy)

19 July 2025 Quarter-finals	France	1–1 (a.e.t.) (5–6 p)	Germany	Basel, Switzerland
21:00 (21:00 UTC+2)	Geyoro 15' (pen.)	Report	Nüsken 25'	Stadium: St. Jakob-Park; Attendance: 34,128; Referee: Tess Olofsson (Sweden)
	Penalties
	Majri (penalty missed); Karchaoui (penalty scored); Malard (penalty scored); Baltimore (penalty scored); Jean-François (penalty scored); N'Dongala (penalty scored); Sombath (penalty missed)		(penalty scored) Minge; (penalty scored) Dallmann; (penalty scored) Knaak; (penalty missed) Däbritz; (penalty scored) Berger; (penalty scored) Bühl; (penalty scored) Nüsken

23 July 2025 Semi-finals	Germany	0–1 (a.e.t.)	Spain	Zurich, Switzerland
21:00 (21:00 UTC+2)		Report	Bonmatí 113'	Stadium: Letzigrund; Attendance: 22,432; Referee: Edina Alves Batista (Brazil)

==== 2025 UEFA Women's Nations League Finals ====
24 October 2025 Semi-finals	Germany	1–0	France	Düsseldorf
17:45 (17:45 UTC+2)	Bühl 79'	Report		Stadium: Merkur Spiel-Arena; Attendance: 37,191; Referee: Ivana Projkovska (North Macedonia)

28 October 2025 Semi-finals	France	2–2 (2–3 agg.)	Germany	Caen
21:10 (21:10 UTC+2)	Malard 3'; Mateo 89'	Report	Anyomi 12'; Bühl 50'	Stadium: Stade Michel d'Ornano; Attendance: 18,112; Referee: Frida Klarlund (Denmark)

28 November 2025 Final	Germany	0–0	Spain	Kaiserslautern
20:30 (20:30 UTC+1)		Report		Stadium: Fritz-Walter-Stadion; Attendance: 40,159; Referee: Iuliana Demetrescu (Romania)

2 December 2025 Final	Spain	3–0 (3–0 agg.)	Germany	Madrid
18:30 (18:30 UTC+1)	Pina 61', 74'; López 68'	Report		Stadium: Metropolitano Stadium; Attendance: 55,843; Referee: Silvia Gasperotti (Italy)

==== 2027 FIFA Women's World Cup qualification ====
===== 2027 FIFA Women's World Cup qualification – UEFA League A Group A4 =====
Pos	Team	Pld	W	D	L	GF	GA	GD	Pts	Qualification or relegation
1	Germany	6	5	1	0	18	1	+17	16	Qualification to 2027 FIFA Women's World Cup
2	Norway	6	4	0	2	11	9	+2	12	Advance to play-offs
3	Austria	6	1	1	4	3	9	−6	4	Advance to play-offs
4	Slovenia (R)	6	1	0	5	3	16	−13	3	Advance to play-offs and relegation to League B

Source: UEFA
Rules for classification: Tiebreakers
(R) Relegated

===== 2027 FIFA Women's World Cup qualification fixtures and results =====
3 March 2026 Group A	Germany	5–0	Slovenia	Dresden
17:45 (17:45 UTC+1)	Endemann 6'; Senß 12'; Dallmann 48'; Mühlhaus 53'; Schüller 71'	Report		Stadium: Rudolf-Harbig-Stadion; Attendance: 19,169; Referee: Eleni Antoniou (Greece)

7 March 2026 Group A	Norway	0–4	Germany	Stavanger
18:00 (18:00 UTC+1)		Report	Senß 18'; Wamser 45+1'; Endemann 45+4'; Brand 58'	Stadium: Lyse Arena; Attendance: 8,532; Referee: Stéphanie Frappart (France)

14 April 2026 Group A	Germany	5–1	Austria	Nuremberg
18:15 (18:15 UTC+2)	Anyomi 17'; Endemann 52'; Puntigam 68' (o.g.); Brand 76'; Schüller 83'	Report	D'Angelo 77'	Stadium: Max-Morlock-Stadion; Attendance: 24,237; Referee: Volha Blotskaya (Belarus)

18 April 2026 Group A	Austria	0–0	Germany	Ried
18:00 (18:00 UTC+2)		Report		Stadium: BWT X Upper Austrian Arena; Attendance: 4,300; Referee: Iuliana Demetrescu (Romania)

5 June 2026 Group A	Germany	2–0	Norway	Cologne
20:35 (20:45 UTC+2)	Müller 18'; Wamser 27'	Report		Stadium: RheinEnergieStadion; Attendance: 33,425; Referee: Marta Huerta De Aza (Spain)

9 June 2026 Group A	Slovenia	0–2	Germany	Ljubljana
18:00 (18:00 UTC+2)		Report	Prašnikar 39' (o.g.); Martinez 50'	Stadium: Stožice Stadium; Attendance: 3,000; Referee: Michalina Diakow (Poland)

== League season ==
=== Men ===
==== Bundesliga ====
===== Bundesliga standings =====
Pos	Team	Pld	W	D	L	GF	GA	GD	Pts	Qualification or relegation
1	Bayern Munich (C)	34	28	5	1	122	36	+86	89	Qualification for the Champions League league phase
2	Borussia Dortmund	34	22	7	5	70	34	+36	73	Qualification for the Champions League league phase
3	RB Leipzig	34	20	5	9	66	47	+19	65	Qualification for the Champions League league phase
4	VfB Stuttgart	34	18	8	8	71	49	+22	62	Qualification for the Champions League league phase
5	TSG Hoffenheim	34	18	7	9	65	52	+13	61	Qualification for the Europa League league phase (Note: The 2025–26 DFB-Pokal winners qualified for the Europa League league phase. Since the DFB-Pokal winners, Bayern Munich, qualified for the Champions League, the Europa League spot passed to the sixth-placed team, and the Conference League spot passed to the seventh-placed team.)
6	Bayer Leverkusen	34	17	8	9	68	47	+21	59	Qualification for the Europa League league phase
7	SC Freiburg	34	13	8	13	51	57	−6	47	Qualification for the Conference League play-off round
8	Eintracht Frankfurt	34	11	11	12	61	65	−4	44	
9	FC Augsburg	34	12	7	15	45	61	−16	43	
10	Mainz 05	34	10	10	14	44	53	−9	40	
11	Union Berlin	34	10	9	15	44	58	−14	39	
12	Borussia Mönchengladbach	34	9	11	14	42	53	−11	38	
13	Hamburger SV	34	9	11	14	40	54	−14	38	
14	1. FC Köln	34	7	11	16	49	63	−14	32	
15	Werder Bremen	34	8	8	18	37	60	−23	32	
16	VfL Wolfsburg (R)	34	7	8	19	45	69	−24	29	Qualification for the relegation play-offs
17	1. FC Heidenheim (R)	34	6	8	20	41	72	−31	26	Relegation to 2. Bundesliga
18	FC St. Pauli (R)	34	6	8	20	29	60	−31	26	Relegation to 2. Bundesliga

Source: Bundesliga
Rules for classification: 1) Points; 2) Goal difference; 3) Goals scored; 4) Head-to-head results; 5) Head-to-head away goals scored; 6) Away goals scored; 7) Play-off.
(Rules 4–6 only apply after home and away matches have been played between the tied teams.)
(C) Champions; (R) Relegated

==== 2. Bundesliga ====
===== 2. Bundesliga standings =====
Pos	Team	Pld	W	D	L	GF	GA	GD	Pts	Promotion, qualification or relegation
1	Schalke 04 (C, P)	34	21	7	6	50	31	+19	70	Promotion to Bundesliga
2	SV Elversberg (P)	34	18	8	8	64	39	+25	62	Promotion to Bundesliga
3	SC Paderborn (O, P)	34	18	8	8	59	45	+14	62	Qualification for promotion play-offs
4	Hannover 96	34	16	12	6	60	44	+16	60	
5	Darmstadt 98	34	13	13	8	57	45	+12	52	
6	1. FC Kaiserslautern	34	16	4	14	52	47	+5	52	
7	Hertha BSC	34	14	9	11	47	44	+3	51	
8	1. FC Nürnberg	34	12	10	12	47	45	+2	46	
9	VfL Bochum	34	11	11	12	49	47	+2	44	
10	Karlsruher SC	34	12	8	14	53	64	−11	44	
11	Dynamo Dresden	34	11	8	15	54	53	+1	41	
12	Holstein Kiel	34	11	8	15	44	48	−4	41	
13	Arminia Bielefeld	34	10	9	15	53	51	+2	39	
14	1. FC Magdeburg	34	12	3	19	52	58	−6	39	
15	Eintracht Braunschweig	34	10	7	17	36	54	−18	37	
16	Greuther Fürth (O)	34	10	7	17	49	68	−19	37	Qualification for relegation play-offs
17	Fortuna Düsseldorf (R)	34	11	4	19	33	53	−20	37	Relegation to 3. Liga
18	Preußen Münster (R)	34	6	12	16	38	61	−23	30	Relegation to 3. Liga

Source: Bundesliga
Rules for classification: 1) Points; 2) Goal difference; 3) Goals scored; 4) Head-to-head results; 5) Head-to-head away goals scored; 6) Away goals scored; 7) Play-off.
(Rules 4–6 only apply after home and away matches have been played between the tied teams.)
(C) Champions; (O) Play-off winners; (P) Promoted; (R) Relegated

==== 3. Liga ====
===== 3. Liga standings =====
Pos	Team	Pld	W	D	L	GF	GA	GD	Pts	Promotion, qualification or relegation
1	VfL Osnabrück (C, P)	38	24	8	6	66	34	+32	80	Promotion to 2. Bundesliga and qualification for DFB-Pokal
2	Energie Cottbus (P)	38	21	9	8	72	51	+21	72	Promotion to 2. Bundesliga and qualification for DFB-Pokal
3	Rot-Weiss Essen	38	20	10	8	78	66	+12	70	Qualification for promotion play-offs and DFB-Pokal
4	MSV Duisburg	38	19	11	8	66	49	+17	68	Qualification for DFB-Pokal
5	Hansa Rostock	38	18	13	7	74	49	+25	67	
6	SC Verl	38	18	10	10	82	48	+34	64	
7	Alemannia Aachen	38	19	7	12	76	57	+19	64	
8	1860 Munich (Note: 1860 Munich originally finished the season in eighth place, but were administratively relegated to the Regionalliga Bayern after failing to obtain a license for the upcoming 3. Liga season, sparing TSV Havelse from relegation.) (R)	38	15	11	12	54	53	+1	56	Relegation to Regionalliga
9	Wehen Wiesbaden	38	15	8	15	54	52	+2	53	
10	Waldhof Mannheim	38	15	7	16	59	72	−13	52	
11	Viktoria Köln	38	15	6	17	51	53	−2	51	
12	FC Ingolstadt	38	13	10	15	65	56	+9	49	
13	Jahn Regensburg	38	14	7	17	54	58	−4	49	
14	VfB Stuttgart II (Note: Reserve teams are ineligible for promotion or DFB-Pokal qualification.)	38	13	7	18	57	69	−12	46	
15	1. FC Saarbrücken	38	10	14	14	51	57	−6	44	
16	TSG Hoffenheim II	38	12	7	19	65	71	−6	43	
17	TSV Havelse	38	9	8	21	57	89	−32	35	Spared from relegation
18	Erzgebirge Aue (R)	38	7	13	18	51	70	−19	34	Relegation to Regionalliga
19	SSV Ulm (R)	38	9	6	23	49	78	−29	33	Relegation to Regionalliga
20	1. FC Schweinfurt (R)	38	5	6	27	38	87	−49	21	Relegation to Regionalliga

Source: DFB
Rules for classification: 1) Points; 2) Goal difference; 3) Goals scored; 4) Head-to-head results; 5) Head-to-head away goals scored; 6) Away goals scored; 7) Play-off.
(C) Champions; (P) Promoted; (R) Relegated

=== Women ===
==== Frauen-Bundesliga ====
===== Frauen-Bundesliga standings =====
Pos	Team	Pld	W	D	L	GF	GA	GD	Pts	Qualification or relegation
1	Bayern Munich (C)	26	24	2	0	90	9	+81	74	Qualification for Champions League league phase
2	VfL Wolfsburg	26	18	4	4	72	38	+34	58	Qualification for Champions League third qualifying round
3	Eintracht Frankfurt	26	16	3	7	65	43	+22	51	Qualification for Champions League second qualifying round
4	TSG Hoffenheim	26	14	4	8	48	30	+18	46	
5	Bayer Leverkusen	26	15	1	10	46	36	+10	46	
6	Werder Bremen	26	12	7	7	42	36	+6	43	
7	1. FC Köln	26	11	4	11	36	37	−1	37	
8	SC Freiburg	26	10	4	12	44	46	−2	34	
9	Union Berlin	26	8	6	12	42	51	−9	30	
10	RB Leipzig	26	7	7	12	39	48	−9	28	
11	1. FC Nürnberg	26	6	4	16	33	61	−28	22	
12	Hamburger SV	26	4	6	16	26	57	−31	18	
13	SGS Essen (R)	26	3	7	16	22	63	−41	16	Relegation to 2. Bundesliga
14	Carl Zeiss Jena (R)	26	2	5	19	22	72	−50	11	Relegation to 2. Bundesliga

Source: DFB
Rules for classification: 1) Points; 2) Goal difference; 3) Goals scored; 4) Head-to-head results; 5) Head-to-head away goals scored; 6) Away goals scored; 7) Play-off.
(C) Champions; (R) Relegated

==== 2. Frauen-Bundesliga ====
===== 2. Frauen-Bundesliga standings =====
Pos	Team	Pld	W	D	L	GF	GA	GD	Pts	Qualification or relegation
1	VfB Stuttgart (C, P)	26	17	7	2	81	33	+48	58	Promotion to Bundesliga
2	Mainz 05 (P)	26	17	4	5	77	29	+48	55	Promotion to Bundesliga
3	SC Sand	26	16	5	5	53	26	+27	53	
4	SV Meppen	26	15	4	7	56	26	+30	49	
5	Viktoria Berlin	26	12	9	5	41	20	+21	45	
6	SG Andernach	26	10	8	8	46	44	+2	38	
7	FC Ingolstadt	26	12	2	12	45	48	−3	38	
8	Eintracht Frankfurt II (Note: Reserve teams cannot compete in the Frauen-Bundesliga and are therefore ineligible for promotion.)	26	9	6	11	38	38	0	33	
9	VfL Bochum	26	9	5	12	33	40	−7	32	
10	Borussia Mönchengladbach	26	9	4	13	39	53	−14	31	
11	Turbine Potsdam	26	9	3	14	37	50	−13	30	
12	Bayern Munich II (R)	26	8	3	15	40	64	−24	27	Relegation to Regionalliga
13	VfL Wolfsburg II (R)	26	6	1	19	38	75	−37	19	Relegation to Regionalliga
14	VfR Warbeyen (R)	26	1	3	22	21	99	−78	6	Relegation to Regionalliga

Source: DFB
Rules for classification: 1) Points; 2) Goal difference; 3) Goals scored; 4) Head-to-head results; 5) Head-to-head away goals scored; 6) Away goals scored; 7) Play-off.
(C) Champions; (P) Promoted; (R) Relegated

== Cup competitions ==
=== Men ===
==== DFB-Pokal ====
===== Final =====
23 May 2026
20:00 CEST

Bayern Munich	3–0	VfB Stuttgart
Kane 55', 80', 90+2' (pen.)	Report

Olympiastadion, Berlin
Attendance: 74,036
Referee: Sven Jablonski (Bremen)

==== Franz Beckenbauer Supercup ====
16 August 2025
20:30 CEST

VfB Stuttgart	1–2	Bayern Munich
Leweling 90+3'	Report (DFB); Report (DFL)	Kane 18'; Díaz 77'

MHPArena, Stuttgart
Attendance: 60,000
Referee: Harm Osmers (Hanover)

=== Women ===
==== DFB-Pokal Frauen ====
===== Final =====
14 May 2026
16:00

VfL Wolfsburg	0–4	Bayern Munich
	Report	Stanway 45+2' (pen.); Harder 59'; Tanikawa 77'; Caruso 84'

RheinEnergieStadion, Cologne
Attendance: 46,064
Referee: Franziska Wildfeuer

==== DFB-Supercup Frauen ====
30 August 2025
14:00 CEST (UTC+2)

Bayern Munich	4–2	VfL Wolfsburg
Eriksson 18'; Damnjanović 25'; Schüller 72'; Stanway 78' (pen.)	Report	Endemann 57'; Minge 88' (pen.)

Wildparkstadion, Karlsruhe
Attendance: 16,933
Referee: Riem Hussein

== German clubs in Europe ==
=== UEFA Champions League ===
==== League phase ====
===== Borussia Dortmund =====
Pos	Team	Pld	W	D	L	GF	GA	GD	Pts	Qualification
15	(Italian Football Federation) Atalanta	8	4	1	3	10	10	0	13	Advance to knockout phase play-offs (seeded)
16	(German Football Association) Bayer Leverkusen	8	3	3	2	13	14	−1	12	Advance to knockout phase play-offs (seeded)
17	(German Football Association) Borussia Dortmund	8	3	2	3	19	17	+2	11	Advance to knockout phase play-offs (unseeded)
18	(Hellenic Football Federation) Olympiacos	8	3	2	3	10	14	−4	11	Advance to knockout phase play-offs (unseeded)
19	(Royal Belgian Football Association) Club Brugge	8	3	1	4	15	17	−2	10	Advance to knockout phase play-offs (unseeded)

Source: UEFA
Rules for classification: League phase tiebreakers

Home team	Score	Away team
Juventus (Italy)	4–4	(Germany) Borussia Dortmund
Borussia Dortmund (Germany)	4–1	(Spain) Athletic Bilbao
Copenhagen (Denmark)	2–4	(Germany) Borussia Dortmund
Manchester City (England)	4–1	(Germany) Borussia Dortmund
Borussia Dortmund (Germany)	4–0	(Spain) Villarreal
Borussia Dortmund (Germany)	2–2	(Norway) Bodø/Glimt
Tottenham Hotspur (England)	2–0	(Germany) Borussia Dortmund
Borussia Dortmund (Germany)	0–2	(Italy) Inter Milan

===== Eintracht Frankfurt =====
Pos	Team	Pld	W	D	L	GF	GA	GD	Pts
31	(Danish Football Association) Copenhagen	8	2	2	4	12	21	−9	8
32	(Royal Dutch Football Association) Ajax	8	2	0	6	8	21	−13	6
33	(German Football Association) Eintracht Frankfurt	8	1	1	6	10	21	−11	4
34	(Football Association of the Czech Republic) Slavia Prague	8	0	3	5	5	19	−14	3
35	(Royal Spanish Football Federation) Villarreal	8	0	1	7	5	18	−13	1

Source: UEFA
Rules for classification: League phase tiebreakers

Home team	Score	Away team
Eintracht Frankfurt (Germany)	5–1	(Turkey) Galatasaray
Atlético Madrid (Spain)	5–1	(Germany) Eintracht Frankfurt
Eintracht Frankfurt (Germany)	1–5	(England) Liverpool
Napoli (Italy)	0–0	(Germany) Eintracht Frankfurt
Eintracht Frankfurt (Germany)	0–3	(Italy) Atalanta
Barcelona (Spain)	2–1	(Germany) Eintracht Frankfurt
Qarabağ (Azerbaijan)	3–2	(Germany) Eintracht Frankfurt
Eintracht Frankfurt (Germany)	0–2	(England) Tottenham Hotspur

===== Bayer Leverkusen =====
Pos	Team	Pld	W	D	L	GF	GA	GD	Pts	Qualification
14	(Royal Spanish Football Federation) Atlético Madrid	8	4	1	3	17	15	+2	13	Advance to knockout phase play-offs (seeded)
15	(Italian Football Federation) Atalanta	8	4	1	3	10	10	0	13	Advance to knockout phase play-offs (seeded)
16	(German Football Association) Bayer Leverkusen	8	3	3	2	13	14	−1	12	Advance to knockout phase play-offs (seeded)
17	(German Football Association) Borussia Dortmund	8	3	2	3	19	17	+2	11	Advance to knockout phase play-offs (unseeded)
18	(Hellenic Football Federation) Olympiacos	8	3	2	3	10	14	−4	11	Advance to knockout phase play-offs (unseeded)

Source: UEFA
Rules for classification: League phase tiebreakers

Home team	Score	Away team
Copenhagen (Denmark)	2–2	(Germany) Bayer Leverkusen
Bayer Leverkusen (Germany)	1–1	(Netherlands) PSV Eindhoven
Bayer Leverkusen (Germany)	2–7	(France) Paris Saint-Germain
Benfica (Portugal)	0–1	(Germany) Bayer Leverkusen
Manchester City (England)	0–2	(Germany) Bayer Leverkusen
Bayer Leverkusen (Germany)	2–2	(England) Newcastle United
Olympiacos (Greece)	2–0	(Germany) Bayer Leverkusen
Bayer Leverkusen (Germany)	3–0	(Spain) Villarreal

===== Bayern Munich =====
Pos	Team	Pld	W	D	L	GF	GA	GD	Pts	Qualification
1	(The Football Association) Arsenal	8	8	0	0	23	4	+19	24	Advance to round of 16 (seeded)
2	(German Football Association) Bayern Munich	8	7	0	1	22	8	+14	21	Advance to round of 16 (seeded)
3	(The Football Association) Liverpool	8	6	0	2	20	8	+12	18	Advance to round of 16 (seeded)
4	(The Football Association) Tottenham Hotspur	8	5	2	1	17	7	+10	17	Advance to round of 16 (seeded)
5	(Royal Spanish Football Federation) Barcelona	8	5	1	2	22	14	+8	16	Advance to round of 16 (seeded)

Source: UEFA
Rules for classification: League phase tiebreakers

Home team	Score	Away team
Bayern Munich (Germany)	3–1	(England) Chelsea
Pafos (Cyprus)	1–5	(Germany) Bayern Munich
Bayern Munich (Germany)	4–0	(Belgium) Club Brugge
Paris Saint-Germain (France)	1–2	(Germany) Bayern Munich
Arsenal (England)	3–1	(Germany) Bayern Munich
Bayern Munich (Germany)	3–1	(Portugal) Sporting CP
Bayern Munich (Germany)	2–0	(Belgium) Union Saint-Gilloise
PSV Eindhoven (Netherlands)	1–2	(Germany) Bayern Munich

==== Knockout phase ====
===== Knockout phase play-offs =====
Team 1	Agg.	Team 2	1st leg	2nd leg
Borussia Dortmund (Germany)	3–4	(Italy) Atalanta	2–0	1–4
Olympiacos (Greece)	0–2	(Germany) Bayer Leverkusen	0–2	0–0

===== Round of 16 =====
Team 1	Agg.	Team 2	1st leg	2nd leg
Atalanta (Italy)	2–10	(Germany) Bayern Munich	1–6	1–4
Bayer Leverkusen (Germany)	1–3	(England) Arsenal	1–1	0–2

===== Quarter-finals =====
Team 1	Agg.	Team 2	1st leg	2nd leg
Real Madrid (Spain)	4–6	(Germany) Bayern Munich	1–2	3–4

===== Semi-finals =====
Team 1	Agg.	Team 2	1st leg	2nd leg
Paris Saint-Germain (France)	6–5	(Germany) Bayern Munich	5–4	1–1

=== UEFA Europa League ===
==== League phase ====
===== SC Freiburg =====
Pos	Team	Pld	W	D	L	GF	GA	GD	Pts	Qualification
5	(Portuguese Football Federation) Porto	8	5	2	1	13	7	+6	17 (Note: Away goals scored: Real Betis 5, Porto 3.)	Advance to round of 16 (seeded)
6	(Portuguese Football Federation) Braga	8	5	2	1	11	5	+6	17	Advance to round of 16 (seeded)
7	(German Football Association) SC Freiburg	8	5	2	1	10	4	+6	17	Advance to round of 16 (seeded)
8	(Italian Football Federation) Roma	8	5	1	2	13	6	+7	16	Advance to round of 16 (seeded)
9	(Royal Belgian Football Association) Genk	8	5	1	2	11	7	+4	16	Advance to knockout phase play-offs (seeded)

Source: UEFA
Rules for classification: League phase tiebreakers
Notes:

Home team	Score	Away team
SC Freiburg (Germany)	2–1	(Switzerland) Basel
Bologna (Italy)	1–1	(Germany) SC Freiburg
SC Freiburg (Germany)	2–0	(Netherlands) Utrecht
Nice (France)	1–3	(Germany) SC Freiburg
Viktoria Plzeň (Czech Republic)	0–0	(Germany) SC Freiburg
SC Freiburg (Germany)	1–0	(Austria) Red Bull Salzburg
SC Freiburg (Germany)	1–0	(Israel) Maccabi Tel Aviv
Lille (France)	1–0	(Germany) SC Freiburg

===== VfB Stuttgart =====
Pos	Team	Pld	W	D	L	GF	GA	GD	Pts	Qualification
9	(Royal Belgian Football Association) Genk	8	5	1	2	11	7	+4	16	Advance to knockout phase play-offs (seeded)
10	(Italian Football Federation) Bologna	8	4	3	1	14	7	+7	15	Advance to knockout phase play-offs (seeded)
11	(German Football Association) VfB Stuttgart	8	5	0	3	15	9	+6	15	Advance to knockout phase play-offs (seeded)
12	(Hungarian Football Federation) Ferencváros	8	4	3	1	12	11	+1	15	Advance to knockout phase play-offs (seeded)
13	(The Football Association) Nottingham Forest	8	4	2	2	15	7	+8	14	Advance to knockout phase play-offs (seeded)

Source: UEFA
Rules for classification: League phase tiebreakers

Home team	Score	Away team
VfB Stuttgart (Germany)	2–1	(Spain) Celta Vigo
Basel (Switzerland)	2–0	(Germany) VfB Stuttgart
Fenerbahçe (Turkey)	1–0	(Germany) VfB Stuttgart
VfB Stuttgart (Germany)	2–0	(Netherlands) Feyenoord
Go Ahead Eagles (Netherlands)	0–4	(Germany) VfB Stuttgart
VfB Stuttgart (Germany)	4–1	(Israel) Maccabi Tel Aviv
Roma (Italy)	2–0	(Germany) VfB Stuttgart
VfB Stuttgart (Germany)	3–2	(Switzerland) Young Boys

==== Knockout phase ====
===== Knockout phase play-offs =====
Team 1	Agg.	Team 2	1st leg	2nd leg
Celtic (Scotland)	2–4	(Germany) VfB Stuttgart	1–4	1–0

===== Round of 16 =====
Team 1	Agg.	Team 2	1st leg	2nd leg
Genk (Belgium)	2–5	(Germany) SC Freiburg	1–0	1–5
VfB Stuttgart (Germany)	1–4	(Portugal) Porto	1–2	0–2

===== Quarter-finals =====
Team 1	Agg.	Team 2	1st leg	2nd leg
SC Freiburg (Germany)	6–1	(Spain) Celta Vigo	3–0	3–1

===== Semi-finals =====
Team 1	Agg.	Team 2	1st leg	2nd leg
Braga (Portugal)	3–4	(Germany) SC Freiburg	2–1	1–3

===== Final =====
20 May 2026
21:00 (22:00 UTC+3)

SC Freiburg (Germany)	0–3	(The Football Association) Aston Villa
	Report	Tielemans 41'; Buendía 45+3'; Rogers 58'

Beşiktaş Stadium, Istanbul
Attendance: 37,324
Referee: François Letexier (France)

=== UEFA Conference League ===
==== Qualifying ====
===== Play-off round =====
Team 1	Agg.	Team 2	1st leg	2nd leg
Rosenborg (Norway)	3–5	(Germany) Mainz 05	2–1	1–4

==== League phase ====
===== Mainz 05 =====
Pos	Team	Pld	W	D	L	GF	GA	GD	Pts	Qualification
5	(Royal Spanish Football Federation) Rayo Vallecano	6	4	1	1	13	7	+6	13	Advance to round of 16 (seeded)
6	(Ukrainian Association of Football) Shakhtar Donetsk	6	4	1	1	10	5	+5	13	Advance to round of 16 (seeded)
7	(German Football Association) Mainz 05	6	4	1	1	7	3	+4	13	Advance to round of 16 (seeded)
8	(Cyprus Football Association) AEK Larnaca	6	3	3	0	7	1	+6	12	Advance to round of 16 (seeded)
9	(Swiss Football Association) Lausanne-Sport	6	3	2	1	6	3	+3	11	Advance to knockout phase play-offs (seeded)

Source: UEFA
Rules for classification: League phase tiebreakers

Home team	Score	Away team
Omonia (Cyprus)	0–1	(Germany) Mainz 05
Mainz 05 (Germany)	1–0	(Bosnia and Herzegovina) Zrinjski Mostar
Mainz 05 (Germany)	2–1	(Italy) Fiorentina
Universitatea Craiova (Romania)	1–0	(Germany) Mainz 05
Lech Poznań (Poland)	1–1	(Germany) Mainz 05
Mainz 05 (Germany)	2–0	(Turkey) Samsunspor

==== Knockout phase ====
===== Round of 16 =====
Team 1	Agg.	Team 2	1st leg	2nd leg
Sigma Olomouc (Czech Republic)	0–2	(Germany) Mainz 05	0–0	0–2

===== Quarter-finals =====
Team 1	Agg.	Team 2	1st leg	2nd leg
Mainz 05 (Germany)	2–4	(France) Strasbourg	2–0	0–4

=== UEFA Women's Champions League ===
==== Qualifying rounds ====
===== Third qualifying round =====
Third qualifying round
Team 1	Agg.	Team 2	1st leg	2nd leg
Eintracht Frankfurt (Germany)	1–5	(Spain) Real Madrid	1–2	0–3

==== League phase ====
===== Bayern Munich =====
Pos	Team	Pld	W	D	L	GF	GA	GD	Pts	Qualification
2	(French Football Federation) OL Lyonnes	6	5	1	0	18	5	+13	16	Advance to the quarter-finals (seeded)
3	(The Football Association) Chelsea	6	4	2	0	20	3	+17	14	Advance to the quarter-finals (seeded)
4	(German Football Association) Bayern Munich	6	4	1	1	14	13	+1	13	Advance to the quarter-finals (seeded)
5	(The Football Association) Arsenal	6	4	0	2	11	6	+5	12	Advance to the knockout phase play-offs (seeded)
6	(The Football Association) Manchester United	6	4	0	2	7	9	−2	12	Advance to the knockout phase play-offs (seeded)

Source: UEFA
Rules for classification: League phase tiebreakers

Home team	Score	Away team
Barcelona (Spain)	7–1	(Germany) Bayern Munich
Bayern Munich (Germany)	2–1	(Italy) Juventus
Bayern Munich (Germany)	3–2	(England) Arsenal
Paris Saint-Germain (France)	1–3	(Germany) Bayern Munich
Atlético Madrid (Spain)	2–2	(Germany) Bayern Munich
Bayern Munich (Germany)	3–0	(Norway) Vålerenga

===== VfL Wolfsburg =====
Pos	Team	Pld	W	D	L	GF	GA	GD	Pts	Qualification
7	(Royal Spanish Football Federation) Real Madrid	6	3	2	1	13	7	+6	11	Advance to the knockout phase play-offs (seeded)
8	(Italian Football Federation) Juventus	6	3	1	2	13	8	+5	10	Advance to the knockout phase play-offs (seeded)
9	(German Football Association) VfL Wolfsburg	6	3	0	3	13	10	+3	9	Advance to the knockout phase play-offs (unseeded)
10	(French Football Federation) Paris FC	6	2	2	2	6	9	−3	8	Advance to the knockout phase play-offs (unseeded)
11	(Royal Spanish Football Federation) Atlético Madrid	6	2	1	3	13	9	+4	7	Advance to the knockout phase play-offs (unseeded)

Source: UEFA
Rules for classification: League phase tiebreakers

Home team	Score	Away team
VfL Wolfsburg (Germany)	4–0	(France) Paris Saint-Germain
Vålerenga (Norway)	1–2	(Germany) VfL Wolfsburg
Lyon (France)	3–1	(Germany) VfL Wolfsburg
VfL Wolfsburg (Germany)	5–2	(England) Manchester United
Real Madrid (Spain)	2–0	(Germany) VfL Wolfsburg
VfL Wolfsburg (Germany)	1–2	(England) Chelsea

==== Knockout phase ====
===== Knockout phase play-offs =====
Team 1	Agg.	Team 2	1st leg	2nd leg
VfL Wolfsburg (Germany)	4–2	(Italy) Juventus	2–2	2–0

===== Quarter-finals =====
Team 1	Agg.	Team 2	1st leg	2nd leg
Manchester United (England)	3–5	(Germany) Bayern Munich	2–3	1–2
VfL Wolfsburg (Germany)	1–4	(France) Lyon	1–0	0–4 (a.e.t.)

===== Semi-finals =====
Team 1	Agg.	Team 2	1st leg	2nd leg
Bayern Munich (Germany)	3–5	(Spain) Barcelona	1–1	2–4

=== UEFA Women's Europa Cup ===
==== Qualifying rounds ====
===== Second qualifying round =====
Second qualifying round
Team 1	Agg.	Team 2	1st leg	2nd leg
Eintracht Frankfurt (Germany)	5–0	(Czech Republic) Slovácko	4–0	1–0

==== Knockout stage ====
===== Round of 16 =====
Round of 16
Team 1	Agg.	Team 2	1st leg	2nd leg
PSV Eindhoven (Netherlands)	2–5	(Germany) Eintracht Frankfurt	1–2	1–3

===== Quarter-finals =====
Quarter-finals
Team 1	Agg.	Team 2	1st leg	2nd leg
Eintracht Frankfurt (Germany)	7–2	(Denmark) Nordsjælland	4–0	3–2

===== Semi-finals =====
Quarter-finals
Team 1	Agg.	Team 2	1st leg	2nd leg
Eintracht Frankfurt (Germany)	1–3	(Sweden) BK Häcken	0–3	1–0
