= 2025–26 2. Frauen-Bundesliga =

2. Frauen-Bundesliga
- Season: 2025–26
- Dates: 23 August 2025 – 17 May 2026
- Champions: VfB Stuttgart
- Promoted: VfB Stuttgart; Mainz 05
- Relegated: Bayern Munich II; VfL Wolfsburg II; VfR Warbeyen
- Matches: 182
- Goals: 645 (3.54 per match)
- Top goalscorer: Vital Kats (22 goals)
- Biggest home win: Meppen 8–0 Warbeyen
- Biggest away win: Wolfsburg II 1–9 Stuttgart
- Highest scoring: Wolfsburg II 1–9 Stuttgart
- Longest winning run: 5 games Mainz; Stuttgart
- Longest unbeaten run: 9 games Stuttgart
- Longest winless run: 15 games Warbeyen
- Longest losing run: 3 games Wolfsburg II
- Attendance: 100,017 (550 per match)

The 2025–26 season of the 2. Frauen-Bundesliga was the 22nd season of Germany's second-tier women's football league. It ran from 23 August 2025 to 17 May 2026.

The fixtures were announced on 15 July 2025.

== Teams ==
Locations of teams in the 2025–26 2. Frauen-Bundesliga

=== Team changes ===
Entering league		Exiting league	
Promoted from 2024–25 Regionalliga	Relegated from 2024–25 Bundesliga	Promoted to 2025–26 Bundesliga	Relegated to 2025–26 Regionalliga
Viktoria Berlin; VfR Warbeyen; Mainz 05; VfB Stuttgart; VfL Wolfsburg II	Turbine Potsdam	1. FC Nürnberg; Union Berlin; Hamburger SV	SV Weinberg; SC Freiburg II; FSV Gütersloh

- Hamburger SV II did not take their spot after winning the Regionalliga, moving the promoted spot to the next best-placed team.

=== Stadiums ===
Team	Home city	Home ground	Capacity
SG Andernach	Andernach	Stadion am Bassenheimer Weg	15,220
Viktoria Berlin	Berlin	Stadion Lichterfelde	4,300
VfL Bochum	Bochum	Leichtathletikplatz am Ruhrstadion	1,500
Eintracht Frankfurt II	Frankfurt	Stadion am Brentanobad	5,200
FC Ingolstadt	Ingolstadt	ESV-Stadion	11,481
Mainz 05	Mainz	Bruchwegstadion	18,700
SV Meppen	Meppen	Hänsch-Arena	16,500
Borussia Mönchengladbach	Mönchengladbach	Grenzlandstadion	10,000
Bayern Munich II	Munich	Sportpark Aschheim	3,000
Turbine Potsdam	Potsdam	Karl-Liebknecht-Stadion	10,787
SC Sand	Willstätt	Kühnmatt Stadion	2,000
VfB Stuttgart	Stuttgart	Stadion Hafenbahnstraße	2,000
VfR Warbeyen	Kleve	Bresserbergstadion	6,000
VfL Wolfsburg II	Wolfsburg	AOK Stadion	5,200

== League table ==
Pos	Team	Pld	W	D	L	GF	GA	GD	Pts	Qualification or relegation
1	VfB Stuttgart (C, P)	26	17	7	2	81	33	+48	58	Promotion to Bundesliga
2	Mainz 05 (P)	26	17	4	5	77	29	+48	55	Promotion to Bundesliga
3	SC Sand	26	16	5	5	53	26	+27	53	
4	SV Meppen	26	15	4	7	56	26	+30	49	
5	Viktoria Berlin	26	12	9	5	41	20	+21	45	
6	SG Andernach	26	10	8	8	46	44	+2	38	
7	FC Ingolstadt	26	12	2	12	45	48	−3	38	
8	Eintracht Frankfurt II (Note: Reserve teams cannot compete in the Frauen-Bundesliga and are therefore ineligible for promotion.)	26	9	6	11	38	38	0	33	
9	VfL Bochum	26	9	5	12	33	40	−7	32	
10	Borussia Mönchengladbach	26	9	4	13	39	53	−14	31	
11	Turbine Potsdam	26	9	3	14	37	50	−13	30	
12	Bayern Munich II (R)	26	8	3	15	40	64	−24	27	Relegation to Regionalliga
13	VfL Wolfsburg II (R)	26	6	1	19	38	75	−37	19	Relegation to Regionalliga
14	VfR Warbeyen (R)	26	1	3	22	21	99	−78	6	Relegation to Regionalliga

Source: DFB
Rules for classification: 1) Points; 2) Goal difference; 3) Goals scored; 4) Head-to-head results; 5) Head-to-head away goals scored; 6) Away goals scored; 7) Play-off.
(C) Champions; (P) Promoted; (R) Relegated

== Results ==
Home \ Away	AND	BER	BOC	FR2	ING	MAI	MEP	MÖN	MU2	POT	SAN	STU	WAR	WO2
SG Andernach	—	0–2	0–1	0–0	0–3	3–0	0–4	5–1	3–0	2–1	1–1	1–1	2–1	2–0
Viktoria Berlin	2–2	—	0–0	1–0	0–1	1–1	2–0	1–0	7–0	0–2	1–1	0–0	3–0	1–1
VfL Bochum	1–1	0–3	—	0–2	0–1	2–3	0–1	1–4	1–0	0–0	5–1	0–2	6–0	0–2
Eintracht Frankfurt II	2–2	0–2	1–2	—	2–4	2–0	0–0	1–1	0–1	3–0	3–1	1–4	1–0	1–2
FC Ingolstadt	3–2	1–0	2–0	1–1	—	1–3	0–4	1–2	3–1	3–0	0–1	2–3	1–2	3–2
Mainz 05	5–2	0–0	3–0	3–0	5–0	—	0–0	3–0	6–0	2–2	0–1	4–5	6–1	7–1
SV Meppen	1–2	3–0	2–1	2–3	3–2	1–3	—	1–0	5–2	2–1	1–1	1–0	8–0	4–3
Borussia Mönchengladbach	4–5	1–1	0–2	1–4	4–2	1–3	1–0	—	1–3	3–2	0–4	1–1	2–1	5–0
Bayern Munich II	1–1	0–3	1–1	1–3	1–5	1–4	1–0	0–2	—	6–0	1–2	2–2	6–1	3–2
Turbine Potsdam	2–0	0–2	2–3	2–1	2–0	0–4	1–1	1–3	4–3	—	1–0	0–3	3–0	1–3
SC Sand	4–0	2–1	1–1	2–1	3–0	2–0	0–3	2–0	2–0	4–0	—	2–2	7–1	4–0
VfB Stuttgart	3–3	2–2	6–0	4–3	5–1	2–4	2–0	3–1	3–0	2–1	2–0	—	7–2	4–1
VfR Warbeyen	1–5	2–3	1–3	1–1	2–2	0–5	1–4	1–1	1–2	0–6	1–3	0–4	—	1–2
VfL Wolfsburg II	0–2	1–3	1–3	1–2	0–3	1–3	0–5	5–0	2–4	0–3	0–2	1–9	6–0	—

Source: DFB
Legend: Blue = home team win; Yellow = draw; Red = away team win.

== Statistics ==
=== Top scorers ===
Rank	Player	Club	Goals
1	(Israel) Vital Kats	Mainz 05	22
2	(Austria) Nicole Billa	VfB Stuttgart	19
3	(Germany) Chiara Bouziane	Mainz 05	18
4	(Germany) Pija Reininger	SC Sand	15
5	(Germany) Laura Bröring	SV Meppen	14
5	(Germany) Elira Terakaj	Bayern Munich II	14
7	(Germany) Nadine Anstatt	Mainz 05	12
7	(Poland) Julia Matuschewski	SC Sand	12
9	(Germany) Maximiliane Rall	VfB Stuttgart	10
10	(Germany) Kara Bathmann	Mainz 05	9
10	(Germany) Nina Ehegötz	Viktoria Berlin	9
10	(Germany) Anna-Lena Fritz	FC Ingolstadt	9
10	(Germany) Dörthe Hoppius	VfL Bochum	9
10	(Norway) Anny Kerim-Lindland	VfL Wolfsburg II	9
10	(Japan) Rana Okuma	Turbine Potsdam	9
10	(Norway) Linnea Sælen	VfL Wolfsburg II	9

=== Hat-tricks ===
Player	Club	Against	Result	Date
(Germany) Dörthe Hoppius^{4}	VfL Bochum	VfR Warbeyen	6–0 (H)	24 August 2025
(Germany) Laura Bröring^{4}	SV Meppen	VfR Warbeyen	8–0 (H)	14 November 2025
(Israel) Vital Kats	Mainz 05	VfL Wolfsburg II	7–1 (H)	23 November 2025
(Germany) Maximiliane Rall	VfB Stuttgart	VfL Wolfsburg II	9–1 (A)	7 December 2025
(Israel) Vital Kats	Mainz 05	VfR Warbeyen	6–1 (H)	14 December 2025
(Germany) Elira Terakaj	Bayern Munich II	VfR Warbeyen	6–1 (H)	22 February 2026
(Israel) Vital Kats	Mainz 05	VfB Stuttgart	4–2 (A)	21 March 2026

- ^{4} Player scored four goals.

=== Clean sheets ===
Rank	Player	Club	Clean sheets
1	(Germany) Jule Baum	SC Sand	9
2	(Germany) Kiara Beck	VfB Stuttgart	8
3	(Germany) Thea Farwick	SV Meppen	7
3	(Japan) Mamiko Matsumoto	Eintracht Frankfurt II	7
5	(Germany) Sarah Rolle	VfL Bochum	6
5	(Germany) Melanie Wagner	Viktoria Berlin	6
7	(Germany) Elena Bläser	SG Andernach	5
8	(Germany) Janne Krumme	Eintracht Frankfurt II	4
8	(Germany) Franziska Maier	FC Ingolstadt	4
8	(Switzerland) Silia Plöchinger	Turbine Potsdam	4
