= 2024–25 Frauen-Regionalliga Südwest =

Frauen-Regionalliga Südwest
- Season: 2024–25
- Dates: 1 September 2024 – 25 May 2025
- Matches played: 132
- Goals scored: 579 (4.39 per match)
- Top goalscorer: (Germany) Nadine Anstatt (31 goals)
- Biggest home win: 1. FSV Mainz 05 13–0 SV Dirmingen; 17 November 2024; SV Elversberg 13–0 SV Dirmingen; 18 May 2025
- Biggest away win: SG 99 Andernach II 0–8 1. FSV Mainz 05; 23 March 2025; SV Dirmingen 0–8 1. FSV Mainz 05; 25 May 2025
- Highest scoring: 1. FSV Mainz 05 13–0 SV Dirmingen; 17 November 2024
- Longest winning run: 8 matches 1. FSV Mainz 05
- Longest unbeaten run: 11 matches 1. FSV Mainz 05
- Longest winless run: 22 matches SV Dirmingen
- Longest losing run: 18 matches SV Dirmingen
- Highest attendance: 1,200; 1. FSV Mainz 05 0–0 1. FC Saarbrücken; 18 May 2025
- Lowest attendance: 20; 1. FFC Montabaur 2–1 SG 99 Andernach II; 15 September 2024; SV Dirmingen 0–5 1. FFC Montabaur; 11 May 2025
- Attendance: 10,928 (83 per match)
- All statistics correct as of 25 May 2025.

The 2024–25 season of the Frauen-Regionalliga Südwest was the 21st season of the top league of Southwest German Football Association in women's football. The 2024–25 Regionalliga Südwest was one of the five regional leagues that serve as the third-tier women's league in Germany.

The first and last matchdays of the 2024–25 season took place on 1 September 2024 and 25 May 2025, respectively.

== Teams ==
Locations of teams in the 2024–25 Frauen-Regionalliga Südwest.

=== Team changes ===
Entering league		Exiting league	
Promoted from 2023 to 2024 lower-level leagues (Note: Since FC Bitburg, the champion of Rheinlandliga, refused the promotion, only two teams were promoted and relegated as a result of the 2023–24 season.)	Relegated from 2023–24 2. Bundesliga	Promoted to 2024–25 2. Bundesliga	Relegated to 2024–25 lower-level leagues
SV Dirmingen (from Verbandsliga Saarland; Wormatia Worms (from Verbandsliga Südwest)			TuS Wörrstadt (to Verbandsliga Südwest); SV Holzbach (to Rheinlandliga)

=== Promotion from lower-level leagues ===
The three champions of Rheinlandliga, Verbandsliga Saarland and Verbandsliga Südwest are promoted.

== Standings ==
Pos	Team	Pld	W	D	L	GF	GA	GD	Pts	Qualification or relegation
1	1. FSV Mainz 05 (P)	22	20	1	1	115	4	+111	61	Promotion to 2. Bundesliga
2	1. FC Saarbrücken	22	18	1	3	61	14	+47	55	
3	SC 13 Bad Neuenahr	22	16	1	5	55	20	+35	49	
4	SV Elversberg	22	14	3	5	71	20	+51	45	
5	1. FFC Montabaur	22	12	2	8	51	44	+7	38	
6	1. FC Riegelsberg	22	11	2	9	55	37	+18	35	
7	TuS Issel	22	11	1	10	46	38	+8	34	
8	SC Siegelbach	22	7	1	14	24	49	−25	22	
9	SG 99 Andernach II (Note: Reserve teams cannot compete at the same league level as the respective main team. Ineligible for promotion unless the main team earns promotion to Bundesliga.)	22	5	4	13	33	66	−33	19	
10	SV Ober-Olm	22	4	2	16	26	78	−52	14	
11	Wormatia Worms	22	3	3	16	32	81	−49	12	
12	SV Dirmingen (R)	22	0	1	21	10	128	−118	1	Relegation to lower-level leagues

Updated to match(es) played on 25 May 2025. Source: Fussball.de
Rules for classification: Tiebreakers
(P) Promoted; (R) Relegated

== Results ==
Home \ Away	AN2	BDN	DIR	ELV	ISS	MAI	MON	OOL	RIE	SAA	SIE	WOR
SG 99 Andernach II		2–3	7–0	0–3	1–5	0–8	1–1	4–1	4–5	0–5	2–1	0–0
SC 13 Bad Neuenahr	3–0		7–0	1–0	5–0	0–4	1–2	6–0	2–1	2–1	1–0	3–0
SV Dirmingen	0–5	1–7		0–4	0–5	0–8	0–5	1–3	0–7	0–5	1–4	4–4
SV Elversberg	6–0	0–0	13–0		4–0	0–5	3–1	4–1	0–1	1–0	6–0	5–0
TuS Issel	4–0	2–1	5–1	0–2		0–3	4–0	4–1	0–0	0–2	1–2	4–2
1. FSV Mainz 05	10–0	3–1	13–0	2–1	5–0		10–0	11–0	2–0	0–0	5–0	10–0
1. FFC Montabaur	2–1	0–1	3–1	2–4	3–1	0–4		3–2	4–0	2–3	3–1	3–2
SV Ober-Olm	0–0	0–2	5–1	0–6	1–5	0–3	1–1		1–6	0–5	4–1	3–2
1. FC Riegelsberg	2–3	1–2	6–0	4–4	0–2	0–2	1–4	3–1		0–2	2–1	7–1
1. FC Saarbrücken	4–2	3–0	3–0	1–0	3–0	2–1	1–0	4–1	0–1		2–1	7–0
SC Siegelbach	2–0	0–1	2–0	1–1	2–1	0–2 (Note: Match awarded as SC Siegelbach did not have enough players to field a team.)	0–7	1–0	0–2	2–6		3–0
Wormatia Worms	1–1	0–6	7–0	1–4	0–3	0–4	2–5	5–1	2–6	1–2	2–0	

Updated to match(es) played on 25 May 2025. Source: Fussball.de
Legend: Blue = home team win; Yellow = draw; Red = away team win.

== Top goalscorers ==
As of 25 May 2025

Rank	Player	Team	Goals
1	(Germany) Nadine Anstatt	1. FSV Mainz 05	31
2	(Germany) Marie Fischer	1. FFC Montabaur	22
3	(Israel) Vital Kats	1. FSV Mainz 05	19
4	(Germany) Chelsea Agyei	1. FC Saarbrücken	14
5	(Kosovo) Rinesa Alija	SG 99 Andernach II	12
5	(Germany) Sonja Maria Bartoschek	SC 13 Bad Neuenahr	12
5	(Germany) Melanie Jung	1. FC Riegelsberg	12
8	(Germany) Kara Bathmann	1. FSV Mainz 05	10
8	(Germany) Lea Körner	1. FC Saarbrücken	10
8	(Germany) Lena Reiter	SV Elversberg	10
8	(Germany) Tina Ruh	Wormatia Worms	10
8	(Germany) Jacqueline de Backer	1. FC Riegelsberg	10
