= 2023–24 2. Frauen-Bundesliga =

2. Frauen-Bundesliga
- Season: 2023–24
- Dates: 19 August 2023 – 26 May 2024
- Champions: Turbine Potsdam
- Promoted: Turbine Potsdam; Carl Zeiss Jena
- Relegated: VfL Wolfsburg II; TSG Hoffenheim II
- Matches played: 182
- Goals scored: 525 (2.88 per match)
- Top goalscorer: Larissa Mühlhaus (20 goals)
- Biggest home win: Gütersloh 6–0 Hoffenheim II
- Biggest away win: Weinberg 0–7 Frankfurt II
- Highest scoring: Wolfsburg II 2–7 Jena
- Longest winning run: 5 games Sand
- Longest unbeaten run: 6 games Sand
- Longest winless run: 6 games Hoffenheim II
- Longest losing run: 6 games Hoffenheim II
- Attendance: 64,223 (353 per match)

The 2023–24 season of the 2. Frauen-Bundesliga was the 20th season of Germany's second-tier women's football league. It ran from 19 August 2023 to 26 May 2024.

The fixtures were announced on 14 July 2023.

== Teams ==
Locations of teams in the 2023–24 2. Frauen-Bundesliga

=== Team changes ===
Entering league		Exiting league	
Promoted from 2022–23 Regionalliga	Relegated from 2022–23 Bundesliga	Promoted to 2023–24 Bundesliga	Relegated to 2023–24 Regionalliga
SV 67 Weinberg; Borussia Mönchengladbach; Hamburger SV	SV Meppen; Turbine Potsdam	RB Leipzig; 1. FC Nürnberg	1. FC Köln II; Turbine Potsdam II; SC Freiburg II

=== Stadiums ===
Team	Home city	Home ground	Capacity
SG Andernach	Andernach	Stadion am Bassenheimer Weg	15,220
Eintracht Frankfurt II	Frankfurt	Stadion am Brentanobad	5,200
FSV Gütersloh	Gütersloh	Tönnies-Arena	4,252
Hamburger SV	Hamburg	Paul-Hauenschild-Anlage	1,000
TSG Hoffenheim II	Sinsheim	Ensinger-Stadion	4,000
FC Ingolstadt	Ingolstadt	ESV-Stadion	11,481
Carl Zeiss Jena	Jena	Ernst-Abbe-Sportfeld	10,445
SV Meppen	Meppen	Hänsch-Arena	16,500
Borussia Mönchengladbach	Mönchengladbach	Grenzlandstadion	10,000
Bayern Munich II	Munich	FC Bayern Campus	2,500
Turbine Potsdam	Potsdam	Karl-Liebknecht-Stadion	10,787
SC Sand	Willstätt	Kühnmatt Stadion	2,000
SV 67 Weinberg	Aurach	Sportanlage Weinberg	1,000
VfL Wolfsburg II	Wolfsburg	AOK Stadion	5,200

== League table ==
Pos	Team	Pld	W	D	L	GF	GA	GD	Pts	Qualification or relegation
1	Turbine Potsdam (C, P)	26	17	4	5	37	18	+19	55	Promotion to Bundesliga
2	Carl Zeiss Jena (P)	26	16	6	4	58	28	+30	54	Promotion to Bundesliga
3	SV Meppen	26	16	5	5	46	14	+32	53	
4	Hamburger SV	26	15	5	6	58	33	+25	50	
5	SG Andernach	26	13	7	6	42	32	+10	46	
6	SC Sand	26	12	7	7	45	32	+13	43	
7	FSV Gütersloh	26	12	6	8	46	39	+7	42	
8	Eintracht Frankfurt II (Note: Reserve teams cannot compete in the Frauen-Bundesliga and are therefore ineligible for promotion.)	26	11	4	11	33	35	−2	37	
9	Borussia Mönchengladbach	26	8	7	11	31	38	−7	31	
10	FC Ingolstadt	26	7	6	13	26	43	−17	27	
11	Bayern Munich II	26	6	5	15	33	42	−9	23	
12	SV 67 Weinberg (Note: Although finishing in 12th place and in the relegation zone, Weinberg was not relegated as MSV Duisburg did not take their spot in the 2024–25 2. Frauen-Bundesliga.)	26	5	5	16	31	62	−31	20	
13	VfL Wolfsburg II (R)	26	4	4	18	20	60	−40	16	Relegation to Regionalliga
14	TSG Hoffenheim II (R)	26	3	3	20	19	49	−30	12	Relegation to Regionalliga

Source: DFB
Rules for classification: 1) Points; 2) Goal difference; 3) Goals scored; 4) Head-to-head results; 5) Head-to-head away goals scored; 6) Away goals scored; 7) Play-off.
(C) Champions; (P) Promoted; (R) Relegated

== Results ==
Home \ Away	AND	FR2	GÜT	HAM	HO2	ING	JEN	MEP	MÖN	MU2	POT	SAN	WEI	WO2
SG Andernach	—	2–0	1–1	0–4	0–0	2–1	2–1	0–2	2–1	2–0	2–2	0–3	4–4	3–1
Eintracht Frankfurt II	0–1	—	1–1	1–4	2–1	4–0	2–3	0–1	1–0	1–0	0–3	1–0	3–3	1–0
FSV Gütersloh	1–4	2–0	—	0–3	6–0	2–1	1–4	1–1	4–0	3–1	0–1	0–4	2–1	5–1
Hamburger SV	1–1	2–2	4–1	—	2–0	0–1	5–0	4–3	2–2	1–4	1–1	2–1	2–0	4–0
TSG Hoffenheim II	0–2	1–2	0–2	0–1	—	1–1	0–2	0–2	3–1	0–2	0–3	1–2	0–0	1–0
FC Ingolstadt	0–2	0–1	1–4	2–3	1–4	—	0–4	2–0	0–0	1–0	1–2	1–1	1–0	2–0
Carl Zeiss Jena	1–0	3–0	1–1	3–1	2–0	0–3	—	0–0	2–2	3–1	3–1	1–1	3–1	3–0
SV Meppen	0–1	2–0	0–1	4–0	2–0	2–0	0–0	—	0–0	5–0	1–0	3–0	3–0	5–1
Borussia Mönchengladbach	4–3	0–2	1–2	1–1	3–2	2–2	1–0	0–2	—	2–1	0–1	1–1	2–0	1–0
Bayern Munich II	1–1	4–0	4–1	1–2	1–0	0–1	2–5	0–0	1–3	—	0–1	2–2	1–1	1–2
Turbine Potsdam	1–1	2–0	2–0	2–0	1–0	1–1	0–1	1–3	2–1	1–0	—	1–0	3–1	1–0
SC Sand	0–1	0–2	0–0	1–0	3–2	4–1	2–2	1–2	3–2	3–2	2–0	—	5–4	2–0
SV 67 Weinberg	1–4	0–7	2–4	2–3	3–1	3–1	0–4	2–1	1–0	0–3	0–1	0–0	—	1–4
VfL Wolfsburg II	2–1	0–0	1–1	0–6	3–2	1–1	2–7	0–2	0–1	1–1	0–3	1–4	0–1	—

Source: DFB
Legend: Blue = home team win; Yellow = draw; Red = away team win.

== Statistics ==
=== Top scorers ===
Rank	Player	Club	Goals
1	(Germany) Larissa Mühlhaus	Hamburger SV	19
2	(Germany) Luca-Emily Birkholz	Carl Zeiss Jena	13
3	(Germany) Carolin Schraa	SG Andernach	11
4	(Germany) Dana Marquardt	Hamburger SV	10
5	(Poland) Julia Matuschewski	SC Sand	9
5	(Germany) Leonie Stöhr	SG Andernach	9
7	(Germany) Shpresa Aradani	FSV Gütersloh	8
7	(Germany) Lisa Wich	SV 67 Weinberg	8
9	(Germany) Toma Ihlenburg	SV Meppen	7
9	(Germany) Vildan Kardeşler	SV Meppen	7
9	(Germany) Laura Radke	Borussia Mönchengladbach	7
9	(Germany) Kim Schneider	Turbine Potsdam	7
9	(Germany) Jette ter Horst	Carl Zeiss Jena	7

=== Hat-tricks ===
Player	Club	Against	Result	Date
(Poland) Julia Matuschewski	SC Sand	Borussia Mönchengladbach	3–2 (H)	1 October 2023
(Germany) Christina Alp	TSG Hoffenheim II	FC Ingolstadt	4–1 (A)	12 May 2024
(Germany) Luca-Emily Birkholz^{4}	Carl Zeiss Jena	SV 67 Weinberg	4–0 (A)	19 May 2024

^{4} Player scored four goals

=== Clean sheets ===
Rank	Player	Club	Clean sheets
1	(Germany) Laura Sieger	SV Meppen	17
2	(Germany) Vanessa Fischer	Turbine Potsdam	13
3	(Germany) Jasmin Janning	Carl Zeiss Jena	8
4	(Germany) Laura van der Laan	SG Andernach	7
5	(Germany) Luisa Palmen	Borussia Mönchengladbach	6
5	(Germany) Sarah Rolle	FSV Gütersloh	6
7	(Germany) Lina Altenburg	Eintracht Frankfurt II	5
7	(Germany) Stella Busse	SC Sand	5
9	(Germany) Anna-Lena Daum	FC Ingolstadt	4
9	(Germany) Hannah Johann	Eintracht Frankfurt II	4
9	(Germany) Franziska Maier	FC Ingolstadt	4
9	(Germany) Lela-Celin Naward	Hamburger SV	4
9	(Germany) Juliane Schmid	Bayern Munich II	4
