= 2021–22 2. Frauen-Bundesliga =

2. Frauen-Bundesliga
- Season: 2021–22
- Dates: 15 August 2021 – 5 June 2022
- Champions: SV Meppen
- Promoted: SV Meppen; MSV Duisburg
- Relegated: SV Elversberg; SV Henstedt-Ulzburg; Borussia Bocholt
- Matches played: 182
- Goals scored: 636 (3.49 per match)
- Top goalscorer: Nastassja Lein; Ramona Maier (25 goals)
- Biggest home win: Gütersloh 6–0 Wolfsburg II
- Biggest away win: Bocholt 1–9 Leipzig
- Highest scoring: Bocholt 1–9 Leipzig
- Longest winning run: 5 games Meppen
- Longest unbeaten run: 5 games Meppen
- Longest winless run: 7 games Wolfsburg II
- Longest losing run: 4 games Wolfsburg II
- Attendance: 26,407 (145 per match) (Note: Due to the COVID-19 pandemic in Germany, each local health department allows a different number of spectators.)

The 2021–22 2. Frauen-Bundesliga was the 18th season of Germany's second-tier women's football league, and the fourth as a single-division league. The season began on 15 August 2021 and concluded on 5 June 2022. The champions and runners-up will be promoted to the Frauen-Bundesliga, while the bottom three teams will be relegated to the Frauen-Regionalliga.

The fixtures were announced on 23 July 2021.

== Teams ==
Locations of teams in the 2021–22 2. Frauen-Bundesliga

=== Team changes ===
Entering league		Exiting league		
Promoted from 2020–21 Regionalliga	Relegated from 2020–21 Bundesliga	Promoted to 2021–22 Bundesliga	Relegated to 2021–22 Regionalliga	
SV Elversberg (previously SV Göttelborn); SV Henstedt-Ulzburg; 1. FC Nürnberg	SV Meppen; MSV Duisburg	Carl Zeiss Jena; 1. FC Köln	Borussia Mönchengladbach; Turbine Potsdam II; Arminia Bielefeld; SpVg Berghofen	BV Cloppenburg; 1. FC Saarbrücken; Würzburger Kickers; 1. FFC 08 Niederkirchen

=== Stadiums ===
Team	Home city	Home ground	Capacity
SG Andernach	Andernach	Stadion am Bassenheimer Weg	15,220
Borussia Bocholt	Bocholt	In der Hardt	1,500
MSV Duisburg	Duisburg	MSV-Arena	31,514
SV Elversberg	Spiesen-Elversberg	Waldstadion an der Kaiserlinde	9,970
Eintracht Frankfurt II	Frankfurt	Stadion am Brentanobad	5,200
FSV Gütersloh	Gütersloh	Tönnies-Arena	4,252
SV Henstedt-Ulzburg	Henstedt-Ulzburg	Stadion Schäferkampsweg	1,500
1899 Hoffenheim II	Sinsheim	Ensinger-Stadion	4,000
FC Ingolstadt	Ingolstadt	ESV-Stadion	11,481
RB Leipzig	Leipzig	Sportanlage Gontardweg	1,300
SV Meppen	Meppen	Hänsch-Arena	16,500
Bayern Munich II	Aschheim	Sportpark Aschheim	3,000
1. FC Nürnberg	Nuremberg	Sportpark Valznerweiher	7,000
VfL Wolfsburg II	Wolfsburg	AOK Stadion	5,200

== League table ==
Pos	Team	Pld	W	D	L	GF	GA	GD	Pts	Qualification or relegation
1	SV Meppen (Note: The Bayern Munich v SV Meppen match from 1 May 2022, originally ended in a 2–0 win for Munich, was counted as a 2–0 win for Meppen afterwards after Munich fielded an ineligible player.) (C, P)	26	19	4	3	64	20	+44	61	Promotion to Bundesliga
2	MSV Duisburg (P)	26	19	3	4	59	26	+33	60	Promotion to Bundesliga
3	RB Leipzig	26	17	2	7	70	46	+24	53	
4	SG Andernach	26	14	5	7	54	33	+21	47	
5	Eintracht Frankfurt II (Note: Reserve teams cannot compete in the Frauen-Bundesliga and are therefore ineligible for promotion.)	26	12	7	7	56	38	+18	43	
6	1. FC Nürnberg	26	13	2	11	47	43	+4	41	
7	Bayern Munich II	26	12	3	11	43	47	−4	39	
8	FSV Gütersloh	26	9	5	12	45	46	−1	32	
9	1899 Hoffenheim II	26	7	7	12	28	38	−10	28	
10	VfL Wolfsburg II	26	7	7	12	26	41	−15	28	
11	FC Ingolstadt	26	8	3	15	52	56	−4	27	
12	SV Elversberg (R)	26	6	4	16	25	57	−32	22	Relegation to Regionalliga
13	SV Henstedt-Ulzburg (R)	26	5	4	17	36	74	−38	19	Relegation to Regionalliga
14	Borussia Bocholt (R)	26	5	2	19	31	71	−40	17	Relegation to Regionalliga

Source: DFB
Rules for classification: 1) Points; 2) Goal difference; 3) Goals scored; 4) Head-to-head points; 5) Head-to-head goal difference; 6) Head-to-head goals scored; 7) Head-to-head away goals scored; 8) Away goals scored; 9) Play-off.
(C) Champions; (P) Promoted; (R) Relegated

== Results ==
Home \ Away	AND	BOC	DUI	ELV	FR2	GÜT	HEN	HO2	ING	LEI	MEP	MU2	NÜR	WO2
SG Andernach	—	3–1	3–1	4–2	1–1	3–3	3–1	2–3	2–3	5–0	1–3	2–1	0–1	3–0
Borussia Bocholt	0–4	—	0–2	2–2	2–8	1–2	0–1	2–1	1–2	1–9	1–3	0–3	0–4	1–1
MSV Duisburg	3–0	3–0	—	6–1	2–2	1–0	4–2	1–1	3–2	6–1	3–0	2–1	1–0	1–0
SV Elversberg	1–1	2–0	1–5	—	1–0	2–0	1–2	0–4	1–5	0–3	0–2	1–2	0–1	1–2
Eintracht Frankfurt II	2–2	3–2	1–3	4–1	—	2–0	6–1	4–2	4–1	2–2	1–2	3–1	1–2	2–2
FSV Gütersloh	0–1	3–1	1–2	0–0	0–1	—	4–1	1–1	0–4	1–4	0–1	3–1	3–4	6–0
SV Henstedt-Ulzburg	1–3	2–4	1–3	0–0	1–4	2–5	—	1–1	1–5	2–3	1–7	3–1	3–1	1–2
1899 Hoffenheim II	0–3	0–2	1–0	0–2	1–1	0–0	4–1	—	2–1	0–3	0–3	0–1	4–1	0–3
FC Ingolstadt	0–1	1–2	1–2	3–5	0–1	3–5	2–2	1–0	—	2–3	0–4	3–3	1–2	2–0
RB Leipzig	0–1	3–2	3–0	3–0	4–0	6–1	3–1	2–0	4–3	—	4–2	2–3	2–1	0–0
SV Meppen	1–1	3–1	2–0	5–0	2–0	2–2	1–2	1–0	0–0	5–0	—	3–0	2–1	2–0
Bayern Munich II	0–3	4–5	1–1	1–0	2–1	2–0	4–2	1–1	3–1	3–1	0–2 (Note: The Bayern Munich v SV Meppen match from 1 May 2022, originally ended in a 2–0 win for Munich, was counted as a 2–0 win for Meppen afterwards after Munich fielded an ineligible player.)	—	0–3	4–1
1. FC Nürnberg	4–2	1–0	1–2	0–1	0–0	0–2	2–0	1–2	1–5	4–3	2–6	4–0	—	3–3
VfL Wolfsburg II	1–0	1–0	0–2	2–0	1–2	1–3	1–1	0–0	4–1	1–2	0–0	0–1	0–3	—

Source: DFB
Legend: Blue = home team win; Yellow = draw; Red = away team win.

== Top scorers ==
Rank	Player	Club	Goals
1	(Germany) Nastassja Lein	1. FC Nürnberg	25
1	(Germany) Ramona Maier	FC Ingolstadt	25
3	(Germany) Vanessa Fudalla	RB Leipzig	17
4	(Germany) Annalena Rieke	FSV Gütersloh	14
4	(Germany) Julia Schermuly	SG 99 Andernach	14
6	(Germany) Alexandra Emmerling	SV Meppen	13
6	(Germany) Indra Hahn	SV Henstedt-Ulzburg	13
6	(Germany) Marlene Müller	RB Leipzig	13
9	(Germany) Isabella Jaron	SV Meppen	12
10	(Poland) Agnieszka Winczo	SV Meppen	10
