= Ivana Slipčević =

Croatian footballer

Personal information
- Date of birth: 23 August 1998 (age 28)
- Height: 1.65 m (5 ft 5 in)
- Position: Forward

Team information
- Current team: FSV Mainz 05
- Number: 23

Youth career
- 2005–2006: FC Hertha Munich
- 2007–2009: FC Croatia Munich
- 2010–2015: Bayern Munich

College career
Years	Team	Apps	(Gls)
2018–2020	ASA College Silver Storm	17	(6)

Senior career*
Years	Team	Apps	(Gls)
2015–2019	Bayern Munich II	48	(6)
2017	Bayern Munich	1	(0)
2020	Freiburg II	2	(0)
2021–2025	FC Ingolstadt 04	86	(6)
2025–2026	SC Sand	24	(2)
2026–	FSV Mainz 05	2	(0)

International career^{‡}
2016–	Croatia	27	(2)
- * Club domestic league appearances and goals as of 13 September 2026 ‡ National team caps and goals as of 10 July 2026

Ivana Slipčević (born 23 August 1998) is a Croatian footballer who plays as a forward for Frauen-Bundesliga club 1. FSV Mainz 05 and the Croatia women's national team.

== Career ==
Slipčević has been capped for the Croatia national team, appearing for the team during the 2019 FIFA Women's World Cup qualifying cycle.
