= Ebru Uzungüney =

German-born Turkish footballer

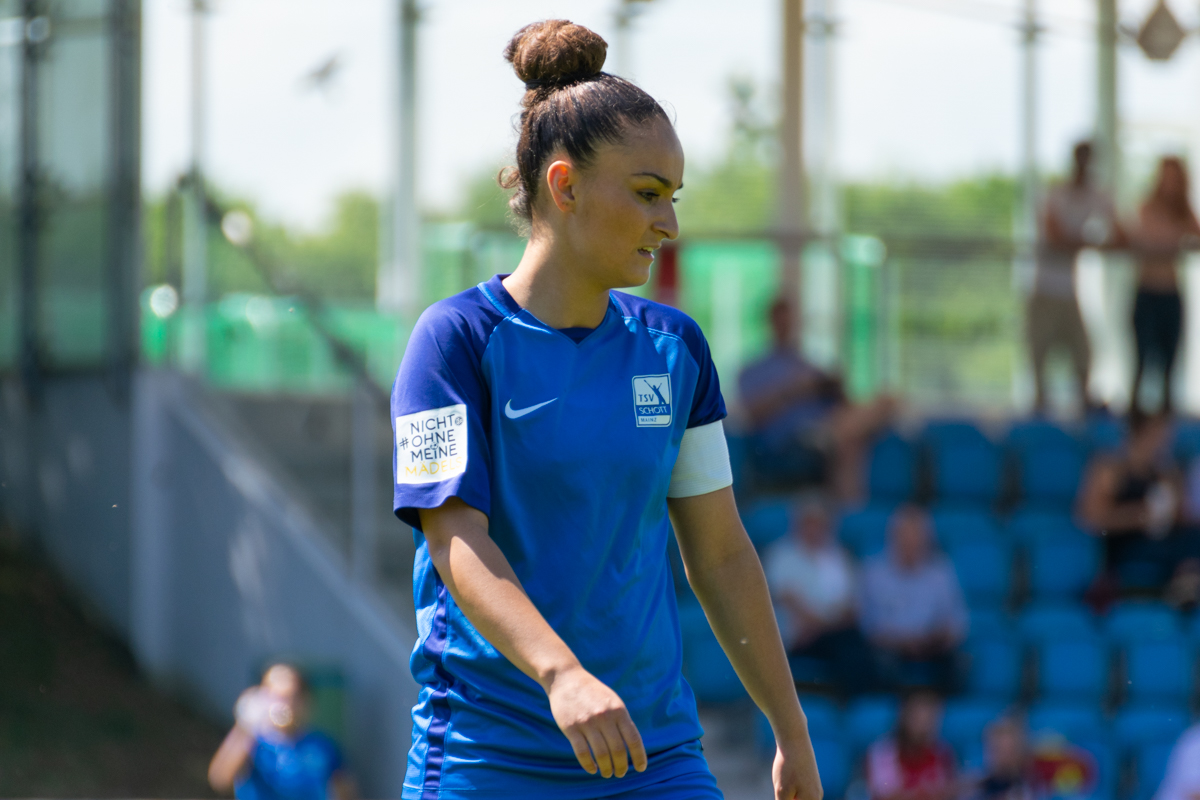
- Uzungüney in 2018

Personal information
- Date of birth: 13 May 1997 (age 29)
- Place of birth: Kassel, Germany
- Position: Defender

Team information
- Current team: 1. FSV Mainz 05
- Number: 28

Youth career
- 2012–2013: OSC Vellmar
- 2013–2014: 1. FFC Frankfurt

Senior career*
Years	Team	Apps	(Gls)
2013–2016	1. FFC Frankfurt II	22	(1)
2014	1. FFC Frankfurt III	2	(0)
2016–2019	TSV Schott Mainz	55	(13)
2019–2020	Eintracht Frankfurt	15	(2)
2020–2021	Eintracht Frankfurt III		
2021–2022	FC Ingolstadt 04		
2022–2023	TSV Schott Mainz		
2023–	1. FSV Mainz 05		

International career^{‡}
2017–2019	Turkey	14	(0)
- * Club domestic league appearances and goals as of 2 April 2017 ‡ National team caps and goals as of 8 October 2019

Ebru Uzungüney (born 13 May 1997) is a footballer who plays as a defender for 1. FSV Mainz 05. Born in Germany, she made 14 appearances for the Turkey national team.

== Club career ==
After playing in the juniors teams of OSC Vellmar in 2012–13 and of 1. FFC Frankfurt in 2013–14, Uzungüney became part of 1. FFC Frankfurt II between 2013 and 2016. In the 2015–16 season, she appeared in the top-level team of 1. FFC Frankfurt. In the 2016–17 season, she transferred to TSV Schott Mainz in the German 2nd Women's Football Bundesliga South.

She later joined Eintracht Frankfurt and FC Ingolstadt 04 before returning to TSV Schott Mainz in 2022. In 2023, TSV Schott Mainz was acquired by 1. FSV Mainz 05, and she became their captain.

== International career ==
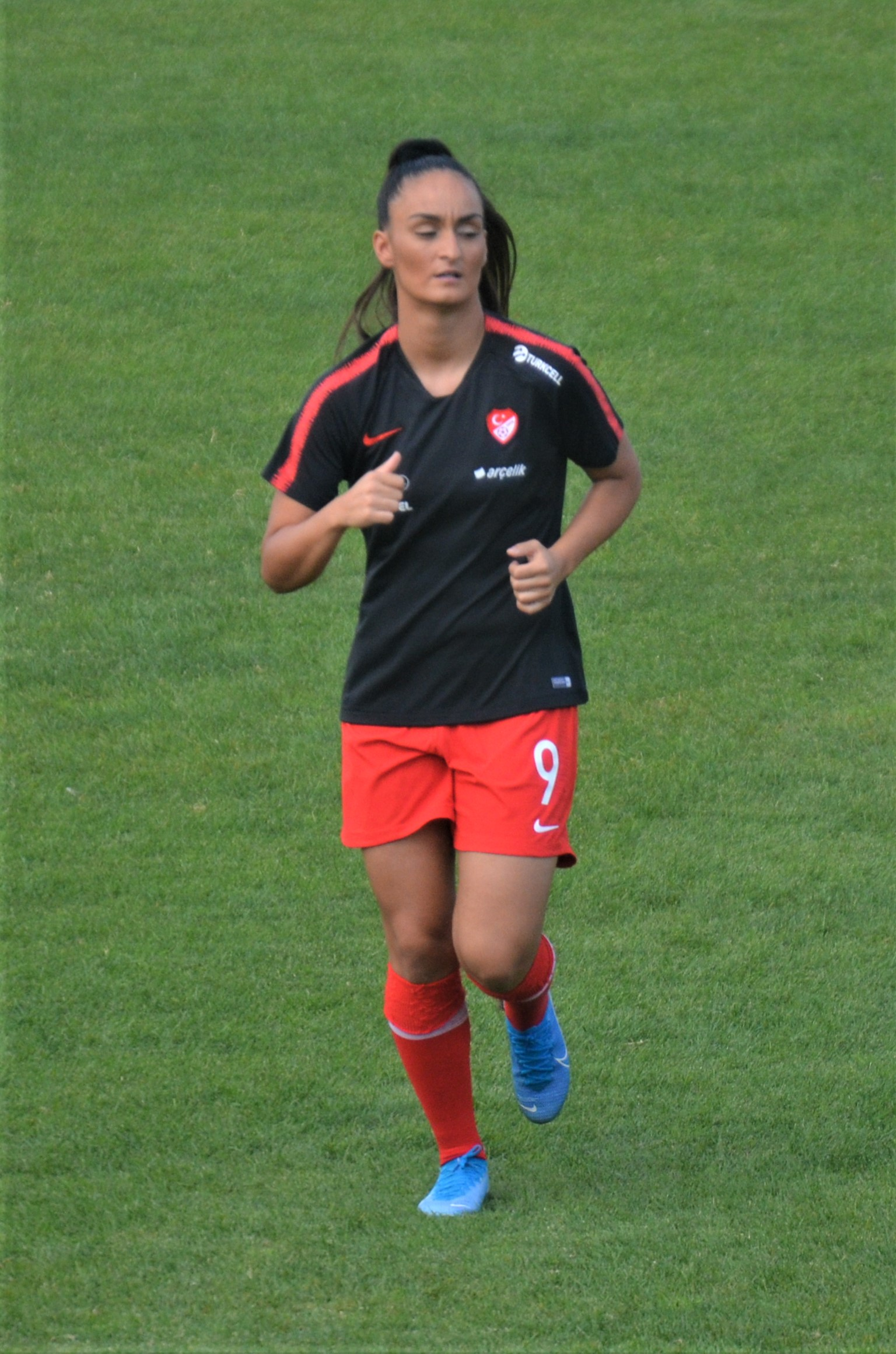
Ebru Uzungüney of Turkey national team (October 2019).

She was admitted to the Turkey women's national football team and debuted in the Goldcity Women's Cup 2017 against Romania on 1 March 2017. She played in the 2019 FIFA Women's World Cup qualification – UEFA preliminary round – Group 4 match against Montenegro.
