= 2026–27 2. Frauen-Bundesliga =

2. Frauen-Bundesliga
- Season: 2026–27
- Dates: 2 August 2026 – 9 May 2027
- Matches: 90
- Goals: 260 (2.89 per match)
- Top goalscorer: Elfie Wellhausen (8 goals)
- Biggest home win: Bochum 6–0 Andernach; Essen 6–0 Bochum
- Biggest away win: Andernach 1–6 Essen
- Highest scoring: Andernach 1–6 Essen
- Longest winning run: 5 games Bochum; Essen
- Longest unbeaten run: 6 games Essen
- Longest winless run: 10 games Köln
- Longest losing run: 6 games Köln
- Attendance: 36,697 (408 per match)
- All statistics correct as of 22 November 2026.

The 2026–27 season of the 2. Frauen-Bundesliga is the 23rd season of Germany's second-tier women's football league. It runs from 2 August 2026 to 9 May 2027.

== Teams ==
Locations of teams in the 2026–27 2. Frauen-Bundesliga

=== Team changes ===
Entering league		Exiting league	
Promoted from 2025–26 Regionalliga	Relegated from 2025–26 Bundesliga	Promoted to 2026–27 Bundesliga	Relegated to 2026–27 Regionalliga
TSG Hoffenheim II; 1. FC Köln II; Hertha BSC	SGS Essen; Carl Zeiss Jena	VfB Stuttgart; Mainz 05	Bayern Munich II; VfL Wolfsburg II; VfR Warbeyen

=== Stadiums ===
Team	Home city	Home ground	Capacity
SG Andernach	Andernach	Stadion am Bassenheimer Weg	15,220
Viktoria Berlin	Berlin	Stadion Lichterfelde	4,300
VfL Bochum	Bochum	Leichtathletikplatz am Ruhrstadion	1,500
SGS Essen	Essen	Stadion Essen	20,650
Eintracht Frankfurt II	Frankfurt	Stadion am Brentanobad	5,200
TSG Hoffenheim II	Sankt Leon-Rot	Fit und Fun Sportpark	4,000
Hertha BSC	Berlin	Stadion auf dem Wurfplatz	5,400
FC Ingolstadt	Ingolstadt	ESV-Stadion	11,481
Carl Zeiss Jena	Jena	Ernst-Abbe-Sportfeld	10,445
1. FC Köln II	Cologne	Kunstrasenplatz am Geißbockheim	
SV Meppen	Meppen	Hänsch-Arena	16,500
Borussia Mönchengladbach	Mönchengladbach	Grenzlandstadion	10,000
Turbine Potsdam	Potsdam	Karl-Liebknecht-Stadion	10,787
SC Sand	Willstätt	Kühnmatt Stadion	2,000

== League table ==
Pos	Team	Pld	W	D	L	GF	GA	GD	Pts	Qualification or relegation
1	Viktoria Berlin	13	11	0	2	25	7	+18	33	Promotion to Bundesliga
2	SGS Essen	12	9	2	1	31	8	+23	29	Promotion to Bundesliga
3	VfL Bochum	13	7	4	2	30	15	+15	25	
4	Hertha BSC	13	7	2	4	19	20	−1	23	
5	Borussia Mönchengladbach	13	7	0	6	22	20	+2	21	
6	FC Ingolstadt	13	6	2	5	21	18	+3	20	
7	SG Andernach	13	6	1	6	16	24	−8	19	
8	SV Meppen	13	4	5	4	19	15	+4	17	
9	Carl Zeiss Jena	13	5	2	6	19	17	+2	17	
10	SC Sand	13	4	3	6	13	17	−4	15	
11	Eintracht Frankfurt II (Note: Reserve teams cannot compete in the Frauen-Bundesliga and are therefore ineligible for promotion.)	13	4	1	8	7	22	−15	13	
12	TSG Hoffenheim II	13	3	2	8	22	29	−7	11	Relegation to 3. Liga
13	Turbine Potsdam	13	2	2	9	9	26	−17	8	Relegation to 3. Liga
14	1. FC Köln II	12	1	2	9	7	22	−15	5	Relegation to 3. Liga

Updated to match(es) played on 22 November 2026. Source: DFB
Rules for classification: 1) Points; 2) Goal difference; 3) Goals scored; 4) Head-to-head results; 5) Head-to-head away goals scored; 6) Away goals scored; 7) Play-off.

== Results ==
Home \ Away	AND	BER	BSC	BOC	ESS	FR2	HO2	ING	JEN	KÖ2	MEP	MÖN	POT	SAN
SG Andernach	—				1–6	0–1	2–1		2–1		1–2	1–0	1–0	
Viktoria Berlin	2–1	—	5–0	1–2	1–0			1–0			1–0		3–1	
Hertha BSC	1–1		—				3–1	2–1	0–2	2–0	2–0			
VfL Bochum	6–0		3–0	—		4–0	2–1		1–1	0–0			4–0	
SGS Essen			1–0	6–0	—	3–1		1–1			1–1	5–1		
Eintracht Frankfurt II		1–0	1–2			—		0–1	1–0	1–0		1–3		
TSG Hoffenheim II		1–3			1–4	3–0	—	4–3		1–1			4–0	2–2
FC Ingolstadt	2–1			3–3				—	2–3	3–1		0–1	1–0	2–0
Carl Zeiss Jena		0–2			1–2		4–1		—	0–1			3–1	0–1
1. FC Köln II	1–3	0–2								—	0–3	1–2	1–2	1–3
SV Meppen				1–1		5–0	2–1	1–2	2–2		—			0–0
Borussia Mönchengladbach		0–2	2–3	2–1			3–1		1–2		2–0	—		1–2
Turbine Potsdam			1–2		0–1	0–0					2–2	1–4	—	1–0
SC Sand	1–2	1–2	2–2	0–3	0–1	1–0								—

Updated to match(es) played on 22 November 2026. Source: DFB
Legend: Blue = home team win; Yellow = draw; Red = away team win.

== Statistics ==
=== Top scorers ===
As of 15 November 2026

Rank	Player	Club	Goals
1	(Germany) Elfie Wellhausen	Hertha BSC	8
2	(Germany) Laura Bröring	SV Meppen	7
2	(Germany) Kyra Spitzner	SGS Essen	7
4	(Hungary) Vanessza Nagy	SGS Essen	6
4	(Germany) Melina Reuter	Viktoria Berlin	6
4	(Germany) Carolin Schraa	SG Andernach	6
7	(Germany) Christin Meyer	Viktoria Berlin	5
7	(Germany) Pija Reininger	SC Sand	5
7	(Germany) Stefanie Reischmann	FC Ingolstadt	5
7	(Germany) Elira Terakaj	Carl Zeiss Jena	5

=== Hat-tricks ===
Player	Club	Against	Result	Date
(Netherlands) Kiki Scholten	Borussia Mönchengladbach	TSG Hoffenheim II	3–1 (H)	25 October 2026

=== Clean sheets ===
As of 15 November 2026

Rank	Player	Club	Clean sheets
1	(Germany) Anne Moll	VfL Bochum	6
1	(Germany) Melanie Wagner	Viktoria Berlin	6
3	(Germany) Anna-Lena Daum	FC Ingolstadt	4
4	(Germany) Kim-Lea Sindermann	SGS Essen	3
4	(Germany) Carla Steenken	SV Meppen	3
6	(Germany) Romy Bräutigam	TSG Hoffenheim II	2
6	(Germany) Inga Lux	Hertha BSC	2
6	(Luxembourg) Lucie Schlimé	SC Sand	2
9	(Germany) Anika Dübel	1. FC Köln II	1
9	(Switzerland) Emilie Gavillet	Turbine Potsdam	1
9	(Germany) Katharina Jeppe	Eintracht Frankfurt II	1
9	(Germany) Janne Krumme	Eintracht Frankfurt II	1
9	(Germany) Lisa Krupp	SG Andernach	1
9	(Germany) Luisa Palmen	Borussia Mönchengladbach	1
9	(Germany) Sophia Winkler	Eintracht Frankfurt II	1
