= Jenny Gaugigl =

German association football player

Personal information
- Date of birth: 22 August 1996 (age 30)
- Place of birth: Augsburg, Germany
- Height: 1.70 m (5 ft 7 in)
- Position: Defender

Team information
- Current team: FC Ingolstadt 04
- Number: 25

Youth career
- 2012–2013: FC Bayern Munich

Senior career*
Years	Team	Apps	(Gls)
2013–2016	FC Bayern Munich II		
2013–2014	FC Bayern Munich		
2016–2017	SC Sand II		
2016–2018	SC Sand		
2022–2026	SC Sand		
2026–	FC Ingolstadt 04		

International career
2014–2015	Germany U19		
2014–2016	Germany U20		
- * Club domestic league appearances and goals

Jenny Gaugigl (born 22 August 1996) is a German footballer who plays as a midfielder for FC Ingolstadt 04.

== International career ==
Gaugigl has represented Germany at youth level.

== Honours ==
Germany U20

- FIFA U-20 Women's World Cup: 2014

Bayern Munich

- Frauen-Bundesliga: 2014–15, 2015–16
