= Jil Frehse =

German footballer (born 2004)

Personal information
- Date of birth: 10 May 2004 (age 22)
- Place of birth: Erkelenz, Germany
- Height: 1.71 m (5 ft 7 in)
- Position: Goalkeeper

Team information
- Current team: Borussia Mönchengladbach
- Number: 1

Youth career
- Erkelenz
- 2015–2021: Borussia Mönchengladbach

Senior career*
Years	Team	Apps	(Gls)
2021–2022	Alemannia Aachen	18	(0)
2022–2023	Turbine Potsdam II	8	(0)
2022–2024	Turbine Potsdam	2	(0)
2023–2024	→ MSV Duisburg (loan)	1	(0)
2024–	Borussia Mönchengladbach		

International career^{‡}
2018–2019	Germany U15	4	(0)
2019	Germany U16	1	(0)
- * Club domestic league appearances and goals as of 2 September 2024 ‡ National team caps and goals as of 2 September 2024

Jil Frehse (born 10 May 2004) is a German footballer who plays as a goalkeeper for Borussia Mönchengladbach in the 2. Frauen-Bundesliga.

== Career ==
Jil Frehse started playing football in her hometown club SC 09 Erkelenz. In 2015, she joined the academy of Borussia Mönchengladbach, where she stayed until 2021. During that time, she also made appearances for the German youth teams.

In 2021, she joined Alemannia Aachen in the Regionalliga West. She made her senior debut in a 1–2 defeat against Borussia Mönchengladbach. The club was relegated at the end of the season as Jil contributed 3 clean sheets in 18 appearances.

In 2022, she joined Frauen-Bundesliga club Turbine Potsdam. She made her debut in the top division when she came on at halftime in a match against 1. FC Köln. She only played one more game for the club after that as she got more game time for the reserve team who competed in the 2. Frauen-Bundesliga. At the end of the season, Turbine Potsdam were relegated to the second division, while the B team were relegated to the Frauen-Regionalliga. On 17 August 2023, Frehse was sent on loan to Frauen-Bundesliga club MSV Duisburg until the end of the season. She only made one appearance as the team were relegated.

On 18 July 2024, she returned to Borussia Mönchengladbach who now played in the 2. Frauen-Bundesliga.
