= Linda Nyman =

Finnish footballer (born 1994)

Personal information
- Full name: Lotta Linda Maria Nyman
- Date of birth: 21 January 1994 (age 32)
- Place of birth: Kokkola, Finland
- Height: 1.70 m (5 ft 7 in)
- Position: Defender

Team information
- Current team: SC Sand
- Number: 15

Youth career
- GBK

Senior career*
Years	Team	Apps	(Gls)
2011–2013	GBK	64	(12)
2014–2018	FC Honka	105	(14)
2019	Kungsbacka DFF	21	(0)
2020–2021	Inter Milan	5	(0)
2021	Logroño	13	(1)
2021–2022	AGF	8	(0)
2022–2023	HJK	27	(0)
2024	Åland United	19	(1)
2025	HB Køge Women	9	(1)
2026	Haugesund	2	(0)
2026–	SC Sand	4	(0)

International career^{‡}
2018–	Finland	8	(0)
- * Club domestic league appearances and goals as of 9 September 2026 ‡ National team caps and goals as of 7 October 2024

Lotta Linda Maria Nyman (born 21 January 1994), known as Linda Nyman, is a Finnish footballer who plays as a defender for 2. Frauen-Bundesliga club SC Sand. and the Finland women's national team.

She previously played for Honka of the Naisten Liiga, Kungsbacka DFF of the Swedish Damallsvenskan, Inter Milan of the Italian Serie A Femminile and Toppserien club Haugesund.

== Club career ==
=== GBK ===
Nyman made her league debut against PK-35 Vantaa on 23 March 2013. She scored her first league goal against ONS Oulu on 21 September 2013, scoring in the 55th minute.

=== FC Honka ===
Nyman made her league debut against Åland United on 22 March 2014. She scored her first league goal against NiceFutis on 17 May 2014, scoring in the 56th minute.

=== Kungsbacka DFF ===
On 19 February 2019, Nyman was announced at Kungsbacka DFF. She made her league debut against Göteborg FC on 13 April 2019.

=== Inter Milan ===
In January 2020 Nyman completed a transfer from Kungsbacka DFF to Inter Milan. She joined a colony of five other Finnish players in the Italian Serie A. Nyman made her league debut against Florentia on 11 Januaryry 2020. During check-ups during the covid pandemic, it was revealed that Nyman had a defect in her heart.

=== Logroño ===
On 26 January 2021, Nyman was announced at Logroño. She made her league debut against FC Barcelona on 6 February 2021. She scored her first league goal against CD Santa Teresa on 28 February 2021, scoring in the 84th minute.

=== AGF ===
On 9 September 2021, Nyman was announced at AGF. She made her league debut against AaB on 10 September 2021.

=== HJK ===
In April 2022 she joined Helsingin Jalkapalloklubi with a contract extending till the end of 2022 season. She made her league debut against PK-35 vantaa on 8 August 2022. On 10 November 2022, Nyman signed a contract extension for the 2023 season.

=== Åland United ===
On 17 January 2024, Nyman was announced at Åland United for the 2024 season. She made her league debut against KuPS on 14 April 2024. Nyman scored her first league goal against PK-35 Helsinki on 25 May 2024, scoring in the 47th minute.

=== SC Sand ===
For the Season 2026–27, she moved to SC Sand in the 2. Frauen-Bundesliga.

== International career ==
Nyman was called up to the 2018 Cyprus Women's Cup, replacing Tia Hälinen. She made her debut for the Finland women's national team on 2 March 2018, in a 4–0 defeat by Switzerland at the 2018 Cyprus Cup.

Nyman was called up to the 2020 Cyprus Women's Cup.

== Personal life ==
Nyman was born in Kokkola.
