= Kurishima =

Kurishima (written: 栗島) is a Japanese surname. Notable people with the surname include:

- Akari Kurishima (栗島 朱里, born 1994), Japanese women's footballer
- Sumiko Kurishima (栗島 すみ子, 1902–1987), Japanese actress and dancer
