= 2016–17 Frauen-Bundesliga =

Frauen-Bundesliga
- Season: 2016–17
- Champions: VfL Wolfsburg
- Relegated: Bayer Leverkusen; Borussia Mönchengladbach
- UEFA Women's Champions League: VfL Wolfsburg; Bayern Munich
- Matches: 132
- Goals: 371 (2.81 per match)
- Top goalscorer: Mandy Islacker (19 goals)
- Biggest home win: Frankfurt 8–0; Mönchengladbach; Potsdam 8–0; Duisburg; Wolfsburg 8–0; Mönchengladbach
- Biggest away win: Leverkusen 1–8; Wolfsburg
- Highest scoring: Leverkusen 1–8; Wolfsburg

The 2016–17 season of the Frauen-Bundesliga was the 27th season of Germany's premier women's football league. Bayern Munich were the defending champions.

VfL Wolfsburg secured their third title.

== Teams ==
MSV Duisburg was promoted from the 2015–16 2. Bundesliga north and Borussia Mönchengladbach from the south.

Locations of teams in the 2016–17 Bundesliga

Team	Home city	Home ground	Capacity
MSV Duisburg	Duisburg	PCC-Stadion	3,000
SGS Essen	Essen	Stadion Essen	20,000
1. FFC Frankfurt	Frankfurt	Stadion am Brentanobad	5,500
SC Freiburg	Freiburg	Möslestadion	5,400
1899 Hoffenheim	Hoffenheim	Dietmar-Hopp-Stadion	6,350
FF USV Jena	Jena	Ernst-Abbe-Sportfeld	10,800
Bayer 04 Leverkusen	Leverkusen	Jugendleistungszentrum Kurtekotten	1,140
Borussia Mönchengladbach	Mönchengladbach	Grenzlandstadion	10,000
FC Bayern Munich	Munich	Grünwalder Stadion	12,500
1. FFC Turbine Potsdam	Potsdam	Karl-Liebknecht-Stadion	10,786
SC Sand	Willstätt	Kühnmatt Stadion	2,000
VfL Wolfsburg	Wolfsburg	AOK Stadium	5,200

== League table ==
Pos	Team	Pld	W	D	L	GF	GA	GD	Pts	Qualification or relegation
1	VfL Wolfsburg (C)	22	17	3	2	56	14	+42	54	Qualification for Champions League
2	Bayern Munich	22	17	1	4	36	15	+21	52	Qualification for Champions League
3	Turbine Potsdam	22	16	2	4	42	16	+26	50	
4	SC Freiburg	22	13	6	3	45	20	+25	45	
5	1. FFC Frankfurt	22	10	7	5	40	28	+12	37	
6	SGS Essen	22	9	5	8	38	30	+8	32	
7	1899 Hoffenheim	22	9	3	10	23	23	0	30	
8	SC Sand	22	8	4	10	29	23	+6	28	
9	FF USV Jena	22	5	2	15	19	34	−15	17	
10	MSV Duisburg	22	4	4	14	19	49	−30	16	
11	Bayer Leverkusen (R)	22	2	3	17	16	53	−37	9	Relegation to 2. Bundesliga
12	Borussia Mönchengladbach (R)	22	2	0	20	8	66	−58	6	Relegation to 2. Bundesliga

Source: DFB
Rules for classification: 1) Points; 2) Goal difference; 3) Goals scored
(C) Champions; (R) Relegated

== Results ==
Home \ Away	DUI	ESS	FRA	FRE	HOF	JEN	LEV	MÖN	MUN	POT	SAN	WOL
MSV Duisburg		0–3	1–2	3–3	1–0	3–1	0–1	2–1	0–1	1–2	3–3	0–3
SGS Essen	1–1		0–3	1–0	1–0	1–4	7–1	3–0	0–3	1–1	1–1	0–2
FFC Frankfurt	1–0	2–2		1–1	1–3	2–1	4–2	8–0	4–2	1–1	3–1	1–5
SC Freiburg	5–0	4–2	0–0		0–0	2–1	2–1	4–0	2–3	2–1	2–1	2–0
1899 Hoffenheim	1–0	1–1	2–2	1–2		1–0	3–1	3–0	0–1	0–3	1–0	1–2
FF Jena	1–0	0–4	0–1	0–2	0–1		1–1	1–0	0–1	0–2	0–3	1–2
Bayer Leverkusen	0–0	1–5	2–2	1–3	0–1	0–2		2–1	0–1	1–2	0–3	1–8
Borussia Mönchengladbach	1–3	0–3	0–2	0–4	0–4	0–3	2–1		0–3	1–3	0–1	1–2
Bayern Munich	3–1	2–0	1–0	1–1	1–0	2–1	1–0	1–0		1–2	1–0	1–2
Turbine Potsdam	8–0	2–0	3–0	0–1	1–0	1–0	1–0	5–0	0–4		1–0	1–3
SC Sand	6–0	0–1	2–2	1–3	1–0	3–0	2–0	0–1	0–1	0–1		0–0
Wolfsburg	2–0	2–1	0–0	1–0	4–0	2–2	2–0	8–0	2–0	0–1	4–1	

Updated to match(es) played on 21 May 2017. Source: DFB
Legend: Blue = home team win; Yellow = draw; Red = away team win.

== Topscorers ==
Rank	Player	Team	Goals
1	(Germany) Mandy Islacker	1. FFC Frankfurt	19
2	(Netherlands) Vivianne Miedema	Bayern Munich	14
3	(Germany) Hasret Kayikçi	SC Freiburg	12
4	(Germany) Lina Magull	SC Freiburg	11
5	(Germany) Tabea Kemme	Turbine Potsdam	10
6	(Germany) Alexandra Popp	VfL Wolfsburg	8
6	(Germany) Lea Schüller	SGS Essen	8
8	(Austria) Nina Burger	SC Sand	7
8	(Germany) Svenja Huth	Turbine Potsdam	7
8	(Germany) Felicitas Rauch	Turbine Potsdam	7

=== Hat-tricks ===
Player	For	Against	Result	Date	Ref.
(Germany) Mandy Islacker	1. FFC Frankfurt	Borussia Mönchengladbach	8–0	4 September 2016	
(Germany) Lena Petermann	SC Freiburg	MSV Duisburg	5–0	11 September 2016	
(Germany) Mandy Islacker	1. FFC Frankfurt	SGS Essen	3–0	19 March 2017	
(Germany) Lina Magull	SC Freiburg	SGS Essen	4–2	30 April 2017	
(Denmark) Pernille Harder	VfL Wolfsburg	Borussia Mönchengladbach	8–0	30 April 2017	
(Germany) Lea Schüller	SGS Essen	Bayer Leverkusen	7–1	14 May 2017	
