= Chiara Bouziane =

German footballer (born 1997)

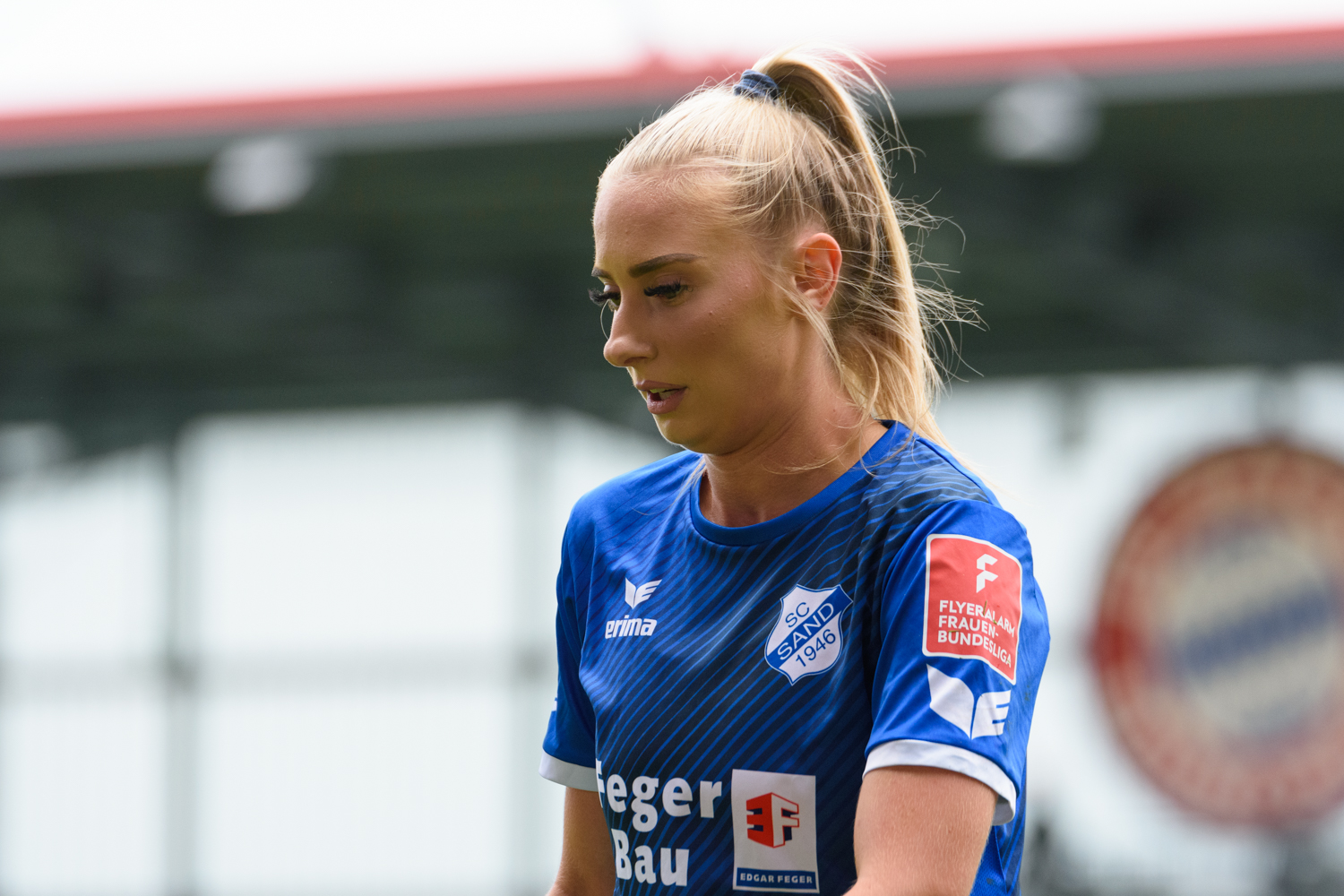
- Bouziane in 2020 with SC Sand

Personal information
- Birth name: Chiara Loos
- Date of birth: 10 January 1997 (age 29)
- Place of birth: Mainz, Germany
- Height: 1.68 m (5 ft 6 in)
- Position: Right midfielder

Team information
- Current team: Mainz 05
- Number: 10

Youth career
- 1. FC Nackenheim
- 2010: Fontana Finthen
- 2011: Hassia Bingen
- 2011–2012: SV Gonsenheim

Senior career*
Years	Team	Apps	(Gls)
2012–2018	TSV Schott Mainz	88	(42)
2018–2020	1. FC Saarbrücken	39	(14)
2019–2020	1. FC Saarbrücken II		
2020–2022	SC Sand	38	(7)
2022–2024	SC Freiburg	17	(2)
2024–	Mainz 05	45	(23)

International career
2011–2012	Germany U15	5	(4)
2012–2013	Germany U16	7	(1)
2014–2015	Germany U19	7	(1)
2015	Germany U20	1	(0)
- * Club domestic league appearances and goals as of 22 November 2026

Chiara Bouziane (née Loos; born 10 January 1997) is a German footballer who plays as a right midfielder for Frauen-Bundesliga club Mainz 05. She previously played for SC Sand (2020–2022) and SC Freiburg ((2022–2024)) in the Frauen-Bundesliga and for 1. FC Saarbrücken in the 2. Frauen-Bundesliga (2018–2020).

== Early life and youth career ==
Bouziane started playing football at the age of 5, encouraged by her brother. She also practised ballet dancing which she later quit. Her first club was 1. FC Nackenheim where she was the only girl in the team. She later joined Fontana Finthen playing there until C youth before moving to Hassia Bingen and SV Gonsenheim. At SV Gonsenheim she played with the C1 youth boys team while training with Frauen-Bundesliga side 1. FFC Frankfurt once a month.

== Club career ==
Bouziane scored five goals and made six assists for SC Sand in the 2020–21 season helping her club escape relegation from the Frauen-Bundesliga.

In May 2022 it was announced Bouziane would sign with Frauen-Bundesliga club SC Freiburg from league rivals SC Sand who were close to relegation with two matches left.On 26 July 2024, the then-Frauen-Regionalliga club 1. FSV Mainz 05 announced his signing.

== International career ==
Bouziane represented Germany internationally at various youth levels. In 2011 she made her debut for the Germany U15 national team.

== Style of play ==
A right midfielder, Bouziane is known for her speed. During her time at SC Sand, football magazine Elfen described her as "one of the most exciting players in German women's football".

== Personal life ==
Bouziane has a brother, Norman, who also plays football, notably for TSV Schott Mainz in the Verbandsliga.

In summer 2022 she married French footballer Mounir Bouziane.
