= Vildan Kardeşler =

Turkish-German footballer (born 1998)

Personal information
- Date of birth: 24 February 1998 (age 28)
- Place of birth: Steinfurt, Germany
- Height: 1.70 m (5 ft 7 in)
- Position: Forward

Team information
- Current team: SC Sand
- Number: 27

Youth career
- 2008–2016: SV Burgsteinfurt
- 2016–2017: SV Meppen II

College career
Years	Team	Apps	(Gls)
2017–2019	Pittsburgh Panthers	34	(5)
2020–2021	Arizona State Sun Devils	6	(1)

Senior career*
Years	Team	Apps	(Gls)
2022	Bayer 04 Leverkusen II	2	(0)
2022–2024	SV Meppen	37	(8)
2024–2026	Hamburger SV	28	(4)
2026–	SC Sand	9	(0)

International career^{‡}
2013–2014	Germany U-16	5	(0)
2014–2015	Germany U-17	12	(2)
2026–	Turkey	4	(0)
- * Club domestic league appearances and goals as of 22 November 2026 ‡ National team caps and goals as of 18 April 2026

Vildan Kardeşler (Turkish: [vilˈdan kaɾˈdeʃleɾ]; born 24 February 1998) is a professional footballer who plays as a forward for 2. Frauen-Bundesliga club SC Sand. Born in Germany and a former Germany youth international, she plays for the Turkey national team.

== Early years ==
=== Youth teams in Germany ===
Kardeşler started her football career playing for the Kreisliga-team, the lowest-level local district league club, SV Burgsteinfurt in her hometown in 2008. As a player and captain in the U18 selection team of the state organization Westphalian Football and Athletics Association, she appeared in four games, and won the DFB State Cup Youth at the Wedau Sports School in Duisburg.

In January 2016, not yet 18 years old, she transferred to SV Meppen II. She played in eight matches of the two-tier Second Bundesliga Nord. She made her senior debut on 14 February 2016 in her team's 12th league game against MSV Duisburg as a substitute in the 68th minute. She was in the starting lineup for the first time in the match against VfL Wolfsburg on 28 March, and scored her first goal on 8 May 2016 in the 21st league game against BV Cloppenburg. Due to a persistent groin injury, she suffered on 21 August 2016 in the First round of the 2016–17 DFB Cup against FSV Gütersloh 2009, she played seven league games only in the second half of the following season, and failed to score any.

=== College teams in the United States ===
During her education at the University of Pittsburgh, United States, she played for the college soccer team Pittsburgh Panthers between 2017 and 2019. As a freshman, she appeared in 18 championship games of the 2017 Atlantic Coast Conference season, and scored two goals. As a sophomore, she stayed away from the football field in the 2018 season due to an injury. As a redshirt, she scored three goals in 16 championship games in the 2019 season.

In July 2020, she joined the Arizona State Sun Devils, when she continued her studies at Arizona State University. As a junior class player, she scored one goal in six games of the 2020 NCAA Women's Soccer Championship season, which was postponed to spring 2021 due to COVID-19 pandemic in the US. As a senior class players, she appeared again in three games in the fall of the 2021 season.

== Club career ==
Kardeşler is 1.70 m (5 ft 7 in) tall, at 59 kg (130 lb). She plays in the forward position as a right winger.

=== Bayer 04 Leverkusen ===
After completing her studies in the United States, she returned to Germany and was signed by Bayer 04 Leverkusen for the remaining second half of the 2021–22 Bundesliga season. She was in the Bundesliga team's squad for two matches, but was not used further, and played two games for the second team in the third-tier Regionalliga West.

=== SV Meppen ===
In August 2022, she returned to her former club SV Meppen in Emsland for the 2022–23 Bundesliga season . She scored one goal in eleven league games, and appeared in two cup games. At the end of the season she and her team were relegated to the Second Bundesliga Nord.

=== Hamburger SV ===
In June 2024, it was announced that she signed a two-year contract with Hamburger SV. Her team finished the 2024–25 Second Bundesliga season in third place, and was promoted to the Bundeslia, as well as reached the semifinals of the 2024–25 DFB Cup. She scored six goals in 26 games across all competitions.

=== SC Sand ===
For the Season 2026–27, she moved to SC Sand in the 2. Frauen-Bundesliga.

== International career ==
=== Germany youth teams ===
Kardeşler was part of the Germany national U-16 team. On 3 September 2013, she made her debut in the friendly match against Norway U-16 in Jessheim, Norway. One year later, she played three matches at the Women's Nordic Cup U16, and contributed to the eventual title victory.

She made her debut in the Germany U-17 team playing in the friendly game against France U-16 in Enzesfeld-Lindabrunn, Austria on 1 September 2014. She appeared in four more friendly matches in 2015. At the Elite and Final rounds of the 2015 UEFA Women's U17 Championship qualification, she appeared as team captain in six games in total.

She was also part of the Germany U-19 team team.

=== Turkey senior team ===
In February 2026, she was admitted to the Turkey national team for the 2027 FIFA Women's World Cup qualification – UEFA League B matches. She debuted on 14 April 2026 in the game against Switzerland, replacing Kader Hançar in the 89th minute.

== Persınal life ==
Vildan Kardeşler was born to Turkish immigrant parents, Mehmet and Yasemin Kardeşler, in Burgsteinfurt town of Steinfurt, North Rhine-Westphalia in Germany on 24 February 1998. She has one younger brother, Samet.

After successfully graduating from the high school Gymnasium Arnoldinum in her hometown with Abitur at the age of 17, she set out to study psychology as a major in the United States. She enrolled in the University of Pittsburgh in July 2017, where she studied until 2019. In 2020, she moved to Arizona State University in Phoenix for completing her studies until 2021.
