= Yurina Imai =

Japanese footballer (born 1998)

Personal information
- Date of birth: 20 February 1998 (age 28)
- Place of birth: Tokyo Prefecture, Japan
- Height: 1.60 m (5 ft 3 in)
- Position: Midfielder

Team information
- Current team: 1. FSV Mainz 05
- Number: 14

Youth career
- –2016: Urawa Red Diamonds

Senior career*
Years	Team	Apps	(Gls)
2016–2020	Nittaidai SMG Yokohama	22	(2)
2020–2023	JEF United Chiba	37	(1)
2023–	1. FSV Mainz 05	64	(6)
- * Club domestic league appearances and goals as of 22 November 2026

Yurina Imai (born 20 February 1998) is a Japanese professional footballer who plays as a midfielder for German club 1. FSV Mainz 05.

== Career ==
Imai made her WE League debut for JEF United Chiba on 20 September 2021. In 2023, she joined German side 1. FSV Mainz 05.
