= Suguri Hashitani =

Japanese footballer (born 1997)

Personal information
- Date of birth: 15 November 1997 (age 29)
- Place of birth: Miyazaki Prefecture, Japan
- Height: 1.64 m (5 ft 5 in)
- Position: Defender

Team information
- Current team: 1. FSV Mainz 05
- Number: 25

Senior career*
Years	Team	Apps	(Gls)
2018–2021	Nittaidai SMG Yokohama	24	(1)
2021–2026	AC Nagano Parceiro	19	(0)
2026–	1. FSV Mainz 05	16	(1)
- * Club domestic league appearances and goals as of 22 November 2026

Suguri Hashitani (born 15 November 1997) is a Japanese professional footballer who plays as a defender for Frauen-Bundesliga club 1. FSV Mainz 05.

== Club career ==
Hashitani made her WE League debut on 18 September 2021.
