= Mamiko Matsumoto =

Japanese footballer

Personal information
- Date of birth: 9 October 1997 (age 29)
- Place of birth: Chiba Prefecture, Japan
- Height: 1.68 m (5 ft 6 in)
- Position: Goalkeeper

Team information
- Current team: Mainz 05
- Number: 1

Senior career*
Years	Team	Apps	(Gls)
2016–2019	Urawa Red Diamonds Ladies	9	(0)
2020–2024	MyNavi Sendai	64	(0)
2024–	Mainz 05	49	(0)

International career
2013–2014	Japan U-17	5	(0)
2015–2016	Japan U-20	1	(0)
- * Club domestic league appearances and goals as of 19 September 2026

Mamiko Matsumoto (born 9 October 1997) is a Japanese professional footballer who plays as a goalkeeper for Frauen-Bundesliga club Mainz 05.

== Club career ==
Matsumoto made her WE League debut on 12 September 2021.
