= Akari Kurishima =

Japanese footballer

Personal information
- Full name: Akari Kurishima
- Date of birth: 14 September 1994 (age 32)
- Place of birth: Sayama, Saitama, Japan
- Height: 1.57 m (5 ft 2 in)
- Position: Midfielder

Team information
- Current team: 1. FSV Mainz 05
- Number: 6

Youth career
- Urawa Reds

Senior career*
Years	Team	Apps	(Gls)
2011–2025	Urawa Reds	102	(2)
2025–	1. FSV Mainz 05	34	(1)

International career^{‡}
2013	Japan U19	1	(1)
2019	Japan	1	(0)
- * Club domestic league appearances and goals as of 22 November 2026 ‡ National team caps and goals as of 17 December 2019.

Akari Kurishima (栗島 朱里, Kurishima Akari; born 14 September 1994) is a Japanese footballer who plays as a midfielder for 1. FSV Mainz 05 and the Japan women's national team.

== Career statistics ==
=== International ===
Appearances and goals by national team and year
National Team	Year	Apps	Goals
Japan
Japan	2019	1	0
Total		1	0
