= SV Elversberg (women) =

- Founded: 2018; 8 years ago
- Ground: Kunstrasenplatz, Göttelborn
- Manager: Gaspare Alaimo
- League: Regionalliga Südwest
- 2024–25: 4th
Home colours	Away colours	Third colours

SV Elversberg is a women's association football club from Elversberg, Germany. It is part of the SV Elversberg club.

== History ==
The origins of the team trace back to SV Göttelborn, which operated a women's team from 1985 and re-established it in the 2014–15 season. In 2018, SV Göttelborn entered into a partnership with SV Elversberg, as competing at a higher level was not feasible for Göttelborn alone. Due to regulations from the Saarland Football Association, the team initially competed under the name SV Göttelborn in the Verbandsliga (4th division), as it was not permitted to play as SV Elversberg.

Following two promotions, the team reached the 2021–22 2. Frauen-Bundesliga and has since competed under the name SV Elversberg. However, in 2022, they were relegated back to the Regionalliga Südwest.

== Squad ==
As of 21 May 2025

Note: Flags indicate national team as defined under FIFA eligibility rules; some limited exceptions apply. Players may hold more than one non-FIFA nationality.

No.	Pos.	Nation	Player
1	GK	GER	Nadine Winckler
2	DF	CAN	Jenna Croteau
5	DF	GER	Emilia Wittling
6	MF	GER	Lara Martin (captain)
7	MF	GER	Lena Josten
8	MF	GER	Melina Goyn
9	FW	GER	Anna Wagner
10	FW	GER	Claudia Pilger
11	MF	GER	Lena Reiter
14	MF	GER	Lilli Berwind
15	DF	GER	Paula Cochlovius Quintanero
16	MF	LUX	Leila Schmit

No.	Pos.	Nation	Player
19	DF	GER	Lea Grünnagel
22	MF	GER	Emma Junold
24	MF	GER	Emily Klein
27	FW	GER	Alissa Andres
28	MF	GER	Mira Anderson
31	GK	GER	Amanda Sandmann
33	FW	GER	Ronja Frank
34	GK	GER	Hannah Schillo

== Current staff ==
As of 21 May 2025

Coaching staff
(Italy) Gaspare Alaimo	Head coach
(Germany) Christian Walther	Assistant coach
(Germany) Michelle Müller	Goalkeeping coach
(Germany) Dennis Bamberg	Goalkeeping coach
(Germany) Jonas Baumgarten	Physiotherapist
(Germany) Jan Doht	Physiotherapist
(Germany) Jesper Morsch	Physiotherapist
