= Vital Kats =

Israeli footballer

Personal information
- Full name: Vital Zina Kats
- Date of birth: 18 November 1999 (age 27)
- Place of birth: Netanya, Israel
- Height: 1.63 m (5 ft 4 in)
- Position: Midfielder

Team information
- Current team: 1. FSV Mainz 05
- Number: 30

Youth career
- El Salvador SC
- Unionville Milliken SC
- Scarborough GS United

College career
Years	Team	Apps	(Gls)
2017–2021	Kent State Golden Flashes	58	(22)

Senior career*
Years	Team	Apps	(Gls)
2015	ProStars FC		(3)
2016	Aurora United FC	2	(2)
2018–2019	DeRo United FC	10	(2)
2021–2022	Glasgow City	7	(4)
2022–2023	Braga	6	(1)
2023	→ Braga B	1	(0)
2023–2024	Kiryat Gat	12	(4)
2024–	1. FSV Mainz 05	46	(42)

International career^{‡}
2016	Canada U17	8	(2)
2015–2016	Canada U20	4	(1)
2020–	Israel	20	(8)
- * Club domestic league appearances and goals as of 22 November 2026 ‡ National team caps and goals as of 15 October 2026

Vital Zina Kats (Hebrew: ויטל זינה כץ; born 18 November 1999) is an Israeli footballer who plays as a midfielder for German club 1. FSV Mainz 05 in the 2. Frauen-Bundesliga and the Israel women's national team.

== Early life ==
Born in Israel, Kats moved to Toronto, Canada at the age of seven. She began playing soccer at the age of 9 with El Salvador SC in Toronto, before later playing with Unionville Milliken SC and Scarborough GS United. With GS United, she won the 2016 Ontario Cup as women's provincial amateur champions.

== College career ==
In 2017, she began attending Kent State University, where she played for the women's soccer team. She scored a goal in her debut on August 20, 2017, against the Cleveland State Vikings. As a freshman in 2017, Kats led all MAC freshmen in scoring with six goals and four assists, also leading the team in scoring. She was named the MAC Freshman of The Year, and was named to the All-MAC Second Team, MAC All-Freshman Team, First Team All-Ohio, and USC All-Midwest Region Second Team.

In 2018, she once again led the team in scoring and was named to the USC All-Midwest Region First Team, All-MAC First Team, CoSIDA Academic All-District Second Team, OCSA All-Ohio First Team, and was a MAC Distinguished Scholar-Athlete and Academic All-MAC. In 2019, she was named to the USC All-Midwest Region Third Team, All-MAC First Team, CoSIDA Academic All-District Second Team, OCSA All-Ohio First Team, and was a MAC Distinguished Scholar-Athlete and Academic All-MAC. During the Spring 2021 season (delayed from the 2020 Fall), she was named an All-MAC Second Team, CoSIDA Academic All-District First Team, MAC Distinguished Scholar-Athlete, and Academic All-MAC.

== Club career ==
In 2015, she briefly played with ProStars FC in League1 Ontario, with whom she scored 3 goals.

In 2016, she played with Aurora United FC in League1 Ontario, making two appearances. She scored two goals in her debut on August 13 against Durham United FA. She was a finalist for the Goal of the Year award.

In 2018 and 2019, she played with DeRo United FC. She scored her first goal for DeRo United in a League Cup victory on June 24 against North Mississauga SC. She scored her first league goal on July 8 against Toronto Azzurri Blizzard.

In August 2021, Kats signed her first professional contract with Scottish Women's Premier League side Glasgow City F.C. She scored her first goal for the club on August 18, 2021, during a 2021–22 UEFA Women's Champions League qualifying match against Maltese club Birkirkara. She departed the club after the season.

In July 2022, she joined Portuguese club S.C. Braga in the Campeonato Nacional Feminino. She made her debut for Braga in the Supertaça de Portugal semi-finals against Benfica on 10 August, coming on as a substitute.

In 2023, she joined Kiryat Gat in the Israeli Ligat Nashim.

In September 2024, she joined 1. FSV Mainz 05 in the German third tier Frauen-Regionalliga on a one-year contract. On 17 November, she scored four goals in a 13–0 victory over SV Dirmingen. In July 2025, after helping the side earn promotion to the second tier 2. Frauen-Bundesliga, she extended her contract for an additional season.

== International career ==
In 2014, Kats attended a training camp with the Canada U15 team for her Canadian youth program debut. In December 2015, she won a silver medal with the Canada U20 at the 2015 CONCACAF Women's U-20 Championship, where she scored in her debut in a 7–0 victory over Jamaica U20 on December 6. In 2016, she played with the Canada U17 at the 2016 CONCACAF Women's U-17 Championship, where they finished third, and the 2016 FIFA U-17 Women's World Cup, and also played in the 2016 FIFA U-20 Women's World Cup.

She made her senior debut for Israel on 21 October 2020 during the UEFA Women's Euro 2022 qualifying.

== Personal life ==
Kats' parents were born in Minsk, Soviet Union (now Belarus) and, being Jewish, made aliyah to Israel, where she was born.

== Career statistics ==
No.	Date	Venue	Opponent	Score	Result	Competition
1.	26 September 2023	Tamme Stadium, Tartu, Estonia	Estonia	4–0	5–0	2023–24 UEFA Women's Nations League
2.	9 April 2024	Ménfői úti Stadion, Győr, Hungary	Serbia	1–1	2–4	UEFA Women's Euro 2025 qualifying
3.	14 April 2026	BSC Stadium, Budaörs, Hungary	Luxembourg	1–0	6–0	2027 FIFA Women's World Cup qualification
4.	14 April 2026	BSC Stadium, Budaörs, Hungary	Luxembourg	5–0	6–0	2027 FIFA Women's World Cup qualification
5.	14 April 2026	BSC Stadium, Budaörs, Hungary	Luxembourg	6–0	6–0	2027 FIFA Women's World Cup qualification
6.	18 April 2026	BSC Stadium, Budaörs, Hungary	Luxembourg	1–1	3–1	2027 FIFA Women's World Cup qualification
7.	18 April 2026	BSC Stadium, Budaörs, Hungary	Luxembourg	2–1	3–1	2027 FIFA Women's World Cup qualification
8.	9 June 2026	Bozsik Aréna, Budapest, Hungary	Scotland	1–2	1–5	2027 FIFA Women's World Cup qualification
