= 1. FSV Mainz 05 (women) =

- Full name: 1. Fußball- und Sport-Verein Mainz 05 e.V.
- Founded: 2022; 4 years ago
- Ground: Bruchwegstadion
- Capacity: 7,134
- Manager: Marcel Kostadinov / Sho Chikaraishi (interim)
- League: 2. Frauen-Bundesliga
- 2025–26: 2. Bundesliga, 2nd of 14 (promoted)
Home colours	Away colours	Third colours

1. FSV Mainz 05 is a women's association football club from Mainz, Germany. It is part of the 1. FSV Mainz 05 club.

== History ==
In 2022, FSV Mainz 05 and TSV Schott Mainz agreed to collaborate on developing girls' and women's football. This partnership saw TSV Schott Mainz fully integrated into the Mainz 05 framework starting from the 2023–24 season. In their inaugural season, the club secured first place in the Regionalliga Südwest but fell to VfL Bochum with a 6–3 aggregate score in the 2. Bundesliga promotion play-off final.

The club initially utilized TSV Schott Mainz' facilities, before moving to the Bruchwegstadion ahead of the 2024–25 season. On 18 May 2025, Mainz secured promotion to the 2. Bundesliga after winning the 2024–25 Frauen-Regionalliga Südwest, having won all but two matches. The team shone offensively, with Nadine Anstatt becoming the league's top scorer with 33 goals.

On 17 May 2026, the club secured promotion to the Bundesliga as runners-up after a 5–0 victory over FC Ingolstadt on the final matchday.

== Squad ==
As of 14 November 2026

Note: Flags indicate national team as defined under FIFA eligibility rules; some limited exceptions apply. Players may hold more than one non-FIFA nationality.

No.	Pos.	Nation	Player
1	GK	JPN	Mamiko Matsumoto
3	DF	AUT	Marina Georgieva
4	DF	GER	Kara Bathmann
6	MF	JPN	Akari Kurishima
7	MF	KOS	Gentiana Fetaj
8	MF	JPN	Rio Takizawa
9	FW	GER	Johanna Berg (captain)
10	MF	GER	Chiara Bouziane
11	DF	GER	Nicola Hauk
12	GK	GER	Laura Pawlowski
14	MF	JPN	Yurina Imai
13	FW	CAN	Mattson Strickler
15	DF	GER	Anna Lotte Donner
16	MF	GER	Christine Kilian

No.	Pos.	Nation	Player
18	DF	GER	Paula Flach
19	MF	GER	Saskia Matheis
20	MF	SUI	Sabina Jackson
22	MF	GER	Emma Junold
23	MF	CRO	Ivana Slipčević
24	FW	GER	Mara Bukowski
25	DF	JPN	Suguri Hashitani
26	MF	GER	Lara Martin
27	FW	GER	Nadine Anstatt
30	MF	ISR	Vital Kats
31	DF	GER	Leonie Stöhr
33	GK	GER	Marisa Schön
37	DF	GER	Maja Pageler

== Former players ==
- (Portugal) Dominique Pombeiro
- (Italy) Lorena Graci
- (France) Josephine Le Gall
- (United States) Katherine Whitman

== Current staff ==
As of 23 June 2024

Coaching staff
vacant	Head coach
(Japan) Yuya Okuda (Germany) Alexander Ulbrich (Germany) Elvir Smajlovic	Assistant coach
(Germany) Daniel Grieb	Athletic trainer
Managerial staff
(Germany) Nadine Kress	Sports Director
Medical department
(Germany) Luisa Gebhard (Germany) Alexander Santa (Germany) Samuel Paul	Physiotherapist
