= Nadine Anstatt =

German footballer (born 1995)

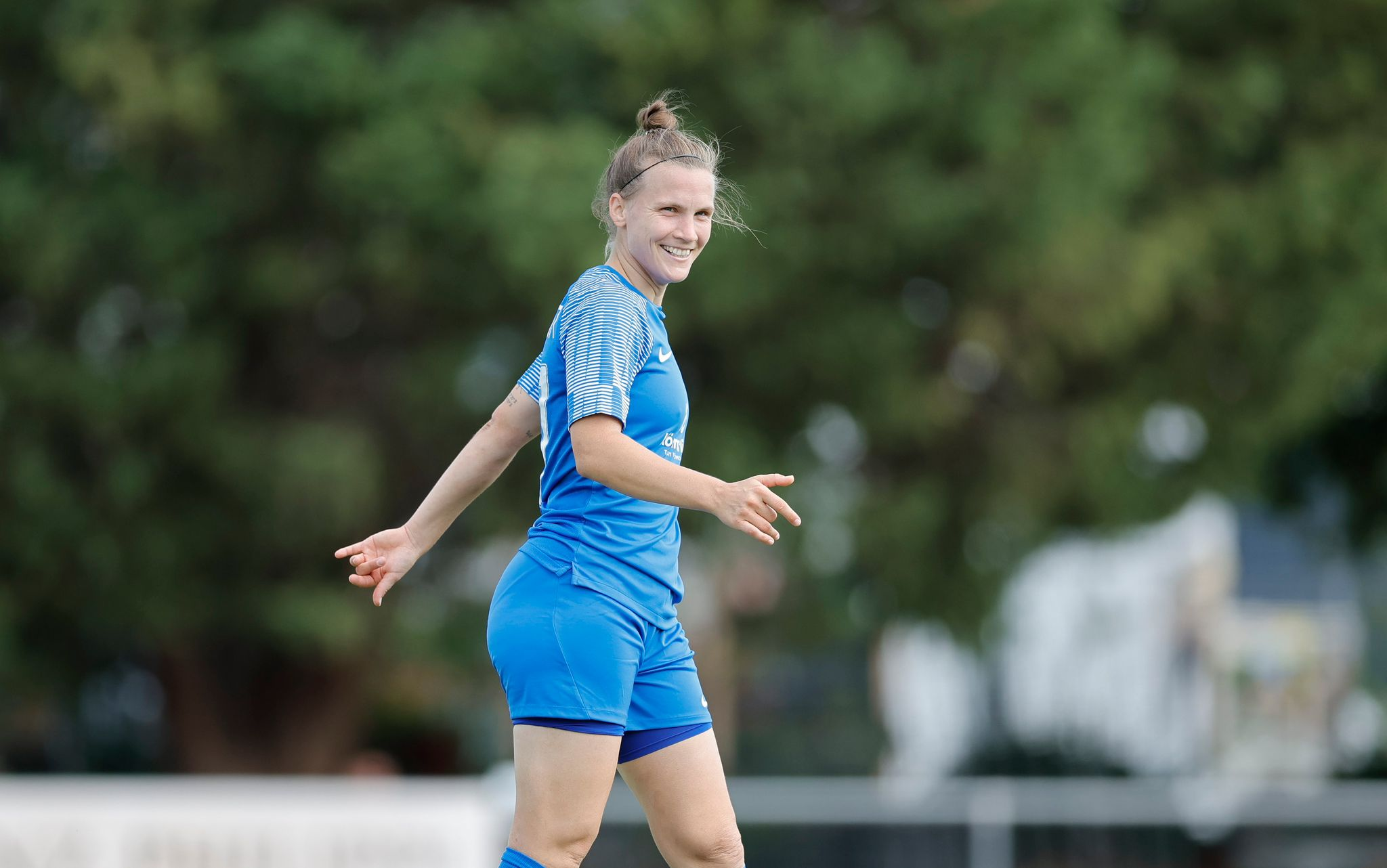
- Anstatt in 2022

Personal information
- Date of birth: 14 May 1995 (age 31)
- Place of birth: Mainz, Germany
- Height: 1.71 m (5 ft 7 in)
- Position: Midfielder

Team information
- Current team: 1. FSV Mainz 05
- Number: 27

Youth career
- TSG Drais
- FSV Alemannia Laubenheim

Senior career*
Years	Team	Apps	(Gls)
2011–2013	TuS Wörrstadt	26	(16)
2013–2014	TSV Schott Mainz	18	(19)
2014–2018	1. FFC Frankfurt II	52	(28)
2016–2018	1. FFC Frankfurt	9	(1)
2018–2019	FSV Hessen Wetzlar	26	(9)
2019–2020	BV Cloppenburg	11	(4)
2020–2022	1. FC Saarbrücken	30	(22)
2022–2023	TSV Schott Mainz	19	(24)
2023–	1. FSV Mainz 05	74	(66)
- * Club domestic league appearances and goals as of 22 November 2026

Nadine Anstatt (born 14 May 1995) is a German footballer who plays as a midfielder for 1. FSV Mainz 05.
