= 2026–27 Frauen-Regionalliga =

Frauen-Regionalliga
- Season: 2026–27

The 2026–27 season of the Frauen-Regionalliga is the 23rd season of Germany's third-tier women's football league.

== Regionalliga Nord ==
Pos	Team	Pld	W	D	L	GF	GA	GD	Pts	Qualification or relegation
1	Holstein Kiel	6	6	0	0	20	5	+15	18	Qualification for Promotion Play-Offs for the 2. Bundesliga
2	Hamburger SV II	6	4	2	0	25	3	+22	14	
3	Hannover 96	6	4	2	0	24	8	+16	14	
4	SV Henstedt-Ulzburg	6	4	2	0	22	7	+15	14	
5	Werder Bremen II	6	4	1	1	22	9	+13	13	
6	SpVg Aurich	6	3	1	2	17	8	+9	10	
7	SV TiMoNo	7	3	1	3	5	11	−6	10	
8	VfL Wolfsburg II	6	2	2	2	12	12	0	8	
9	ATS Buntentor	6	2	0	4	9	23	−14	6	
10	FC St. Pauli	6	0	4	2	6	9	−3	4	
11	Eimsbütteler TV	6	1	1	4	7	15	−8	4	
12	Walddörfer SV	6	0	3	3	4	13	−9	3	
13	SSC Hagen Ahrensburg	6	0	1	5	4	27	−23	1	
14	TV Eiche Horn	7	0	0	7	4	31	−27	0	

Updated to match(es) played on 4 October 2026. Source: Fussball.de
Rules for classification: 1) Points; 2) Goal difference; 3) Goals scored; 4) Head-to-head results; 5) Head-to-head away goals scored; 6) Away goals scored; 7) Play-off.
