= Borussia Mönchengladbach (women) =

- Founded: 1995
- Ground: Grenzlandstadion
- Capacity: 10,000
- President: Rolf Königs
- Head coach: Jonas Spengler
- League: 2. Bundesliga
- 2025–26: 2. Bundesliga, 10th of 14
Home colours	Away colours	Third colours

Borussia Mönchengladbach is a women's association football club from Mönchengladbach, Germany. It is part of the Borussia Mönchengladbach club.

== History ==
The women's division of Borussia Mönchengladbach was established in 1995, thanks to the backing of manager Rolf Rüssmann. Beginning in the 1995–96 season in the district league, the club progressed steadily, earning promotion to the regional league three years later. After a runner-up position in 2008, Borussia advanced to the Regionalliga West the following year. The appointment of Friedel Baumann as head coach and Regina Weitz as his assistant marked the 2009–10 season, where Borussia secured a second-place finish behind 1. FFC Recklinghausen. Subsequently, they clinched the championship in the following season, earning promotion to the 2. Bundesliga. However, a subsequent relegation to the Regionalliga occurred after narrowly finishing behind ETSV Würzburg on goal difference.

Following another runner-up position in the 2012–13 season, Borussia once again earned promotion to the 2. Bundesliga, where they achieved a historic second-place finish, leading to their first-ever promotion to the Bundesliga, since the division champions TSG 1899 Hoffenheim II were ineligible for promotion. However, their top-flight stint in the 2016–17 season ended with a last-place finish and relegation to the second division. Despite this setback, they rebounded by winning the 2017–18 2. Bundesliga Nord, reclaiming their spot in the Bundesliga. Unfortunately, their second Bundesliga participation resulted in another last-place finish.

In the 2020–21 season, Borussia experienced a 3–1 aggregate defeat against 1899 Hoffenheim II, leading to their relegation to the Regionalliga. However, they bounced back in the 2022–23 season, clinching the top spot in the Regionalliga West and securing promotion to the second division after winning the promotion round against SV Elversberg.

== Players ==
=== Current squad ===
As of 9 September 2026

Note: Flags indicate national team as defined under FIFA eligibility rules; some limited exceptions apply. Players may hold more than one non-FIFA nationality.

No.	Pos.	Nation	Player
2	DF	GER	Miriam Arici
4	DF	NED	Maud Thomassen
5	DF	GER	Paula Klensmann (captain)
6	MF	GER	Fiona Itgenshorst
7	FW	GER	Pauline Deutsch
8	DF	GER	Sofía Cava Marin
9	FW	ENG	Lili Baidoe
10	FW	AUS	Anna Margraf
11	MF	GER	Alina Abdii
13	MF	GER	Luca Graf
15	DF	NED	Sam Drissen

No.	Pos.	Nation	Player
16	DF	NED	Elize Celissen
17	DF	GER	Yvonne Zielinski
19	FW	GER	Mia Giesen
20	FW	NED	Kiki Scholten
21	MF	NED	Suus van der Drift
22	MF	GER	Kristina Bartsch
23	GK	GER	Luisa Palmen
24	MF	NED	Imke Kessels
26	DF	GER	Maresa Arici
32	GK	GER	Nina Hasselmann
33	DF	GER	Marlene Deyß

=== Former Players ===
- (Jamaica) Tiffany Cameron
