= SC Sand =

German sport club from Willstätt, Baden-Württemberg

- Full name: Sportclub Sand 1946 e.V.
- Founded: 11 August 1946; 80 years ago
- Ground: ADAMS Arena (Willstätt)
- Capacity: 2,000
- Manager: Gábor Gallai
- League: 2. Bundesliga
- 2025–26: 2. Bundesliga, 3rd of 14

SC Sand is a German sport club from Willstätt, Baden-Württemberg. The club was founded on 11 August 1946 and competes in football, aerobics, judo, and qigong. The club is most known for its women's football section which plays in the 2. Bundesliga.

== Women's football ==
The women's section was founded in July 1980. Two years later, they participated in league play. After two more years, they reached the Verbandsliga Südbaden, the then highest league. In 1992 the team won the Verbandsliga Championship and played a promotion playoff for the then active Bundesliga. The team lost however. In 1996 the team won the Verbandsliga again and won the promotion playoff. The team achieved a sixth-place finish in its southern Bundesliga division. As the Bundesliga merged both divisions, the team had to play a qualification-round in which the team got second out of four, thus failing to qualify for the next Bundesliga season. In 2004 the 2nd Bundesliga was founded and SC Sand has been playing there from the start achieving only midfield places.

In May 2014, the club was promoted to the Frauen-Bundesliga for the second time in its history. In April 2016, the club advanced to the final of the 2015/16 DFB Cup after a 2–1 victory over eventual German champions FC Bayern Munich, celebrating the greatest success in the club's history to date. On 21 May 2016, they lost the final 2–1 to VfL Wolfsburg. In 2017, they managed to repeat the past season's success in the cup but lost the final against Wolfsburg once again.

In 2022, the club was relegated to the 2nd Bundesliga.

== Recent seasons ==
Season	League	Place	W	D	L	GF	GA	Pts	DFB-Cup
2021–22	Bundesliga	11	3	4	15	16	45	13	Quarterfinals
2022–23	2. Bundesliga	7	9	8	9	24	25	35	Round of 16
2023–24	2. Bundesliga	6	12	7	7	45	32	43	Second round
2024–25	2. Bundesliga	4	14	5	7	66	46	47	Second round
2025–26	2. Bundesliga	3	16	5	5	53	26	53	Quarterfinals
Green marks a season followed by promotion, red a season followed by relegation.

== Current squad ==
As of 28 August 2026

Note: Flags indicate national team as defined under FIFA eligibility rules; some limited exceptions apply. Players may hold more than one non-FIFA nationality.

No.	Pos.	Nation	Player
1	GK	LUX	Lucie Schlimé
2	FW	HAI	Chelsea Surpris
3	DF	GER	Josefine Schaller
4	DF	GER	Denise Landmann
5	MF	GRE	Athanasia Tsaroucha
6	MF	GER	Milena Fischer
7	FW	GER	Melissa Ugochukwu
8	MF	GER	Kim Schneider
9	FW	GER	Pija Reininger
10	FW	DEN	Maria Kirchmann
11	MF	GER	Christina Alp
12	GK	GER	Jolina Petri

No.	Pos.	Nation	Player
13	MF	KOS	Sara Sahiti
14	DF	GER	Charlotte Blümel
15	DF	FIN	Linda Nyman
16	DF	GER	Annalena Heck
18	DF	GER	Sophia Gerber
19	FW	GER	Daniela Schwarz
21	GK	TUR	İlayda İçier
22	FW	FRA	Melisande Ulrich
24	DF	GER	Stefanie Schmid
26	FW	NED	Lenny van Grotel
27	FW	TUR	Vildan Kardeşler
—	DF	GER	Merita Gashi

=== Former players ===
- (Australia) Alana Murphy
- (Austria) Nina Burger
- (Austria) Verena Hanshaw
- (Canada) Alyscha Mottershead
- (Saint Kitts and Nevis) Phoenetia Browne
- (New Zealand) Rebekah Stott
- (Serbia) Jovana Damnjanovic
- (Brazil) Leticia Santos
- (Slovakia) Jana Vojtekova
- (Slovakia) Maria Korenciova
- (Belgium) Justine Vanhaevermaet
- (Italy) Ilaria Mauro
