= FC Ingolstadt 04 (women) =

- Full name: Fußball-Club Ingolstadt 04 e.V.
- Nickname: Die Schanzerinnen
- Founded: 2004; 22 years ago
- Ground: MTV-Stadion
- Capacity: 8,000
- President: Peter Jackwerth
- Manager: Miren Catovic
- League: 2. Bundesliga
- 2025–26: 2. Bundesliga, 7th of 14
Home colours	Away colours	Third colours

FC Ingolstadt 04 is a women's association football club from Ingolstadt, Germany. It is part of the FC Ingolstadt 04 club.

== History ==
FC Ingolstadt began in the 2004–05 Bezirksoberliga Oberbayern, finishing seventh in their debut season. In their second season, they narrowly missed promotion by just one point, securing third place behind FC Forstern and SV Schechen. The following season, they improved to finish as runners-up to SV Schechen. In the 2009–10 season, they finished second, tied on points and goal difference with TSV SF Poing, but with fewer goals scored.

In the 2010–11 season, FC Ingolstadt finished top of the league, earning promotion to the Landesliga Süd. They remained undefeated in their new league, securing a place in the Bayernliga. During their first Bayernliga season in 2012–13, the team finished second, just missing another promotion behind 1. FC Nürnberg. In the following season, they were promoted to the Regionalliga Süd, finishing two points ahead of SV Frauenbiburg.

In the 2018–19 season, FC Ingolstadt became champions of the Regionalliga Süd and won the promotion play-offs against Borussia Bocholt, advancing to the 2. Bundesliga.

== Squad ==
As of 12 July 2026

Note: Flags indicate national team as defined under FIFA eligibility rules; some limited exceptions apply. Players may hold more than one non-FIFA nationality.

No.	Pos.	Nation	Player
1	GK	GER	Franziska Maier
2	DF	GER	Mara Winter
3	DF	GER	Katharina Bauer
5	DF	GER	Lea Wolski
6	MF	GER	Laura Frank
8	MF	GER	Jenny Beyer
9	MF	GER	Emma Kusch
11	MF	CRO	Paula Vidovic
12	GK	GER	Theresa Grundmann
13	MF	AUT	Lara Felix
14	MF	GER	Melissa Kuya Strobel
16	FW	GER	Anabel Keul
17	MF	GER	Leonie Hein

No.	Pos.	Nation	Player
18	FW	GER	Sarah Schauer
19	DF	GER	Anna-Lena Fritz
21	DF	CRO	Jana Mijatović
22	GK	GER	Anna-Lena Daum
24	MF	GER	Stefanie Reischmann (captain)
25	MF	GER	Sarah Tschiers
26	MF	GER	Teresa Frizberg
27	DF	GER	Leonie Haberäcker
29	FW	GER	Nina Penzkofer
—	DF	GER	Jenny Gaugigl
—	DF	GER	Samantha Stiglmair
—	MF	GER	Carina Wüst
—	MF	GER	Mila Steinhart

== Current staff ==
As of 21 June 2024

Coaching staff
(Germany) Miren Catovic	Head coach
(Germany) Thorsten Splieth (Germany) Mario Nurtsch (Germany) Sergio Trommer (Germany) Johannes Stadler	Assistant coach
Managerial staff
(Germany) Simone Wagner	Head of Department
(Germany) Stefanie Hamberger	Team Manager
Medical department
(Germany) Richard Knechtskern (Germany) Florentina Topalaj-Bugujevci	Physiotherapist
