= 2024–25 Frauen-Regionalliga =

Frauen-Regionalliga
- Season: 2024–25
- Dates: 22 August 2024 – 1 June 2025

The 2024–25 season of the Frauen-Regionalliga was the 21st season of Germany's third-tier women's football league.

In the 2024–25 season only, the champions of all five leagues automatically earn a promotion to 2. Bundesliga. This is due to the expansion of Bundesliga to 14 teams beginning with the 2025–26 season.

== Tiebreakers for league ranking ==
The following criteria are applied (in order from top to bottom) to determine the order of the teams in the leagues:

- The total number of points;
- Goal difference in all league matches;
- Number of goals scored in all league matches;
- Total number of points obtained in head-to-head matches;
- Number of away goals scored in head-to-head matches;
- Number of away goals scored in all league matches;

If two teams are still tied after all the above criteria are applied, a play-off match is held at a neutral ground to determine the order.

== Regionalliga Nord ==
=== Table ===
Pos	Team	Pld	W	D	L	GF	GA	GD	Pts	Qualification or relegation
1	Hamburger SV II (Note: Reserve teams cannot compete at the same league level as the respective main team. Ineligible for promotion unless the main team earns promotion to Bundesliga. Hamburger SV II declined the right to promote to 2. Bundesliga.)	22	17	3	2	54	22	+32	54	
2	VfL Wolfsburg II (Note: Reserve teams cannot compete at the same league level as the respective main team. Ineligible for promotion if the main team gets relegated to 2. Bundesliga.) (P)	22	14	3	5	71	20	+51	45	Promotion to 2. Bundesliga
3	Holstein Kiel	22	14	2	6	48	37	+11	44	
4	SV Henstedt-Ulzburg	22	13	3	6	52	33	+19	42	
5	Hannover 96	22	9	4	9	53	30	+23	31	
6	FC St. Pauli	22	8	4	10	41	42	−1	28	
7	TSV Barmke	22	7	7	8	32	38	−6	28	
8	Werder Bremen II	22	6	6	10	24	40	−16	24	
9	Eimsbütteler TV	22	6	4	12	35	51	−16	22	
10	ATS Buntentor	22	6	4	12	36	57	−21	22	
11	SV Meppen II (R)	22	4	6	12	21	52	−31	18	Relegation to lower-level leagues
12	Kieler MTV (R)	22	3	4	15	21	66	−45	13	Relegation to lower-level leagues

Updated to match(es) played on 18 May 2025. Source: Fussball.de
Rules for classification: Tiebreakers
(P) Promoted; (R) Relegated

=== Top scorers ===
Rank	Player	Club	Goals
1	(Germany) Jennifer Michel	SV Henstedt-Ulzburg	18
2	(Germany) Bente Marie Bode	Hannover 96	11
3	(Germany) Hannah Östermann	Kieler MTV	10
4	(Germany) Mira Arouna	VfL Wolfsburg II	9
4	(Germany) Kira Hasse	Holstein Kiel	9
4	(Germany) Michelle Hille	SV Henstedt-Ulzburg	9
4	(Germany) Vera Homp	SV Henstedt-Ulzburg	9
4	(Germany) Ronja Jürgensen	Holstein Kiel	9
4	(Germany) Maya Krieter	Eimsbütteler TV	9
4	(United States) Ebony Madrid	VfL Wolfsburg II	9

== Regionalliga Nordost ==
=== Table ===
Pos	Team	Pld	W	D	L	GF	GA	GD	Pts	Qualification or relegation
1	Viktoria Berlin (P)	22	20	0	2	105	10	+95	60	Promotion to 2. Bundesliga
2	Hertha BSC	22	16	2	4	80	24	+56	50	
3	RB Leipzig II (Note: Reserve teams cannot compete at the same league level as the respective main team. Ineligible for promotion if the main team gets relegated to 2. Bundesliga.)	22	16	1	5	76	23	+53	49	
4	Carl Zeiss Jena II	22	14	1	7	50	31	+19	43	
5	Union Berlin II (Note: Reserve teams cannot compete at the same league level as the respective main team. Ineligible for promotion unless the main team earns promotion to Bundesliga.)	22	11	2	9	53	49	+4	35	
6	1. FFV Erfurt	22	11	2	9	43	42	+1	35	
7	Turbine Potsdam II	22	10	2	10	53	45	+8	32	
8	1. FC Magdeburg	22	9	3	10	47	46	+1	30	
9	Türkiyemspor Berlin	22	6	3	13	37	64	−27	21	
10	Fortuna Dresden	22	3	3	16	17	61	−44	12	
11	Hansa Rostock	22	3	3	16	29	100	−71	12	
12	Bischofswerdaer FV (R)	22	1	2	19	14	109	−95	5	Relegation to lower-level leagues

Updated to match(es) played on 1 June 2025. Source: Fussball.de
Rules for classification: Tiebreakers
(P) Promoted; (R) Relegated

=== Top scorers ===
Rank	Player	Club	Goals
1	(Germany) Elfie Wellhausen	Hertha BSC	27
2	(Germany) Natalie Grenz	RB Leipzig II	21
3	(Germany) Nina Ehegötz	Viktoria Berlin	16
4	(Germany) Kim Urbanek	Viktoria Berlin	14
5	(Germany) Elisa Spolaczyk	Union Berlin II	13
6	(Germany) Lena Magas	1. FC Magdeburg	12
6	(Germany) Leonie Preußler	RB Leipzig II	12
6	(Germany) Lea Schrenk	1. FFV Erfurt	12
6	(Turkey) Senanur Yavuz	Hertha BSC	12
10	(Germany) Helen Börner	Carl Zeiss Jena II	11
10	(Germany) Karla Görlitz	Carl Zeiss Jena II	11
10	(Germany) Henrike Sahlmann	Viktoria Berlin	11
10	(Turkey) Aylin Yaren	Viktoria Berlin	11

== Regionalliga Süd ==
=== Table ===
Pos	Team	Pld	W	D	L	GF	GA	GD	Pts	Qualification or relegation
1	VfB Stuttgart (P)	22	20	2	0	116	16	+100	62	Promotion to 2. Bundesliga
2	TSG Hoffenheim II (Note: Reserve teams cannot compete at the same league level as the respective main team. Ineligible for promotion if the main team gets relegated to 2. Bundesliga.)	22	19	2	1	81	20	+61	59	
3	Wacker München	22	13	5	4	47	34	+13	44	
4	Kickers Offenbach	22	12	3	7	60	39	+21	39	
5	Karlsruher SC	22	11	5	6	65	43	+22	38	
6	Jahn Calden	22	11	3	8	43	47	−4	36	
7	Hessen Wetzlar	22	10	2	10	47	48	−1	32	
8	SC Sand II (Note: Reserve teams cannot compete at the same league level as the respective main team. Ineligible for promotion unless the main team earns promotion to Bundesliga.)	22	4	9	9	34	48	−14	21	
9	Eintracht Frankfurt III (Note: Reserve teams cannot compete at the same league level as the respective main team. Being the 2^{nd} reserve, the team is ineligible for promotion no matter the circumstances.)	22	5	3	14	29	65	−36	18	
10	SV Hegnach (R)	22	3	3	16	27	53	−26	12	Relegation to lower-level leagues
11	Schwaben Augsburg (R)	22	3	2	17	20	76	−56	11	Relegation to lower-level leagues
12	1. FFC Hof (R)	22	1	1	20	13	93	−80	4	Relegation to lower-level leagues

Updated to match(es) played on 18 May 2025. Source: Fussball.de
Rules for classification: Tiebreakers
(P) Promoted; (R) Relegated

=== Top scorers ===
Rank	Player	Club	Goals
1	(Germany) Mandy Islacker	VfB Stuttgart	28
2	(Germany) Johanna Hildebrandt	Jahn Calden	17
2	(Germany) Melissa Zweigner-Genzer	Karlsruher SC	17
4	(Germany) Jana Beuschlein	VfB Stuttgart	16
4	(Germany) Meike Meßmer	VfB Stuttgart	16
6	(Germany) Ann-Sophie Braun	TSG Hoffenheim II	15
7	(Germany) Lisa Maier	Hessen Wetzlar	14
8	(Germany) Mathilda Dillmann	Karlsruher SC	13
8	(Germany) Julia Glaser	VfB Stuttgart	13
10	(Germany) Sonja Kolb	Wacker München	11

== Regionalliga Südwest ==
=== Table ===
Pos	Team	Pld	W	D	L	GF	GA	GD	Pts	Qualification or relegation
1	1. FSV Mainz 05 (P)	22	20	1	1	115	4	+111	61	Promotion to 2. Bundesliga
2	1. FC Saarbrücken	22	18	1	3	61	14	+47	55	
3	SC 13 Bad Neuenahr	22	16	1	5	55	20	+35	49	
4	SV Elversberg	22	14	3	5	71	20	+51	45	
5	1. FFC Montabaur	22	12	2	8	51	44	+7	38	
6	1. FC Riegelsberg	22	11	2	9	55	37	+18	35	
7	TuS Issel	22	11	1	10	46	38	+8	34	
8	SC Siegelbach	22	7	1	14	24	49	−25	22	
9	SG 99 Andernach II (Note: Reserve teams cannot compete at the same league level as the respective main team. Ineligible for promotion unless the main team earns promotion to Bundesliga.)	22	5	4	13	33	66	−33	19	
10	SV Ober-Olm	22	4	2	16	26	78	−52	14	
11	Wormatia Worms	22	3	3	16	32	81	−49	12	
12	SV Dirmingen (R)	22	0	1	21	10	128	−118	1	Relegation to lower-level leagues

Updated to match(es) played on 25 May 2025. Source: Fussball.de
Rules for classification: Tiebreakers
(P) Promoted; (R) Relegated

=== Top scorers ===
Rank	Player	Club	Goals
1	(Germany) Nadine Anstatt	1. FSV Mainz 05	33
2	(Germany) Marie Fischer	1. FFC Montabaur	22
3	(Israel) Vital Kats	1. FSV Mainz 05	19
4	(Germany) Chelsea Agyei	1. FC Saarbrücken	14
5	(Germany) Melanie Jung	1. FC Riegelsberg	13
6	(Kosovo) Rinesa Alija	SG 99 Andernach II	12
6	(Germany) Sonja Bartoschek	SC 13 Bad Neuenahr	12
8	(Germany) Carina Alt	1. FC Riegelsberg	10
8	(Germany) Kara Bathmann	1. FSV Mainz 05	10
8	(Germany) Lea Körner	1. FC Saarbrücken	10
8	(Germany) Lena Reiter	SV Elversberg	10
8	(Germany) Tina Ruh	Wormatia Worms	10
8	(Germany) Jacqueline de Backer	1. FC Riegelsberg	10

== Regionalliga West ==
=== Table ===
Pos	Team	Pld	W	D	L	GF	GA	GD	Pts	Qualification or relegation
1	VfR Warbeyen (P)	26	20	1	5	87	29	+58	61	Promotion to 2. Bundesliga
2	Borussia Mönchengladbach II (Note: Reserve teams cannot compete at the same league level as the respective main team. Ineligible for promotion unless the main team earns promotion to Bundesliga.)	26	15	6	5	52	39	+13	51	
3	Arminia Bielefeld	26	15	4	7	52	26	+26	49	
4	SC Fortuna Köln	26	14	6	6	50	31	+19	48	
5	DJK Wacker Mecklenbeck	26	14	3	9	42	31	+11	45	
6	1. FC Köln II (Note: Reserve teams cannot compete at the same league level as the respective main team. Ineligible for promotion if the main team gets relegated to 2. Bundesliga.)	26	11	4	11	67	40	+27	37	
7	SGS Essen II	26	10	6	10	50	35	+15	36	
8	Bayer Leverkusen II	26	10	5	11	44	47	−3	35	
9	FSV Gütersloh 2009 II (Note: Reserve teams cannot compete at the same league level as the respective main team. Relegated to lower-level leagues because the main team is relegated to Regionalliga West.) (R)	26	9	4	13	37	59	−22	31	Relegation to lower-level leagues
10	1. FFC Recklinghausen	26	9	3	14	34	54	−20	30	
11	SSV Rhade	26	8	6	12	34	55	−21	30	
12	Vorwärts Spoho Köln	26	8	4	14	36	60	−24	28	
13	Alemannia Aachen (R)	26	7	1	18	20	48	−28	22	Relegation to lower-level leagues
14	DJK Südwest Köln (R)	26	4	3	19	38	89	−51	15	Relegation to lower-level leagues

Updated to match(es) played on 18 May 2025. Source: Fussball.de
Rules for classification: Tiebreakers
(P) Promoted; (R) Relegated

=== Top scorers ===
Rank	Player	Club	Goals
1	(Germany) Jolina Opladen	VfR Warbeyen	18
1	(Germany) Alisa Sinani	DJK Südwest Köln	18
3	(Morocco) Narjiss Ahamad	VfR Warbeyen	13
3	(Turkey) Selin Dişli	Borussia Mönchengladbach II	13
3	(Germany) Jocelyn Hampel	Arminia Bielefeld	13
3	(Germany) Antonia Langshausen	1. FC Köln II	13
3	(Germany) Vivien Schwing	SC Fortuna Köln	13
8	(Netherlands) Moisa Verkuijl	VfR Warbeyen	12
9	(Germany) Jule Dallmann	VfR Warbeyen	11
10	(Germany) Sadiat Babatunde	Hessen Wetzlar	10
10	(Germany) Emma Lattus	1. FC Köln II	10
