= 2024–25 Frauen-Regionalliga Nordost =

Frauen-Regionalliga Nordost
- Season: 2024–25
- Dates: 25 August 2024 – 1 June 2025
- Matches played: 132
- Goals scored: 604 (4.58 per match)
- Top goalscorer: (Germany) Elfie Wellhausen (27 goals)
- Biggest home win: Hertha BSC 12–0 FC Hansa Rostock; 2 November 2024
- Biggest away win: FC Hansa Rostock 0–13 FC Viktoria 1889 Berlin; 29 March 2025
- Highest scoring: FC Hansa Rostock 0–13 FC Viktoria 1889 Berlin; 29 March 2025
- Longest winning run: 7 matches RB Leipzig II
- Longest unbeaten run: 7 matches RB Leipzig II
- Longest winless run: 15 matches Bischofswerdaer FV 08
- Longest losing run: 7 matches Fortuna Dresden
- Highest attendance: 2,235; FC Viktoria 1889 Berlin 4–0 Fortuna Dresden; 1 June 2025
- Lowest attendance: 18; FC Carl Zeiss Jena II 6–0 Fortuna Dresden; 23 November 2024
- Attendance: 21,481 (163 per match)
- All statistics correct as of 1 June 2025.

The 2024–25 season of the Frauen-Regionalliga Nordost was the 21st season of the top league of Northeastern German Football Association in women's football. The 2024–25 Regionalliga Nordost was one of the five regional leagues that served as the third-tier of women's leagues in Germany.

The regular season started on 25 August 2024 and concluded on 1 June 2025.

== Teams ==
Locations of teams in the 2024–25 Frauen-Regionalliga Nordost.

=== Team changes ===
Entering league		Exiting league	
Promoted from 2023 to 2024 lower-level leagues	Relegated from 2023–24 2. Bundesliga	Promoted to 2024–25 2. Bundesliga	Relegated to 2024–25 lower-level leagues
FC Hansa Rostock (from Verbandsliga Mecklenburg-Vorpommern); 1. FC Union Berlin II (from Berlin-Liga)		1. FC Union Berlin	Berolina Mitte (to Berlin-Liga)

=== Promotion from lower-level leagues ===
Two promotion spots are decided in a tournament that the six champions of Berlin-Liga, Landesliga Brandenburg, Verbandsliga Mecklenburg-Vorpommern, Landesliga Sachsen, Verbandsliga Sachsen-Anhalt and Thüringenliga are eligible to participate in.

== Standings ==
Pos	Team	Pld	W	D	L	GF	GA	GD	Pts	Qualification or relegation
1	Viktoria Berlin (P)	22	20	0	2	105	10	+95	60	Promotion to 2. Bundesliga
2	Hertha BSC	22	16	2	4	80	24	+56	50	
3	RB Leipzig II (Note: Reserve teams cannot compete at the same league level as the respective main team. Ineligible for promotion if the main team gets relegated to 2. Bundesliga.)	22	16	1	5	76	23	+53	49	
4	Carl Zeiss Jena II	22	14	1	7	50	31	+19	43	
5	Union Berlin II (Note: Reserve teams cannot compete at the same league level as the respective main team. Ineligible for promotion unless the main team earns promotion to Bundesliga.)	22	11	2	9	53	49	+4	35	
6	1. FFV Erfurt	22	11	2	9	43	42	+1	35	
7	Turbine Potsdam II	22	10	2	10	53	45	+8	32	
8	1. FC Magdeburg	22	9	3	10	47	46	+1	30	
9	Türkiyemspor Berlin	22	6	3	13	37	64	−27	21	
10	Fortuna Dresden	22	3	3	16	17	61	−44	12	
11	Hansa Rostock	22	3	3	16	29	100	−71	12	
12	Bischofswerdaer FV (R)	22	1	2	19	14	109	−95	5	Relegation to lower-level leagues

Updated to match(es) played on 1 June 2025. Source: Fussball.de
Rules for classification: Tiebreakers
(P) Promoted; (R) Relegated

== Results ==
Home \ Away	BEH	BET	BU2	BEV	BIS	DRE	ERF	JE2	LE2	MAG	PO2	ROS
Hertha BSC		1–1	5–1	0–2	5–0	4–0	2–0	2–3	1–4	5–0	6–1	12–0
Türkiyemspor Berlin	0–5		0–1	1–4	4–1	5–1	1–2	2–2	0–9	0–5	2–2	2–3
1. FC Union Berlin II	1–3	1–3		0–7	11–1	2–1	1–3	3–2	2–4	4–3	2–0	4–1
FC Viktoria 1889 Berlin	0–3	8–0	6–0		11–0	4–0	6–0	5–0	1–0	5–0	5–1	9–1
Bischofswerdaer FV 08	2–6	0–6	0–2	0–4		1–5	1–5	0–3	0–1	0–2	0–4	3–2
Fortuna Dresden	0–1	0–2	0–6	0–2	1–1		0–2	0–2	1–2	2–2	1–0	1–1
1. FFV Erfurt	2–5	2–1	2–2	2–0	6–0	3–1		0–3	0–3	3–3	0–3	2–0
FC Carl Zeiss Jena II	0–1	3–2	2–1	0–3	7–0	6–0	2–1		3–1	2–3	3–0	3–0
RB Leipzig II	0–1	4–0	2–1	1–3	9–1	5–0	4–1	4–1		1–3	7–3	8–0
1. FC Magdeburg	1–1	3–0	1–2	0–3	8–0	3–1	0–1	0–1	0–4		3–0	4–0
Turbine Potsdam II	3–2	5–0	2–2	1–4	5–1	6–0	2–1	3–0	0–2	5–1		6–1
FC Hansa Rostock	3–9	2–5	1–4	0–13	2–2	1–2	2–5	0–2	1–1	6–2	2–1	

Updated to match(es) played on 1 June 2025. Source: Fussball.de
Legend: Blue = home team win; Yellow = draw; Red = away team win.

== Top goalscorers ==
As of 1 June 2025

Rank	Player	Team	Goals
1	(Germany) Elfie Wellhausen	Hertha BSC	27
2	(Germany) Natalie Grenz	RB Leipzig II	21
3	(Germany) Nina Ehegötz	FC Viktoria 1889 Berlin	16
4	(Germany) Kim Urbanek	FC Viktoria 1889 Berlin	14
5	(Germany) Elisa Spolaczyk	1. FC Union Berlin II	13
6	(Germany) Lena Magas	1. FC Magdeburg	12
6	(Germany) Leonie Preußler	RB Leipzig II	12
6	(Germany) Lea Schrenk	1. FFV Erfurt	12
6	(Turkey) Senanur Yavuz	Hertha BSC	12
10	(Germany) Helen Börner	FC Carl Zeiss Jena II	11
10	(Germany) Karla Görlitz	FC Carl Zeiss Jena II	11
10	(Germany) Henrike Sahlmann	FC Viktoria 1889 Berlin	11
10	(Turkey) Aylin Yaren	FC Viktoria 1889 Berlin	11
