= Katrin Prühs =

German footballer

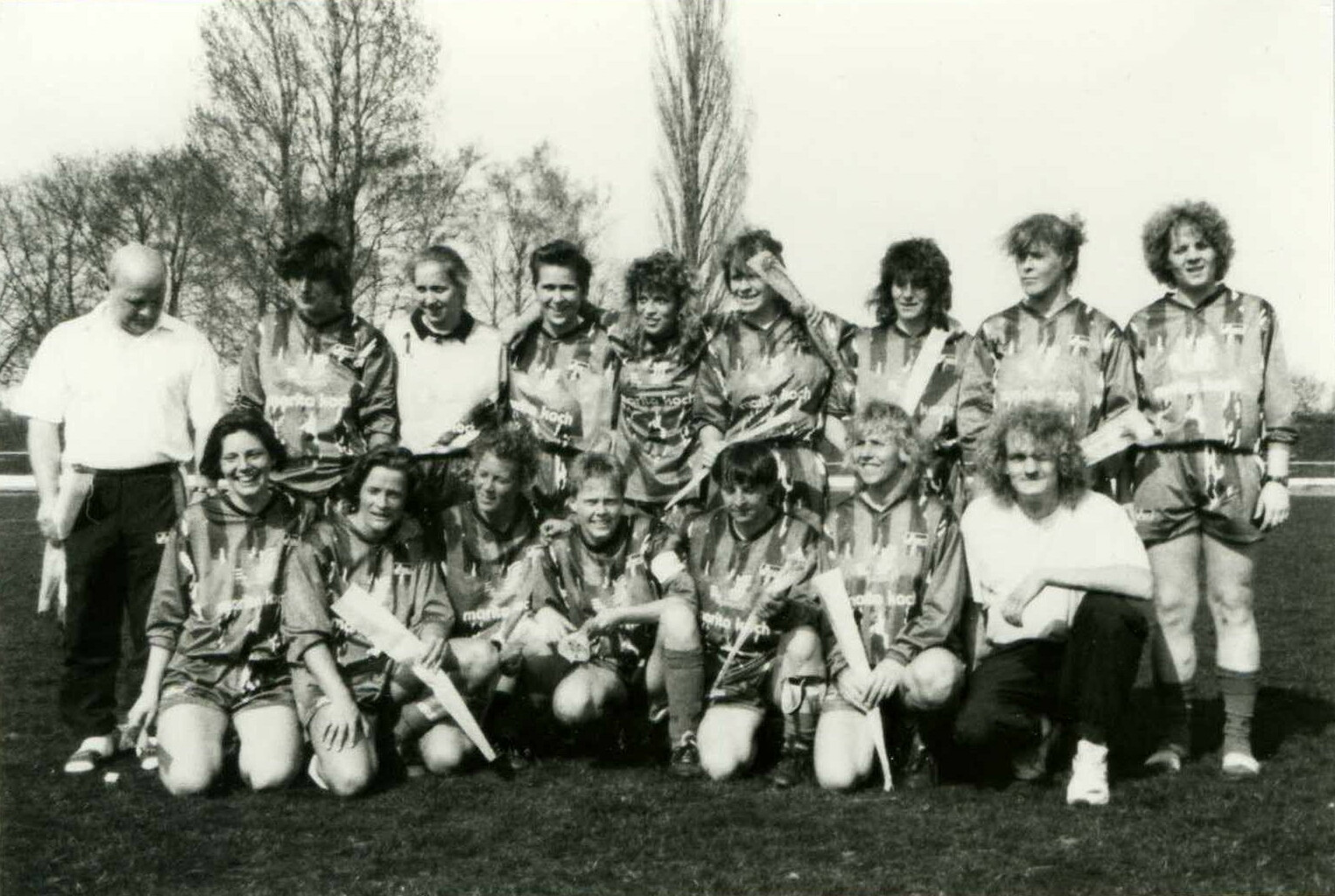
- Katrin Prühs (front row, second from right, kneeling) with the Polizei SV Rostock women's team in 1995

Personal information
- Full name: Katrin Prühs
- Birth name: Katrin Erdmann
- Date of birth: 9 January 1962 (age 64)
- Place of birth: Rostock, East Germany
- Position: Forward

Senior career*
Years	Team	Apps	(Gls)
–1991	BSG Post Rostock		
1991–1993	FC Hansa Rostock		
1993–?	PSV Rostock		
2007	Tennis Borussia Berlin		

International career
1990	East Germany	1	(0)
- * Club domestic league appearances and goals

Katrin Prühs (née Erdmann; born 9 January 1962) is a German former footballer who played as a forward, appearing for the East Germany women's national team in their first and only match on 9 May 1990.

== Career statistics ==
=== International ===
East Germany
Year	Apps	Goals
1990	1	0
Total	1	0

== Honours ==
=== Club ===
BSG Post Rostock

- East German championship: 1990
- East German cup: 1990

=== Individual ===
- East German Women's Footballer of the Year: 1990
