= 2017–18 2. Frauen-Bundesliga =

2. Frauen-Bundesliga
- Season: 2017–18
- Champions: Borussia Mönchengladbach (Nord); 1899 Hoffenheim II (Süd)
- Promoted: Borussia Mönchengladbach; Bayer Leverkusen
- Relegated: USV Jena II; Arminia Bielefeld; SV Henstedt-Ulzburg; Jahn Delmenhorst; Blau-Weiß Hohen Neuendorf; Herforder SV; VfL Sindelfingen; Schott Mainz; SC Freiburg II; 1. FFC Niederkirchen; SG Andernach; 1. FC Köln II
- Matches: 264
- Goals: 1,031 (3.91 per match)
- Top goalscorer: Nord: Sarah Grünheid (16 goals); Süd: Jana Beuschlein; Jacqueline de Backer (18 goals each)

The 2017–18 2. Frauen-Bundesliga was the fourteenth season of Germany's second-tier women's football league. This was also the last before the league reform; the next season was played in one division instead of two.

== Nord ==
The season started on 3 September 2017 and ended on 13 May 2018. Jahn Delmenhorst was promoted from the 2016–17 Regionalliga Nord and FF USV Jena II was promoted from the 2016–17 Regionalliga Nordost.

Pos	Team	Pld	W	D	L	GF	GA	GD	Pts	Promotion, qualification or relegation
1	Borussia Mönchengladbach (C, P)	22	15	4	3	75	25	+50	49	Promotion to 2018–19 Bundesliga
2	VfL Wolfsburg II (Note: Reserve teams cannot compete in the Frauen-Bundesliga and therefore are ineligible for promotion.)	22	14	4	4	65	14	+51	46	
3	SV Meppen	22	14	4	4	71	32	+39	46	
4	Turbine Potsdam II	22	14	0	8	70	39	+31	42	
5	BV Cloppenburg	22	12	4	6	53	29	+24	40	
6	FSV Gütersloh	22	11	3	8	64	45	+19	36	
7	USV Jena II (R)	22	11	3	8	40	35	+5	36	Qualification for the relegation play-offs
8	Arminia Bielefeld (R)	22	11	2	9	46	30	+16	35	Relegation to 2018–19 Regionalliga
9	SV Henstedt-Ulzburg (R)	22	5	1	16	36	90	−54	16	Relegation to 2018–19 Regionalliga
10	Jahn Delmenhorst (R)	22	4	2	16	25	81	−56	14	Relegation to 2018–19 Regionalliga
11	Blau-Weiß Hohen Neuendorf (R)	22	2	4	16	18	76	−58	10	Relegation to 2018–19 Regionalliga
12	Herforder SV (R)	22	2	3	17	27	94	−67	9	Relegation to 2018–19 Regionalliga

Source: DFB
Rules for classification: 1) Points; 2) Goal difference; 3) Goals scored
(C) Champions; (P) Promoted; (R) Relegated

=== Results ===
Home \ Away	BIE	CLO	DEL	GÜT	HEN	HER	NEU	JEN	MEP	MÖN	POT	WOL
Arminia Bielefeld	—	1–2	1–0	1–0	4–2	2–0	5–1	2–0	1–4	1–2	1–4	2–0
BV Cloppenburg	3–0	—	6–0	2–1	6–0	3–0	2–2	1–2	1–1	0–0	1–2	0–4
Jahn Delmenhorst	1–5	0–3	—	2–3	4–2	4–3	0–0	0–6	0–4	1–4	4–1	0–4
FSV Gütersloh	1–1	4–3	6–1	—	9–2	4–0	6–1	4–3	2–3	1–4	4–1	0–2
SV Henstedt-Ulzburg	1–6	1–5	3–1	4–1	—	4–3	3–1	0–1	1–2	1–5	0–6	1–6
Herforder SV	0–7	1–3	0–3	4–1	2–2	—	0–0	2–3	4–4	1–11	0–3	1–7
Blau-Weiß Hohen Neuendorf	0–3	0–5	2–0	0–5	2–3	0–2	—	1–2	4–3	1–2	0–9	1–1
FF USV Jena II	1–1	3–1	0–0	2–3	3–0	2–1	3–1	—	2–5	3–1	1–4	0–0
SV Meppen	1–0	2–2	8–2	2–1	4–2	12–0	10–0	1–0	—	1–0	1–3	1–0
Borussia Mönchengladbach	1–0	3–0	2–1	2–2	6–2	8–2	6–1	4–2	1–1	—	3–0	1–2
Turbine Potsdam II	2–1	1–2	9–1	5–6	5–2	7–1	1–0	0–1	5–1	0–7	—	0–1
VfL Wolfsburg II	4–1	1–2	9–0	0–0	8–0	4–0	5–0	3–0	1–0	2–2	1–2	—

Source: DFB
Legend: Blue = home team win; Yellow = draw; Red = away team win.

=== Top scorers ===
Rank	Player	Club	Goals
1	(Germany) Sarah Grünheid	Arminia Bielefeld	16
1	(Germany) Alina Witt	SV Henstedt-Ulzburg	16
3	(Germany) Jalila Dalaf	SV Meppen	15
3	(Germany) Melissa Kössler	Turbine Potsdam II	15
3	(Germany) Anna-Lena Stolze	VfL Wolfsburg II	15
3	(Poland) Agnieszka Winczo	BV Cloppenburg	15
7	(Netherlands) Liv Aerts	Borussia Mönchengladbach	14
7	(Germany) Josephine Giard	FSV Gütersloh	14
7	(Germany) Kelly Simons	Borussia Mönchengladbach	14
10	(Germany) Shpresa Aradini	FSV Gütersloh	13

== Süd ==
The season started on 2 September 2017 and ended on 13 May 2018. 1. FC Köln II was promoted from the 2016–17 Regionalliga West, SG Andernach was promoted from the 2016–17 Regionalliga Südwest and SC Freiburg II was promoted from the 2016–17 Regionalliga Süd.

Pos	Team	Pld	W	D	L	GF	GA	GD	Pts	Promotion, qualification or relegation
1	1899 Hoffenheim II (Note: Reserve teams cannot compete in the Frauen-Bundesliga and therefore are ineligible for promotion.) (C)	22	18	2	2	61	17	+44	56	
2	Bayern Munich II	22	17	3	2	59	19	+40	54	
3	Bayer Leverkusen (P)	22	13	2	7	47	37	+10	41	Promotion to 2018–19 Bundesliga
4	1. FC Saarbrücken	22	10	6	6	48	36	+12	36	
5	1. FFC Frankfurt II	22	10	3	9	38	27	+11	33	
6	Hessen Wetzlar	22	10	1	11	33	34	−1	31	
7	VfL Sindelfingen (R)	22	6	9	7	26	31	−5	27	Qualification for the relegation play-offs
8	Schott Mainz (R)	22	7	5	10	31	49	−18	26	Relegation to 2018–19 Regionalliga
9	SC Freiburg II (R)	22	5	7	10	28	31	−3	22	Relegation to 2018–19 Regionalliga
10	1. FFC Niederkirchen (R)	22	4	4	14	18	54	−36	16	Relegation to 2018–19 Regionalliga
11	SG Andernach (R)	22	4	2	16	29	52	−23	14	Relegation to 2018–19 Regionalliga
12	1. FC Köln II (R)	22	2	8	12	23	54	−31	14	Relegation to 2018–19 Regionalliga

Source: DFB
Rules for classification: 1) Points; 2) Goal difference; 3) Goals scored
(C) Champions; (P) Promoted; (R) Relegated

=== Results ===
Home \ Away	AND	FRA	FRE	HOF	KÖL	LEV	MAI	MÜC	NIE	SAA	SIN	WET
SG Andernach	—	1–3	1–3	1–2	3–0	3–4	1–2	0–3	1–2	1–5	2–2	2–3
1. FFC Frankfurt II	0–1	—	1–2	1–2	2–2	1–2	6–1	0–2	5–0	0–1	0–0	3–2
SC Freiburg II	5–1	0–2	—	0–2	2–0	1–2	1–1	0–2	0–1	2–2	0–0	0–1
1899 Hoffenheim II	4–1	0–1	1–1	—	4–1	4–2	2–0	4–0	5–0	4–0	1–1	3–0
1. FC Köln II	1–0	0–1	1–1	0–4	—	2–3	2–2	1–5	2–1	1–2	2–2	0–3
Bayer Leverkusen	2–1	3–0	2–1	0–1	3–1	—	1–1	3–2	3–0	2–3	6–1	2–3
Schott Mainz	2–4	1–0	3–2	2–3	2–2	1–0	—	0–6	4–1	1–2	1–0	1–2
Bayern Munich II	1–0	3–1	3–1	3–1	1–1	6–1	6–1	—	3–0	1–1	3–1	3–1
1. FFC Niederkirchen	3–0	1–5	1–1	1–2	1–1	1–2	1–4	0–2	—	1–6	1–1	0–2
1. FC Saarbrücken	2–2	2–4	1–4	0–3	9–1	1–1	3–3	1–2	1–1	—	1–0	1–0
VfL Sindelfingen	2–1	0–0	2–0	1–5	1–1	2–1	2–0	0–0	4–0	1–4	—	0–1
Hessen Wetzlar	1–2	1–2	1–1	1–4	2–1	1–2	1–2	1–2	4–0	1–0	1–3	—

Source: DFB
Legend: Blue = home team win; Yellow = draw; Red = away team win.

=== Top scorers ===
Rank	Player	Club	Goals
1	(Germany) Jana Beuschlein	1899 Hoffenheim II	18
1	(Germany) Jacqueline de Backer	1. FC Saarbrücken	18
3	(Germany) Annika Eberhardt	1899 Hoffenheim II	15
4	(Germany) Selina Cerci	Bayern Munich II	14
4	(Germany) Jasmin Stümper	SG Andernach	14
6	(Hungary) Henrietta Csiszár	Bayer Leverkusen	10
6	(Germany) Gina Rilling	VfL Sindelfingen	10
6	(Germany) Anja Selensky	1. FC Saarbrücken	10
9	(Germany) Selina Heinzeroth	Hessen Wetzlar	9
9	(Germany) Anja Pfluger	Bayern Munich II	9
9	(Germany) Lena Uebach	Bayer Leverkusen	9

== Relegation play-offs ==
The two seventh-placed teams from the two 2. Bundesliga divisions, the five division champions from the 2017–18 Regionalliga and one second-placed team from the Regionalliga were divided into two groups of four to compete for two more spots in the 2018–19 2. Bundesliga.

The matches were played on 21 May, 27 May and 3 June.

=== Group 1 ===
Pos	Team	Pld	W	D	L	GF	GA	GD	Pts	Qualification	WEI	JEN	FRA	SPE
1	SV Weinberg	3	3	0	0	11	1	+10	9	Qualification for 2. Bundesliga	—	—	—	4–1
2	USV Jena II (Note: Since USV Jena was relegated from the 2017–18 Frauen-Bundesliga, their second team was automatically relegated to the Regionalliga. If they won the group in this case, then the second-placed team from the group qualified for the 2. Bundesliga.)	3	2	0	1	7	6	+1	6	Qualification for Regionalliga	0–4	—	3–1	—
3	Eintracht Frankfurt	3	1	0	2	8	7	+1	3	Qualification for Regionalliga	0–3	—	—	7–1
4	FC Speyer	3	0	0	3	3	15	−12	0	Qualification for Regionalliga	—	1–4	—	—

Source: DFB
Rules for classification: 1) Points; 2) Head-to-head points; 3) Head-to-head goal difference; 4) Head-to-head goals scored; 5) Reapply criteria 2–4 exclusively to teams in question; 6) Goal difference; 7) Goals scored; 8) Fair play conduct; 9) Drawing of lots.

=== Group 2 ===
Pos	Team	Pld	W	D	L	GF	GA	GD	Pts	Qualification	ESS	MAG	SIN	BER
1	SGS Essen II	3	3	0	0	7	0	+7	9	Qualification for 2. Bundesliga	—	—	2–0	—
2	Magdeburger FFC	3	2	0	1	3	3	0	6	Qualification for Regionalliga	0–3	—	—	—
3	VfL Sindelfingen	3	0	1	2	0	3	−3	1	Qualification for Regionalliga	—	0–1	—	0–0
4	Union Berlin	3	0	1	2	0	4	−4	1	Qualification for Regionalliga	0–2	0–2	—	—

Source: DFB
Rules for classification: 1) Points; 2) Head-to-head points; 3) Head-to-head goal difference; 4) Head-to-head goals scored; 5) Reapply criteria 2–4 exclusively to teams in question; 6) Goal difference; 7) Goals scored; 8) Fair play conduct; 9) Drawing of lots.
