= Sybille Brüdgam =

German footballer

Personal information
- Full name: Sybille Brüdgam
- Date of birth: 4 December 1965 (age 60)
- Place of birth: Kleinmachnow, East Germany
- Position: Midfielder

Senior career*
Years	Team	Apps	(Gls)
1983–1990	Turbine Potsdam		
1995–?	Tennis Borussia Berlin		

International career
1990	East Germany	1	(0)
- * Club domestic league appearances and goals

Sybille Brüdgam (born 4 December 1965) is a German former footballer who played as a midfielder, appearing for the East Germany women's national team in their first and only match on 9 May 1990.

== Career statistics ==
=== International ===
East Germany
Year	Apps	Goals
1990	1	0
Total	1	0
