= East Germany women's national football team =

Women's football team of East Germany

East Germany
1990
- Association: Deutscher Fußball-Verband der DDR (DFV)
- Confederation: UEFA (Europe)
- Head coach: Bernd Schröder
- Captain: Sybille Brüdgam
- Most caps: See capped players
- Top scorer: None
- Home stadium: Karl-Liebknecht-Stadion, Potsdam
- FIFA code: GDR

Only international
- East Germany 0–3 Czechoslovakia (Potsdam, East Germany; 9 May 1990)

The East Germany women's national football team was in 1990 the women's football team of East Germany.

== Competitive record ==
=== European Championship ===
UEFA Women's Championship record
Year	Round	Position	Pld	W	D	L	GF	GA
1984	Did not enter							
(Norway) 1987	Did not enter							
(West Germany) 1989	Did not enter							
(Denmark) 1991	Did not enter							
Total	0/4	—	0	0	0	0	0	0

== Squad ==
None of the capped players went on to represent the Germany national team following reunification. However, Birte Weiß, who was in the squad but did not make an appearance, would go on to be capped twice for Germany.

No.	Pos.	Player	Date of birth (age)	Caps	Goals	Club
	GK	Anett Viertel	16 October 1967 (aged 22)	1	0	(Deutscher Fußball-Verband der DDR) Rotation Schlema
	MF	Petra Jachtner		0	0	(Deutscher Fußball-Verband der DDR) Numerik Karl-Marx-Stadt
	DF	Heike Hoffmann	7 September 1963 (aged 26)	1	0	(Deutscher Fußball-Verband der DDR) Turbine Potsdam
	DF	Beate Reuer		0	0	(Deutscher Fußball-Verband der DDR) Turbine Potsdam
	DF	Kathrin Hecker	11 July 1963 (aged 26)	1	0	(Deutscher Fußball-Verband der DDR) Rotation Schlema
	DF	Petra Weschenfelder	22 April 1964 (aged 26)	1	0	(Deutscher Fußball-Verband der DDR) Uni Jena
	DF	Sybille Lange	19 April 1964 (aged 26)	1	0	(Deutscher Fußball-Verband der DDR) Post Rostock
	MF	Sybille Brüdgam (captain)	4 December 1965 (aged 24)	1	0	(Deutscher Fußball-Verband der DDR) Turbine Potsdam
	MF	Heike Ulmer	6 December 1967 (aged 22)	1	0	(Deutscher Fußball-Verband der DDR) Rotation Schlema
	MF	Carmen Weiß	1 March 1968 (aged 22)	1	0	(Deutscher Fußball-Verband der DDR) Wismut Karl-Marx-Stadt
	FW	Katrin Prühs	9 January 1962 (aged 28)	1	0	(Deutscher Fußball-Verband der DDR) Post Rostock
	FW	Sabine Berger	21 January 1966 (aged 24)	1	0	(Deutscher Fußball-Verband der DDR) Turbine Potsdam
	FW	Dana Krumbiegel	22 November 1969 (aged 20)	1	0	(Deutscher Fußball-Verband der DDR) Wismut Karl-Marx-Stadt
	FW	Doreen Meier	9 November 1968 (aged 21)	1	0	(Deutscher Fußball-Verband der DDR) Uni Jena
	FW	Katrin Baaske	10 January 1969 (aged 21)	1	0	(Deutscher Fußball-Verband der DDR) Post Rostock
	DF	Heidi Vater	7 July 1966 (aged 23)	1	0	(Deutscher Fußball-Verband der DDR) Uni Jena
	MF	Katrin Niklas		0	0	(Deutscher Fußball-Verband der DDR) KWO Berlin
	GK	Maika Alex	8 November 1968 (aged 21)	0	0	(Deutscher Fußball-Verband der DDR) Handwerk Magdeburg
		Sabine Tannenberger		0	0	(Deutscher Fußball-Verband der DDR) Wismut Karl-Marx-Stadt
	FW	Birte Weiß	5 June 1971 (aged 18)	0	0	(Deutscher Fußball-Verband der DDR) Rotation Schlema

== Players ==
Below is a list of the 14 players who were capped for East Germany in their only match. Players in italics were substitutes.

None of the players managed to score a goal in the match.

Player	Pos.	Min.	Ref.
Katrin Baaske	FW	60	
Sabine Berger	FW	30	
Sybille Brüdgam	MF	90	
Kathrin Hecker	DF	90	
Heike Hoffmann	DF	90	
Dana Krumbiegel	FW	90	
Sybille Lange	FW	90	
Doreen Meier	FW	90	
Katrin Prühs	FW	90	
Heike Ulmer	MF	45	
Heidi Vater	DF	20	
Anett Viertel	GK	90	
Carmen Weiß	MF	45	
Petra Weschenfelder	DF	70	

== Coaches ==
- 1990: Bernd Schröder

== See also ==
- Women's football in East Germany
