= Katrin Baaske =

German footballer

Personal information
- Full name: Katrin Baaske
- Date of birth: 10 January 1969 (age 57)
- Place of birth: Rostock, East Germany
- Height: 1.72 m (5 ft 8 in)
- Position: Forward

Senior career*
Years	Team	Apps	(Gls)
–1991	BSG Post Rostock		
1991–1993	FC Hansa Rostock		
1993–?	PSV Rostock		

International career
1990	East Germany	1	(0)
- * Club domestic league appearances and goals

Katrin Baaske (born 10 January 1969), later known as Katrin Krüger-Baaske, is a German former footballer who played as a forward, appearing for the East Germany women's national team in their first and only match on 9 May 1990.

== Career statistics ==
=== International ===
East Germany
Year	Apps	Goals
1990	1	0
Total	1	0

== Honours ==
BSG Post Rostock

- East German championship: 1990
- East German cup: 1990
