= 2024–25 Frauen-Regionalliga West =

Frauen-Regionalliga West
- Season: 2024–25
- Dates: 22 August 2024 – 18 May 2025
- Matches: 182
- Goals: 643 (3.53 per match)
- Top goalscorer: Jolina Opladen; Alisa Sinani (18 goals)
- Biggest home win: VfR Warbeyen 10–0 Alemannia Aachen; 22 September 2024
- Biggest away win: 1. FC Köln II 1–6 VfR Warbeyen; 12 October 2024
- Highest scoring: VfR Warbeyen 10–0 Alemannia Aachen; 22 September 2024
- Longest winning run: 11 matches VfR Warbeyen
- Longest unbeaten run: 11 matches VfR Warbeyen
- Longest winless run: 12 matches DJK Südwest Köln
- Longest losing run: 12 matches DJK Südwest Köln
- Highest attendance: 609; Arminia Bielefeld 2–0 1. FFC Recklinghausen; 10 May 2025
- Lowest attendance: 15; SGS Essen II 2–2 FSV Gütersloh 2009 II; 6 April 2025
- Attendance: 13,823 (76 per match)
- All statistics correct as of 18 May 2025.

The 2024–25 season of the Frauen-Regionalliga West was the 21st season of the top league of Western German Football Association in women's football. The 2024–25 Regionalliga West was one of the five regional leagues that serve as the third-tier women's league in Germany.

The 2024–25 season started on 22 August 2024 with an advance first matchday Cologne derby between Vorwärts Spoho Köln and 1. FC Köln II.

== Teams ==
Locations of teams in the 2024–25 Frauen-Regionalliga West.

=== Team changes ===
Entering league		Exiting league	
Promoted from 2023 to 2024 lower-level leagues	Relegated from 2023–24 2. Bundesliga	Promoted to 2024–25 2. Bundesliga	Relegated to 2024–25 lower-level leagues
DJK Wacker Mecklenbeck (from Westfalenliga); Borussia Mönchengladbach II (from Niederrheinliga); DJK Südwest Köln (from Mittelrheinliga)		VfL Bochum	SV 1913 Walbeck (to Niederrheinliga); Sportfreunde Siegen (to a district league (Note: Sportfreunde Siegen withdrew from the Regionalliga at the beginning of the 2023–24 season, causing them to be instantly relegated.))

=== Promotion from lower-level leagues ===
The three champions of Mittelrheinliga, Niederrheinliga and Westfalenliga are promoted.

== League table ==
Pos	Team	Pld	W	D	L	GF	GA	GD	Pts	Qualification or relegation
1	VfR Warbeyen (P)	26	20	1	5	87	29	+58	61	Promotion to 2. Bundesliga
2	Borussia Mönchengladbach II (Note: Reserve teams cannot compete at the same league level as the respective main team. Ineligible for promotion unless the main team earns promotion to Bundesliga.)	26	15	6	5	52	39	+13	51	
3	Arminia Bielefeld	26	15	4	7	52	26	+26	49	
4	SC Fortuna Köln	26	14	6	6	50	31	+19	48	
5	DJK Wacker Mecklenbeck	26	14	3	9	42	31	+11	45	
6	1. FC Köln II (Note: Reserve teams cannot compete at the same league level as the respective main team. Ineligible for promotion if the main team gets relegated to 2. Bundesliga.)	26	11	4	11	67	40	+27	37	
7	SGS Essen II	26	10	6	10	50	35	+15	36	
8	Bayer Leverkusen II	26	10	5	11	44	47	−3	35	
9	FSV Gütersloh 2009 II (Note: Reserve teams cannot compete at the same league level as the respective main team. Relegated to lower-level leagues because the main team is relegated to Regionalliga West.) (R)	26	9	4	13	37	59	−22	31	Relegation to lower-level leagues
10	1. FFC Recklinghausen	26	9	3	14	34	54	−20	30	
11	SSV Rhade	26	8	6	12	34	55	−21	30	
12	Vorwärts Spoho Köln	26	8	4	14	36	60	−24	28	
13	Alemannia Aachen (R)	26	7	1	18	20	48	−28	22	Relegation to lower-level leagues
14	DJK Südwest Köln (R)	26	4	3	19	38	89	−51	15	Relegation to lower-level leagues

Updated to match(es) played on 18 May 2025. Source: Fussball.de
Rules for classification: Tiebreakers
(P) Promoted; (R) Relegated

== Results ==
Home \ Away	AAC	BIE	ES2	GU2	KF2	KSW	KFO	KVS	LE2	MEC	MO2	REC	RHA	WAB
Alemannia Aachen		0–1	1–2	2–0	0–2	0–1	1–2	2–1	1–2	1–0	1–0	0–1	1–0	1–4
Arminia Bielefeld	2–0 (Note: The match was not played due to the fact that Aachen had to many absences due to sickness.)		3–1	4–0	3–0	3–1	1–1	5–1	2–1	0–0	4–2	2–0	0–0	2–1
SGS Essen II	0–2	0–0		2–2	2–0 (Note: The match, originally ended in a 1–2 win for Köln, but Essen was declared the win afterwards.)	7–0	1–2	4–0	2–2	5–1	0–1	0–0	5–1	2–0
FSV Gütersloh 2009 II	1–0	1–4	0–4		0–3	2–1	3–5	0–0	2–2	1–0	0–3	5–0	1–3	0–5
1. FC Köln II	4–0	1–0	3–1	7–0		9–0	1–1	5–2	1–2	2–4	1–1	8–0	8–0	1–6
DJK Südwest Köln	2–1	3–4	3–1	1–2	1–5		1–1	2–3	0–3	4–3	2–3	1–3	1–3	1–3
SC Fortuna Köln	2–0	2–0	1–1	1–1	5–1	6–0		2–1	2–1	0–3	1–3	5–0	3–0	0–1
Vorwärts Spoho Köln	3–1	0–3	2–1	3–5	2–2	2–1	1–0		1–3	0–1	2–1	3–2	1–1	0–3
Bayer Leverkusen II	0–0	2–1	2–5	0–2 (Note: The match, originally ended in a 1–0 win for Leverkusen, but Gütersloh was declared the win due to the fact that Leverkusen used a player that was not eligible to play.)	2–1	8–1	3–1	1–1		0–3	0–2 (Note: The match was awarded.)	3–1	5–1	0–4
DJK Wacker Mecklenbeck	2–0	1–0	0–1	3–2	3–1	3–1	0–1	2–0	1–0		2–2	2–2	4–1	2–1
Borussia Mönchengladbach II	1–0	2–1	1–1	3–0	2–1	3–2	2–2	5–3	3–1	2–1		3–0	2–2	3–1
1. FFC Recklinghausen	2–4	0–4	1–0	0–2	1–0	6–3	0–1	2–1	2–0	0–1	1–1		3–1	1–2
SSV Rhade	3–1	2–1	5–1	0–4	0–0	1–1	1–2	1–2	1–1	2–0	2–1	2–1		0–1
VfR Warbeyen	10–0	4–2	2–1	3–1	2–0	4–4	4–1	5–1	6–0	2–0	8–0	0–5	5–1	

Updated to match(es) played on 18 May 2025. Source: Fussball.de
Legend: Blue = home team win; Yellow = draw; Red = away team win.

== Top goalscorers ==
As of 18 May 2025

Rank	Player	Team	Goals
1	(Germany) Jolina Opladen	VfR Warbeyen	18
1	(Germany) Alisa Sinani	DJK Südwest Köln	18
3	(Morocco) Narjiss Ahamad	VfR Warbeyen	13
3	(Germany) Selin Disli	Borussia Mönchengladbach II	13
3	(Germany) Jocelyn Hampel	Arminia Bielefeld	13
3	(Germany) Antonia Langshausen	1. FC Köln II	13
3	(Germany) Vivien Schwing	SC Fortuna Köln	13
8	(Netherlands) Moisa Verkuijl	VfR Warbeyen	12
9	(Germany) Jule Dallmann	VfR Warbeyen	11
10	(Germany) Sadiat Babatunde	Borussia Mönchengladbach II	10
10	(Germany) Emma Lattus	1. FC Köln II	10
