= 2016–17 Frauen-Regionalliga =

Regionalliga (women)
- Season: 2016–17
- Champions: Werder Bremen II (North); FF USV Jena II (Northeast); SG Andernach (Southwest); SC Freiburg II (South); 1. FC Köln II (West)
- Promoted: TV Jahn Delmenhorst (North); FF USV Jena II (Northeast); SG Andernach (Southwest); SC Freiburg II (South); 1. FC Köln II (West)
- Relegated: TSV Duwo 08; FC Bergedorf 85 (withdrawn); FFV Leipzig (withdrawn); FSV Babelsberg 74; 1. FFV Erfurt; SG Parr Medelsheim; TSV Jahn Calden; FSV Hessen Wetzlar II; Hegauer FV; Vorwärts Spoho Köln; MSV Duisburg II
- Matches: 646
- Goals: 2,481 (3.84 per match)
- Top goalscorer: Isabelle Stümper (26 goals)

The 2016–17 season of the women's Regionalliga was the 13th season of Germany's third-tier women's football league using the current format.

== North ==
| Pos | Team | Pld | W | D | L | GF | GA | GD | Pts | Qualification or relegation |
|---|---|---|---|---|---|---|---|---|---|---|
| 1 | Werder Bremen II (C) | 20 | 17 | 1 | 2 | 83 | 27 | +56 | 52 | |
| 2 | TV Jahn Delmenhorst (P) | 20 | 14 | 2 | 4 | 72 | 34 | +38 | 44 | Promotion to 2017–18 2. Bundesliga |
| 3 | FC St. Pauli | 20 | 12 | 3 | 5 | 50 | 38 | +12 | 39 | |
| 4 | Holstein Kiel | 20 | 10 | 4 | 6 | 43 | 34 | +9 | 34 | |
| 5 | TSV Limmer | 20 | 9 | 3 | 8 | 39 | 33 | +6 | 30 | |
| 6 | VfL Jesteburg | 20 | 9 | 2 | 9 | 51 | 55 | −4 | 29 | |
| 7 | Fortuna Celle | 20 | 6 | 4 | 10 | 37 | 48 | −11 | 22 | |
| 8 | ATS Buntentor | 20 | 5 | 7 | 8 | 36 | 51 | −15 | 22 | |
| 9 | TSV Havelse | 20 | 6 | 3 | 11 | 34 | 60 | −26 | 21 | |
| 10 | TSG Burg Gretesch | 20 | 4 | 2 | 14 | 28 | 52 | −24 | 14 | |
| 11 | TSV Duwo 08 (R) | 20 | 2 | 1 | 17 | 23 | 64 | −41 | 7 | Relegation to Oberliga/Verbandsliga |
| 12 | FC Bergedorf 85 (Note: FC Bergedorf withdrew its women's team during the winter break. All records were expunged.) (R) | 0 | 0 | 0 | 0 | 0 | 0 | 0 | 0 | Relegation to Oberliga/Verbandsliga |

Rules for classification: 1) Points; 2) Goal difference; 3) Goals scored
(C) Champions; (P) Promoted; (R) Relegated

=== Top scorers ===
As of 21 May 2017.

| Rank | Player | Club | Goals |
|---|---|---|---|
| 1 | (Germany) Mareike Kregel | Werder Bremen II | 22 |
| 2 | (Germany) Nahrin Uyar | TV Jahn Delmenhorst | 17 |
| 2 | (Germany) Nina Philipp | FC St. Pauli | 17 |
| 4 | (Germany) Anna Mirbach | TV Jahn Delmenhorst | 16 |
| 5 | (Germany) Lisa Zimmermann | Fortuna Celle | 15 |
| 6 | (Germany) Kira Buller | Werder Bremen II | 14 |
| 6 | (Germany) Julia Hechtenberg | TV Jahn Delmenhorst | 14 |
| 8 | 3 players | | 13 |

== Northeast ==
| Pos | Team | Pld | W | D | L | GF | GA | GD | Pts | Qualification or relegation |
|---|---|---|---|---|---|---|---|---|---|---|
| 1 | FF USV Jena II (C, P) | 18 | 14 | 3 | 1 | 79 | 12 | +67 | 45 | Promotion to 2017–18 2. Bundesliga |
| 2 | Magdeburger FFC | 18 | 13 | 3 | 2 | 56 | 13 | +43 | 42 | |
| 3 | BSC Marzahn | 18 | 12 | 2 | 4 | 54 | 25 | +29 | 38 | |
| 4 | FC Viktoria 1889 Berlin | 18 | 10 | 5 | 3 | 41 | 22 | +19 | 35 | |
| 5 | 1. FFC Fortuna Dresden | 18 | 7 | 5 | 6 | 31 | 28 | +3 | 26 | |
| 6 | FC Erzgebirge Aue | 18 | 7 | 5 | 6 | 29 | 28 | +1 | 26 | |
| 7 | 1. FFV Erfurt (Note: 1. FFV Erfurt was granted voluntary demotion for financial reasons.) (R) | 18 | 5 | 4 | 9 | 21 | 38 | −17 | 19 | Relegation to Landesliga/Verbandsliga |
| 8 | 1. FC Neubrandenburg 04 | 18 | 4 | 2 | 12 | 27 | 44 | −17 | 14 | |
| 9 | Blau-Weiß Beelitz | 18 | 1 | 3 | 14 | 8 | 66 | −58 | 6 | |
| 10 | FSV Babelsberg 74 (R) | 18 | 0 | 2 | 16 | 7 | 77 | −70 | 2 | Relegation to Landesliga/Verbandsliga |
| 11 | FFV Leipzig (Note: FFV Leipzig withdrew its women's team after 16 games. All records were expunged.) (R) | 0 | 0 | 0 | 0 | 0 | 0 | 0 | 0 | Relegation to Landesliga/Verbandsliga |

Rules for classification: 1) Points; 2) Goal difference; 3) Goals scored
(C) Champions; (P) Promoted; (R) Relegated

=== Top scorers ===
As of 21 May 2017.

| Rank | Player | Club | Goals |
|---|---|---|---|
| 1 | (Germany) Anja Kähler | FC Viktoria 1889 Berlin | 22 |
| 2 | (Germany) Lavinia Timme | BSC Marzahn | 18 |
| 3 | (Germany) Manuela Knothe | Magdeburger FFC | 15 |
| 4 | (Poland) Marta Stodulska | BSC Marzahn | 14 |
| 5 | (Germany) Lea Krüger | 1. FC Neubrandenburg 04 | 11 |
| 5 | (Germany) Marie-Kristin von Carlsburg | FF USV Jena II | 11 |

== West ==
| Pos | Team | Pld | W | D | L | GF | GA | GD | Pts | Qualification or relegation |
|---|---|---|---|---|---|---|---|---|---|---|
| 1 | 1. FC Köln II (C, P) | 26 | 18 | 4 | 4 | 76 | 33 | +43 | 58 | Promotion to 2017–18 2. Bundesliga |
| 2 | SGS Essen II | 26 | 16 | 2 | 8 | 63 | 36 | +27 | 50 | |
| 3 | SC Fortuna Köln | 26 | 14 | 3 | 9 | 46 | 37 | +9 | 45 | |
| 4 | Borussia Bocholt | 26 | 14 | 3 | 9 | 59 | 59 | 0 | 45 | |
| 5 | Sportfreunde Uevekoven | 26 | 12 | 4 | 10 | 44 | 40 | +4 | 40 | |
| 6 | VfL Bochum | 26 | 11 | 6 | 9 | 63 | 40 | +23 | 39 | |
| 7 | Alemannia Aachen | 26 | 11 | 6 | 9 | 54 | 46 | +8 | 39 | |
| 8 | Bayer 04 Leverkusen II | 26 | 11 | 4 | 11 | 57 | 55 | +2 | 37 | |
| 9 | GSV Moers | 26 | 9 | 6 | 11 | 40 | 46 | −6 | 33 | |
| 10 | Warendorfer SU | 26 | 10 | 3 | 13 | 39 | 61 | −22 | 33 | |
| 11 | Germania Hauenhorst | 26 | 9 | 3 | 14 | 52 | 54 | −2 | 30 | |
| 12 | Borussia Mönchengladbach II | 26 | 7 | 7 | 12 | 52 | 60 | −8 | 28 | |
| 13 | Vorwärts Spoho Köln (R) | 26 | 6 | 4 | 16 | 49 | 79 | −30 | 22 | Relegation to Verbandsliga |
| 14 | MSV Duisburg II (R) | 26 | 6 | 1 | 19 | 22 | 70 | −48 | 19 | Relegation to Verbandsliga |

Rules for classification: 1) Points; 2) Goal difference; 3) Goals scored
(C) Champions; (P) Promoted; (R) Relegated

=== Top scorers ===
As of 28 May 2017.

| Rank | Player | Club | Goals |
|---|---|---|---|
| 1 | (Germany) Mandy Reinhardt | SGS Essen II | 21 |
| 2 | (Germany) Sonja Aha | Bayer Leverkusen II | 17 |
| 3 | (Germany) Sonja Maria Bartoschek | Alemannia Aachen | 16 |
| 3 | (Germany) Laura Montenbruck | GSV Moers | 16 |
| 3 | (Italy) Assunta Sarago | SC Fortuna Köln | 16 |
| 3 | (Germany) Nicole Schampera | Germania Hauenhorst | 16 |

== Southwest ==
| Pos | Team | Pld | W | D | L | GF | GA | GD | Pts | Qualification or relegation |
|---|---|---|---|---|---|---|---|---|---|---|
| 1 | SG Andernach (C, P) | 22 | 18 | 4 | 0 | 79 | 13 | +66 | 58 | Promotion to 2017–18 2. Bundesliga |
| 2 | SC 13 Bad Neuenahr | 22 | 11 | 7 | 4 | 40 | 31 | +9 | 40 | |
| 3 | TuS Issel | 22 | 11 | 5 | 6 | 45 | 23 | +22 | 38 | |
| 4 | 1. FC Saarbrücken II | 22 | 9 | 6 | 7 | 45 | 44 | +1 | 33 | |
| 5 | SC Siegelbach | 22 | 10 | 3 | 9 | 42 | 41 | +1 | 33 | |
| 6 | FC Speyer 09 | 22 | 9 | 6 | 7 | 44 | 44 | 0 | 33 | |
| 7 | TuS Wörrstadt | 22 | 9 | 4 | 9 | 45 | 38 | +7 | 31 | |
| 8 | FC Bitburg | 22 | 9 | 2 | 11 | 46 | 49 | −3 | 29 | |
| 9 | SV Dirmingen | 22 | 8 | 3 | 11 | 25 | 36 | −11 | 27 | |
| 10 | 1. FC Riegelsberg | 22 | 4 | 7 | 11 | 27 | 41 | −14 | 19 | |
| 11 | 1. FFC Montabaur | 22 | 5 | 3 | 14 | 20 | 46 | −26 | 18 | |
| 12 | SG Parr Medelsheim (R) | 22 | 3 | 2 | 17 | 32 | 84 | −52 | 11 | Relegation to Verbandsliga |

Rules for classification: 1) Points; 2) Goal difference; 3) Goals scored
(C) Champions; (P) Promoted; (R) Relegated

=== Top scorers ===
As of 21 May 2017.

| Rank | Player | Club | Goals |
|---|---|---|---|
| 1 | (Germany) Isabelle Stümper | SG Andernach | 26 |
| 2 | (France) Valerie Fogel | SG Parr Medelsheim | 22 |
| 3 | (Germany) Anne Blesius | TuS Issel | 16 |
| 4 | (Turkey) Yeşim Demirel | FC Speyer 09 | 13 |
| 4 | (Germany) Katharina Sternitzke | SG Andernach | 13 |

== South ==
| Pos | Team | Pld | W | D | L | GF | GA | GD | Pts | Qualification or relegation |
|---|---|---|---|---|---|---|---|---|---|---|
| 1 | SC Freiburg II (C, P) | 22 | 15 | 5 | 2 | 51 | 17 | +34 | 50 | Promotion to 2017–18 2. Bundesliga |
| 2 | SV Frauenbiburg | 22 | 13 | 6 | 3 | 44 | 14 | +30 | 45 | |
| 3 | FV Löchgau | 22 | 11 | 6 | 5 | 50 | 29 | +21 | 39 | |
| 4 | 1. FC Nürnberg | 22 | 10 | 5 | 7 | 36 | 34 | +2 | 35 | |
| 5 | SC Regensburg | 22 | 9 | 6 | 7 | 41 | 42 | −1 | 33 | |
| 6 | FC Ingolstadt 04 | 22 | 8 | 7 | 7 | 31 | 27 | +4 | 31 | |
| 7 | FFC Wacker München | 22 | 9 | 4 | 9 | 26 | 35 | −9 | 31 | |
| 8 | TSV Schwaben Augsburg | 22 | 7 | 5 | 10 | 39 | 40 | −1 | 26 | |
| 9 | ETSV Würzburg | 22 | 7 | 5 | 10 | 31 | 40 | −9 | 26 | |
| 10 | TSV Jahn Calden (R) | 22 | 5 | 5 | 12 | 32 | 49 | −17 | 20 | Relegation to Oberliga |
| 11 | FSV Hessen Wetzlar II (R) | 22 | 3 | 5 | 14 | 20 | 46 | −26 | 14 | Relegation to Oberliga |
| 12 | Hegauer FV (R) | 22 | 3 | 5 | 14 | 25 | 53 | −28 | 14 | Relegation to Oberliga |

Rules for classification: 1) Points; 2) Goal difference; 3) Goals scored
(C) Champions; (P) Promoted; (R) Relegated

=== Top scorers ===
As of 3 June 2017.

| Rank | Player | Club | Goals |
|---|---|---|---|
| 1 | (Germany) Tanja Arnold | FV Löchgau | 14 |
| 2 | (Germany) Mona Budnick | TSV Schwaben Augsburg | 13 |
| 2 | (Germany) Vanessa Ziegler | SC Freiburg II | 13 |
| 4 | (Germany) Anja Riebesecker | SV Frauenbiburg | 11 |
| 4 | (Germany) Daria Streng | SC Freiburg II | 11 |
| 6 | (Germany) Franziska Höllrigl | SV Frauenbiburg | 10 |
| 6 | (Germany) Marina Keilholz | SC Regensburg | 10 |
