= 2024–25 Frauen-Regionalliga Nord =

Frauen-Regionalliga Nord
- Season: 2024–25
- Dates: 1 September 2024 – 18 May 2025
- Matches: 132
- Goals: 488 (3.7 per match)
- Top goalscorer: (Germany) Jennifer Michel (18 goals)
- Biggest home win: VfL Wolfsburg 10–1 Eimsbütteler TV; 30 March 2025
- Biggest away win: Kieler MTV 0–7 FC St. Pauli; 22 September 2024; SV Meppen II 0–7 Hannover 96; 18 May 2025
- Highest scoring: VfL Wolfsburg 10–1 Eimsbütteler TV; 30 March 2025
- Longest winning run: 8 matches Holstein Kiel
- Longest unbeaten run: 11 matches Hamburger SV II
- Longest winless run: 11 matches Kieler MTV
- Longest losing run: 5 matches SV Meppen II; ATS Buntentor
- Highest attendance: 400; Holstein Kiel 2–0 FC St. Pauli; 27 October 2024; Holstein Kiel 0–2 Hamburger SV II; 10 November 2024
- Lowest attendance: 25; Kieler MTV 0–5 Hannover 96; 10 November 2024
- Attendance: 13,156 (100 per match)
- All statistics correct as of 18 May 2025.

The 2024–25 season of the Frauen-Regionalliga Nord was the 21st season of the top league of Northern German Football Association in women's football. The 2024–25 Regionalliga Nordost was one of the five regional leagues that serve as the third-tier of women's leagues in Germany.

The 2024–25 season began on 1 September 2024, and the final matchday took place on 18 May 2025.

== Teams ==
Locations of teams in the 2024–25 Frauen-Regionalliga Nord.

=== Team changes ===
Entering league		Exiting league	
Promoted from 2023 to 2024 lower-level leagues	Relegated from 2023–24 2. Bundesliga	Promoted to 2024–25 2. Bundesliga	Relegated to 2024–25 lower-level leagues
Eimsbütteler TV (from Oberliga Hamburg); Kieler MTV (from Oberliga Schleswig-Holstein as runner-up) (Note: TUS Schwachhausen, the champion of Verbandsliga Bremen and SSC Hagen Ahrensburg, the champion of Oberliga Schleswig-Holstein both refused to participate in the promotion tournament. The promotion spot should have therefore been determined between Eimsbütteler TV, the champion of Oberliga Hamburg and Kieler MTV, the runner-up of Oberliga Schleswig-Holstein. As both SV Hastenbeck, the champion of Oberliga Niedersachsen Ost and TSG 07 Burg Gretesch, the champion of Oberliga Niedersachsen West also refused promotion, however, both Eimsbütteler TV and Kieler MTV were promoted directly.)	VfL Wolfsburg II		FC Jesteburg-Bendestorf (to Oberliga Niedersachsen West); TuS Büppel (to Oberliga Niedersachsen West); Eintracht Braunschweig (to Oberliga Niedersachsen Ost)

=== Promotion from lower-level leagues ===
One promotion spot is determined in a play-off between The champions of Oberliga Niedersachsen Ost and Oberliga Niedersachsen West. The second promotion spot is determined in a round-robin tournament between the champions of Verbandsliga Bremen, Oberliga Hamburg and Oberliga Schleswig-Holstein. In case no team gets relegated to Regionalliga Nord from 2024–25 2. Bundesliga, an extra promotion spot is awarded in a play-off between the loser of the Oberliga Niedersachsen play-off and the runner-up in the round-robin tournament.

== Standings ==
Pos	Team	Pld	W	D	L	GF	GA	GD	Pts	Qualification or relegation
1	Hamburger SV II (Note: Reserve teams cannot compete at the same league level as the respective main team. Ineligible for promotion unless the main team earns promotion to Bundesliga. Hamburger SV II declined the right to promote to 2. Bundesliga.)	22	17	3	2	54	22	+32	54	
2	VfL Wolfsburg II (Note: Reserve teams cannot compete at the same league level as the respective main team. Ineligible for promotion if the main team gets relegated to 2. Bundesliga.) (P)	22	14	3	5	71	20	+51	45	Promotion to 2. Bundesliga
3	Holstein Kiel	22	14	2	6	48	37	+11	44	
4	SV Henstedt-Ulzburg	22	13	3	6	52	33	+19	42	
5	Hannover 96	22	9	4	9	53	30	+23	31	
6	FC St. Pauli	22	8	4	10	41	42	−1	28	
7	TSV Barmke	22	7	7	8	32	38	−6	28	
8	Werder Bremen II	22	6	6	10	24	40	−16	24	
9	Eimsbütteler TV	22	6	4	12	35	51	−16	22	
10	ATS Buntentor	22	6	4	12	36	57	−21	22	
11	SV Meppen II (R)	22	4	6	12	21	52	−31	18	Relegation to lower-level leagues
12	Kieler MTV (R)	22	3	4	15	21	66	−45	13	Relegation to lower-level leagues

Updated to match(es) played on 18 May 2025. Source: Fussball.de
Rules for classification: Tiebreakers
(P) Promoted; (R) Relegated

== Results ==
Home \ Away	BAR	BRB	BW2	HME	HMP	HS2	HNN	HEU	KIH	KIM	ME2	WO2
TSV Barmke		2–2	1–1	2–2	2–1	1–1	2–1	1–5	3–3	2–1	1–1	1–4
ATS Buntentor	1–0		1–4	2–2	3–2	2–4	2–2	0–2	5–2	4–3	3–1	0–4
Werder Bremen II	2–2	1–0		2–0	3–1	1–1	0–1	0–4	0–4	1–1	0–2	0–5
Eimsbütteler TV	0–2	1–0	0–1		0–3	1–4	3–1	3–1	4–5	4–0	3–4	1–0
FC St. Pauli	3–2	3–4	2–0	2–2		3–5	2–1	1–3	0–2	1–1	2–2	3–2
Hamburger SV II	1–0	6–2	2–1	1–0	0–0		4–0	3–1	4–1	5–2	1–0	2–1
Hannover 96	0–1	6–0	2–0	2–2	4–0	3–1		3–3	0–1	5–0	6–0	1–4
SV Henstedt-Ulzburg	2–1	4–2	2–4	3–1	4–0	1–3	1–0		2–2	4–0	2–0	0–0
Holstein Kiel	0–1	3–2	2–0	2–1	0–2	2–0	2–1	5–2		2–0	1–2	3–2
Kieler MTV	2–1	2–1	1–1	4–1	0–7	0–1	0–5	1–2	0–2		1–1	1–5
SV Meppen II	1–3	0–0	2–2	0–3	0–3	0–3	0–7	1–3	0–3	4–1		0–0
VfL Wolfsburg II	4–1	3–0	4–0	10–1	2–0	0–2	2–2	2–1	6–1	7–0	4–0	

Updated to match(es) played on 18 May 2025. Source: Fussball.de
Legend: Blue = home team win; Yellow = draw; Red = away team win.

== Top goalscorers ==
As of 18 May 2025

Rank	Player	Team	Goals
1	(Germany) Jennifer Michel	SV Henstedt-Ulzburg	18
2	(Germany) Bente Marie Bode	Hannover 96	11
3	(Germany) Hannah Östermann	Kieler MTV	10
4	(Germany) Mira Arouna	VfL Wolfsburg II	9
4	(Germany) Kira Hasse	Holstein Kiel	9
4	(Germany) Michelle Marie Hille	SV Henstedt-Ulzburg	9
4	(Germany) Vera Homp	SV Henstedt-Ulzburg	9
4	(Germany) Ronja Jürgensen	Holstein Kiel	9
4	(Germany) Maya Krieter	Eimsbütteler TV	9
4	(United States) Ebony Madrid	VfL Wolfsburg II	9
