= Doreen Meier =

German footballer and manager

Personal information
- Full name: Doreen Meier
- Date of birth: 9 November 1968 (age 57)
- Place of birth: Gera, East Germany
- Height: 1.68 m (5 ft 6 in)
- Position: Forward

Senior career*
Years	Team	Apps	(Gls)
- USV Jena
1996–2000	TSG Wilhelmshöhe		

International career
1990	East Germany	1	(0)

Managerial career
- 1996–2000: TSG Wilhelmshöhe
- 2003–2005: SC 07 Bad Neuenahr
- 2008: TuS Köln rrh.
- 2008–2012: Bayer Leverkusen
- * Club domestic league appearances and goals

Doreen Meier (born 9 November 1968) is a German former footballer and manager who played as a forward, appearing for the East Germany women's national team in their first and only match on 9 May 1990.

== Personal life ==
Meier was born in Gera, East Germany and was raised in Hermsdorf. She received her teaching degree for sports and history in Jena, and works as a teacher in a Cologne school.

== Career statistics ==
=== International ===
East Germany
Year	Apps	Goals
1990	1	0
Total	1	0
