= Isabelle Linden =

German footballer (born 1991)

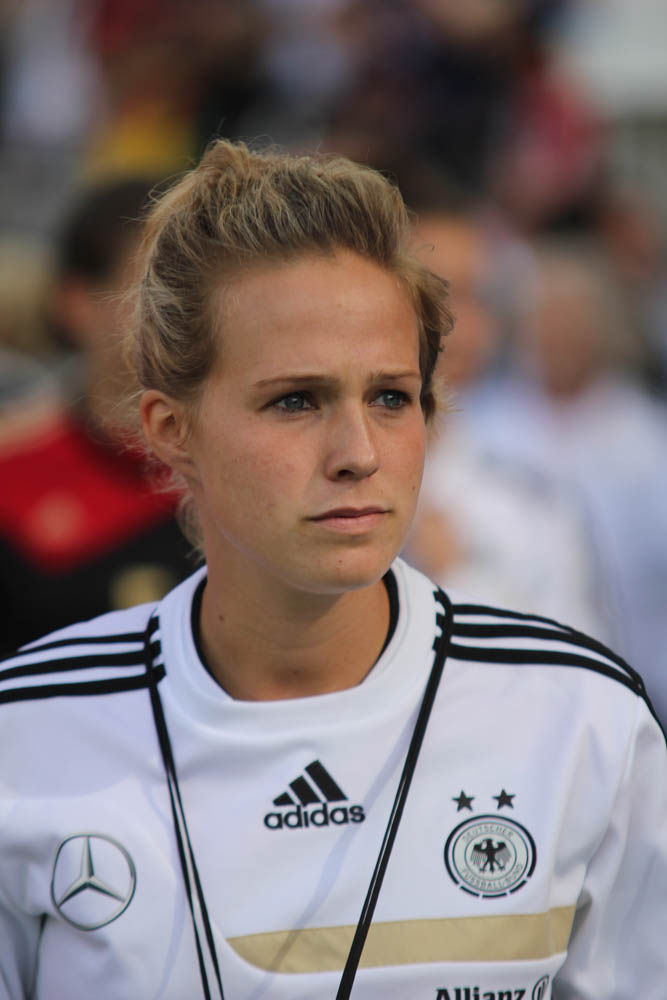
- Linden in 2013

Personal information
- Full name: Isabelle Linden
- Date of birth: 15 January 1991 (age 35)
- Place of birth: Köln, Germany
- Height: 1.65 m (5 ft 5 in)
- Position: Midfielder

Team information
- Current team: Ferencváros TC
- Number: 10

Youth career
- –2006: VfR Fischenich
- 2006–2007: SC Fortuna Köln

Senior career*
Years	Team	Apps	(Gls)
2007	SC Fortuna Köln	5	(3)
2008–2009	SGS Essen	23	(2)
2009–2015	Bayer 04 Leverkusen	66	(17)
2015–2016	1. FFC Frankfurt	13	(2)
2016–2018	Birmingham City	5	(1)
2018–2020	1. FC Köln	32	(3)
2021–	Ferencváros TC		

International career^{‡}
2005–2006	Germany U15	3	(0)
2007–2008	Germany U17	18	(2)
2009–2010	Germany U19	3	(0)
2012	Germany U23	1	(0)
2013	Germany	1	(0)
Medal record
Women's football
Representing Germany
UEFA Women's Championship
Gold medal – first place	2013 Sweden	Team
- * Club domestic league appearances and goals as of 22:06, 19 February 2019 (UTC) ‡ National team caps and goals as of 21 September 2013

Isabelle Linden (born 15 January 1991) is a German footballer. She plays as a midfielder for the Hungarian club Ferencváros TC. Former player of the German national team, she retired from professional football in 2020 before coming back from her retirement one year later.

== Club career ==
Isabelle Linden began her junior career at VfR Fischenich and SC Fortuna Köln before joining the senior team of SC Fortuna Köln. She played for SGS Essen before joining Fußball-Bundesliga side Bayer 04 Leverkusen in 2009. She moved to 1. FFC Frankfurt ahead of the 2015–16 season.

== International career ==
She was called up to be part of the national team for the UEFA Women's Euro 2013.

== Honors ==
=== International ===
- UEFA Women's Championship: Winner (1) 2013
- UEFA Women's Under-17 Championship: Winner 2008

== Personal life ==
Linden is one of the ambassadors for WePlayStrong, a women's football movement initiated by UEFA alongside Lisa Evans, Shanice van de Sanden and Eunice Beckmann. She is also openly gay.
