= Aylin Yaren =

Turkish-German female midfielder (born 1989)

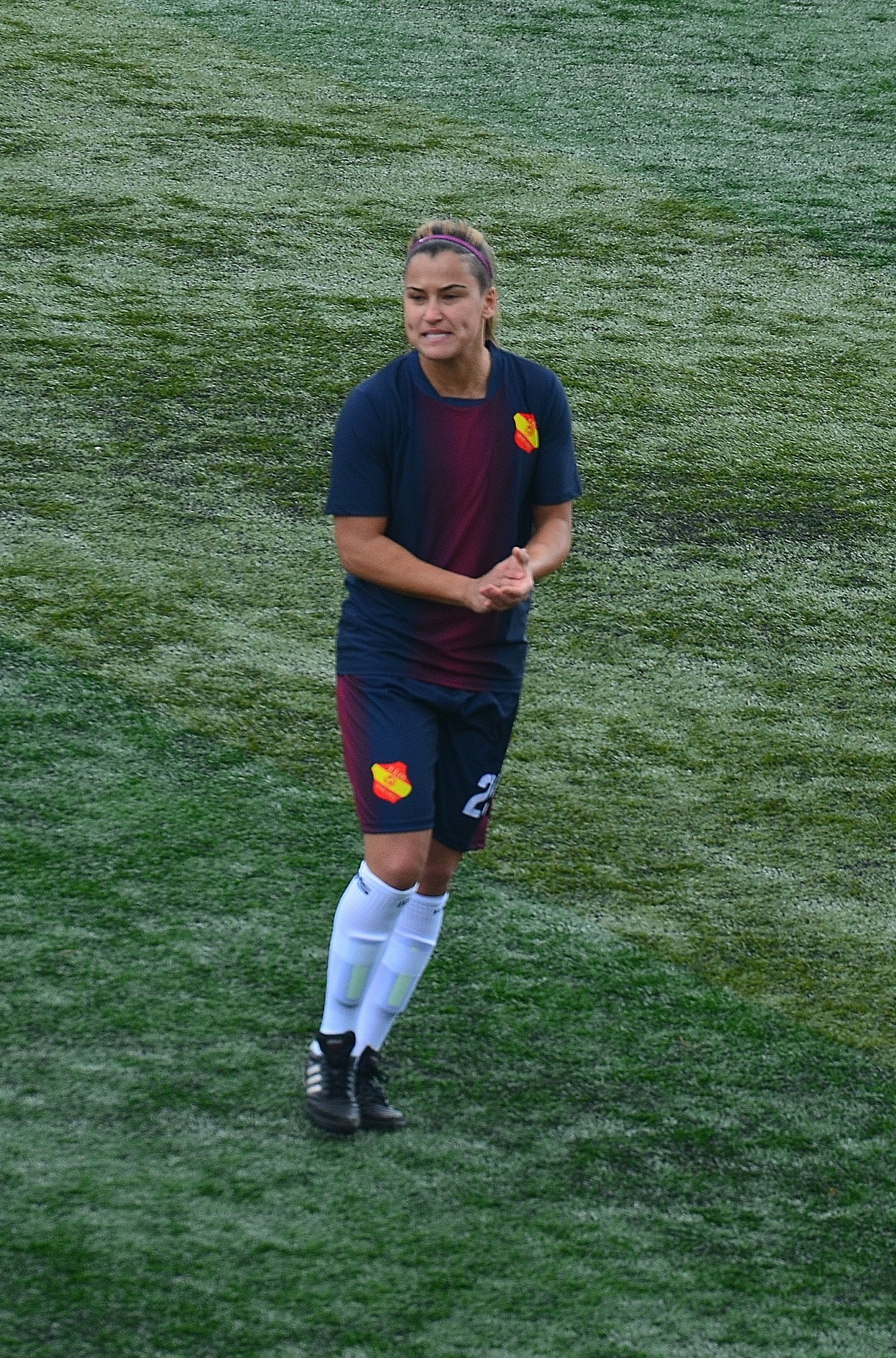
- Aylin Yaren playing for Trabzon İdmanocağı in the 2015–16 season

Personal information
- Date of birth: 30 August 1989 (age 37)
- Place of birth: Wedding, Berlin, Germany
- Height: 1.66 m (5 ft 5 in)
- Position: Midfielder

Team information
- Current team: Delay Sports Berlin

Youth career
- BFC Meteor 06
- VfB Hermsdorf

Senior career*
Years	Team	Apps	(Gls)
2009	LdB Malmö	11	(1)
2010	Tennis Borussia Berlin	7	(0)
2010–2012	1. FC Lübars	31	(11)
2012	Hamburger SV	10	(2)
2012–2013	SC 07 Bad Neuenahr	21	(0)
2013–2014	BV Cloppenburg	14	(0)
2014–2015	1. FC Lübars	30	(8)
2016	Trabzon İdmanocağı	6	(4)
2017	Arminia Bielefeld	6	(0)
2017–2018	SV Schott Jena	6	(0)
2018–2022	Türkiyemspor Berlin	55	(77)
2022–	Viktoria Berlin	67	(72)
2026–	Delay Sports Berlin	0	(0)

International career^{‡}
2005	Germany U-17	1	(1)
2006	Turkey U-17	1	(0)
2006–2007	Turkey U-19	11	(8)
2008–2015	Turkey	19	(10)
- * Club domestic league appearances and goals as of 12 July 2026 ‡ National team caps and goals as of October 25, 2015

Aylin Yaren (born 30 August 1989 in Berlin, Germany) is a Turkish-German midfielder, who currently plays for Delay Sports Berlin in Germany.

== Early life ==
Yaren was born to Turkish parents in Berlin, and grew up in Wedding and Reinickendorf. Her first football club was BFC Meteor 06. At school, she completed the Realschulabschluss.

== Playing career ==
=== Club ===
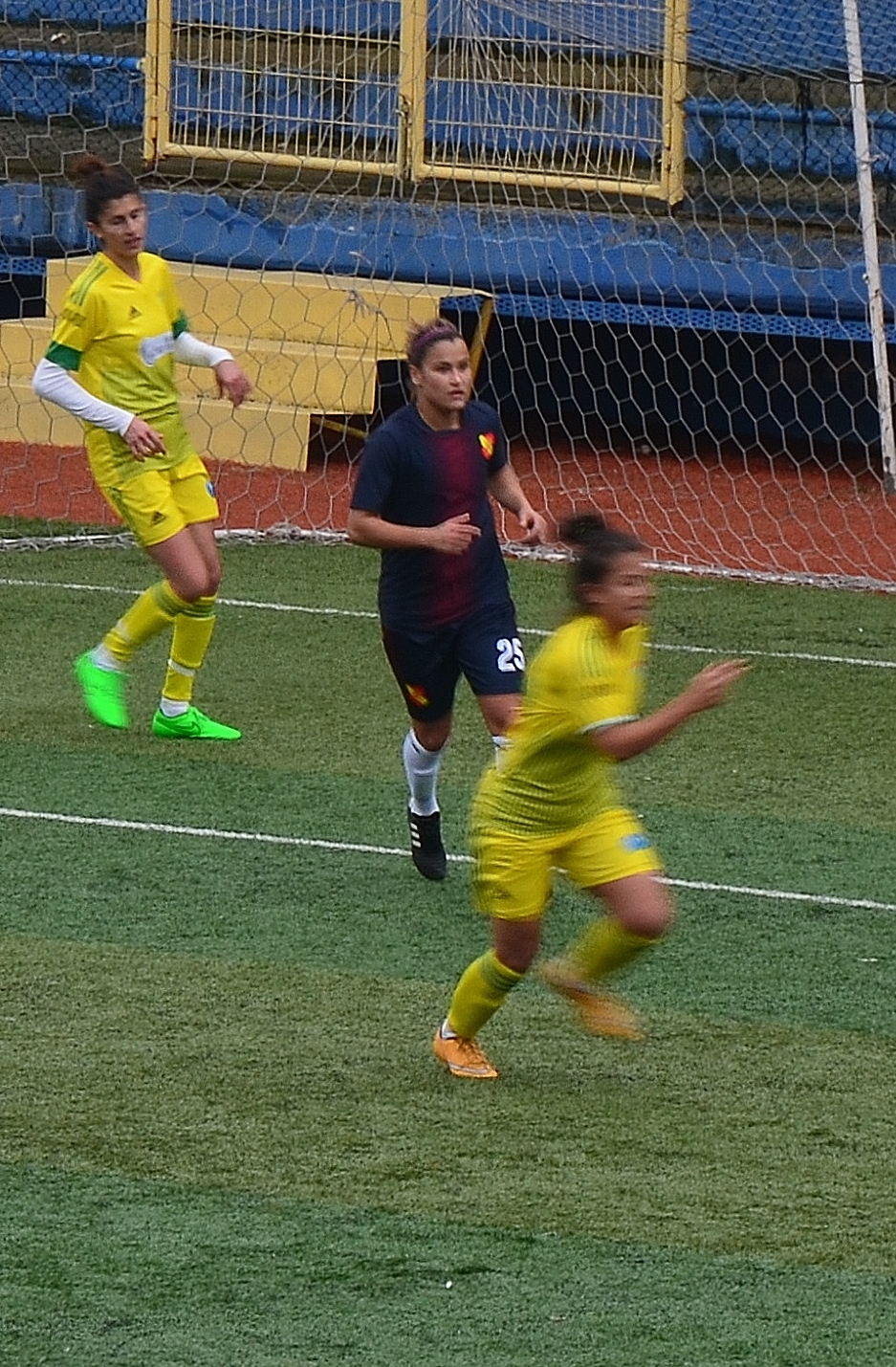
Yaren (middle) playing in the away match of Trabzon İdmanocağı against Kireçburnu Spor in the 2015–16 Turkish Women's First Football League

Yaren played in 2009 at the Swedish Damallsvenskan for LdB Malmö before she returned to Germany to join TeBe Berlin. She transferred from 1. FC Lübars to Hamburger SV at the beginning of 2012, and scored the opening goal in her debut against 1. FFC Turbine Potsdam.

In February 2016, Yaren moved to Turkey to play for Trabzon İdmanocağı in the Turkish First League.

In the 2016–17 season, she returned home, and joined Arminia Bielefeld to play in the 2. Bundesliga Nord. After sustaining an injury, she had to take a break upon advise of her physician.

=== International ===
Yaren made her debut for the Turkey women's national football team in a friendly match against Macedonia on 22 January 2006. She played in the Germany youth national and Turkey U-17 national, Turkey U-19 national teams.

International goals
Date	Venue	Opponent	Result	Competition	Scored
June 27, 2008	Paide linnastaadion Paide, Estonia	Estonia	6–0	UEFA Support International Tournament	1
June 29, 2008	Rakvere linnastaadion Rakvere, Estonia	Croatia	4–2	UEFA Support International Tournament	2

== In media and freestyle football shows ==
In 2007, she took part in the television show Torwandschießen (literally: goal wall shooting) of the German channel ZDF, where she won a type of penalty shootout with 4–3 against FC Bayern Munich's newly transferred French footballer Frank Ribery.

Yaren is practicing freestyle football by performing the art of self-expression with a football and exhibiting various tricks with her body. She learnt the art from videos on the internet, and she is training three to four hours a day.

She participated from 2010 to 2012 as contestant at episodes of the Turkey's Got Talent television show Yetenek Sizsiniz Türkiye demonstrating her art of freestyle football. In 2019, she participated at the German TV talent show Das Supertalent showing her football skills there.

Yaren was one of the two players, the other being Julia Simic, who gave freestyle football performances in the roadshow for the 2010 FIFA U-20 Women's World Cup. At the actions during the 2011 FIFA Women's World Cup held in Germany, she was invited to perform freestyle football shows again. In 2011, she gave between 50 and 60 performances.

She appears with her shows also at company events and Bundesliga stadiums in Berlin.

In an interview in 2011, she said that she have deliberately not played qualifying games for Turkey for many years in order to keep the possibility open of playing for the German national team. However, she did not receive a nomination by the German national coach. She played her first European Championship qualifying match for Turkey in 2015, whereby she ultimately become long-term bound by the Turkish football association.

== See also ==
- Freestyle football
- World Freestyle Football Association
