= Sarah Klotz =

Austrian association football player

Personal information
- Date of birth: March 1, 1998 (age 28)
- Place of birth: Dornbirn, Austria
- Position: Right back

Team information
- Current team: FC Viktoria 1889 Berlin

Sarah Klotz is an Austrian footballer who plays for the German side FC Viktoria 1889 Berlin.
