= Anett Viertel =

German footballer

Personal information
- Full name: Anett Viertel
- Date of birth: 16 October 1967 (age 59)
- Place of birth: East Germany
- Position: Goalkeeper

Senior career*
Years	Team	Apps	(Gls)
- BSG Rotation Schlema

International career
1990	East Germany	1	(0)
- * Club domestic league appearances and goals

Anett Viertel (born 16 October 1967) is a German former footballer who played as a goalkeeper, appearing for the East Germany women's national team in their first and only match on 9 May 1990.

== Career statistics ==
=== International ===
East Germany
Year	Apps	Goals
1990	1	0
Total	1	0
