= Arzu Karabulut =

German-born Turkish footballer (born 1991)

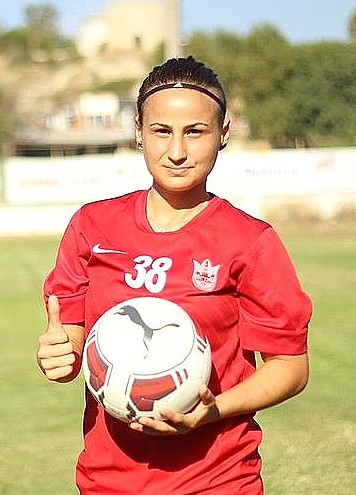
- Karabulut with Konak Belediyespor in 2014

Personal information
- Date of birth: 30 January 1991 (age 35)
- Place of birth: Cologne, Germany
- Position: Midfielder

Team information
- Current team: Fomget Gençlik ve Spor

Senior career*
Years	Team	Apps	(Gls)
2007–2010	Fortuna Köln	35	(17)
2010–2014	Bayer Leverkusen II	52	(26)
2014–2015	Konak Belediyespor	9	(2)
2015–2017	Trabzon İdmanocağı	40	(35)
2017–2018	Ataşehir Belediyespor	18	(8)
2018–2020	Beşiktaş J.K.	29	(11)
2020–2021	Fortuna Köln	29	(11)
2021–2022	Beşiktaş J.K.	23	(21)
2022–2024	ALG Spor	3	(1)
2024–2025	Galatasaray	37	(14)
2025–	Fomget Gençlik ve Spor	0	(0)

International career^{‡}
2006–2007	Turkey U-17	10	(4)
2006–2010	Turkey U-19	37	(6)
2011–	Turkey	59	(5)
- * Club domestic league appearances and goals as of 29 October 2022 ‡ National team caps and goals as of 9 September 2022

Arzu Karabulut (born 30 January 1991) is a German-born Turkish women's football midfielder who plays in the Turkish Super League for Fomget Gençlik ve Spor, and the Turkey women's national team.

== Personal life ==
Arzu Karabulut was born on 30 January 1991 in Cologne to Turkish parents Esef and Kevser, who immigrated to Germany in 1977. She has three older brothers.

She became interested in playing football early in her childhood and, at the age of four, joined her three brothers who were in football already. She was supported by her parents, who told her, however, the education must always have priority. At the age of fourteen, she was called up for training in the Turkey women's under 19 national team, as there was no U-17 national team in Turkey at the time; German Football Association coach Bettina Wiegmann had her sights on her as well, but she chose the national team of her parents' native country.

After completing her secondary education with a "Fachabitur", she began a two-year trainee program, which will last until 2014, as a tax expert assistant in her brother Irfan's office.

Karabulut has stated that she is a great fan of Lionel Messi. She said in a newspaper interview that she even straightens her curly hair for her admiration.

== Club career ==
Karabulu entered SC Fortuna Köln at the age of ten, and ran through the youth teams. She played from 2007 to 2010 in the Cologne-based club, competing in the Regionalliga. In the summer of 2010, she transferred to Bayer 04 Leverkusen II, a rival team in the league. She is a regular team member since then.

She made her debut in the Frauen-Bundesliga playing in the first team of her club in the match against FF USV Jena on 27 November 2011.

In July 2014, she transferred from Bayer 04 Leverkusen II in Germany, where she scored 26 goals in 52 games of the last three seasons, to Konak Belediyespor in İzmir, Turkey.

Arzu Karabulut transferred to Trabzon İdmanocağı after playing nine games and scoring two goals in the 2014–15 season with Konak Belediyespor. She scored already seven goals in the first match of the league's 2015–16 season, which ended 19–0 for her new team. She finished the 2015–16 season as "Top scorer" with 23 goals netted in 17 league matches.

=== Ataşehir Belediyespor ===
By October 2017, she transferred to the Istanbul-based club Ataşehir Belediyespor.

=== Beşiktaş ===
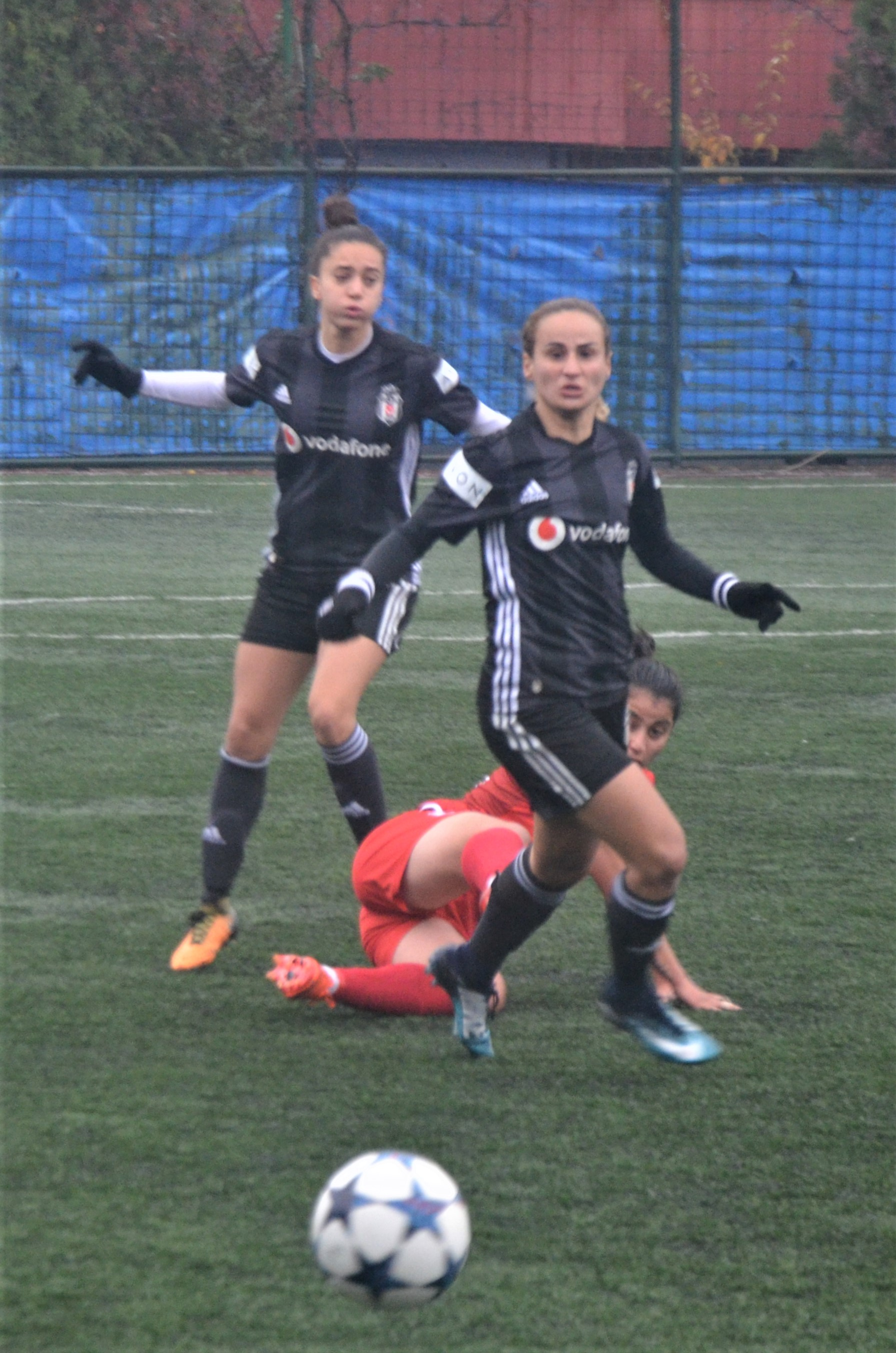
Arzu Karabulut (right) of Beşiktaş J.K. in the 2018–19 Women's First League season

In the 2018–19 league season, she transferred to Beşiktaş J.K. She enjoyed the champion title of her team in the 2018–19 season. She took part at the 2019–20 UEFA Women's Champions League - Group 9 matches.

=== Return to Fortuna Köln ===
Karabulut returned to her former club SC Fortuna Köln in her birthplace Cologne, Germany on 9 October 2020.

=== Return to Beşiktaş ===
She went to Turkey again, and joined Beşiktaş J.K. in the 2020-21 Turkcell Women's Football League season. She enjoyed her team's champions title, and played in two matches of the 2021–22 UEFA Women's Champions League qualifying rounds scoring one goal. In October 2021, she suffered a nasal fracture during a friendly match before the 2021-22 Turkcell Super League, and had to underwent an operation.

=== ALG Spor ===
On 23 July 2022, she transferred to the Gaziantep-based league champion club ALG Spor. She played for her new team in the 2022–23 UEFA Women's Champions League on 18 August 2022.

=== Galatasaray ===
She signed a contract with Galatasaray on 19 January 2024.

In the statement made by Galatasaray club on July 20, 2025, it was said that we thank you for your efforts and wish you success in your future careers.

== International career ==
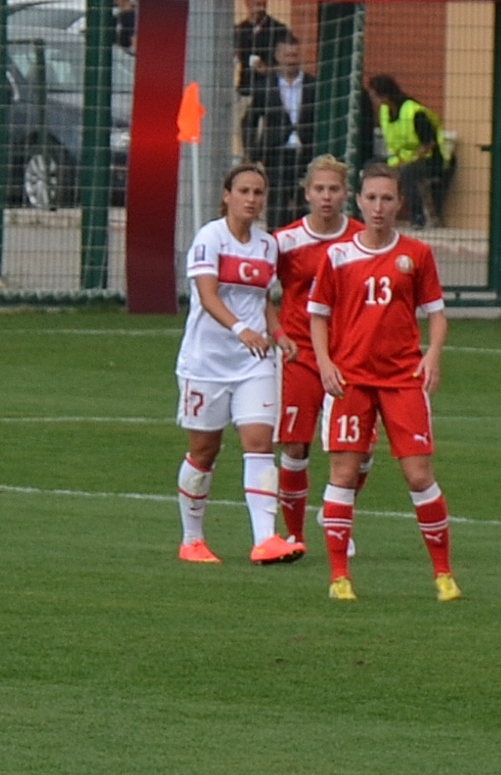
Arzu Karabulut (white) in the 2015 FIFA Women's World Cup qualification match against Belarus

Between 2006 and 2007, Karabulut capped eleven times for the Turkey girls' under 17 national team, amongst others in the qualifications for the 2008 UEFA Women's U-17 Championship. She scored three goals with the Turkey U-17 national team, all in friendly matches.

Already in the beginning of 2006, she debuted in the Turkey women's U-19 national team. Karabulut went on to appear in 39 international matches until 2010, and netted seven goals for the U-19 national team.

Finally, she made her debut in the Turkey women's national team in the UEFA Women's Euro 2013 qualifying – Group 2 match against the Romanian side on 23 November 2011. She took part in the 2015 FIFA Women's World Cup qualification – UEFA Group 6 match first time against Montenegro on 28 November 2013. She scored her team's honor goal in the match against the women from Wales that ended with 1–5.

== Career statistics ==
=== Club ===
As of match played 29 October 2022

Appearances and goals by club, season and competition
Club	Season	League			Continental		National		Total	
Club	Season	Division	Apps	Goals	Apps	Goals	Apps	Goals	Apps	Goals
SC Fortuna Köln, Bayer 04 Leverkusen II	2006–2014		87	43	–		55	11	142	54
Konak Belediyespor	2014–15	First League	9	2	–		4	2	13	4
Trabzon İdmanocağı	2015–16	First League	17	23	–		6	0	23	23
Trabzon İdmanocağı	2016–17	First League	23	12	–		0	0	23	12
Trabzon İdmanocağı	Total		40	35	0	0	6	0	46	35
Ataşehir Belediyespor	2017–18	First League	18	8	–		3	1	21	9
Beşiktaş J.K.	2018–19	First League	14	6	–		6	0	20	6
Beşiktaş J.K.	2019–20	First League	15	5	2	0	5	0	22	5
Beşiktaş J.K.	Total		29	11	2	0	11	0	42	11
Fortuna Köln	2020–21	Frauen-Mittlrheinliga	29	11	–		2	0	31	11
Beşiktaş J.K.	2020–21	First League	6	2	–		1	0	7	2
Beşiktaş J.K.	2021–22	Super League	23	21	2	1	2	1	27	23
Beşiktaş J.K.	Total		29	23	2	1	3	1	34	25
ALG Spor	2022-23	Super League	3	1	1	0	2	0	6	1
Career total			244	134	5	1	86	15	335	150

=== International ===
International goals
Date	Venue	Opponent	Competition	Result	Scored
Turkey women's national football team
4 April 2014	Eskişehir Atatürk Stadium Eskişehir, Turkey	Wales	2015 FIFA Women's World Cup qualification – UEFA Group 6	L 1–5	1
24 February 2015	Rize Atatürk Stadium Rize, Turkey	Georgia	Friendly	W 4–2	1
26 February 2015	Hüseyin Avni Aker Stadium Trabzon, Turkey	Georgia	Friendly	W 6–0	1
4 April 2018	TFF Riva Facility Istanbul, Turkey	Estonia	Friendly	W 3–2	1
14 June 2021	TFF Riva Facility Istanbul, Turkey	Bulgaria	Friendly	W 3–1	1
27 October 2023	Stade Émile Mayrisch, Esch-sur-Alzette, Luxembourg	Luxembourg	2023–24 UEFA Women's Nations League C	W 4–0	1
3 March 2026	Pendik Stadium, Istanbul, Turkey	Malta	2027 FIFA Women's World Cup qualification – UEFA League B	W 3–0	1

== Honours ==
Turkish Women's First League

Konak Belediyespor
Winners (1): 2014–15

Trabzon idmanocağı
Third places (1): 2015–16

Ataşehir Belediyespor
Winners (1): 2017–18

Beşiktaş J.K.
Winners (2): 2018–19, 2020–21

Galatasaray
Winners (1): 2023–24

Individual

Top scorer (1): 2015–16 (23 goals)
