= Dana Krumbiegel =

German footballer

Personal information
- Full name: Dana Krumbiegel
- Date of birth: 22 November 1969 (age 56)
- Place of birth: East Germany
- Position: Forward

Senior career*
Years	Team	Apps	(Gls)
- Wismut Karl-Marx-Stadt
- 1. FFC Fortuna Dresden
- TKV Flöha/Plaue

International career
1990	East Germany	1	(0)
- * Club domestic league appearances and goals

Dana Krumbiegel (born 22 November 1969) is a German former footballer who played as a forward, appearing for the East Germany women's national team in their first and only match on 9 May 1990.

== Career statistics ==
=== International ===
East Germany
Year	Apps	Goals
1990	1	0
Total	1	0
