= Heike Hoffmann =

German footballer

Personal information
- Full name: Heike Hoffmann
- Date of birth: 7 September 1963 (age 63)
- Place of birth: East Germany
- Position: Defender

Senior career*
Years	Team	Apps	(Gls)
1982–	Turbine Potsdam		
–2015	SV Rot-Weiß Flatow		

International career
1990	East Germany	1	(0)
- * Club domestic league appearances and goals

Heike Hoffmann (born 7 September 1963) is a German former footballer who played as a defender, appearing for the East Germany women's national team in their first and only match on 9 May 1990.

== Career statistics ==
East Germany
Year	Apps	Goals
1990	1	0
Total	1	0
