= Michèle Tschudin =

Swiss footballer (born 2000)

Personal information
- Full name: Michèle Eliane Tschudin
- Date of birth: 25 December 2000 (age 25)
- Place of birth: Thun, Switzerland
- Position: Goalkeeper

Team information
- Current team: Viktoria Berlin
- Number: 99

Youth career
- 2008–2015: Wattenwil
- 2015–2019: BSC Young Boys

Senior career*
| Years | Team | Apps | (Gls) |
| 2018–2019 | BSC Young Boys | 5 | (0) |
| 2019–2024 | Basel | 65 | (0) |
| 2024– | Viktoria Berlin | | |

International career^{‡}
| 2018–2019 | Switzerland U19 | 2 | (0) |
- * Club domestic league appearances and goals as of 24 February 2024 ‡ National team caps and goals as of 24 February 2024

Michèle Tschudin (born 25 December 2000) is a Swiss footballer who plays as a goalkeeper for German club Viktoria Berlin.

== Career ==
=== Club ===
Michèle Tschudin made her senior debut for BSC Young Boys on 10 March 2019 against Servette in a 5–1 defeat. She made 5 appearances in total for the club and conceded 15 goals.

On 27 July 2019, she joined Basel. She made her debut on September 7 in a 5–3 win over St. Gallen. In 2019/20, she made 5 appearances and conceded 9 goals. In 2020–21, she became the main goalkeeper for the club, standing between the sticks 21 times as she conceded 32 goals and kept 5 clean sheets.

=== International ===
Tschudin has made two appearances for the Swiss U19 team in the 2019 UEFA Women's Under-19 Championship qualification. She kept a clean sheet in a 3–0 win over Azerbaijan and she came on from the bench at halftime in a 2–2 draw against Finland.
