= Petra Weschenfelder =

German footballer

Personal information
- Full name: Petra Weschenfelder
- Date of birth: 22 April 1964 (age 62)
- Place of birth: East Germany
- Position: Defender

Senior career*
Years	Team	Apps	(Gls)
- USV Jena

International career
1990	East Germany	1	(0)
- * Club domestic league appearances and goals

Petra Weschenfelder (born 22 April 1964) is a German former footballer who played as a defender, appearing for the East Germany women's national team in their first and only match on 9 May 1990.

== Career statistics ==
=== International ===
East Germany
Year	Apps	Goals
1990	1	0
Total	1	0
