= Carmen Weiß =

German association football player

Personal information
- Full name: Carmen Weiß
- Date of birth: 1 March 1968 (age 58)
- Place of birth: East Germany
- Position: Midfielder

Senior career*
Years	Team	Apps	(Gls)
- BSG Wismut Karl-Marx-Stadt

International career
1990	East Germany	1	(0)
- * Club domestic league appearances and goals

Carmen Weiß (born 1 March 1968) is a German former footballer who played as a midfielder, appearing for the East Germany women's national team in their first and only match on 9 May 1990.

== Career statistics ==
=== International ===
East Germany
Year	Apps	Goals
1990	1	0
Total	1	0
