= Rachel Rinast =

Swiss footballer (born 1991)

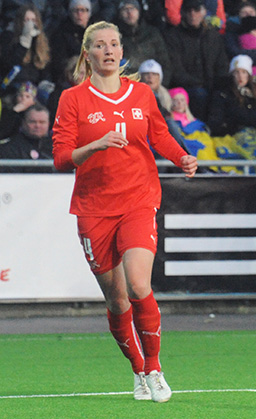
- Rinast in 2015

Personal information
- Full name: Rachel Miriam Marcia Free Rinast
- Date of birth: 2 June 1991 (age 35)
- Place of birth: Bad Segeberg, Germany
- Height: 1.76 m (5 ft 9 in)
- Position: Defender

Team information
- Current team: St. Pauli
- Number: 31

Senior career*
Years	Team	Apps	(Gls)
–2008	FFC Oldesloe 2000		
2008–2009	TSV Nahe		
2009–2010	Holstein Kiel	19	(0)
2010–2012	1. FC Köln	45	(5)
2012–2013	SC 07 Bad Neuenahr	18	(0)
2013–2016	1. FC Köln	69	(9)
2016–2017	Bayer Leverkusen	24	(1)
2017–2018	FC Basel	30	(12)
2018–2019	SC Freiburg	6	(0)
2019	ASA Tel Aviv	12	(5)
2019–2022	1. FC Köln	61	(4)
2022–2023	Grasshoppers	23	(3)
2023–	St. Pauli	12	(1)

International career
2015–2023	Switzerland	48	(3)
- * Club domestic league appearances and goals as of 5 May 2024

Rachel Miriam Marcia Free Rinast (born 2 June 1991) is a Swiss footballer who plays as a defender for German club St. Pauli. Born in Germany, she represented the Switzerland national team internationally.

== Club career ==
Rinast began her senior career at FFC Oldesloe 2000 before moving to TSV Nahe in 2008. She then played for Holstein Kiel, 1. FC Köln and SC 07 Bad Neuenahr.

In 2013, she returned to 1. FC Köln, winning her first title in the 2014–15 2. Bundesliga. In 2016, she joined Bayer Leverkusen, and later moved to Swiss club FC Basel.

Her career continued with SC Freiburg, and Israeli side ASA Tel Aviv in 2019, where she won the domestic double. That same year, she returned to 1. FC Köln, in which she achieved another 2. Bundesliga title in 2020–21, before joining Swiss club Grasshoppers in 2022. In 2023, she signed with Regionalliga side St. Pauli.

== International career ==
Since her debut at the 2015 Algarve Cup, she has been a member of the Swiss national team. She was playing in the German second division for Köln, when Swiss selectors discovered her mother was from St. Gallen and called her up. Rinast is also a singer and in 2014 provided guest vocals on Grau by German rapper DANGA.

== Honours ==
Köln

- 2. Frauen-Bundesliga (2): 2014–15, 2020–21

Basel

- Swiss Super League; runner-up: 2017–18

Tel Aviv

- Ligat Nashim (1): 2018–19
- Israeli Cup (1): 2018–19
