= Kathrin Hecker =

German footballer

Personal information
- Full name: Kathrin Hecker
- Date of birth: 11 July 1963 (age 63)
- Place of birth: East Germany
- Position: Defender

Senior career*
Years	Team	Apps	(Gls)
1989–1990	BSG Rotation Schlema		

International career
1990	East Germany	1	(0)
- * Club domestic league appearances and goals

Kathrin Hecker (born 11 July 1963) is a German former footballer who played as a defender, appearing for the East Germany national team in their first and only match on 9 May 1990.

== Career ==
=== Clubs ===
Hecker, who grew up in Lößnitz, played for the BSG Rotation Schlema, the reigning champion in football in the GDR, in the 1989/90 season.

After reunification, she came to Wolfsburg, where she played for VfL Wolfsburg.

=== National team ===
Hecker took part in the only international match of the GDR national team. They were beaten 3–0 on May 9, 1990, in the Karl Liebknecht Stadium in Potsdam's Babelsberg district against the Czechoslovakia national team in front of about 800 spectators.

=== International ===
East Germany
Year	Apps	Goals
1990	1	0
Total	1	0

== Literature ==
- Women's football from A - Z: The encyclopedia of German women's football - by Ronny Galczynski ISBN 978-3-86910-169-9
