= Hannover 96 (women) =

- Ground: Hannover 96 Akademie, Platz 4
- Manager: Kevin Martin
- League: Regionalliga Nord
- 2024–25: 5th
- Website: hannover96-frauenfussball.de

Hannover 96 is a women's association football club from Hannover, Germany. It is part of the Hannover 96 club.

== History ==
Hannover 96 established its women's football department in the early 2000s, with competitive activity recorded as early as the 2005–06 season in the Bezirksliga.

After years of building a strong foundation, the first team achieved a major breakthrough in 2018, earning promotion to the fourth-tier Oberliga Niedersachsen. That same year, Hannover 96 celebrated a significant triumph by winning the Niedersachsenpokal, defeating VfL Jesteburg 2–0 in the final. Their success earned them a spot in the 2018–19 DFB-Pokal, where they defeated Regionalligist Blau-Weiß Hohen Neuendorf 4–2 in the first round. However, they faced a heavy 0–11 loss against the reigning champions VfL Wolfsburg in the second round.

In the 2018–19 season, Hannover 96 secured the Niedersachsen championship after a convincing 3–0 victory over Blau-Weiß Hollage in the final, which led to their promotion to the Regionalliga Nord. In their debut Regionalliga season, Hannover 96 performed impressively, finishing as runners-up behind SV Henstedt-Ulzburg. Despite their strong showing, both clubs opted not to move up to the 2. Frauen-Bundesliga due to financial constraints.

== Squad ==
As of 23 March 2026

Note: Flags indicate national team as defined under FIFA eligibility rules; some limited exceptions apply. Players may hold more than one non-FIFA nationality.

No.	Pos.	Nation	Player
1	GK	GER	Leah Bungeroth
2	DF	GER	Mathea König
3	DF	GER	Amelie König
4	DF	GER	Louisa König
5	DF	GER	Svea Rittmeier
6	MF	GER	Lena Rathmann (captain)
8	FW	GER	Lara Theobald
9	FW	GER	Vivian Dastgerdi
10	MF	GER	Franziska Haeckel
11	MF	GRE	Alexia Mikrouli
13	FW	GER	Julia Dose
15	FW	GER	Olivia Lee
16	FW	GER	Nele Obara
17	MF	KOS	Erisa Popaj

No.	Pos.	Nation	Player
17	DF	GER	Enna Surburg
18	FW	GER	Anna-Lena Füllkrug
19	DF	GER	Lina Seifert
20	MF	GER	Leonie Dombrowa
22	DF	KOS	Dea Stublla
23	DF	GER	Paula Meyer
24	MF	GER	Mia Seliger
25	DF	GER	Juliane Grimm
26	DF	GER	Junia Sass
27	MF	GER	Leticia Cordes
28	MF	GER	Miki Filipovic
29	DF	GER	Jana Menger
30	GK	GER	Chantal Angersbach
33	GK	GER	Paula Schilling

== Current staff ==
As of 23 March 2026

Coaching staff
(Germany) Kevin Martin	Head coach
(Germany) Sven Sosnowski	Assistant coach
(Germany) Melina Martin	Assistant coach
(Greece) Anastasia Mikrouli	Supervisor
(Germany) Johanna Schellhase	Physiotherapist
