= FC Hansa Rostock (women) =

- Full name: Fußballclub Hansa Rostock e. V.
- Founded: 1991; 34 years ago
- Ground: Volksstadion Rostock
- Capacity: 8,000
- Manager: Tino Spörk
- League: Regionalliga Nordost
- 2024–25: 11th
Home colours	Away colours	Third colours

FC Hansa Rostock is a women's association football club based in Rostock, Germany. The club play in the Regionalliga Nordost and is part of FC Hansa Rostock.

== History ==
=== Pre-establishment ===
The first women's football team in Rostock was established in January 1970, initiated by Marion Bialas, daughter of former Empor Rostock player Franz Bialas, and Hansa youth coach Jupp Pilz. Renate Wenzel and Victoria Proft were also key figures in its founding. An announcement in the Norddeutsche Neueste Nachrichten attracted 100 applicants, of which 40 were selected. The team was organized under BSG Post Rostock and became one of the strongest in DDR women's football, winning the final DDR Championship and Cup in 1990.

=== Founding ===
Following German reunification, BSG Post Rostock was dissolved. In 1991, the team joined FC Hansa Rostock to preserve women's football in the city. Under Hansa, the team won the Mecklenburg-Vorpommern Landespokal in 1992 and 1993 under coach Manfred Draheim with well-known players including Katrin Baaske, Sybille Lange, Katrin Prühs and Jennifer Zietz.

=== Decline ===
In 1993, financial difficulties led to the transfer of the women’s team to PSV Rostock. They played briefly in the Frauen-Bundesliga during the 1995–96 season but achieved limited success. In 2005, the team joined SV Hafen Rostock 61, eventually ceasing operations in 2018.

=== Revival ===
In 2023, FC Hansa Rostock reintroduced a women’s football division. The team debuted in the 2023–24 Mecklenburg-Vorpommern Verbandsliga, in which they managed to win the Mecklenburg-Vorpommern Landespokal on May 1, 2024, qualifying for the DFB-Pokal. In addition, they finished their unbeaten season as league champions, and securing promotion to the Regionalliga Nordost after a 3–1 victory on aggregate over SSV Besiegdas Magdeburg in the promotion play-offs.

== Squad ==
As of 20 January 2025

Note: Flags indicate national team as defined under FIFA eligibility rules; some limited exceptions apply. Players may hold more than one non-FIFA nationality.

No.	Pos.	Nation	Player
1	GK	(Germany) GER	Merle Hellwig
2	DF	(Sweden) SWE	Hanna Neselius
3	DF	(Germany) GER	Ria Pein
4	DF	(Germany) GER	Lisa Schröder
6	MF	(Germany) GER	Laurentia Köhler
7	FW	(Germany) GER	Julia Heinschel
8	DF	(Germany) GER	Nele Mohr
9	FW	(Germany) GER	Neele Trepte
10	DF	(Germany) GER	Sarah Tägtmeier
11	MF	(Germany) GER	Mette Bönsch
12	GK	(Germany) GER	Lara Mariuta-Schukat

No.	Pos.	Nation	Player
13	FW	(Germany) GER	Vanessa Rist
14	MF	(Germany) GER	Malin Drockner
15	MF	(Germany) GER	Lara Montzki
16	MF	(Germany) GER	Jette Schramm
17	MF	(Germany) GER	Julia Hesse
18	FW	(Germany) GER	Celine Hanto
19	MF	(Germany) GER	Ronja Weißgärber
20	MF	(Germany) GER	Loretta Kung
21	MF	(Germany) GER	Johanna Silbe
22	MF	(Germany) GER	Jenny Le Quoc
–	DF	(Germany) GER	Vivien Knappe
–	FW	(Germany) GER	Elly Böttcher
