= VfR Warbeyen =

German football club

- Full name: Verein für Rasenspiele Schwarz-Weiß Warbeyen 1945 e. V.
- Founded: 1945
- Ground: Bresserbergstadion
- Capacity: 6,000
- 1st Chairman: Christian Nitsch
- Head coach: Sandro Scuderi
- League: 2. Bundesliga
- 2025–26: 2. Bundesliga, 14th of 14 (relegated)
- Website: vfr-warbeyen.de
Home colours	Away colours

The VfR Warbeyen (officially Verein für Rasenspiele Schwarz-Weiß Warbeyen 1945 e. V.) is a German association football club from the town of Kleve, North Rhine-Westphalia. Its women's team will play in the 2. Bundesliga from the 2025–26 season onwards.

== History ==
Having played in the Landesliga throughout the 2000s and 2010s, Warbeyen's women's team won promotion to the fourth-tier Niederrheinliga in 2018. After an eighth place in 2019, the team was crowned as Niederrheinliga champions in 2020 on a points-per-game basis, as the season was cancelled due to the COVID-19 pandemic - with Warbeyen having sat third on points with two games in hand.

In 2021–22, Warbeyen won the Niederrheinpokal and thereby qualified for the 2022–23 DFB-Pokal. They were beaten 1:2 by Borussia Bocholt during the first round. Having finished third and second in the preceding seasons of the Regionalliga West, Warbeyen played a dominant season in 2024–25, winning promotion four matches in advance. Their title-winning season, one which earned them their maiden promotion to the 2. Bundesliga, ended on a controversial note: head coach Sandro Scuderi and his coaching team had decided to announce during a training session in the week of their title-clinching match against Bayer Leverkusen II that eight players, including captain Pauline Dallmann, her sister Jule, and top goalscorer Jolina Opladen would not be included in the club's plans going into the 2025–26 season. This led to the players initially forming up in two separate groups following the Leverkusen game, before eventually being convinced into taking a group photo.

During their maiden campaign in the 2. Frauen-Bundesliga, Warbeyen finished 14th and last, having scored a single win against FC Ingolstadt on matchday 16.

== Squad ==
Note: Flags indicate national team as defined under FIFA eligibility rules; some limited exceptions apply. Players may hold more than one non-FIFA nationality.

No.	Pos.	Nation	Player
1	GK	NED	Ilse van Rheenen
2	DF	NED	Isa Hoevers
3	DF	NED	Ebla Gouriye
4	DF	AUT	Giulia Bauer
6	DF	GER	Gloria Zarambaud
5	MF	MAR	Narjiss Ahamad
7	FW	GER	Gizem Kilic
8	MF	MLT	Jana Barbara
9	FW	NED	Aida Manoukian
10	MF	NED	Lotte Masseling
11	MF	GER	Greta Oerding
12	GK	GER	Lea Egbers
14	DF	GER	Joyce Angenent

No.	Pos.	Nation	Player
15	FW	NED	Lisa van der Linde
16	FW	GER	Lidia Nduka
17	MF	GER	Jule Laufer
18	MF	NED	Moisa Verkuijl
19	MF	GER	Emily-Marie Guyens
20	DF	NED	Mariken Kroon
21	FW	NED	Carolina Wolters
22	FW	NED	Marit Cleven
23	GK	GER	Cilly Plaßmann
24	FW	KOS	Loreta Lulaj
25	DF	NED	Yaël Mollink
—	MF	GER	Rahel Lang
—	MF	CZE	Kristyna Sivakova
—	GK	USA	Elena Milam
—	DF	USA	Lilly Yordy
—	MF	USA	Hayley Ann Howard

== Honours ==
The club's honours:

=== Women's ===
==== League ====
- Regionalliga West (III)
  - Champions: 2025
- Niederrheinliga (IV)
  - Champions: 2020
- Landesliga Niederrhein (V)
  - Champions: 2018

==== Cup ====
- Niederrheinpokal
  - Winners: 2022

== Recent seasons ==
The recent season-by-season performance of the club:

=== Women's ===
Season	Division	Tier	Position
2003–04	Landesliga Niederrhein, Gruppe 3	V	7th
2004–05	Landesliga Niederrhein, Gruppe 3	V	7th
2005–06	Landesliga Niederrhein, Gruppe 3	V	3rd
2006–07	Landesliga Niederrhein, Gruppe 2	V	5th
2007–08	Landesliga Niederrhein, Gruppe 2	V	4th
2008–09	Landesliga Niederrhein, Gruppe 2	V	9th
2009–10	Landesliga Niederrhein, Gruppe 2	V	8th
2010–11	Landesliga Niederrhein, Gruppe 2	V	2nd
2011–12	Landesliga Niederrhein, Gruppe 2	V	7th
2012–13	Landesliga Niederrhein, Gruppe 2	V	3rd
2013–14	Landesliga Niederrhein, Gruppe 1	V	3rd
2014–15	Landesliga Niederrhein, Gruppe 1	V	4th
2015–16	Landesliga Niederrhein, Gruppe 1	V	2nd
2016–17	Landesliga Niederrhein, Gruppe 1	V	3rd
2017–18	Landesliga Niederrhein, Gruppe 1	V	1st ↑
2018–19	Niederrheinliga	IV	8th
2019–20	Niederrheinliga	IV	1st* ↑
2020–21	Regionalliga West	III	6th*
2021–22	Regionalliga West	III	5th
2022–23	Regionalliga West	III	3rd
2023–24	Regionalliga West	III	2nd
2024–25	Regionalliga West	III	1st ↑
2025–26	2. Bundesliga	II	14th ↓

*Season abandoned due to the COVID-19 pandemic.

↑ Promoted	↓ Relegated
