= FC St. Pauli (women) =

- Full name: Fußball-Club St. Pauli von 1910 e.V.
- Nickname: Kiezkickerinnen
- Founded: 1990; 36 years ago
- Ground: FeldArena
- Capacity: 1,000
- President: Oke Göttlich
- Manager: Kim Koschmieder; Jan-Philipp Kalla
- League: Regionalliga Nord
- 2024–25: 6th
Home colours	Away colours

FC St. Pauli is a women's association football club from St. Pauli, Hamburg, Germany. It is part of the FC St. Pauli club.

== History ==
FC St. Pauli was initially established in 1970 but was disbanded two years later due to strong resistance within the club, before it was reestablished in 1990.

In 2016, the club became champions of the Verbandsliga Hamburg, followed by beating TuRa Meldorf and TuS Schwachhausen in the promotion round, thus securing their place in the Regionalliga Nord. In their debut 2016–17 Regionalliga season, they finished in third place. During the 2022–23 season, FC St. Pauli won the Lotto Cup with a 6–1 victory against FC Union Tornesch. Hence, they qualified for the 2023–24 DFB Cup for the first time, where they were defeated 7–1 by Hamburger SV at the Millerntor-Stadion in the second round.

== Squad ==
As of 3 July 2026

Note: Flags indicate national team as defined under FIFA eligibility rules; some limited exceptions apply. Players may hold more than one non-FIFA nationality.

No.	Pos.	Nation	Player
2	DF	GER	Midou Loubongo-Mboungou
3	DF	GER	Gianna Nicoleit
4	MF	GER	Merle Oppenheim
5	DF	GER	Nina Woitzik
6	MF	GER	Marlene Berlinghoff
7	DF	GER	Carlotta Kuhnert
8	MF	GER	Jette Schulz
9	MF	GER	Linda Preuß
11	MF	GER	Ann-Sophie Greifenberg
12	MF	GER	Josefine Lutz
13	MF	GER	Janice Hauschild
14	MF	USA	Annie Kingman
15	MF	GER	Pauline Ginsberg
16	FW	GER	Aksana Alizadeh

No.	Pos.	Nation	Player
18	FW	GER	Madeline Gieseler
19	MF	GER	Emily Schmolke
20	DF	GER	Linnea Taube
21	DF	GER	Paula Bodenstedt
23	MF	GER	Annika Schwarz
24	MF	GER	Lina Jubel
25	FW	GER	Emma Frings
26	DF	GER	Alessa Blankenhorn
29	FW	GER	Julia Hechtenberg
30	FW	GER	Neele Nordhausen
31	MF	SUI	Rachel Rinast
32	GK	GER	Friederike Ihle
—	DF	GER	Gloria Adigo
—	GK	GER	Nusaybah Salami
—	GK	GER	Narie Reinwald
—	DF	GER	Jana Braum
—	DF	GER	Nele Dünchem
—	DF	GER	Phine Ebert
—	MF	GER	Malena Watzlawik
—	FW	GER	Kimberly Hillje

== Current staff ==
As of 26 June 2024

Coaching staff
(Germany) Kim Koschmieder (Germany) Jan-Philipp Kalla	Head coach
(Germany) Felix Beyer (Germany) Daniel Ott	Goalkeeping coach
(Germany) Saba Shakalio (Germany) Gina-Tanita Reich	Athletic trainer
Managerial staff
(Germany) Kristina Voegelin	Supervisor
(Germany) Kea Eckermann	Game analysis
(Germany) Edgar Dieckow	Coordination and communication
Medical department
(Germany) Marius Funk	Physiotherapist
