= Anja Pfluger =

German association football player

Personal information
- Date of birth: 16 November 1993 (age 32)
- Place of birth: Ravensburg, Germany
- Height: 1.62 m (5 ft 4 in)
- Position: Midfielder

Senior career*
Years	Team	Apps	(Gls)
2012–2020	Bayern Munich II	168	(34)
2014–2020	Bayern Munich	1	(0)
2020–2022	1. FC Köln	33	(1)
2022–2025	SGS Essen	21	(0)
- * Club domestic league appearances and goals as of 22 February 2026

Anja Pfluger (born 16 November 1993) is a German former footballer who played as a Midfielder. After her last competitive match on 11 May, 2025 (matchday 22) in the 0:3 defeat in the away game against Bayern Munich, she ended her playing career.
