= SC Fortuna Köln (women) =

- Full name: Sport-Club Fortuna Köln e.V.
- Founded: 2003; 23 years ago
- Ground: Jean-Löring-Sportpark, Cologne
- Capacity: 1,500
- Head coach: Tarek Maarouf
- League: Regionalliga West
- 2024–25: 4th
Home colours	Away colours

SC Fortuna Köln is a German women's association football team based in Cologne, North Rhine-Westphalia.

== History ==
The women's football department of SC Fortuna Köln was founded in 2003 and quickly rose through the ranks. In their very first season, the team, averaging just 17 years old, won the district championship with an impressive goal difference of 192:7 and secured promotion to the Verbandsliga. There, they soon fought for promotion to the Regionalliga West, which they achieved in 2008 with a comfortable 16-point lead. However, the team struggled to maintain their status in the Regionalliga. After relegation in the 2009–10 season, the following years were challenging, with the threat of dropping further from the Verbandsliga. The team bounced back in 2011–12, earning promotion again to the Regionalliga West, but were relegated once more to the Mittelrheinliga in 2013. The almost unchanged squad immediately secured an unbeaten direct promotion back to the Regionalliga in the 2013–14 season.

In the subsequent seasons, Fortuna managed to establish themselves in the Regionalliga West, even reaching the league's top three in 2016–17, before relegating to the Mittelrheinliga again in 2019.

The team's biggest successes came in the Middle Rhine Cup, which they have won multiple times, granting them qualification to the DFB-Pokal Frauen. Notable cup victories occurred in 2007 against FC Sankt Augustin, 2008 against VfL Kommern, 2013 against Sportfreunde Uevekoven, 2015 against Pulheimer SC, 2019 against Grün-Weiß Brauweiler, 2020 against Alemannia Aachen, 2022 against Vorwärts Spoho Köln, 2023 against SC West Köln, 2024 against Alemannia Aachen, and 2025 against DJK Südwest Köln.

== Squad ==
As of 22 June 2025

Note: Flags indicate national team as defined under FIFA eligibility rules; some limited exceptions apply. Players may hold more than one non-FIFA nationality.

No.	Pos.	Nation	Player
1	GK	GER	Hanna de Haan
2	DF	GER	Anne Hahn
3	DF	GER	Annika Boden
4	DF	GER	Franziska Weißhaar
5	DF	GER	Theresa Garsztecki
6	DF	GER	Kathrin Wojtasik
7	MF	GER	Milena Kohlmeyer
8	MF	GER	Anna Graßinger
9	DF	GER	Luzie Kirsch
10	MF	GER	Paula Petri
11	MF	GER	Fabienne Patrice Meder
12	GK	GER	Cybell Osagie
13	MF	GER	Muriel Bey
14	MF	GER	Sophie Trepohl

No.	Pos.	Nation	Player
15	FW	GER	Vivien Schwing
16	FW	GER	Svenja Streller
17	MF	GER	Juliana Höfer
18	FW	GER	Alica Linden
19	DF	GER	Amelie Wortberg
20	FW	GER	Naomi Januschewski
21	MF	GER	Emma Gumbel
22	GK	KOS	Alma Demiri
23	DF	GER	Natalie Kreitz
24	DF	GER	Marah Schaar
26	MF	GER	Mara-Lotta Finger
27	DF	GER	Leonie Hölzle
28	MF	GER	Selma Fohrer

== Current staff ==
As of 22 June 2025

Coaching staff
(Germany) Tarek Maarouf	Head coach
(Germany) Abdurrahman Cicek	Assistant coach
(Germany) Roman Weiß	Athletic coach
(Germany) Mete Balbasi	Goalkeeping coach
(Germany) Benita Schmitt	Physiotherapist
(Germany) Marc Gertzen (Germany) Marcus Anhalt	Trainer
(Germany) Achim Stuhr	Team manager

== Notable players ==
- (Germany) Sara Doorsoun
- (Germany) Laura Eßer
- (Germany) Mandana Knopf
- (Germany) Isabelle Linden
- (Croatia) Josipa Bokanović
- (Italy) Assunta Sarago
- (Portugal) Catia Alves Pereira
- (Turkey) Arzu Karabulut
