= Jacqueline de Backer =

German footballer

Personal information
- Date of birth: 31 July 1994 (age 32)
- Place of birth: Püttlingen, Germany
- Height: 1.61 m (5 ft 3 in)
- Position: Forward

Jacqueline de Backer (born 12 July 1994) is a German footballer who played as a forward for 1. FC Saarbrücken.
