= FC Viktoria 1889 Berlin (women) =

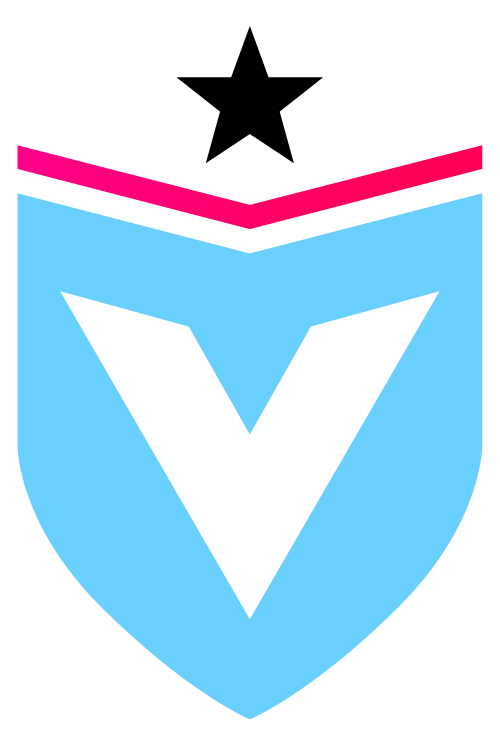
- Full name: Fußball-Club Viktoria 1889 Berlin Lichterfelde-Tempelhof e.V.
- Ground: Stadion Lichterfelde
- Capacity: 4,300
- Manager: Miren Ćatović
- League: 2. Frauen-Bundesliga
- 2025–26: 2. Bundesliga, 5th of 14
Home colours	Away colours

FC Viktoria 1889 Berlin is a women's association football club from Berlin, Germany. It is part of the FC Viktoria 1889 Berlin club.

== History ==
The women's football team of FC Viktoria 1889 Berlin began its rise after merging with LFC Berlin, which allowed them to take a spot in the 2. Bundesliga Nord for the 2013–14 season. After a difficult year, they were relegated back to the Regionalliga Nordost, where they have competed steadily since the 2014–15 season.

In 2018, the team celebrated a major achievement by winning the Berlin Cup with a 4–1 victory over Blau-Weiß 90 Berlin. Over the next few seasons, Viktoria consistently challenged for top honors, finishing second behind 1. FC Union Berlin in 2019 and RB Leipzig in 2020. Although the 2020–21 season was interrupted by the COVID-19 pandemic, Viktoria was selected to play in promotion playoffs for the 2. Bundesliga but ultimately lost to SV Henstedt-Ulzburg.

Viktoria continued to build momentum and won the Regionalliga Nordost title in 2023 but missed promotion after falling to Hamburger SV in the playoff. Nevertheless, they secured another Berlin Cup win and qualified for the DFB-Pokal, where they made history by reaching the Round of 16 for the first time.

In mid-2022, the women's section took a major step by professionalizing through the formation of a GmbH. 75.1% of this new company was acquired by a group of investors forming the Sports Idols 22 GmbH, including entrepreneur Verena Pausder, former German international Ariane Hingst, business leaders Tanja Wielgoß, Felicia Mutterer, Lisa Währer (OneFootball), and Katharina Kurz (BRŁO Craft Beer). Additional investors include former swimmer Franziska van Almsick and comedian Carolin Kebekus. A 23.9% stake was held by the FC Viktoria 1889 Berlin Fußball GmbH, responsbile for the men's team, while 1% remained under the ownership of FC Viktoria 1889 Berlin e.V. Sports Idols 22 GmbH increased its stake to 81.7% in 2024, and to 99% in October 2025 when the men's GmbH withrew.

In May 2025, Viktoria clinched promotion to the 2. Bundesliga by finishing top of the Regionalliga Nordost.

== Squad ==
As of 12 July 2026

Note: Flags indicate national team as defined under FIFA eligibility rules; some limited exceptions apply. Players may hold more than one non-FIFA nationality.

No.	Pos.	Nation	Player
1	GK	GER	Melanie Wagner
2	DF	AUT	Sarah Klotz
3	DF	NED	Anna Ursem
8	MF	GER	Alisa Grincenco
9	FW	GER	Christin Meyer
11	MF	NZL	Maya Hahn
12	DF	GER	Nina Zimmer
13	MF	GER	Trinity Künzel
14	MF	GER	Maja Wasiak
14	DF	GER	Pia Metzker
16	FW	GER	Kim Urbanek
17	GK	USA	Blythe Braun
18	DF	GER	Katharina Krist
19	MF	GER	Denise Eder
22	DF	GER	Sarah Stöckmann

No.	Pos.	Nation	Player
26	DF	GER	Anna Höfker
28	DF	GER	Victoria Ezebinyuo
29	FW	GER	Nina Ehegötz (captain)
30	FW	TUR	Senanur Yavuz
33	GK	GER	Jolina Zamorano
47	FW	TUR	Leyila Aydin
53	MF	ESP	Laura Casanovas
99	GK	SUI	Michèle Tschudin
—	FW	CZE	Aneta Polášková
—	GK	GER	Hannah Etzold
—	DF	GER	Vanessa Fürst
—	MF	GER	Alina Bantle
—	FW	GER	Melina Reuter
—	MF	GER	Leni Fischer
—	FW	GER	Antonia Halverkamps

== Current staff ==
As of 18 October 2025

Coaching staff
(Serbia) Miren Ćatović	Head coach
(Germany) Darien Hoffmann	Assistant coach
(Netherlands) Anouk Dekker	Assistant coach
(Germany) Marco Sejna	Goalkeeping coach
(Germany) Christopher Stosno	Athletic trainer
(Germany) Catharina Schimpf	Sporting director
(Germany) Yayoi Vandycke	Team manager
(Germany) Rona Beckelmann (Germany) Celine Mantos	Physiotherapist
(Germany) Mario Nurtsch	Game analyst and Scout
(Germany) Selina Koch	Sport psychologist and mental coach
(Germany) Billa Christe	Mental coach
