= 1. FFV Erfurt =

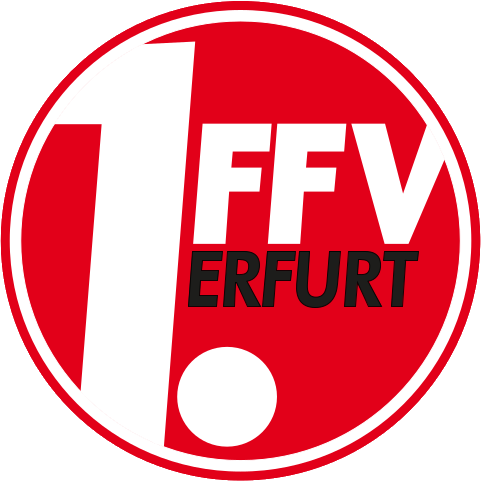
- Full name: 1. Frauenfußballverein Erfurt
- Founded: 1990 as FFV/Grün-Weiß Erfurt, (June 1997 as 1. FFV Erfurt)
- Ground: Sports Forum Johannesplatz, grass
- President: Martin Arnold
- Manager: Ulrich Barthel
- League: Regionalliga Northeast
- 2015–16: 9th
- Website: https://ffv-erfurt.de/
Home colours	Away colours

1. FFV Erfurt is a semi-professional women's soccer team from Erfurt, Germany. Founded in June 1997, 1. FFV Erfurt plays in the Fußball-Regionalliga (women) (Regional League) Northeast. The team colors are red and blue.

== History ==
The team was originally formed in 1990 as part of the Sports Club Green-White Erfurt (SV Grün-Weiß Erfurt.) As Green-White, they had marginal success, winning the Thüringer Cup during the 1993/94 season and playing in the first round of the 1993 DFB Pokal. However, in June 1997, the women’s team separated from the main club and became independent, renaming themselves as 1. FFV Erfurt.

Over the next six years, 1. FFV Erfurt was unsuccessful in winning any titles and seemed to be facing constant relegation to a lower league. Finally, in 2005, the team overthrew previous champions FF USV Jena in the Thüringian Indoor Cup. This marked the beginning of a new era for the club. After a very successful season in 2005/06, 1. FFV Erfurt was promoted to the Regional League Northeast (Fußball-Regionalliga (women).) After having played in a lower league (Landesliga Thüringen) since 1998, the influx of younger, more skilled players led to this promotion.

During their 2006–2007 season, 1. FFV Erfurt won both the Thüringian Indoor Cup and the Thüringen Regional Championship. Erfurt drew SC Sand in the first round of the 2006 Frauen DFB Pokal where they nearly made the second round for the first time in team history. After playing both regulation and overtime, the game came to a penalty shoot-out. 1. FFV Erfurt lost in the second round of penalty kicks, with the final score being 0-0 (8-7) in favor of SC Sand.

Erfurt didn't let this loss break their spirits. Since 2006, 1. FFV Erfurt has won the Thüringen Regional Championship three more times, during the 2007–08, 2009–10 and 2010–11 seasons. Additionally, they made the 1st round of the DFB Pokal in 2007, 2009 and 2010.

== Successes ==
- Promotion from the Oberliga to Regionalliga, 1992 and 2006
- Thüringen Regional Cup Champions - 1993/94, 2006/07, 2007/08, 2009/10, 2010/11
- Thüringen Indoor Champions - 2005, 2006
- 1st Round Frauen DFB Pokal- 1993, 2006, 2007, 2009, 2010

== Coaches and team staff ==
Name	Position
(Germany) Ulrich Barthel	Head coach
(Germany) Kerstin Wettmann	Assistant coach
(Germany) Ronny Wenzel	Goalie coach
(Germany) Marcel Täschner	Physical therapist
