= Tennis Borussia Berlin (women) =

- Full name: Tennis Borussia Berlin e.V.
- Nicknames: TeBe, die Veilchen (The Violets)
- Founded: 1969
- Ground: Mommsenstadion
- Capacity: 15,005
- Chairman: Andreas Voigt
- League: Verbandsliga Berlin
- 2015–16: 1st
Home colours	Away colours

Tennis Borussia Berlin (women) was a football team based in Berlin, Germany. The women's team of the Tennis Borussia Berlin football club was established in 1969. They gained promotion to the newly created Bundesliga in 1991, where they played for six years. After two relegations to the Regionalliga in 1997 and 2003, they competed successfully in the 2. Bundesliga from 2004 onwards. In 2009, they became league champions, earning promotion back to the Bundesliga, but were relegated again the following season.

The club sent no women's team to the championship for the 2012/13 season, and was subsequently represented only in the seven-a-side women's Verbandsliga Berlin. The team was no longer registered after the 2017/18 season.
