= Women's football in East Germany =

Women's association football clubs in the German Democratic Republic were first established in the late 1960s. While local leagues began in 1970, a national championship was first held in 1979 and a cup was not played until 1987.

== History ==
In 1968, the Bulgarian student Vladimir Zvetkov founded the first women's team as a section of BSG Empor Dresden-Mitte (today Dresdner SC). While several local functionaries were opposed to the idea of women playing football, Zvetkov was eventually allowed to pursue his idea. The first women's football game in the GDR was held on 4 August 1969. Dresden defeated Empor Possendorf 2–0 in front of 1,600 spectators.

Since women's football was not an Olympic sport, and thus had little prestige, the local authorities did not patronize the sport, instead treating it as a mere recreational activity. Despite this lack of governmental interest, the pioneers from Dresden were able to set up an eight-team league in 1970. By the end of 1971, the number of women's football teams in East Germany had grown to 150. Supra-regional competitions were refused for several years until, in 1979, a national championship was held for the first time. A cup competition was inaugurated in 1987 and a national league was founded in 1990, the year before German reunification was completed. The national football team was organized in 1989, its only game being a 0–3 defeat at the hands of Czechoslovakia on 9 May 1990 in Potsdam.

After the 1990–91 season, the clubs from the former GDR were integrated into the German Football Association. The top two finishers from the only Oberliga season, USV Jena and Wismut Aue, were assigned spots in the Bundesliga, but both were immediately relegated. In 1994, former GDR club Turbine Potsdam was promoted to the Bundesliga and has since won every major honour in women's club football, including the UEFA Cup in 2005.

== Champions ==
Key

n/a	No final was held

Year	Champions	Result	Runners-Up	Location
1979	Motor Mitte Karl-Marx-Stadt	n/a	BSG Aufbau Dresden-Ost	Templin
1980	BSG Wismut Karl-Marx-Stadt	n/a	Aufbau Dresden-Ost	Bad Blankenburg
1981	BSG Turbine Potsdam	n/a	BSG Chemie Wolfen	Babelsberg
1982	BSG Turbine Potsdam	n/a	Chemie PCK Schwedt	Lauchhammer
1983	BSG Turbine Potsdam	n/a	BSG Wismut Karl-Marx-Stadt	Schwedt
1984	BSG Motor Halle	n/a	BSG Turbine Potsdam	Colditz and Grimma
1985	BSG Turbine Potsdam	2–0	BSG Wismut Karl-Marx-Stadt	Markkleeberg
1986	BSG Turbine Potsdam	4–1	BSG Motor Halle	Dresden
1987	BSG Rotation Schlema	4–1	BSG Wismut Karl-Marx-Stadt	Kamenz
1988	BSG Rotation Schlema	3–0; 1–3	BSG Turbine Potsdam	Aue; Babelsberg
1989	BSG Turbine Potsdam	3–1; 2–3	BSG Rotation Schlema	Babelsberg; Aue
1990	BSG Post Rostock	6–1; 4–2	BSG Wismut Chemnitz	Chemnitz; Rostock
1991	Uni SV Jena	n/a	FC Wismut Aue	

== Cup ==
The Democratic Women's League Cup (German: Pokal des Demokratischen Frauenbundes) was held from 1987 to 1991. As the name suggests, the cup was funded not by the football association, but by the Democratic Women's League of Germany. Little information is available about the competition. In particular, for the first two seasons, only the winners are known. In the competition's short history, only Rotation Schlema was able to win the title twice.

Year	Champions	Result	Runners-Up	Location
1987	Rotation Schlema	–:–	unknown	unknown
1988	Wismut Karl-Marx-Stadt	–:–	unknown	unknown
1989	Rotation Schlema	1–0	HSG Uni Jena	Berlin
1990	BSG Post Rostock	0–0 (aet); 5–3 (pso)	Wismut Chemnitz	Senftenberg
1991	Wismut Aue	2–0	SSV Turbine Potsdam	Hettstedt
