= 2020–21 DFB-Pokal Frauen =

Tournament details
- Country: Germany
- Venue(s): RheinEnergieStadion, Cologne
- Dates: 19 September 2020 – 30 May 2021
- Teams: 52

Final positions
- Champions: VfL Wolfsburg (8th title)
- Runners-up: Eintracht Frankfurt

Tournament statistics
- Matches played: 51
- Goals scored: 246 (4.82 per match)
- Attendance: 4,550 (89 per match)
- Top goal scorer(s): Nina Heisel; Stefanie Sanders (8 goals)

The 2020–21 DFB-Pokal was the 41st season of the annual German football cup competition. Several teams participated in the competition, including all teams from the previous year's Frauen-Bundesliga and the 2. Frauen-Bundesliga, excluding second teams. The competition began on 19 September 2020 with the first of six rounds and ended on 30 May 2021 with the final at the RheinEnergieStadion in Cologne, a nominally neutral venue, which has hosted the final since 2010. The DFB-Pokal is considered the second-most important club title in German women's football after the Bundesliga championship. The DFB-Pokal is run by the German Football Association (DFB).

The defending champions were Frauen-Bundesliga side VfL Wolfsburg, after they defeated SGS Essen in the previous final.

Wolfsburg went on to win the title for the seventh consecutive time, after defeating Eintracht Frankfurt 1–0 in the final.

== Effects of the COVID-19 pandemic ==
On 31 August 2020, the DFB Executive Committee decided to extend the use of five substitutions in matches (with a sixth allowed in extra time) to the 2020–21 season, which was implemented at the end of the previous season to lessen the impact of fixture congestion caused by the COVID-19 pandemic. The use of five substitutes, based on the decision of competition organisers, had been extended by IFAB until 2021.

== Participating clubs ==
The following 52 clubs qualified for the competition:

Bundesliga the 12 clubs of the 2019–20 season	2. Bundesliga; 9 of the 14 clubs of the 2019–20 season (Note: The second teams of Eintracht Frankfurt (as FFC Frankfurt), 1899 Hoffenheim, Bayern Munich, Turbine Potsdam and VfL Wolfsburg were not eligible.)	Regionalliga; 10 champions and runners-up of the 2019–20 season
MSV Duisburg; SGS Essen; Eintracht Frankfurt (as 1. FFC Frankfurt); SC Freiburg; 1899 Hoffenheim; Carl Zeiss Jena (as USV Jena); 1. FC Köln; Bayer Leverkusen; Bayern Munich; Turbine Potsdam; SC Sand; VfL Wolfsburg	SG Andernach; Arminia Bielefeld; Werder Bremen; ~~BV Cloppenburg~~; FSV Gütersloh; FC Ingolstadt; SV Meppen; Borussia Mönchengladbach; 1. FC Saarbrücken	SpVg Berghofen; Viktoria Berlin; Borussia Bocholt; VfL Bochum; SV Göttelborn; SV Henstedt-Ulzburg; RB Leipzig; 1. FFC 08 Niederkirchen; 1. FC Nürnberg; Würzburger Kickers (as Würzburg Dragons)
Verbandspokal the 21 winners of the regional association cups
Baden: Karlsruher SC; Bavaria: SV 67 Weinberg (Note: The Bavarian Cup was abandoned before the quarter-finals. The Bavarian Football Association decided to hold a draw to determine its DFB-Pokal representative. SV 67 Weinberg won this draw and qualified.); Berlin: BSV Grün-Weiss Neukölln (Note: Grün-Weiss Neukölln qualified regardless of the outcome of the Berlin Cup final, as Viktoria Berlin, the other finalists, already qualified for the DFB-Pokal through their Regionalliga position.); Brandenburg: FSV Babelsberg 74 (Note: The Brandenburg Cup was abandoned before the semi-finals. The Brandenburg Football Association and the remaining participants agreed to enter FSV Babelsberg 74 in the DFB-Pokal.); Bremen: ATS Buntentor; Hamburg: Walddörfer SV; Hesse: Opel Rüsselsheim (Note: Opel Rüsselsheim qualified regardless of the outcome of the Hessian Cup final, as Eintracht Frankfurt, the other finalists, already qualified for the DFB-Pokal as the club's first team in the Bundesliga after acquiring 1. FFC Frankfurt. Eintracht's third team (previously the first) won the cup but, being the club's second reserve team, is not eligible.)	Lower Rhine: SV Büdberg (Note: SV Büdberg qualified regardless of the outcome of the Rhineland Cup final, as Borussia Bocholt, the other finalists, already qualified for the DFB-Pokal through their Regionalliga position.); Lower Saxony: Jahn Delmenhorst; Mecklenburg-Vorpommern: Rostocker FC (Note: The Mecklenburg-Vorpommern Cup was abandoned before the semi-finals. The Mecklenburg-Vorpommern State Football Association and the remaining participants agreed to enter Rostocker FC in the DFB-Pokal.); Middle Rhine: Fortuna Köln; Rhineland: SV Holzbach; Saarland: SV Göttelborn; Saxony: Phoenix Leipzig (Note: Phoenix Leipzig qualified regardless of the outcome of the Saxony Cup final, as RB Leipzig, the other finalists, already qualified through their Regionalliga position.)	Saxony-Anhalt: Magdeburger FFC; Schleswig-Holstein: Holstein Kiel (Note: The SHFV Cup was abandoned before the final. The Schleswig-Holstein Football Association and the remaining participants agreed to enter Holstein Kiel in the DFB-Pokal.); South Baden: SV Gottenheim; Southwest: TuS Wörrstadt (Note: The Southwestern Cup was abandoned after the first round. The Southwest German Football Association decided to hold a draw to determine its DFB-Pokal representative. TuS Wörrstadt won this draw and qualified.); Thuringia: 1. FFV Erfurt; Westphalia: SSV Rhade; Württemberg: SV Alberweiier

== Format ==
Clubs from lower leagues will host against clubs from higher leagues until the quarter-finals. Should both clubs play below the 2. Bundesliga, there will be no host club change anymore. In the first round, the matches are split into a "North" and "South" zone.

== Schedule ==
The rounds of the 2020–21 competition are scheduled as follows:

Round	Matches
First round	19–27 September 2020
Second round	31 October – 1 November 2020
Round of 16	5–6 December 2020
Quarter-finals	20–21 March 2021
Semi-finals	4 April 2021
Final	29 May 2021 at RheinEnergieStadion, Cologne

== First round ==
The draw was made on 25 August 2020. The matches were played on 19, 20, 26 and 27 September 2020.

19 September 2020	BSV Grün-Weiss Neukölln	0–9	SV Meppen	Berlin
14:00		Report	Flaws 7', 37'; Ihlenburg 41'; Schulte 52'; Goad 67'; Bitzer 77'; Endemann 80'; Fullenkamp 84'; Emmerling 86'	Stadium: Volkspark Mariendorf; Attendance: 430; Referee: Miriam Schwermer

20 September 2020	Borussia Mönchengladbach	0–5	Werder Bremen	Mönchengladbach
11:00		Report	Goddard 4'; Lührßen 37'; Walkling 41'; Zimmer 83'; Sehan 85'	Stadium: Grenzlandstadion; Attendance: 95; Referee: Kathrin Heimann

26 September 2020	SV 67 Weinberg	7–1	SV Holzbach	Weinberg
13:30	Heisel 27' (pen.), 43', 58', 74', 79', 86'; Kömm 71'	Report	Becker 47'	Stadium: Sportplatz Weinberg; Attendance: 100; Referee: Karoline Wacker

26 September 2020	Holstein Kiel	1–2	SV Berghofen	Kiel
14:00	Krohn 55'	Report	Peck 53'; Krapp 62'	Stadium: Stadion Waldwiese; Attendance: 150; Referee: Franziska Wildfeuer

26 September 2020	FC Ingolstadt	3–2	Würzburger Kickers	Ingolstadt
14:00	McCullough 35' (pen.); Mailbeck 36'; Walter 48'	Report	Veland 71'; Desic 76'	Stadium: Audi Sportpark; Attendance: 180; Referee: Silke Fritz

26 September 2020	SV Gottenheim	3–6	1. FC Saarbrücken	Gottenheim
15:00	Werz 37', 45+1'; Brenn 66' (pen.)	Report	Douglas 23', 55'; Bogenschütz 62'; Matuschewski 69', 88'; Anstatt 90+1'	Stadium: Stadion an der Buchheimer Straße; Attendance: 400; Referee: Selina Menzel

26 September 2020	SV Alberweiler	0–2	SG Andernach	Alberweiler
16:00		Report	Weingarz 50'; Schumacher 90+1'	Stadium: Hauptspielfeld; Attendance: 108; Referee: Melissa Joos

26 September 2020	SSV Rhade	0–1	Borussia Bocholt	Rhade
18:00		Report	Ter Horst 9'	Stadium: Sportpark Risthaus; Attendance: 298; Referee: Julia Boike

26 September 2020	FSV Gütersloh	5–1	Arminia Bielefeld	Rheda-Wiedenbrück
18:00	Schulz 22'; Baum 34'; Aehling 48'; Aradini 69'; Berning 74'	Report	Sternad 30'	Stadium: Tönnies Arena; Attendance: 0 (Note: The match was played behind closed doors due to the COVID-19 pandemic in Germany.); Referee: Kathrin Heimann

27 September 2020	SV Budberg	0–3	SV Henstedt-Ulzburg	Rheinberg
11:00		Report	Lux 34', 40'; Hahn 56'	Stadium: Scania Sportpark Budberg; Attendance: 140; Referee: Nadine Westerhoff

27 September 2020	Fortuna Köln	3–0 (a.e.t.)	FSV Babelsberg	Cologne
11:00	Buschinski 97', 118'; Tepe 115'	Report		Stadium: BZA Chorweiler; Attendance: 104; Referee: Naemi Breier

27 September 2020	RB Leipzig	2–0	1. FFC Niederkirchen	Leipzig
11:00	Frank 38'; Müller 57'	Report		Stadium: RB-Trainingszentrum Cottaweg; Attendance: 287; Referee: Davina Haupt

27 September 2020	1. FC Riegelsberg	1–1 (a.e.t.) (3–4 p)	Karlsruher SC
13:00	Scheid 10'	Report	Rogee 74'	Attendance: 100; Referee: Christina Biehl
	Penalties
	Wagner (penalty scored); Scherer (penalty scored); Quatrana (penalty scored)		(penalty scored) Grünbacher; (penalty scored) Kasprzyk; (penalty scored) Häfele; (penalty scored) Nagel

27 September 2020	Opel Rüsselsheim	0–0 (a.e.t.) (5–4 p)	1. FC Nürnberg	Rüsselsheim am Main
13:00		Report		Stadium: Stadion am Sommerdamm; Attendance: 196; Referee: Katharina Menke
	Penalties
	Fedel (penalty scored); Bennhardt (penalty scored); Jager (penalty scored); Sieber (penalty scored); Oberenzer (penalty scored)		(penalty scored) Urbanek; (penalty scored) Burkard; (penalty scored) May; (penalty scored) Richert

27 September 2020	Rostocker FC	0–2	Walddörfer SV	Rostock
14:00		Report	Eggers 16'; Saalmüller 56'	Stadium: Ostseestadion; Attendance: 100; Referee: Mirka Derlin

27 September 2020	VfL Bochum	3–0	Viktoria Berlin	Bochum
14:00	Vogel 31'; Wilhelm 33'; Radke 52'	Report		Stadium: Leichtathletikplatz am Vonovia Ruhrstadion; Attendance: 248; Referee: Katrin Rafalski

27 September 2020	Jahn Delmenhorst	8–1	ATS Buntentor	Delmenhorst
14:00	Detken 11', 36'; Heeren 51', 66'; Hechtenberg 56'; Reck 68'; Herzberg 82', 85'	Report	Stenzel 45'	Stadium: Städtisches Stadion an der Düsternortstraße; Attendance: 100; Referee: Anke Hölscher

27 September 2020	1. FFC Erfurt	3–1	Phoenix Leipzig	Erfurt
14:00	Nehlert 26', 55'; Uhl 73'	Report	Lübcke 50'	Stadium: Sportforum Johannesplatz; Attendance: 149; Referee: Christine Weigelt

27 September 2020	TuS Wörrstadt	0–5	SV Göttelborn	Wörrstadt
14:00		Report	Hager 11', 47', 63'; Wagner 27'; Pilger 30'	Stadium: Sportplatz Am Neuborn; Attendance: 100; Referee: Fabienne Michel

Magdeburger FFC	Walkover	BV Cloppenburg
Note: BV Cloppenburg withdrew before the competition.

== Second round ==
The draw was made on 1 October 2020. The matches were played on 31 October and 1 November 2020.

31 October 2020	Magdeburger FFC	0–8	Turbine Potsdam	Magdeburg
14:00		Report	Kössler 14', 29', 47', 76'; Ehegötz 23', 83'; Smidt Nielsen 36'; Mori 90'	Stadium: Heinrich Germer Stadium; Attendance: 455; Referee: Susann Kunkel

31 October 2020	VfL Bochum	0–11	VfL Wolfsburg	Bochum
14:00		Report	Jakabfi 1', 24', 28', 51'; Oberdorf 11', 67', 81'; Sævik 38'; Goeßling 48' (pen.); Rauch 61'; Wolter 80'	Stadium: Ruhrstadion; Attendance: 0 Referee: Laura Duske

31 October 2020	Karlsruher SC	0–8	Eintracht Frankfurt	Karlsruhe
14:00		Report	Freigang 4', 12' (pen.), 45', 90'; Reuteler 23'; Pawollek 57'; Martinez 63', 73'	Stadium: Wildparkstadion Platz 2 Attendance: 200; Referee: Ines Appelmann

31 October 2020	SG Andernach	3–1	1. FC Saarbrücken	Andernach
14:00	Weingarz 3', 63'; Umbach 8'	Report	Anstatt 89'	Stadium: Stadion Andernach; Attendance: 210; Referee: Sonja Reßler

31 October 2020	Borussia Bocholt	0–3	MSV Duisburg	Bocholt
15:00		Report	Angerer 6'; Maierhofer 69'; Morina 70' (pen.)	Stadium: Schröer-Consulting-Arena; Attendance: 0 Referee: Kathrin Heimann

31 October 2020	FSV Gütersloh	3–2 (a.e.t.)	SGS Essen	Rheda-Wiedenbrück
17:00	Rieke 49'; Aradini 75'; Reimann 107'	Report	Anyomi 32', 88'	Stadium: Tönnies Arena; Attendance: 0 Referee: Nadine Westerhoff

31 October 2020	Fortuna Köln	0–2	Werder Bremen	Cologne
19:00		Report	Walkling 56'; Radosavljević 90'	Stadium: Südstadion; Attendance: 0 Referee: Christina Biehl

1 November 2020	RB Leipzig	4–1	SV Berghofen	Markranstädt
11:00	Gaus 11', 12'; Müller 41'; Weilharter 68' (pen.)	Report	Weilharter 14' (o.g.)	Stadium: Stadion am Bad Markranstädt; Attendance: 100; Referee: Miriam Schwermer

1 November 2020	Carl Zeiss Jena	0–2	Bayern Munich	Jena
13:30		Report	Asseyi 18'; Laudehr 74'	Stadium: Ernst-Abbe-Sportfeld Platz 3 Attendance: 250; Referee: Katrin Rafalski

1 November 2020	Opel Rüsselsheim	0–11	SC Freiburg	Rüsselsheim am Main
14:00		Report	Kayikçi 2', 12'; Sanders 20' (pen.), 30', 31'; Starke 40', 78'; Memeti 60'; Wensing 73'; Knaak 85'; Stegemann 90+1'	Stadium: Stadion am Sommerdamm; Attendance: 0 Referee: Melissa Joos

1 November 2020	SV Henstedt-Ulzburg	2–3	SV Meppen	Henstedt-Ulzburg
14:00	Witt 45'; Hahn 61'	Report	Bitzer 25'; Flaws 33'; Berentzen 80'	Stadium: Stadion am Schäferkampsweg; Attendance: 0 Referee: Franziska Wildfeuer

1 November 2020	FC Ingolstadt	2–4 (a.e.t.)	1899 Hoffenheim	St. Leon-Rot
14:00	Maier 64'; Spittka 86'	Report	Steinert 26'; Hagel 49' (pen.); Beuschlein 93'; Waßmuth 102'	Stadium: Ensinger Stadion; Attendance: 0 Referee: Karoline Wacker

1 November 2020	SV 67 Weinberg	5–0	1. FFC Erfurt	Weinberg
14:00	Hasenfuß 43'; Hofrichter 57'; Bauereisen 66'; Heisel 69'; Brückner 81'	Report		Stadium: Sportplatz Weinberg; Attendance: 50; Referee: Marina Bachmann

1 November 2020	1. FC Köln	1–0	Bayer Leverkusen	Cologne
18:00	Barrett 62'	Report		Stadium: Franz-Kremer-Stadion; Attendance: 0 Referee: Vanessa Arlt

6 December 2020 (Note: The match, originally scheduled for 31 October 2020, was postponed after a positive COVID-19 test by a Göttelborn player.)	SV Göttelborn	1–4	SC Sand	Saarbrücken
14:00	Reiter 50'	Report	Evels 17'; Tolmais 52'; Hoppius 60', 68'	Stadium: Sportplatz am Franzenhaus; Attendance: 0 Referee: Ines Appelmann

13 December 2020 (Note: The match, originally scheduled for 1 November 2020, was postponed after several positive COVID-19 tests by Walddörfer SV players.)	Jahn Delmenhorst	1–2	Walddörfer SV	Delmenhorst
12:00	Herzberg 81'	Report	Saalmüller 15'; Pleqi 34'	Stadium: Städtisches Stadion an der Düsternortstraße; Referee: Nadine Westerhoff

== Round of 16 ==
The draw was made on 8 November 2020. The matches were played on 5 and 6 December 2020 and in early 2021.

5 December 2020	SV 67 Weinberg	1–9	SC Freiburg	Leutershausen
14:00	Heisel 5'	Report	Sanders 2', 54' (pen.), 82'; Kayikçi 5'; Stegemann 47'; Müller 51'; Vojteková 58'; Mégroz 77'; Buser 90'	Stadium: Stadion am Lindenhain] Attendance: 0 Referee: Fabienne Michel

6 December 2020	RB Leipzig	0–4	Eintracht Frankfurt	Leipzig
13:00		Report	Reuteler 10'; Kirchberger 55'; Dunst 57'; Prašnikar 72'	Stadium: Stadion am Bad; Attendance: 0 Referee: Karoline Wacker

6 December 2020	SG Andernach	6–1	FSV Gütersloh	Andernach
14:00	Pagel 3' (o.g.); Hornberg 12', 54'; Zilligen 26'; Schermuly 76'; Weißenfels 87'	Report	Berning 45+1'	Stadium: Stadion am Bassenheimer Weg; Attendance: 0 Referee: Laura Duske

6 December 2020	VfL Wolfsburg	3–1	MSV Duisburg	Wolfsburg
14:00	Janssen 55'; Sævik 63'; Van de Sanden 90+2'	Report	Baucom 27'	Stadium: AOK Stadion; Attendance: 0 Referee: Mirka Derlin

6 December 2020	1. FC Köln	1–6	1899 Hoffenheim	Cologne
15:00	Islacker 8' (pen.)	Report	Harsch 4'; Brand 20'; Waßmuth 34', 54'; Billa 37', 38'	Stadium: Franz-Kremer-Stadion; Attendance: 0 Referee: Kathrin Heimann

30 January 2021	Walddörfer SV	0–13	Bayern Munich	Hamburg
15:00		Report	Schüller 18', 20', 29', 64', 77'; Magull 24'; Lohmann 35'; Hegering 41'; Corley 44', 45'; Bühl 50'; Dallmann 87'; Pollak 88'	Stadium: HFV-Sportschule; Attendance: 0 Referee: Anna-Lena Heidenreich

28 February 2021	Turbine Potsdam	2–1	SC Sand	Potsdam
13:00	Ehegötz 14'; Gerhardt 58'	Report	Plasmann 33'	Stadium: Karl-Liebknecht-Stadion; Attendance: 0 Referee: Susann Kunkel

28 February 2021 (Note: The match, originally scheduled for 5 December 2020, was postponed after two positive COVID-19 tests by Werder Bremen players.)	Werder Bremen	2–2 (a.e.t.) (5–3 p)	SV Meppen	Bremen
14:00	Hausicke 28'; Tarczyńska 105'	Report	Krug 61'; Flaws 101'	Stadium: Weserstadion Platz 11; Attendance: 0 Referee: Sina Diekmann
	Penalties
	Tarczyńska (penalty scored); Radosavljević (penalty scored); Jaser (penalty scored); Ulbrich (penalty scored); Volkmer (penalty scored)		(penalty scored) Berentzen; (penalty scored) Preuß; (penalty scored) Flaws; (penalty missed) Fullenkamp

== Quarterfinals ==
The draw for the round of 16 was held on 3 January 2021. The matches took place from 19 to 21 March 2021.

19 March 2021	1899 Hoffenheim	1–2	Bayern Munich	Sinsheim
18:30	Waßmuth 60'	Report	Schüller 29', 48'	Stadium: Dietmar-Hopp-Stadion; Attendance: 0 Referee: Nadine Westerhoff

20 March 2021	VfL Wolfsburg	7–0	Werder Bremen	Wolfsburg
14:00	Blomqvist 29'; Popp 30', 74'; Oberdorf 40'; Huth 42'; Jaser 53' (o.g.); Pajor 82'	Report		Stadium: AOK Stadion; Attendance: 0 Referee: Susann Kunkel

21 March 2021	SC Freiburg	6–3	Turbine Potsdam	Freiburg
13:00	Minge 30'; Sanders 41', 59' (pen.); Memeti 54'; Buser 81'; Müller 90+2'	Report	Cerci 25', 90+3'; Elsig 74' (pen.)	Stadium: Möslestadion; Attendance: 0 Referee: Fabienne Michel

21 March 2021	SG Andernach	1–7	Eintracht Frankfurt	Andernach
15:00	Hornberg 14'	Report	Reuteler 9', 48'; Dunst 35', 60', 69'; Freigang 79'; Mauron 81'	Stadium: Stadion Andernach; Attendance: 0 Referee: Laura Duske

== Semifinals ==
The draw was held on 28 February 2021. The matches took place on 3 and 4 April 2021.

3 April 2021	Eintracht Frankfurt	2–1	SC Freiburg	Frankfurt
13:00	Prašnikar 47'; Küver 62'	Report	Müller 13'	Stadium: Stadion am Brentanobad; Attendance: 0 Referee: Kathrin Heimann

4 April 2021	VfL Wolfsburg	2–0	Bayern Munich	Wolfsburg
14:00	Popp 13'; Pajor 45+2'	Report		Stadium: AOK Stadion; Attendance: 0 Referee: Susann Kunkel

== Final ==
30 May 2021
16:00

Eintracht Frankfurt	0–1 (a.e.t.)	VfL Wolfsburg
	Report	Pajor 118'

RheinEnergieStadion, Cologne
Attendance: 0
Referee: Mirka Derlin

Eintracht Frankfurt	VfL Wolfsburg

GK	1	(Germany) Merle Frohms
RB	2	(Brazil) Letícia Santos
CB	4	(Germany) Sophia Kleinherne	(yellow card) 103'
CB	20	(Germany) Laura Störzel		(substituted off) 95'
LB	23	(Germany) Camilla Küver		(substituted off) 91'
RM	27	(Austria) Laura Feiersinger
CM	8	(Germany) Sjoeke Nüsken
CM	31	(Germany) Tanja Pawollek (c)		(substituted off) 40'
LM	28	(Austria) Barbara Dunst		(substituted off) 106'
CF	10	(Germany) Laura Freigang
CF	7	(Slovenia) Lara Prašnikar
Substitutes:
GK	26	(Germany) Cara Bösl
DF	13	(Austria) Virginia Kirchberger		(substituted on) 95'
DF	16	(Germany) Janina Hechler		(substituted on) 91'
MF	5	(Iceland) Alexandra Jóhannsdóttir		(substituted on) 40'
MF	15	(Switzerland) Sandrine Mauron
FW	9	(Germany) Shekiera Martinez		(substituted on) 106'
FW	19	(Germany) Theresa Panfil
Manager:
(Germany) Niko Arnautis

GK	1	(Germany) Almuth Schult (c)	(red card) 96'
RB	24	(Germany) Joelle Wedemeyer		(substituted off) 49'
CB	23	(Germany) Sara Doorsoun
CB	6	(Netherlands) Dominique Janssen
LB	13	(Germany) Felicitas Rauch
CM	15	(Norway) Ingrid Syrstad Engen
CM	5	(Germany) Lena Oberdorf	(yellow card) 29'
RW	10	(Germany) Svenja Huth
AM	16	(Sweden) Rebecka Blomqvist		(substituted off) 65'
LW	14	(Sweden) Fridolina Rolfö		(substituted off) 98'
CF	17	(Poland) Ewa Pajor		(substituted off) 120'
Substitutes:
GK	27	(Germany) Friederike Abt		(substituted on) 98'
MF	3	(Hungary) Zsanett Jakabfi	(yellow card) 120+1'	(substituted on) 120'
MF	9	(Germany) Anna Blässe		(substituted on) 49'
MF	20	(Germany) Pia-Sophie Wolter		(substituted on) 65'
MF	21	(Switzerland) Lara Dickenmann
MF	22	(Netherlands) Shanice van de Sanden
MF	28	(Germany) Lena Goeßling
Manager:
(Germany) Stephan Lerch

Assistant referees:
Vanessa Arlt
Jacqueline Herrmann
Fourth official:
Susann Kunkel

Match rules

- 90 minutes.
- 30 minutes of extra time if necessary.
- Penalty shoot-out if scores still level.
- Nine named substitutes.
- Maximum of five substitutions, with a sixth allowed in extra time. (Note: Each team will only be given three opportunities to make substitutions, with a fourth opportunity in extra time, excluding substitutions made at half-time, before the start of extra time and at half-time in extra time.)

== Top goalscorers ==
Rank	Player	Team	Goals
1	(Germany) Nina Heisel	SV 67 Weinberg	8
1	(Germany) Stefanie Sanders	SC Freiburg	8
3	(Germany) Lea Schüller	Bayern Munich	7
4	(Austria) Barbara Dunst	Eintracht Frankfurt	4
4	(United States) Jannelle Flaws	SV Meppen	4
4	(Germany) Laura Freigang	Eintracht Frankfurt	4
4	(Hungary) Zsanett Jakabfi	VfL Wolfsburg	4
4	(Germany) Melissa Kössler	Turbine Potsdam	4
4	(Switzerland) Géraldine Reuteler	Eintracht Frankfurt	4
4	(Germany) Lena Oberdorf	VfL Wolfsburg	4
4	(Germany) Tabea Waßmuth	1899 Hoffenheim	4
