= Pia-Sophie Wolter =

German footballer

- Wolter in 2018

Personal information
- Full name: Pia-Sophie Wolter
- Date of birth: 13 November 1997 (age 29)
- Place of birth: Bremen, Germany
- Height: 1.67 m (5 ft 6 in)
- Position: Midfielder

Team information
- Current team: Eintracht Frankfurt
- Number: 17

Youth career
- 2006–2011: Habenhauser FV
- 2011–2014: Werder Bremen

Senior career*
Years	Team	Apps	(Gls)
2014–2018	Werder Bremen	66	(6)
2018–2023	VfL Wolfsburg	62	(10)
2018–2023	VfL Wolfsburg II	6	(2)
2023–	Eintracht Frankfurt	64	(2)

International career^{‡}
2015–2016	Germany U19	12	(0)
2015–2016	Germany U20	8	(0)
2020–	Germany	7	(0)
Medal record
UEFA Women's Nations League
Bronze medal – third place	2024 France–Netherlands–Spain
- * Club domestic league appearances and goals as of 21 November 2026 ‡ National team caps and goals as of 18:03, 4 December 2024 (UTC)

Pia-Sophie Wolter (born 13 November 1997) is a German professional footballer who plays as a midfielder for Eintracht Frankfurt and the Germany national team.

== Club career ==
Wolter started playing soccer at Habenhauser FV in 2006, having previously played handball. In 2011 she moved to the youth department of Werder Bremen, with whose C-Juniors she became North German Champion in 2012 and for the B-Juniors from the 2012–13 season in the newly founded Bundesliga North/Northeast was used. On 23 March 2014 (matchday 15) she made her debut for the women's team in the 2nd Bundesliga North in the 0–1 home defeat against 1. FC Lübars and scored on 25 May 2014 (matchday 21) in the 3 1–1 away win against FF USV Jena II, scoring their first goal in the final. In 2014–15 she was an integral part of the team and was used in 21 of 22 league games. As runners-up, she managed to get promoted to the Bundesliga with the team at the end of the season, since champions 1. FC Lübars decided against promotion. After the season, she was also voted Player of the Season by fans. On 30 August 2015 (Day 1), she made her debut in a 6–2 win at home against co-promoted 1. FC Köln in the Bundesliga from the start.

For the 2018–19 season, Wolter switched to VfL Wolfsburg.

On 18 July 2023, Wolter was announced at Eintracht Frankfurt on a one year contract.

== International career ==
Wolter made her national debut in March 2015 in La Manga, Spain, when she made three appearances for the U19 national team as part of a "Three Nations Tournament". Four months later, she was part of Germany's 18-player squad for the U19 European Championship, appearing in all four games there, including three as a late substitute. In the semi-final against Sweden, she was in the starting XI, but lost to the eventual European Champions on penalties.

She was first called up to the senior national team for a game against England that was set to take place on 27 October 2020. However, the game was canceled by the English association on 25 October because a member of the coaching staff tested positive for COVID-19. She made her senior international debut on 1 December 2020 in Dublin in the final Group I European Championship qualifier in a 3–1 win over the Ireland national team.

Wolter made her international debut for Germany on 1 December 2020, coming on as a substitute in the 61st minute for Kathrin Hendrich against the Republic of Ireland. The away match finished as a 3–1 win for Germany.

On 17 July 2024, Lena Oberdorf withdrew from the 2024 Summer Olympics squad due to injury. Janina Minge was called up in her place, whilst Wolter was added to the alternate list.

== Career statistics ==
=== International ===
As of 2 December 2024

Appearances and goals by national team and year
National team	Year	Apps	Goals
Germany	2020	1	0
Germany	2024	6	0
Total		7	0

== Honours ==
VfL Wolfsburg

- Frauen-Bundesliga: 2018–19, 2019–20, 2021–22
- DFB-Pokal Frauen: 2018–19, 2019–20, 2020–21, 2021–22, 2022–23

Werder Bremen

- 2. Frauen-Bundesliga: 2016–17; Promotion: 2014–15

Germany

- UEFA Women's Nations League third place: 2023–24
