= Friederike Repohl =

German footballer

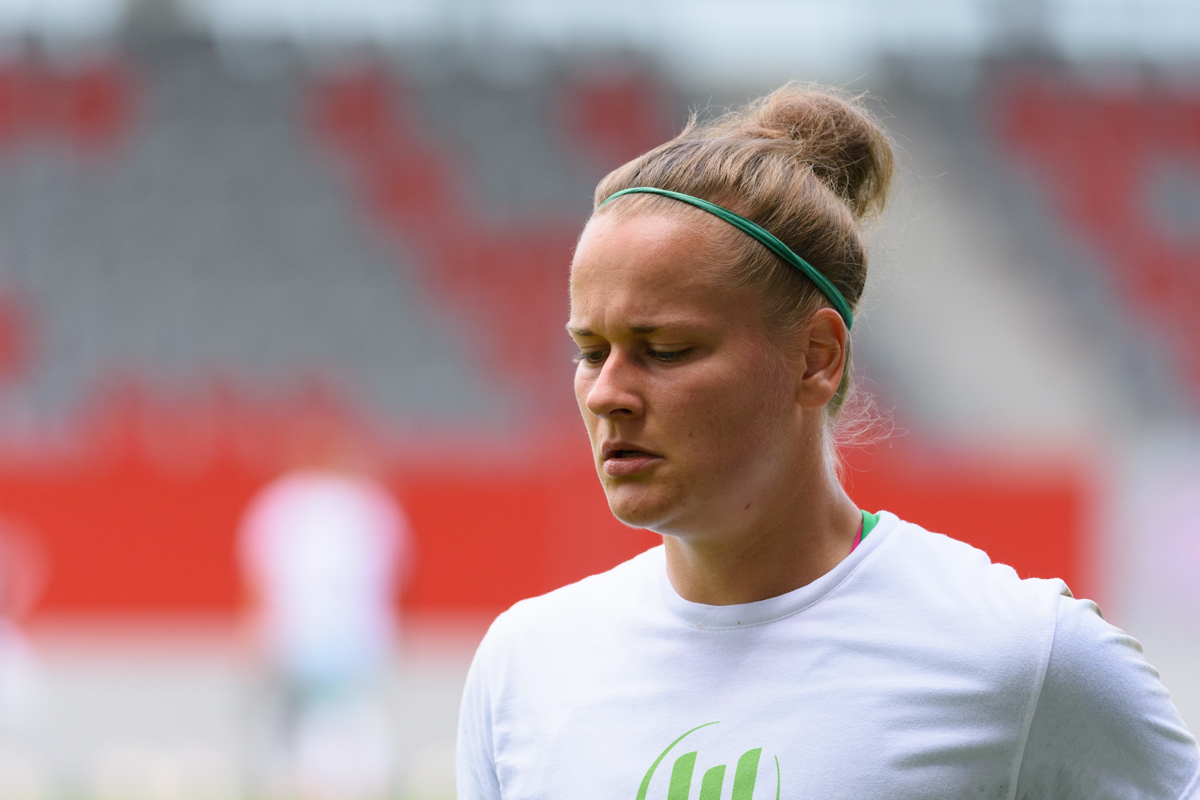
- Repohl in 2020

Personal information
- Date of birth: 7 July 1994 (age 32)
- Place of birth: Bielefeld, Germany
- Height: 1.78 m (5 ft 10 in)
- Position: Goalkeeper

Youth career
- 2000–2005: FC Altenhagen
- 2005–2011: Herforder SV

Senior career*
Years	Team	Apps	(Gls)
2010–2015	Herforder SV	27	(0)
2015–2019	TSG Hoffenheim	43	(0)
2019–2021	VfL Wolfsburg	6	(0)
2021–2026	Bayer Leverkusen	80	(0)

International career^{‡}
2009	Germany U15	3	(0)
2009–2011	Germany U17	7	(0)
2011	Germany U19	3	(0)
- * Club domestic league appearances and goals as of 5 July 2026 ‡ National team caps and goals as of 30 August 2020

Friederike Repohl (née Abt; born 7 July 1994) is a German footballer. She played as a goalkeeper for 1899 Hoffenheim, VfL Wolfsburg, Bayer Leverkusen, in the Frauen-Bundesliga. She was a member of the German Under-19 national team that won the 2011 U-19 European Championship.

== Career ==
=== Clubs ===
Repohl began her career in 2000 at FC Altenhagen. She switched to Herforder SV in 2005, where she was active in the youth division. Already in the 2010/2011 season, she was promoted to the professional squad of Herford and made her Bundesliga debut on March 6, 2011 in the 4–2 defeat in the away game against SGS Essen-Schoenebeck. Bottom of the table, the club was relegated from the Bundesliga after one season. In the 2011/12 second division season, Repohl was the first-choice goalkeeper until she tore a cruciate ligament in January 2012 and was out for more than half a year. At the beginning of the 2012/13 season, she first made a few appearances for Herford's second team in the Westphalian League, but tore her cruciate ligament again. She made her comeback in March 2014. On April 23, 2015, Repohl announced her move to TSG 1899 Hoffenheim after 10 years at Herforder SV Borussia. At Hoffenheim, she made irregular appearances in her first two seasons in the Bundesliga, but she has been the first-choice goalkeeper since the 2017/18 season. For the 2019/20 season she moved to VfL Wolfsburg. She was in goal at the 2020 Champions League finals in Spain, second-choice to Katarzyna Kiedrzynek. In the summer of 2021 she joined Bayer 04 Leverkusen.

She ended her active professional career in the summer of 2026.

=== National team ===
She made her international debut on 15 April 2009, when she kept goal in Germany's U-15 team's 5–0 win over the Netherlands in Rhede.

She made her debut for the U-17 national team on September 6, 2009 in a 10–0 win over Israel. She took part in the 2010 U-17 European Championship in Switzerland and came in third. She played in the 2010 U-17 World Cup, in a 10–1 win over South Africa. In 2011 she was again in the squad for the U-17 European Championship, where the team finished third. In total, Repohl completed seven games for the U-17 national team.

She made her debut for the U19 national team on May 11, 2011 in a 5–0 win over Russia. In the same year she was part of the German squad for the U19 European Championship in Italy, where she played in the third group game in the 2–1 win against the Netherlands on June 5.

On 19 October 2020, she was called up to replace the injured Ann-Katrin Berger for the national team friendly against England. However, the game was canceled by the English association on October 25 because a member of the support staff tested positive for the corona virus.

== Honours ==
VfL Wolfsburg

- Frauen-Bundesliga: Winner 2019–20
- DFB-Pokal: Winner 2019–20, 2020–21

Germany U17

- FIFA U-17 World Cup: Third place 2008
- UEFA Under-17 European Championship: Third place 2010, 2011

Germany U19

- UEFA Under-19 European Championship: Winner 2011
