= Stephan Lerch =

German football coach

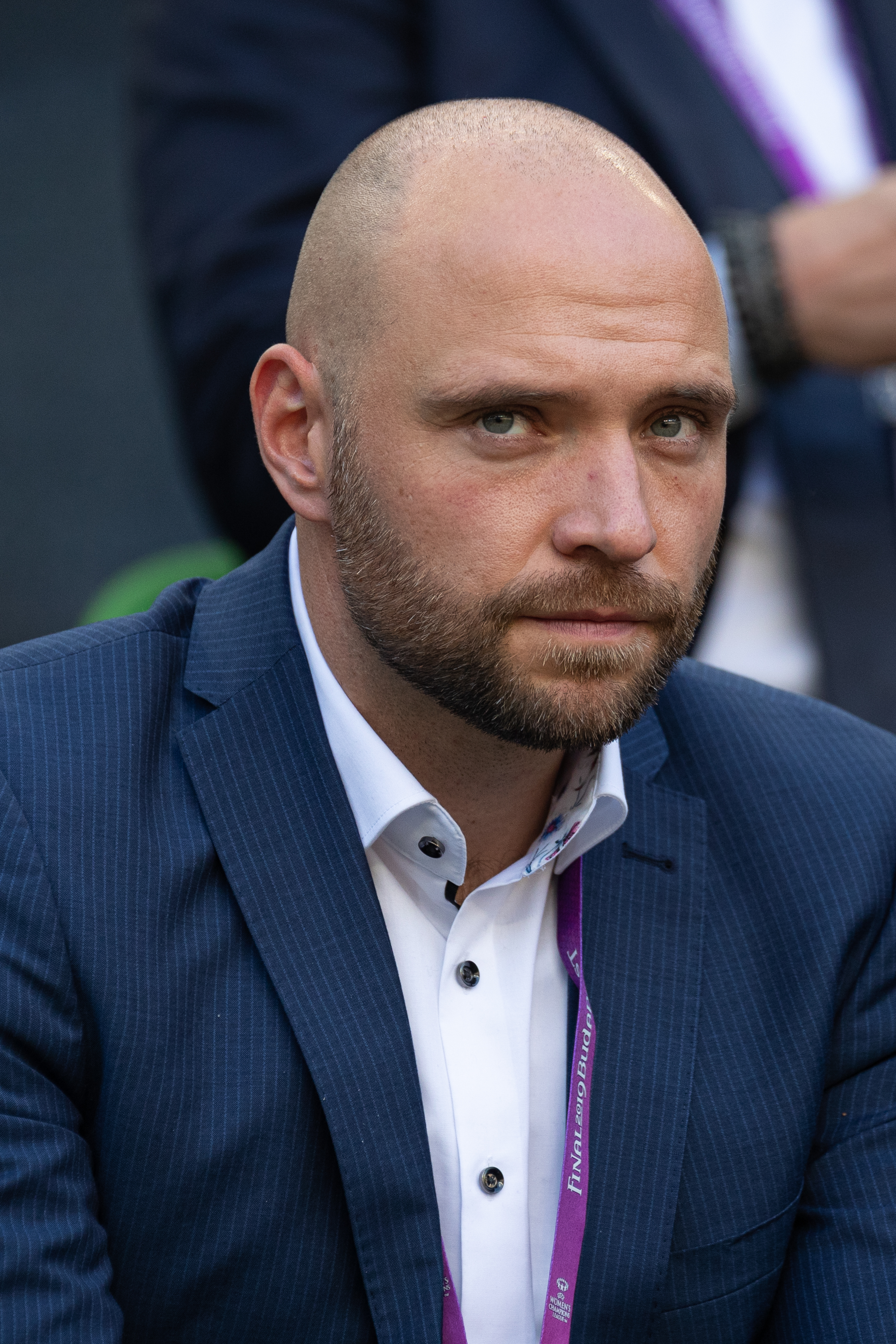
- Lerch in 2019

Personal information
- Date of birth: 10 August 1984 (age 42)
- Place of birth: Darmstadt, West Germany
- Height: 1.83 m (6 ft 0 in)
- Position: Midfielder

Senior career*
Years	Team	Apps	(Gls)
2004–2010	FC Alsbach		

Managerial career
- 2012–2013: FC Alsbach
- 2013–2015: VfL Wolfsburg II (women)
- 2015–2017: VfL Wolfsburg (women) (assistant)
- 2017–2021: VfL Wolfsburg (women)
- 2023–2024: TSG Hoffenheim (women)
- 2025–: VfL Wolfsburg (women)
- * Club domestic league appearances and goals

Stephan Lerch (born 10 August 1984) is a German football coach who is the manager of Frauen-Bundesliga club VfL Wolfsburg.

== Coaching career ==
Lerch's first manager job, were at his former club FC Alsbach in 2012, where he also played from 2004 to 2010.

Lerch joined VfL Wolfsburg second team, where he was the team's head coach for two season, until he became assistant coach for the club's first team in the summer 2015.

In April 2017, he replaced his coach colleague German Ralf Kellermann as new head coach for VfL Wolfsburg. Kellermann were the team's head coach for about nine years until he became the new sporting director for the women's team. Since his election as new head coach, he qualified the team for the 2018 UEFA Women's Champions League Final in Kyiv. Wolfsburg was defeated 1–4 by Lyon. He has won the national league Frauen-Bundesliga and DFB-Pokal every year since his election in 2017.

On 30 April 2025, it was announced that Lerch had returned to Wolfsburg and signed a two year contract with the club, effective from 1 July 2025.

== Coaching honors ==
VfL Wolfsburg

- Frauen-Bundesliga:
  - Winners (4): 2016–17, 2017–18, 2018–19, 2019–20
  - Runners-up (2): 2015–16, 2020–21
- DFB Pokal:
  - Winners (6): 2015–16, 2016–17, 2017–18, 2018–19, 2019–20, 2020–21
- UEFA Women's Champions League:
  - Runners-up (3): 2015–16, 2017–18, 2019–20
