= 2019–20 DFB-Pokal Frauen =

Tournament details
- Country: Germany
- Venue(s): RheinEnergieStadion, Cologne
- Dates: 3 August 2019 – 4 July 2020
- Teams: 49

Final positions
- Champions: VfL Wolfsburg (7th title)
- Runners-up: SGS Essen

Tournament statistics
- Matches played: 56
- Goals scored: 197 (3.52 per match)
- Attendance: 15,867 (283 per match)
- Top goal scorer(s): Sarah Grünheid (8 goals)

The 2019–20 DFB-Pokal was the 40th season of the annual German football cup competition. 48 teams participated in the competition, including all teams from the previous year's Frauen-Bundesliga and the 2. Frauen-Bundesliga, excluding second teams. The competition began on 3 August 2019 with the first of six rounds and ended on 4 July 2020 with the final at the RheinEnergieStadion in Cologne, a nominally neutral venue, which has hosted the final since 2010. The DFB-Pokal is considered the second-most important club title in German women's football after the Bundesliga championship. The DFB-Pokal is run by the German Football Association (DFB).

The defending champions were Frauen-Bundesliga side VfL Wolfsburg, after they defeated SC Freiburg 1–0 in the previous final. Wolfsburg once again won the cup, defeating SGS Essen after penalties.

The competition was suspended on 16 March 2020 due to the COVID-19 pandemic in Germany, and resumed in June 2020 with matches behind closed doors.

== Effects of the COVID-19 pandemic ==
Due to the COVID-19 pandemic in Germany, on 16 March, it was announced that the competition will be suspended until 19 April. On 3 April, the suspension was extended until 30 April. On 20 May, it was announced that the competition would be continued on 2 June. All remaining matches were played behind closed doors. In addition, five substitutions were permitted for the remaining matches, with a sixth allowed in extra time, following a proposal from FIFA and approval by IFAB to lessen the impact of fixture congestion.

== Participating clubs ==
The following 49 clubs qualified for the competition:

Bundesliga the 12 clubs of the 2018–19 season	2. Bundesliga; 8 of the 14 clubs of the 2018–19 season (Note: The second teams of SGS Essen, 1. FFC Frankfurt, 1899 Hoffenheim, Bayern Munich, Turbine Potsdam and VfL Wolfsburg were not eligible.)	Regionalliga; 8 of the 10 champions and runners-up of the 2018–19 season (Note: The automatic qualification of the Regionalliga runners-up is unconfirmed, but matches the list of participants. The second team of Werder Bremen was not eligible. 1. FC Nürnberg replaced the second team of SC Sand, which was not eligible. Regionalliga Nordost runners-up Viktoria Berlin were not included for finishing as Berlin Cup runners-up.)
Werder Bremen; MSV Duisburg; SGS Essen; 1. FFC Frankfurt; SC Freiburg; 1899 Hoffenheim; Bayer Leverkusen; Borussia Mönchengladbach; Bayern Munich; Turbine Potsdam; SC Sand; VfL Wolfsburg	BV Cloppenburg; FSV Gütersloh; USV Jena; 1. FC Köln; SV Meppen; 1. FC Saarbrücken; SV Weinberg; Hessen Wetzlar	SG Andernach; Arminia Bielefeld; FC Ingolstadt; Union Berlin; Borussia Bocholt; 1. FFC 08 Niederkirchen; 1. FC Nürnberg; Walddörfer SV
Verbandspokal the 21 winners of the regional association cups
Baden: Karlsruher SC; Bavaria: FC Forstern; Berlin: Viktoria Berlin (Note: Viktoria Berlin qualified regardless of the outcome of the final of the Berlin Cup, as Union Berlin, the other finalists, already qualified for the DFB-Pokal through their Regionalliga position.); Brandenburg: FSV Babelsberg 74; Bremen: TuS Schwachhausen; Hamburg: Hamburger SV; Hesse: Eintracht Frankfurt	Lower Rhine: 1. FC Mönchengladbach; Lower Saxony: Eintracht Braunschweig; Mecklenburg-Vorpommern: HSG Warnemünde; Middle Rhine: SC Fortuna Köln; Rhineland: SV Holzbach (Note: SV Holzbach qualified regardless of the outcome of the final of the Rhineland Cup, as SG Andernach, the other finalists, already qualified for the DFB-Pokal through their Regionalliga position.); Saarland: SV Göttelborn; Saxony: RB Leipzig	Saxony-Anhalt: Magdeburger FFC; Schleswig-Holstein: Holstein Kiel; South Baden: Hegauer FV; Southwest: TuS Wörrstadt; Thuringia: 1. FFV Erfurt (Note: 1. FFV Erfurt qualified regardless of the outcome of the final of the Thuringian Cup, as USV Jena II, the other finalists, were not eligible.); Westphalia: SpVg Berghofen; Württemberg: SV Hegnach

== Format ==
Clubs from lower leagues hosted against clubs from higher leagues until the quarter-finals. If both clubs were below the 2. Bundesliga, there was no host club change.

== Schedule ==
The rounds of the 2019–20 competition were scheduled as follows:

Round	Matches
First round	3–4 August 2019
Second round	7–8 September 2019
Round of 16	16–17 November 2019
Quarter-finals	21–22 March 2020
Semi-finals	18–19 April 2020
Final	30 May 2020 at RheinEnergieStadion, Cologne

== Matches ==
A total of forty-nine matches will take place, starting with the first round on 3 August 2019 and culminating with the final on 4 July 2020 at the RheinEnergieStadion in Cologne.

Times up to 26 October 2019 and from 29 March 2020 are CEST (UTC+2). Times from 27 October 2019 to 28 March 2020 are CET (UTC+1).

== First round ==
The seventeen matches were drawn on 11 July and took place on 3 and 4 August 2019. The twelve clubs from the 2018–19 Bundesliga season and the three best-placed clubs from the 2018–19 2. Bundesliga received a bye.

Team 1	Score	Team 2
Eintracht Braunschweig	1–3	Arminia Bielefeld
FSV Babelsberg	1–6	Walddörfer SV
1. FFV Erfurt	0–7	1. FC Saarbrücken
Hegauer FV	0–1	FC Ingolstadt
FC Forstern	2–0	1. FFC Niederkirchen
TuS Wörrstadt	1–0	1. FC Mönchengladbach
Hamburger SV	2–0	Union Berlin
RB Leipzig	4–2	BV Cloppenburg
Borussia Bocholt	3–0	Viktoria Berlin
TuS Schwachhausen	1–5	SV Berghofen
HSG Warnemünde	0–7	FSV Gütersloh
Magdeburger FFC	2–3	Holstein Kiel
SV Göttelborn	1–5	SG Andernach
SV Holzbach	0–4	1. FC Nürnberg
Eintracht Frankfurt	3–1	SV Hegnach
Fortuna Köln	1–4	FSV Hessen Wetzlar
SV 67 Weinberg	5–0	Karlsruher SC

== Second round ==
The draw was held on 10 August 2019. The matches will be played on 7 and 8 September 2019.

Team 1	Score	Team 2
[Holstein Kiel	1–3	1. FC Köln
SV Berghofen	0–2	VfL Wolfsburg
Eintracht Frankfurt	0–5	Bayern Munich
SG 99 Andernach	0–1	FF USV Jena
Borussia Bocholt	0–7	Turbine Potsdam
SV 67 Weinberg	0–1	1. FC Saarbrücken
1. FC Nürnberg	2–0 (a.e.t.)	TuS Wörrstadt
Borussia Mönchengladbach	1–2	Bayer Leverkusen
Arminia Bielefeld	0–0; 5–3 (p)	MSV Duisburg
SV Meppen	1–5	SGS Essen
Walddörfer SV Hamburg	1–4	Werder Bremen
Hamburger SV	2–2; 4–5 (p)	FSV Gütersloh
FSV Hessen Wetzlar	0–7	TSG Hoffenheim
RB Leipzig	0–1	1. FFC Frankfurt
FC Ingolstadt	0–2	SC Sand
FC Forstern	1–6	SC Freiburg

== Round of 16 ==
The draw was held on 13 September 2019. The matches were played on 16 and 17 November 2019.

Team 1	Score	Team 2
TSG Hoffenheim	6–1	FF USV Jena
1. FFC Frankfurt	0–1	Bayer Leverkusen
Werder Bremen	0–2	SC Sand
Bayern Munich	1–3	VfL Wolfsburg
SC Freiburg	2–3	Turbine Potsdam
1. FC Nürnberg	1–2	Arminia Bielefeld
1. FC Saarbrücken	3–4 (a.e.t.)	FSV Gütersloh
1. FC Köln	1–3	SGS Essen

== Quarterfinals ==
The draw was held on 9 February 2020. The matches were played on 2 and 3 June 2020 behind closed doors, due to the COVID-19 pandemic in Germany.

Team 1	Score	Team 2
Bayer Leverkusen	3–2 (a.e.t.)	TSG Hoffenheim
Arminia Bielefeld	3–2	SC Sand
Turbine Potsdam	1–3	SGS Essen
FSV Gütersloh	0–3	VfL Wolfsburg

== Semifinals ==
The draw was held on 26 May 2020. The matches took place on 10 and 11 June 2020 behind closed doors.

Team 1	Score	Team 2
Arminia Bielefeld	0–5	VfL Wolfsburg
Bayer 04 Leverkusen	1–3	SGS Essen

== Final ==
4 July 2020
16:45 (UTC+2)

VfL Wolfsburg	3–3 (a.e.t.)	SGS Essen
Harder 11'; Blässe 70'; Bloodworth 86'	Report	Schüller 1'; Hegering 18'; Ioannidou 90+1'
Penalties
Bloodworth (penalty scored); Neto (penalty scored); Popp (penalty missed); Goeßling (penalty scored); Harder (penalty scored)	4–2	(penalty scored) Schüller; (penalty scored) Oberdorf; (penalty missed) Ioannidou; (penalty missed) Brüggemann

RheinEnergieStadion, Cologne
Attendance: 0 (Note: The final will be played behind closed doors due to the COVID-19 pandemic in Germany.)
Referee: Nadine Westerhoff

VfL Wolfsburg	SGS Essen

GK	27	(Germany) Friederike Abt
RB	9	(Germany) Anna Blässe	(yellow card) 26'
CB	23	(Germany) Sara Doorsoun
CB	28	(Germany) Lena Goeßling
LB	6	(Netherlands) Dominique Bloodworth
RM	10	(Germany) Svenja Huth		(substituted off) 89'
CM	15	(Norway) Ingrid Syrstad Engen		(substituted off) 97'
CM	11	(Germany) Alexandra Popp
LM	14	(Sweden) Fridolina Rolfö		(substituted off) 72'
CF	17	(Poland) Ewa Pajor
CF	22	(Denmark) Pernille Harder (c)	(yellow card) 25'
Substitutes:
GK	36	(Sweden) Hedvig Lindahl
DF	16	(Switzerland) Noelle Maritz		(substituted in) 72'
DF	24	(Germany) Joelle Wedemeyer
MF	3	(Hungary) Zsanett Jakabfi
MF	5	(Portugal) Claudia Neto		(substituted in) 97'
MF	13	(Germany) Felicitas Rauch
MF	20	(Germany) Pia-Sophie Wolter		(substituted in) 89'
Manager:
(Germany) Stephan Lerch

GK	1	(Germany) Stina Johannes
RB	16	(Germany) Jacqueline Klasen
CB	22	(Germany) Nina Brüggemann
CB	27	(Germany) Marina Hegering (c)
LB	18	(Germany) Lena Ostermeier
CM	31	(Germany) Jana Feldkamp
CM	6	(Germany) Elisa Senß
RW	33	(Germany) Turid Knaak		(substituted off) 78'
AM	19	(Germany) Lena Oberdorf
LW	17	(Germany) Nicole Anyomi	(yellow card) 40'	(substituted off) 64'
FW	7	(Germany) Lea Schüller
Substitutes:
GK	20	(Germany) Kim Sindermann
FW	8	(Germany) Manjou Wilde
MF	11	(Germany) Irini Ioannidou		(substituted in) 78'
MF	14	(Germany) Mara Grutkamp
MF	25	(Germany) Maria Lange
MF	13	(Germany) Ramona Petzelberger		(substituted in) 64'
FW	9	(Germany) Kirsten Nesse
Manager:
(Germany) Markus Hoegner

Assistant referees:
Sina Diekmann
Annika Paszehr
Fourth official:
Kathrin Heimann

Match rules

- 90 minutes.
- 30 minutes of extra time if necessary.
- Penalty shoot-out if scores still level.
- Nine named substitutes.
- Maximum of five substitutions, with a sixth allowed in extra time. (Note: Each team will only be given three opportunities to make substitutions, with a fourth opportunity in extra time, excluding substitutions made at half-time, before the start of extra time and at half-time in extra time.)
