= Felicitas Rauch =

German footballer (born 1996)

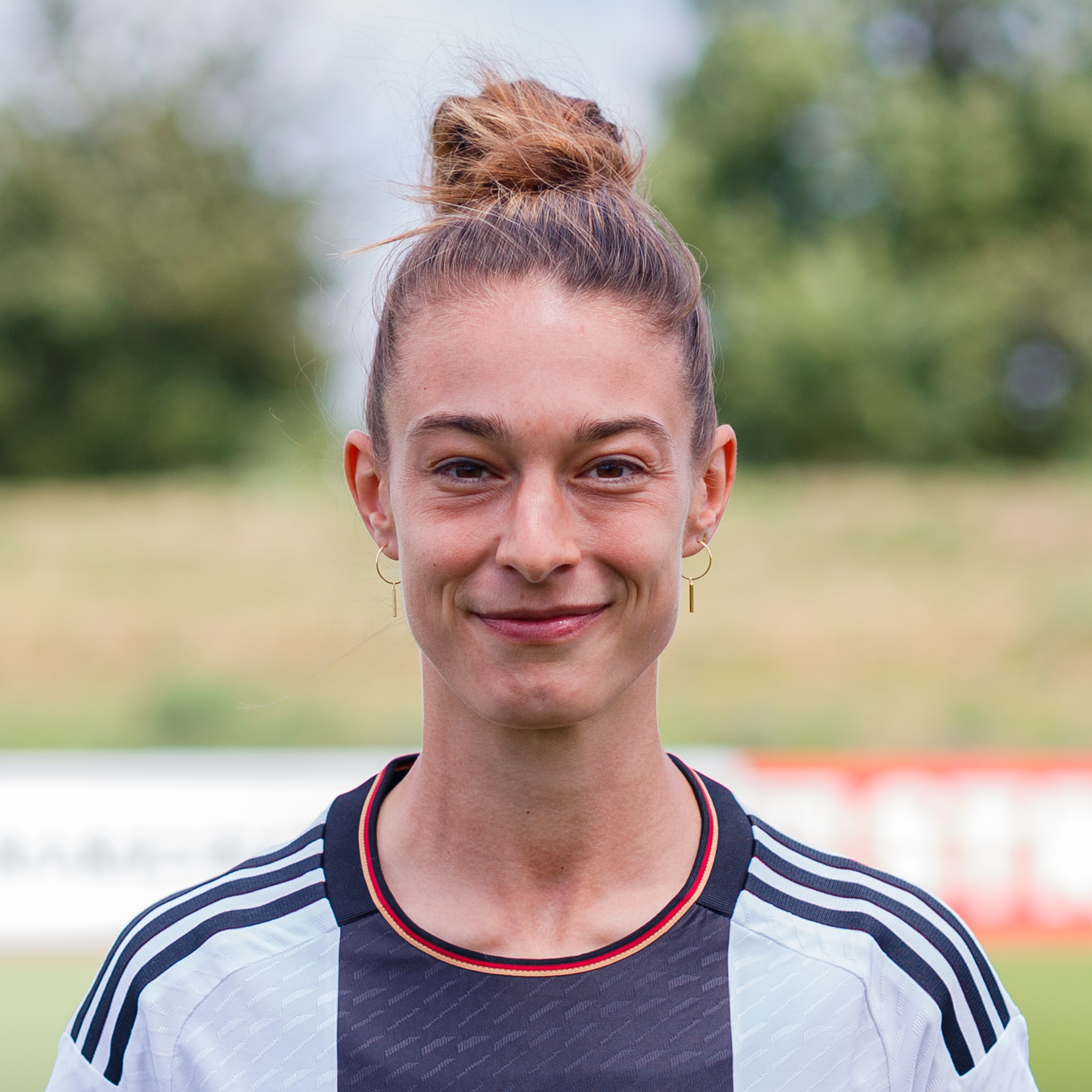
- Rauch with Germany in 2023

Personal information
- Full name: Felicitas Rauch
- Date of birth: 30 April 1996 (age 30)
- Place of birth: Hann. Münden, Germany
- Height: 1.70 m (5 ft 7 in)
- Positions: Midfielder; full-back; winger

Team information
- Current team: North Carolina Courage
- Number: 11

Youth career
- 1999–2002: TSV Eintracht Dungelbeck
- 2002–2010: VfB Peine
- 2010–2013: Turbine Potsdam

Senior career*
Years	Team	Apps	(Gls)
2012–2015	Turbine Potsdam II	35	(6)
2014–2019	Turbine Potsdam	89	(22)
2019–2023	VfL Wolfsburg	54	(6)
2024–	North Carolina Courage	58	(3)

International career^{‡}
2012	Germany U-16	6	(0)
2012–2014	Germany U-17	8	(0)
2013–2015	Germany U-19	16	(2)
2014	Germany U-20	11	(0)
2015–	Germany	50	(5)
Medal record
Olympic Games
Bronze medal – third place	2024 Paris	Team
UEFA Women's Championship
Silver medal – second place	2022 England
- * Club domestic league appearances and goals as of 06:56, 8 November 2026 (UTC) ‡ National team caps and goals as of 19:45, 25 February 2025 (UTC)

Felicitas Rauch (born 30 April 1996) is a German professional footballer who plays as a defender for the North Carolina Courage of the National Women's Soccer League (NWSL) and the Germany national team. She previously played for Frauen-Bundesliga clubs Turbine Potsdam and VfL Wolfsburg.

Rauch won a bronze medal with Germany at the 2024 Summer Olympics.

== Club career ==
Rauch grew up in Peine-Dungelbeck and began playing football with her brother in 1999 at TSV Dungelbeck. From 2002 to 2010 she played for VfB Peine, consistently in boys' teams. In 2010 she moved to Berlin with her family, where she joined the youth department of Turbine Potsdam. In 2012 she became German runner-up with Potsdam's B-Juniors after a 3–2 final defeat against TSG 1899 Hoffenheim and was part of the squad for the second division team from the 2012/13 season.

After winning the 2nd Bundesliga North championship with this team in the 2013/14 season, Rauch was promoted to the first team in the summer of 2014. On 21 September 2014 (day three) she came on as a substitute in the 2–1 win against 1. FFC Frankfurt in the 81st minute for Nataša Andonova and thus celebrated her Bundesliga debut. On 21 February 2019, Rauch announced on she was leaving Potsdam after nine years. She signed a contract with VfL Wolfsburg. In May 2022, Rauch extended her contract with Wolfsburg through June 2025.

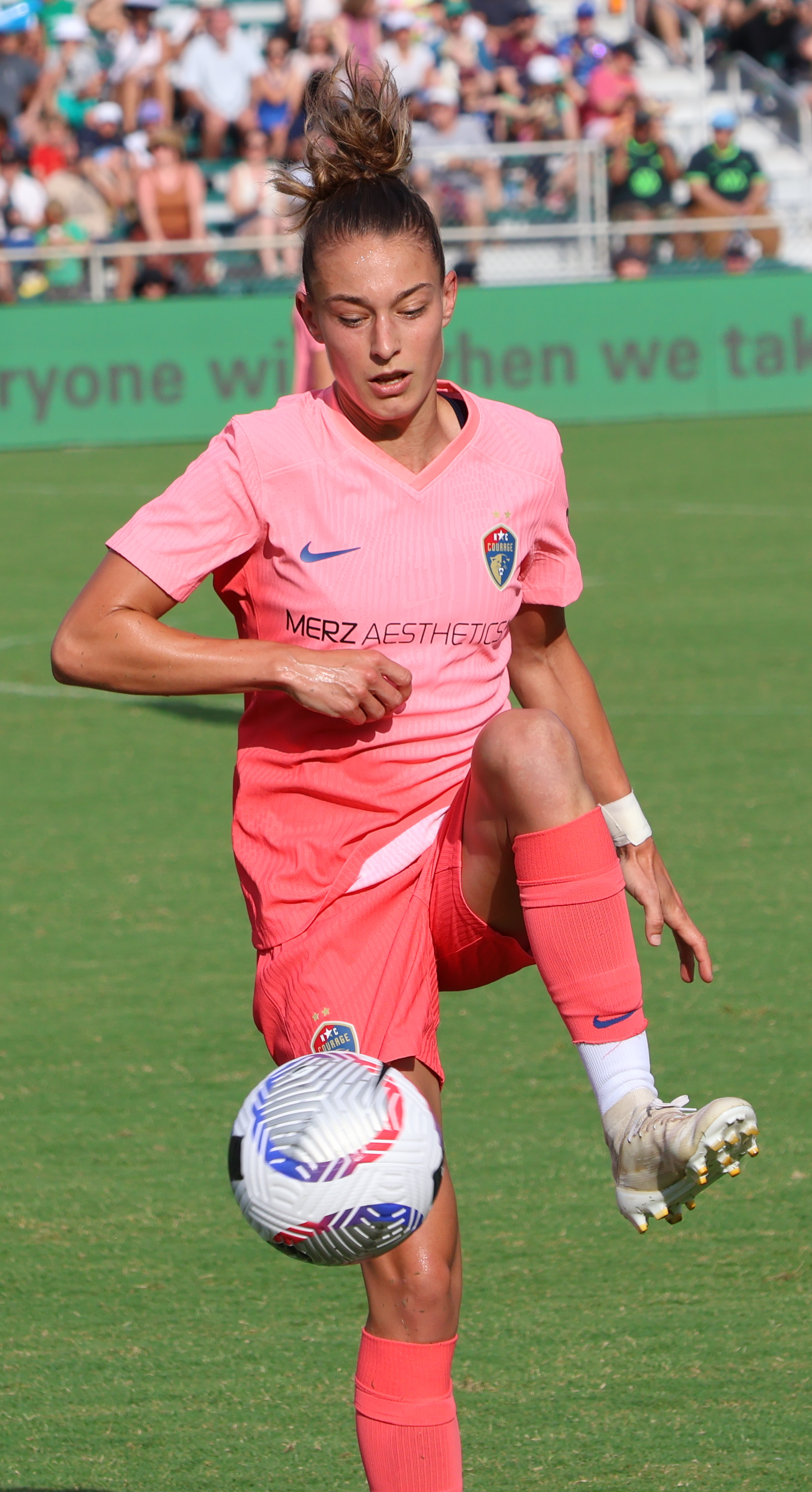
Rauch with the Courage in 2024

Rauch was acquired for a fee by the North Carolina Courage on 17 January 2024 as a replacement for Emily Fox at left back. She debuted in the starting lineup of the opening matchday against the Houston Dash on 16 March. She scored her first NWSL goal in a 4–1 away win over the San Diego Wave on 8 September.

== International career ==
Rauch made her debut for the U16 national team in 2012 and was used for the U17 national team, among other things, as part of the qualification for the 2013 European Championship. After missing out on qualifying for the finals of the 2014 European Championship with the U19 national team, she took part in the summer of 2014 with the U20 national team at the U20 World Cup, which was held in Canada in August. There she played all six tournament games and became world champion with a 1–0 victory in overtime in the final against Nigeria.

On 17 November 2015, she was called up by Germany coach Silvia Neid in the senior squad for the international match against England, against whom she made her first appearance on 26 November 2015 in a goalless draw. She scored her first international goal on 3 September 2019 in Lviv in the 8–0 win in the second European Championship qualifier in Group I over Ukraine, scoring 3–0 in the 32nd minute.

Rauch was named in the Germany squad for the Euro 2022 by national coach Martina Voss-Tecklenburg. The German team reached the final, but lost to England and finished as runners-up. Rauch was used in five games.

Rauch represented Germany at the 2023 FIFA Women's World Cup. She appeared in the opening game against Morocco but then injured her knee in training and had to pull out of the tournament.

Rauch was originally an alternate for Germany at the 2024 Summer Olympics but was called up to replace Sarai Linder on the main squad due to illness during the group stage. She started the remaining five games for Germany, winning a bronze medal.

== Personal life ==
Rauch came out as a lesbian in 2023.

== Career statistics ==
As of 25 February 2025

Appearances and goals by national team and year
National team	Year	Apps	Goals
Germany	2015	1	0
Germany	2016	1	0
Germany	2017	2	0
Germany	2018	2	0
Germany	2019	5	1
Germany	2020	3	0
Germany	2021	4	1
Germany	2022	11	2
Germany	2023	7	0
Germany	2024	12	1
Germany	2025	2	0
Total		50	5

Scores and results list Germany's goal tally first, score column indicates score after each Rauch goal.

List of international goals scored by Felicitas Rauch
No.	Date	Venue	Opponent	Score	Result	Competition
1	3 September 2019	Lviv, Ukraine	Ukraine	3–0	8–0	UEFA Women's Euro 2021 qualifying
2	26 October 2021	Essen, Germany	Israel	7–0	7–0	2023 FIFA Women's World Cup qualification
3	9 April 2022	Bielefeld, Germany	Portugal	3–0	3–0	2023 FIFA Women's World Cup qualification
4	3 September 2022	Bursa, Turkey	Turkey	1–0	3–0	2023 FIFA Women's World Cup qualification
5	2 December 2024	Bochum, Germany	Italy	1–1	1–2	Friendly

== Honours ==
1. FFC Turbine Potsdam II

- 2. Frauen-Bundesliga: 2013–14

VfL Wolfsburg

- Frauen-Bundesliga: 2019–20
- DFB-Pokal Frauen: 2019–20, 2020–21

Germany U20

- FIFA U-20 Women's World Cup: 2014

Germany

- Summer Olympics bronze medal: 2024
- UEFA Women's Championship runner-up: 2022

Individual

- Silbernes Lorbeerblatt: 2024
