= Sara Doorsoun =

German footballer

Sara Doorsoun Khajeh
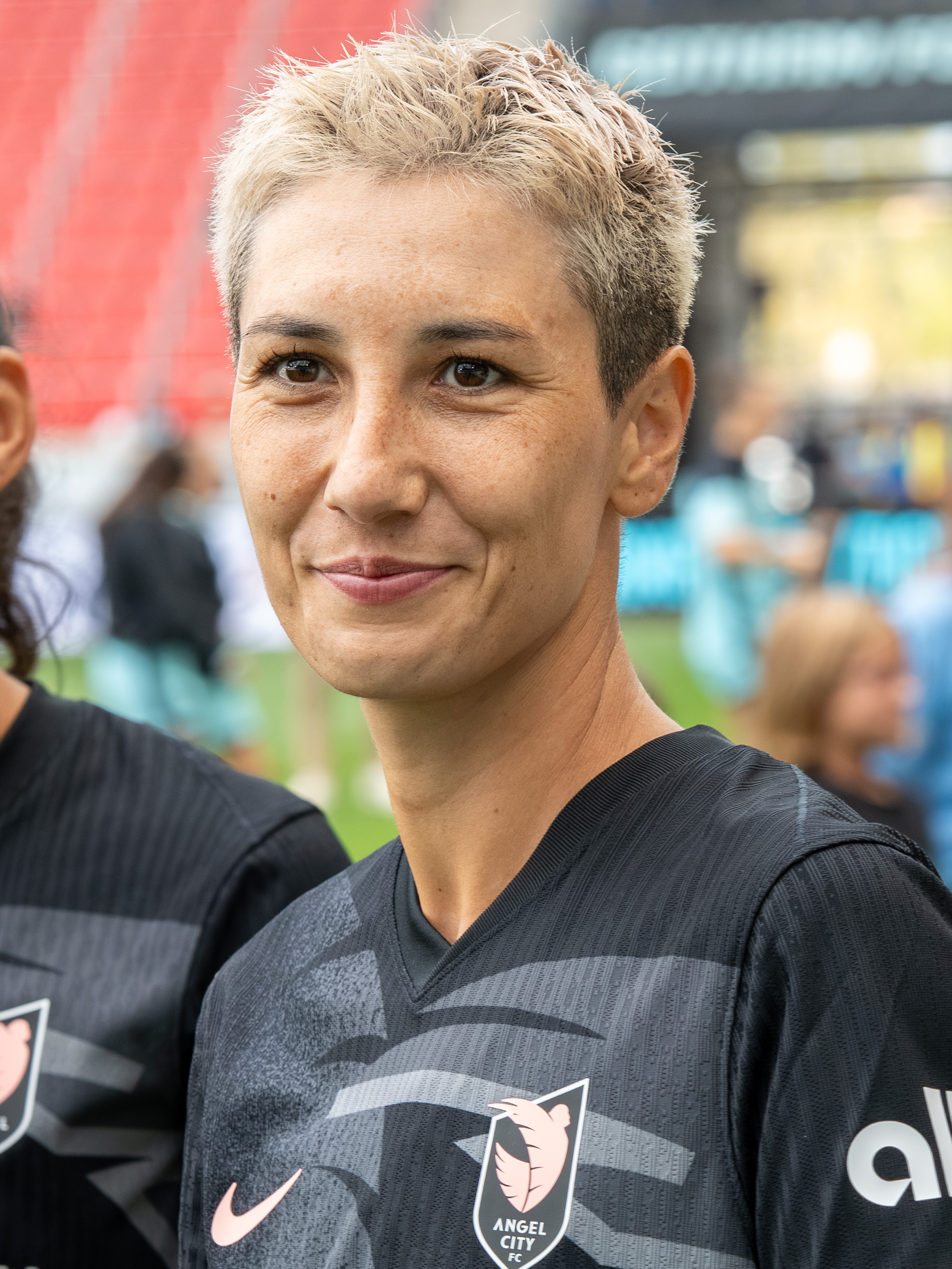
- Doorsoun with Angel City FC in 2025

Personal information
- Full name: Sara Doorsoun-Khajeh
- Date of birth: 17 November 1991 (age 34)
- Place of birth: Cologne, Germany
- Height: 1.72 m (5 ft 8 in)
- Position: Defender

Team information
- Current team: Eintracht Frankfurt
- Number: 23

Youth career
- SV Wesseling
- SpVgg Köttingen
- Fortuna Köln

Senior career*
Years	Team	Apps	(Gls)
2007–2008	Fortuna Köln	12	(6)
2008–2010	SG Wattenscheid 09	31	(4)
2010–2012	Bad Neuenahr	52	(2)
2012–2013	Turbine Potsdam	14	(1)
2013–2018	SGS Essen	100	(15)
2018–2022	VfL Wolfsburg	45	(1)
2021	VfL Wolfsburg II	1	(0)
2022–2025	Eintracht Frankfurt	69	(8)
2025	Angel City FC	8	(0)
2026–	Eintracht Frankfurt	17	(0)

International career
2006	Germany U15	3	(1)
2006–2007	Germany U17	4	(0)
2009–2010	Germany U19	3	(0)
2016–2025	Germany	59	(1)
Medal record
Representing Germany
Olympic Games
Bronze medal – third place	2024 Paris	Team
UEFA Women's Championship
Silver medal – second place	2022 England
UEFA Women's Nations League
Bronze medal – third place	2024 France–Netherlands–Spain
- * Club domestic league appearances and goals as of 21 October 2026

Sara Doorsoun-Khajeh (Persian: سارا دورسون خواجه, Turkish: Sara Dursun; born 17 November 1991) is a German professional footballer who plays as a defender for Frauen-Bundesliga club Eintracht Frankfurt. She also played for the German national team.

== Club career ==
=== VfL Wolfsburg ===
In her debut season with VfL Wolfsburg, Doorsoun won the 2018–19 Frauen-Bundesliga and the DFB-Pokal. She won the Frauen-Bundesliga and DFB-Pokal again the following season with Wolfsburg. Doorsoun has featured for Wolfsburg during the 2019–20 UEFA Women's Champions League knockout phase, including playing in the 2020 UEFA Women's Champions League Final against Olympique Lyonnais.

=== Eintracht Frankfurt ===
On 25 April 2023, Doorsoun signed a two year contract with the club. On 7 March 2025, she extended her contract further until 30 June 2026.

=== Angel City ===
On 22 July 2025, it was announced by Angel City FC of the National Women's Soccer League that the club had signed Doorsoun to a contract through 2026. Doorsoun made her NWSL debut with Angel City on 7 September 2025, coming on a substitute for Megan Reid in a 1–3 defeat to Gotham FC. Doorsoun started her first match for Angel City the following week on 13 September 2025 against North Carolina Courage.

=== Return to Eintracht Frankfurt ===
After six months at Angel City, Doorsoun returned to Eintracht Frankfurt, citing homesickness as one of the key reasons for her decision.

== International career ==
Having represented Germany from the under-15 level up, Doorsoun made her debut for the senior team in 2016 during a 1–0 win over Hungary. She has been called up for the 2016, 2017, and 2018 editions of the SheBelieves Cup, as well as the UEFA Women's Euro 2017 where she played in their 2–0 win over Russia and quarter-final match against Denmark. After providing two assists during Germany's World Cup qualification campaign, she was called into their squad for the 2019 FIFA Women's World Cup.

Doorsoun scored her first goal for the senior national team on 31 August 2019 in a UEFA Women's Euro 2022 qualifying match against Montenegro. On 18 June 2022, she was named in Germany's final UEFA Women's Euro 2022 squad. Doorsoun helped Germany reach the UEFA Women's Euro 2022 Final against England with a 2–1 win over France in the semi-final on 27 July 2022. On 31 May 2023, Doorsoun was named in Germany's preliminary squad for the 2023 FIFA Women's World Cup, and was named in their final 23-player squad on 8 July. In July 2024, Doorsoun was named in Germany's squad for the 2024 Summer Olympics.

In June 2025, she announced her retirement from international football.

== Personal life ==
Doorsoun-Khajeh was born in Cologne to an Iranian father and a Turkish mother.

In 2021, Doorsoun began dating Princess Charming winner Lou Schaaf. Doorsoun confirmed their split in December 2022.

== Career statistics ==
=== Club ===
As of 11 November 2026

Appearances and goals by club, season and competition
Club	Season	League			National cup		League cup		Continental		Total	
Club	Season	Division	Apps	Goals	Apps	Goals	Apps	Goals	Apps	Goals	Apps	Goals
SG Wattenscheid 09	2008–09	2. Frauen-Bundesliga	22	2	3	0	—		—		25	2
SG Wattenscheid 09	2009–10	2. Frauen-Bundesliga	9	2	3	1	—		—		12	3
SG Wattenscheid 09	Total		31	4	6	1	—		—		37	5
Bad Neuenahr	2009–10	Frauen-Bundesliga	10	0	0	0	—		—		10	0
Bad Neuenahr	2010–11	Frauen-Bundesliga	20	0	4	1	—		—		24	1
Bad Neuenahr	2011–12	Frauen-Bundesliga	22	2	2	0	5	0	—		29	2
Bad Neuenahr	Total		52	2	6	1	5	0	—		63	3
Turbine Potsdam	2012–13	Frauen-Bundesliga	14	1	3	0	—		4	0	21	1
SGS Essen	2013–14	Frauen-Bundesliga	22	3	5	2	—		—		27	5
SGS Essen	2014–15	Frauen-Bundesliga	16	4	2	0	—		—		18	4
SGS Essen	2015–16	Frauen-Bundesliga	22	3	2	2	—		—		24	5
SGS Essen	2016–17	Frauen-Bundesliga	21	3	2	2	—		—		23	5
SGS Essen	2017–18	Frauen-Bundesliga	19	2	2	0	—		—		21	2
SGS Essen	Total		100	15	13	6	—		—		113	21
VfL Wolfsburg	2018–19	Frauen-Bundesliga	18	0	2	0	—		4	0	24	0
VfL Wolfsburg	2019–20	Frauen-Bundesliga	12	0	2	0	—		5	0	19	0
VfL Wolfsburg	2020–21	Frauen-Bundesliga	10	1	3	0	—		6	0	19	1
VfL Wolfsburg	2021–22	Frauen-Bundesliga	5	0	—		—		5	0	10	0
VfL Wolfsburg	Total		45	1	7	0	—		20	0	72	1
VfL Wolfsburg II	2021–22	2. Frauen-Bundesliga	1	0	—						1	0
Eintracht Frankfurt	2021–22	Frauen-Bundesliga	9	0	0	0	—		—		9	0
Eintracht Frankfurt	2022–23	Frauen-Bundesliga	21	1	1	0	—		2	0	24	1
Eintracht Frankfurt	2023–24	Frauen-Bundesliga	21	3	3	0	—		8	0	32	3
Eintracht Frankfurt	2024–25	Frauen-Bundesliga	18	4	3	0	—		2	0	23	4
Eintracht Frankfurt	Total		69	8	7	0	—		12	0	79	8
Angel City FC	2025	NWSL	3	0	—		—		—		3	0
Eintracht Frankfurt	2025–26	Frauen-Bundesliga	12	0	—		—		2	0 (Note: appearances in UEFA Women's Europa Cup)	14	0
Eintracht Frankfurt	2026–27	Frauen-Bundesliga	5	0	0	0	—		5	0 (Note: Two appearances in UEFA Women's Champions League qualifying rounds and three appearances in UEFA Women's Europa Cup)	10	0
Eintracht Frankfurt	Total		17	0	0	0	—		7	0	24	0
Career total			332	31	42	8	5	0	43	0	421	39

=== International ===
Appearances and goals by national team and year
National team	Year	Apps	Goals
Germany	2016	4	0
Germany	2017	7	0
Germany	2018	10	0
Germany	2019	12	1
Germany	2020	1	0
Germany	2021	1	0
Germany	2022	7	0
Germany	2023	8	0
Germany	2024	8	0
Germany	2025	1	0
Total		59	1

Scores and results list Germany's goal tally first, score column indicates score after each Doorsoun goal.

List of international goals scored by Sara Doorsoun
No.	Date	Venue	Opponent	Score	Result	Competition
1	31 August 2019	Auestadion, Kassel, Germany	Montenegro	6–0	10–0	UEFA Women's Euro 2021 qualifying

== Honours ==
VfL Wolfsburg

- Frauen-Bundesliga: 2018–19, 2019–20
- DFB-Pokal: 2018–19, 2019–20, 2020–21
- UEFA Women's Champions League runner-up: 2019–2020

Germany

- Summer Olympics bronze medal: 2024
- UEFA Women's Championship runner-up: 2022
- UEFA Women's Nations League third place: 2023–24

Individual

- Silbernes Lorbeerblatt: 2024
