= Angelina Lübcke =

German footballer (born 1991)

Personal information
- Date of birth: 24 February 1991 (age 35)
- Place of birth: Hamburg, Germany
- Height: 1.71 m (5 ft 7 in)
- Position: Striker

Team information
- Current team: Türkiyemspor Berlin

Youth career
- 2007: USC Paloma Hamburg

Senior career*
Years	Team	Apps	(Gls)
2007–2011	Hamburger SV	45	(0)
2007–2011	Hamburger SV II	33	(3)
2011–2013	1. FC Lokomotive Leipzig	41	(10)
2013	SC Sand	0	(0)
2013–2017	FFV Leipzig	40	(12)
2013	FFV Leipzig II	22	(13)
2017–2022	FC Phoenix Leipzig		
2022–	Türkiyemspor Berlin		(17)

International career
2008	Germany U17	1	(0)
2009	Germany U19	4	(0)
2009–2010	Germany U20	3	(0)
2012	Germany U23	1	(0)
- * Club domestic league appearances and goals as of 2 May 2023

Angelina Lübcke (born 24 February 1991) is a German footballer who plays as a striker for women's Regionalliga Nordost club Türkiyemspor Berlin.

== Club career ==
Lübcke played in her adolescence at USC Paloma. At age 16, she played with Bundesliga club Hamburger SV for the 2007–08 season.

Her first Bundesliga appearance was on a 4 November 2007 (fifth round) goalless draw at TSV Crailsheim. After four seasons with Hamburg, for which she played 45 league matches, she moved to Bundesliga club 1. FC Lokomotive Leipzig for the 2011–12 season. On 15 April 2012 (17th round) playing at home against VfL Wolfsburg, she scored her only Bundesliga goal in the match's first minute, though in what would be a 9–2 loss. The club was then relegated to 2. Frauen-Bundesliga Nord, where in the 2012–13 2. Frauen-Bundesliga season Lübcke appeared in 21 league games and scored nine goals.

For the 2013–14 season, she signed a contract with second-division SC Sand. However, the change did not come into being, and she returned to 1. FC Lokomotive Leipzig (now FFV Leipzig) where she remained until 2017 when FFV Leipzig went bankrupt.

=== Founding of FC Phoenix Leipzig ===
After FFV Leipzig withdrew from competition due to its financial problems, former players Katharina Freitag, Marlene Ebermann, Safi Nyembo, and Lübcke founded and played for FC Phoenix Leipzig, which was established in the bottom-most fifth-division Saxony state league. The players initially investigated acquiring FFV Leipzig's license but were unable to take on the club's debt. Lübcke joined the effort to continue her ambition to play professionally. In her first 22 Phoenix Leipzig appearances Lübcke scored 45 goals, including the stoppage-time match-winning goal that knocked third-division RB Leipzig out of the Saxony Cup in 2017, a four-goal match against DFC Westsachsen Zwickau in 2019, and the deciding goals in Phoenix Leipzig's promotion match against SC Staaken to the third-division Regionalliga Nordost in 2019. Phoenix Leipzig went undefeated in league play during that span and won the double in 2019 by defeating RB Leipzig at the state Supercup finals in a penalty shoot-out. Lübcke was also named to the Supercup's team of the tournament.

FC Phoenix Leipzig also qualified for the 2020–21 DFB-Pokal Frauen. In 2020, they reached the Saxony Cup final against well-funded higher-tier club RB Leipzig. Despite losing 6–0, RB Leipzig qualified for the DFB-Pokal through winning promotion to 2. Frauen-Bundesliga, leaving the Saxony Cup qualification slot to Phoenix. Phoenix Leipzig were unable to advance past the first round of the 2020–21 DFB-Pokal Frauen, falling 3–1 to 1. FFC Erfurt, though Lübcke scored Phoenix's only goal.

In 2022, FC Phoenix Leipzig dissolved due to financial difficulties and a lack of youth players related to the COVID-19 pandemic.

=== After Phoenix Leipzig ===
Lübcke now plays for Türkiyemspor Berlin's women's side, which also plays in Regionalliga Nordost. On 6 June 2022, Lübcke played in Türkiyemspor's 2–0 finals loss against FC Viktoria 1889 Berlin in Berlin Football Association's Polytan Cup, though Türkiyemspor had already qualified for the 2022–23 DFB-Pokal Frauen by finishing second in the regionalliga behind ineligible Turbine Potsdam II. Lübcke scored a goal in Türkiyemspor's 6–1 first-round victory over Eimsbütteler TV in the DFB-Pokal but lost 6–0 to RB Leipzig.

== International career ==
Lübcke played for the German under-17 national team at the 2008 FIFA U-17 Women's World Cup in New Zealand. She debuted on 16 November in the third-place match, a 3–0 win over England, as a substitute for Leonie Maier in the 89th minute. In 2008, she earned four caps for the under-19 national team, then by 2010 three matches for the under-20 national team.

In 2012, she was part of the under-23 national team in its 2–0 win over Sweden's under-23 team.

== Personal life ==
Outside of football, Lübcke worked as a nurse in intensive care.

== Honours ==
- FIFA U-17 Women's World Cup: Third place 2008
