= Lena Oberdorf =

German footballer (born 2001)

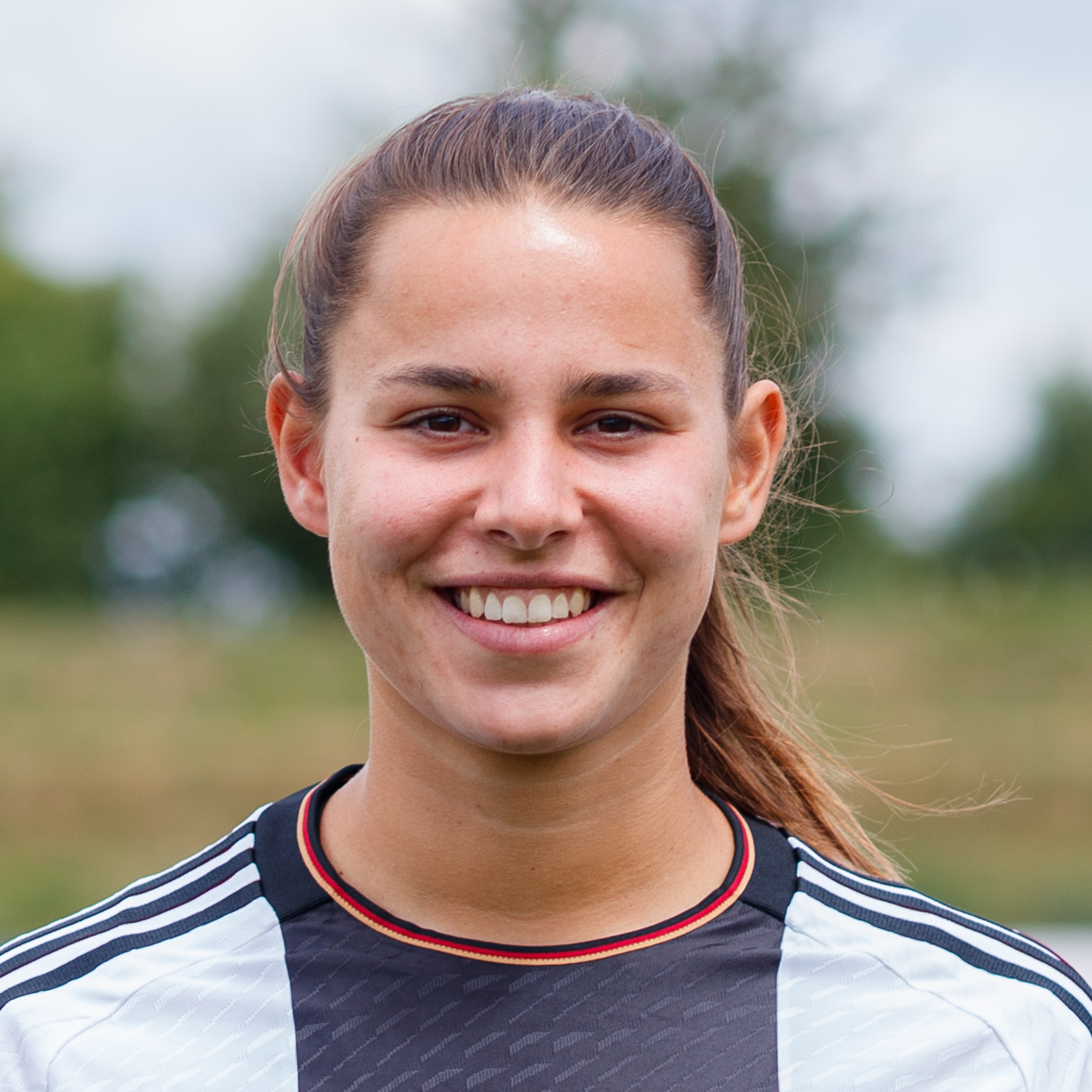
- Oberdorf with Germany in 2023

Personal information
- Full name: Lena Sophie Oberdorf
- Date of birth: 19 December 2001 (age 24)
- Place of birth: Gevelsberg, Germany
- Height: 1.74 m (5 ft 9 in)
- Positions: Midfielder; centre-back

Team information
- Current team: Bayern Munich
- Number: 8

Youth career
- TuS Ennepetal
- TSG Sprockhövel

Senior career*
Years	Team	Apps	(Gls)
2018–2020	SGS Essen	36	(12)
2020–2024	VfL Wolfsburg	71	(17)
2024–	Bayern Munich	7	(3)

International career^{‡}
2014–2016	Germany U15	12	(6)
2016	Germany U16	4	(3)
2016–2017	Germany U17	13	(2)
2017–2018	Germany U19	6	(3)
2018	Germany U20	4	(1)
2019–	Germany	51	(4)
Medal record
UEFA Women's Championship
Runner-up	2022 England
UEFA Women's Nations League
Third place	2024
- * Club domestic league appearances and goals as of 6 September 2026 ‡ National team caps and goals as of 22:29, 16 July 2024 (UTC)

Lena Sophie Oberdorf (born 19 December 2001) is a German professional footballer who plays as a midfielder for Bundesliga club Bayern Munich and the Germany national team. A versatile player who can play in various positions ranging from centre-back, left-back, defensive midfielder, and central midfielder, Oberdorf is considered one of the most promising young talents in women's football.

== Early life ==
Lena Sophie Oberdorf was born on 19 December 2001 in Gevelsberg, Germany. Both of Oberdorf's parents were professional footballers, with her dad a professional footballer. She has an older brother, Fortuna Düsseldorf player Tim Oberdorf, and an older sister, Julia, who plays American football.

Oberdorf played on, and captained, boys' football teams in her youth. Oberdorf started football at TuS Ennepetal. As a D youth, she switched to TSG Sprockhövel, where she was on boys' teams until 2018. She was the only girl in the German youth league she played in, as the captain of TSG Sprockhövel.

== Club career ==
=== SGS Essen ===
In November 2017, Oberdorf signed a three-year contract with Bundesliga club SGS Essen, agreeing to join in the summer of 2018.

She made her SGS debut on 9 September 2018 in DfB-Pokal second round against SV Henstedt-Ulzburg, where she immediately scored two goals in a 14–0 win. Almost a week later, on 15 September 2018 (matchday 1), Oberdorf scored two more goals in a 4–0 away victory against MSV Duisburg in the Frauen-Bundesliga.

=== VfL Wolfsburg ===
Ahead of the 2020–21 season, Oberdorf moved to VfL Wolfsburg. She signed an initial three-year contract, which was extended in the summer of 2022 to 2025.

Her first appearances came at the end of the COVID-delayed 2019–20 UEFA Women's Champions League, in which Wolfsburg lost 3–1 to Lyon in the final. Oberdorf replaced Svenja Huth as a 61st minute substitute.

In Oberdorf's first full season with Wolfsburg, she won the DfB-Pokal, a trophy that Die Wölfinnen remarkably won on four consecutive occasions during her time at the club.

The following year, Lena featured in 17 of Wolfsburg's 22 league matches as they won the 2021–22 Frauen-Bundesliga title. She also helped her side reach the Champions League semi-finals, where they were defeated by Barcelona.

Individually, Oberdorf's top performances for both club and country saw her place fourth in the 2022 Ballon d'Or Féminin award and third in the 2021–22 UEFA Women's Player of the Year ranking. Wolfsburg finished as runners-up in the 2022–23 UEFA Women's Champions League, with Oberdorf playing the whole final as her side lost 3–2 to Barcelona.

During her four-year spell with Wolfsburg, Oberdorf made over 100 appearances for the club in all competitions before a release clause in her contract was triggered.

=== Bayern Munich ===
On 15 February 2024, Bayern Munich announced the signing of Oberdorf, starting from summer that year until 2028. The reported transfer fee made Oberdorf the most expensive female German footballer in history. Due to a severe cruciate and medial collateral ligament injury suffered whilst on international duty, Oberdorf was unable to make any appearances during the 2024–25 season.

In August 2025, she played her first games with Bayern Munich in a series of friendly matches. Oberdorf made her official debut on 30 August 2025 in the 2025 DFB-Supercup Frauen against her former team, VfL Wolfsburg. The Bavarians won 4–2 and Oberdorf clinched her first title with Bayern. On 6 September 2025, Oberdorf played her very first Bundesliga game for Bayern Munich, replacing Georgia Stanway in the 81st minute of the 2–0 home win against Bayer Leverkusen. She made her starting debut for Bayern a week later in the 3–0 win against RB Leipzig, scoring two goals. A month later, on 19 October 2026, she sustained another cruciate ligament tear in her right knee in a match against FC Köln.

On 31 August 2026, 316 days after her second ACL tear, Oberdorf made her return from injury in Bayern's season opener, a 2–0 victory over Mainz. On 9 September 2026, Bayern Munich announced that Oberdorf would miss the ‘‘coming weeks’’ due to a reaction in her right knee.

== International career ==
=== Youth ===
Oberdorf made her national team debut on 28 October 2014 at the age of twelve. She came on for Verena Wieder in the 41st minute of the U-15 national team's 13–0 win against Scotland. Two days later, she scored her first goal in an 8–0 win over Scotland in another friendly.

In July 2016, she took part in the Nordic Cup with the U-16 national team and finished second behind Norway with the team.

Also in 2016, Oberdorf was the youngest player in the 21-player squad of the U17 national team for the World Cup in Jordan. She featured in two group games against Venezuela and Cameroon and against Spain in the quarter-finals, scoring against Cameroon to make it 2–0 and against Spain to make it 2–1. In 2017 she qualified with the team for the European Championship in the Czech Republic and won it after beating Spain 3–1 in the final on penalties. After the tournament, she was voted "Golden Player" by UEFA.

For the U19 national team, she played six games from September 2017 to April 2018 as part of qualifying for the 2018 European Championship, but was already part of the squad in the summer of 2018 for the U20 national team and took part with this – again as the youngest German player – at the World Cup in France.

=== Senior ===
In December 2018, national coach Martina Voss-Tecklenburg called her up to the squad for the senior national team for the winter training camp from 14 to 21 January 2019 in Marbella. She made her debut on 6 April 2019 in Solna in a 2–1 win in a friendly against Sweden, replacing Turid Knaak in the 61st minute. At 17 years and 109 days she is the eighth youngest player to make her debut for the national team. She established herself as a starter for the national team.

Voss-Tecklenburg called her back to the German team for the 2019 World Cup. When she came on as a substitute in the first round match against China, she became the youngest German World Cup player at age 17 years, five months, and 20 days – a record that Birgit Prinz had previously held.

She scored her first international goal on 3 September 2019 in Lviv in the 8–0 victory over Ukraine in the second European Championship qualifier in group I, with her goal making it 4–0 in the 54th minute.

She played for Germany at Euro 2022, including the final on 31 July, in which England won 2-1 after extra-time. Oberdorf played in five of the team's six games, unable to play in the other game due to suspension because of a second yellow card.

Oberdorf was one of the stars of the Euros, producing strong, controlling displays and one assist from a defensive midfield role. After her fantastic showing, the 20-year-old was recognised as the Young Player of the Tournament and voted into the "Eleven of the Tournament" by the UEFA coaching staff.

On 16 July 2024, she sustained a knee injury during a 4–0 victory over Austria in the last match of the UEFA Euro 2025 qualifying, which forced her to miss the 2024 Summer Olympics. She later missed the UEFA Women's Euro 2025 as a result of the same injury.

== Personal life ==
Oberdorf was in a relationship with Kimberly Simmler until December 2023 and had spoken about the greater acceptance of same-sex couples in women's football compared to the men's game. Oberdorf is currently in a relationship with former Bayern Munich teammate Natalia Padilla.

== Career statistics ==
=== Club ===
As of match played 6 September 2026

Appearances and goals by club, season and competition
Club	Season	League			DFB Pokal		Continental (Note: includes UEFA Women's Champions League)		Other (Note: Includes DFB-Supercup)		Total	
Club	Season	Division	Apps	Goals	Apps	Goals	Apps	Goals	Apps	Goals	Apps	Goals
SGS Essen	2018–19	Frauen-Bundesliga	16	9	2	2	–		–		18	11
SGS Essen	2019–20	Frauen-Bundesliga	20	3	4	0	–		–		24	3
SGS Essen	Total		36	12	6	2	–		–		42	14
VfL Wolfsburg	2019–20	Frauen-Bundesliga	–		–		3 (Note: Joined during 2020–21 season but competed in the postponed 2019–20 UEFA Women's Champions League)	0	–		3	0
VfL Wolfsburg	2020–21	Frauen-Bundesliga	20	7	5	4	3	1	–		28	12
VfL Wolfsburg	2021–22	Frauen-Bundesliga	17	2	4	1	9	0	–		30	3
VfL Wolfsburg	2022–23	Frauen-Bundesliga	17	3	4	0	8	0	–		29	3
VfL Wolfsburg	2023–24	Frauen-Bundesliga	17	5	3	1	2	0	–		22	6
VfL Wolfsburg	Total		71	17	16	6	25	1	–		112	24
Bayern Munich	2024–25	Frauen-Bundesliga	0	0	0	0	0	0	0	0	0	0
Bayern Munich	2025–26	Frauen-Bundesliga	5	3	1	0	1	0	1	0	8	3
Bayern Munich	2026–27	Frauen-Bundesliga	2	0	0	0	0	0	0	0	2	0
Bayern Munich	Total		7	3	1	0	1	0	1	0	10	3
Career total			114	32	23	8	26	1	1	0	164	41

=== International ===
As of 16 July 2024

Appearances and goals by national team and year
National team	Year	Apps	Goals
Germany	2019	12	2
Germany	2020	4	0
Germany	2021	7	0
Germany	2022	12	1
Germany	2023	9	0
Germany	2024	6	1
Total		51	4

Scores and results list Germany's goal tally first, score column indicates score after each Oberdorf goal.

List of international goals scored by Lena Oberdorf
No.	Date	Venue	Opponent	Score	Result	Competition
1	3 September 2019	Arena Lviv, Lviv, Ukraine	Ukraine	4–0	8–0	UEFA Women's Euro 2021 qualifying
2	8 October 2019	Kleanthis Vikelidis Stadium, Thessaloniki, Greece	Greece	5–0	2–0	UEFA Women's Euro 2021 qualifying
3	9 April 2022	Bielefelder Alm, Bielefeld, Germany	Portugal	1–0	3–0	2023 FIFA Women's World Cup qualification
4	9 April 2024	Tivoli, Aachen, Germany	Iceland	3–1	3–1	UEFA Women's Euro 2025 qualifying

== Honours ==
VfL Wolfsburg

- Frauen-Bundesliga: 2021–22, 2024–25
- DFB-Pokal Frauen: 2020–21, 2021–22, 2022–23, 2023–24
- UEFA Women's Champions League runner-up: 2022–23

Bayern Munich

- Bundesliga: 2025–26
- DFB-Pokal: 2025–26
- DFB-Supercup Frauen: 2025

Germany U17

- UEFA U-17 Women's Championship: 2017

Germany

- UEFA Women's Championship runner-up: 2022
- UEFA Women's Nations League third place: 2023–24

Individual

- UEFA Women's Championship Young Player of the Tournament: 2022
- UEFA Women's Championship Team of the Tournament: 2022
- FIFA FIFPRO Women's World 11: 2022
- UEFA Women's Under-17 Championship Best Player: 2017
- Fritz Walter Medal: Gold 2020, Silver 2019, Bronze 2018
- IFFHS Women's World Team: 2022, 2023
- Germany women's national Player of the Year: 2020
