= Jannelle Flaws =

American soccer player

Personal information
- Full name: Jannelle Kalyn Flaws
- Date of birth: November 15, 1991 (age 34)
- Place of birth: Glenview, Illinois
- Height: 5 ft 7 in (1.70 m)
- Position: Forward

College career
Years	Team	Apps	(Gls)
2010–2015	Illinois Fighting Illini	84	(54)

Senior career*
Years	Team	Apps	(Gls)
2016	Chicago Red Stars	1	(0)
2017–2020	BV Cloppenburg	63	(29)
2020–2022	SV Meppen	41	(5)
- * Club domestic league appearances and goals

Jannelle Kalyn Flaws (born November 15, 1991) is an American former soccer player who played as a forward for SV Meppen.

== Club career ==
Flaws was drafted by Chicago Red Stars in the 2016 NWSL College Draft. She made one appearance for Chicago in 2016.

== Career statistics ==
Appearances and goals by club, season and competition
Club	Season	League			Cup (Note: Includes DFB-Pokal Frauen)		Playoffs (Note: Includes NWSL playoffs)		Total	
Club	Season	Division	Apps	Goals	Apps	Goals	Apps	Goals	Apps	Goals
Chicago Red Stars	2016	NWSL	1	0	—		0	0	1	0
BV Cloppenburg	2017–18	2. Frauen-Bundesliga	21	11	2	2	—		23	13
BV Cloppenburg	2018–19	2. Frauen-Bundesliga	26	10	2	2	—		28	12
BV Cloppenburg	2019–20	2. Frauen-Bundesliga	16	8	1	0	—		17	8
SV Meppen	2020–21	Frauen-Bundesliga	20	1	3	4	—		23	5
SV Meppen	2021–22	2. Frauen-Bundesliga	21	4	1	0	—		22	4
Career total			105	34	9	8	0	0	114	42

== Honors ==
Individual

- Big Ten Conference Forward of the Year: 2013, 2014
