= Molli Plasmann =

Danish footballer (born 1997)

Personal information
- Full name: Molli Skonning Plasmann
- Date of birth: 22 April 1997 (age 29)
- Place of birth: Timring, Denmark
- Height: 1.70 m (5 ft 7 in)
- Position: Forward

Team information
- Current team: Thy-Thisted
- Number: 19

Senior career*
Years	Team	Apps	(Gls)
–2021	Kolding		
2021–2022	SC Sand		
2023	Celtic		
2024–2025	FC Midtjylland		
2025–	Thy-Thisted		

International career
2013	Denmark U17	1	(0)
2014	Denmark U19	1	(0)
- * Club domestic league appearances and goals

Molli Plasmann (born 22 April 1997) is a Danish footballer who plays as a forward for B-Liga side FC Thy-Thisted Q.
