= Yvonne Weilharter =

Austrian footballer

Personal information
- Date of birth: 8 December 2000 (age 25)
- Place of birth: Austria
- Height: 1.71 m (5 ft 7 in)
- Position: Defender

Team information
- Current team: Austria Wien

Senior career*
Years	Team	Apps	(Gls)
2019–2020	1. FFC Frankfurt II	2	(0)
2019–2020	1. FFC Frankfurt	11	(0)
2020–2022	RB Leipzig	22	(4)
2022–	Austria Wien	24	(3)

International career^{‡}
2016–2017	Austria U17	6	(0)
2018–	Austria	6	(0)
- * Club domestic league appearances and goals as of 22 May 2025 ‡ National team caps and goals as of 30 August 2019

Yvonne Weilharter (born 8 December 2000) is an Austrian footballer who plays as a defender for Austria Wien and the Austria women's national team.

== Career ==
Weilharter has been capped for the Austria national team, appearing for the team during the 2019 FIFA Women's World Cup qualifying cycle.
