= Franziska Jaser =

German footballer (born 1996)

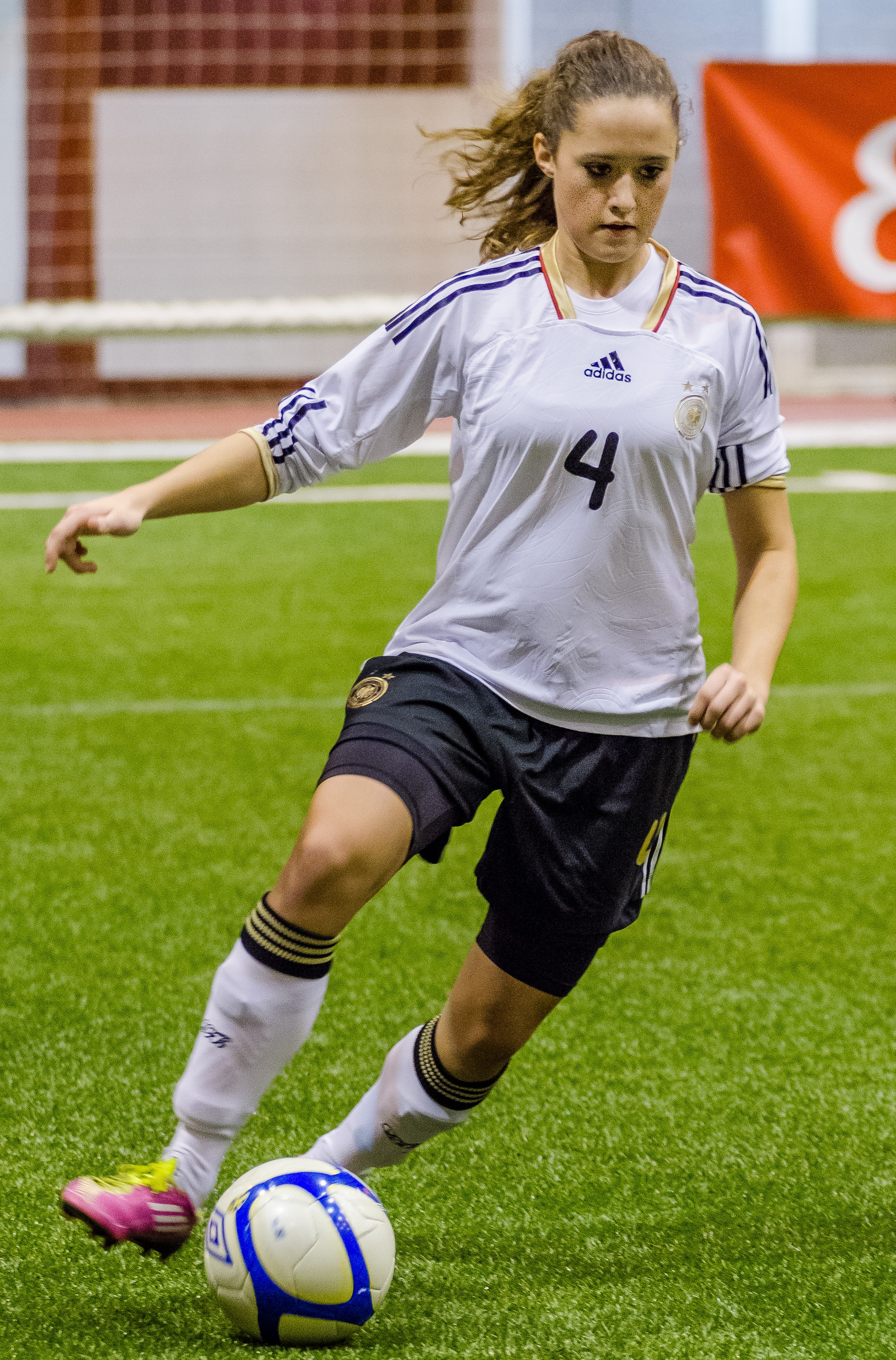
- Jaser in 2012

Personal information
- Full name: Franziska Lena Jaser
- Date of birth: 20 January 1996 (age 30)
- Place of birth: Günzburg, Germany
- Height: 1.72 m (5 ft 8 in)
- Position: Centre-back

Team information
- Current team: Eintracht Frankfurt II
- Number: 25

Youth career
- –2003: Mönstetten
- 2003–2008: Unterknöringen
- 2008–2013: TSG Thannhausen

College career
Years	Team	Apps	(Gls)
2014–2015	NC State Wolfpack	17	(0)

Senior career*
Years	Team	Apps	(Gls)
2013–2014	Bayern Munich	2	(0)
2014	Bayern Munich II	3	(0)
2015–2016	SC Freiburg		
2016–2020	FC Basel	60	(6)
2020–2021	Kristianstads DFF	3	(0)
2021	Werder Bremen	10	(0)
2023–2024	Eintracht Frankfurt III		
2024–	Eintracht Frankfurt II	1	(0)

International career^{‡}
2012	Germany U17	8	(0)
2015	Germany U19	3	(0)
2014	Germany U20	1	(0)
- * Club domestic league appearances and goals as of 1 July 2024 ‡ National team caps and goals as of 29 July 2023

Franziska Lena Jaser (born 20 January 1996) is a German footballer who plays as a centre-back for Eintracht Frankfurt II.

== Honours ==
Basel

- Swiss Super League runner-up: 2017–18

Germany U17

- UEFA Women's Under-17 Championship: 2012

Germany U20

- FIFA U-20 Women's World Cup: 2014
