= Laura Freigang =

German footballer (born 1998)

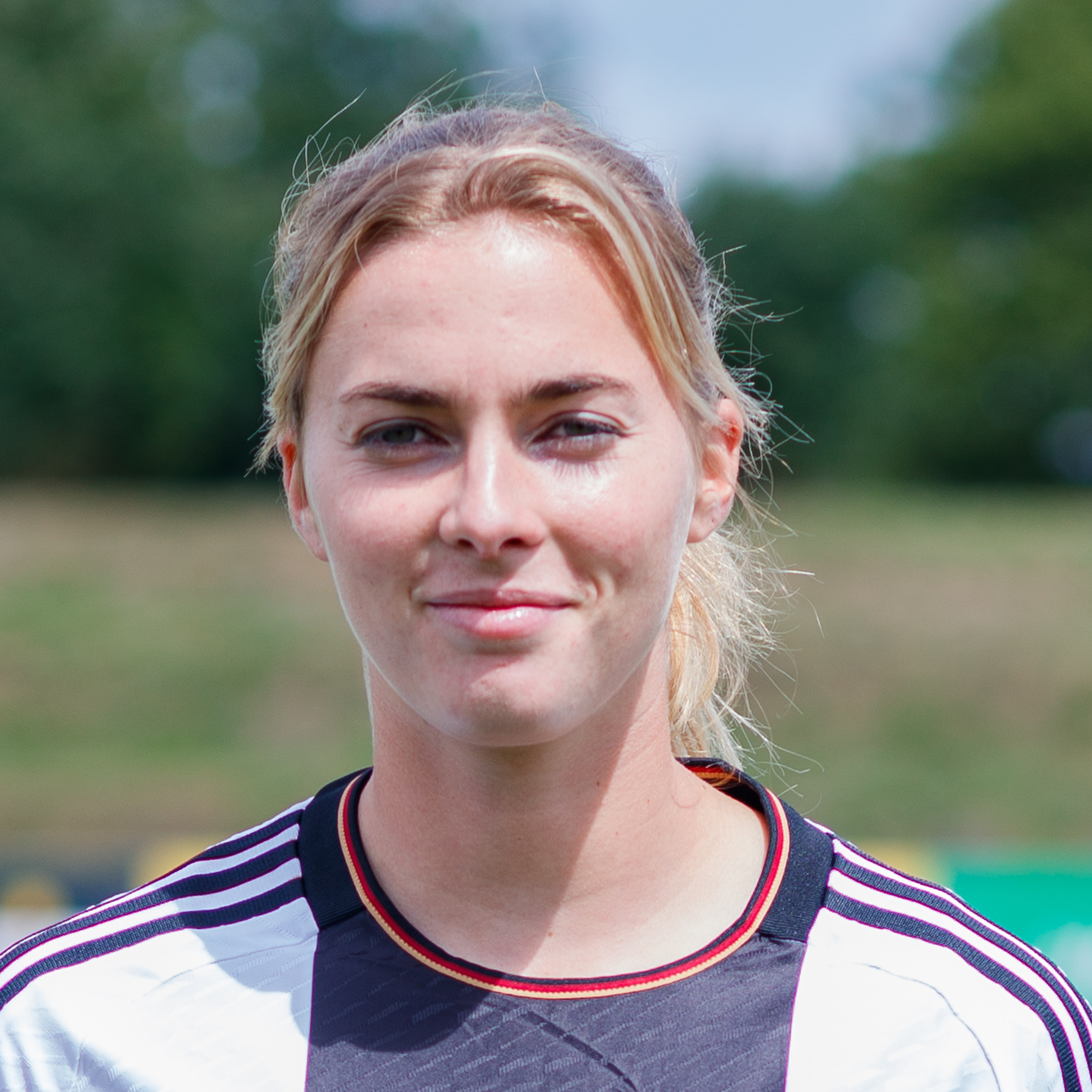
- Freigang with Germany in 2023

Personal information
- Full name: Laura Freigang
- Date of birth: 1 February 1998 (age 28)
- Place of birth: Kiel, Germany
- Height: 1.72 m (5 ft 8 in)
- Position: Forward

Team information
- Current team: Eintracht Frankfurt
- Number: 10

Youth career
- –2011: FSV Oppenheim
- 2011–2014: Holstein Kiel

College career
| Years | Team | Apps | (Gls) |
| 2016–2017 | Penn State Nittany Lions | 37 | (11) |

Senior career*
| Years | Team | Apps | (Gls) |
| 2014–2016 | TSV Schott Mainz | 13 | (4) |
| 2018– | Eintracht Frankfurt | 181 | (105) |

International career^{‡}
| 2013 | Germany U15 | 3 | (1) |
| 2013–2014 | Germany U16 | 7 | (4) |
| 2014 | Germany U17 | 5 | (3) |
| 2015–2017 | Germany U19 | 24 | (16) |
| 2015–2018 | Germany U20 | 17 | (7) |
| 2020– | Germany | 45 | (17) |
Medal record
Olympic Games
| Bronze medal – third place | 2024 Paris | Team |
UEFA Women's Championship
| Silver medal – second place | 2022 England |
UEFA Women's Nations League
| Bronze medal – third place | 2024 France–Netherlands–Spain |
- * Club domestic league appearances and goals as of 21 November 2026 ‡ National team caps and goals as of 21:41, 9 October 2026 (UTC)

Laura Freigang (born 1 February 1998) is a German professional footballer who plays as a forward for Bundesliga club Eintracht Frankfurt and the Germany national team.

== Club career ==
Freigang started playing football at FSV Oppenheim. After nine years, she moved to Holstein Kiel in 2011 due to her family moving. In the 2012/2013 season she made her first appearances in the B junior team in the first-class Bundesliga North/Northeast. She scored two goals on her debut on 3 November 2012 against Werder Bremen. She scored another goal in a total of eight appearances this season. In the following season, Freigang was an integral part of the team and scored 15 goals in 17 Bundesliga appearances, the fifth most in the North/Northeast season.

After three years in Kiel, Freigang moved back to Rhineland-Palatinate in the summer of 2014, to the regional league team TSV Schott Mainz. In her first season she scored 20 goals in 18 games, the third most in the league. With TSV Schott they achieved promotion to the 2nd Bundesliga as undefeated champions. In the following season she scored four goals in 13 second division games.

As of August 2016, Freigang studied at Pennsylvania State University on a sports scholarship and at the same time played for the university's soccer team in the Big Ten Conference. Freigang scored a goal in the first game of the season and was then named Freshman of the Week in the Big Ten Conference.

For the 2018–19 season she moved to Bundesliga club 1. FFC Frankfurt. She finished her first season with Frankfurt in fifth place and scored 10 goals in 20 games. In the second season of 2019–20, she and two other players were the third-best goalscorer in the league with 16 goals in 22 games and finished sixth with Frankfurt.

In July 2020, 1. FFC Frankfurt was integrated into the Eintracht Frankfurt club and formed the club's women's football department. In 2021 she extended her contract early until 2025. In the 2020–21 season she was second in thescorers list behind Nicole Billa with 17 goals.

== International career ==
=== Youth ===
Freigang made her first national appearance in 2013 with the U15 national team. She scored four goals in seven international matches for the U16 team. She scored two goals at the Nordic Cup for the U16 national teams in 2014, including the 2-0 goal in the final win against Sweden. She was appointed to the U17 national team squad for the first time at the 2014 U17 World Cup in Costa Rica. She came on as a substitute in two group games. In the other games for the U17 team she scored three goals.

In 2015 she made her debut for the U19 national team, for which she took part in three European Championships in 2015, 2016, and 2017. She scored a total of two goals and reached the semi-finals in 2015 and 2017. In total, Freigang played 24 international matches for the U19 team, in which she scored 16 goals.

Freigang played her first game for the U20 national team in October 2015. In 2016 and 2018 she and her team reached the quarterfinals of the U20 World Cup. She scored two goals during the 2018 tournament. Freigang scored seven goals in 17 international matches for the U20 team.

=== Senior ===
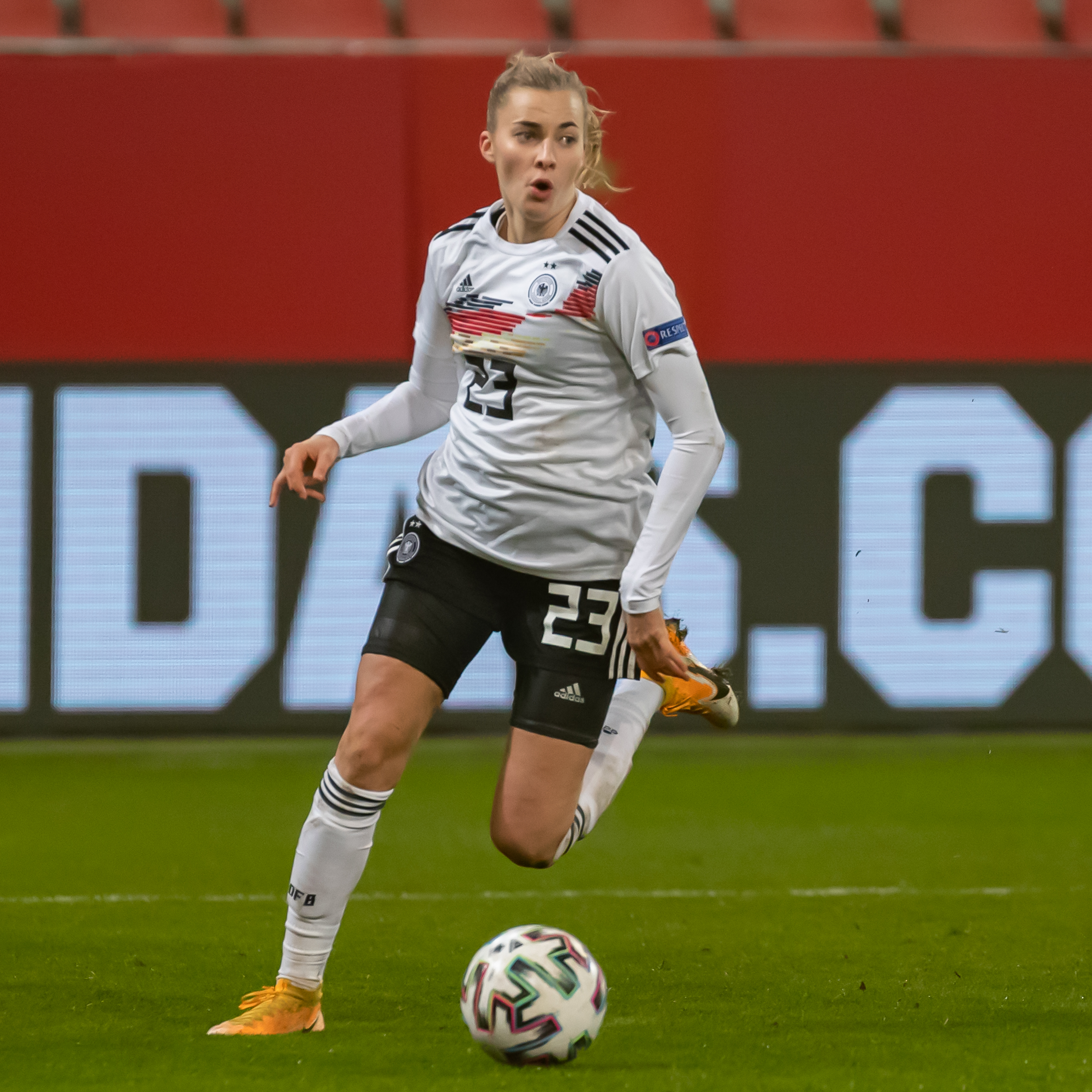
Laura Freigang in November 2020

She made her senior national team debut on 7 March 2020, coming on as a substitute for Linda Dallmann in the 73rd minute in the Algarve Cup semi-final against Norway. She scored her first international goal on 22 September 2020 in a 3–0 win in the European Championship qualifier against the national team of Montenegro to make it 1–0 in the second minute. In her third international match on 27 November 2020, she scored a hat trick in a 6–0 win in the European Championship qualifier against Greece.

She was named to the squad by national coach Martina Voss-Tecklenburg for the 2022 European Championship in England. Germany reached the final, but lost to England and became European runners-up. Freigang was used in one game.

Freigang was called back into the squad for the 2023 World Cup and played a short seven-minute appearance in the 6–0 win against World Cup newcomers Morocco, but was eliminated with Germany in the preliminary round.

On 3 July 2024, Freigang was called up to the Germany squad for the 2024 Summer Olympics.

On 12 June 2025, Freigang was called up to the Germany squad for the UEFA Women's Euro 2025.

== Personal life ==
Freigang studied communication sciences and later psychology at Pennsylvania State University from 2016 to 2018. She has been studying sports science at the Goethe University Frankfurt since the 2018/19 winter semester.

In December 2023, Freigang published a book with personal photographs from Germany's World Cup campaign. The limited edition was sold out in ten minutes.

== Career statistics ==
As of 9 October 2026

Appearances and goals by national team and year
| National team | Year | Apps | Goals |
|---|---|---|---|
| Germany | 2020 | 3 | 4 |
| Germany | 2021 | 7 | 5 |
| Germany | 2022 | 7 | 3 |
| Germany | 2023 | 7 | 0 |
| Germany | 2024 | 10 | 2 |
| Germany | 2025 | 9 | 3 |
| Germany | 2026 | 2 | 0 |
| Total | | 45 | 17 |

Scores and results list Germany's goal tally first, score column indicates score after each Freigang goal.

List of international goals scored by Laura Freigang
| No. | Date | Venue | Opponent | Score | Result | Competition |
|---|---|---|---|---|---|---|
| 1 | 22 September 2020 | Podgorica, Montenegro | Montenegro | 1–0 | 3–0 | UEFA Euro 2021 qualifying |
| 2 | 27 November 2020 | Ingolstadt, Germany | Greece | 2–0 | 6–0 | UEFA Euro 2021 qualifying |
| 3 | 27 November 2020 | Ingolstadt, Germany | Greece | 3–0 | 6–0 | UEFA Euro 2021 qualifying |
| 4 | 27 November 2020 | Ingolstadt, Germany | Greece | 4–0 | 6–0 | UEFA Euro 2021 qualifying |
| 5 | 24 February 2021 | Venlo, Netherlands | Netherlands | 1–1 | 1–2 | Friendly |
| 6 | 10 April 2021 | Wiesbaden, Germany | Australia | 4–0 | 5–2 | Friendly |
| 7 | 13 April 2021 | Wiesbaden, Germany | Norway | 1–1 | 3–1 | Friendly |
| 8 | 26 October 2021 | Essen, Germany | Israel | 3–0 | 7–0 | 2023 FIFA World Cup qualification |
| 9 | 26 November 2021 | Braunschweig, Germany | Turkey | 6–0 | 8–0 | 2023 FIFA World Cup qualification |
| 10 | 6 September 2022 | Plovdiv, Bulgaria | Bulgaria | 2–0 | 8–0 | 2023 FIFA World Cup qualification |
| 11 | 6 September 2022 | Plovdiv, Bulgaria | Bulgaria | 6–0 | 8–0 | 2023 FIFA World Cup qualification |
| 12 | 6 September 2022 | Plovdiv, Bulgaria | Bulgaria | 8–0 | 8–0 | 2023 FIFA World Cup qualification |
| 13 | 29 November 2024 | Zurich, Switzerland | Switzerland | 2–0 | 6–0 | Friendly |
| 14 | 29 November 2024 | Zurich, Switzerland | Switzerland | 4–0 | 6–0 | Friendly |
| 15 | 25 February 2025 | Nuremberg, Germany | Austria | 1–1 | 4–1 | 2025 UEFA Nations League |
| 16 | 8 April 2025 | Wolfsburg, Germany | Scotland | 5–1 | 6–1 | 2025 UEFA Nations League |
| 17 | 3 June 2025 | Vienna, Austria | Austria | 2–0 | 6–0 | 2025 UEFA Nations League |

== Honours ==
Germany

- Summer Olympics bronze medal: 2024
- UEFA Women's Championship runner-up: 2022
- UEFA Women's Nations League third place: 2023–24

Individual

- Silbernes Lorbeerblatt: 2024

== See also ==
- List of Pennsylvania State University Olympians
