= 2018–19 DFB-Pokal Frauen =

Tournament details
- Country: Germany
- Venue(s): RheinEnergieStadion, Cologne
- Dates: 11 August 2018 – 1 May 2019
- Teams: 50

Final positions
- Champions: VfL Wolfsburg (6th title)
- Runner-up: SC Freiburg

Tournament statistics
- Matches played: 49
- Goals scored: 242 (4.94 per match)
- Attendance: 36,860 (752 per match)
- Top goal scorer(s): Seven players (5 goals)
- Goals scored in penalty shoot-outs not included.

The 2018–19 DFB-Pokal was the 39th season of the annual German football cup competition. Fifty teams participated in the competition, including all teams from the previous year's Frauen-Bundesliga and the 2. Frauen-Bundesliga, excluding second teams. The competition began on 11 August 2018 with the first of six rounds and ended on 1 May 2019 with the final at the RheinEnergieStadion in Cologne, a nominally neutral venue, which has hosted the final since 2010. The DFB-Pokal is considered the second-most important club title in German women's football after the Bundesliga championship. The DFB-Pokal is run by the German Football Association (DFB).

The defending champions were Frauen-Bundesliga side VfL Wolfsburg, after they defeated Bayern Munich 3–2 on penalties in the previous final.

They successfully defended their title after a 1–0 victory over SC Freiburg.

== Participating clubs ==
The following 50 clubs qualified for the competition:

| Bundesliga the 12 clubs of the 2017–18 season | 2. Bundesliga; 16 of the 24 clubs of the 2017–18 season (Note: The second teams of 1. FFC Frankfurt, SC Freiburg, 1899 Hoffenheim, USV Jena, 1. FC Köln, Bayern Munich, Turbine Potsdam and VfL Wolfsburg are not eligible.) | Regionalliga; 1 of 2 promoted teams of the 2017–18 season (Note: The second team of SGS Essen is not eligible.) |
| Werder Bremen; MSV Duisburg; SGS Essen; 1. FFC Frankfurt; SC Freiburg; 1899 Hoffenheim; USV Jena; 1. FC Köln; Bayern Munich; Turbine Potsdam; SC Sand; VfL Wolfsburg | SG Andernach; Arminia Bielefeld; BV Cloppenburg; Jahn Delmenhorst; FSV Gütersloh; SV Henstedt-Ulzburg; Herforder SV; Bayer Leverkusen; Borussia Mönchengladbach; Blau-Weiß Hohen Neuendorf; Schott Mainz; SV Meppen; 1. FFC Niederkirchen; 1. FC Saarbrücken; VfL Sindelfingen; Hessen Wetzlar | SV Weinberg |
Verbandspokal the 21 winners of the regional association cups
| Baden; Karlsruher SC: Bayern; FC Forstern: Berlin; Viktoria Berlin: Brandenburg; FSV Babelsberg: Bremen; TuS Schwachhausen: Hamburg; Bramfelder SV: Hessen; Jahn Calden | Mecklenburg-Vorpommern; 1. FC Neubrandenburg; Mittelrhein; Vorwärts Spoho Köln: Niederrhein; Borussia Bocholt: Niedersachsen; Hannover 96: Rheinland; SV Holzbach: Saarland; 1. FC Riegelsberg; Sachsen; Fortuna Dresden | Sachsen-Anhalt; Magdeburger FFC: Schleswig-Holstein; Holstein Kiel: Südbaden; Hegauer FV: Südwest; TuS Wörrstadt: Thüringen; 1. FFV Erfurt; Westfalen; DJK-VfL Billerbeck: Württemberg; SV Alberweiler |

== Format ==
Clubs from lower leagues will host against clubs from higher leagues until the quarter-finals. Should both clubs play below the 2. Bundesliga, there will be no host club change anymore.

== Schedule ==
The rounds of the 2018–19 competition are scheduled as follows:

| Round | Matches |
|---|---|
| First round | 11–12 August 2018 |
| Second round | 8–9 September 2018 |
| Round of 16 | 17–18 November 2018 |
| Quarter-finals | 13 March 2019 |
| Semi-finals | 31 March 2019 |
| Final | 1 May 2019 at RheinEnergieStadion, Cologne |

== Matches ==
A total of forty-nine matches took place, starting with the first round on 11 August 2018 and culminating with the final on 1 May 2019 at the RheinEnergieStadion in Cologne.

Times up to 27 October 2018 and from 31 March 2019 are CEST (UTC+2). Times from 28 October 2018 to 30 March 2019 are CET (UTC+1).

=== First round ===
The eighteen matches were drawn on 12 July and took place on 12 August 2018. The twelve clubs from the 2017–18 Bundesliga season and the two clubs promoted from the 2017–18 2. Bundesliga received a bye.

| Team 1 | Score | Team 2 |
|---|---|---|
| Herforder SV | 1–0 | Viktoria Berlin |
| SV Henstedt-Ulzburg | 6–0 | Fortuna Dresden |
| Borussia Bocholt | 0–2 | SV Meppen |
| DJK-VfL Billerbeck | 1–4 | FSV Gütersloh |
| TuS Schwachhausen | 1–3 | BV Cloppenburg |
| 1. FC Neubrandenburg | 1–0 | FSV Babelsberg |
| Holstein Kiel | 0–4 | Jahn Calden |
| Jahn Delmenhorst | 9–0 | Bramfelder SV |
| Hannover 96 | 4–2 | Blau-Weiß Hohen Neuendorf |
| Magdeburger FFC | 2–5 | Arminia Bielefeld |
| SG Andernach | 2–4 (a.e.t.) | 1. FC Saarbrücken |
| VfL Sindelfingen | 2–2 (a.e.t.); 4–5 (p) | SV Alberweiler |
| TuS Wörrstadt | 1–2 | SV Weinberg |
| Schott Mainz | 1–3 | FC Forstern |
| 1. FFC Niederkirchen | 5–1 | SV Holzbach |
| Karlsruher SC | 1–3 | Hegauer FV |
| 1. FC Riegelsberg | 0–6 | Hessen Wetzlar |
| 1. FFV Erfurt | 0–2 | Vorwärts Spoho Köln |

=== Second round ===
The sixteen matches were drawn on 18 August and took place on 8 and 9 September 2018.

| Team 1 | Score | Team 2 |
|---|---|---|
| Hannover 96 | 0–11 | VfL Wolfsburg |
| SV Alberweiler | 0–4 | Bayer Leverkusen |
| Vorwärts Spoho Köln | 0–12 | SC Freiburg |
| SV Henstedt-Ulzburg | 0–14 | SGS Essen |
| Hessen Wetzlar | 0–1 | 1. FFC Frankfurt |
| 1. FFC Niederkirchen | 1–3 | FC Forstern |
| 1. FC Neubrandenburg | 0–13 | MSV Duisburg |
| Hegauer FV | 0–5 | 1. FC Saarbrücken |
| BV Cloppenburg | 3–4 | Borussia Mönchengladbach |
| Jahn Calden | 1–4 | Werder Bremen |
| SV Meppen | 0–6 | Turbine Potsdam |
| Arminia Bielefeld | 1–0 | FSV Gütersloh |
| Jahn Delmenhorst | 1–3 | Herforder SV |
| USV Jena | 0–3 | Bayern Munich |
| SV Weinberg | 1–2 (a.e.t.) | SC Sand |
| 1. FC Köln | 0–5 | 1899 Hoffenheim |

=== Third round ===
The sixteen matches were drawn on 10 September and took place on 17 and 18 November 2018.

| Team 1 | Score | Team 2 |
|---|---|---|
| MSV Duisburg | 1–3 | Turbine Potsdam |
| Bayern Munich | 3–0 | Werder Bremen |
| SC Sand | 1–2 (a.e.t.) | 1899 Hoffenheim |
| 1. FC Saarbrücken | 2–3 | 1. FFC Frankfurt |
| Arminia Bielefeld | 1–2 | Bayer Leverkusen |
| SGS Essen | 0–4 | SC Freiburg |
| FC Forstern | 0–9 | VfL Wolfsburg |
| Herforder SV | 0–3 | Borussia Mönchengladbach |

=== Quarterfinals ===
The draw was made on 10 February 2019. The matches took place on 12 and 13 March 2019.

| Team 1 | Score | Team 2 |
|---|---|---|
| Bayer Leverkusen | 1–7 | 1899 Hoffenheim |
| 1. FFC Frankfurt | 1–3 | Bayern Munich |
| Borussia Mönchengladbach | 1–6 | SC Freiburg |
| VfL Wolfsburg | 4–0 | Turbine Potsdam |

=== Semifinals ===
The draw was made on 14 March 2019. The matches took place on 31 March 2019.

| Team 1 | Score | Team 2 |
|---|---|---|
| 1899 Hoffenheim | 0–2 | SC Freiburg |
| Bayern Munich | 0–4 | VfL Wolfsburg |

=== Final ===
The final took place on 1 May 2019.

1 May 2019
17:15 (UTC+2)

| VfL Wolfsburg | 1–0 | SC Freiburg |
|---|---|---|
| Pajor 55' | Report |

RheinEnergieStadion, Cologne
Attendance: 17,048
Referee: Susann Kunkel

| Wolfsburg | Freiburg |

| GK | 1 | (Germany) Almuth Schult |
| RB | 26 | (Norway) Caroline Graham Hansen |
| CB | 4 | (Sweden) Nilla Fischer (c) |
| CB | 8 | (Germany) Babett Peter |
| LB | 3 | (Hungary) Zsanett Jakabfi | (substituted off) 72' |
| CM | 7 | (Iceland) Sara Björk Gunnarsdóttir |
| CM | 28 | (Germany) Lena Goeßling |
| RW | 9 | (Germany) Anna Blässe |
| AM | 22 | (Denmark) Pernille Harder |
| LW | 17 | (Poland) Ewa Pajor | (substituted off) 90+1' |
| CF | 11 | (Germany) Alexandra Popp |
Substitutes:
| GK | 27 | (England) Mary Earps |
| DF | 16 | (Switzerland) Noelle Maritz |
| DF | 23 | (Germany) Sara Doorsoun |
| MF | 5 | (Portugal) Cláudia Neto |
| MF | 20 | (Germany) Pia-Sophie Wolter | (substituted in) 72' |
| FW | 19 | (Norway) Kristine Minde |
| FW | 30 | (United States) Ella Masar | (substituted in) 90+1' |
Manager:
(Germany) Stephan Lerch

| GK | 32 | (Germany) Lena Nuding |
| RB | 23 | (Netherlands) Desiree van Lunteren |
| CB | 25 | (Austria) Virginia Kirchberger |
| CB | 27 | (Germany) Clara Schöne (c) | (substituted off) 63' |
| LB | 20 | (Germany) Greta Stegemann |
| CM | 24 | (Germany) Anja Hegenauer | (substituted off) 73' |
| CM | 9 | (Germany) Janina Minge |
| RW | 7 | (Germany) Giulia Gwinn |
| AM | 10 | (Israel) Sharon Beck |
| LW | 21 | (Germany) Klara Bühl |
| CF | 13 | (Germany) Sandra Starke |
Substitutes:
| GK | 1 | (Germany) Merle Frohms |
| DF | 2 | (Germany) Lisa Karl |
| MF | 6 | (Japan) Hikaru Naomoto |
| MF | 8 | (Germany) Rebecca Knaak | (substituted in) 63' |
| MF | 15 | (Germany) Marie Müller |
| FW | 18 | (Germany) Stefanie Sanders |
| FW | 22 | (Germany) Lena Lotzen | (substituted in) 73' |
Manager:
(Germany) Jens Scheuer

Assistant referees:
Marina Wozniak
Sylvia Peters
Fourth official:
Mirka Derlin

Match rules

- 90 minutes.
- 30 minutes of extra time if necessary.
- Penalty shoot-out if scores still level.
- Seven named substitutes.
- Maximum of three substitutions, with a fourth allowed in extra time.
