= 2019–20 Frauen-Bundesliga =

Frauen-Bundesliga
- Season: 2019–20
- Dates: 17 August 2019 – 28 June 2020
- Champions: VfL Wolfsburg
- Relegated: 1. FC Köln; USV Jena
- Champions League: Wolfsburg; Bayern Munich
- Matches: 132
- Goals: 502 (3.8 per match)
- Top goalscorer: Pernille Harder (27 goals)
- Biggest home win: Hoffenheim 7–0 Essen; Wolfsburg 8–1 Jena
- Biggest away win: Freiburg 0–8 Wolfsburg
- Highest scoring: Wolfsburg 8–1 Jena; Potsdam 4–5 Freiburg
- Attendance: 85,748 (650 per match) (Note: The average league attendance was 912 after 94 matches prior to fixtures being played behind closed doors.)

The 2019–20 season of the Frauen-Bundesliga was the 30th season of Germany's premier women's football league. It ran from 17 August 2019 to 28 June 2020.

VfL Wolfsburg won their fourth straight and sixth overall title.

== Effects of the COVID-19 pandemic ==
Due to the COVID-19 pandemic in Germany, on 8 March 2020 the Federal Minister of Health, Jens Spahn recommended cancelling events with more than 1,000 people. On 13 March, the DFB announced that a match scheduled for 15 March, was postponed. On 16 March, it was announced that the league will be suspended until 19 April. After a meeting on 31 March, the suspension was extended until 30 April. A decision on the resumption of the competition, similar to the Bundesliga and 2. Bundesliga, was taken at an extraordinary meeting of the DFB-Bundestag on 25 May 2020. On 20 May, it was announced that the league will be continued on 29 May. That was confirmed on 25 May. All matches were played behind closed doors. In addition, five substitutions were permitted for the remaining matches, following a proposal from FIFA and approval by IFAB to lessen the impact of fixture congestion.

== Teams ==
Locations of teams in the 2019–20 Frauen-Bundesliga

=== Team changes ===
Promoted from 2018–19 2. Bundesliga	Relegated from 2018–19 Bundesliga
1. FC Köln; USV Jena	Werder Bremen; Borussia Mönchengladbach

=== Stadiums ===
Team	Home city	Home ground	Capacity
MSV Duisburg	Duisburg	PCC-Stadion	3,000
SGS Essen	Essen	Stadion Essen	20,000
1. FFC Frankfurt	Frankfurt	Stadion am Brentanobad	5,500
SC Freiburg	Freiburg	Möslestadion	18,000
1899 Hoffenheim	Hoffenheim	Dietmar-Hopp-Stadion	6,350
USV Jena	Jena	Ernst-Abbe-Sportfeld	10,800
1. FC Köln	Cologne	Südstadion	11,748
Bayer 04 Leverkusen	Leverkusen	Jugendleistungszentrum Kurtekotten	1,140
Bayern Munich	Munich	Grünwalder Stadion	12,500
Turbine Potsdam	Potsdam	Karl-Liebknecht-Stadion	10,786
SC Sand	Willstätt	Kühnmatt Stadion	2,000
VfL Wolfsburg	Wolfsburg	AOK Stadium	5,200

== League table ==
Pos	Team	Pld	W	D	L	GF	GA	GD	Pts	Qualification or relegation
1	VfL Wolfsburg (C)	22	20	2	0	93	8	+85	62	Qualification for Champions League
2	Bayern Munich	22	17	3	2	60	14	+46	54	Qualification for Champions League
3	1899 Hoffenheim	22	16	1	5	67	24	+43	49	
4	Turbine Potsdam	22	12	1	9	52	45	+7	37	
5	SGS Essen	22	11	2	9	41	39	+2	35	
6	1. FFC Frankfurt	22	10	3	9	44	47	−3	33	
7	SC Freiburg	22	9	4	9	43	47	−4	31	
8	SC Sand	22	8	1	13	24	43	−19	25	
9	MSV Duisburg	22	4	5	13	19	47	−28	17	
10	Bayer Leverkusen	22	5	2	15	22	51	−29	17	
11	1. FC Köln (R)	22	5	2	15	22	60	−38	17	Relegation to 2. Bundesliga
12	USV Jena (R)	22	0	4	18	15	77	−62	4	Relegation to 2. Bundesliga

Source: DFB
Rules for classification: 1) Points; 2) Goal difference; 3) Goals scored; 4) Head-to-head points; 5) Head-to-head goal difference; 6) Head-to-head goals scored; 7) Head-to-head away goals scored; 8) Away goals scored; 9) Play-off.
(C) Champions; (R) Relegated

== Results ==
Home \ Away	DUI	ESS	FRA	FRE	HOF	JEN	KÖL	LEV	MUN	POT	SAN	WOL
MSV Duisburg	—	0–4	1–2	0–1	0–4	0–0	1–1	2–1	2–2	0–0	0–2	1–6
SGS Essen	2–1	—	2–1	5–0	3–2	1–1	3–1	3–1	0–3	2–0	5–2	0–3
1. FFC Frankfurt	5–1	1–1	—	0–2	2–2	4–2	1–0	3–1	2–3	3–2	3–1	0–3
SC Freiburg	2–2	1–2	3–3	—	1–5	4–0	6–1	1–1	1–3	3–2	0–0	0–8
1899 Hoffenheim	3–0	7–0	4–0	4–1	—	2–0	4–0	4–1	1–0	5–1	1–0	2–5
USV Jena	0–2	1–7	2–3	0–6	1–6	—	2–2	0–0	0–3	1–6	0–2	0–6
1. FC Köln	2–1	1–0	1–4	2–4	0–1	1–0	—	4–3	0–4	1–2	1–0	0–5
Bayer Leverkusen	0–2	2–0	1–3	1–0	1–3	2–0	3–1	—	0–3	1–5	1–2	0–7
Bayern Munich	4–0	2–0	3–0	2–0	3–0	2–0	5–2	1–2	—	3–1	3–1	0–0
Turbine Potsdam	2–1	1–0	4–3	4–5	2–1	6–2	5–0	1–0	1–5	—	2–1	0–3
SC Sand	0–2	3–0	3–0	0–2	0–6	4–2	2–1	1–0	0–5	0–4	—	0–4
VfL Wolfsburg	4–0	5–1	5–1	2–0	3–0	8–1	4–0	5–0	1–1	5–1	1–0	—

Source: DFB
Legend: Blue = home team win; Yellow = draw; Red = away team win.

== Top scorers ==
Rank	Player	Club	Goals
1	(Denmark) Pernille Harder	VfL Wolfsburg	27
2	(Austria) Nicole Billa	1899 Hoffenheim	18
3	(Germany) Laura Freigang	1. FFC Frankfurt	16
3	(Poland) Ewa Pajor	VfL Wolfsburg	16
3	(Germany) Lea Schüller	SGS Essen	16
6	(Slovenia) Lara Prašnikar	Turbine Potsdam	15
7	(Germany) Isabella Hartig	1899 Hoffenheim	12
7	(Germany) Tabea Waßmuth	1899 Hoffenheim	12
9	(Germany) Klara Bühl	SC Freiburg	11
9	(Serbia) Jovana Damnjanović	Bayern Munich	11
9	(Germany) Alexandra Popp	VfL Wolfsburg	11
