= 2024–25 DFB-Pokal Frauen =

Tournament details
- Country: Germany
- Venue(s): RheinEnergieStadion, Cologne
- Dates: 17 August 2024 – 1 May 2025
- Teams: 50

Final positions
- Champions: Bayern Munich (2nd title)
- Runners-up: Werder Bremen

Tournament statistics
- Matches played: 49
- Goals scored: 203 (4.14 per match)
- Attendance: 181,554 (3,705 per match)
- Top goal scorer(s): Nina Lange; Lea Schüller (5 goals)
- Goals scored in penalty shoot-outs not included.

The 2024–25 DFB-Pokal was the 43rd season of the annual German football cup competition. Fifty teams participated in the competition, including all teams from the previous year's Frauen-Bundesliga and the 2. Frauen-Bundesliga, excluding second teams. The competition began on 17 August 2024 with the first of six rounds and ended on 1 May 2025 with the final at the RheinEnergieStadion in Cologne, a nominally neutral venue, which has hosted the final since 2010.

VfL Wolfsburg were the ten-time defending champions. Bayern Munich won the tournament with a 4–2 win over Werder Bremen.

== Participating clubs ==
The following clubs qualified for the competition:

Bundesliga the 12 clubs of the 2023–24 season	2. Bundesliga; 10 of the 14 clubs of the 2023–24 season (Note: Second teams are not eligible.)	Regionalliga the 2 promoted teams and the 5 champions of the 2023–24 season
Werder Bremen; MSV Duisburg; SGS Essen; Eintracht Frankfurt; SC Freiburg; TSG Hoffenheim; 1. FC Köln; Bayer Leverkusen; RB Leipzig; 1. FC Nürnberg; Bayern Munich; VfL Wolfsburg	SG Andernach; FSV Gütersloh; Hamburger SV; FC Ingolstadt; Carl Zeiss Jena; SV Meppen; Borussia Mönchengladbach; Turbine Potsdam; SC Sand; SV 67 Weinberg	Union Berlin; Arminia Bielefeld; VfL Bochum; SV Hegnach (Note: SV Hegnach qualified as runners-up of the Regionalliga Süd as champions SC Freiburg II were ineligible.); Hertha BSC; SV Henstedt-Ulzburg; Mainz 05
Verbandspokal the 21 winners of the regional association cups
Baden: Karlsruher SC; Bavaria: FC Forstern (Note: FC Forstern qualified regardless of the outcome of the final of the Bavaria Cup, as 1. FC Nürnberg II, the other finalists, were ineligible.); Berlin: Viktoria Berlin (Note: Viktoria Berlin qualified regardless of the outcome of the final of the Berlin Cup, as Union Berlin, the other finalists, already qualified through their Regionalliga Nordost position.); Brandenburg: BSG Stahl Brandenburg; Bremen: ATS Buntentor; Hamburg: FC St. Pauli; Hesse: Kickers Offenbach	Lower Rhine: VfR Warbeyen; Lower Saxony: Rot-Weiss Göttingen; Mecklenburg-Vorpommern: Hansa Rostock; Middle Rhine: Fortuna Köln; Rhineland: TuS Issel; Saarland: SV Elversberg; Saxony: Eintracht Leipzig-Süd (Note: Eintracht Leipzig-Süd qualified regardless of the outcome of the Saxony Cup final, as RB Leipzig II, the other finalists, were ineligible.)	Saxony-Anhalt: 1. FC Magdeburg; Schleswig-Holstein: Kieler MTV; South Baden: Hegauer FV; Southwest: SC Siegelbach (Note: SC Siegelbach qualified regardless of the outcome of the final of the Southwest Cup, as Mainz 05, the other finalists, already qualified through their Regionalliga Südwest position.); Thuringia: 1. FFV Erfurt (Note: 1. FFV Erfurt qualified regardless of the outcome of the Thuringian Cup final, as Carl Zeiss Jena II, the other finalists, were ineligible.); Westphalia: Wacker Mecklenbeck; Württemberg: VfB Stuttgart

== Format ==
All clubs from the 2023–24 Frauen-Bundesliga and the four best-placed teams from the 2023–24 2. Frauen-Bundesliga received a bye in the first round. Clubs from lower leagues hosted against clubs from higher leagues until the quarter-finals.

== Schedule ==
The rounds of the 2024–25 competition were scheduled as follows:

Round	Matches
First round	17–20 August 2024
Second round	6–11 September 2024
Round of 16	22–24 November 2024
Quarter-finals	11–13 February 2025
Semi-finals	22–23 March 2025
Final	1 May 2025 at RheinEnergieStadion, Cologne

== Matches ==
Times up to 27 October 2024 and from 30 March 2025 are CEST (UTC+2). Times from 28 October 2024 to 29 March 2025 are CET (UTC+1).

=== First round ===
The draw took place on 27 June 2024, with Ulrike Ballweg drawing the matches. The teams are split into a North and a South group. The Bundesliga and the two best-placed teams from the 2. Bundesliga had a bye. The matches will take place between 17 and 20 August 2024.

17 August 2024	Hertha BSC	5–0	ATS Buntentor	Berlin
14:00	Wellhausen 7', 68'; Haesler 9'; Yavuz 86'; Pausch 90'	Report		Stadium: Stadion auf dem Wurfplatz; Attendance: 622; Referee: Miriam Schwermer

17 August 2024	Karlsruher SC	5–0	SV Elversberg	Bruchsal
15:00	Züfle 44'; Deckenbach 53'; Zweigner-Genzer 73'; Rothenberger 82'; Dillmann 88'	Report		Stadium: Rasenplatz 1. FC Bruchsal; Attendance: 170; Referee: Sina Gieringer

17 August 2024	Fortuna Köln	3–1	TuS Issel	Cologne
16:30	Schwing 28', 37'; Fohrer 90+4'	Report	Blesius 11'	Stadium: Merian Stadion; Attendance: 298; Referee: Nadine Westerhoff

17 August 2024	VfR Warbeyen	1–1 (a.e.t.) (3–4 p)	Wacker Mecklenbeck	Kleve
18:00	Dallmann 90+8'	Report	Haack 71'	Stadium: Eroglu-Arena; Attendance: 710; Referee: Anna-Lena Weiss
	Penalties
	Van Waisem (penalty scored); Dallmann (penalty scored); Opladen (penalty scored)		(penalty scored) Große-Scharmann; (penalty scored) Iliadi; (penalty scored) Haack; (penalty scored) Kesse

18 August 2024	Hansa Rostock	0–10	VfL Bochum	Rostock
11:00		Report	Lange 21', 63', 67', 79'; Angerer 24', 55'; Karwatzki 26'; Huber 33'; Marques 77', 87' (pen.)	Stadium: Volksstadion; Attendance: 300; Referee: Celina-Sophie Böhm

18 August 2024	SC Siegelbach	2–5	1. FFV Erfurt	Kaiserslautern
13:30	Zimmermann 78'; Frank 81'	Report	Mittelsdorf 32', 52'; N. Gast 68'; J. Gast 71', 86'	Stadium: Sportanlage Siegelbach; Attendance: 344; Referee: Paula Mayer

18 August 2024	FC St. Pauli	0–2	Arminia Bielefeld	Hamburg
14:00		Report	Reinkensmeier 37'; Leuchtmann 83'	Stadium: Adolf-Jäger-Kampfbahn; Attendance: 1,395; Referee: Lara Wolf

18 August 2024	Kickers Offenbach	3–2	FC Ingolstadt	Offenbach
14:00	Klich 10' (pen.); Zekaj 28'; Riepl 90'	Report	Bogenschütz 30'; Burkard 45+3'	Stadium: SANA Sportpark; Attendance: 160; Referee: Julia Boike

18 August 2024	Eintracht Leipzig-Süd	0–5	Borussia Mönchengladbach	Leipzig
14:00		Report	Aslanaj 13' (pen.), 39' (pen.); Corres 36', 45'; van der Drift 46'	Stadium: Südkampfbahn; Attendance: 275; Referee: Franziska Wildfeuer

18 August 2024	FC Forstern	0–4	SV 67 Weinberg	Forstern
14:00		Report	Ganßer 9'; Kömm 22', 82'; Schlitter 55'	Stadium: Sportanlage Forstern; Attendance: 130; Referee: Lena Krämling

18 August 2024	Hegauer FV	0–4	SV Hegnach	Engen
14:00		Report	Mijatovic 9'; Gajewski 49'; Nellessen 67'; Meyer 87'	Stadium: Stadion Welschingen; Attendance: 130; Referee: Theresa Hug

18 August 2024	VfB Stuttgart	1–2	Mainz 05	Stuttgart
14:00	Islacker 67'	Report	Stendebach 27'; Anstatt 62'	Stadium: Robert-Schlienz-Stadion; Attendance: 781; Referee: Daniela Kottmann

18 August 2024	Rot-Weiss Göttingen	1–7	SV Meppen	Göttingen
15:00	Bindewald 60'	Report	Nagy 11'; Fiekers 22' (o.g.); Seyen 32'; Mauly 48'; Lux 66'; Miyoshi 80'; Preuss 84'	Stadium: Sportplatz Rot-Weiß Göttingen; Attendance: 827; Referee: Levke Scholz

18 August 2024	SV Henstedt-Ulzburg	1–4	Viktoria Berlin	Henstedt-Ulzburg
15:00	Hille 69'	Report	Ehegötz 74'; Urbanek 76'; Homp 78' (o.g.); Künzel 81'	Stadium: Beckersbergstadion; Attendance: 125; Referee: Anna-Lena Heidenreich

18 August 2024	1. FC Magdeburg	0–2	Hamburger SV	Magdeburg
15:00		Report	Burmann 23'; Büchele 70'	Stadium: Heinrich Germer Stadium; Attendance: 1,550; Referee: Monique Panetta

18 August 2024	SG Andernach	1–2	SC Sand	Andernach
15:00	Wagner 53'	Report	Takizawa 16'; Griß 34'	Stadium: Stadion am Bassenheimer Weg; Attendance: 220; Referee: Naemi Breier

18 August 2024	BSG Stahl Brandenburg	1–5	Kieler MTV	Brandenburg an der Havel
16:00	Lemme 82'	Report	Ballay 2', 36', 67'; Uck 65'; Östermann 76'	Stadium: Stadion am Quenz; Attendance: 200; Referee: Katharina Linke

20 August 2024	FSV Gütersloh	2–2 (2–4 p)	Union Berlin	Gütersloh
18:30	Schröder 45'; Stojan 89'	Report	Moraitou 56'; Markou 84'	Stadium: Heidewaldstadion; Attendance: 730; Referee: Katrin Rafalski
	Penalties
	Stojan (penalty missed); Schuster (penalty scored); Preuß (penalty scored); Tappe (penalty missed)		Heiseler (penalty scored); D. Orschmann (penalty scored); Markou (penalty scored); K. Orschmann (penalty scored)

=== Second round ===
The draw took place on 20 August 2024, with Verena Schweers drawing the matches. The matches will take place between 6 and 11 September 2024.

6 September 2024	Hertha BSC	0–6	VfL Wolfsburg	Berlin
18:30		Report	Hagel 21'; Wilms 27', 87'; Kalma 39'; Endemann 49'; Arias 63'	Stadium: Stadion auf dem Wurfplatz; Attendance: 3,068; Referee: Miriam Schwermer

7 September 2024	MSV Duisburg	0–9	Hamburger SV	Duisburg
13:00		Report	Kardesler 19'; Woelki 22', 52'; Marquardt 36'; Büchele 41' (pen.); Meyer 86', 88'; Sierra 88'	Stadium: Sportplatz Mündelheimer Straße; Attendance: 300; Referee: Julia Boike

7 September 2024	SV Meppen	1–1 (a.e.t.) (2–3 p)	Carl Zeiss Jena	Meppen
14:00	Lux 48'	Report	Reuter 64'	Stadium: Hänsch-Arena; Attendance: 446; Referee: Sarah Willms
	Penalties
	Lux (penalty missed); Rolfes (penalty scored); Seyen (penalty scored); Kossen (penalty missed); Preuss (penalty missed)		(penalty scored) Ihlenburg; (penalty scored) Mesch; (penalty scored) Woldmann

7 September 2024	Kieler MTV	0–4	VfL Bochum	Kiel
14:00		Report	Angerer 9', 63'; Marques 30'; Lange 48'	Stadium: Hauptplatz Schilksee; Attendance: 500; Referee: Jacqueline Herrmann

7 September 2024	1. FC Nürnberg	1–2	SC Freiburg	Nuremberg
14:00	Guttenberger 43'	Report	Steuerwald 6'; Stegemann 20'	Stadium: Max-Morlock-Platz; Attendance: 385; Referee: Davina Lutz

7 September 2024	Mainz 05	3–0	Kickers Offenbach	Mainz
17:00	Pageler 68', 79'; Kats 86'	Report		Stadium: Bruchwegstadion auf dem Wolfgang Frank Campus; Attendance: 750; Referee: Paula Mayer

8 September 2024	Karlsruher SC	0–2	Bayer Leverkusen	Karlsruhe
12:00		Report	Kögel 25'; Beck 73' (o.g.)	Stadium: GRENKE-Jugendstadion Platz 2 Attendance: 500; Referee: Alessia Jochum

8 September 2024	Fortuna Köln	3–1	SV 67 Weinberg	Cologne
13:00	Streller 32', 48'; Schwing 90'	Report	Schneider 7'	Stadium: BZA Chorweiler; Attendance: 100; Referee: Anna-Lena Weiss

8 September 2024	SC Sand	0–6	Bayern Munich	Willstätt
14:00		Report	Damnjanović 6'; Stanway 25'; Dallmann 58'; Gwinn 69'; Olme 72'; Schüller 89'	Stadium: Adams Arena; Attendance: 2,378; Referee: Selina Menzel

8 September 2024	Borussia Mönchengladbach	1–1 (a.e.t.) (8–7 p)	1. FC Köln	Mönchengladbach
14:00	Aslanaj 48'	Report	Leimenstoll 85'	Stadium: Grenzlandstadion; Attendance: 878; Referee: Nadine Westerhoff
	Penalties
	Bartsch (penalty scored); Van Leeuwe (penalty scored); Klensmann (penalty missed); Guyens (penalty scored); Arici (penalty scored); Zielinski (penalty scored); Van der Drift (penalty scored); Drissen (penalty scored); Brietzke (penalty scored)		(penalty scored) Feiersinger; (penalty scored) Hechler; (penalty scored) Achcińska; (penalty missed) Bienz; (penalty scored) Billa; (penalty scored) Agrež; (penalty scored) Leimenstoll; (penalty scored) Gerhardt; (penalty missed) Degen

8 September 2024	Arminia Bielefeld	0–4	Werder Bremen	Bielefeld
15:00		Report	Mühlhaus 30', 45+1'; Pápai 89'; Wichmann 90+1'	Stadium: Bielefelder Alm; Attendance: 1,811; Referee: Anke Hölscher

8 September 2024	Viktoria Berlin	0–2	Turbine Potsdam	Berlin
15:00		Report	Kuznetsov 3'; Schmid 61'	Stadium: Stadion Lichterfelde; Attendance: 1,250; Referee: Celina-Sophie Böhm

8 September 2024	SV Hegnach	0–7	TSG Hoffenheim	Waiblingen
15:00		Report	Dongus 44', 61'; Delacauw 45'; Rankin 50'; Harsch 67', 71'; Grabowska 79'	Stadium: Sportplatz Hegnach; Attendance: 270; Referee: Theresa Hug

8 September 2024	Wacker Mecklenbeck	0–3	SGS Essen	Münster
15:30		Report	Maier 18', 76'; Sterner 57'	Stadium: Sportanlage Mecklenbeck; Attendance: 1,200; Referee: Christina Junkers

8 September 2024	Union Berlin	1–0	RB Leipzig	Berlin
16:00	Orschmann 40'	Report		Stadium: An der Alten Försterei; Attendance: 4,186; Referee: Riem Hussein

11 September 2024	1. FFV Erfurt	0–10	Eintracht Frankfurt	Erfurt
18:30		Report	Chiba 8'; Freigang 21', 55', 56'; Reuteler 27', 89'; Gräwe 49'; Anyomi 59'; Dunst 85'; Wamser 88'	Stadium: Steigerwaldstadion; Attendance: 1,753; Referee: Franziska Wildfeuer

=== Round of 16 ===
The draw took place on 16 September 2024, with Lena Lotzen drawing the matches. The matches took place between 22 and 24 November 2024.

22 November 2024	Bayer Leverkusen	1–0	Turbine Potsdam	Leverkusen
18:00	Zdebel 74'	Report		Stadium: Ulrich-Haberland-Stadion; Attendance: 838; Referee: Nadine Westerhoff

22 November 2024	Union Berlin	0–2	Eintracht Frankfurt	Berlin
18:30		Report	Pawollek 83'; Dunst 90+1'	Stadium: Stadion An der Alten Försterei; Attendance: 8,021; Referee: Anna-Lena Heidenreich

22 November 2024	VfL Bochum	0–5	TSG Hoffenheim	Bochum
18:30		Report	Delacauw 29'; Cerci 43', 62'; Cazalla 82'; Memeti 85'	Stadium: Ruhrstadion; Attendance: 5,138; Referee: Sina Diekmann

23 November 2024	Borussia Mönchengladbach	2–0	SGS Essen	Mönchengladbach
14:00	Van Leeuwe 72'; Corres 90+4'	Report		Stadium: Grenzlandstadion; Attendance: 837; Referee: Lara Wolf

23 November 2024	Fortuna Köln	0–3	Werder Bremen	Cologne
16:00		Report	Sternad 45', 53'; Arfaoui 79'	Stadium: Südstadion; Attendance: 1,150; Referee: Julia Bolke

23 November 2024	Mainz 05	1–4	VfL Wolfsburg	Mainz
17:00	Bathmann 30'	Report	Beerensteyn 82'; Jónsdóttir 85', 90+3'; Kalma 89'	Stadium: Bruchwegstadion auf dem Wolfgang Frank Campus; Attendance: 2,500; Referee: Naemi Breier

24 November 2024	Hamburger SV	4–2	Carl Zeiss Jena	Hamburg
12:00	Machtens 25'; Lahr 51'; Marquardt 60'; Meyer 88'	Report	Woelki 32' (o.g.); Gentile 66'	Stadium: Trainingsplatz am Volksparkstadion; Attendance: 523; Referee: Levke Scholz

24 November 2024	SC Freiburg	1–2	Bayern Munich	Freiburg
16:00	Zicai 62'	Report	Felde 27' (o.g.); Schüller 55'	Stadium: Dreisamstadion; Attendance: 7,755; Referee: Davina Lutz

=== Quarterfinals ===
The draw was held on 15 December 2024, with Julian Köster drawing the matches. The matches will take place between 11 and 13 February 2025.

12 February 2025	TSG Hoffenheim	1–0	VfL Wolfsburg	Hoffenheim
18:30	Memeti 52'	Report		Stadium: Dietmar-Hopp-Stadion; Attendance: 1,200; Referee: Karoline Wacker

12 February 2025	Hamburger SV	2–0	Borussia Mönchengladbach	Hamburg
18:30	Hirche 45+1'; Kardesler 69'	Report		Stadium: Volksparkstadion; Attendance: 16,529; Referee: Miriam Schwermer

12 February 2025	Bayer Leverkusen	0–1	Werder Bremen	Leverkusen
18:30		Report	Mühlhaus 45'	Stadium: Ulrich-Haberland-Stadion; Attendance: 1,175; Referee: Davina Lutz

12 February 2025	Bayern Munich	4–1 (a.e.t.)	Eintracht Frankfurt	Munich
18:30	Damnjanović 90', 109'; Viggósdóttir 93'; Tanikawa 104'	Report	Simon 80' (o.g.)	Stadium: FC Bayern Campus; Attendance: 2,500; Referee: Franziska Wildfeuer

=== Semifinals ===
The draw was held on 17 February 2025, with Turid Knaak drewing the matches. The matches will take place on 22 and 23 March 2025.

22 March 2025	Bayern Munich	3–2	TSG Hoffenheim	Munich
14:00	Harder 35', 40' (pen.), 64'	Report	Memeti 14'; Delacauw 24'	Stadium: FC Bayern Campus; Attendance: 2,500; Referee: Miriam Schwermer

23 March 2025	Hamburger SV	1–3 (a.e.t.)	Werder Bremen	Hamburg
15:30	Stöckmann 89'	Report	Weidauer 81', 117'; Wieder 120+1'	Stadium: Volksparkstadion; Attendance: 57,000; Referee: Riem Hussein

=== Final ===
The final took place on 1 May 2025.

1 May 2025
16:00

Bayern Munich	4–2	Werder Bremen
Schüller 6', 65', 79'; Simon 30'	Report	Dieckmann 45+2'; Mühlhaus 90+3'

RheinEnergieStadion, Cologne
Attendance: 45,146
Referee: Annika Kost

Bayern Munich	Werder Bremen

GK	32	(Germany) Ena Mahmutovic
RB	7	(Germany) Giulia Gwinn
CB	4	(Iceland) Glódís Perla Viggósdóttir (c)	(yellow card) 51'
CB	5	(Sweden) Magdalena Eriksson		(substituted off) 86'
LB	30	(Germany) Carolin Simon	(yellow card) 37'	(substituted off) 56'
CM	12	(Germany) Sydney Lohmann		(substituted off) 76'
CM	25	(Austria) Sarah Zadrazil
RW	9	(Serbia) Jovana Damnjanović	(yellow card) 71'	(substituted off) 76'
AM	21	(Denmark) Pernille Harder		(substituted off) 86'
LW	17	(Germany) Klara Bühl
CF	11	(Germany) Lea Schüller
Substitutes:
GK	1	(Germany) Maria Luisa Grohs
DF	2	(Sweden) Linda Sembrant
DF	6	(Norway) Tuva Hansen		(substituted on) 56'
DF	28	(Germany) Michelle Ulbrich		(substituted on) 86'
MF	10	(Germany) Linda Dallmann		(substituted on) 76'
MF	14	(Germany) Alara Şehitler
MF	16	(Sweden) Julia Zigiotti Olme		(substituted on) 76'
MF	27	(Italy) Arianna Caruso		(substituted on) 86'
FW	20	(Germany) Franziska Kett
Manager:
(Norway) Alexander Straus

GK	1	(Switzerland) Livia Peng
RB	33	(Germany) Maria Penner		(substituted off) 35'
CB	18	(Germany) Lina Hausicke (c)
CB	23	(Hungary) Hanna Németh
LB	4	(United States) Kaylie Ronan
CM	13	(Germany) Ricarda Walkling		(substituted off) 46'
CM	22	(Germany) Rieke Dieckmann		(substituted off) 83'
RW	10	(Germany) Tuana Mahmoud
AM	9	(Germany) Sophie Weidauer		(substituted off) 83'
LW	6	(Germany) Reena Wichmann		(substituted off) 68'
CF	7	(Germany) Larissa Mühlhaus	(yellow card) 61'
Substitutes:
GK	26	(Latvia) Sofija Ņesterova
DF	24	(Germany) Lara Schmidt		(substituted on) 35'
MF	8	(Switzerland) Amira Arfaoui
MF	27	(Israel) Sharon Beck
MF	28	(Germany) Juliane Wirtz		(substituted on) 83'
MF	31	(Germany) Verena Wieder		(substituted on) 68'
MF	37	(Germany) Lena Dahms
FW	11	(Slovenia) Maja Sternad		(substituted on) 46'
FW	16	(Hungary) Emőke Pápai		(substituted on) 83'
Manager:
(Germany) Thomas Horsch

Assistant referees:
Jasmin Matysiak
Jessica Bergmann
Fourth official:
Anna-Lena Heidenreich
Video assistant referee:
Katrin Rafalski
Assistant video assistant referee:
Riem Hussein

Match rules

- 90 minutes
- 30 minutes of extra time if necessary
- Penalty shoot-out if scores still level
- Maximum of nine named substitutes
- Maximum of five substitutions
- Maximum of three substitution opportunities

== Top goalscorers ==
Goals scored in penalty shoot-outs are not included.

Rank	Player	Team	Goals
1	(Germany) Nina Lange	VfL Bochum	5
1	(Germany) Lea Schüller	Bayern Munich	5
3	(Germany) Alina Angerer	VfL Bochum	4
3	(Germany) Larissa Mühlhaus	Werder Bremen	4
5	(Kosovo) Flaka Aslanaj	Borussia Mönchengladbach	3
5	(Germany) Emma Ballay	Kieler MTV	3
5	(Germany) Carolin Corres	Borussia Mönchengladbach	3
5	(Serbia) Jovana Damnjanović	Bayern Munich	3
5	(Belgium) Féli Delacauw	TSG Hoffenheim	3
5	(Germany) Laura Freigang	Eintracht Frankfurt	3
5	(Denmark) Pernille Harder	Bayern Munich	3
5	(Portugal) Anna Marques	VfL Bochum	3
5	(Kosovo) Erëleta Memeti	TSG Hoffenheim	3
5	(Germany) Christin Meyer	Hamburger SV	3
5	(Germany) Vivien Schwing	Fortuna Köln	3
