= Leonie Maier =

German footballer (born 1992)

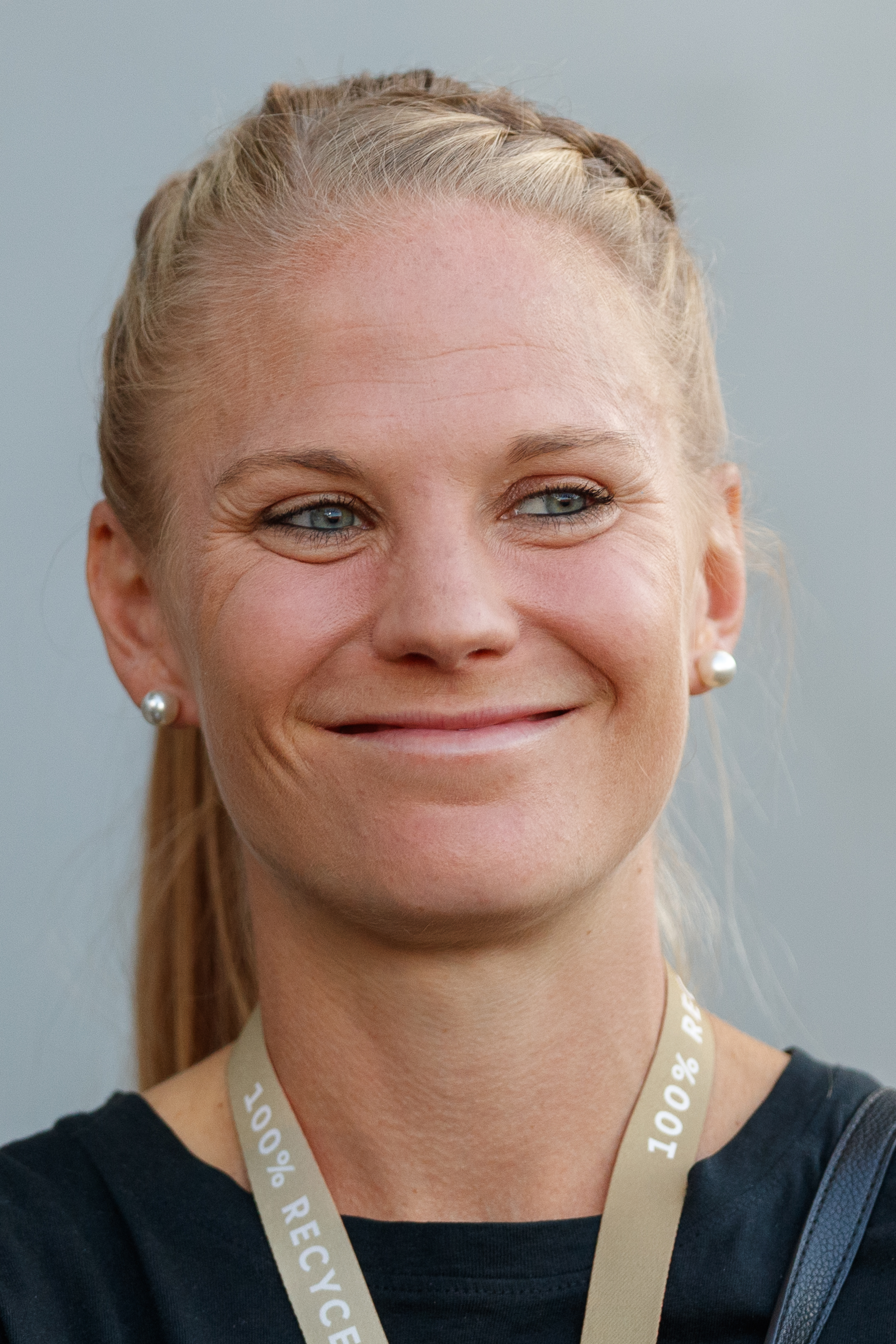
- Maier in 2023

Personal information
- Full name: Leonie Rebekka Maier
- Date of birth: 29 September 1992 (age 34)
- Place of birth: Stuttgart, Germany
- Height: 1.63 m (5 ft 4 in)
- Position: Right-back

Youth career
- TV Aldingen
- –2009: JSG Remseck

Senior career*
Years	Team	Apps	(Gls)
2009–2010	VfL Sindelfingen	31	(9)
2010–2013	SC 07 Bad Neuenahr	65	(7)
2013–2019	Bayern Munich	92	(4)
2019–2021	Arsenal	25	(0)
2021–2023	Everton	24	(2)
2023–2024	TSG Hoffenheim	6	(0)
2024–2025	VfB Stuttgart	15	(5)

International career
2008–2009	Germany U17	15	(3)
2010–2011	Germany U19	18	(1)
2012	Germany U20	12	(3)
2013–2023	Germany	79	(11)
Medal record
Olympic Games
Gold medal – first place	2016 Rio de Janeiro	Team
UEFA Women's Championship
Gold medal – first place	2013 Sweden
- * Club domestic league appearances and goals as of 18 May 2025 (UTC)

Leonie Rebekka Maier (German pronunciation: [ˈleːoni ˈmaɪɐ, leoˈniː -]; born 29 September 1992) is a German former footballer who played as a defender. She previously played for the Germany national team.

== Club career ==
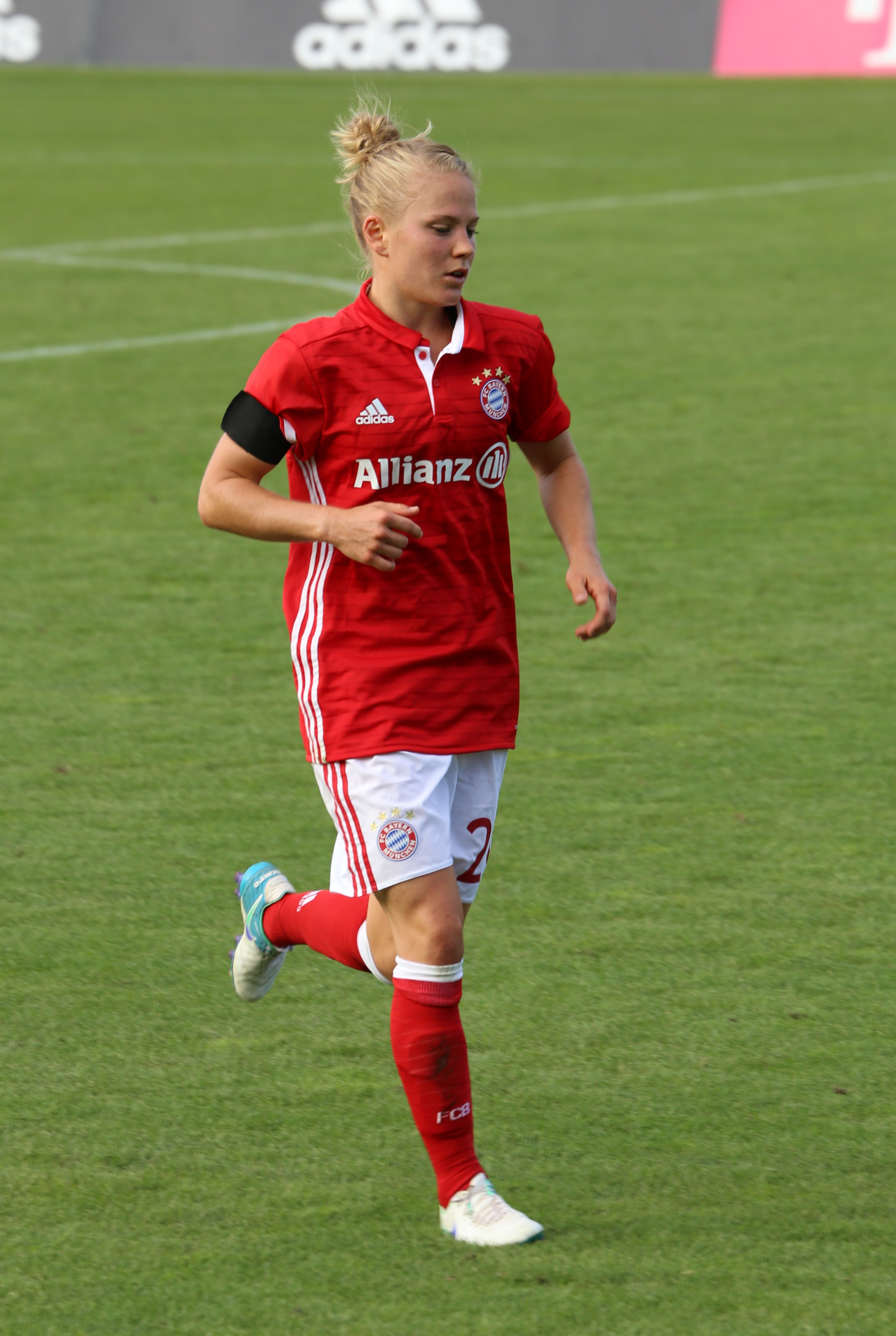
Maier with Bayern Munich in 2016

=== VfL Sindelfingen, 2008–2010 ===
Maier started her professional career with VfL Sindelfingen in the second tier of the Frauen-Bundesliga. She spent two seasons at Sindelfingen. During her second season with Sindelfingen she scored 9 goals in 31 appearances with the club.

=== SC 07 Bad Neuenahr, 2010–2013 ===
Maier then moved to SC 07 Bad Neuenahr, who played in the top tier of the Frauen-Bundesliga. She stayed with the club for three seasons, playing 65 regular season games and scoring two goals. Following the death of the club president, SC 07 Bad Neueahr filed for insolvency, forcing Maier to move.

=== Bayern Munich, 2013–2019 ===
Maier signed for FC Bayern Munich. Since joining the club she has won the Frauen-Bundesliga twice, in 2014–15 and 2015–16. As of the end of the 2018–19 season she has appeared in 92 first team regular season appearances, scoring four times.

=== Arsenal, 2019–2021 ===
Maier signed for Arsenal FC on 31 May 2019. She made 25 appearances across two seasons.

=== Everton, 2021–2023 ===
Maier signed for Everton in July 2021, with a two-year contract until the end of June 2023.

She scored her first goal for Everton on her debut in a 3–1 win vs. Birmingham City.

=== TSG Hoffenheim, 2023–2024 ===
Maier returned to Germany in the summer of 2023 and joined TSG Hoffenheim. In April 2024, she announced her retirement after the 2023–24 season.

=== VfB Stuttgart, 2024–2025 ===
Maier originally was going to retire in the summer of 2024, but decided to prolong her career in her hometown Stuttgart. On 20 August 2024, she joined VfB Stuttgart on a one-year contract. Following the end of the 2024–25 season, Maier announced her retirement from professional football.

== International career ==
Maier scored her first international goal in a friendly match against Canada on 19 July 2013. She scored in the 53rd minute, which resulted in a 1–0 win for Germany.

She has been selected for the squads of the 2015 FIFA Women's World Cup where Germany finished fourth, 2016 Summer Olympics, where Germany won the gold medal, the 2017 UEFA Women's Championship and the 2019 FIFA Women's World Cup.

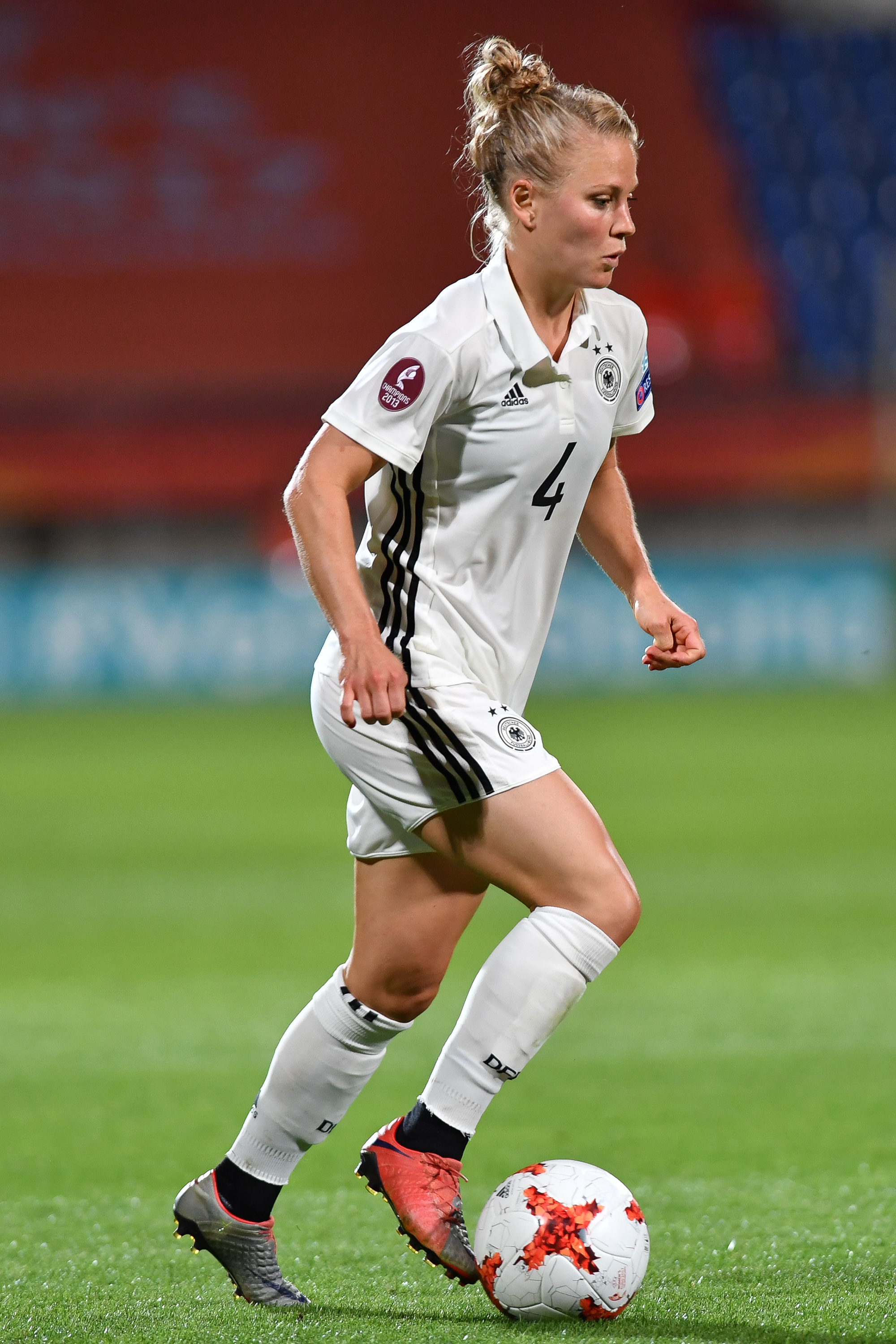
Maier in 2017

She announced her international retirement in February 2023.

== Career statistics ==
As of 26 October 2021

Appearances and goals by national team and year
National team	Year	Apps	Goals
Germany	2013	20	3
Germany	2014	2	0
Germany	2015	13	2
Germany	2016	14	2
Germany	2017	11	1
Germany	2018	9	2
Germany	2019	2	1
Germany	2020	4	0
Germany	2021	4	0
Total		79	11

Scores and results list Maier's goal tally first, score column indicates score after each Maier goal.

List of international goals scored by Leonie Maier
No.	Date	Venue	Opponent	Score	Result	Competition
1	19 June 2013	Paderborn, Germany	Canada	1–0	1–0	Friendly
2	29 June 2013	Munich, Germany	Japan	1–0	4–2	Friendly
3	26 October 2013	Koper, Slovenia	Slovenia	2–0	13–0	2015 FIFA Women's World Cup qualification
4	18 September 2015	Halle, Germany	Hungary	2–0	12–0	UEFA Women's Euro 2017 qualifying
5	22 October 2015	Wiesbaden, Germany	Russia	2–0	2–0	UEFA Women's Euro 2017 qualifying
6	3 March 2016	Tampa, United States	France	1–0	1–0	2016 SheBelieves Cup
7	16 September 2016	Khimki, Russia	Russia	2–0	4–0	UEFA Women's Euro 2017 qualifying
8	4 July 2017	Sandhausen, Germany	Brazil	3–1	3–1	Friendly
9	4 September 2018	Tórshavn, Faroe Islands	Faroe Islands	3–0	8–0	2019 FIFA Women's World Cup qualification
10	10 November 2018	Osnabrück, Germany	Italy	5–2	5–2	Friendly
11	3 September 2019	Lviv, Ukraine	Ukraine	8–0	8–0	UEFA Women's Euro 2021 qualifying

== Honours ==
Club

Bayern Munich

- Bundesliga: 2014–15, 2015–16

VfB Stuttgart

- Regionalliga Süd: 2024–25

International

Germany

- UEFA Women's Championship: 2013
- Summer Olympic Games Gold medal: 2016
- Algarve Cup: 2014

Germany U20

- FIFA U-20 Women's World Cup: runner-Up 2012

Germany U19

- UEFA U-19 Women's Championship: 2011

Germany U17

- UEFA U-17 Women's Championship: 2009
- FIFA U-17 Women's World Cup third place: 2008

Individual

- FIFPro: FIFA FIFPro World XI 2016
