= Tamar Dongus =

German footballer (born 1994)

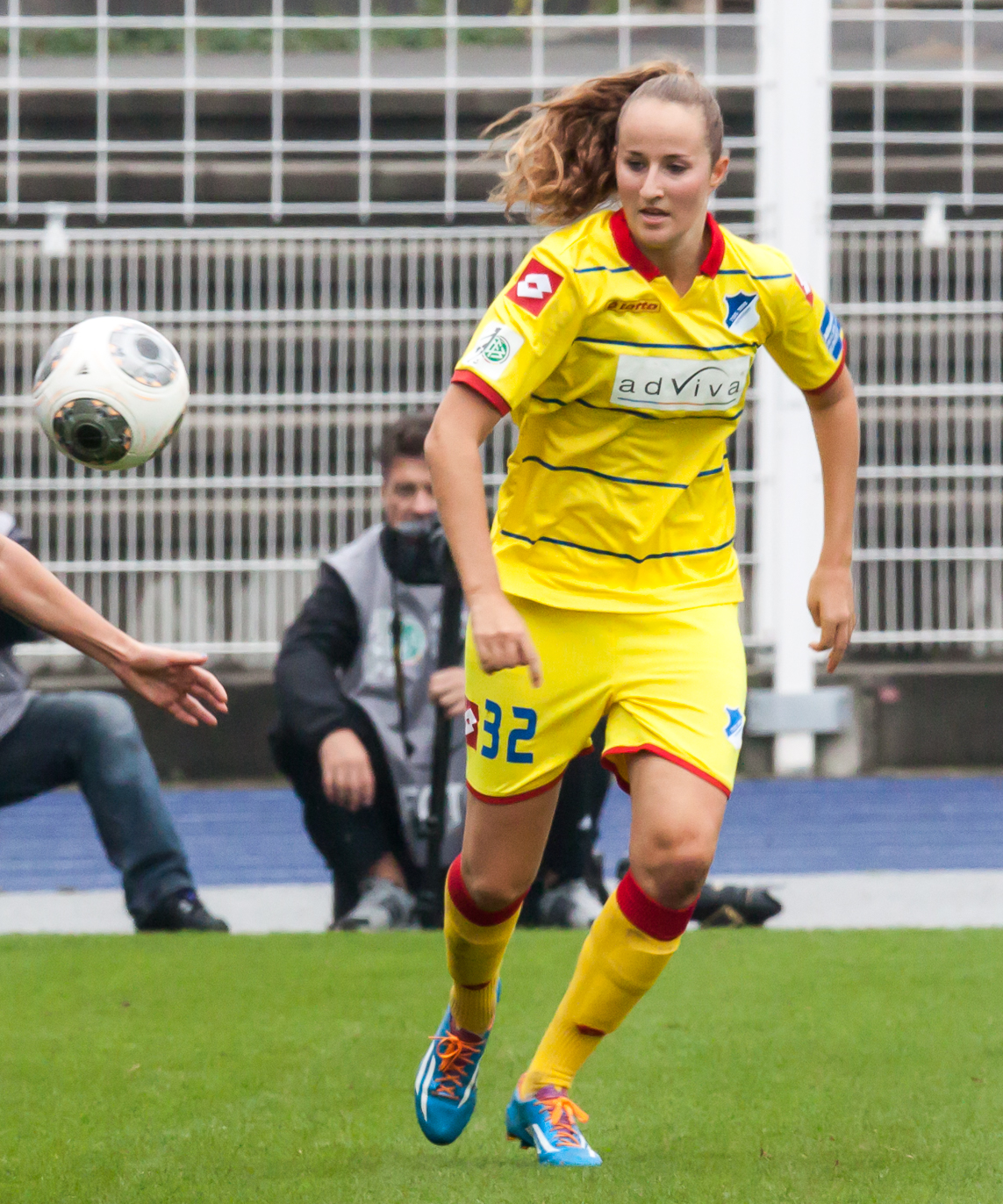
- Dongus in 2014

Personal information
- Date of birth: 11 May 1994 (age 32)
- Place of birth: Böblingen, Germany
- Height: 1.78 m (5 ft 10 in)
- Position: Defender

Team information
- Current team: VfB Stuttgart
- Number: 32

Senior career*
Years	Team	Apps	(Gls)
2010–2013	VfL Sindelfingen	22	(0)
2013–2018	TSG 1899 Hoffenheim	91	(0)
2018–2021	Florentia	54	(3)
2021–2023	Sassuolo	39	(3)
2023–2025	Grasshopper	33	(3)
2025–	VfB Stuttgart	26	(1)

International career
2009	Germany U15	1	(0)
2010	Germany U16	3	(1)
2010	Germany U17	2	(0)
2011–2012	Germany U19	3	(1)
- * Club domestic league appearances and goals as of 18 November 2026

Tamar Dongus (born 11 May 1994) is a German footballer who plays as a defender for German side VfB Stuttgart. She is the twin sister of Fabienne Dongus.
