= Linette Hofmann =

German footballer (born 2004)

Personal information
- Full name: Linette Hofmann
- Date of birth: 18 August 2004 (age 22)
- Place of birth: Germany
- Position: Defender

Team information
- Current team: VfB Stuttgart
- Number: 2

Youth career
- 2019–2020: TSG Hoffenheim

College career
| Years | Team | Apps | (Gls) |
| 2023 | Tennessee Volunteers | 13 | (0) |

Senior career*
| Years | Team | Apps | (Gls) |
| 2020–2023 | TSG Hoffenheim II | 54 | (4) |
| 2022–2023 | TSG Hoffenheim | 3 | (0) |
| 2024– | VfB Stuttgart | 41 | (4) |
- * Club domestic league appearances and goals as of 13 September 2026

Linette Hofmann (born 18 August 2004) is a German footballer who plays as a defender for VfB Stuttgart, having previously played for the Tennessee Volunteers and TSG 1899 Hoffenheim where she made three Frauen-Bundesliga appearances.
