= BFV-Pokal Frauen =

HISCOX Verbandspokal
- Founded: 2001
- Region: Bavaria
- Teams: 32
- Current champions: 1. FC Nürnberg II; (1st title)
- Most championships: SV 67 Weinberg (5 titles)
- Website: Official website
- 2024–25 BFV-Pokal Frauen

The BFV-Pokal of the Bavarian Football Association, currently known as Hiscox Association Cup, is a women's football tournament open to teams from Bavaria. The winner qualifies for the DFB-Pokal Frauen.

== Winners ==
| Year | Winner | Result | Runner up | Host city (final) |
|---|---|---|---|---|
| 2001–02 | 1. FC Nürnberg | 5–1 | TSV Uengershausen | Reichenberg |
| 2002–03 | Bayern Munich II | 9–3 | VfL Ehingen | Munich |
| 2003–04 | FC Memmingen | 5–0 | SC Regensburg | Regensburg |
| 2004–05 | SC Regensburg | 3–0 | SpVg Eicha | Eicha (Ahorn) |
| 2005–06 | SV 67 Weinberg | 0–0 (4–2 p) | TSV Uengershausen | Uengershausen |
| 2006–07 | TSV Uengershausen | 1–1 (4–3 p) | SpVg Eicha | Uengershausen |
| 2007–08 | TSV Schwaben Augsburg | 2–0 | 1. FC Nürnberg | Nuremberg |
| 2008–09 | SV 67 Weinberg | 4–1 | ETSV Würzburg | Weinberg (Aurach) |
| 2009–10 | ETSV Würzburg | 8–0 | 1. FC Nürnberg | Würzburg |
| 2010–11 | SV 67 Weinberg | 4–1 | ETSV Würzburg | Würzburg |
| 2011–12 | SV 67 Weinberg | 1–1 (6–5 p) | TSV Schwaben Augsburg | Augsburg |
| 2012–13 | SV 67 Weinberg | 1–1 | FFC Wacker München | Weinberg (Aurach) |
| 2013–14 | 1. FC Nürnberg | 5–0 | FC Forstern | Forstern |
| 2014–15 | 1. FC Nürnberg | 3–0 | FC Stern München | Munich |
| 2015–16 | 1. FC Nürnberg | 1–0 | TSV Schwaben Augsburg | Augsburg |
| 2016–17 | FFC Wacker München | 2–1 | ETSV Würzburg | Munich |
| 2017–18 | FC Forstern | 1–1 (6–4 p) | SV Frensdorf | Frensdorf |
| 2018–19 | FC Forstern | 2–1 | 1. FC Nürnberg | Burgweinting |
| 2019–20 | Cancelled due to COVID-19 pandemic. | | | |
| 2020–21 | Not organised due to COVID-19 pandemic. | | | |
| 2021–22 | FFC Wacker München | 4–1 | 1. FFC Hof | Hof |
| 2022–23 | FFC Wacker München | 3–0 | FC Würzburger Kickers | Würzburg |
| 2023–24 | 1. FC Nürnberg II | 5–3 | FC Forstern | Nuremberg |
