= Sascha Glass =

German football coach (born 1972)

Personal information
- Date of birth: 12 October 1972 (age 54)

Managerial career
- Years: Team
- 2011–2014: 1. FFC Frankfurt
- 2014–2017: VfL Wolfsburg women
- 2017–2019: SC Sand
- 2020–2023: 1. FC Köln women
- 2023–: VfB Stuttgart women (sports director)

Sascha Glass (born 12 October 1972) is a German football coach.

== Career ==
Glass managed women's teams including 1. FFC Frankfurt, VfL Wolfsburg, SC Sand and 1. FC Köln. He was appointed as the sports director of VfB Stuttgart women in June 2023.
