= Chantal Hagel =

German footballer

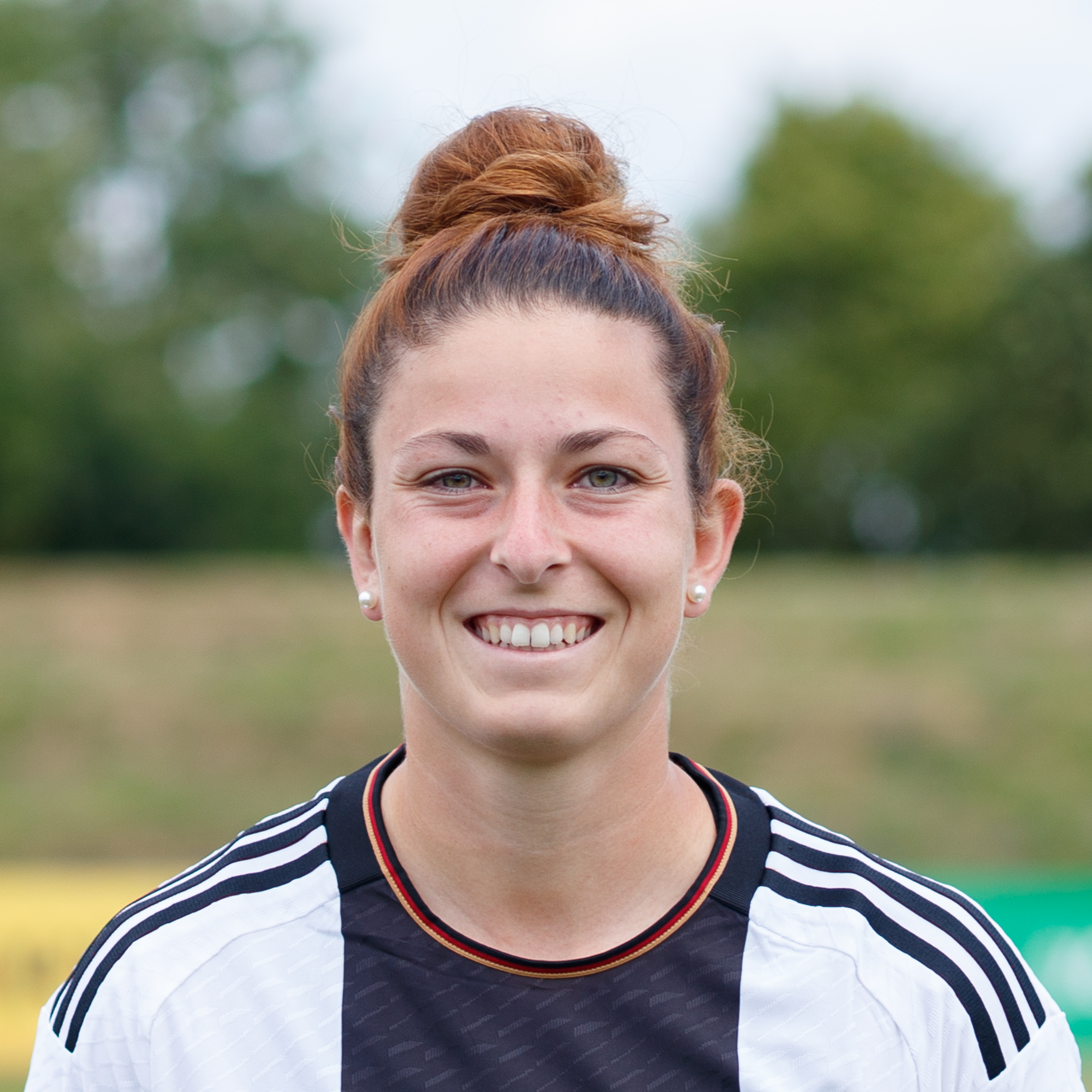
- Hagel in 2023

Personal information
- Full name: Chantal Hagel
- Date of birth: 20 July 1998 (age 28)
- Place of birth: Calw, Germany
- Height: 1.72 m (5 ft 8 in)
- Position: Central midfielder

Team information
- Current team: VfB Stuttgart
- Number: 6

Youth career
- VfL Nagold
- SV Eutingen
- –2015: SC Freiburg

Senior career*
Years	Team	Apps	(Gls)
2015–2016	SC Freiburg II		
2016–2019	1899 Hoffenheim II	68	(18)
2019–2023	1899 Hoffenheim	80	(15)
2023–2025	VfL Wolfsburg	30	(3)
2025–2026	Sevilla FC	22	(1)
2026–	VfB Stuttgart	9	(0)

International career^{‡}
2022–	Germany	13	(0)
- * Club domestic league appearances and goals as of 8 November 2026 ‡ National team caps and goals as of 14:45, 3 August 2023 (UTC)

Chantal Hagel (born 20 July 1998) is a German professional footballer who plays as a central midfielder for Frauen-Bundesliga club VfB Stuttgart and the Germany national team.

== Club career ==
Hagel began playing football in Eutingen im Gäu at SV Eutingen. Then she played for VfL Nagold until 2014. She then played for SC Freiburg's B youth team for a year before moving up to the second team. After just one season, she moved to Hoffenheim. She played for TSG 1899 Hoffenheim II from 2016 to 2019, first in the two-track Bundesliga, her last season in the meanwhile single-track 2nd Bundesliga, 68 league games in which she scored 18 goals.

She was promoted to Bundesliga club TSG 1899 Hoffenheim and made her debut on 24 August 2019 (matchday 2) in a 4–0 home win against 1. FC Köln, substituting for Franziska Harsch in the 74th minute. On 27 January 2023, VfL Wolfsburg announced that Chantal Hagel would be signed for the 2023/24 season.

On 7 July 2025, Hagel joined Spanish club Sevilla FC on a one-year contract, becoming the club's first-ever German player. In her season-long stint with Sevilla, Hagel made 25 appearances across all competitions and scored once.

In June 2026, Hagel signed for newly-promoted Frauen-Bundesliga club VfB Stuttgart on a two-year deal.

== International career ==
She made her debut for the senior national team as an international on 20 February 2022 in Norwich against Canada as part of the Arnold Clark Cup, substituting for Fabienne Dongus in the 82nd minute. The match finished as a 1–0 loss. Three days later – again coming on for Fabienne Dongus in the 72nd minute – she came on in the 3–1 defeat by England in Wolverhampton in the final game of the tournament.

== Career statistics ==
=== International ===
As of 3 August 2023

Germany
Year	Apps	Goals
2022	6	0
2023	7	0
Total	13	0
