= Mandy Islacker =

German footballer (born 1988)

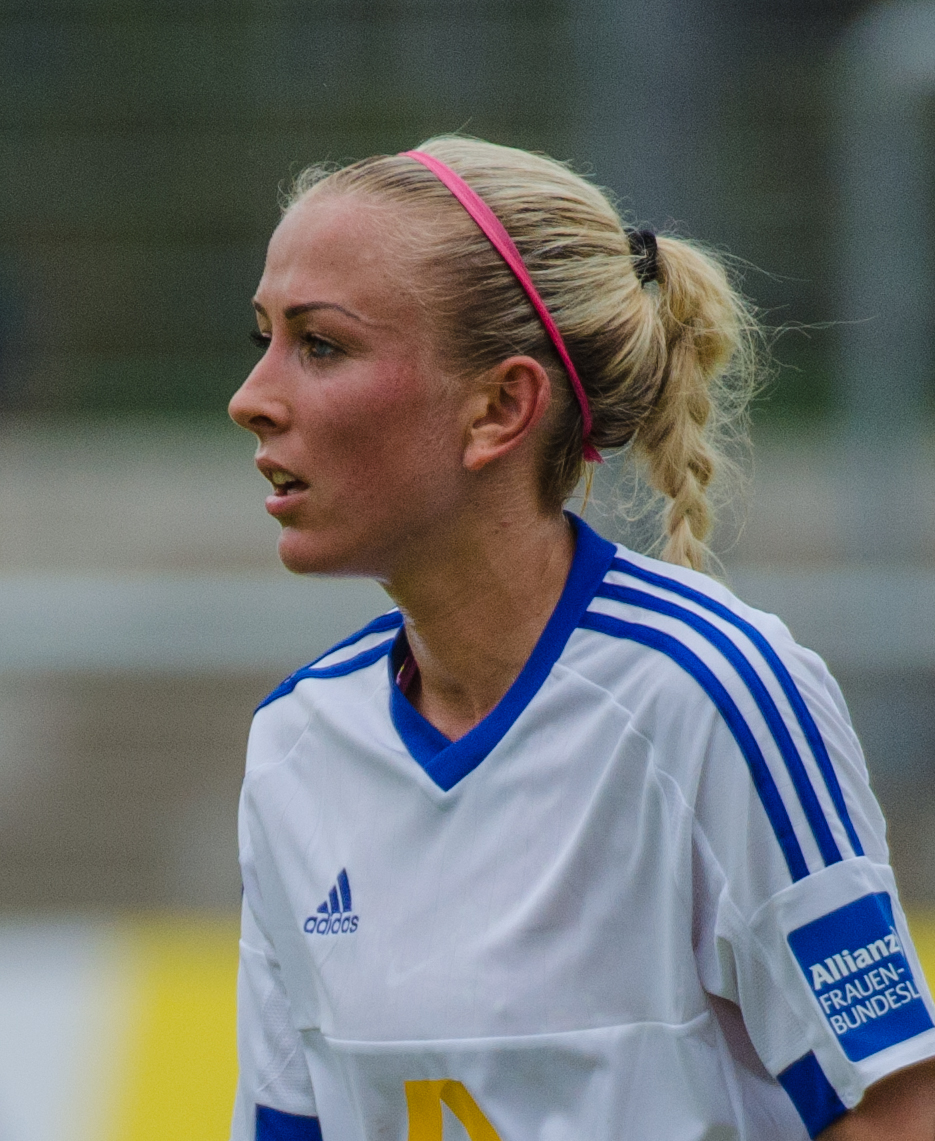
- Islacker in 2015

Personal information
- Full name: Mandy Islacker
- Date of birth: 8 August 1988 (age 38)
- Place of birth: Essen, West Germany
- Height: 1.64 m (5 ft 5 in)
- Position: Striker

Team information
- Current team: Schalke 04
- Number: 9

Youth career
- BV Altenessen
- Essener SG 99/06
- –2004: SG Essen-Schönebeck

Senior career*
Years	Team	Apps	(Gls)
2004–2006	FCR Duisburg	14	(3)
2006–2007	SGS Essen	8	(4)
2007–2010	Bayern Munich	31	(17)
2010–2013	FCR Duisburg	57	(32)
2013–2014	BV Cloppenburg	22	(12)
2014–2017	1. FFC Frankfurt	62	(41)
2017–2020	Bayern Munich	50	(22)
2020–2023	1. FC Köln	54	(27)
2023	FC Viktoria Köln	12	(58)
2024–2025	VfB Stuttgart	22	(28)
2025–	Schalke 04	11	(30)

International career
2015–2018	Germany	25	(5)
Medal record
Olympic Games
Gold medal – first place	2016 Rio de Janeiro	Team
- * Club domestic league appearances and goals as of 7 December 2025

Mandy Islacker (born 8 August 1988) is a German footballer who plays as a striker for Schalke 04.

== Club career ==
Islacker began her senior career at FCR Duisburg in 2004, where her team finished as Bundesliga runner-up twice in the 2004–05 and 2005–06 seasons. In 2006, she joined SGS Essen, then moved to Bayern Munich, achieving another runner-up finish in the 2008–09 season. She returned to FCR Duisburg in 2010 and later transferred to BV Cloppenburg in 2013.

In 2014, Islacker signed with 1. FFC Frankfurt, winning the 2014–15 Champions League and finishing as the top scorer in the Bundesliga for two consecutive seasons, 2015–16, 2016–17.

In July 2017, she returned to Bayern Munich, and secured three consecutive runner-up finishes in the 2017–18, 2018–19 and 2019–20 seasons.

In 2020, she joined 1. FC Köln, then moved to FC Viktoria Köln in 2023. In January 2024, she signed with VfB Stuttgart. At the conclusion of the 2024–25 season, with promotion to the 2. Bundesliga secured, Islacker announced she would be leaving the club to return to her native North Rhine-Westphalia for professional reasons.

In July 2025, she moved to Schalke 04.

== International career ==
Islacker was part of the squad for the 2016 Summer Olympics, where Germany won the gold medal.

== Personal life ==
She is the daughter of Frank Islacker and the granddaughter of Franz Islacker.

== Career statistics ==
Scores and results list Germany's goal tally first:

Islacker – goals for Germany
#	Date	Location	Opponent	Score	Result	Competition
1.	22 October 2015	Wiesbaden, Germany	Russia	1–0	2–0	UEFA Women's Euro 2017 qualifying
2.	25 October 2015	Sandhausen, Germany	Turkey	1–0	7–0	UEFA Women's Euro 2017 qualifying
3.	22 July 2016	Paderborn, Germany	Ghana	10–0	11–0	Friendly
4.	25 October 2016	Aalen, Germany	Netherlands	1–0	4–2	Friendly
5.	25 October 2016	Aalen, Germany	Netherlands	2–0	4–2	Friendly

== Honours ==
Club

FCR Duisburg

- Bundesliga runner-up: 2004–05, 2005–06

Bayern Munich

- Bundesliga runner-up: 2008–09, 2017–18, 2018–19, 2019–20

1. FFC Frankfurt

- UEFA Women's Champions League: 2014–15
- Bundesliga top scorer: 2015–16, 2016–17

VfB Stuttgart

- Regionalliga Süd: 2024–25

International

Germany

- Summer Olympic Games gold medal: 2016

Individual

- Bundesliga top scorer: 2015–16, 2016–17
- Regionalliga Süd top scorer: 2024–25
