= Karlsruher SC (women) =

- Full name: Karlsruher Sport-Club Mühlburg-Phönix e. V.
- Founded: 2001; 25 years ago
- Ground: Carl-Kaufmann-Stadion, Karlsruhe
- Capacity: 2,068/2,468
- President: Holger Siegmund-Schultze
- Manager: Anil Yildiz
- League: Regionalliga Süd
- 2024–25: 5th
| Home colours | Away colours |

Karlsruher SC is a women's association football club from Karlsruhe, Germany. It is part of the Karlsruher SC club.

== History ==
Karlsruher SC was established following the dissolution of DFC Eggenstein in 2001. In DFC Eggenstein's final season, they achieved promotion to the Verbandsliga, which allowed their successor, Karlsruher SC, to qualify for the 2001–02 DFB-Pokal. However, Karlsruher SC faced a historic 20–0 defeat in the first round against the eventual champions, 1. FFC Frankfurt.

Initially, the club competed in the Oberliga Baden-Württemberg, securing promotion as champions to the newly formed 2. Frauen-Bundesliga for the 2004–05 season. However, internal disputes led to a significant exodus in January 2005, with much of the team, the coach, and the head of the department leaving to join ASV Hagsfeld.

In their debut season in the second division, Karlsruher SC narrowly avoided relegation, staying ahead of SV Jungingen on goal difference. The following season, they finished 11th, which normally meant relegation, but due to VfL Sindelfingen's relegation from the Bundesliga, their reserve team, VfL Sindelfingen II, was relegated instead. In the 2006–07 season, Karlsruher SC again finished 11th and was relegated to the Regionalliga Süd. Two seasons later, they finished second behind Bayern Munich II, missing out on promotion. The next season saw an 8th place finish, leading to relegation to the Oberliga.

In the 2011–12 season, they finished as runners-up and were promoted to the Regionalliga, only to face immediate relegation. After finishing second in the 2018–19 season, they topped the table in the 2019–20 season, which was cut short due to the COVID-19 pandemic, earning promotion back to the third division.

Starting from the 2021–22 season, Karlsruher SC relocated to the Sportzentrum in Bruchsal, a facility also used by 1. FC Bruchsal.

== Squad ==
As of 25 June 2024

Note: Flags indicate national team as defined under FIFA eligibility rules; some limited exceptions apply. Players may hold more than one non-FIFA nationality.

| No. | Pos. | Nation | Player |
|---|---|---|---|
| 1 | GK | GER | Christin David |
| 2 | MF | GER | Pia Nagel |
| 3 | DF | GER | Marie Buchleiter |
| 4 | DF | CRO | Jana Mijatović |
| 5 | DF | GER | Chantal Kirtzakis |
| 6 | MF | GER | Anna Hornetz |
| 7 | DF | GER | Natalie Klupp |
| 8 | MF | GER | Lena Kasprzyk |
| 9 | MF | GER | Leonie Kuhlmann |
| 10 | FW | GER | Melissa Zweigner-Genzer |
| 11 | MF | GER | Noelle Maier |
| 12 | FW | GER | Mathilda Dillmann |
| 13 | DF | GER | Lisa Drexler |
| 15 | DF | GER | Madeleine Haas |
| 16 | DF | GER | Neele Beck |
| 17 | MF | GER | Helena Merkle |
| 18 | MF | GER | Nele Schomaker |

| No. | Pos. | Nation | Player |
|---|---|---|---|
| 19 | MF | GER | Selina Häfele (captain) |
| 20 | FW | GER | Johanna Lackus |
| 22 | FW | SRB | Milica Kuburović |
| 23 | GK | GER | Melanie Döbke |
| 24 | GK | GER | Gabriela Heid |
| 26 | FW | GER | Karla Waibel |
| 29 | MF | GER | Jennifer Amann |
| 30 | MF | GER | Runa Kreutzer |
| 32 | GK | GER | Saskia Wagner |
| — | DF | GER | Romina Konrad |
| — | MF | GER | Selina Reule |
| — | MF | GER | Hannah Roth |
| — | MF | GER | Laura Bertsch |
| — | FW | GRE | Sofia Inguanta |
