= 2024–25 Frauen-Regionalliga Süd =

Frauen-Regionalliga Süd
- Season: 2024–25
- Dates: 1 September 2024 – 18 May 2025
- Matches played: 132
- Goals scored: 582 (4.41 per match)
- Top goalscorer: (Germany) Mandy Islacker (28 goals)
- Biggest home win: VfB Stuttgart 12–0 TSV Schwaben Augsburg; 18 May 2025
- Biggest away win: 1. FFC Hof 1–11 VfB Stuttgart; 8 March 2025
- Highest scoring: 1. FFC Hof 1–11 VfB Stuttgart; 8 March 2025
- Longest winning run: 10 matches VfB Stuttgart; TSG Hoffenheim II
- Longest unbeaten run: 22 matches VfB Stuttgart
- Longest winless run: 16 matches 1. FFC Hof
- Longest losing run: 13 matches 1. FFC Hof
- Highest attendance: 1,809; Jahn Calden 1–6 VfB Stuttgart; 27 October 2024
- Lowest attendance: 35; Eintracht Frankfurt III 1–1 Karlsruher SC; 27 October 2024
- Attendance: 21,622 (164 per match)
- All statistics correct as of 18 May 2025.

The 2024–25 season of the Frauen-Regionalliga Süd was the 21st season of the top league of South German Football Association in women's football. The 2024–25 Regionalliga Süd was one of the five regional leagues that serve as the third-tier women's league in Germany.

== Teams ==
Locations of teams in the 2024–25 Frauen-Regionalliga Süd.

=== Team changes ===
Entering league		Exiting league	
Promoted from 2023 to 2024 lower-level leagues	Relegated from 2023–24 2. Bundesliga	Promoted to 2024–25 2. Bundesliga	Relegated to 2024–25 lower-level leagues
VfB Stuttgart (from Oberliga Baden-Württemberg); SC Sand II (from Oberliga Baden-Württemberg) (Note: Since TSG Lütter, the champion of Hessenliga, did not ascend, the extra spot was given to the winner of a play-off between SC Sand II, the runner-up of Oberliga Baden-Württemberg, and FC Ruderting, the runner-up of Bayernliga); TSV Schwaben Augsburg (from Bayernliga)	TSG Hoffenheim II	SC Freiburg II	TSV Neuenstein (to Oberliga Baden-Württemberg); Würzburger Kickers (to Bayernliga); SC Dortelweil (to Hessenliga)

=== Promotion from lower-level leagues ===
The champions of the Oberliga Baden-Württemberg, Bayernliga and Hessenliga are promoted. In case no team gets relegated to Regionalliga Süd from 2024–25 2. Bundesliga, an extra promotion spot is awarded to one of the runners-up.

== League table ==
Pos	Team	Pld	W	D	L	GF	GA	GD	Pts	Qualification or relegation
1	VfB Stuttgart (P)	22	20	2	0	116	16	+100	62	Promotion to 2. Bundesliga
2	TSG Hoffenheim II (Note: Reserve teams cannot compete at the same league level as the respective main team. Ineligible for promotion if the main team gets relegated to 2. Bundesliga.)	22	19	2	1	81	20	+61	59	
3	Wacker München	22	13	5	4	47	34	+13	44	
4	Kickers Offenbach	22	12	3	7	60	39	+21	39	
5	Karlsruher SC	22	11	5	6	65	43	+22	38	
6	Jahn Calden	22	11	3	8	43	47	−4	36	
7	Hessen Wetzlar	22	10	2	10	47	48	−1	32	
8	SC Sand II (Note: Reserve teams cannot compete at the same league level as the respective main team. Ineligible for promotion unless the main team earns promotion to Bundesliga.)	22	4	9	9	34	48	−14	21	
9	Eintracht Frankfurt III (R)	22	5	3	14	29	65	−36	18	Relegation to lower-level leagues
10	SV Hegnach (R)	22	3	3	16	27	53	−26	12	Relegation to lower-level leagues
11	Schwaben Augsburg (R)	22	3	2	17	20	76	−56	11	Relegation to lower-level leagues
12	1. FFC Hof (R)	22	1	1	20	13	93	−80	4	Relegation to lower-level leagues

Updated to match(es) played on 18 May 2025. Source: Fussball.de
Rules for classification: Tiebreakers
(P) Promoted; (R) Relegated

== Results ==
Home \ Away	AUG	CAL	FR3	HEG	HOF	HO2	KAR	MUN	OFF	SA2	STU	WET
Schwaben Augsburg		2–3	2–2	0–3	3–0	1–2	1–5	0–2	0–2	1–3	0–1	1–4
Jahn Calden	2–1		4–1	3–1	5–0	1–4	2–3	0–3	2–0	4–1	1–6	1–4
Eintracht Frankfurt III	3–0	0–1		6–3	3–1	1–5	1–1	0–1	1–4	0–2	0–11	1–3
SV Hegnach	0–1	0–4	3–0		4–1	1–4	0–1	1–2	1–2	1–1	0–5	1–1
1. FFC Hof	1–2	0–2	0–2	2–1		0–10	1–5	1–3	0–4	1–2	1–11	1–2
TSG Hoffenheim II	8–1	4–0	2–0	4–0	4–0		4–3	4–0	2–0	6–0	1–4	2–1
Karlsruher SC	3–2	2–2	7–3	4–1	8–0	1–2		3–3	4–0	2–2	0–5	4–1
Wacker München	4–1	1–1	1–0	1–1	2–0	1–3	2–1		3–0	3–3	1–5	2–2
Kickers Offenbach	9–0	5–1	5–0	4–2	5–0	2–2	2–4	1–5		2–1	1–1	4–2
SC Sand II	1–1	1–1	1–1	2–1	1–1	1–2	2–2	1–2	3–3		2–6	0–2
VfB Stuttgart	12–0	7–1	6–1	2–1	10–0	2–2	3–0	4–1	4–0	4–3		3–0
Hessen Wetzlar	6–0	1–2	2–3	3–1	4–2	0–4	4–2	2–4	1–5	2–1	0–4	

Updated to match(es) played on 18 May 2025. Source: Fussball.de
Legend: Blue = home team win; Yellow = draw; Red = away team win.

== Top goalscorers ==
As of 18 May 2025

Rank	Player	Team	Goals
1	(Germany) Mandy Islacker	VfB Stuttgart	28
2	(Germany) Johanna Hildebrandt	Jahn Calden	17
2	(Germany) Melissa Zweigner-Genzer	Karlsruher SC	17
4	(Germany) Jana Beuschlein	VfB Stuttgart	16
4	(Germany) Meike Meßmer	VfB Stuttgart	16
6	(Germany) Ann-Sophie Braun	TSG Hoffenheim II	15
7	(Germany) Lisa Maier	Hessen Wetzlar	14
8	(Germany) Mathilda Dillmann	Karlsruher SC	13
8	(Switzerland) Julia Glaser	VfB Stuttgart	13
10	(Germany) Sonja Kolb	Wacker München	11
