= Rieke Dieckmann =

German footballer (born 1996)

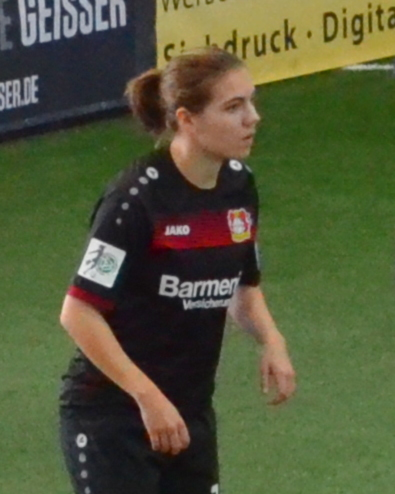
- Dieckmann in 2017

Personal information
- Date of birth: 16 August 1996 (age 30)
- Place of birth: Bissendorf, Germany
- Height: 1.67 m (5 ft 6 in)
- Position: Midfielder

Team information
- Current team: Racing Power
- Number: 17

Senior career*
Years	Team	Apps	(Gls)
2012–2016	SV Meppen	77	(20)
2016–2017	Bayer Leverkusen	13	(0)
2017–2018	MSV Duisburg	21	(0)
2018–2021	Turbine Potsdam	39	(4)
2021	→ FC Twente (loan)	10	(2)
2021–2026	Werder Bremen	86	(3)
2026–	Racing Power	6	(1)

International career^{‡}
2013	Germany U17	6	(1)
2014–2015	Germany U19	7	(0)
2014	Germany U20	6	(0)
- * Club domestic league appearances and goals as of 5 November 2026 ‡ National team caps and goals as of 22 April 2019

Rieke Dieckmann (born 16 August 1996) is a German footballer who plays as a midfielder for Portuguese Campeonato Nacional Feminino club Racing Power.

In May 2018 it was announced that she would play for Turbine Potsdam in the 2018–19 season.
