= Reena Wichmann =

German footballer (born 1998)

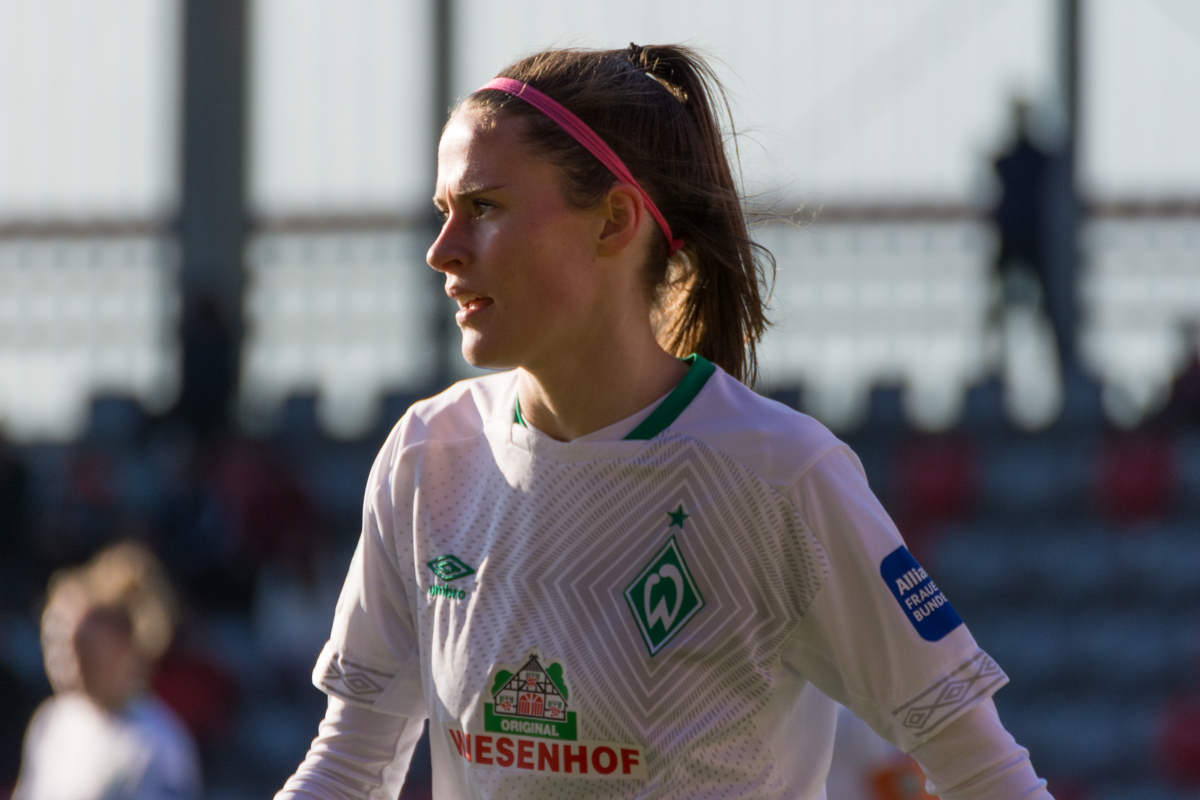
- Wichmann in 2018 with Werder Bremen

Personal information
- Date of birth: 12 January 1998 (age 28)
- Place of birth: Düsseldorf, Germany
- Height: 1.70 m (5 ft 7 in)
- Position: Midfielder

Team information
- Current team: VfB Stuttgart
- Number: 28

Youth career
- -2013: VfL 07 Bremen
- 2015-2017: Werder Bremen

College career
Years	Team	Apps	(Gls)
2017	Elon Phoenix	17	(3)

Senior career*
Years	Team	Apps	(Gls)
2015–2017	Werder Bremen	24	(8)
2018–2026	Werder Bremen	117	(8)
2026–	VfB Stuttgart	15	(2)
- * Club domestic league appearances and goals as of 23 September 2026

Reena Wichmann (born 12 January 1998) is a German footballer who plays as a midfielder for Frauen-Bundesliga club VfB Stuttgart.
