= Jobina Lahr =

German footballer (born 1991)

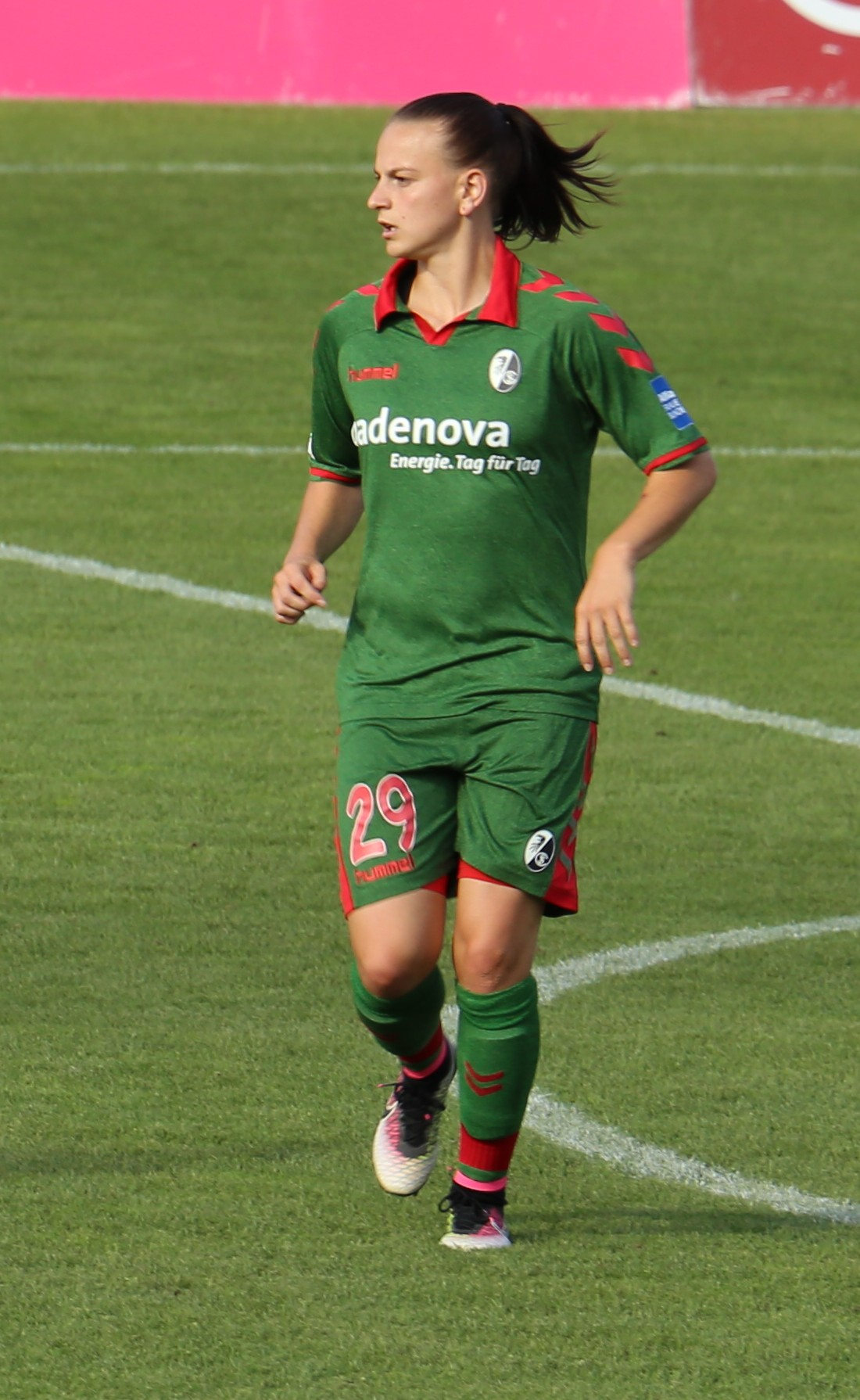
- Lahr with SC Freiburg in 2016

Personal information
- Full name: Jobina Verena Lahr
- Date of birth: 19 October 1991 (age 35)
- Position: Midfielder

Youth career
- Viktoria Klein-Zimmern
- SV Münster
- SC Hassia Dieburg
- –2008: TGM SV Jügesheim

Senior career*
Years	Team	Apps	(Gls)
2008–2009	1. FFC Frankfurt II	16	(1)
2009–2010	Hamburger SV II	23	(6)
2010–2011	Hamburger SV	17	(1)
2011–2012	1. FC Lokomotive Leipzig	9	(0)
2012–2022	SC Freiburg	81	(2)
2022	SC Freiburg II	5	(1)
2023–2026	Hamburger SV	52	(7)

International career
2012	Germany U23	1	(0)
- * Club domestic league appearances and goals as of 04:46, 27 August 2026 (UTC)

Jobina Verena Lahr (born 19 October 1991) is a German footballer who plays as a midfielder.

== Club career ==
Lahr started her senior career at 1. FFC Frankfurt II, before joining Hamburger SV in 2009, followed by 1. FC Lokomotive Leipzig in 2011. She later spent most of her career at SC Freiburg, playing for a decade between 2012 and 2022. In 2023, she returned to her former club Hamburger SV.
