= Forstern =

- Municipality
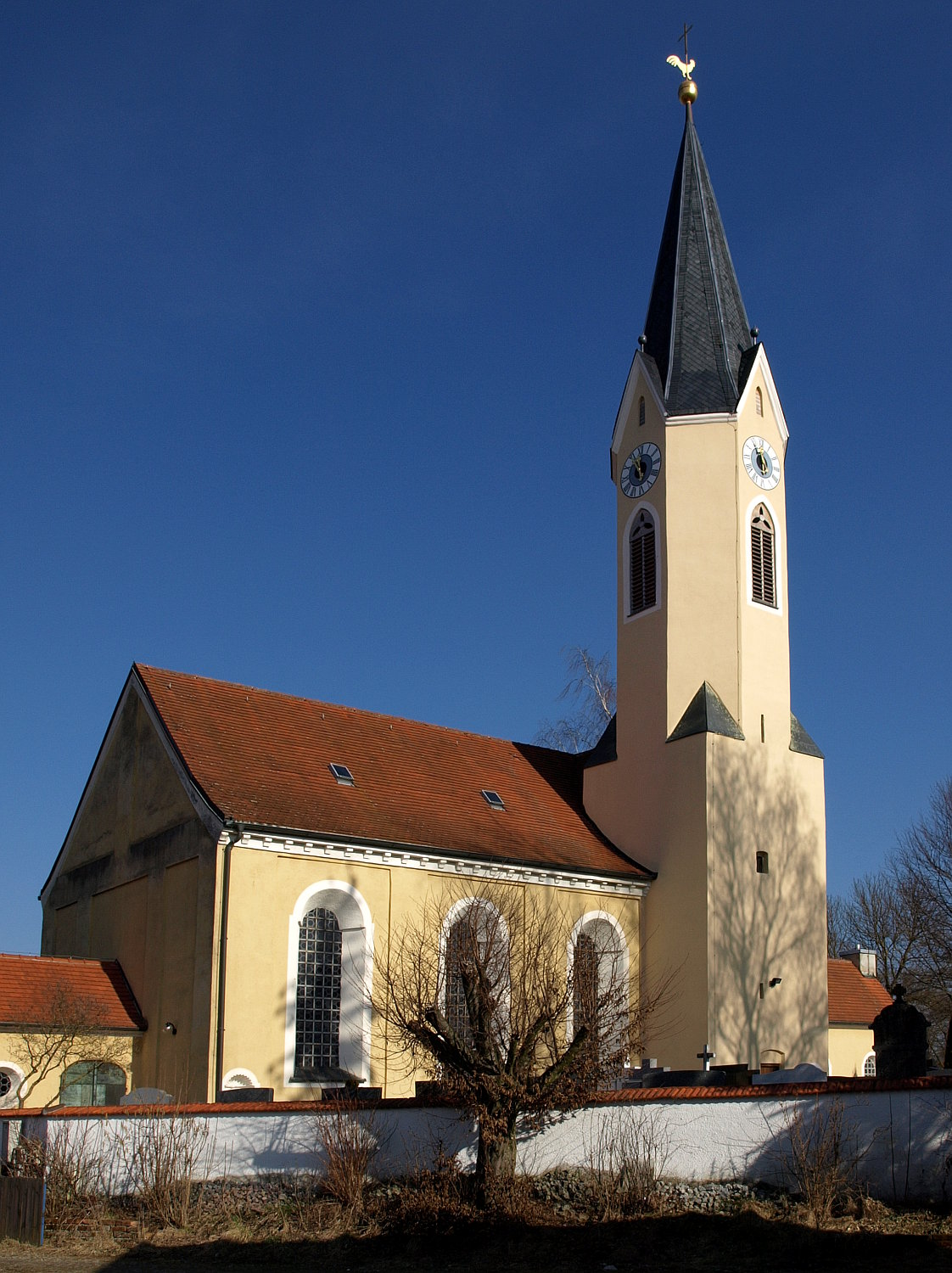
- Church of Saint Peter

- Coat of arms

- Location of Forstern within Erding district
- Interactive map of Forstern
- Location within Germany Location within Bavaria
- Coordinates: 48°11′N 11°59′E
- Country: Germany
- State: Bavaria
- Admin. region: Oberbayern
- District: Erding

Government
  - Mayor (2020–26): Rainer Streu

Area
  - Total: 15.38 km^{2} (5.94 sq mi)
- Elevation: 520 m (1,710 ft)

Population (2025-12-31)
  - Total: 3,667
  - Density: 238.4/km^{2} (617.5/sq mi)
- Time zone: UTC+01:00 (CET)
  - Summer (DST): UTC+02:00 (CEST)
- Postal codes: 85659
- Dialling codes: 08124
- Vehicle registration: ED
- Website: www.gmd-forstern.de

Forstern (German pronunciation: [ˈfɔʁstɐn]) is a municipality in the district of Erding in Bavaria in Germany.
