= VfB Stuttgart (women) =

- Founded: 31 May 2021; 5 years ago
- Ground: Stadion Hafenbahnstraße, Stuttgart
- Capacity: 2,000
- President: Dietmar Allgaier
- Chairman: Alexander Wehrle
- Head coach: Heiko Gerber
- League: Bundesliga
- 2025–26: 2. Bundesliga, 1st of 14 (promoted)
Home colours	Away colours	Third colours

VfB Stuttgart (German pronunciation: [faʊ̯ɛfˈbeː ˈʃtʊtɡaʁt]) is a German women's association football team based in Stuttgart, Baden-Württemberg.

== History ==
VfB Stuttgart founded its women's football department on 31 May 2021. Since 1 July 2022, the first women's team has been part of VfB Stuttgart 1893 AG, the company that operates the professional football department of the club. The women's team started competing in the 2022–23 season, with plans for multiple teams in cooperation with VfB Obertürkheim whose women's football department officially established in 1994.

Heiko Gerber became head coach on 28 July 2022, succeeding Lisa Lang, who remained as team manager. Sascha Glass was appointed as sporting director in June 2023. In the 2023–24 season, the club finished top of Oberliga Baden-Württemberg, securing promotion to the Regionalliga Süd. On 18 May 2025, the club clinched the 2024–25 division title with a commanding 12–0 win over TSV Schwaben Augsburg, earning promotion to the 2. Bundesliga. A year later, on 10 May, they secured back-to-back promotion to the Bundesliga by sealing the second division title with a 4–1 victory over VfL Wolfsburg II.

== Squad ==
As of 12 July 2026

Note: Flags indicate national team as defined under FIFA eligibility rules; some limited exceptions apply. Players may hold more than one non-FIFA nationality.

No.	Pos.	Nation	Player
1	GK	ITA	Laura Giuliani
2	DF	GER	Linette Hofmann
3	DF	GER	Lenelotte Müller
4	DF	GER	Katharina Schäfer
5	DF	GER	Greta Stegemann
6	MF	GER	Chantal Hagel
7	MF	GER	Dafina Redzepi
8	DF	GER	Maximiliane Rall (captain)
9	FW	GER	Julia Glaser
10	FW	JPN	Haruka Osawa
11	FW	GER	Rosa Rückert
12	GK	GER	Kiara Beck
16	DF	GER	Janina Hechler
17	MF	GER	Muriel Dürr
18	DF	GER	Julia Mickenhagen
19	MF	JPN	Yuka Hirano

No.	Pos.	Nation	Player
20	FW	GER	Jana Beuschlein
21	FW	GER	Mira Arouna
22	MF	POL	Adriana Achcińska
23	DF	GER	Luzie Zähringer
24	DF	PHI	Katana Norman
25	GK	GER	Eve Boettcher
26	FW	AUT	Nicole Billa
27	MF	GER	Leonie Schetter
28	MF	GER	Reena Wichmann
31	FW	GER	Verena Wieder
32	DF	GER	Tamar Dongus
33	MF	GER	Fabienne Dongus
34	MF	GER	Svenja Hecke
35	MF	GER	Laura Carollo

== Former Players ==
- (Bosnia and Herzegovina) Farah Jusufovic

== Current staff ==
As of 22 June 2024

Coaching staff
(Germany) Heiko Gerber	Head coach
(Germany) Ersin Canpolat (Germany) Marc Stütz	Assistant coach
(United States) Desmond Thompson	Athletic trainer
Managerial staff
(Germany) Sascha Glass	Sporting director
(Germany) Lisa Lang	Team manager
(Germany) Ralph Munz	Game manager
(Germany) Tobias Schwaab (Germany) Jürgen Gehrung	Equipment manager
Medical department
(Germany) Lena Grannemann (Germany) Thomas Weigele	Physiotherapist
