= Fabienne Dongus =

German footballer

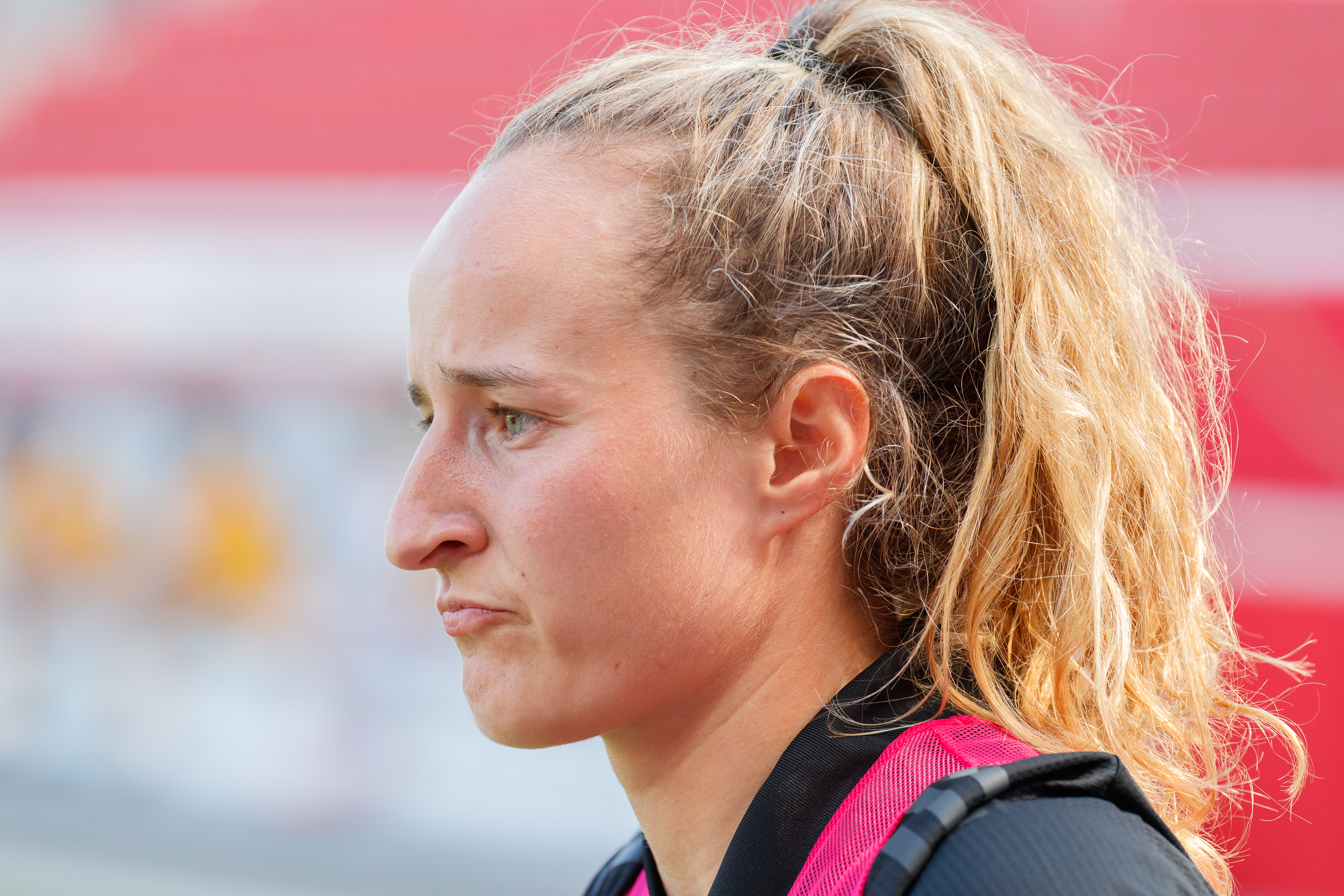
- Dongus in 2021

Personal information
- Date of birth: 11 May 1994 (age 32)
- Place of birth: Böblingen, Germany
- Height: 1.78 m (5 ft 10 in)
- Position: Midfielder

Team information
- Current team: VfB Stuttgart
- Number: 33

Youth career
- 1999–2006: SV Deckenpfronn
- 2006–2011: VfL Sindelfingen

Senior career*
Years	Team	Apps	(Gls)
2010–2013	VfL Sindelfingen	61	(19)
2013–2025	TSG Hoffenheim	186	(20)
2015	TSG Hoffenheim II	4	(1)
2025–	VfB Stuttgart	26	(4)

International career^{‡}
2010	Germany U16	6	(4)
2010–2011	Germany U17	4	(5)
2012–2013	Germany U19	10	(4)
2021–	Germany	5	(0)
- * Club domestic league appearances and goals as of 8 November 2026 ‡ National team caps and goals as of 21:00, 8 September 2022 (UTC)

Fabienne Dongus (born 11 May 1994) is a German footballer who plays as a midfielder for VfB Stuttgart and the Germany women's national team.

== Career ==
Dongus made her international debut for Germany in a friendly on 10 April 2021, coming on as a substitute in the 73rd minute for Sara Däbritz against Australia. The home match finished as a 5–2 win for Germany.

== Career statistics ==
=== International ===
As of 6 September 2022

Germany
Year	Apps	Goals
2021	2	0
2022	3	0
Total	5	0
