= 1993–94 DFB-Pokal Frauen =

Tournament details
- Country: Germany
- Teams: 46

Final positions
- Champions: Grün-Weiß Brauweiler
- Runners-up: TSV Siegen

Tournament statistics
- Matches played: 45

The Frauen DFB-Pokal 1993–94 was the 14th season of the cup competition, Germany's second-most important title in women's football. In the final which was held in Berlin on 14 May 1994 Grün-Weiß Brauweiler met TSV Siegen just as in the previous season. This time Brauweiler won 2–1, thus winning their second cup title. In a reissue of the cup final four weeks later Siegen defeated Brauweiler 1–0 in the final of championship.

== First round ==
Several clubs had byes in the first round. Those clubs were automatically qualified for the 2nd round of the cup. For reasons unknown TuS Wörrstadt and FC Rumeln-Kaldenhausen chose not to attend. The first round was held from 7 July to 11 August 1993.

FC Sankt Augustin	0 – 5	VfB Rheine
SV Brackel	2 – 0	KBC Duisburg
SV Viktoria Gersten	1 – 4	SSG Bergisch Gladbach
BSV Müssen	0 – 5	Grün-Weiß Brauweiler
Fortuna Dilkrath	0 – 12	TSV Siegen
Hertha Zehlendorf	0 – 5	Tennis Borussia Berlin
Polizei SV Rostock	4 – 2	Fortuna Sachsenroß Hannover
Wittenseer SV	0 – 6	VfR Eintracht Wolfsburg
TSV Schwaben Augsburg	1 – 2	VfL Sindelfingen
TSV Ludwigsburg	0 – 5	TuS Niederkirchen
SV Zussdorf	1 – 5	Klinge Seckach
SV Weißkirchen	0 – 8	VfR 09 Saarbrücken
TSV Eschollbrücken	0 – 5	FSV Frankfurt
SC 07 Bad Neuenahr	2 – 7	SG Praunheim

== Second round ==
The second round was held on 28–29 August 1993.

SV Brackel	0 – 9	TSV Siegen
Teutonia Weiden	1 – 2	SSG Bergisch Gladbach
FT Geestemünde	0 – 12	Grün-Weiß Brauweiler
STV Lövenich	0 – 2	VfB Rheine
SV Rheinfreunde Düsseldorf	2 – 5	TV Jahn Delmenhorst
SV Moorfleet	1 – 9	VfR Eintracht Wolfsburg
Turbine Potsdam	4 – 5	Tennis Borussia Berlin
Polizei SV Rostock	4 – 0	SG Erbstorf
TSV Crailsheim	0 – 5	SG Praunheim
Fortuna Magdeburg	0 – 6	TSV Battenberg
Uni SV Jena	0 – 5	TuS Ahrbach
Viktoria Neckarhausen	0 – 5	FSV Frankfurt
SC Siegelbach	0 – 11	VfR 09 Saarbrücken
Bayern Munich	1 – 4	Klinge Seckach
Wacker München	0 – 1	TuS Niederkirchen
FC Sankt Georgen	1 – 5	VfL Sindelfingen

== Third round ==
The third round was held on 7 November 1993.

VfB Rheine	1 – 1	TuS Niederkirchen	(2–0 on penalties)
VfL Sindelfingen	1 – 1	VfR 09 Saarbrücken	(5–6 on penalties)
Klinge Seckach	4 – 1	VfR Eintracht Wolfsburg
TSV Battenberg	2 – 1	FSV Frankfurt
Polizei SV Rostock	2 – 1	SSG Bergisch Gladbach
SG Praunheim	0 – 2	TSV Siegen
TuS Ahrbach	1 – 0	Tennis Borussia Berlin
Grün-Weiß Brauweiler	6 – 0	TV Jahn Delmenhorst

== Quarter-finals ==
The quarter-finals were held on 28 November 1993 and 13 February 1994.

Klinge Seckach	4 – 1	Polizei SV Rostock
Grün-Weiß Brauweiler	7 – 1	TSV Battenberg
TSV Siegen	2 – 0	VfB Rheine
TuS Ahrbach	2 – 4	VfR 09 Saarbrücken	(aet)

== Semi-finals ==
The semi-finals were held on 20 April 1994.

Klinge Seckach	1 – 4	TSV Siegen
VfR 09 Saarbrücken	2 – 9	Grün-Weiß Brauweiler

== Final ==
14 May 1994

Grün-Weiß Brauweiler	2 – 1	TSV Siegen
A. Klein 49'; Wiegman 50'		Fitschen 67'

Olympic Stadium (Berlin)
Attendance: 30,000
Referee: Elke Günther (Bamberg)

GRÜN-WEISS BRAUWEILER:
GK	1	(Germany) Manuela Goller
DF		(Germany) Claudia Klein
DF		(Germany) Andrea Klein	(substituted off) 79'
DF		(United States) Megan Hanushek
MF		(Germany) Sandra Hengst
MF		(Hungary) Tünde Nagy
MF		(Germany) Bettina Wiegmann
MF		(Germany) Natascha Schwind
MF		(Germany) Anja Koser
FW		(Germany) Gudrun Gottschlich
FW		(Germany) Patrcia Menge	(substituted off) 74'
Substitutes:
DF		(Germany) Alexandra Reimann	(substituted on) 79'
FW		(Hungary) Gyöngyi Lovász-Anton	(substituted on) 74'

TSV SIEGEN:
GK	1	(Germany) Silke Rottenberg
DF		(Germany) Andrea Euteneuer
DF		(Germany) Jutta Nardenbach
DF		(Netherlands) Loes Camper
MF		(Germany) Conny Trauschke
MF		(Germany) Silvia Neid
MF		(Germany) Martina Voss
MF		(Germany) Doris Fitschen
MF		(Germany) Heike Czyganowski	(substituted off) 26'
FW		(Germany) Michaela Kubat
FW		(Germany) Gaby Mink
Substitutes:
MF		(Germany) Christina Chaladyniak	(substituted on) 26' (substituted off) 63'
MF		(Germany) Karin Sänger	(substituted on) 63'

== See also ==
- Bundesliga 1993–94
- 1993–94 DFB-Pokal men's competition
