= 1988–89 DFB-Pokal Frauen =

Tournament details
- Country: Germany
- Teams: 16

Final positions
- Champions: TSV Siegen
- Runners-up: FSV Frankfurt

Tournament statistics
- Matches played: 16
- Goals scored: 70 (4.38 per match)

The Frauen DFB-Pokal 1988–89 was the 9th season of the cup competition, Germany's second-most important title in women's football. In the final which was held in Berlin on 24 June 1989 TSV Siegen defeated FSV Frankfurt 5–1, thus winning their fourth cup in a row. It was their fourth cup title overall, too.

== Participants ==
| Northern region | Western region | Southwestern region | Southern region | Berlin |
| Bremen: FT Geestemünde; Hamburg: FTSV Lorbeer Rothenburgsort; Lower Saxony: VfR Eintracht Wolfsburg; Schleswig-Holstein: ATSV Stockelsdorf | Middle Rhine: SSG Bergisch Gladbach; Lower Rhine: KBC Duisburg; Westphalia: TSV Siegen | Rhineland: TuS Ahrbach; Saarland: VfR 09 Saarbrücken; Southwest: TuS Wörrstadt | Baden FC Spöck; Bavaria Bayern Munich; Hesse: FSV Frankfurt; South Baden: TuS Binzen; Württemberg: TSV Ludwigsburg | Berlin: Tennis Borussia Berlin |

== First round ==
| TSV Ludwigsburg | 2 – 0 | Tennis Borussia Berlin |
| TuS Binzen | 0 – 4 | SV Lorbeer Rothenburgsort |
| FT Geestemünde | 1 – 4 | TuS Ahrbach |
| FC Spöck | 1 – 4 | Bayern Munich |
| FSV Frankfurt | 2 – 0 | VfR 09 Saarbrücken |
| TuS Wörrstadt | 1 – 3 | TSV Siegen |
| SSG Bergisch Gladbach | 1 – 0 | VfR Eintracht Wolfsburg |
| ATSV Stockelsdorf | 0 – 8 | KBC Duisburg |

== Quarter-finals ==
| TuS Ahrbach | 3 – 0 | SV Lorbeer Rothenburgsort |
| FSV Frankfurt | 3 – 0 | Bayern Munich |
| TSV Siegen | 2 – 0 | TSV Ludwigsburg |
| KBC Duisburg | 0 – 0 | SSG Bergisch Gladbach | (aet) |

=== Replay ===
| SSG Bergisch Gladbach | 3 – 3 | KBC Duisburg | (aet, 6–5 on penalties) |

== Semi-finals ==
| SSG Bergisch Gladbach | 1 – 3 | TSV Siegen |
| FSV Frankfurt | 4 – 0 | TuS Ahrbach |

== Final ==
24 June 1990

| TSV Siegen | 5 – 1 | FSV Frankfurt |
|---|---|---|
| Neid 10' 18'; Kern 36' 44'; Voss 46' | | Unsleber 52' (pen.) |

Olympic Stadium (Berlin)
Attendance: 10,000
Referee: Kriegelstein (Berlin)

TSV SIEGEN:
GK | 1 | (Germany) Rosemarie Neuser
DF | (Germany) Manuela Kozany
DF | (Germany) Karin Sänger
DF | (Germany) Sissy Raith
MF | (Germany) Andrea Haberlaß
MF | (Germany) Silvia Neid
MF | (Germany) Martina Voss
MF | (Germany) Rike Koekkoek
FW | (Germany) Beate Henkel
FW | (Hungary) Edit Kern | (substituted off) 70'
FW | (Germany) Myriam Knieper | (substituted off) 63'
Substitutes:
(Germany) Schäfer | (substituted on) 70'
Heike Czyganowski | (substituted on) 63'
Manager:
(Germany) Gerhard Neuser

FSV FRANKFURT:
GK | 1 | (Germany) Katja Kraus
DF | (Germany) Andrea Heinrich
DF | Oldendorf | (substituted off) 33'
DF | (Germany) Marion Lissner
DF | (Germany) Britta Unsleber
MF | (Germany) Gaby König
MF | Weisel | (substituted off) 47'
MF | (Germany) Carmen Birkenbach
MF | (Germany) Dagmar Pohlmann
FW | (Germany) Daniela Stumpf
FW | (Germany) Gaby Mink
Substitutes:
MF | (Germany) Katja Bornschein | (substituted on) 33'
FW | (Germany) Martina Walter | (substituted on) 47'
Manager:
(Germany) Monika Koch-Emsermann

== See also ==
- 1988–89 DFB-Pokal men's competition
