= 1984–85 DFB-Pokal Frauen =

Tournament details
- Country: Germany
- Teams: 16

Final positions
- Champions: FSV Frankfurt
- Runners-up: KBC Duisburg

Tournament statistics
- Matches played: 15
- Goals scored: 62 (4.13 per match)

The Frauen DFB-Pokal 1984–85 was the 5th season of the cup competition, Germany's second-most important title in women's football. In the final which was held in Berlin on 26 May 1985 FSV Frankfurt defeated KBC Duisburg 4–3 on penalties. The game had previously ended 1–1 after extra time. FSV Frankfurt thus won their first national title.

== Participants ==
| Northern region | Western region | Southwestern region | Southern region | Berlin |
| Bremen: Bremer TS Neustadt; Hamburg: FTSV Lorbeer Rothenburgsort; Lower Saxony: VfL Wittekind Wildeshausen; Schleswig-Holstein: ATSV Stockelsdorf | Middle Rhine: Rot-Weiß Berrendorf; Lower Rhine: KBC Duisburg; Westphalia: Schalke 04 | Rhineland: SC 07 Bad Neuenahr; Saarland: SV Weiskirchen; Southwest: 1. FC Kaiserslautern | Baden Klinge Seckach; Bavaria Bayern Munich; Hesse: FSV Frankfurt; South Baden: SC Freiburg; Württemberg: VfL Schorndorf | Berlin: Tennis Borussia Berlin |

== First round ==
| Bremer TS Neustadt | 1 – 2 | FTSV Lorbeer Rothenburgsort |
| VfL Wittekind Wildeshausen | 4 – 0 | Tennis Borussia Berlin |
| Schalke 04 | 0 – 1 | KBC Duisburg |
| Rot-Weiß Berrendorf | 4 – 2 | ATSV Stockelsdorf |
| SC 07 Bad Neuenahr | 3 – 1 | 1. FC Kaiserslautern | (aet) |
| SV Weiskirchen | 2 – 4 | Bayern Munich |
| FSV Frankfurt | 2 – 0 | SC Freiburg |
| Klinge Seckach | 8 – 1 | VfL Schorndorf |

== Quarter-finals ==
| SC 07 Bad Neuenahr | 2 – 3 | Bayern Munich |
| FSV Frankfurt | 2 – 0 | Klinge Seckach |
| FTSV Lorbeer Rothenburgsort | 0 – 3 | VfL Wittekind Wildeshausen |
| KBC Duisburg | 2 – 0 | Rot-Weiß Berrendorf |

== Semi-finals ==
| FSV Frankfurt | 2 – 1 | VfL Wittekind Wildeshausen |
| KBC Duisburg | 2 – 1 | Bayern Munich |

== Final ==
For the first time the cup final was held in Berlin prior to the DFB-Pokal final of the men's competition. The cup final has since been held twenty-five consecutive times in Berlin and will only in 2010 be moved to Cologne.

26 May 1985

| FSV Frankfurt | 1 – 1 aet | KBC Duisburg |
|---|---|---|
| Koekkoek 25' | | Offermann 52' |
Penalties
| Hamza (penalty scored) Mantel (penalty scored); Raith (penalty scored) Unsleber (penalty scored) | 4 – 3 | Thulke (penalty scored) Reichler (penalty scored); Frey (penalty scored); Offermann (penalty missed) Sager (penalty missed) |

Olympic Stadium (Berlin)
Attendance: 25,000
Referee: Udo Horeis (Buchholz)

FSV FRANKFURT 1899:
GK | 1 | (Germany) Petra Melka
DF | (Germany) Petra Kurth | (substituted off) 41'
DF | (Germany) Ingrid Zimmermann
DF | (Germany) Marion Lissner
DF | (Germany) Marion Pfeifer
MF | (Germany) Sonja Strauch
MF | (Germany) Rike Koekkoek
MF | (Germany) Sonja Hamza
FW | (Germany) Sissy Raith
FW | (Germany) Bettina Mantel
FW | (Germany) Marion Laufer | (substituted off) 61'
Substitutes:
(Germany) Britta Unsleber | (substituted on) 41'
(Germany) Scheler | (substituted on) 61'
Manager:
(Germany) Monika Koch-Emsermann

KASSLERFELDER BALLSPORTCLUB DUISBURG 1888:
GK | 1 | (Germany) Claudia Reichler
DF | Rita de Koning
DF | (Germany) Daniela Frey
DF | (Germany) Jutta Dieckmann
DF | (Germany) Monika Hohmann
MF | (Germany) Elke Thulke
MF | (Germany) Andrea Limper
MF | (Germany) Martina Schiffer | (substituted off) 71'
FW | (Germany) Martina Voss
FW | (Germany) Birgit Offermann
FW | (Germany) Cornelia Pohl | (substituted off) 53'
Substitutes:
(Germany) Sager | (substituted on) 71'
(Germany) Heike Patzel | (substituted on) 53'
Manager:
(Germany) Jürgen Krust

== See also ==
- 1984–85 DFB-Pokal men's competition
