= 1983–84 DFB-Pokal Frauen =

Tournament details
- Country: Germany
- Teams: 16

Final positions
- Champions: SSG Bergisch Gladbach
- Runners-up: VfR Eintracht Wolfsburg

Tournament statistics
- Matches played: 15
- Goals scored: 82 (5.47 per match)

The Frauen DFB-Pokal 1983–84 was the 4th season of the cup competition, Germany's second-most important title in women's football. In the final which was held in Frankfurt on 31 May 1984 SSG Bergisch Gladbach defeated VfR Eintracht Wolfsburg 2–0, thus claiming their third cup title.

== Participants ==
Northern region	Western region	Southwestern region	Southern region	Berlin
Bremen: Bremer TS Neustadt; Hamburg: FSV Harburg; Lower Saxony: VfR Eintracht Wolfsburg; Schleswig-Holstein: ATSV Stockelsdorf	Middle Rhine: SSG Bergisch Gladbach; Lower Rhine: KBC Duisburg; Westphalia: TSV Siegen	Rhineland: SC 07 Bad Neuenahr; Saarland: VfR 09 Saarbrücken; Southwest: 1. FC Kaiserslautern	Baden Klinge Seckach; Bavaria; 1. FC Schweinfurt 05; Hesse: FSV Frankfurt; South Baden: VfB Unzhurst; Württemberg: VfL Schorndorf	Berlin: BFC Meteor 06

== First round ==
TSV Siegen	0 – 5	SSG Bergisch Gladbach
SC 07 Bad Neuenahr	5 – 3	VfB Unzhorst
1. FC Kaiserslautern	4 – 0	VfR 09 Saarbrücken
BFC Meteor 05	1 – 4	FSV Harburg
KBC Duisburg	16 – 1	Bremer TS Neustadt
VfR Eintracht Wolfsburg	4 – 2	ATSV Stockelsdorf
VfL Schorndorf	4 – 1	Klinge Seckach
1. FC Schweinfurt 05	0 – 8	FSV Frankfurt

== Quarter-finals ==
FSV Harburg	0 – 6	VfR Eintracht Wolfsburg
SSG Bergisch Gladbach	1 – 0	KBC Duisburg
VfL Schorndorf	2 – 3	FSV Frankfurt
SC 07 Bad Neuenahr	4 – 1	1. FC Kaiserslautern

== Semi-finals ==
SC 07 Bad Neuenahr	1 – 2	VfR Eintracht Wolfsburg
SSG Bergisch Gladbach	2 – 0	FSV Frankfurt

== Final ==
31 May 1984

SSG Bergisch Gladbach	2 – 0	VfR Eintracht Wolfsburg
Bartelmann 28'; Dlugi-Winterberg 78'

Waldstadion (Frankfurt)
Attendance: 50,000
Referee: Manfred Neuner (Leimen)

SSG 09 BERGISCH GLADBACH:
GK	1	(Germany) Rosemarie Neuser
DF	(Germany) Erika Neuenfeldt
DF	(Germany) Gaby Dlugi-Winterberg
DF	(Germany) Monika Degwitz	Booked
DF	(Germany) Adele Corica	(substituted off) 60'
MF	(Germany) Gisela Dahl
MF	(Germany) Bettina Krug
MF	(Germany) Brigitte Klinz	(substituted off) 42'
MF	(Czechoslovakia) Mila Schauerova
FW	(Germany) Doris Kresimon
FW	(Germany) Petra Bartelmann
Substitutes:
(Germany) Ingrid Gebauer	(substituted on) 60'
(Germany) Silvia Neid	(substituted on) 42'
Manager:
(Germany) Anne Trabant-Haarbach

VFR EINTRACHT WOLFSBURG:
GK	1	Glück
DF	(Germany) Christel Klinzmann
DF	Mustroph
DF	(Germany) Maike-Katrin Knopf
DF	Vornkahl
MF	Quischinski
MF	(Germany) Dagmar Penk
MF	(Germany) Petra Damm
MF	Lange
FW	(Germany) Inge Schrader
FW	Wiggers	(substituted off) 34'
Substitutes:
Ulrich	(substituted on) 34'
Manager:
(Germany) Blume

== See also ==
- 1983–84 DFB-Pokal men's competition
