= 1982–83 DFB-Pokal Frauen =

Tournament details
- Country: Germany
- Teams: 16

Final positions
- Champions: KBC Duisburg
- Runners-up: FSV Frankfurt

Tournament statistics
- Matches played: 15
- Goals scored: 75 (5 per match)

The Frauen DFB-Pokal 1982–83 was the 3rd season of the cup competition, Germany's second-most important title in women's football. In the final which was held in Frankfurt on 8 May 1983 KBC Duisburg defeated FSV Frankfurt 3–0, thus claiming their first national title.

== Participants ==
Northern region	Western region	Southwestern region	Southern region	Berlin
Bremen: Bremer TS Neustadt; Hamburg: FSV Harburg; Lower Saxony: VfL Wittekind Wildeshausen; Schleswig-Holstein: Rendsburger TSV	Middle Rhine: SSG Bergisch Gladbach; Lower Rhine: KBC Duisburg; Westphalia: Schalke 04	Rhineland: SC 07 Bad Neuenahr; Saarland: Viktoria 09 Neunkirchen; Southwest: TuS Wörrstadt	Baden Klinge Seckach; Bavaria Bayern Munich; Hesse: FSV Frankfurt; South Baden: TuS Binzen; Württemberg: SV Oberteuringen	Berlin: Tennis Borussia Berlin

== First round ==
Bayern Munich	12 – 1	SV Oberteuringen
Klinge Seckach	5 – 0	TuS Binzen
Bremer TS Neustadt	2 – 7	VfL Wittekind Wildeshausen
Rendsburger TSV	3 – 4	FSV Harburg	(aet)
Schalke 04	0 – 5	KBC Duisburg
Tennis Borussia Berlin	3 – 1	SSG Bergisch Gladbach
FSV Frankfurt	2 – 0	Viktoria 09 Neunkirchen
TuS Wörrstadt	1 – 4	SC 07 Bad Neuenahr

== Quarter-finals ==
FSV Harburg	2 – 4	VfL Wittekind Wildeshausen	(aet)
KBC Duisburg	5 – 2	Tennis Borussia Berlin
FSV Frankfurt	1 – 0	SC 07 Bad Neuenahr
Bayern Munich	2 – 3	Klinge Seckach

== Semi-finals ==
VfL Wittekind Wildeshausen	0 – 1	KBC Duisburg
FSV Frankfurt	3 – 0	Klinge Seckach

== Final ==
8 May 1983

FSV Frankfurt	0 – 3	KBC Duisburg
		Offermann 33' 54'; Carastergiou 68' (pen.)

Stadion am Bornheimer Hang (Frankfurt)
Attendance: 1,200
Referee: Jürgen Messmer (Mannheim)

FSV FRANKFURT 1899:
GK	1	(Germany) Petra Melka
DF	(Germany) Marion Pfeifer
DF	(Germany) Susanne Jahn
DF	(Germany) Regina Senkler	(substituted off) 50'
DF	Hildenbrand
MF	(Germany) Marion Lissner
MF	(Germany) Rike Koekkoek
MF	(Germany) Sonja Strauch
FW	(Germany) Bettina Mantel
FW	(Germany) Marion Laufer	(substituted off) 50'
FW	(Germany) Sonja Hamza
Substitutes:
Scheler	(substituted on) 50'
(Germany) Elke Metz	(substituted on) 50'
Manager:
(Germany) Monika Koch-Emsermann

KASSLERFELDER BALLSPORTCLUB DUISBURG 1888:
GK	1	Dykstra
DF		(Germany) Elke Thulke
DF		Rita de Koning
DF		Halfmann
DF		(Germany) Daniela Frey
MF		(Germany) Hildegard Frauenrath
MF		(Germany) Jutta Dieckmann
MF		Kethi Carastergiou
FW		(Germany) Martina Voss
FW		(Germany) Birgit Offermann
FW		Ingrid Schuh
Substitutes:
no substitutes used
Manager:
(Germany) Gregor Grillemeier sen.

== See also ==
- 1982–83 DFB-Pokal men's competition
