= 1981–82 DFB-Pokal Frauen =

Tournament details
- Country: Germany
- Teams: 16

Final positions
- Champions: SSG Bergisch Gladbach
- Runners-up: VfL Wittekind Wildeshausen

Tournament statistics
- Matches played: 16
- Goals scored: 55 (3.44 per match)

The Frauen DFB-Pokal 1981–82 was the second season of the cup competition, Germany's second-most important title in women's football. In the final which was held in Frankfurt on 1 May 1982 SSG Bergisch Gladbach defeated VfL Wittekind Wildeshausen 3–0, thus claiming their second cup title.

== Participants ==
Northern region	Western region	Southwestern region	Southern region	Berlin
Bremen: TSV Farge-Rekum; Hamburg: FTSV Lorbeer Rothenburgsort; Lower Saxony: VfL Wittekind Wildeshausen; Schleswig-Holstein: Rendsburger TSV	Middle Rhine: SSG Bergisch Gladbach; Lower Rhine: KBC Duisburg; Westphalia: TSV Siegen	Rhineland: SC 07 Bad Neuenahr; Saarland: SV Weiskirchen; Southwest: TuS Niederkirchen	Baden Germania Untergrombach; Bavaria TSV Bäumenheim; Hesse: FSV Frankfurt; South Baden: SC Freiburg; Württemberg: VfL Schorndorf	Berlin: BFC Meteor 06

== First round ==
Rendsburger TSV	2 – 1	TSV Farge-Rekum
FSV Frankfurt	5 – 0	SC Freiburg
VfL Schorndorf	2 – 1	TSV Bäumenheim
VfL Wittekind Wildeshausen	3 – 0	BFC Meteor 06
FTSV Lorbeer Rothenburgsort	1 – 4	SSG Bergisch Gladbach
TSV Siegen	0 – 1	KBC Duisburg	(aet)
TuS Niederkirchen	0 – 2	SC 07 Bad Neuenahr
SV Weiskirchen	1 – 1	Germania Untergrombach	(aet)

=== Replay ===
Germania Untergrombach	0 – 3	SV Weiskirchen

== Quarter-finals ==
Rendsburger TSV	0 – 4	VfL Wittekind Wildeshausen
FSV Frankfurt	3 – 0	VfL Schorndorf
SC 07 Bad Neuenahr	6 – 0	SV Weiskirchen
SSG Bergisch Gladbach	2 – 0	KBC Duisburg

== Semi-finals ==
SSG Bergisch Gladbach	9 – 0	FSV Frankfurt
SC 07 Bad Neuenahr	0 – 2	VfL Wittekind Wildeshausen

== Final ==
1 May 1982

SSG Bergisch Gladbach	3 – 0	VfL Wittekind Wildeshausen
Dahl 9'; Trabant-Haarbach 44'; Krug 59'

Waldstadion (Frankfurt)
Attendance: 30,000
Referee: Norbert Brückner (Darmstadt)

SSG 09 BERGISCH GLADBACH:
GK	1	(Germany) Bärbel Domhoff
DF	(Germany) Loni Winkel
DF	(Germany) Brigitte Klinz
DF	(Germany) Monika Degwitz
DF	(Germany) Gaby Dlugi-Winterberg
MF	(Germany) Bettina Krug
MF	(Germany) Gisela Dahl	(substituted off) 36'
MF	(Germany) Anne Trabant-Haarbach
FW	(Germany) Hildegard Frauenrath
FW	(Germany) Doris Kresimon
FW	(Germany) Ingrid Gebauer	(substituted off) 55'
Substitutes:
Petra Landers	(substituted on) 36'
(Germany) Manuela Kozany	(substituted on) 55'
Manager:
(Germany) Anne Trabant-Haarbach

VFL WITTEKIND WILDESHAUSEN:
GK	1	Gabriele Zimmermann
DF	M. Vaske
DF	Susanne Bowe
DF	Sabine Peters
DF	Hella Eckhoff
MF	Eva Schute
MF	Hedwig Stukenberg
MF	Monika Wehsling
FW	Hedwig Vaske	(substituted off) 59'
FW	Maria Stukenberg
FW	Maus	(substituted off) 66'
Substitutes:
Bettina Holzhütter	(substituted on) 59'
Maas	(substituted on) 66'
Manager:
Arnold Thomalia

== See also ==
- 1981–82 DFB-Pokal men's competition
