= 1990–91 Frauen-Bundesliga =

Frauen-Bundesliga
- Season: 1990–91
- Champions: TSV Siegen; 1st Bundesliga title 3rd German title
- Relegated: SC 07 Bad Neuenahr; TuS Binzen; 1. FC Neukölln; SV Wilhelmshaven
- Top goalscorer: (Germany) Heidi Mohr (36)

The 1990–91 Frauen-Bundesliga was the first season of the Frauen-Bundesliga, the premier women's association football league in Germany after the previous seventeen years saw the league be competed in a single-elimination tournament. Twenty teams competed in two separate groups of ten with the top two teams from each group qualifying through to the final.

In the final, it was TSV Siegen who claimed the first Frauen-Bundesliga as they defeated FSV Frankfurt 4–2 in the final.

== Northern conference ==
=== Final standings ===
| Pos | Team | Pld | W | D | L | GF | GA | GD | Pts | Qualification or relegation |
|---|---|---|---|---|---|---|---|---|---|---|
| 1 | TSV Siegen | 18 | 15 | 3 | 0 | 85 | 7 | +78 | 33 | Participant of the Semi-final |
| 2 | KBC Duisburg | 18 | 10 | 7 | 1 | 47 | 16 | +31 | 27 | Participant of the Semi-final |
| 3 | SSG 09 Bergisch Gladbach | 18 | 11 | 4 | 3 | 43 | 22 | +21 | 26 | |
| 4 | Schmalfelder SV | 18 | 9 | 3 | 6 | 35 | 22 | +13 | 21 | |
| 5 | VfB Rheine | 18 | 8 | 3 | 7 | 29 | 34 | −5 | 19 | |
| 6 | VfR Eintracht Wolfsburg | 18 | 7 | 4 | 7 | 43 | 34 | +9 | 18 | |
| 7 | Fortuna Sachsenroß Hannover | 18 | 5 | 5 | 8 | 26 | 38 | −12 | 15 | |
| 8 | SC Poppenbüttel | 18 | 3 | 5 | 10 | 25 | 35 | −10 | 11 | |
| 9 | SV Wilhelmshaven | 18 | 4 | 2 | 12 | 25 | 56 | −31 | 10 | Relegated to Regional-/Oberliga |
| 10 | 1. FC Neukölln | 18 | 0 | 0 | 18 | 8 | 102 | −94 | 0 | Relegated to Regional-/Oberliga |

=== Results ===
| Home \ Away | SIE | KBC | BGL | SFE | RHE | EWO | FSH | POP | WIH | NKO |
|---|---|---|---|---|---|---|---|---|---|---|
| TSV Siegen | | 0–0 | 4–0 | 3–1 | 6–0 | 6–0 | 6–2 | 5–1 | 5–0 | 10–0 |
| KBC Duisburg | 1–1 | | 1–2 | 1–1 | 7–1 | 5–2 | 0–0 | 1–1 | 3–1 | 4–0 |
| SSG 09 Bergisch Gladbach | 0–2 | 2–2 | | 1–0 | 0–2 | 2–2 | 4–0 | 2–1 | 2–1 | 6–0 |
| Schmalfelder SV | 0–4 | 1–2 | 1–1 | | 1–0 | 2–3 | 4–0 | 2–1 | 2–0 | 7–0 |
| VfB Rheine | 0–5 | 0–1 | 1–3 | 4–0 | | 2–0 | 0–1 | 1–1 | 2–0 | 1–0 |
| VfR Eintracht Wolfsburg | 0–0 | 1–3 | 1–2 | 1–2 | 1–2 | | 3–1 | 1–1 | 3–0 | 8–0 |
| Fortuna Sachsenroß Hannover | 1–5 | 1–1 | 2–2 | 0–2 | 3–3 | 2–4 | | 1–0 | 3–0 | 4–0 |
| SC Poppenbüttel | 1–8 | 0–2 | 0–2 | 0–0 | 1–2 | 0–2 | 1–1 | | 1–2 | 7–2 |
| SV Wilhelmshaven | 0–5 | 2–4 | 2–6 | 0–5 | 3–3 | 3–3 | 2–1 | 1–6 | | 6–1 |
| 1. FC Neukölln | 0–10 | 0–9 | 0–6 | 1–4 | 1–5 | 1–8 | 1–3 | 0–2 | 1–2 | |

Legend: Blue = home team win; Yellow = draw; Red = away team win.

== Southern conference ==
=== Final standings ===
| Pos | Team | Pld | W | D | L | GF | GA | GD | Pts | Qualification or relegation |
|---|---|---|---|---|---|---|---|---|---|---|
| 1 | FSV Frankfurt | 18 | 11 | 6 | 1 | 51 | 15 | +36 | 28 | Participant of the Semifinal |
| 2 | TuS Niederkirchen | 18 | 12 | 2 | 4 | 65 | 21 | +44 | 26 | Participant of the Semifinal |
| 3 | VfR 09 Saarbrücken | 18 | 9 | 7 | 2 | 44 | 19 | +25 | 25 | |
| 4 | FC Bayern Munich | 18 | 7 | 6 | 5 | 22 | 14 | +8 | 20 | |
| 5 | SG Praunheim | 18 | 7 | 6 | 5 | 24 | 32 | −8 | 20 | |
| 6 | SC Klinge Seckach | 18 | 5 | 8 | 5 | 20 | 26 | −6 | 18 | |
| 7 | VfL Sindelfingen | 18 | 6 | 5 | 7 | 27 | 30 | −3 | 17 | |
| 8 | VfL Ulm/Neu-Ulm | 18 | 4 | 3 | 11 | 15 | 40 | −25 | 11 | |
| 9 | SC 07 Bad Neuenahr | 18 | 3 | 2 | 13 | 13 | 52 | −39 | 8 | Relegated to Regional-/Oberliga |
| 10 | TuS Binzen | 18 | 2 | 3 | 13 | 14 | 46 | −32 | 7 | Relegated to Regional-/Oberliga |

=== Results ===
| Home \ Away | FSV | NIE | SAR | FCB | SGP | KLS | SIN | UNU | NEU | BIN |
|---|---|---|---|---|---|---|---|---|---|---|
| FSV Frankfurt | | 1–1 | 2–2 | 1–0 | 3–3 | 1–1 | 5–2 | 2–1 | 5–0 | 5–0 |
| TuS Niederkirchen | 1–5 | | 6–1 | 4–2 | 0–1 | 7–1 | 5–1 | 2–1 | 7–1 | 4–0 |
| VfR 09 Saarbrücken | 0–2 | 1–1 | | 1–1 | 2–1 | 1–0 | 2–2 | 7–0 | 6–0 | 4–0 |
| FC Bayern Munich | 1–0 | 0–3 | 1–1 | | 0–0 | 5–0 | 1–0 | 0–0 | 2–0 | 2–0 |
| SG Praunheim | 0–6 | 1–8 | 0–3 | 1–0 | | 1–1 | 4–0 | 2–1 | 3–1 | 1–1 |
| SC Klinge Seckach | 1–1 | 0–2 | 0–0 | 0–0 | 2–0 | | 0–1 | 2–1 | 2–1 | 1–1 |
| VfL Sindelfingen | 1–2 | 3–2 | 1–1 | 1–1 | 1–1 | 2–2 | | 0–1 | 1–0 | 0–3 |
| VfL Ulm/Neu-Ulm | 0–4 | 0–7 | 0–4 | 2–0 | 0–1 | 0–0 | 0–3 | | 6–1 | 0–0 |
| SC 07 Bad Neuenahr | 0–0 | 2–1 | 0–5 | 0–3 | 1–1 | 1–3 | 0–5 | 1–2 | | 2–0 |
| TuS Binzen | 1–6 | 0–4 | 2–3 | 0–2 | 2–3 | 1–4 | 0–3 | 3–0 | 0–2 | |

Legend: Blue = home team win; Yellow = draw; Red = away team win.

== Semi-finals ==
| Match | | 1st leg | 2nd leg | Agg. |
|---|---|---|---|---|
| TSV Siegen | TuS Niederkirchen | 2–0 | 2–3 | 4–3 |
| FSV Frankfurt | KBC Duisburg | 3–2 | 5–0 | 8–2 |

== Final ==
| TSV Siegen | FSV Frankfurt |
16 June 1991; Siegen; Spectators: 4,500; Referee: Hans-Joachim Osmers (Bremen)
| Marion Isbert – Birgit Wiese – Sänger, Jutta Nardenbach – Marjan Veldhuizen, Loes Camper (Mink 70), Silvia Neid, Silvia Raith (Heike Czyganowski 66), Knieper – Martina Voss, Kern | Katja Kraus – Andrea Heinrich – Kerstin Pohlmann, Dagmar Pohlmann – Daniela Stumpf, Sandra Minnert (Schlösser 53), Britta Unsleber, Gaby König, Mantel – Walter (Steffi Jones-Fields 70), Katja Bornschein |
| 1–1 Kern (11); 2–1 Neid (20); 3–1 Kern (33); 4–1 Voss (34) | 0–1 Unsleber (4) 4–2 Walter (61) |

== Top scorers ==
| | Player | Team | Goals |
|---|---|---|---|
| 1 | (Germany) Heidi Mohr | TuS Niederkirchen | 36 |

== Qualification ==
=== Group North ===
| Pos | Team | Pld | W | D | L | GF | GA | GD | Pts | Qualification |
|---|---|---|---|---|---|---|---|---|---|---|
| 1 | Grün-Weiß Brauweiler | 6 | 4 | 1 | 1 | 14 | 8 | +6 | 9 | Qualified for the Bundesliga 1991–92 |
| 2 | Tennis Borussia Berlin | 6 | 2 | 1 | 3 | 7 | 8 | −1 | 5 | Qualified for the Bundesliga 1991–92 |
| 3 | STV Lövenich | 6 | 1 | 3 | 2 | 6 | 7 | −1 | 5 | |
| 4 | TV Jahn Delmenhorst | 6 | 1 | 3 | 2 | 7 | 11 | −4 | 5 | |

=== Group South 1 ===
| Pos | Team | Pld | W | D | L | GF | GA | GD | Pts | Qualification |
|---|---|---|---|---|---|---|---|---|---|---|
| 1 | TuS Ahrbach | 6 | 6 | 0 | 0 | 27 | 2 | +25 | 12 | Qualified for the Bundesliga 1991–92 |
| 2 | TSV Münchhausen | 6 | 4 | 0 | 2 | 11 | 6 | +5 | 8 | |
| 3 | FFC Wacker München | 6 | 2 | 0 | 4 | 7 | 10 | −3 | 4 | |
| 4 | Oster Oberkirchen | 6 | 0 | 0 | 6 | 0 | 27 | −27 | 0 | |

=== Group South 2 ===
| Pos | Team | Pld | W | D | L | GF | GA | GD | Pts | Qualification |
|---|---|---|---|---|---|---|---|---|---|---|
| 1 | TSV Ludwigsburg | 4 | 3 | 0 | 1 | 15 | 5 | +10 | 6 | Qualified for the Bundesliga 1991–92 |
| 2 | DFC Spöck | 4 | 3 | 0 | 1 | 12 | 3 | +9 | 6 | |
| 3 | SC Siegelbach | 4 | 0 | 0 | 4 | 3 | 22 | −19 | 0 | |
