= 1. FC Neukölln =

German football club

- Full name: 1. Fußball-Club Neukölln 1895 e. V.
- Founded: 15 June 1895
- Ground: Innplatz
- Capacity: 2,500
- Head Coach: Abbas Barjawi
- League: Landesliga Berlin 1 (VII)
- 2015–16: 8th
- Website: http://www.1fc-neukoelln.de/
Home colours	Away colours

1. FC Neukölln is a German association football club from the city of Berlin. The club's men's team's greatest success has been the four seasons spent in the tier one Oberliga Berlin-Brandenburg in the late 1920s as well as promotion to the tier two Regionalliga Berlin, where it played from 1965 to 1974.

The club's women's team, now defunct, was a founding member of the Women's Bundesliga, where it played for one season in 1990–91.

== History ==
Formed in 1895 the club first played at the highest level of football in Berlin from 1926 to 1930 in what was then the Oberliga Berlin-Brandenburg.

In post-Second World War football, the club played as SG Rixdorf in one of the four regional divisions of what was to become the tier one Oberliga Berlin. It dropped to the second level in 1946 and to the third in 1949, each time because of reductions in league strength, but also adopted its old name, 1. FC Neukölln again in 1949.

1. FC Neukölln was promoted to the tier two Amateurliga Berlin in 1953, where it played for four seasons before being relegated again in 1958. It made a return to the Amateurliga in 1963, to a league that had now slipped to third tier because of the introduction of the Bundesliga.

The team won the Amateurliga Berlin in 1967 and earned promotion to the Regionalliga Berlin, the second tier of the league system below the Bundesliga in West Berlin. Neukölln played the next seven seasons in the league, generally achieving lower table finishes. The club's best result came in 1968–69 when it finished sixth but a seventh place in 1973–74, after which the league was disbanded, meant the team did not qualify for the new 2. Bundesliga.

The club dropped back to the Amateurliga, now renamed to Oberliga Berlin, where it played for two more seasons before being relegated to the fourth tier Landesliga Berlin. It dropped out of this level as well but made a return from 1979 to 1987 without ever coming close to promotion to Berlin's highest league again.

In post-German reunion football Neukölln briefly rose to the highest level in Berlin, now the Verbandsliga Berlin, in 1999 but was relegated again after just two seasons.

Since then the club has fluctuated between the Landesliga and the Kreisliga A, playing in the former again since 2015.

The club made headlines when, in a game against the third team of German-Jewish club TuS Makkabi Berlin, 1. FC Neukölln players had threatened to knife Makkabi players; verbal attacks that were seen as connected to the Palestinian Intifada as 1. FC Neukölln has a strong Muslim membership.

=== Women's department ===
The club's women's team, now defunct, was a founding member of the Women's Bundesliga, where it played for one season in 1990–91. The team came last in the northern division of the league, losing all 18 season games and scoring just eight goals while conceding 102.

The team also made three appearances in the Women's DFB-Pokal, in 1989–90, 1991–92 and 1992–93, advancing to the third round in 1992–93 as its best result.

== Honours ==
The club's honours:

- Amateurliga Berlin
  - Champions: 1966–65
- Bezirksliga Berlin
  - Runners-up: 2014–15
- Kreisliga A Berlin
  - Runners-up: 2013–14
- Berliner Landespokal
  - Runners-up: 1925

== Recent seasons ==
The recent season-by-season performance of the club:

Season	Division	Tier	Position
2003–04	Landesliga Berlin Group 2	VI	13th
2004–05	Landesliga Berlin Group 2	VI	8th
2005–06	Landesliga Berlin Group 2	VI	13th
2006–07	Landesliga Berlin Group 1	VI	10th
2007–08	Landesliga Berlin Group 2	VI	16th ↓
2008–09	Bezirksliga Berlin Group 2	VIII	16th ↓
2009–10	Kreisliga A Berlin Group 4	IX	7th
2010–11	Kreisliga A Berlin Group 3	IX	2nd ↑
2011–12	Bezirksliga Berlin Group 3	VIII	10th
2012–13	Bezirksliga Berlin Group 2	VIII	16th ↓
2013–14	Kreisliga A Berlin Group 1	IX	1st ↑
2014–15	Bezirksliga Berlin Group 1	VIII	1st ↑
2015–16	Landesliga Berlin Group 1	VII	8th
2016–17	Landesliga Berlin Group 1	VII	

- With the introduction of the Regionalligas in 1994 and the 3. Liga in 2008 as the new third tier, below the 2. Bundesliga, all leagues below dropped one tier.

↑ Promoted	↓ Relegated
