= FC Schalke 04 (women) =

Schalke 04
- Founded: 1975; 51 years ago July 2020; 6 years ago (refoundation)
- Ground: Glückauf-Kampfbahn, Gelsenkirchen
- Capacity: 11,000
- CEO: Matthias Tillmann
- Head coach: Stefan Colmsee
- League: Regionalliga West
- 2025–26: Westfalenliga, 1st (promoted)
Home colours	Away colours	Third colours

FC Schalke 04 is a German women's association football team based in Gelsenkirchen, North Rhine-Westphalia.

== History ==
=== DJK Eintracht Erle ===
In 1974, a women's football department was founded in Gelsenkirchen-Erle, four years after the ban on women's football was lifted. Early regulations differed from men's football, with shorter playing times and modified equipment. DJK Eintracht Erle reached the final of the first official German Women's Championship but lost to TuS Wörrstadt.

=== 1975–1987: The first era ===
Former Schalke 04 president Günter Siebert sought to establish a women's division, influenced by the success of DJK Eintracht Erle and Schalke's involvement in the Bundesliga scandal. Facing financial struggles, Eintracht Erle agreed to join Schalke, with a friendly match generating funds for Erle. In 1975, Schalke 04 officially established its women's football division after integrating DJK Eintracht Erle. The team began competing in the Bezirksliga, the highest league at the time, with limited resources but growing recognition.

Schalke 04's women's team made pioneering strides in Westphalian football, winning the Westfalenmeisterschaft five times (1977, 1980, 1981, 1984, 1985) but never advancing past the German Championship quarterfinals or the first round of the DFB-Pokal in their both participations in 1982–83 and 1984–85.

In 1987, Schalke 04 dissolved its women's team due to financial struggles worsened by the men's team's relegations to the 2. Bundesliga, which forced president Günter Siebert to implement drastic measures, including shutting down the women's division.

=== 2020s: Re-establishment ===
Following a brief cooperation with 1. FFC Recklinghausen from 2007 to 2010, Schalke 04 formed a women's football team in July 2020, focusing on grassroots and amateur sports. The club began by adding a team to the Kreisliga B and gradually built a youth division. Glückauf-Kampfbahn became the home venue for the women's team since their reestablishment.

In the 2020–21 season, the team finished first before the season was cut short due to the COVID-19 pandemic. In 2021–22, Schalke became champions and earned promotion to the Landesliga, and in the following season, the team advanced to the Westfalenliga. In the 2024–25 season, Schalke finished in second place behind their rivals, Borussia Dortmund, which meant they remained in the same division, as only one club could be promoted. In April 2026, they secured promotion to the Regionalliga West, finishing top of their division.

== Squad ==
As of 20 November 2025

Note: Flags indicate national team as defined under FIFA eligibility rules; some limited exceptions apply. Players may hold more than one non-FIFA nationality.

No.	Pos.	Nation	Player
1	GK	GER	Julia Matuszek
2	MF	GER	Nathalie Bollmann
3	DF	TUR	Meltem Karadağ
4	MF	GER	Pauline Dallmann
5	DF	GER	Lilly Stojan
6	DF	GER	Pia Rybacki
7	FW	GER	Celina Jürgens
8	MF	GER	Pia Beyer
9	FW	GER	Mandy Islacker
10	FW	GER	Laura Radke
11	FW	GER	Jolina Opladen
13	DF	GER	Maja Hünnemeyer
14	MF	GER	Jule Dallmann

No.	Pos.	Nation	Player
15	MF	GER	Chaleen Klöß
17	MF	GER	Joana Merten
16	DF	GER	Antonia Heilker
17	MF	GER	Joana Merten
18	MF	GER	Demi Pagel
19	DF	GER	Nele Schmidt
20	FW	GER	Alessandra Vogel
21	MF	CRO	Dana Salic
22	MF	GER	Lea Wilting
23	MF	GER	Carolin Mai
24	DF	GER	Shari Noffke (captain)
26	DF	GER	Holly Pels
29	FW	GER	Lucy Karwatzki

== Former Players ==
- (Malta) Jana Barbara

== Current staff ==
As of 24 March 2025

Coaching staff
(Germany) Stefan Colmsee	Head coach
(Germany) Marcel Freienstein	Assistant coach
(Germany) Christoph Heselmann	Goalkeeping coach
(Germany) Tobias Kirsch	Athletic trainer
(Germany) Silvia Hufnagel (Germany) Kathrin Kortmann (Germany) Benjamin van Osch	Medical team and physiotherapists
(Germany) Christina Rühl-Hamers	Head of Finance, Human Resources and Legal department
