= Doris Fitschen =

German footballer (1968–2025)

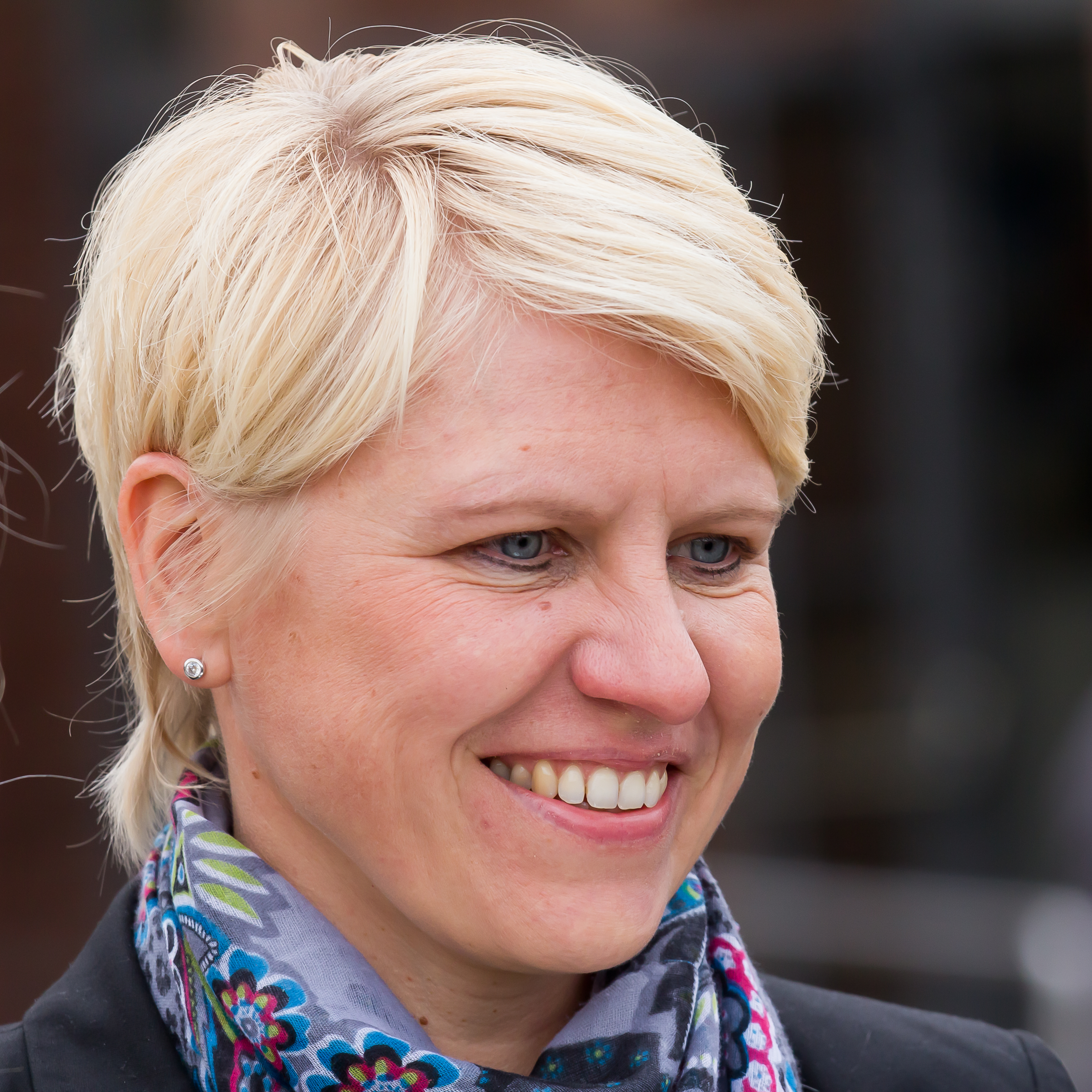
- Fitschen in 2012

Personal information
- Date of birth: 25 October 1968
- Place of birth: Zeven, West Germany
- Date of death: 15 March 2025 (aged 56)
- Height: 1.75 m (5 ft 9 in)
- Position: Sweeper

Youth career
- 1978–1982: FC Hesedorf
- 1982–1988: TuS Westerholz

Senior career*
| Years | Team | Apps | (Gls) |
| 1988–1992 | VfR Eintracht Wolfsburg | | |
| 1992–1996 | TSV Siegen | | |
| 1996–2001 | 1.FFC Frankfurt | | |
| 2001 | Philadelphia Charge | 13 | (3) |

International career
| 1986–2001 | Germany | 144 | (16) |
Medal record
Women's football
Representing Germany
Olympic Games
| Bronze medal – third place | 2000 Sydney | Team |
European Championship
| Winner | 1989 Germany |
| Winner | 1991 Denmark |
| Winner | 1995 Germany |
| Winner | 1997 Norway/Sweden |
| Winner | 2001 Germany |
- * Club domestic league appearances and goals

Doris Fitschen (25 October 1968 – 15 March 2025) was a German footballer who played as a midfielder.

Together with Martina Voss and Silvia Neid, she is considered the most successful German women's footballer, having won seven national titles and six DFB trophies. Fitschen competed for Germany at the 1996 and 2000 Summer Olympics.

== Club career ==
Fitschen was born in Zeven. She signed for the Women's United Soccer Association (WUSA) ahead of the inaugural season in 2001. She was allocated to Philadelphia Charge and scored the team's first ever goal in a 2–0 win at San Diego Spirit on 22 April 2001. Despite missing the final part of the season with a career-ending wrist injury, Fitschen was named WUSA Defensive Player of the Year.

== International career ==
Fitschen's senior debut for the West Germany national team came on 4 October 1986; in a 2–0 win over Denmark. She scored her first international goal in the same game after entering play as a substitute.

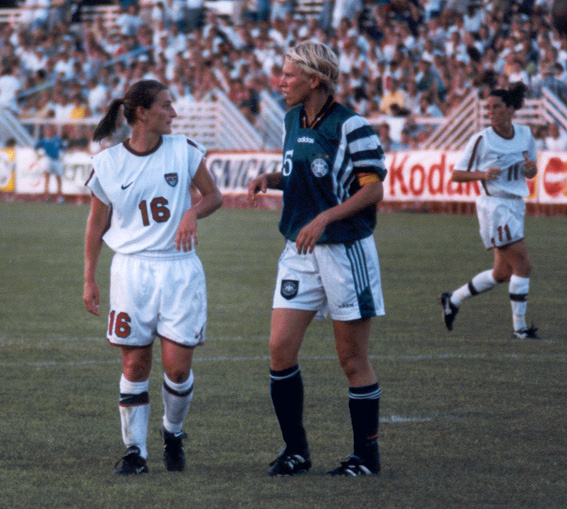
Fitschen (5) marking Tiffeny Milbrett (16) of the United States in 1998

At the 1989 European Competition for Women's Football, Fitschen was an important part of the team who claimed West Germany's first major trophy. UEFA named her the tournament's Golden Player.

Following her retirement Fitschen received a special achievement award from UEFA, for her outstanding contribution to women's football.

== Personal life and death ==
Fitschen lived together with her partner and had with her one child.

On 16 March 2025, Fitschen died after a long and serious illness. She was 56.

== Career statistics ==
Scores and results list West Germany's goal tally first, score column indicates score after each Fitschen goal.

List of international goals scored by Doris Fitschen
| No. | Date | Venue | Opponent | Score | Result | Competition |
|---|---|---|---|---|---|---|
| 1 | 7 October 1987 | Budapest, Hungary | Hungary | 1–0 | 1–0 | 1989 European Competition for Women's Football qualifying |
| 2 | 15 November 1987 | Burghausen, Germany | Italy | 1–0 | 3–0 | 1989 European Competition for Women's Football qualifying |
| 3 | 15 November 1987 | Burghausen, Germany | Italy | 3–0 | 3–0 | 1989 European Competition for Women's Football qualifying |
| 4 | 30 October 1988 | Passau, Germany | Hungary | 4–0 | 4–0 | 1989 European Competition for Women's Football qualifying |
| 5 | 11 April 1996 | Unterhaching, Germany | Slovakia | 2–0 | 2–0 | UEFA Women's Euro 1997 qualifying |
| 6 | 23 September 1999 | Fürth, Germany | Ukraine | 3–0 | 3–0 | UEFA Women's Euro 2001 qualifying |
| 7 | 11 November 1999 | Isernia, Italy | Italy | 1–0 | 4–4 | UEFA Women's Euro 2001 qualifying |

== Honours ==
TSV Siegen

- Bundesliga: 1993–94, 1995–96
- DFB-Pokal: 1992–93

1. FFC Frankfurt

- Bundesliga: 1998–99, 2000–01
- DFB-Pokal: 1998–99, 1999–2000, 2000–01
- DFB-Hallenpokal: 1997, 1998, 1999

Germany

- UEFA Women's Championship: 1989, 1991, 1995, 1997, 2001
- Football at the Summer Olympics: Bronze medal 2000

Individual

- UEFA Women's Championship: Golden Player 1989
- FIFA Women's World Cup: All-Star Team 1999
