= 1993–94 Frauen-Bundesliga =

Frauen-Bundesliga
- Season: 1993–94
- Champions: TSV Siegen; 3rd Bundesliga title 5th German title
- Relegated: SC 07 Bad Neuenahr; TSV Battenberg; SSG 09 Bergisch Gladbach; KBC Duisburg
- Top goalscorer: (Germany) Heidi Mohr (28)

The 1993–94 Frauen-Bundesliga was the fourth season of the Frauen-Bundesliga, Germany's premier football league. The top two clubs of northern division met in the final with TSV Siegen defeating Grün-Weiß Brauweiler 1–0. Both clubs had already met in the cup final five weeks earlier, but then Brauweiler had prevailed. The championship was Siegen's fifth.

== Northern conference ==
=== Standings ===
Pos	Team	Pld	W	D	L	GF	GA	GD	Pts	Qualification or relegation
1	TSV Siegen	18	15	2	1	74	11	+63	32	Participant of the semifinal
2	Grün-Weiß Brauweiler	18	14	3	1	66	9	+57	31	Participant of the semifinal
3	Tennis Borussia Berlin	18	7	6	5	28	21	+7	20	
4	VfB Rheine	18	7	5	6	31	20	+11	19	
5	Fortuna Sachsenroß Hannover	18	8	3	7	38	37	+1	19	
6	VfR Eintracht Wolfsburg	18	7	4	7	36	40	−4	18	
7	Schmalfelder SV (Note: Promoted from the Regionalliga last season)	18	5	5	8	21	24	−3	15	
8	FC Rumeln-Kaldenhausen	18	4	5	9	24	43	−19	13	
9	SSG 09 Bergisch Gladbach	18	3	2	13	10	45	−35	8	Relegated to Regional-/Oberliga
10	KBC Duisburg	18	2	1	15	8	86	−78	5	Relegated to Regional-/Oberliga

Source: RSSSF

=== Results ===
Home \ Away	SIE	GWB	TBB	RHE	FSH	EWO	SCH	RUK	BGL	KBC
TSV Siegen		2–2	4–1	2–4	3–0	2–0	2–0	4–0	6–0	13–0
Grün-Weiß Brauweiler	1–1		5–0	1–1	6–0	3–0	2–0	6–0	4–0	5–0
Tennis Borussia Berlin	0–1	0–3		0–0	0–0	5–0	0–0	5–1	0–0	4–1
VfB Rheine	0–1	2–0	1–2		1–1	1–1	0–2	2–2	4–0	2–0
Fortuna Sachsenroß Hannover	0–5	0–3	0–2	0–2		3–2	3–2	3–3	1–0	10–1
VfR Eintracht Wolfsburg	1–8	1–4	2–1	3–2	2–4		1–1	5–1	1–1	10–0
Schmalfelder SV	0–3	1–2	1–1	2–0	1–3	1–2		1–2	2–1	1–1
FC Rumeln-Kaldenhausen	1–5	1–2	1–1	0–1	4–2	2–2	1–1		1–0	1–2
SSG Bergisch Gladbach	1–6	0–6	0–4	3–1	0–2	1–2	0–3	1–0		2–0
KBC Duisburg	0–6	0–11	1–2	0–7	0–6	0–1	0–2	0–3	2–0	

Source: Global Sports Archive
Legend: Blue = home team win; Yellow = draw; Red = away team win.

== Southern conference ==
=== Standings ===
Pos	Team	Pld	W	D	L	GF	GA	GD	Pts	Qualification or relegation
1	TuS Niederkirchen (Note: 1992–93 Bundesliga (women) champion)	18	14	2	2	71	24	+47	30	Participant of the semifinal
2	FSV Frankfurt	18	13	3	2	66	20	+46	29	Participant of the semifinal
3	SG Praunheim	18	13	2	3	55	13	+42	28	
4	VfR 09 Saarbrücken	18	10	4	4	52	28	+24	24	
5	SC Klinge Seckach	18	7	4	7	28	32	−4	18	
6	TuS Ahrbach	18	7	3	8	36	34	+2	17	
7	VfL Sindelfingen	18	6	1	11	22	41	−19	13	
8	TuS Wörrstadt (Note: Promoted from the Regionalliga last season)	18	3	2	13	15	61	−46	8	
9	SC 07 Bad Neuenahr	18	2	3	13	23	51	−28	7	Relegated to Regional-/Oberliga
10	TSV Battenberg	18	2	2	14	18	82	−64	6	Relegated to Regional-/Oberliga

Source: RSSSF

=== Results ===
Home \ Away	NIE	FSV	SGP	SAR	KLS	AHR	SIN	WÖR	NEU	BAT
TuS Niederkirchen		5–4	0–3	3–3	1–0	3–2	5–1	9–0	2–0	9–0
FSV Frankfurt	3–0		4–0	2–0	3–0	3–0	5–1	7–0	2–2	3–1
SG Praunheim	0–1	1–1		3–1	2–0	4–1	3–1	4–0	6–0	8–0
VfR 09 Saarbrücken	1–4	4–1	1–2		3–0	3–2	3–1	7–1	4–1	6–3
SC Klinge Seckach	2–2	2–7	0–4	1–1		1–0	1–0	4–1	5–2	1–1
TuS Ahrbach	2–6	1–1	1–1	1–1	3–1		1–2	4–1	1–0	5–0
VfL Sindelfingen	0–3	0–3	2–1	0–5	0–1	1–5		2–1	1–1	2–0
TuS Wörrstadt	1–4	0–3	0–1	1–5	0–0	3–4	1–0		1–1	1–0
SC 07 Bad Neuenahr	0–2	1–5	0–5	0–2	1–3	1–2	1–5	6–2		4–0
TSV Battenberg	2–12	2–9	0–7	2–2	1–6	2–1	1–3	0–3	3–2	

Source: Global Sports Archive
Legend: Blue = home team win; Yellow = draw; Red = away team win.

== Semi-finals ==
Match		1st leg	2nd leg	Agg.
TSV Siegen	FSV Frankfurt	3–0	1–1	4–1
TuS Niederkirchen	Grün-Weiß Brauweiler	1–5	0–4	1–9

== Final ==
TSV Siegen	Grün-Weiß Brauweiler
19 June 1994; Pulheim; Spectators: 2,600; Referee: Silke Janssen (Emden)
Silke Rottenberg – Doris Fitschen – Jutta Nardenbach, Meike Fitzner – Cornelia Trauschke, Andrea Euteneuer, Silvia Neid, Britta Unsleber (Loes Camper 86) – Martina Voss, Michaela Kubat, Gaby Mink (Christine Chaladyniak 84)	Manuela Goller – Claudia Klein – Andrea Klein, Natascha Schwind – Sandra Hengst (Reimann 86), Tünde Nagy, Anja Koser, Gyöngyi Lovász-Anton, Bettina Wiegmann – Menge, Gudrun Gottschlich
1–0 Kubat (65)	

== Top scorers ==
	Player	Team	Goals
1	(Germany) Heidi Mohr	TuS Niederkirchen	28

== Qualification ==
=== Group North ===
Pos	Team	Pld	W	D	L	GF	GA	GD	Pts	Qualification
1	Turbine Potsdam	6	5	0	1	18	8	+10	10	Qualified for the Bundesliga 1994–95
2	Wattenscheid 09	6	3	1	2	10	8	+2	7	Qualified for the Bundesliga 1994–95
3	TV Jahn Delmenhorst	6	1	2	3	6	12	−6	4	
4	VfL Wittekind Wildeshausen	6	1	1	4	5	11	−6	3	

Source: RSSSF

=== Group South 1 ===
Pos	Team	Pld	W	D	L	GF	GA	GD	Pts	Qualification
1	FFC Wacker München	6	5	1	0	26	1	+25	11	Qualified for the Bundesliga 1994–95
2	SC Freiburg	6	4	1	1	19	2	+17	9	
3	FSV Viktoria Jägersburg	6	2	0	4	8	9	−1	4	
4	TuS Koblenz	6	0	0	6	1	42	−41	0	

Source: RSSSF

=== Group South 2 ===
Pos	Team	Pld	W	D	L	GF	GA	GD	Pts	Qualification
1	FSV Schwarzbach	6	5	0	1	21	10	+11	10	Qualified for the Bundesliga 1994–95
2	TSV Crailsheim	6	4	0	2	34	8	+26	8	
3	SG Kirchardt	6	3	0	3	10	16	−6	6	
4	Rot-Weiß Göcklingen	6	0	0	6	5	36	−31	0	

Source: RSSSF
