= 1992–93 DFB-Pokal Frauen =

Tournament details
- Country: Germany
- Teams: 47

Final positions
- Champions: TSV Siegen
- Runners-up: Grün-Weiß Brauweiler

Tournament statistics
- Matches played: 46

The Frauen DFB-Pokal 1992–93 was the 13th season of the cup competition, Germany's second-most important title in women's football. In the final, held in Berlin on 12 June 1993, TSV Siegen defeated Grün-Weiß Brauweiler 6–5 on penalties; the game had ended 1–1 after extra time. It was Siegen's fifth cup title.

== First round ==
Several clubs had byes in the first round. Those clubs were automatically qualified for the 2nd round of the cup.

SV Lorbeer Rothenburgsort	4 – 0	STV Lövenich
BSV Müssen	0 – 1	VfB Rheine
Wittenseer SV	0 – 8	Grün-Weiß Brauweiler
SC Poppenbüttel	0 – 5	KBC Duisburg
Schmalfelder SV	3 – 1	TV Jahn Delmenhorst
Fortuna Magdeburg	0 – 3	Tennis Borussia Berlin
Turbine Potsdam	0 – 7	VfR Eintracht Wolfsburg
SV Wolfenbüttel	0 – 6	Fortuna Sachsenroß Hannover
FSV Viktoria Jägersburg	0 – 1	TuS Ahrbach
SG Kirchardt	1 – 15	TuS Niederkirchen
SC Siegelbach	1 – 5	VfR 09 Saarbrücken
SpVgg Landshut	0 – 10	VfL Sindelfingen
SpVgg Hausen	0 – 2	SG Praunheim
FC Grün-Weiß Erfurt	2 – 3	TSV Ludwigsburg
TSV Crailsheim	1 – 0	Klinge Seckach

== Second round ==
VfR Eintracht Wolfsburg	2 – 1	SSG Bergisch Gladbach
KBC Duisburg	7 – 0	DJK Preußen Borghorst
VfB Rheine	9 – 0	SV Lorbeer Rothenburgsort
GSV Moers	0 – 8	Grün-Weiß Brauweiler
TSV Siegen	15 – 1	Hansa Rostock
1. FC Neukölln Berlin	1 – 0	Polizei SV Bremen
Fortuna Sachsenroß Hannover	8 – 1	Uni SV Jena
Tennis Borussia Berlin	1 – 0	Schmalfelder SV	(aet)
TSV Crailsheim	0 – 6	TuS Niederkirchen
FV Faurndau	0 – 1	SV Flörsheim
TSV Ludwigsburg	2 – 1	SpVgg Wiehre
SC 07 Bad Neuenahr	1 – 2	SG Praunheim
Bayern Munich	0 – 6	TuS Ahrbach
VfL Sindelfingen	11 – 0	FC Wismut Aue
VfR 09 Saarbrücken	3 – 0	TSV Münchhausen
LTA Dresden	0 – 2	FSV Frankfurt

== Third round ==
TuS Niederkirchen	1 – 1	TuS Ahrbach	(aet, 4–3 on penalties)
VfR Eintracht Wolfsburg	2 – 1	Tennis Borussia Berlin
1. FC Neukölln	0 – 3	SG Praunheim
VfB Rheine	0 – 0	VfL Sindelfingen	(aet, 4–3 on penalties)
Grün-Weiß Brauweiler	3 – 0	FSV Frankfurt
TSV Siegen	3 – 0	TSV Ludwigsburg
Fortuna Sachsenroß Hannover	1 – 3	VfR 09 Saarbrücken
KBC Duisburg	1 – 0	SV Flörsheim	(aet)

== Quarter-finals ==
SG Praunheim	0 – 1	TSV Siegen
TuS Niederkirchen	0 – 1	VfB Rheine
VfR 09 Saarbrücken	2 – 4	Grün-Weiß Brauweiler
VfR Eintracht Wolfsburg	1 – 1	KBC Duisburg	(aet, 5–4 on penalties)

== Semi-finals ==
VfB Rheine	1 – 4	Grün-Weiß Brauweiler
TSV Siegen	6 – 0	VfR Eintracht Wolfsburg

== Final ==
12 June 1993

TSV Siegen	1 – 1 aet	Grün-Weiß Brauweiler
Fitschen 38'		Wiegman 42'
Penalties
Euteneuer (penalty scored) Fitschen (penalty scored); Unsleber (penalty scored); Kubat (penalty scored); Camper (penalty scored) Czyganowski (penalty scored)	6 – 5	Nagy (penalty scored) A. Klein (penalty scored); Staubitz (penalty scored); Lovász-Anton (penalty scored); Wiegmann (penalty scored) Agócs (penalty missed)

Olympic Stadium (Berlin)
Attendance: 10,000
Referee: Christine Frai (Bremen)

TSV SIEGEN:
GK	1	(Germany) Silke Rottenberg
DF		(Germany) Andrea Euteneuer
DF		(Germany) Meike Fitzner		(substituted off) 60'
DF		(Germany) Jutta Nardenbach
DF		(Netherlands) Loes Camper
MF		(Germany) Britta Unsleber
MF		(Germany) Silvia Neid
MF		(Germany) Doris Fitschen	Booked
MF		(Germany) Heike Czyganowski
FW		(Germany) Michaela Kubat
FW		(Germany) Gaby Mink		(substituted off) 57'
Substitutes:
DF		(Netherlands) Marjan Veldhuizen		(substituted on) 60'
FW		(Germany) Monika Meyer		(substituted on) 57'
Manager:
(Germany) Gerhard Neuser

GRÜN-WEISS BRAUWEILER:
GK	1	(Germany) Manuela Goller	Booked
MF		(Hungary) Gyöngyi Lovász-Anton
DF		(Germany) Andrea Klein
DF		(Germany) Natascha Schwind	Booked
MF		(Germany) Anouschka Bernhard
MF		(Hungary) Tünde Nagy	Booked
MF		(Germany) Claudia Klein		(substituted off) 90'
MF		(Germany) Bettina Wiegmann
FW		(Germany) Dunja Staubitz
FW		(Hungary) Annamária Agócs
FW		(United States) Megan Hanushek		(substituted off) 70'
Substitutes:
MF		(Hungary) Katalin Fodor		(substituted on) 90'
FW		(Germany) Nicole Schön		(substituted on) 70'
Manager:
(Germany) Thomas Meyer

== See also ==
- Bundesliga 1992–93
- 1992–93 DFB-Pokal men's competition
