= Megan Hanushek =

American soccer player

Personal information
- Date of birth: May 17, 1970 (age 56)
- Place of birth: Colorado Springs, Colorado, United States
- Position: Midfielder

College career
Years	Team	Apps	(Gls)
1988–1991	Rochester Yellowjackets		

Megan Hanushek is a former American soccer player who played for Grün-Weiß Brauweiler. After leaving Germany Megan Hanushek played for the Rochester Ravens.

== Post career ==
After retiring from professional soccer, Hanushek set up her own shop called Soccer Shack.

== Honours ==
Grün-Weiß Brauweiler

- German Cup: 1993–94
- Frauen-Bundesliga: 1994–95
