= List of Germany women's international footballers =

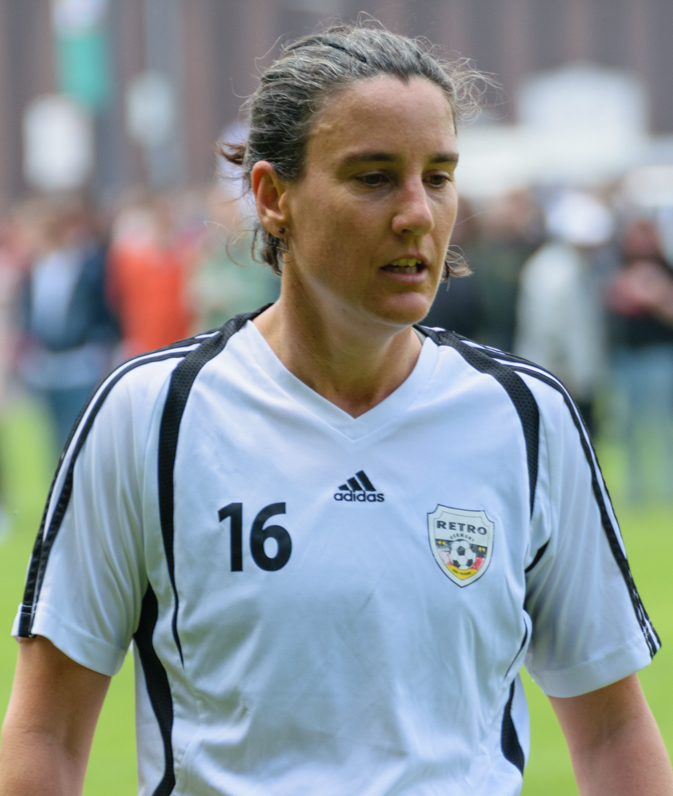
Birgit Prinz holds the record for appearances and goals for Germany, having scored 128 goals in 214 caps from 1994 to 2011.

The Germany women's national football team represents Germany in international women's football. The team is fielded by the German Football Association (DFB), the governing body of football in Germany, and competes as a member of the Union of European Football Associations (UEFA). Germany competed in their first international match on 10 November 1982, a 5–1 win in a friendly against Switzerland. In total, 235 players have appeared for the national team since its inception.

Germany have competed in numerous friendly and competitive competitions, and all players who have played in a match, either as a member of the starting eleven or as a substitute, are listed below. Each player's details include her playing position while with the team, the number of caps earned and goals scored in all international matches, and details of the first and most recent matches played in. The players in the list are ordered alphabetically using their most common name. All statistics are correct up to and including the match played on 24 June 2022 against Switzerland.

== Key ==
Positions key
GK	Goalkeeper
DF	Defender
MF	Midfielder
FW	Forward

Player
This color background and the * symbol indicate that the player was active at club and/or international level at the date specified above.
The name that each player is most commonly known by is listed, which may differ from her legal name or surname used during or after her playing career. Players are noted if they have used a different maiden or married name during their life.
Position
Playing positions are listed according to the player's primary position while playing for the national team.
Caps and goals
Caps and goals comprise those in official competitions, along with international friendly tournaments and matches.

== Players ==
Germany women's national football team players
Player	Pos.	Caps	Goals	Debut		Last or most recent match		Ref.
Player	Pos.	Caps	Goals	Date	Opponent	Date	Opponent	Ref.
Sandra Alter	GK	2	0	28 August 1991	Switzerland	25 September 1991	Hungary	
Fatmire Alushi (Note: Née Bajramaj)	MF	79	18	20 October 2005	Scotland	11 March 2015	Sweden	
Nadine Angerer	GK	146	0	27 August 1996	Netherlands	4 July 2015	England	
Nicole Anyomi *	FW	8	0	21 February 2021	Belgium	24 June 2022	Switzerland	
Birgitt Austermühl	DF	58	2	25 September 1991	Hungary	25 July 1996	Brazil	
Isabell Bachor	MF	30	3	6 March 2001	China	6 March 2009	China	
Nicole Banecki *	MF	5	0	7 March 2008	Finland	11 March 2009	Denmark	
Petra Bartelmann	FW	25	4	10 November 1982	Switzerland	29 April 1990	Czechoslovakia	
Saskia Bartusiak	DF	101	3	12 April 2007	Netherlands	19 August 2016	Sweden	
Vanessa Baudzus	DF	1	0	5 February 1998	Italy	5 February 1998	Italy	
Katharina Baunach	DF	2	0	4 March 2009	Finland	6 March 2009	China	
Inken Becher (Note: Married name was previously Beeken)	DF	13	0	28 May 1997	Norway	1 September 2005	Canada	
Stefanie Becker	DF	3	0	9 September 2001	United States	17 November 2001	Netherlands	
Melanie Behringer	MF	123	34	28 January 2005	Australia	19 August 2016	Sweden	
Laura Benkarth *	GK	11	0	26 November 2015	England	15 June 2021	Chile	
Bettina Berens	MF	1	0	18 April 1992	Italy	18 April 1992	Italy	
Ann-Katrin Berger *	GK	3	0	1 December 2020	Republic of Ireland	20 February 2022	Canada	
Anouschka Bernhard	DF	47	1	30 June 1991	China	23 March 1997	China	
Roswitha Bindl	DF	22	3	30 October 1988	Hungary	29 November 1991	Sweden	
Anna Blässe *	DF	27	0	6 March 2015	China	7 April 2018	Czech Republic	
Birgit Bormann	FW	8	2	10 November 1982	Switzerland	22 October 1983	Belgium	
Katja Bornschein	FW	37	2	30 June 1991	China	20 March 1997	China	
Jule Brand *	MF	16	5	10 April 2021	Australia	24 June 2022	Switzerland	
Nicole Brandebusemeyer	MF	8	0	5 February 1998	Italy	19 September 2000	Sweden	
Pauline Bremer *	FW	21	4	10 April 2014	Slovenia	7 March 2020	Norway	
Linda Bresonik	MF	84	8	10 May 2001	Italy	5 April 2013	United States	
Maria Breuer	GK	1	0	7 September 1983	Switzerland	7 September 1983	Switzerland	
Patricia Brocker (Note: Née Grigoli)	FW	46	30	18 April 1992	Italy	25 July 1996	Brazil	
Susanne Brück (Note: Née Messner)	MF	3	0	16 December 1990	England	11 October 1992	Russia	
Klara Bühl *	FW	24	12	28 February 2019	France	24 June 2022	Switzerland	
Brigitte Butscher	GK	1	0	27 July 1986	Iceland	27 July 1986	Iceland	
Britta Carlson	MF	31	4	4 March 2004	China	12 March 2007	Denmark	
Selina Cerci *	FW	2	0	17 February 2022	Spain	23 February 2022	England	
Christine Chaladyniak	MF	2	0	15 April 1986	Hungary	30 June 1996	Iceland	
Jennifer Cramer *	MF	23	0	11 March 2013	Norway	20 June 2015	Sweden	
Sara Däbritz *	MF	86	17	29 June 2013	Japan	24 June 2022	Switzerland	
Linda Dallmann *	MF	45	12	16 September 2016	Russia	24 June 2022	Switzerland	
Petra Damm	MF	46	2	21 November 1984	Netherlands	29 November 1991	Sweden	
Karin Danner	MF	1	0	2 May 1984	Norway	2 May 1984	Norway	
Kristin Demann *	DF	20	1	22 October 2015	Russia	1 September 2018	Iceland	
Monika Denker (Note: Née Boll)	MF	7	0	2 June 1994	Croatia	23 March 1997	China	
Helene Dietrich	DF	1	0	22 October 1983	Belgium	22 October 1983	Belgium	
Gaby Dlugi-Winterberg (Note: Née Winterberg)	DF	8	0	10 November 1982	Switzerland	22 October 1983	Belgium	
Cornelia Doll	DF	4	0	24 September 1983	Denmark	23 August 1984	Belgium	
Fabienne Dongus *	MF	4	0	10 April 2021	Australia	23 February 2022	England	
Sara Doorsoun *	DF	36	1	3 March 2016	France	20 February 2022	Canada	
Rosi Eichenlaub	FW	12	4	19 March 1983	Netherlands	5 October 1985	Finland	
Johanna Elsig *	DF	15	1	9 April 2017	Canada	7 March 2020	Norway	
Heidi Engel	MF	1	0	20 July 1988	Italy	20 July 1988	Italy	
Nicole Erhardt	DF	1	0	5 May 1993	Switzerland	5 May 1993	Switzerland	
Angelika Fehrmann	MF	9	1	20 July 1988	Italy	2 July 1989	Norway	
Jana Feldkamp *	MF	13	0	10 April 2021	Australia	12 April 2022	Serbia	
Nicole Ferber	DF	1	0	27 August 1996	Netherlands	27 August 1996	Netherlands	
Nicole Fischer	MF	3	0	7 September 1983	Switzerland	14 May 1988	Switzerland	
Doris Fitschen	MF	144	16	4 October 1986	Denmark	7 July 2001	Sweden	
Christine Francke	GK	2	0	13 April 1995	Poland	23 May 1995	Switzerland	
Laura Freigang *	FW	13	9	7 March 2020	Norway	9 April 2022	Portugal	
Niobe Friedrich	GK	2	0	7 August 1990	Soviet Union	9 August 1990	United States B	
Merle Frohms *	GK	27	0	6 October 2018	Austria	24 June 2022	Switzerland	
Sonja Fuss	DF	68	3	27 August 1996	Netherlands	28 October 2010	Australia	
Christine Fütterer	MF	3	0	2 April 1988	Italy	28 March 1991	France	
Kerstin Garefrekes	MF	130	43	17 November 2001	Netherlands	9 July 2011	Japan	
Ingrid Gebauer (Note: Married name is Nandzik)	FW	3	2	10 November 1982	Switzerland	1 May 1983	Denmark	
Marie-Luise Gehlen	MF	4	0	22 August 1984	England	9 April 1985	Hungary	
Margarita Gidion *	MF	2	0	6 March 2015	China	8 April 2015	Brazil	
Lena Goeßling	MF	106	10	28 February 2008	China	12 June 2019	Spain	
Manuela Goller	GK	45	0	5 August 1990	England	25 July 1996	Brazil	
Jeannette Götte	MF	8	0	16 March 2000	Netherlands	25 October 2001	Portugal	
Gudrun Gottschlich	FW	33	2	10 May 1989	Denmark	2 May 1996	Norway	
Stefanie Gottschlich	MF	45	3	12 October 1997	United States	31 March 2004	Italy	
Inka Grings	FW	96	64	5 May 1996	Finland	26 October 2011	Sweden	
Astrid Gröpper	GK	1	0	27 August 1996	Netherlands	27 August 1996	Netherlands	
Sarah Günther-Werlein (Note: Née Günther)	DF	27	0	6 March 2001	China	20 October 2005	Scotland	
Giulia Gwinn *	MF	27	3	24 November 2017	France	24 June 2022	Switzerland	
Andrea Haberlaß	DF	10	1	1 May 1985	Denmark	2 July 1989	Norway	
Verena Hagedorn	MF	13	1	8 September 2001	Japan	22 May 2003	Denmark	
Chantal Hagel *	MF	3	0	20 February 2022	Canada	9 April 2022	Portugal	
Marina Hegering *	DF	20	3	6 April 2019	Sweden	24 June 2022	Switzerland	
Astrid Heidecke	GK	1	0	21 November 1984	Netherlands	21 November 1984	Netherlands	
Andrea Heinrich	DF	4	0	5 August 1990	England	11 August 1990	United States	
Kathrin Hendrich *	DF	46	5	5 March 2014	Iceland	24 June 2022	Switzerland	
Sandra Hengst	MF	7	1	14 October 1990	Hungary	28 May 1992	FR Yugoslavia	
Beate Henkel	FW	10	0	8 October 1983	Netherlands	14 May 1988	Switzerland	
Martina Hennen	DF	9	0	5 May 1993	Switzerland	27 July 1994	Canada	
Josephine Henning	DF	42	2	15 September 2010	Canada	21 July 2017	Italy	
Ariane Hingst	DF	174	10	27 August 1996	Netherlands	5 July 2011	France	
Melanie Hoffmann	MF	36	2	23 May 1995	Switzerland	28 September 2000	Brazil	
Ursula Holl	GK	5	0	9 March 2007	France	28 October 2010	Australia	
Anja Hümme	DF	3	0	19 November 1986	Netherlands	28 March 1991	France	
Svenja Huth *	MF	66	13	26 October 2011	Sweden	24 June 2022	Switzerland	
Marion Isbert (Note: Née Feiden)	GK	58	0	10 November 1982	Switzerland	29 November 1991	Sweden	
Mandy Islacker *	FW	25	5	22 October 2015	Russia	10 April 2018	Slovenia	
Regine Israel	MF	2	0	21 November 1984	Netherlands	1 May 1985	Denmark	
Susanne Jahn	MF	1	0	25 January 1984	Italy	25 January 1984	Italy	
Steffi Jones	DF	111	9	3 July 1993	Denmark	14 March 2007	Italy	
Hasret Kayikçi *	FW	11	6	20 September 2016	Hungary	10 June 2018	Canada	
Tabea Kemme	DF	47	6	27 November 2013	Croatia	4 March 2018	England	
Isabel Kerschowski *	DF	21	4	10 May 2007	Wales	30 July 2017	Denmark	
Nadine Keßler	MF	29	10	26 February 2010	Finland	19 June 2014	Canada	
Claudia Klein	DF	6	0	31 July 1994	United States	12 July 1997	Italy	
Sophia Kleinherne *	DF	16	0	9 November 2019	England	12 April 2022	Serbia	
Katrin Kliehm	MF	5	0	14 September 2002	Norway	29 January 2003	United States	
Brigitte Klinz	DF	8	0	10 November 1982	Switzerland	5 October 1985	Finland	
Christel Klinzmann	DF	21	1	10 November 1982	Switzerland	22 July 1988	United States	
Turid Knaak *	FW	16	2	10 April 2018	Slovenia	15 June 2021	Chile	
Maike-Katrin Knopf	MF	1	0	5 March 1983	Belgium	5 March 1983	Belgium	
Anne Knüpp	MF	1	0	7 September 1983	Switzerland	7 September 1983	Switzerland	
Rike Koekkoek	MF	28	2	10 November 1982	Switzerland	15 November 1987	Italy	
Gaby König-Vialkowitsch (Note: Née König)	MF	3	0	30 May 1991	United States	8 December 1993	Poland	
Annike Krahn	DF	137	5	28 January 2005	Australia	19 August 2016	Sweden	
Margret Kratz	MF	2	0	7 September 1985	Norway	5 October 1985	Finland	
Katja Kraus	GK	7	0	25 May 1995	China	23 March 1997	China	
Thekla Krause	FW	5	2	20 July 1988	Italy	26 November 1988	Czechoslovakia	
Doris Kresimon	FW	7	1	10 November 1982	Switzerland	22 October 1983	Belgium	
Anne Kreuzberg	MF	10	3	25 January 1984	Italy	1 May 1985	Denmark	
Bettina Krug	MF	3	0	10 November 1982	Switzerland	1 May 1983	Denmark	
Paulina Krumbiegel *	MF	5	2	22 September 2020	Montenegro	15 June 2021	Chile	
Michaela Kubat	FW	11	2	28 August 1991	Switzerland	5 May 1993	Switzerland	
Frauke Kuhlmann	DF	43	1	21 November 1984	Netherlands	5 September 1992	Poland	
Kim Kulig (Note: Married name is Kulig-Soyah)	MF	33	7	25 February 2009	China	5 April 2013	United States	
Nia Künzer	DF	34	2	27 May 1997	Denmark	15 November 2003	Portugal	
Petra Landers	DF	15	0	10 November 1982	Switzerland	30 May 1991	United States	
Ursula Landwehr	MF	6	1	17 September 1988	Switzerland	30 June 1991	China	
Claudia von Lanken	GK	3	0	24 April 1997	Spain	8 March 1998	England	
Melanie Lasrich	FW	5	3	9 April 1985	Hungary	24 October 1993	Switzerland	
Lena Lattwein *	MF	17	0	10 November 2018	Italy	24 June 2022	Switzerland	
Simone Laudehr	MF	103	26	29 July 2007	Denmark	24 October 2017	Faroe Islands	
Melanie Leupolz *	MF	75	13	19 June 2013	Canada	30 November 2021	Portugal	
Andrea Limper (Note: Married name is Limper-Pfeil)	DF	7	3	7 September 1985	Norway	15 November 1987	Italy	
Isabelle Linden *	MF	1	0	19 June 2013	Canada	19 June 2013	Canada	
Renate Lingor	MF	149	35	25 October 1995	Slovakia	21 August 2008	Japan	
Sydney Lohmann *	MF	12	2	10 November 2018	Italy	24 June 2022	Switzerland	
Ursula Lohn	DF	26	9	21 March 1989	Bulgaria	18 June 1995	Norway	
Lena Lotzen	FW	25	4	29 February 2012	Iceland	20 June 2015	Sweden	
Manuela Lütke	GK	1	0	22 July 1988	United States	22 July 1988	United States	
Lina Magull *	MF	60	19	22 October 2015	Russia	24 June 2022	Switzerland	
Leonie Maier *	DF	79	11	13 February 2013	France	26 October 2021	Israel	
Claudia Mandrysch	DF	2	0	20 September 1995	Finland	25 October 1995	Slovakia	
Dzsenifer Marozsán *	MF	111	33	28 October 2010	Australia	12 April 2022	Serbia	
Jennifer Meier	FW	7	0	8 September 2001	Japan	7 March 2002	Sweden	
Maren Meinert	FW	92	33	9 October 1991	Belgium	12 October 2003	Sweden	
Jacqueline Meißner (Note: Née Klasen) *	MF	3	0	20 September 2016	Hungary	7 March 2018	France	
Petra Melka	GK	2	0	2 May 1984	Norway	23 August 1984	Belgium	
Monika Meyer	FW	27	5	27 May 1997	Denmark	1 July 1999	United States	
Sylvia Michel	MF	1	0	2 August 1994	Norway	2 August 1994	Norway	
Sandra Minnert	DF	147	16	28 May 1992	FR Yugoslavia	1 November 2007	Netherlands	
Eva Minor	DF	1	0	16 May 1987	France	16 May 1987	France	
Anja Mittag	FW	158	50	31 March 2004	Italy	30 July 2017	Denmark	
Heidi Mohr	FW	104	83	19 May 1986	Norway	29 September 1996	Iceland	
Claudia Müller	FW	45	22	27 August 1996	Netherlands	7 July 2001	Sweden	
Martina Müller *	FW	101	37	22 July 2000	United States	29 November 2012	France	
Nicole Müller	MF	1	0	9 October 1997	United States	9 October 1997	United States	
Jutta Nardenbach	DF	59	4	19 November 1986	Netherlands	25 July 1996	Brazil	
Silvia Neid	FW	111	48	10 November 1982	Switzerland	25 July 1996	Brazil	
Rosemarie Neuser	GK	8	0	25 January 1984	Italy	4 September 1987	Iceland	
Sjoeke Nüsken *	MF	9	2	21 February 2021	Belgium	26 November 2021	Turkey	
Lena Oberdorf *	MF	27	3	6 April 2019	Sweden	24 June 2022	Switzerland	
Viola Odebrecht	MF	49	2	26 January 2003	Norway	13 March 2013	United States	
Birgit Offermann	FW	7	0	10 November 1982	Switzerland	1 May 1985	Denmark	
Navina Omilade (Note: Married name was previously Omilade-Keller)	MF	61	0	10 May 2001	Italy	22 May 2010	United States	
Christine Paul	DF	11	0	7 September 1985	Norway	27 November 1991	United States	
Babett Peter *	DF	118	8	9 March 2006	Finland	6 October 2018	Austria	
Lena Petermann *	FW	21	5	6 March 2015	China	7 March 2020	Norway	
Eva Pirrung	MF	1	0	15 April 1986	Hungary	15 April 1986	Hungary	
Conny Pohlers	FW	67	28	10 May 2001	Italy	21 August 2008	Japan	
Dagmar Pohlmann	DF	37	4	2 September 1992	France	25 July 1996	Brazil	
Alexandra Popp *	FW	129	64	17 February 2010	North Korea	24 July 2023	Morocco	
Birgit Prinz	FW	214	128	27 July 1994	Canada	30 June 2011	Nigeria	
Sissy Raith	DF	58	4	5 March 1983	Belgium	28 August 1991	Switzerland	
Maximiliane Rall *	DF	8	0	10 November 2018	Italy	12 April 2022	Serbia	
Tanja Rastetter	MF	6	0	2 September 1992	France	5 May 1993	Switzerland	
Felicitas Rauch *	DF	21	3	26 November 2015	England	24 June 2022	Switzerland	
Bianca Rech	DF	20	0	14 September 2002	Norway	2 August 2007	Czech Republic	
Claudia Reichler	GK	3	0	10 November 1982	Switzerland	5 October 1985	Finland	
Elke Richter	DF	27	1	7 September 1983	Switzerland	2 April 1988	Italy	
Nicole Rolser	MF	2	0	4 September 2018	Faroe Islands	6 October 2018	Austria	
Judith Roth	DF	1	0	18 April 1992	Italy	18 April 1992	Italy	
Silke Rottenberg	GK	126	0	7 April 1993	United States	29 May 2008	Wales	
Célia Šašić (Note: Née Okoyino da Mbabi)	FW	111	63	28 January 2005	Australia	4 July 2015	England	
Jana Schadrack	FW	1	0	19 May 2002	England	19 May 2002	England	
Carmen Schäfer	FW	3	0	27 May 1997	Denmark	9 October 1997	United States	
Andrea Schaller	GK	1	0	16 March 2000	Netherlands	16 March 2000	Netherlands	
Christa Schäpertöns	FW	1	0	25 January 2002	United States	25 January 2002	United States	
Susanne Scharras	DF	4	0	2 May 1984	Norway	4 September 1987	Iceland	
Miriam Scheib	FW	1	0	27 August 1996	Netherlands	27 August 1996	Netherlands	
Carina Schlüter *	GK	1	0	10 June 2018	Canada	10 June 2018	Canada	
Antonia Schmale	MF	3	0	5 February 1998	Italy	9 September 2001	United States	
Ulrike Schmetz	GK	1	0	25 October 2006	England	25 October 2006	England	
Bianca Schmidt *	DF	51	3	25 February 2009	China	22 September 2015	Croatia	
Lisa Schmitz *	GK	2	0	10 June 2018	Canada	6 October 2018	Austria	
Lea Schüller *	FW	39	25	20 October 2017	Iceland	24 June 2022	Switzerland	
Almuth Schult *	GK	64	0	15 February 2012	Turkey	29 June 2019	Sweden	
Manuela Schultealbert (Note: Née Schlamann)	DF	1	0	14 November 1992	Russia	14 November 1992	Russia	
Eva Schute	MF	4	0	2 May 1984	Norway	26 August 1984	Italy	
Verena Schweers (Note: Née Faißt)	DF	47	3	28 October 2010	Australia	22 June 2019	Nigeria	
Julia Simic	MF	2	0	22 October 2016	Austria	25 October 2016	Netherlands	
Carolin Simon *	DF	20	3	29 November 2016	Norway	29 June 2019	Sweden	
Sandra Smisek	FW	133	34	13 April 1995	Poland	1 October 2008	Switzerland	
Claudia Sonn	MF	7	3	17 September 1988	Switzerland	22 November 1989	Czechoslovakia	
Sandra Starke *	FW	6	1	8 October 2019	Greece	15 June 2021	Chile	
Kerstin Stegemann	MF	191	8	13 April 1995	Poland	30 August 2009	Iceland	
Monika Steinmetz (Note: Née Degwitz)	MF	22	0	10 November 1982	Switzerland	7 October 1987	Hungary	
Daniela Stumpf	DF	6	0	16 May 1987	France	18 April 1992	Italy	
Karolin Thomas	MF	1	0	13 March 2006	Norway	13 March 2006	Norway	
Shelley Thompson	FW	2	1	6 August 2003	Nigeria	25 September 2004	Czech Republic	
Anne Trabant-Haarbach (Note: Née Haarbach)	MF	8	0	10 November 1982	Switzerland	22 October 1983	Belgium	
Cornelia Trauschke	MF	3	0	16 May 1987	France	22 July 1988	United States	
Claudia Tschöke (Note: Née Lübbers)	MF	8	2	25 September 1994	Switzerland	18 September 1996	Iceland	
Dagmar Uebelhör	DF	11	1	22 November 1989	Czechoslovakia	28 March 1991	France	
Stephanie Ullrich	GK	4	0	28 January 2007	China	14 March 2007	Italy	
Britta Unsleber (Note: Married name is Unsleber-Piekarksi)	DF	54	13	21 November 1984	Netherlands	3 July 1993	Denmark	
Martina Voss-Tecklenburg (Note: Née Voss)	MF	125	27	3 October 1984	Finland	16 March 2000	Netherlands	
Tanja Vreden	FW	6	1	28 May 1998	New Zealand	28 March 1999	China	
Marion Wagner	GK	2	0	6 September 1987	Iceland	20 July 1988	Italy	
Elke Walther	GK	17	0	21 March 1989	Bulgaria	27 October 1994	Russia	
Kerstin Wasems	GK	1	0	26 May 1998	New Zealand	26 May 1998	New Zealand	
Tabea Waßmuth *	FW	15	5	22 September 2020	Montenegro	12 April 2022	Serbia	
Joelle Wedemeyer *	DF	1	0	10 June 2018	Canada	10 June 2018	Canada	
Bärbel Weimar	FW	5	0	11 March 1993	Sweden	22 September 1993	Sweden	
Birte Weiß	FW	2	0	9 May 1991	Poland	12 March 1993	France	
Lisa Weiß *	GK	4	0	17 February 2010	North Korea	7 March 2017	England	
Beate Wendt	MF	9	1	28 March 1991	France	29 November 1991	Sweden	
Luisa Wensing *	DF	22	1	2 March 2012	China	6 March 2015	China	
Bettina Wiegmann	MF	154	51	1 October 1989	Hungary	12 October 2003	Sweden	
Birgit Wiese	DF	5	0	17 September 1988	Switzerland	9 October 1991	Belgium	
Madleen Wilder	DF	2	0	14 June 2001	Canada	25 October 2001	Portugal	
Marion Wilmes	MF	2	0	18 April 2002	Netherlands	4 May 2002	Portugal	
Petra Wimbersky	FW	70	16	6 March 2001	China	10 March 2008	Sweden	
Pia-Sophie Wolter *	MF	1	0	1 December 2020	Republic of Ireland	1 December 2020	Republic of Ireland	
Tanja Wörle	MF	2	0	2 September 1999	Russia	14 October 1999	Iceland	
Pia Wunderlich	MF	102	21	7 December 1993	Russia	1 March 2006	China	
Tina Wunderlich	DF	34	0	25 September 1994	Switzerland	6 March 2003	China	
Christina Zerbe	DF	12	0	16 March 2000	Netherlands	6 August 2003	Nigeria	
Jennifer Zietz	MF	15	1	28 January 2005	Australia	3 March 2010	United States	
Ingrid Zimmermann	MF	11	0	2 May 1984	Norway	30 July 1986	Iceland	

== See also ==
- List of East Germany women's international footballers
- List of Germany men's international footballers
- List of East Germany international footballers
- List of Saarland international footballers
