= Elke Walther =

German footballer

Personal information
- Date of birth: 1 April 1967 (age 59)
- Height: 1.71 m (5 ft 7 in)
- Position: Goalkeeper

Senior career*
Years	Team	Apps	(Gls)
1988-1992	VfL Sindelfingen		
1992	SSG 09 Bergisch Gladbach		
1992-2003	TuS Niederkirchen		
2003-2007	SC Freiburg	4	(0)

International career^{‡}
1989-1994	Germany	17	(0)

Managerial career
- 2003-present: SC Freiburg
- * Club domestic league appearances and goals ‡ National team caps and goals as of 16 November 1991 (before the 1991 FIFA Women's World Cup)

Elke Walther (born 1 April 1967) is a German football coach and former goalkeeper for international games. She is a member of the Germany women's national football team. She was part of the 1991 FIFA Women's World Cup team. On the club level she plays for VfL Sindelfingen in Germany.

== Career ==
=== Club ===
From 1990 to 1992 season, Walther first belonged to the Bundesliga VfL Sindelfingen, before transferring to SSG 09 Bergisch Gladbach and then to TuS Niederkirchen without a point game. Since the 2003-04 season she was a member of SC Freiburg for four seasons, in which she made her debut on 30 May 2004 (19th matchday) in the 3-1 defeat at home against Hamburger SV.

She played her fourth and last Bundesliga game for the club of 6 May 2007 (18th matchday) in the 2-6 defeat in the guest game against FCR 2001 Duisburg. In the 2003-04 season she was assistant coach and since the 2006-07 season she has been the goalkeeping coach at SC Freiburg.
