= Anja Koser =

German footballer and handballer (born 1970)

Personal information
- Born: May 9, 1970 (age 56)

Sport
- Sport: Handball; Football
- Club: Bayer 04 Leverkusen (? - 1992); Grün-Weiß Brauweiler (1993-1994)

Anja Koser (born 9 May 1970) was one of the few, if not the only, women to have competed in the 1990s in two different dominant sports on first league level in Germany. Until 1992 she played team handball with the 1st league team of Bayer 04 Leverkusen. As from season 1993–94 she played football as a member of the team of Grün-Weiß Brauweiler, winning the Women's DFB Pokal 1993–94 consecutively.
