= Rike Koekkoek =

German footballer

Personal information
- Date of birth: 16 February 1960 (age 66)
- Position: Midfielder

International career
Years	Team	Apps	(Gls)
1982–1987	Germany	28	(2)

Rike Koekkoek (born 16 February 1960) is a German former footballer who played as a midfielder. She made 28 appearances for the Germany national team from 1982 to 1987.

== Career ==
=== Clubs ===
Koekkoek was a midfielder at first for FSV Frankfurt, twice reaching the final of the German championship, emerging victorious in 1986. Her team lost 3–1 to SV Bergisch Gladbach 09 on June 30, 1984, in the Frankfurt Stadion am Bornheimer Hang, but they won the championship title on June 28, 1986, in the stadium on Paffrather Strasse 5–0 against the same team they lost to two years earlier. On June 28, 1987, with TSV Siegen for the third time, she reached the final of the German championship, which was won 2–1 against their previous club.

She experienced a similar course in the DFB Cup competition. She first lost the final held on May 8, 1983, in Frankfurt am Main 0–3 against KBC Duisburg. Then on May 26, 1985, in the Berlin Olympic Stadium, she gave her team a 1–0 lead in the 25th minute, before it was equalized by Birgit Offermann's goal in the 52nd minute. With TSV Siegen she won the final three consecutive seasons beginning in 1987. She defeated STV Lövenich 5–2, FC Bayern Munich 4–0, and FSV Frankfurt 5–1.

=== National/national team ===
As a player on the select team of the Hessian Football Association, she won the final of the state cup on April 15, 1984, in Barsinghausen, with a 2–0 victory over the select team of the Middle Rhine Football Association.

Koekkoek won 28 caps for the senior team and scored two goals. She was part of the team that played the first international match of a German women's national team on November 10, 1982, in Koblenz against the Switzerland national team and won 5–1. She scored her first international goal on May 1, 1983, in the third European Championship qualifier in Group 4 in a 1–1 draw against the national team of Denmark with the opening goal in the 29th minute. She had her last cap as a national player on November 15, 1987, in a 3–0 victory over the national team of Italy in the second European Championship qualifier of group 3, which was able to finish first.

== Achievements ==
- German Champion 1986, 1987
- DFB Cup winner 1985, 1987, 1988, 1989
- National Cup winner 1984

== Miscellaneous ==
Koekkoek works in local government in Frankfurt.
