= Jutta Nardenbach =

German footballer (1968–2018)

Personal information
- Date of birth: 13 August 1968
- Place of birth: Bendorf, West Germany
- Date of death: 8 June 2018 (aged 49)
- Position: Defender

Team information
- Current team: 1. FFC Montabaur

Senior career*
Years	Team	Apps	(Gls)
–1990	TuS Ahrbach		
1990–1994	TSV Siegen		
1994–1996	TuS Ahrbach		
1996–1998	FC Rumeln-Kaldenhausen		
1998–2000	SC 07 Bad Neuenahr		
2000–2002	1. FFC Frankfurt		
2003–2004	FFC Brauweiler Pulheim		
2004–2005	SG Essen-Schönebeck		

International career^{‡}
1986–1996	Germany	59	(4)
- * Club domestic league appearances and goals ‡ National team caps and goals as of 17 July 2009

Jutta Nardenbach (13 August 1968 – 8 June 2018) was a German international footballer. She played the position of defender. Nardenbach was player in the first team and coach of the youth teams at third tier FFC Montabaur.

== Club career ==
Nardenbach played in the Bundesliga for TuS Ahrbach, TuS Niederkirchen, TSV Siegen, FC Rumeln-Kaldenhausen, SC 07 Bad Neuenahr, 1. FFC Frankfurt, and SG Essen-Schönebeck. She retired from the Bundesliga in 2004, contracting for the 2006/07 season as coach for FFC Montabaur in the Regionalliga and also played in the first team. In addition, she worked for several years for a sports shop in Ruppach-Goldhausen in club customer services.

Nardenbach had appearances in 5 German Championship finals and won in 1991, 1992, 1994 each with TSV Siegen. In 1993 she also won the DFB-Pokal with TSV Siegen. In her time at FFC Frankfurt she won back to back Doubles in 2001 and 2002. Also in 2002 she won the UEFA Women's Cup with Frankfurt.

== National team ==
Nardenbach had 59 appearances for Germany, scoring 4 times. Her first cap was against the Netherlands on 19 November 1986. Her last game was against Brazil on 25 July 1996. Her greatest successes were the European Championships in 1989 and 1991. At the FIFA World Cup in 1991 she placed 4th with Germany.

== Honours ==
- German Championship: 1991, 1992, 1994, 2001, 2002
- DFB-Pokal: 1993, 2001, 2002
- UEFA Women's Cup: 2002
- European Championship: 1989, 1991
