= BFC Meteor 06 =

German football club

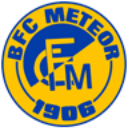
- Full name: Berliner Fußballclub Meteor 06 e.V.
- Founded: 1 June 1906; 120 years ago
- Ground: Sportplatz Ungarnstraße
- Capacity: 500
- League: Landesliga Berlin 2 (VII)
- 2024–25: Landesliga Berlin 1, 2nd of 16
| Home colours | Away colours |

BFC Meteor 06 is a German association football club from the city of Berlin. Established 1 June 1906, the team appeared intermittently in first division play in the 1920s and early 1930s and was a second tier fixture throughout the 1950s.

== History ==
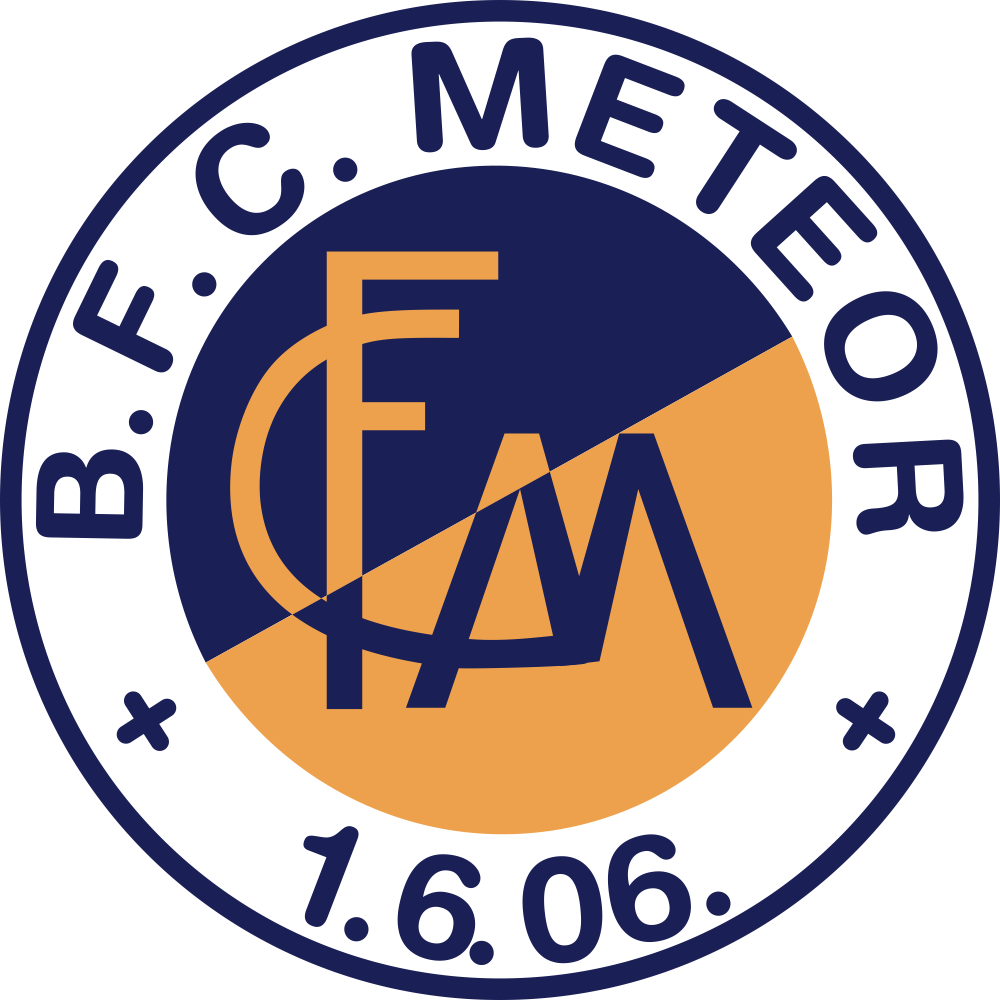
Historic logo of BFC Meteor

Berliner Fußball-Club Meteor was an undistinguished side in its early years, playing in lower tier city competition. In 1918, during World War I, the team briefly played as part of the combined wartime side Kriegsvereinigung Meteor/Roland Berlin with Roland 04 Berlin. They went on to play half a dozen seasons in the Oberliga Berlin (I) between 1922 and 1932, but were never able to place better than seventh. During World War II, the team was again partnered with another club, and spent the 1944–45 season as part of Kriegsspielgemeinschaft Meteor/NNW Berlin alongside SV Norden-Nordwest Berlin.

Following the war, occupying Allied authorities disbanded most organizations throughout the country, including sports and football associations. New clubs were soon established and the former memberships of Meteor and Reinickendorfer Fußball-Club Alt-Holland were re-organized as Sportgemeinshaft Schäfersee Berlin. Some time in 1948 the club was renamed SG Blau-Gelb Wedding before Meteor was reformed as a separate side in April 1949 with Alt-Holland following suit in 1950.

Meteor joined the Amateurliga Berlin (II) in the 1952–53 season where they competed as a middling side. They were sent down in 1960 and rejoined the Amateurliga Berlin, now a third tier circuit following the formation of the Bundesliga and Regionalliga (II), in 1963. The performance of the team improved and after a second-place result in 1968 they advanced to the Regionalliga for a two-year turn. Another second-place finish in 1971 returned Meteor to second division play for a single season. A last place finish in the Amateurliga in 1974 saw the club slip away to lower-tier competition.
