= Silvia Neid =

German football player and manager (born 1964)

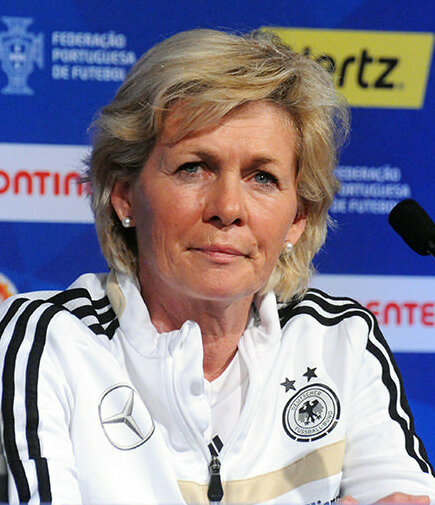
- Neid as manager of Germany in 2015

Personal information
- Full name: Silvia Edith Maria Neid
- Date of birth: 2 May 1964 (age 62)
- Place of birth: Walldürn, West Germany
- Height: 1.66 m (5 ft 5 1/2 in)
- Position: Midfielder

Youth career
- 1975–1980: SV Schlierstadt

Senior career*
| Years | Team | Apps | (Gls) |
| 1980–1983 | Klinge Seckach | | |
| 1983–1985 | SSG Bergisch Gladbach | | |
| 1985–1996 | TSV Siegen | | |

International career
| 1982–1996 | Germany | 111 | (48) |

Managerial career
- 2005–2016: Germany
- * Club domestic league appearances and goals

Silvia Edith Maria Neid (born 2 May 1964) is a German former professional football player and manager. She is one of the most successful players in German women's football, having won seven national championships and six DFB-Pokal trophies. Between 2005 and 2016, Neid served as the head coach of the Germany women's national team. She was the FIFA World Women's Coach of the Year in 2010, 2013 and 2016.

== Playing career ==
Neid's career as a player began at SV Schlierstadt, later renamed to Klinge Seckach. She stayed with the club until 1983 when she signed up with SSG Bergisch Gladbach, then the dominant team in German football. She won the double with SSG in 1984, but moved to TSV Siegen after a title-less 1985 season. The club enjoyed its most successful years during Neid's tenure, winning six championships and five cups. When Gerd Neuser stopped coaching Siegen in 1994, Neid requested a transfer to SG Praunheim, but the club refused. Neid retired after the 1996 season.

As a German international, Neid made her debut on 10 November 1982 against Switzerland. She scored two goals in the match, the first of which came just one minute after she had entered the pitch. Neid won the UEFA Women's Championship three times in succession between 1989 and 1995, and reached the final of the 1995 FIFA Women's World Cup. Her last game was at the 1996 Summer Olympics in Atlanta against Brazil.

== International goals ==
| No. | Date | Venue | Opponent | Score | Result | Competition |
|---|---|---|---|---|---|---|
| 1. | 10 November 1982 | Koblenz, Germany | Switzerland | 3–0 | 5–1 | Friendly |
| 2. | 10 November 1982 | Koblenz, Germany | Switzerland | 5–1 | 5–1 | Friendly |
| 3. | 22 October 1983 | Brussels, Belgium | Belgium | 1–0 | 1–1 | 1984 European Competition for Women's Football qualifying |
| 4. | 25 January 1984 | Italy | Italy | 1–1 | 1–2 | Friendly |
| 5. | 22 August 1984 | Jesolo, Italy | England | 1–0 | 2–0 | 1984 Mundialito |
| 6. | 22 August 1984 | Jesolo, Italy | England | 2–0 | 2–0 | 1984 Mundialito |
| 7. | 30 August 1986 | Reykjavík, Iceland | Iceland | 3–0 | 5–0 | Friendly |
| 8. | 30 August 1986 | Reykjavík, Iceland | Iceland | 4–0 | 5–0 | Friendly |
| 9. | 19 November 1986 | Nordhorn, Germany | Netherlands | 2–0 | 3–1 | Friendly |
| 10. | 1 April 1987 | Bad Neuenahr-Ahrweiler, Germany | Netherlands | 2–0 | 3–1 | Friendly |
| 11. | 16 May 1987 | Dillingen, Germany | France | 2–0 | 2–0 | Friendly |
| 12. | 6 September 1987 | Delmenhorst, Germany | Iceland | 1–0 | 3–2 | Friendly |
| 13. | 6 September 1987 | Delmenhorst, Germany | Iceland | 2–0 | 3–2 | Friendly |
| 14. | 6 September 1987 | Delmenhorst, Germany | Iceland | 3–0 | 3–2 | Friendly |
| 15. | 17 September 1988 | Binningen, Switzerland | Switzerland | 1–0 | 10–0 | 1989 European Competition for Women's Football qualifying |
| 16. | 17 December 1988 | Kaiserslautern, Germany | Czechoslovakia | 1–0 | 2–0 | 1989 European Competition for Women's Football qualifying |
| 17. | 28 June 1989 | Siegen, Germany | Italy | 1–0 | 1–1 (a.e.t.) (4–3 p) | 1989 European Competition for Women's Football |
| 18. | 22 November 1989 | Marburg, Germany | Czechoslovakia | 4–0 | 5–0 | UEFA Women's Euro 1991 qualifying |
| 19. | 7 August 1990 | Blaine, United States | Soviet Union | 1–0 | 3–0 | 1990 North American Cup |
| 20. | 9 August 1990 | Blaine, United States | United States B | ?–? | 3–2 | 1990 North American Cup |
| 21. | 26 September 1990 | Düsseldorf, Germany | Bulgaria | 2–0 | 4–0 | UEFA Women's Euro 1991 qualifying |
| 22. | 26 September 1990 | Düsseldorf, Germany | Bulgaria | 3–0 | 4–0 | UEFA Women's Euro 1991 qualifying |
| 23. | 28 March 1991 | Antony, France | France | 2–0 | 2–0 | Friendly |
| 24. | 9 May 1991 | Aue, Germany | Poland | 1–0 | 2–1 | Friendly |
| 25. | 14 July 1991 | Aalborg, Denmark | Norway | 3–1 | 3–1 (a.e.t.) | UEFA Women's Euro 1991 |
| 26. | 17 November 1991 | Jiangmen, China | Nigeria | 1–0 | 4–0 | 1991 FIFA Women's World Cup |
| 27. | 2 September 1992 | Bad Kreuznach, Germany | France | 4–0 | 7–0 | Friendly |
| 28. | 2 September 1992 | Bad Kreuznach, Germany | France | 5–0 | 7–0 | Friendly |
| 29. | 2 September 1992 | Bad Kreuznach, Germany | France | 7–0 | 7–0 | Friendly |
| 30. | 11 October 1992 | Moscow, Russia | Russia | 2–0 | 7–0 | UEFA Women's Euro 1993 qualifying |
| 31. | 7 April 1993 | Philadelphia, United States | United States | 2–1 | 2–1 | Friendly |
| 32. | 8 December 1993 | | Poland | 1–0 | 7–0 | Friendly |
| 33. | 8 December 1993 | | Poland | 3–0 | 7–0 | Friendly |
| 34. | 8 December 1993 | | Poland | 7–0 | 7–0 | Friendly |
| 35. | 31 March 1994 | Bielefeld, Germany | Wales | 5–0 | 12–0 | UEFA Women's Euro 1995 qualifying |
| 36. | 31 March 1994 | Bielefeld, Germany | Wales | 9–0 | 12–0 | UEFA Women's Euro 1995 qualifying |
| 37. | 5 May 1994 | Swansea, Wales | Wales | 1–0 | 12–0 | UEFA Women's Euro 1995 qualifying |
| 38. | 2 June 1994 | Zagreb, Croatia | Croatia | 7–0 | 7–0 | UEFA Women's Euro 1995 qualifying |
| 39. | 31 July 1994 | Fairfax, United States | United States | 1–2 | 1–2 | Friendly |
| 40. | 7 September 1994 | Germany | Sweden | 3–0 | 3–1 | Friendly |
| 41. | 21 September 1994 | Sindelfingen, Germany | Croatia | 3–0 | 8–0 | UEFA Women's Euro 1995 qualifying |
| 42. | 25 September 1994 | Weingarten, Germany | Switzerland | 11–0 | 11–0 | UEFA Women's Euro 1995 qualifying |
| 43. | 27 October 1994 | Osnabrück, Germany | Russia | 3–0 | 4–0 | UEFA Women's Euro 1995 qualifying |
| 44. | 13 April 1995 | Potsdam, Germany | Poland | 1–0 | 8–0 | Friendly |
| 45. | 23 May 1995 | Switzerland | Switzerland | 7–0 | 8–0 | Friendly |
| 46. | 25 May 1995 | Germany | China | 2–0 | 3–1 | Friendly |
| 47. | 5 June 1995 | Karlstad, Sweden | Japan | 1–0 | 1–0 | 1995 FIFA Women's World Cup |
| 48. | 25 October 1996 | Bratislava, Slovakia | Slovakia | 3–0 | 3–0 | UEFA Women's Euro 1997 qualifying |

== Managerial career ==
Immediately after retiring from active football, Neid took a coaching job with the German women's national team. She managed the under-19 team, which won the 2004 World Championship and finished runner-up at the Women's Championship under her guidance.

Neid served as assistant manager of the senior national team under Tina Theune-Meyer, before succeeding Theune-Meyer as head coach on 20 June 2005. She coached the team to victory at the 2007 FIFA Women's World Cup, defeating Brazil 2–0 in the final, and the 2016 Summer Olympics. Neid stepped down as head coach in August 2016.

== Managerial record ==
| Team | From | To | Record | | | | | | | |
| Team | From | To | G | W | D | L | GF | GA | GD | Win % |
|---|---|---|---|---|---|---|---|---|---|---|
| Germany (women) | 20 June 2005 | 19 August 2016 | 169 | 125 | 22 | 22 | 526 | 107 | +419 | 73.96 |

== Honours ==
=== Player ===
SV Bergisch Gladbach 09

- Bundesliga: 1984
- DFB-Pokal: 1984

TSV Siegen

- Bundesliga: 1987, 1990, 1991, 1992, 1994, 1996
- DFB-Pokal: 1986, 1987, 1988, 1989, 1993

Germany Women

- UEFA Women's Championship: 1989, 1991, 1995

=== Manager ===
Germany Women Youth

- UEFA Women's Under-19 Championship: 2000, 2001, 2002
- FIFA U-20 Women's World Cup: 2004

Germany Women

- FIFA Women's World Cup: 2007
- UEFA Women's Championship: 2009, 2013
- Summer Olympic Games: Bronze medal: 2008, Gold medal: 2016
- Algarve Cup: 2006, 2012, 2014

Individual

- FIFA World Coach of the Year for Women's Football: 2010, 2013, 2016
