= Andrea Haberlaß =

German footballer

Personal information
- Date of birth: 26 January 1964 (age 62)
- Position: Defender

International career
Years	Team	Apps	(Gls)
- Germany

Andrea Haberlaß (born 26 January 1964) is a German women's international footballer who plays as a defender. She is a member of the Germany women's national football team. She was part of the team at the 1989 European Competition for Women's Football.
