= Martina Voss-Tecklenburg =

German footballer and manager (born 1967)

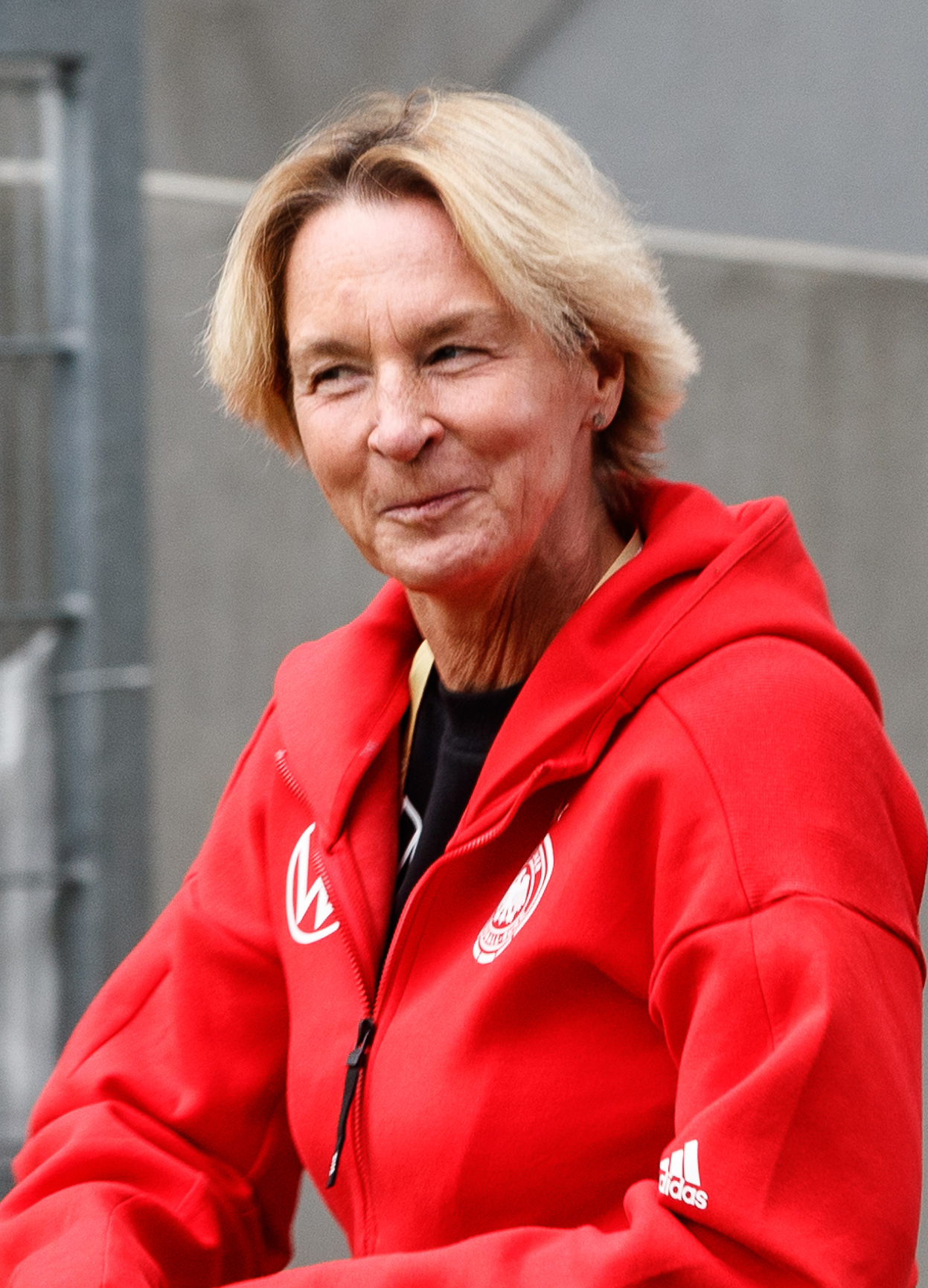
- Voss-Tecklenburg in 2021

Personal information
- Full name: Martina Voss-Tecklenburg
- Birth name: Martina Voss
- Date of birth: 22 December 1967 (age 58)
- Place of birth: Duisburg, West Germany
- Height: 1.67 m (5 ft 6 in)
- Positions: Midfielder; forward

Team information
- Current team: FC Zürich Frauen (head coach)

Senior career*
Years	Team	Apps	(Gls)
1982–1989	KBC Duisburg		
1989–1994	TSV Siegen		
1994–2003	FCR 2001 Duisburg		

International career
1984–2000	Germany	125	(27)

Managerial career
- 2008–2011: FCR 2001 Duisburg
- 2011–2012: FF USV Jena
- 2012–2018: Switzerland
- 2019–2023: Germany
- 2026–: FC Zürich
- * Club domestic league appearances and goals

Martina Voss-Tecklenburg (born Martina Voss; 22 December 1967) is a German football manager and former player who coaches for FC Zürich Frauen. She previously coached FCR 2001 Duisburg and FF USV Jena. As a player, she played as a midfielder or forward, featuring for KBC Duisburg, TSV Siegen and FCR 2001 Duisburg. She made 125 appearances for the Germany national team.

== International career ==
Martina played three FIFA Women's World Cup (1991, 1995, 1999), one Olympiad (1996) and five UEFA Women's Championship (1989, 1991, 1993, 1995, 1997).

== Coaching career ==
=== Early career ===
After the end of her active career as a player, Voss-Tecklenburg worked as a team manager for the Oberliga club SV Straelen. Full-time as a PE teacher association, she takes care of female selection teams in the Lower Rhine. She is also chief editor of the women's football magazine "FF".

From 12 February 2008 to 17 February 2011 she was the head coach of FCR 2001 Duisburg. With Duisburg, Voss-Tecklenburg won the UEFA Women's Cup in 2009 and two national cups in 2009 and 2010. Her contract was ended on 17 February 2011. In June 2011, she signed a one-year contract at Bundesliga side FF USV Jena, but she left the team next January as she was appointed the Swiss national team's new coach.

=== Switzerland ===
Voss-Tecklenburg led Switzerland to reach the 2015 Women's World Cup for the first time in their history. In addition, she managed her team to their first ever European competition in 2017. However, Switzerland failed to qualify to the 2019 Women's World Cup after losing 4–1 to the Netherlands in the play-off final.

=== Germany ===
On 30 November 2018, Voss-Tecklenburg was presented as new coach of Germany. At the 2019 World Cup, Germany were eliminated in the quarterfinals after a 2–1 defeat against Sweden; hence, they lost the opportunity to play at the 2020 Summer Olympics. In the Euro 2022, she led her country to the final, where they lost to the host, England, 2–1 after extra time. In April 2023, she extended her contract along with her assistant Britta Carlson until 2025.

In the 2023 Women's World Cup, Germany won 6–0 over Morocco in the first match, followed by a 2–1 loss to Colombia and a 1–1 draw against South Korea, in which the national team finished third in their group, and were eliminated from the group stage for the first time in their history. After the World Cup she was out with an illness and in October 2023, Horst Hrubesch took over the German team as an interim manager. The contract was voided a month later.

== Personal life ==
She was in a relationship with German football player Inka Grings until 2000. She has been married to German entrepreneur Hermann Tecklenburg since 2009 and has one daughter from a previous marriage, and a grandchild.

== International goals ==
No.	Date	Venue	Opponent	Score	Result	Competition
1.	17 September 1988	Binnigen, Switzerland	Switzerland	9–0	10–0	1989 European Competition for Women's Football qualifying
2.	14 October 1990	Sopron, Hungary	Hungary	2–0	4–0	UEFA Women's Euro 1991 qualifying
3.	31 March 1994	Bielefeld, Germany	Wales	7–0	12–0	UEFA Women's Euro 1995 qualifying
4.	31 March 1994	Bielefeld, Germany	Wales	8–0	12–0	UEFA Women's Euro 1995 qualifying
5.	5 May 1994	Swansea, Wales	Wales	12–0	12–0	UEFA Women's Euro 1995 qualifying
6.	21 September 1994	Sindelfingen, Germany	Croatia	2–0	8–0	UEFA Women's Euro 1995 qualifying
7.	25 September 1994	Weingarten, Germany	Switzerland	5–0	11–0	UEFA Women's Euro 1995 qualifying
8.	13 June 1995	Västerås, Sweden	England	1–0	3–0	1995 FIFA Women's World Cup
9.	2 April 1998	Herford, Germany	Netherlands	1–1	2–1	1999 FIFA Women's World Cup qualification
10.	14 October 1999	Oldenburg, Germany	Iceland	3–0	6–0	UEFA Women's Euro 2001 qualifying

== Honours ==
=== Player ===
KBC Duisburg

- Bundesliga: 1985
- DFB-Pokal: 1983

TSV Siegen

- Bundesliga: 1990, 1991, 1992, 1994
- DFB-Pokal: 1989, 1993

FCR 2001 Duisburg

- Bundesliga: 2000
- DFB-Pokal: 1998

Germany

- FIFA Women's World Cup: runner-up 1995
- UEFA Women's Championship: 1989, 1991, 1995, 1997

Individual

- Footballer of the Year in Germany: 1996, 2000

=== Manager ===
FCR 2001 Duisburg

- UEFA Women's Champions League: 2009
- DFB-Pokal: 2009, 2010

Germany

- UEFA Women's Championship runner-up: 2022
