= Sandra Hengst =

German footballer

Personal information
- Date of birth: 12 April 1973 (age 53)
- Position: Midfielder

Senior career*
Years	Team	Apps	(Gls)
- KBC Duisburg

International career^{‡}
	Germany	4	
- * Club domestic league appearances and goals ‡ National team caps and goals as of 16 November 1991 (before the 1991 FIFA Women's World Cup)

Sandra Hengst (born 12 April 1973) is a German women's international footballer who plays as a midfielder. She is a member of the Germany women's national football team. She was part of the team at the 1991 FIFA Women's World Cup. On club level she plays for KBC Duisburg in Germany.
