= Sissy Raith =

German footballer

Personal information
- Full name: Silvia Raith
- Date of birth: 11 June 1960 (age 66)
- Place of birth: Munich, West Germany
- Height: 1.64 m (5 ft 5 in)
- Positions: Defender; midfielder

Senior career*
Years	Team	Apps	(Gls)
1975–1984	Bayern Munich		
1984–1985	FSV Frankfurt		
1985–1991	TSV Siegen		
1993–1995	SG Praunheim		
1995–1996	FSV Frankfurt		

International career
1983–1991	Germany	58	(4)

Managerial career
- 2005–2008: Bayern Munich
- 2008: Bavarian football association
- 2009: TSV Eching
- 2010–2012: Azerbaijan U17
- 2013–2016: FC Staad
- 2016–2018: Basel
- * Club domestic league appearances and goals

Silvia 'Sissy' Raith (born 11 June 1960, Munich) is a former German footballer. From 2004 to 2008 she coached the Bayern Munich women's team. Starting from 2009 to 2010 she coaches the men's team of TSV Eching. Since 2010 the head coach of Azerbaijan U-17 National women's football team. As a player she was capped 58 times for Germany, winning the UEFA Women's Championship in 1989 and 1991. She also score 4 goals for the national team. She also won 4 German championships and 6 cups, playing for Bayern Munich, FSV Frankfurt, TSV Siegen, and SG Praunheim (now 1.FFC Frankfurt). Sissy worked as a coach of the U-17 Women's team of Azerbaijan. She prepared the girl footballers to the 2012 FIFA U-17 Women's World Cup, which took place in Azerbaijan. Later on, Sissy went to coach FC Staad and Basel in Switzerland.

== International goals ==
No.	Date	Venue	Opponent	Score	Result	Competition
1.	11 July 1990	Frederikshavn Stadion, Frederikshavn, Denmark	Italy	3–0	3–0	UEFA Women's Euro 1991
