= KBC Duisburg =

- Full name: Kaßlerfelder Ballsportclub Duisburg 1888 e.V.
- Founded: 2 September 1888; 136 years ago
- Ground: KBC Sportplatz
- League: Kreisliga C Duisburg Gruppe 3 (XI)
- 2018–19: 11th

KBC Duisburg is a German sports club based in Kaßlerfeld, a suburb of Duisburg, North Rhine-Westphalia. The club was founded in 1888 and is renowned for its defunct women's football team, which won a German championship in 1984–85. Today the club offers tai chi and football, but the men's football department has never been nearly so successful as the women's department was.

== History ==
KBC Duisburg was founded on 2 September 1888 as gymnastics club. The football department was founded in 1908 and quickly rose to become the most important department in the club. Having more and more success the football players began to fancy the idea of forming an independent football club and eventually did just that in the 1920s. The clubs were merged again as TuSpo Kaßlerfeld when the Nazis took over the power in Germany. After the war the clubs from the Kaßlerfeld area founded a new club, named "Kaßlerfelder Ballspielclub". The men's football team had its most successful period in the early 1960s, when they played for several years in the "Kreisklasse" and even achieved a one-year stay in the Bezirksliga.

Today KBC Duisburg has only men's and boys' football teams. The men play in the Kreisliga C, 11th tier football.

== Women's football (1970–1994) ==
The women's football section was founded in 1970 by Paula Schmitz. In 1980 Duisburg reached the final of the German championship for the first time, losing to SSG Bergisch Gladbach 0–5. Three years later the DFB-Pokal was won against FSV Frankfurt 3–0. The Duisburg eleven featured also the then 16-year-old Martina Voss, who became Duisburg's most famous player.

In 1985 KBC won the German championship against Bayern Munich 1–0 and also reached the cup final, but lost against FSV Frankfurt on penalties. Duisburg reached the final for the German championship for the third and last time in 1988, losing to |SSG Bergisch Gladbach. When the Bundesliga was founded in 1990 Duisburg qualified for the league. The first year ended with a runner-up finish to Siegen, but KBC's best times had already passed. The club was relegated at the end of the 1993–94 season. After a few years in the lower divisions the dissolution of the women's football section was agreed to.

=== Honours ===
- German Championship: 1985
- DFB-Pokal: 1983
- Lower Rhine champions: 1974, 1975, 1976, 1977, 1978, 1979, 1981, 1982, 1983, 1984, 1985, 1986, 1987, 1988, 1989
- Lower Rhine cup: 1981, 1982, 1983, 1984, 1985, 1986, 1988, 1989, 1990

=== Notable players ===
The following players of KBC were German internationals:

- Sandra Alter
- Gudrun Gottschlich
- Sandra Hengst
- Andrea Limper
- Birgit Offermann
- Claudia Reichler
- Martina Voss

=== Statistics ===
Season	League	Place	W	D	L	GF	GA	Pts	DFB-Pokal
1990–91	Bundesliga Nord (I)	2	10	7	1	47	16	27	not qualified
1991–92	Bundesliga Nord	6	8	6	6	31	24	22	1st round
1992–93	Bundesliga Nord	5	7	6	5	33	28	20	Quarter-final
1993–94	Bundesliga Nord	10	2	1	15	8	86	5	1st round
1994–95	Regionalliga West (II)	unknown							1st round
Red marks a season followed by relegation.
