= DFB-Pokal Frauen =

- Founded: 1981
- Region: Germany
- Teams: 49
- Current champions: Bayern Munich (3rd title)
- Most championships: VfL Wolfsburg (11 titles)
- Website: Official website
- 2026–27 DFB-Pokal Frauen

The DFB-Pokal Frauen is the main national women's football cup competition in Germany, held annually by the German Football Association in knockout format. It was created in 1980, and since 1991 includes Eastern teams as well. The most recent champions are VfL Wolfsburg (ten consecutive titles), they also won the most titles with eleven. Since 1985 the final has been held in Berlin. This routine changed in 2010 when the DFB gave the final to the city of Cologne. It ever stayed in the city and was held at the RheinEnergieStadion. The final usually takes place on a weekend or holiday in early May.

== Format ==
=== Participation ===
All clubs from the Bundesliga and the 2. Bundesliga are allowed to compete in the cup as are the clubs which gained promotion to the second Bundesliga. Also the winners of the regional cup competitions compete in the cup. As an exception to these rules, clubs' second teams are not allowed to participate in the DFB-Pokal. When a second team wins its regional cup, that team's regional association may send another team to the DFB-Pokal only if the cup winning second team has not also achieved promotion to the 2. Bundesliga.

=== Seeding ===
Of the qualified teams, not all have to compete in the first round. Exactly 32 teams have to compete in the second round of the tournament, so in the first round the number of matches is determined by the number of excess teams. The teams that do not have to compete in the first round are the best finishers from the previous Bundesliga season, the number again determined by the number of entrants to the tournament.

The pairings for round one, two, and three are not entirely random as there is a commission allocating the clubs to two or four groups as they see fit. These groups correspond with the regional provenance of the clubs. In the third round the commission can decide not to allocate the contestants to any groups. Within those groups the clubs are again separated, this time depending on the league they play in. For the draw, clubs from the Bundesligas are put in one pot and the rest in a second pot. Non-Bundesliga clubs automatically have home advantage against clubs from the Bundesligas. From 2025–26 on, 32 teams will compete in a play-off round, while there is no regional split-up (21 winners of the regional cups, five promoted teams from the Regionalliga and six teams from the 2. Bundesliga), to determine the 16 teams in the first round. There, the Bundesliga and the four best-placed teams from the 2. Bundesliga will join.

=== Match rules ===
All games are held over two 45-minute halves with the winner advancing to the next round. In case of a draw, the game gets an extended by two 15-minute halves. If the score is still level after 120 minutes the winner is decided by penalty shootout. In the final no extra time is added in case of a draw after 90 minutes, instead the penalty shootout follows immediately.

== Winners ==
Before the reunification of Germany the cup competition included teams from West Germany only.

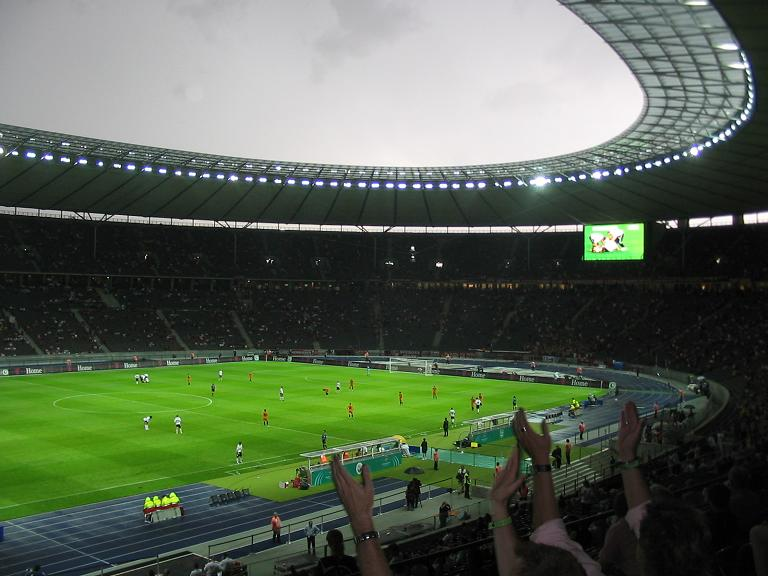
Final 2007 in the Olympic Stadium (Berlin)

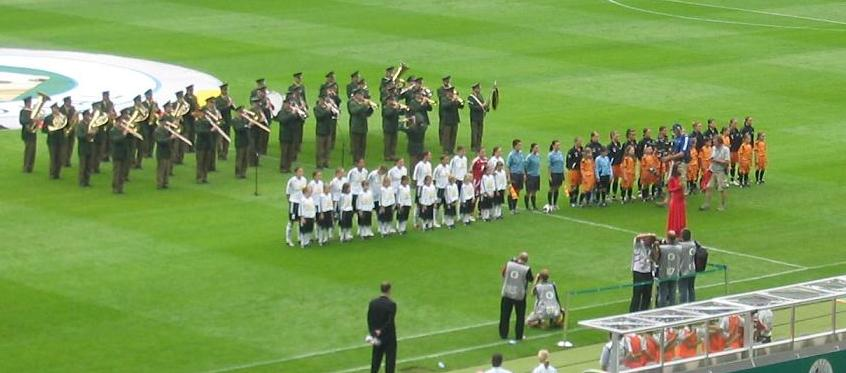
Final 2007 in the Olympic Stadium (Berlin)

Year	Winner	Result	Runner up	Venue
1980–81	Bergisch Gladbach	5–0	TuS Wörrstadt	Stuttgart (Neckarstadion)
1981–82	Bergisch Gladbach	3–0	VfL Wildeshausen	Frankfurt am Main (Waldstadion)
1982–83	KBC Duisburg	3–0	FSV Frankfurt	Frankfurt am Main (Stadion am Bornheimer Hang)
1983–84	Bergisch Gladbach	2–0	VfR Eintracht Wolfsburg	Frankfurt am Main (Waldstadion)
1984–85	FSV Frankfurt	1–1 (a.e.t.) (4–3 p)	KBC Duisburg	West Berlin (Olympic Stadium)
1985–86	Siegen	2–0	Bergisch Gladbach	West Berlin (Olympic Stadium)
1986–87	Siegen	5–2	STV Lövenich	West Berlin (Olympic Stadium)
1987–88	Siegen	4–0	Bayern Munich	West Berlin (Olympic Stadium)
1988–89	Siegen	5–1	FSV Frankfurt	West Berlin (Olympic Stadium)
1989–90	FSV Frankfurt	1–0	Bayern Munich	West Berlin (Olympic Stadium)
1990–91	Grün-Weiß Brauweiler	1–0	Siegen	Berlin (Olympic Stadium)
1991–92	FSV Frankfurt	1–0	Siegen	Berlin (Olympic Stadium)
1992–93	Siegen	1–1 (a.e.t.) (6–5 p)	Grün-Weiß Brauweiler	Berlin (Olympic Stadium)
1993–94	Grün-Weiß Brauweiler	2–1	Siegen	Berlin (Olympic Stadium)
1994–95	FSV Frankfurt	3–1	Siegen	Berlin (Olympic Stadium)
1995–96	FSV Frankfurt	2–1	Klinge Seckach	Berlin (Olympic Stadium)
1996–97	Grün-Weiß Brauweiler	3–1	Eintracht Rheine	Berlin (Olympic Stadium)
1997–98	Duisburg	6–2	FSV Frankfurt	Berlin (Olympic Stadium)
1998–99	FFC Frankfurt	1–0	Duisburg	Berlin (Olympic Stadium)
1999–2000	FFC Frankfurt	2–1	Sportfreunde Siegen	Berlin (Olympic Stadium)
2000–01	FFC Frankfurt	2–1	Flaesheim-Hillen	Berlin (Olympic Stadium)
2001–02	FFC Frankfurt	5–0	Hamburg	Berlin (Olympic Stadium)
2002–03	FFC Frankfurt	1–0	Duisburg	Berlin (Olympic Stadium)
2003–04	Turbine Potsdam	3–0	FFC Frankfurt	Berlin (Olympic Stadium)
2004–05	Turbine Potsdam	3–0	FFC Frankfurt	Berlin (Olympic Stadium)
2005–06	Turbine Potsdam	2–0	FFC Frankfurt	Berlin (Olympic Stadium)
2006–07	FFC Frankfurt	1–1 (4–1 p)	Duisburg	Berlin (Olympic Stadium)
2007–08	FFC Frankfurt	5–1	Saarbrücken	Berlin (Olympic Stadium)
2008–09	Duisburg	7–0	Turbine Potsdam	Berlin (Olympic Stadium)
2009–10	Duisburg	1–0	FF USV Jena	Cologne (RheinEnergieStadion)
2010–11	FFC Frankfurt	2–0	Turbine Potsdam	Cologne (RheinEnergieStadion)
2011–12	Bayern Munich	2–0	FFC Frankfurt	Cologne (RheinEnergieStadion)
2012–13	VfL Wolfsburg	3–2	Turbine Potsdam	Cologne (RheinEnergieStadion)
2013–14	1. FFC Frankfurt	3–0	SGS Essen	Cologne (RheinEnergieStadion)
2014–15	VfL Wolfsburg	3–0	Turbine Potsdam	Cologne (RheinEnergieStadion)
2015–16	VfL Wolfsburg	2–1	SC Sand	Cologne (RheinEnergieStadion)
2016–17	VfL Wolfsburg	2–1	SC Sand	Cologne (RheinEnergieStadion)
2017–18	VfL Wolfsburg	0–0 (a.e.t.) (3–2 p)	Bayern Munich	Cologne (RheinEnergieStadion)
2018–19	VfL Wolfsburg	1–0	SC Freiburg	Cologne (RheinEnergieStadion)
2019–20	VfL Wolfsburg	3–3 (a.e.t.) (4–2 p)	SGS Essen	Cologne (RheinEnergieStadion)
2020–21	VfL Wolfsburg	1–0 (a.e.t.)	Eintracht Frankfurt	Cologne (RheinEnergieStadion)
2021–22	VfL Wolfsburg	4–0	Turbine Potsdam	Cologne (RheinEnergieStadion)
2022–23	VfL Wolfsburg	4–1	SC Freiburg	Cologne (RheinEnergieStadion)
2023–24	VfL Wolfsburg	2–0	Bayern Munich	Cologne (RheinEnergieStadion)
2024–25	Bayern Munich	4–2	Werder Bremen	Cologne (RheinEnergieStadion)
2025–26	Bayern Munich	4–0	VfL Wolfsburg	Cologne (RheinEnergieStadion)

== Winners by team ==
Club	Titles	Runner-up
VfL Wolfsburg	11	2*
Eintracht Frankfurt**	9	5
TSV Siegen	5	5
FSV Frankfurt	5	3
Turbine Potsdam	3	5
Bayern Munich	3	4
FCR Duisburg	3	3
Bergisch Gladbach	3	1
Grün-Weiß Brauweiler	3	1
KBC Duisburg	1	1
SC Sand	0	2
SGS Essen	0	2
SC Freiburg	0	2
FFC Flaesheim-Hillen	0	1
Hamburger SV	0	1
FF USV Jena	0	1
STV Lövenich	0	1
Eintracht Rheine	0	1
1. FC Saarbrücken	0	1
SC Klinge Seckach	0	1
VfL Wildeshausen	0	1
TuS Wörrstadt	0	1

(*) Note: One runner-up of VfL Wolfsburg as VfR Eintracht Wolfsburg.

(**) Note: All titles/runner-ups of Eintracht Frankfurt with the exception of runner-up 2020/21 as 1. FFC Frankfurt.
