= SV Bergisch Gladbach 09 =

German football club

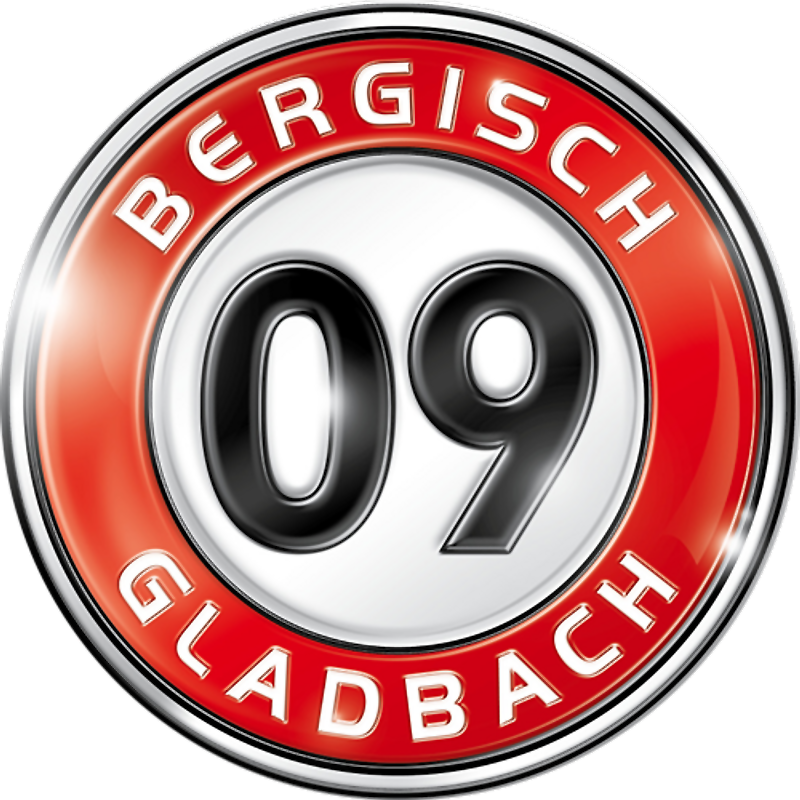
- Full name: Sportverein Bergisch Gladbach 09 e. V.
- Founded: 1909
- Ground: Belkaw-Arena
- Capacity: 10,500
- Chairman: Rudolf Bauch
- Manager: Kevin Kruth
- League: Regionalliga West (IV)
- 2025–26: Oberliga Mittelrhein, 1st of 16 (promoted)
Home colours	Away colours

SV Bergisch Gladbach 09 is a German association football club from the city of Bergisch Gladbach in North Rhine-Westphalia.

== History ==
The club was established in 1909 as Fußball Club Bergisch Gladbach and was joined that same year by the membership of FC Montania Bergisch-Gladbach. On 22 January 1919, FC merged with Turn- und Sportverein der Firma J. W. Zanders Bergisch Gladbach to form Sport-Verein Bergisch Gladbach. This club merged with VfL Gronau in 1936. The team emerged from lower-tier play into the Landesliga Rheinbezirk in 1948, and in the following season, into the 2. Liga-West (II). Following league reorganization in 1952, FC settled into the Amateurliga Mittelrhein (III), where they first took a group title within the division in 1953 before moving on to capture the national amateur final 3:2 over Homberger SV. This led to a first-round DFB-Pokal (German Cup) appearance in 1954, which was followed by additional Amateurliga Mittelrhein group titles in 1955, 1956, and 1958. FC was unable to match its earlier success and the team's performance fell off entering into the 1960s. They played as a lower-table third-division side into the early 1970s.

A 1973 merger with SSG Bergisch Gladbach – itself newly formed out of the union of SV Blau-Weiss 1962 Hand, SV Katterbach, and Sportfreunde Paffrath – failed to improve the club's fortunes, and SSG slipped to lower-level competition. The club has since made sporadic appearances in the Oberliga Nordrhein (IV) (1987–88, 1996–98, 2003–04), most recently returning to fourth-tier play in 2006. In 2007 Bergisch Gladbach decided to drop SSG from its name. The club changed its name again in April 2008 to SV Bergisch Gladbach 09, though it is called Bergisch Gladbach 09 most of the time.

After a number of seasons fluctuating between the Verbandsliga Mittelrhein and the Oberliga Nordrhein, the club won promotion to the NRW-Liga in 2009. When this league was disbanded in 2012, they were admitted to the Regionalliga West, where they lasted for just one season before being relegated to the Mittelrheinliga. They were promoted back to the Regionalliga West as champions in 2019 but were relegated again two years later.

== Current squad ==
As of 8 September 2026

Note: Flags indicate national team as defined under FIFA eligibility rules; some limited exceptions apply. Players may hold more than one non-FIFA nationality.

No.	Pos.	Nation	Player
1	GK	GER	Robin Schulze
2	DF	GER	Elyas Aydin
3	DF	GER	Mathias Hülsenbusch
4	DF	GER	Maik Marquardt
5	MF	GER	Daniel Spiegel
6	MF	GER	Jonas Rücker
7	FW	GER	Finn Stromberg
8	MF	GER	Ardit Mimini
9	FW	UKR	Denys Pinchuk
10	FW	GER	Tristan Arndt
11	DF	GER	Jan Luca Bugenhagen
12	MF	GER	Luis Altmayer
13	DF	MKD	Rexhep Ajdari
15	MF	GER	Eray Sariaydin

No.	Pos.	Nation	Player
16	MF	TUR	Yadigar Dogan
17	MF	GER	Joel Kouekem
18	DF	GER	Fabian Fricke (on loan from Viktoria Köln)
20	MF	GER	Claudio Heider
21	FW	UKR	Artem Belousov
22	MF	GER	Ole Tillmann
23	MF	GER	Ervin Cindrak
24	DF	GER	Eliot Albert
29	FW	GER	Sami Akremi
-	DF	GER	Tilman Demmer
-	DF	GER	Yannick Kim
-	MF	GER	Daniel Candido Kritsch
-	MF	GER	Constantin Bürger

== Women's football ==
Bergisch Gladbach fielded a successful women's side that has a record nine national titles to its credit, as well as three Frauen DFB-Pokal wins. Though the club has produced 18 players who played for the German national team, Silvia Neid is by the most notable former player of the club. The women's football department left the club in 1996 to become part of TuS Köln rrh., which in turn passed their licence to Bayer Leverkusen after the 2007–08 season.

== Honours ==
=== Men's ===
German amateur championship

- Champions (1): 1953

Landesliga Mittelrhein (V)

- Champions (1): 1995

Mittelrheinliga (V)

- Champions (2): 2019, 2026

Verbandsliga Mittelrhein

- Champions (3): 1996, 2006, 2009

=== Women's ===
Women's World Invitational Tournament

- Champions (2): 1981, (Note: As Germany women's national football team) 1984 (Note: As Germany women's national football team)
- Third place (1): 1987 (Note: As Germany women's national football team)

German champions

- Champions (9): 1977, 1979, 1980, 1981, 1982, 1983, 1984, 1988, 1989

DFB-Pokal

- Champions (3): 1981, 1982, 1984
