= List of SC Sand seasons =

This is a list of seasons played by the women's association football team of SC Sand, a sports club from Willstätt currently competing in the German Bundesliga.

== Summary ==
Champions	Runners-up	Promoted	Relegated

Domestic and international results of SC Sand
Season	League										Cup	Europe	League top scorers					
Season	Tier	Division	Pos	P	W	D	L	F	A	Pts	Cup	Europe	1st	Goal	2nd	Goal	3rd	Goal
2003–04	2	Regionalliga (South Group)	6	18	8	4	6	43	25	28								
2004–05	2	2. Bundesliga (South Group)	6	20	10	4	6	31	26	34	R32							
2005–06	2	2. Bundesliga (South Group)	6	22	9	4	9	25	32	31	QF							
2006–07	2	2. Bundesliga (South Group)	7	22	8	3	11	38	46	27	QF							
2007–08	2	2. Bundesliga (South Group)	6	22	8	4	10	33	34	28	R32							
2008–09	2	2. Bundesliga (South Group)	8	22	6	6	10	37	47	24	R16							
2009–10	2	2. Bundesliga (South Group)	6	22	8	3	11	38	36	27	R32							
2010–11	2	2. Bundesliga (South Group)	11	22	7	0	15	25	46	21	R64		(Germany) Migliazza	7	(Germany) Veth	6	(Germany) Angel	4
2011–12	3	Regionalliga (South Group)	1	18	13	1	4	41	18	40	R32							
2012–13	2	2. Bundesliga (South Group)	3	22	17	3	2	65	22	54	QF		(Switzerland) Meyer	15	(Germany) Veth	14	(New Zealand) Hassett	11
2013–14	2	2. Bundesliga (South Group)	1	22	21	1	0	89	12	64	SF		(Italy) Mauro	24	(Switzerland) Meyer	15	(Germany) van Bonn ^{N}	11
2014–15	1	Bundesliga	10	22	5	4	13	27	43	19	QF		(Italy) Mauro	8	(Germany) Veth	7	(Germany) Hanebeck	3
2015–16	1	Bundesliga	9	22	8	4	10	29	30	28	RU		(Austria) Burger	8	(Serbia) Damnjanović	6	(Switzerland) Meyer ^{N}	3
2016–17	1	Bundesliga	8	22	8	3	11	29	23	27	RU		(Austria) Burger	7	(Slovakia) Škorvánková ^{N}	3	(Austria) Feiersinger ^{N}	3
2017–18	1	Bundesliga	7	22	9	3	10	32	34	30	QF		(Austria) Burger	10	(Austria) Hanshaw	5	two players	5
2018–19	1	Bundesliga	8	22	6	7	9	29	40	25	R16		(Bosnia and Herzegovina) Nikolić	5	(Serbia) Blagojević	4	(Austria) Burger	4
2019–20	1	Bundesliga	8	22	8	1	13	24	43	25	QF		(Serbia) Blagojević	5	(Germany) Fiebig	4	two players	3
2020–21	1	Bundesliga	10	22	5	3	14	21	53	18	R16		(Germany) Bouziane	5	(Germany) Hoppius	4	three players	2
2021–22	1	Bundesliga	11	22	3	4	15	16	45	13	QF		(Germany) Hoppius	4	(Germany) Evels	2	(Austria) Gentile	2
2022–23	2	2. Bundesliga	7	26	9	8	9	24	25	35	R16		(Germany) König	6	(Germany) Klostermann	4	three players	3
2023–24	2	2. Bundesliga	6	26	12	7	7	45	32	43	R2		(Poland) Matuschewski	12	(Germany) Fischer	6	(United States) Loving	6
2024–25	2	2. Bundesliga	4	26	14	5	7	66	46	47	R2		(Canada) Way	12	(Poland) Matuschewski	11	(Germany) Homann	10
2025–26	2	2. Bundesliga	3	26	16	5	5	53	26	53	QF		(Germany) Reininger	15	(Poland) Matuschewski	12	(Germany) Fischer	7
