= 2007–08 in German football =

Football in Germany
- Season: 2007–08

Men's football
- Bundesliga: Bayern Munich
- 2. Bundesliga: Borussia Mönchengladbach
- DFB-Pokal: Bayern Munich
- DFL-Ligapokal: Bayern Munich

Women's football
- Frauen-Bundesliga: 1. FFC Frankfurt
- DFB-Pokal: 1. FFC Frankfurt

The 2007–08 season is the 98th season of competitive football in Germany.

== Promotion and relegation ==
=== Pre Season ===
League	Promoted to League	Relegated from League
Bundesliga	Karlsruher SC; Hansa Rostock; MSV Duisburg	Alemannia Aachen; Borussia Mönchengladbach; Mainz 05
2. Bundesliga	FC St. Pauli; VfL Osnabrück; SV Wehen Wiesbaden; TSG 1899 Hoffenheim	Eintracht Braunschweig; Rot-Weiss Essen; SpVgg Unterhaching; SV Wacker Burghausen
Bundesliga (women)	1. FC Saarbrücken; SG Wattenscheid 09	FFC Brauweiler Pulheim; FFC Heike Rheine
2. Bundesliga (women)	FFC Oldesloe 2000; 1. FC Union Berlin; ASV Hagsfeld; FCR 2001 Duisburg II; SV Dirmingen	Bad Neuenahr II; FC Erzgebirge Aue; Karlsruher SC; TSV Jahn Calden; SuS Timmel

=== Post Season ===
League	Promoted to League	Relegated from League
Bundesliga	Borussia Mönchengladbach; TSG 1899 Hoffenheim; 1. FC Köln	1. FC Nürnberg; Hansa Rostock; MSV Duisburg
2. Bundesliga	Rot Weiss Ahlen; FSV Frankfurt; FC Ingolstadt 04; Rot-Weiß Oberhausen	FC Carl Zeiss Jena; FC Erzgebirge Aue; Kickers Offenbach; SC Paderborn 07
Bundesliga (women)	Herforder SV; USV Jena	1. FC Saarbrücken; SG Wattenscheid 09
2. Bundesliga (women)	Blau-Weiß Hohen Neuendorf; FV Löchgau; SG Lütgendortmund; Mellendorfer TV; FSV Viktoria Jägersburg	FFV Neubrandenburg; FFC Heike Rheine; TuS Niederkirchen; SC Regensburg; FFC Brauweiler Pulheim

== National teams ==
=== Germany national football team ===
==== UEFA Euro 2008 qualification ====
Win Draw Loss

Date	Venue	Location	Opponent	Score F–A	Att.	Goalscorers and disciplined players		Ref.
Date	Venue	Location	Opponent	Score F–A	Att.	Germany	Opponent	Ref.
8 September 2007	Millennium Stadium	Cardiff, Wales	Wales	2–0	25,000	Klose 6', 60'	Gabbidon (yellow card) 38'; Collins (yellow card) 41'	
13 October 2007	Croke Park	Dublin, Ireland	Republic of Ireland	0–0	67,495	Lehmann (yellow card) 52'; Frings (yellow card) 55'; Friedrich (yellow card) 90'	Carsley (yellow card) 36'; Dunne (yellow card) 44'	
17 October 2007	Allianz Arena	Munich, Germany	Czech Republic	0–3	66,600	Podolski (yellow card) 46'	Sionko 2'; Matějovský 23'; Plašil 63'	
17 November 2007	AWD-Arena	Hanover, Germany	Cyprus	4–0	45,016	Fritz 2'; Klose 20'; Podolski 20'; Hitzlsperger 82'	—	
21 November 2007	Commerzbank-Arena	Frankfurt, Germany	Wales	0–0	49,252	—	Collins (yellow card) 82'; Gabbidon (yellow card) 83'; Hennessey (yellow card) 89'	

==== UEFA Euro 2008 ====
Win Draw Loss

Round	Date Kick–off time	Venue	Location	Opponent	Score F–A	Att.	Goalscorers and disciplined players		Ref.
Round	Date Kick–off time	Venue	Location	Opponent	Score F–A	Att.	Germany	Opponent	Ref.
Group B	8 June 2008; 20:45 (CEST)	Wörthersee Stadion	Klagenfurt, Austria	Poland	2–0	30,461	Podolski 20', 72'; Schweinsteiger (yellow card) 64'	Smolarek (yellow card) 40'; Lewandowski (yellow card) 60'	
Group B	12 June 2008; 18:00 (CEST)	Wörthersee Stadion	Klagenfurt, Austria	Croatia	2–1	30,461	Ballack (yellow card) 75'; Podolski 79'; Lehmann (yellow card) 90+2'; Schweinsteiger (red card) 90+2'	Srna 24' (yellow card) 27'; Šimunić (yellow card) 45+1'; Olić 62'; Leko (yellow card) 90+2'; Modrić (yellow card) 90+3'	
Group B	16 June 2008; 20:45 (CEST)	Ernst-Happel-Stadion	Vienna, Austria	Austria	1–0	51,428	Ballack 49'	Stranzl (yellow card) 13'; Hoffer (yellow card) 31'; Ivanschitz (yellow card) 48'	
Quarter-finals	19 June 2008; 20:45 (CEST)	St. Jakob-Park	Basel, Switzerland	Portugal	3–2	39,374	Schweinsteiger 22'; Klose 26'; Friedrich (yellow card) 48'; Lahm (yellow card) 49'; Ballack 61'	Petit (yellow card) 26'; Gomes 40'; Pepe (yellow card) 60'; Postiga 87' (yellow card) 90'	
Semi-finals	25 June 2008; 20:45 (CEST)	St. Jakob-Park	Basel, Switzerland	Turkey	3–2	39,374	Schweinsteiger 26'; Klose 79'; Lahm 90'	Boral 22'; Şentürk (yellow card) 53' (goal) 86'; Sarıoğlu (yellow card) 90+4'	
Final	29 June 2008; 20:45 (CEST)	Ernst-Happel-Stadion	Vienna, Austria	Spain	0–1	51,428	Ballack (yellow card) 43'; Kurányi (yellow card) 88'	Torres 33' (yellow card) 74'; Casillas (yellow card) 43'	

==== Friendly matches ====
Date	Venue	Location	Opponent	Score F–A	Att.	Goalscorers and disciplined players		Ref.
Date	Venue	Location	Opponent	Score F–A	Att.	Germany	Opponent	Ref.
22 August 2007	Wembley Stadium	London, England	England	2–1	86,133	Kuranyi 26'; Pander 40'	Lampard 9'; Cole (yellow card) 34'	
12 September 2007	RheinEnergieStadion	Cologne, Germany	Romania	3–1	44,500	Schneider 42'; Trochowski (yellow card) 61'; Odonkor 65'; Podolski 82' (yellow card) 82'	Goian 3'; Nicolita (yellow card) 54'	
6 February 2008	Ernst-Happel-Stadion	Vienna, Austria	Austria	3–0	48,500	Hitzlsperger 53'; Klose 63'; Friedrich (yellow card) 71'; Mertesacker (yellow card) 77'; Ballack (yellow card) 78'; Gómez 80'	Aufhauser (yellow card) 48'; Linz (yellow card) 78'	
26 March 2008	St. Jakob-Park	Basel, Switzerland	Switzerland	4–0	38,500	Klose 23' (yellow card) 48'; Schweinsteiger (yellow card) 45'; Gómez 61', 67'	Inler (yellow card) 65'	
27 May 2008	Fritz Walter Stadion	Kaiserslautern, Germany	Belarus	2–2	47,258	Klose 10'; Karytska 20' (o.g.)	Lentsevich (yellow card) 9'; Putsila (yellow card) 15'; Bulyga 61', 88'	
31 May 2008	Veltins-Arena	Gelsenkirchen, Germany	Serbia	2–1	53,951	Neuville 74'; Ballack 82'	Janković 18'; Ivanović (yellow card) 80'	

=== Germany women's national football team ===
==== 2007 FIFA Women's World Cup ====
Win Draw Loss

Round	Date Kick–off time	Venue	Location	Opponent	Score F–A	Att.	Goalscorers and disciplined players		Ref.
Round	Date Kick–off time	Venue	Location	Opponent	Score F–A	Att.	Germany	Opponent	Ref.
Group A	10 September 2007; 20:00 (CST)	Hongkou Football Stadium	Shanghai, China	Argentina	11–0	28,098	Behringer 12', 24'; Garefrekes 17'; Prinz 29', 45+1', 59'; Lingor 51', 90+1'; Smisek 57', 70', 79'; Laudehr (yellow card) 60'; Bartusiak (yellow card) 86'	Gómez (yellow card) 16'; Chávez (yellow card) 20'; González (yellow card) 56'; Quiñones (yellow card) 90+2'	
Group A	14 September 2007; 20:00 (CST)	Hongkou Football Stadium	Shanghai, China	England	0–0	27,730	Krahn (yellow card) 36'; Laudehr (yellow card) 84'; Bajramaj (yellow card) 85'	Chapman (yellow card) 16'; Williams (yellow card) 55'	
Group A	17 September 2007; 20:00 (CST)	Yellow Dragon Stadium	Hangzhou, China	Japan	2–0	39,817	Prinz 21'; Garefrekes (yellow card) 82'; Lingor 87' (pen.); Müller (yellow card) 88'	Sakai (yellow card) 16'	
Quarter-finals	22 September 2007; 17:00 (CST)	Wuhan Sports Center Stadium	Wuhan, China	North Korea	3–0	37,200	Garefrekes 44'; Lingor 67'; Krahn 72'	Song (yellow card) 51'	
Semi-finals	26 September 2007; 20:00 (CST)	Tianjin Olympic Center Stadium	Tianjin, China	Norway	3–0	53,819	Rønning 42' (o.g.); Stegemann 72'; Müller 75'	Kaurin (yellow card) 14'	
Final	30 September 2007; 20:00 (CST)	Hongkou Football Stadium	Shanghai, China	Brazil	2–0	31,000	Garefrekes (yellow card) 7'; Prinz 52'; Bresonik (yellow card) 63'; Laudehr 86'	Daniela (yellow card) 59'	

== League season ==
=== Men ===
==== Bundesliga ====
Pos	Team	Pld	W	D	L	GF	GA	GD	Pts	Qualification or relegation
1	Bayern Munich (C)	34	22	10	2	68	21	+47	76	Qualification to Champions League group stage
2	Werder Bremen	34	20	6	8	75	45	+30	66	Qualification to Champions League group stage
3	Schalke 04	34	18	10	6	55	32	+23	64	Qualification to Champions League third qualifying round
4	Hamburger SV	34	14	12	8	47	26	+21	54	Qualification to UEFA Cup first round
5	VfL Wolfsburg	34	15	9	10	58	46	+12	54	Qualification to UEFA Cup first round
6	VfB Stuttgart	34	16	4	14	57	57	0	52	Qualification to Intertoto Cup third round
7	Bayer Leverkusen	34	15	6	13	57	40	+17	51	
8	Hannover 96	34	13	10	11	54	56	−2	49	
9	Eintracht Frankfurt	34	12	10	12	43	50	−7	46	
10	Hertha BSC	34	12	8	14	39	44	−5	44	Qualification to UEFA Cup first qualifying round (Note: An additional UEFA Cup spot was awarded to the Bundesliga after it had been drawn from the best teams of the UEFA Fair Play ranking 2007–08. The spot was awarded to national Fair Play competition winners Hertha BSC.)
11	Karlsruher SC	34	11	10	13	38	53	−15	43	
12	VfL Bochum	34	10	11	13	48	54	−6	41	
13	Borussia Dortmund	34	10	10	14	50	62	−12	40	Qualification to UEFA Cup first round (Note: Because German Cup 2007–08 winners Bayern Munich had already qualified for the Champions League via their league placement, losing finalists Borussia Dortmund took the UEFA Cup spot reserved for the cup winners.)
14	Energie Cottbus	34	9	9	16	35	56	−21	36	
15	Arminia Bielefeld	34	8	10	16	35	60	−25	34	
16	1. FC Nürnberg (R)	34	7	10	17	35	51	−16	31	Relegation to 2. Bundesliga
17	Hansa Rostock (R)	34	8	6	20	30	52	−22	30	Relegation to 2. Bundesliga
18	MSV Duisburg (R)	34	8	5	21	36	55	−19	29	Relegation to 2. Bundesliga

Source: www.dfb.de
Rules for classification: 1) points; 2) goal difference; 3) number of goals scored.
(C) Champions; (R) Relegated

==== 2. Bundesliga ====
Pos	Team	Pld	W	D	L	GF	GA	GD	Pts	Promotion or relegation
1	Borussia Mönchengladbach (C, P)	34	18	12	4	71	38	+33	66	Promotion to Bundesliga
2	1899 Hoffenheim (P)	34	17	9	8	60	40	+20	60	Promotion to Bundesliga
3	1. FC Köln (P)	34	17	9	8	62	44	+18	60	Promotion to Bundesliga
4	Mainz 05	34	16	10	8	62	36	+26	58	
5	SC Freiburg	34	15	10	9	49	44	+5	55	
6	SpVgg Greuther Fürth	34	14	10	10	53	47	+6	52	
7	Alemannia Aachen	34	14	9	11	49	44	+5	51	
8	Wehen Wiesbaden	34	11	11	12	47	53	−6	44	
9	FC St. Pauli	34	11	9	14	47	53	−6	42	
10	TuS Koblenz (Note: Due to licensing irregularities TuS Koblenz were given a six points deduction.)	34	12	11	11	46	47	−1	41	
11	1860 Munich	34	9	14	11	42	45	−3	41	
12	VfL Osnabrück	34	10	10	14	43	54	−11	40	
13	1. FC Kaiserslautern	34	9	12	13	37	37	0	39	
14	FC Augsburg	34	10	8	16	39	51	−12	38	
15	Kickers Offenbach (R)	34	9	11	14	38	60	−22	38	Relegation to 3. Liga
16	Erzgebirge Aue (R)	34	7	11	16	49	57	−8	32	Relegation to 3. Liga
17	SC Paderborn (R)	34	6	13	15	33	54	−21	31	Relegation to 3. Liga
18	Carl Zeiss Jena (R)	34	6	11	17	45	68	−23	29	Relegation to 3. Liga

Source: Bundesliga.de
Rules for classification: 1) points; 2) goal difference; 3) number of goals scored.
(C) Champions; (P) Promoted; (R) Relegated

=== Women ===
==== Bundesliga ====
Pos	Team	Pld	W	D	L	GF	GA	GD	Pts	Qualification or relegation
1	1. FFC Frankfurt (C)	22	17	3	2	87	22	+65	54	2007–08 Bundesliga (women) champions
2	FCR 2001 Duisburg	22	17	2	3	65	20	+45	53	
3	1. FFC Turbine Potsdam	22	11	5	6	48	32	+16	38	
4	FC Bayern Munich	22	12	2	8	53	38	+15	38	
5	SC 07 Bad Neuenahr	22	12	1	9	43	33	+10	37	
6	VfL Wolfsburg	22	10	4	8	42	48	−6	34	
7	SG Essen-Schönebeck	22	9	6	7	43	40	+3	33	
8	SC Freiburg	22	6	3	13	30	63	−33	21	
9	TSV Crailsheim	22	5	4	13	28	43	−15	19	
10	Hamburger SV	22	4	6	12	23	43	−20	18	
11	1. FC Saarbrücken (Note: Promoted from the 2. Bundesliga (women) last season)	22	4	6	12	26	51	−25	18	Will be relegated to the 2. Bundesliga (women)
12	SG Wattenscheid 09	22	3	2	17	17	69	−52	11	Will be relegated to the 2. Bundesliga (women)

(C) Champions

==== 2. Bundesliga ====
===== North =====
Pos	Team	Pld	W	D	L	GF	GA	GD	Pts	Promotion or relegation
1	HSV Borussia Friedenstal	22	13	5	4	53	33	+20	44	Will be promoted to the Fußball-Bundesliga (women)
2	Tennis Borussia Berlin	22	12	7	3	36	18	+18	43	
3	FC Gütersloh 2000	22	12	6	4	38	18	+20	42	
4	1.FFC Turbine Potsdam II	22	12	4	6	46	23	+23	40	
5	Hamburger SV II	22	9	5	8	32	33	−1	32	
6	Holstein Kiel	22	9	5	8	28	31	−3	32	
7	1. FC Lokomotive Leipzig	22	9	4	9	38	42	−4	31	
8	FFC Oldesloe 2000 (Note: Promoted from the Regionalliga last season)	22	8	4	10	30	36	−6	28	
9	SV Victoria Gersten	22	7	6	9	38	39	−1	27	
10	1. FC Union Berlin	22	6	3	13	28	48	−20	21	
11	FFV Neubrandenburg	22	4	3	15	34	56	−22	15	Will be relegated to the new Fußball-Regionalliga (women)
12	FFC Heike Rheine (Note: Relegated from the Bundesliga last season)	22	3	4	15	26	50	−24	13	Will be relegated to the new Fußball-Regionalliga (women)

===== South =====
Pos	Team	Pld	W	D	L	GF	GA	GD	Pts	Promotion or relegation
1	FF USV Jena	22	18	2	2	82	13	+69	56	Will be promoted to the Fußball-Bundesliga (women)
2	VfL Sindelfingen	22	18	2	2	70	14	+56	56	
3	FCR 2001 Duisburg II (Note: Promoted from the Regionalliga last season)	22	12	4	6	47	31	+16	40	
4	TuS Köln rrh. (Note: TuS Köln rrh. passed their license for the 2. Bundesliga to Bayer 04 Leverkusen.)	22	10	6	6	46	28	+18	36	
5	ASV Hagsfeld	22	9	4	9	38	49	−11	31	
6	SC Sand	22	8	4	10	33	34	−1	28	
7	1. FFC Frankfurt II	22	6	7	9	30	28	+2	25	
8	SV Dirmingen	22	7	4	11	30	58	−28	25	
9	TuS Niederkirchen (Note: TuS Niederkirchen did not apply for a license for the 2008–09 season and was therefore the fifth team to be relegated.)	22	5	5	12	29	58	−29	20	Will be relegated to the new Fußball-Regionalliga (women)
10	FFC Wacker München	22	5	5	12	22	52	−30	20	
11	SC Regensburg	22	5	4	13	36	59	−23	19	Will be relegated to the new Fußball-Regionalliga (women)
12	FFC Brauweiler Pulheim (Note: Relegated from the Bundesliga last season)	22	3	5	14	25	64	−39	14	Will be relegated to the new Fußball-Regionalliga (women)

== Transfers ==
- List of German football transfers summer 2007
- List of German football transfers winter 2007–08
