= 2008–09 in German football =

Football in Germany
- Season: 2008–09

Men's football
- Bundesliga: VfL Wolfsburg
- 2. Bundesliga: SC Freiburg
- 3. Liga: Union Berlin
- DFB-Pokal: Werder Bremen

Women's football
- Frauen-Bundesliga: Turbine Potsdam
- DFB-Pokal: FCR 2001 Duisburg

The 2008–09 season was the 99th season of competitive football in Germany. It lasted from 1 July 2008 until 30 June 2009.

== Diary of the season ==
5 October 2008 – Jos Luhukay is released from his duties as head coach of Borussia Mönchengladbach after 20 months over a series of bad results. Director of sporting affairs Christian Ziege acts as a caretaker until a new coach has been found.

19 October 2008 – Hans Meyer is introduced as the new head coach of Borussia Mönchengladbach. It is his second spell with the club after a four-year stint between 1999 and 2003.

23 November 2008 – Armin Veh, head coach of defending champions VfB Stuttgart, is sacked after 33 months. Former player Markus Babbel, who has retired after last season, takes over the coaching duties. Babbel is assigned the title of a "teamchef" since he does not own a professional coaching license.

26 March 2009 – Fred Rutten is sacked as head coach of FC Schalke 04 after 9 months. A well-below-expectation season performance, including early exits in the UEFA Cup and DFB-Pokal competitions and a dismal eighth place in the Bundesliga, is cited as the reason.

1 April 2009 – FC Schalke 04 announces that assistant coaches Mike Büskens, Youri Mulder and Oliver Reck will once again act as caretakers for the remainder of the season.

27 April 2009 – Jürgen Klinsmann is released from his duties as FC Bayern Munich head coach. "Endangered minimum season goals" are cited as the cause of his dismissal after ten months. Jupp Heynckes, who coincidentally visits the Bayern match before Klinsmann's exit, and reserves coach Hermann Gerland are appointed as caretakers. Mehmet Scholl is assigned as temporary coach for the 3. Liga reserve team.

6 May 2009 – Felix Magath, manager of championship contenders VfL Wolfsburg, is announced as new FC Schalke 04 manager for the 2009–10 season. Magath signs a four-year contract with the club.

14 May 2009 – Louis van Gaal is confirmed as new head coach of Bayern Munich for the 2009–10 season. Van Gaal, who won the Eredivisie with AZ Alkmaar, signs a two-year contract.

17 May 2009 – Just prior to the last matchday, Michael Frontzeck is ousted as Arminia Bielefeld head coach in a last attempt to save the club from relegation. Jörg Berger is assigned as a caretaker two days later.

21 May 2009 – Friedhelm Funkel announces he resignment after five seasons as Eintracht Frankfurt head coach at the end of the season.

26 May 2009 – Martin Jol, head coach of Hamburger SV, leaves the club for Eredivisie sides Ajax Amsterdam.

28 May 2009 – Hans Meyer announces he retirement as a coach after successfully avoiding relegation with Borussia Mönchengladbach

2 June 2009 – In a surprise move, Christoph Daum skips his last year with 1. FC Köln to become the new head coach of Turkish Süper Lig sides Fenerbahçe.

3 June 2009 – Michael Frontzeck signs a two-year contract as head coach of Borussia Mönchengladbach.

4 June 2009 – Michael Skibbe is appointed as new head coach of Eintracht Frankfurt. Skibbe signs a two-year contract with the club.

5 June 2009 – Bruno Labbadia, head coach of Bayer Leverkusen, leaves the club after just one year and takes over Hamburger SV. Labbadia signs a two-year contract with Hamburg. Jupp Heynckes is named as Labbadia's successor, also signing a two-year contract.

12 June 2009 – Former Bundesliga player Zvonimir Soldo signs a two-year contract as head coach of 1. FC Köln. Soldo enters Cologne after a Prva HNL title with Croatian team Dinamo Zagreb.

== Men's national team ==
=== Friendly matches ===
20 August 2008
21:00 UTC+2

Germany	2–0	Belgium
Schweinsteiger 59' (pen.); Marin 77'	Report

Frankenstadion, Nuremberg
Attendance: 34,117
Referee: Thomas Vejlgaard (Denmark)

19 November 2008
20:45 UTC+1

Germany	1–2	England
Helmes 63'	Report	Upson 23'; Terry 84'

Olympic Stadium, Berlin
Attendance: 74,224
Referee: Massimo Busacca (Italy)

11 February 2009
20:30 UTC+1

Germany	0–1	Norway
	Report	Grindheim 63'

LTU Arena, Düsseldorf
Attendance: 45,000
Referee: Stefan Meßner (Austria)

29 May 2009
14:00 UTC+2

China	1–1	Germany
Hao Junmin 5'	Report	Podolski 7'

Shanghai Stadium, Shanghai
Attendance: 25,000
Referee: Lee Min Hu (South Korea)

2 June 2009
20:00 UTC+2

United Arab Emirates	2–7	Germany
Al Hammadi 63'; Mubarak 73'	Report	Westermann 29'; Gómez 35', 45', 47', 90'; Trochowski 39'; Jumaa 62' (o.g.)

Al-Maktoum Stadium, Dubai
Attendance: 7,000
Referee: Naser Darwish (Jordan)

=== FIFA World Cup 2010 qualifiers ===
Germany was drawn into Group 4 of UEFA qualification for the 2010 FIFA World Cup.

6 September 2008
20:45 UTC+2

Liechtenstein	0–6	Germany
	Report	Podolski 21', 48'; Rolfes 64'; Schweinsteiger 65'; Hitzlsperger 75'; Westermann 86'

Rheinpark Stadion, Vaduz
Attendance: 6,021
Referee: Duarte Gomes (Portugal)

10 September 2008
20:35 UTC+3

Finland	3–3	Germany
Johansson 33'; Väyrynen 43'; Sjölund 53'	Report	Klose 38', 45', 83'

Helsinki Olympic Stadium, Helsinki
Attendance: 37,150
Referee: Viktor Kassai (Hungary)

11 October 2008
20:45 UTC+2

Germany	2–1	Russia
Podolski 9'; Ballack 28'	Report	Arshavin 51'

Signal Iduna Park, Dortmund
Attendance: 65,607
Referee: Peter Fröjdfeldt (Sweden)

15 October 2008
20:45 UTC+2

Germany	1–0	Wales
Trochowski 72'	Report

Borussia-Park, Mönchengladbach
Attendance: 44,500
Referee: Laurent Duhamel (France)

28 March 2009
20:00 UTC+1

Germany	4–0	Liechtenstein
Ballack 4'; Jansen 9'; Schweinsteiger 48'; Podolski 50'	Report

Zentralstadion, Leipzig
Attendance: 43,368
Referee: Igor Ishchenko (Ukraine)

1 April 2009
19:45 UTC+1

Wales	0–2	Germany
	Report	Ballack 11'; Williams 48' (o.g.)

Millennium Stadium, Cardiff
Attendance: 26,064
Referee: Terje Hauge (Norway)

== Women's national team ==
=== Friendly matches ===
17 July 2008
18:00 UTC+2

Germany	3–0	England
Smisek 15'; Prinz 55'; Behringer 71' (pen.)	Report

Generali Sportpark, Unterhaching
Attendance: 9,185
Referee: Christine Beck (Magstadt)

23 July 2009
18:00 UTC+1

Norway	2–0	Germany
M. Knutsen 42'; G. Knutsen 74'	Report

Komplett.no Arena, Sandefjord
Attendance: 200
Referee: Eva Ödlund (Sweden)

22 April 2009
18:15 UTC+2

Germany	1–1	Brazil
Mittag 24'	Report	Maurine 36'

Commerzbank-Arena, Frankfurt am Main
Attendance: 44,825
Referee: Jenny Palmqvist (Sweden)

=== Olympic football tournament ===
Germany ended the Olympic football tournament with the bronze medal.

Group stage

6 August 2008
17:00 UTC+8

Germany	0–0	Brazil
	(Report)

Shenyang Olympic Stadium, Shenyang
Attendance: 20,703
Referee: Kari Seitz (USA)

9 August 2008
17:00 UTC+8

Nigeria	0–1	Germany
	(Report)	Stegemann 65'

Shenyang Olympic Stadium, Shenyang
Attendance: 19,266
Referee: Jenny Palmqvist (Sweden)

12 August 2008
17:00 UTC+8

North Korea	0–1	Germany
	(Report)	Mittag 86'

Tianjin Olympic Center Stadium, Tianjin
Attendance: 12,387
Referee: Dianne Ferreira-James (Guyana)

Quarterfinal

15 August 2008
21:00 UTC+8

Sweden	0–2 (a.e.t.)	Germany
	(Report)	Garefrekes 104'; Laudehr 115'

Shenyang Olympic Stadium, Shenyang
Attendance: 17,209
Referee: Dagmar Damkova (Czech Republic)

Semifinal

18 August 2008
18:00 UTC+8

Brazil	4–1	Germany
Formiga 43'; Cristiane 49', 76'; Marta 53'	(Report)	Prinz 10'

Shanghai Stadium, Shanghai
Attendance: 26,976
Referee: Hong Eun-ah (Korea Republic)

Bronze medal match

21 August 2008
18:00 UTC+8

Germany	2–0	Japan
Bajramaj 68', 87'	(Report)

Workers Stadium, Beijing
Attendance: 49,285
Referee: Estella Alvares (Argentina)

=== UEFA Women's Euro 2009 qualifiers ===
Germany had already qualified for the UEFA Women's Euro 2009 before the start of the season. After the last qualifying match, the team finished with eight wins from eight matches in Group 4.

1 October 2008
16:00 UTC+2

Switzerland	0–3	Germany
	Report	Garefrekes 20'; Behringer 33'; Smisek 76'

Schützenmatte, Basel
Attendance: 3,020
Referee: Maaren Olander (Estonia)

=== 2009 Algarve Cup ===
Germany finished the 2009 Algarve Cup as fourth-placed team after losing against Denmark in the match for third place.

Group stage

4 March 2009
13:15 UTC+0

Germany	2–0	Finland
Behringer 69'; Garefrekes 90'	Report

Municipal Stadium, Albufeira
Attendance: 100
Referee: Chenard (Canada)

6 March 2009
13:15 UTC+0

Germany	3–0	China
Garefrekes 38', 67'; Kulig 58'	Report

Municipal Stadium, Albufeira
Attendance: 200
Referee: Gaal (Hungary)

9 March 2009
13:15 UTC+0

Sweden	3–2	Germany
Fischer 28'; Schelin 36', 38'	Report	Grings 77'; Kulig 83'

Estádio Algarve, Faro
Attendance: 200
Referee: Melksham (Australia)

Match for third place

11 March 2009
13:15 UTC+0

Germany	0–1	Denmark
	Report	Rydahl Bukh 42'

Estádio Algarve, Faro
Attendance: 200
Referee: Jenny Palmqvist (Sweden)

== Honours ==
Men
Competition	Winner	Details
Bundesliga	VfL Wolfsburg	2008–09 Bundesliga
2. Bundesliga	SC Freiburg	2008–09 2. Bundesliga
3. Liga	1. FC Union Berlin	2008–09 3. Liga
DFB-Pokal	SV Werder Bremen	2008–09 DFB-Pokal; Beat Bayer 04 Leverkusen 1–0
Women
Competition	Winner	Details
Bundesliga	1. FFC Turbine Potsdam	2008–09 Bundesliga
2. Bundesliga	Tennis Borussia Berlin (North)	2008–09 2. Bundesliga
2. Bundesliga	1. FC Saarbrücken (South)	2008–09 2. Bundesliga
DFB-Pokal	FCR 2001 Duisburg	2008–09 DFB-Pokal; Beat 1. FFC Turbine Potsdam 7–0

== League tables ==
=== Men ===
==== Bundesliga ====
Pos	Team	Pld	W	D	L	GF	GA	GD	Pts	Qualification or relegation
1	VfL Wolfsburg (C)	34	21	6	7	80	41	+39	69	Qualification to Champions League group stage
2	Bayern Munich	34	20	7	7	71	42	+29	67	Qualification to Champions League group stage
3	VfB Stuttgart	34	19	7	8	63	43	+20	64	Qualification to Champions League play-off round
4	Hertha BSC	34	19	6	9	48	41	+7	63	Qualification to Europa League play-off round
5	Hamburger SV	34	19	4	11	49	47	+2	61	Qualification to Europa League third qualifying round
6	Borussia Dortmund	34	15	14	5	60	37	+23	59	
7	1899 Hoffenheim	34	15	10	9	63	49	+14	55	
8	Schalke 04	34	14	8	12	47	35	+12	50	
9	Bayer Leverkusen	34	14	7	13	59	46	+13	49	
10	Werder Bremen (Note: Werder Bremen qualified for the play-off round of the UEFA Europa League by winning the 2008–09 DFB-Pokal.)	34	12	9	13	64	50	+14	45	Qualification to Europa League play-off round
11	Hannover 96	34	10	10	14	49	69	−20	40	
12	1. FC Köln	34	11	6	17	35	50	−15	39	
13	Eintracht Frankfurt	34	8	9	17	39	60	−21	33	
14	VfL Bochum	34	7	11	16	39	55	−16	32	
15	Borussia Mönchengladbach	34	8	7	19	39	62	−23	31	
16	Energie Cottbus (R)	34	8	6	20	30	57	−27	30	Qualification to relegation play-offs
17	Karlsruher SC (R)	34	8	5	21	30	54	−24	29	Relegation to 2. Bundesliga
18	Arminia Bielefeld (R)	34	4	16	14	29	56	−27	28	Relegation to 2. Bundesliga

Source: kicker (in German)
Rules for classification: 1) points; 2) goal difference; 3) number of goals scored.
(C) Champions; (R) Relegated

==== 2. Bundesliga ====
Pos	Team	Pld	W	D	L	GF	GA	GD	Pts	Promotion, qualification or relegation
1	SC Freiburg (C, P)	34	21	5	8	60	36	+24	68	Promotion to Bundesliga
2	Mainz 05 (P)	34	18	9	7	62	37	+25	63	Promotion to Bundesliga
3	1. FC Nürnberg (O, P)	34	16	12	6	51	29	+22	60	Qualification for promotion play-offs
4	Alemannia Aachen	34	16	8	10	58	38	+20	56	
5	Greuther Fürth	34	16	8	10	60	46	+14	56	
6	MSV Duisburg	34	14	13	7	56	36	+20	55	
7	1. FC Kaiserslautern	34	15	7	12	53	48	+5	52	
8	FC St. Pauli	34	14	6	14	52	59	−7	48	
9	Rot-Weiß Oberhausen	34	11	9	14	35	54	−19	42	
10	Rot Weiss Ahlen	34	11	8	15	38	57	−19	41	
11	FC Augsburg	34	10	10	14	43	46	−3	40	
12	1860 Munich	34	9	12	13	44	46	−2	39	
13	Hansa Rostock	34	8	14	12	52	53	−1	38	
14	TuS Koblenz	34	11	8	15	47	57	−10	38 (Note: Due to licensing irregularities in the 2007–08 season, TuS Koblenz started with a three point deduction.)	
15	FSV Frankfurt	34	9	11	14	34	47	−13	38	
16	VfL Osnabrück (R)	34	8	12	14	41	60	−19	36	Qualification for relegation play-offs
17	FC Ingolstadt (R)	34	7	10	17	38	54	−16	31	Relegation to 3. Liga
18	Wehen Wiesbaden (R)	34	5	12	17	28	49	−21	27	Relegation to 3. Liga

Source: kicker
Rules for classification: 1) points; 2) goal difference; 3) number of goals scored.
(C) Champions; (O) Play-off winners; (P) Promoted; (R) Relegated

==== 3. Liga ====
1. FC Union Berlin were the dominating team in the first season of the newly created third tier of the German league pyramid, winning the championship and promotion to the 2. Bundesliga with four matches to play. The remaining one-and-a-half promotion spots were contested between Fortuna Düsseldorf, Paderborn, and Unterhaching until the last matchday. Since all three teams won their last matches, Düsseldorf gained direct promotion, while Paderborn were to face 2. Bundesliga sides Osnabrück in the 2. Bundesliga relegation playoffs. The third-placed team eventually completed the promotional trio by beating Osnabrück 2–0 on aggregate.

Stuttgarter Kickers were struggling both on and off the pitch and consequently relegated to the fourth-level Regionalliga. After being on bottom of the table for most of the season, the choice not to return a loan from the German FA resulted in a three-point deduction, which effectively ended their season. The second relegated team, VfR Aalen, fell victim to its number of drawn matches. Fifteen of them, paired with only eight wins, resulted in only 39 points, which proved to be too few to survive.

Wacker Burghausen would originally have been the third team to be relegated. However, they were spared after Kickers Emden, who were a promotion contender for three-quarters of the season, had to return their license over financial problems. Since Emden did not obtain a license for the Regionalliga, they entered the fifth-tier Oberliga Niedersachsen for the 2009–10 season.

Pos	Team	Pld	W	D	L	GF	GA	GD	Pts	Promotion, qualification or relegation
1	Union Berlin (C, P)	38	22	12	4	59	23	+36	78	Promotion to 2. Bundesliga and qualification for DFB-Pokal
2	Fortuna Düsseldorf (P)	38	20	9	9	54	33	+21	69	Promotion to 2. Bundesliga and qualification for DFB-Pokal
3	SC Paderborn 07 (O, P)	38	20	8	10	68	38	+30	68	Qualification to promotion play-offs and DFB-Pokal
4	SpVgg Unterhaching	38	20	7	11	57	46	+11	67	Qualification for DFB-Pokal
5	Bayern Munich II (Note: Reserve teams are ineligible for promotion or DFB-Pokal qualification.)	38	14	17	7	54	38	+16	59	
6	Kickers Emden (Note: Kickers Emden retracted their application for a 3. Liga license for the 2009–10 season and were automatically relegated. SV Wacker Burghausen took their spot.) (R)	38	16	11	11	45	44	+1	59	Relegation to Oberliga Niedersachsen
7	Kickers Offenbach	38	12	16	10	40	35	+5	52	
8	SV Sandhausen	38	12	14	12	58	52	+6	50	
9	Dynamo Dresden	38	13	11	14	46	46	0	50	
10	Rot-Weiß Erfurt	38	13	11	14	46	48	−2	50	
11	VfB Stuttgart II	38	13	10	15	61	50	+11	49	
12	Erzgebirge Aue	38	12	12	14	43	43	0	48	
13	Eintracht Braunschweig	38	12	9	17	46	51	−5	45	
14	Wuppertaler SV	38	11	12	15	36	45	−9	45	
15	Jahn Regensburg	38	11	12	15	37	51	−14	45	
16	Carl Zeiss Jena	38	10	11	17	41	59	−18	41	
17	Werder Bremen II	38	10	10	18	49	58	−9	40	
18	Wacker Burghausen	38	10	10	18	40	65	−25	40	
19	VfR Aalen (R)	38	8	15	15	38	60	−22	39	Relegation to Regionalliga
20	Stuttgarter Kickers (Note: Stuttgarter Kickers received a three-point deduction due to failed debt repayments to the German Football Association.) (R)	38	7	11	20	38	71	−33	29	Relegation to Regionalliga

Source: www.kicker.de (German)
Rules for classification: 1) points; 2) goal difference; 3) number of goals scored.
(C) Champions; (O) Play-off winners; (P) Promoted; (R) Relegated

=== Women ===
==== Bundesliga ====
Turbine Potsdam emerged victorious in a very tight championship race, beating runners-up Bayern Munich by just a single goal. A 4–0 defeat against third-placed FCR Duisburg just days before the last matchday of the season proved to be costly for the team from Munich. Long-time successive champion 1. FFC Frankfurt had to battle through a couple of injuries to key players, including Birgit Prinz, and thus finished in fourth place.

The first three teams qualified for the newly created UEFA Women's Champions League, although Duisburg did only so on virtue of their UEFA Women's Cup win. Both Potsdam and Duisburg directly entered the main round of the competition, while Bayern Munich competed in a qualification tournament.

On the bottom side of the table, TSV Crailsheim never had a chance to be competitive, and successfully ended the season with a mere five points in last place. The second relegation place was contested between SC Bad Neuenahr and Borussia Friedenstal. The team from southwestern Germany eventually prevailed and sent Friedenstal back to the 2. Bundesliga after just one year in the top flight.

Pos	Team	Pld	W	D	L	GF	GA	GD	Pts	Qualification or relegation
1	Turbine Potsdam (C)	22	17	3	2	67	19	+48	54	2009–10 UEFA Champions League round of 32
2	Bayern Munich	22	17	3	2	69	22	+47	54	2009–10 UEFA Champions League qualifying round
3	FCR 2001 Duisburg	22	17	2	3	86	20	+66	53	2009–10 UEFA Champions League round of 32 (Note: FCR 2001 Duisburg won the 2008–09 UEFA Women's Cup therefore qualify for the 2009–10 UEFA Women's Champions League.)
4	1. FFC Frankfurt	22	14	3	5	58	25	+33	45	
5	Essen-Schönebeck	22	9	3	10	46	39	+7	30	
6	Hamburger SV	22	9	2	11	53	49	+4	29	
7	SC Freiburg	22	9	2	11	36	53	−17	29	
8	VfL Wolfsburg	22	8	3	11	53	48	+5	27	
9	FF USV Jena	22	7	2	13	32	56	−24	23	
10	SC 07 Bad Neuenahr	22	5	3	14	26	74	−48	18	
11	HSV Borussia Friedenstal (R)	22	4	2	16	23	79	−56	14	Relegation to 2009–10 2. Bundesliga
12	TSV Crailsheim (R)	22	1	2	19	14	79	−65	5	Relegation to 2009–10 2. Bundesliga

Source: kicker.de
Rules for classification: 1) points; 2) goal difference; 3) number of goals scored.
(C) Champions; (R) Relegated

==== 2. Bundesliga ====
The northern group was won by Tennis Borussia Berlin. SG Lütgendortmund had to leave the second tier again after just one season. They were accompanied by 1. FC Union Berlin.

The southern group saw a close finish between 1. FC Saarbrücken and VfL Sindelfingen. Saarbrücken eventually prevailed and made their immediate return to the top flight. Wattenscheid 09, who were also relegated from the Bundesliga last season, finished fourth. On the bottom end of the table, SV Dirmingen were relegated with the worst record of all 24 2. Bundesliga teams. They were joined by Viktoria Jägersburg, who made their immediate return to the Regionalliga.

The relegation playoffs featured a match-up between Mellendorf and Löchgau. Both teams were promoted to the second level one year ago. Löchgau eventually retrieved their spot with a 2–1 aggregate victory, sending Mellendorf back to the Regionalliga.

===== North =====
Pos	Team	Pld	W	D	L	GF	GA	GD	Pts	Qualification or relegation
1	Tennis Borussia Berlin (C)	22	19	2	1	59	18	+41	59	Promotion to 2009–10 Bundesliga
2	Turbine Potsdam II	22	16	2	4	56	27	+29	50	
3	1. FC Lokomotive Leipzig	22	14	2	6	45	27	+18	44	
4	FC Gütersloh 2000	22	12	3	7	43	27	+16	39	
5	Hamburger SV	22	10	5	7	44	30	+14	35	
6	FFC Oldesloe 2000	22	10	3	9	23	27	−4	33	
7	Holstein Kiel	22	8	3	11	27	37	−10	27	
8	Blau-Weiß Hohen Neuendorf	22	7	3	12	29	41	−12	24	
9	SV Victoria Gersten	22	6	5	11	31	35	−4	23	
10	Mellendorfer TV (R)	22	5	2	15	22	53	−31	17	Qualification for the relegation play-off
11	SG Lütgendortmund (R)	22	4	3	15	20	45	−25	15	Relegation to 2009–10 Regionalliga
12	1. FC Union Berlin (R)	22	3	3	16	22	54	−32	12	Relegation to 2009–10 Regionalliga

Updated to match(es) played on 24 May 2009. Source: kicker (in German)
Rules for classification: 1) points; 2) goal difference; 3) number of goals scored.
(C) Champions; (R) Relegated

===== South =====
Pos	Team	Pld	W	D	L	GF	GA	GD	Pts	Qualification or relegation
1	1. FC Saarbrücken (C)	22	18	3	1	81	10	+71	57	Promotion to 2009–10 Bundesliga
2	VfL Sindelfingen	22	18	1	3	60	16	+44	55	
3	FCR 2001 Duisburg II	22	14	2	6	51	28	+23	44	
4	SG Wattenscheid 09	22	13	3	6	44	33	+11	42	
5	FFC Frankfurt II	22	12	3	7	47	29	+18	39	
6	ASV Hagsfeld	22	8	6	8	42	39	+3	30	
7	Bayer Leverkusen	22	6	7	9	47	40	+7	25	
8	SC Sand	22	6	6	10	37	47	−10	24	
9	FFC Wacker München	22	7	3	12	28	45	−17	24	
10	FV Löchgau	22	5	2	15	38	63	−25	17	Qualification for the relegation pla-yoff
11	FSV Viktoria Jägersburg (R)	22	4	2	16	25	78	−53	14	Relegation to 2009–10 Regionalliga
12	SV Dirmingen (R)	22	1	2	19	20	92	−72	5	Relegation to 2009–10 Regionalliga

Updated to match(es) played on 24 May 2009. Source: kicker (in German)
Rules for classification: 1) points; 2) goal difference; 3) number of goals scored.
(C) Champions; (R) Relegated

=== Movements for the 2009–10 season ===
Men
Competition	Promoted	Relegated
Bundesliga	N/A	Energie Cottbus (via playoffs), Karlsruher SC, Arminia Bielefeld
2. Bundesliga	SC Freiburg, 1. FSV Mainz 05, 1. FC Nürnberg (via playoffs)	VfL Osnabrück (via playoffs), FC Ingolstadt 04, SV Wehen Wiesbaden
3. Liga	1. FC Union Berlin, Fortuna Düsseldorf, SC Paderborn 07 (via playoffs)	VfR Aalen, Stuttgarter Kickers, Kickers Emden (withdrawn)
Women
Competition	Promoted	Relegated
Bundesliga	N/A	HSV Borussia Friedenstal, TSV Crailsheim
2. Bundesliga	Tennis Borussia Berlin, 1. FC Saarbrücken	Mellendorfer TV (via playoffs), SG Lütgendortmund, FSV Viktoria Jägersburg, 1. FC Union Berlin, SV Dirmingen

== Retirements ==
The following is a list of retired players who ended their career at the end of the 2008–09 season. All retirements are, unless noted otherwise, listed in the 2009 special edition of kicker magazine. The club given in parentheses is the last club of the retired player.

- End of season – Alexander Bade (Arminia Bielefeld)
- End of season – Frank Baumann (Werder Bremen)
- End of season – Ralf Bucher (SpVgg Unterhaching)
- End of season – Francisco Copado (SpVgg Unterhaching)
- End of season – Christian Fiedler (Hertha BSC)
- End of season – Dennis Grassow (Jahn Regensburg)
- End of season – Marijan Kovačević (VfB Stuttgart)
- End of season – Tobias Rau (Arminia Bielefeld)
- End of season – Bernd Schneider (Bayer Leverkusen)
- End of season – Markus Schroth (1860 Munich)
- End of season – Michael Tarnat (Hannover 96)
- End of season – Marco Vorbeck (FC Augsburg)

== Deaths ==
- 12 July 2008 – Reinhard Fabisch, 57, coach for the national teams of Zimbabwe, Kenya and Benin. Fabisch died from cancer.
- 13 July 2008 – Rudolf Nafziger, 62, European Cup Winners' Cup winner with Bayern Munich in 1967. He also played for Swiss club FC St. Gallen, Hannover 96 and Austrian sides LASK Linz. Nafziger earned one cap for West Germany.
- 24 August 2008 – Josef Marx, 73, defender for SV Sodingen and Karlsruher SC. He earned one cap for West Germany.
- 29 August 2008 – Heinz Wewers, 81, midfielder for Rot-Weiß Essen. Wewers earned twelve caps for West Germany.
- 31 August 2008 – Albert Sing, 91, Stuttgarter Kickers player and manager of various German and Swiss teams. He earned nine caps for Germany.
- 19 October 2008 – Willi Kraus, 65, striker for FC Schalke 04, Tennis Borussia Berlin, and Eintracht Gelsenkirchen.
- 27 October 2008 – Heinz Krügel, 87, player for SG Planitz and coach of the East Germany national team and 1. FC Magdeburg. Krügel won the UEFA Cup Winners' Cup with Magdeburg in 1974.
- 25 November 2008 – Günter Männig, 80, referee. Männig was on the FIFA list between 1962 and 1978 and was assigned to 92 matches in that span. He also worked 264 matches in the DDR-Oberliga and the FDGB-Pokal.
- 27 December 2008 – Alfred Pfaff, 82, midfielder for Eintracht Frankfurt. Pfaff was part of the German 1954 World Cup team. He earned seven caps for West Germany.
- 12 January 2009 – Michael Polywka, 65, player for FC Carl Zeiss Jena, Eintracht Braunschweig and Hannover 96.
- 29 January 2009 – Willi Köchling, 84, player for Rot-Weiß Essen. He earned one cap for West Germany.
- 28 April 2009 – Fritz Gödicke, 89, coach of the East Germany national team between May 1958 and August 1959.
