= Nadine Kraus =

German footballer

Personal information
- Full name: Nadine Kraus
- Date of birth: 14 February 1988 (age 38)
- Place of birth: Weiden in der Oberpfalz, West Germany
- Height: 1.74 m (5 ft 8 1/2 in)
- Position: Midfielder

Team information
- Current team: 1. FFC Recklinghausen

Youth career
- 1991–2001: TSV Pressath
- 2000–2002: TUS/DJK Grafenwöhr
- 2002–2005: SC Regensburg

Senior career*
Years	Team	Apps	(Gls)
2005–2007	SC Regensburg	33	(14)
2007–2009	1. FC Saarbrücken	40	(7)
2009–2011	SG Essen-Schönebeck	35	(1)
2011–2014	FF USV Jena	18	(0)
2012–2014	→ FF USV Jena II	13	(1)
2015–2016	VfL Bochum	29	(2)
2015–2016	→ VfL Bochum II		
2016–	1. FFC Recklinghausen		

International career^{‡}
2004	Germany U17	5	(0)
2007	Germany U19	1	(0)
Medal record
SC Regensburg
Winner	Bayernliga	2005–06
1. FC Saarbrücken
Runner-up	DFB-Pokal	2007–08
Winner	2. Bundesliga	2008–09
1. FFC Recklinghausen
Runner-up	Verbandsliga Westfalen	2017–18
Winner	Verbandsliga Westfalen	2018–19
- * Club domestic league appearances and goals as of 1 August 2019 ‡ National team caps and goals as of 8 July 2010

Nadine Kraus (born 14 February 1988) is a German footballer who plays as a midfielder for 1. FFC Recklinghausen. She studied at Friedrich Schiller University during her career.

== Career ==
=== Statistics ===
As of 1 August 2019

Club	Season	League			Cup		League Cup		Total	
Club	Season	Division	Apps	Goals	Apps	Goals	Apps	Goals	Apps	Goals
SC Regensburg	2005–06	Bayernliga	13	6			—			
SC Regensburg	2006–07	2. Bundesliga	20	8			—			
SC Regensburg	Total		33	14			0	0		
1. FC Saarbrücken	2007–08	Bundesliga	21	6			2 (Note: Appearances in the 2007 Bundesliga Cup.)	1		
1. FC Saarbrücken	2008–09	2. Bundesliga	19	1			—			
1. FC Saarbrücken	Total		40	7			2	1		
SG Essen-Schönebeck	2009–10	Bundesliga	22	0	4	0	—		26	0
SG Essen-Schönebeck	2010–11	Bundesliga	13	1	3	0	3 (Note: Appearances in the 2011 Bundesliga Cup.)	0	19	1
SG Essen-Schönebeck	Total		35	1	7	0	3	0	45	1
FF USV Jena	2011–12	Bundesliga	8	0	2	0	—		10	0
FF USV Jena	2012–13	Bundesliga	10	0	2	1	—		2	1
FF USV Jena	2013–14	Bundesliga	0	0	0	0	—		0	0
FF USV Jena	Total		18	0	4	1	0	0	22	1
FF USV Jena II	2011–12	2. Bundesliga	5	1	—		—		5	1
FF USV Jena II	2012–13	2. Bundesliga	6	0	—		—		6	0
FF USV Jena II	2013–14	2. Bundesliga	2	0	—		—		2	0
FF USV Jena II	Total		13	1	0	0	0	0	13	1
VfL Bochum	2014–15	2. Bundesliga	6	0	0	0	—		6	0
VfL Bochum	2015–16	Regionalliga West	23	2	1	0	—		24	2
VfL Bochum	Total		29	2	1	0	0	0	30	2
VfL Bochum II	2014–15	Regionalliga West	4	0	—		—		4	0
VfL Bochum II	2015–16	Verbandsliga Westfalen			—		—			
VfL Bochum II	Total				0	0	0	0		
1. FFC Recklinghausen	2016–17	Verbandsliga Westfalen			—		—			
1. FFC Recklinghausen	2017–18	Verbandsliga Westfalen			—		—			
1. FFC Recklinghausen	2018–19	Verbandsliga Westfalen			—		—			
1. FFC Recklinghausen	2019–20	Regionalliga West	0	0	—		—		0	0
1. FFC Recklinghausen	Total				0	0	0	0		
Career total							3	0		
