= 2006–07 DFB-Pokal Frauen =

Tournament details
- Country: Germany
- Teams: 55

Final positions
- Champions: FFC Frankfurt
- Runners-up: FCR 2001 Duisburg

Tournament statistics
- Matches played: 55
- Goals scored: 327 (5.95 per match)

The Frauen DFB-Pokal 2006–07 was the 27th season of the cup competition, Germany's second-most important title in women's football. The first round of the tournament was held on 2–3 September 2006. In the final which was held in Berlin on 26 May 2007 FFC Frankfurt defeated FCR 2001 Duisburg 5–2 on penalties, thus claiming their sixth title.

== 1st round ==
2 September 2006
ASV Hagsfeld	1 – 2	1. FC Saarbrücken
3 September 2006
FC Finnentrop	1 – 6	SuS Timmel
SG Lütgendortmund	1 – 0	FFV Neubrandenburg
SV Hafen Rostock	0 – 8	SV Victoria Gersten
1. FFV Erfurt	7 – 8	SC Sand	(pso)
VfL Kommern	0 – 4	Wacker München
SV Dirmingen	1 – 0	Erzgebirge Aue
VfL Oythe	0 – 8	FC Gütersloh 2000
BTS Neustadt	0 – 16	VfL Wolfsburg
Union Berlin	3 – 4	Holstein Kiel
MTV Wolfenbüttel	1 – 5	Brauweiler Pulheim
FFC Oldesloe	7 – 8	Wattenscheid 09	(pso)
SV Rot-Weiss Flatow	0 – 9	Tennis Borussia Berlin
Hallescher FC	0 – 4	TSV Jahn Calden
TGM SV Jügesheim	3 – 1	TuS Niederkirchen
FV Löchgau	0 – 10	TSV Crailsheim
TuS Ahrbach	1 – 5	FF USV Jena
VfR Engen	5 – 7	Karlsruher SC	(pso)
FSV Jägersburg	0 – 5	VfL Sindelfingen
SC Siegelbach	6 – 7	TuS Köln rrh.	(pso)
TSV Niendorf	0 – 1	Herforder SV Borussia Friedenstal
SV Weinberg	6 – 5^{*}	SC Regensburg	(pso)
8 September 2006
Ratinger SV 04/19	1 – 4	Lokomotive Leipzig

^{*} The game was replayed due to a referee's mistake in the penalty shootout.

=== Replay ===
13 September 2006
SV Weinberg	3 – 1	SC Regensburg

== 2nd round ==
The best nine teams from the 2005–06 Bundesliga season entered the competition in this round. Defending champion Turbine Potsdam had a quick exit from the competition, losing their initial match at home against FCR 2001 Duisburg.

22 October 2006
Hamburg	5 – 0	Wattenscheid 09
Lokomotive Leipzig	0 – 5	Essen-Schönebeck
VfL Wolfsburg	4 – 1	Heike Rheine
FC Gütersloh 2000	9 – 0	TSV Jahn Calden
SV Weinberg	0 – 3	1. FC Saarbrücken
FFC Frankfurt	4 – 0	Brauweiler Pulheim
Bayern Munich	2 – 1	SC 07 Bad Neuenahr
TSV Crailsheim	6 – 0	Wacker München
SG Lütgendortmund	2 – 1	SuS Timmel	(aet)
Turbine Potsdam	2 – 3	FCR 2001 Duisburg
SV Victoria Gersten	2 – 1	Holstein Kiel
Herforder SV Borussia Friedenstal	1 – 2	Tennis Borussia Berlin
SV Dirmingen	1 – 3	SC Sand	(aet)
TGM SV Jügesheim	2 – 4	FF USV Jena	(aet)
SC Freiburg	4 – 2	VfL Sindelfingen
TuS Köln rrh.	4 – 0	Karlsruher SC

== 3rd Round ==
19 November 2006
FF USV Jena	1 – 4	1. FC Saarbrücken
VfL Wolfsburg	5 – 4	Bayern Munich	(pso)
SG Lütgendortmund	1 – 3	Tennis Borussia Berlin	(aet)
FC Gütersloh 2000	1 – 3	SC Sand	(aet)
TSV Crailsheim	1 – 0	SC Freiburg
Hamburg	0 – 3	FFC Frankfurt
Essen-Schönebeck	10 – 0	TuS Köln rrh.
SV Victoria Gersten	0 – 6	FCR 2001 Duisburg

== Quarter-finals ==
17 December 2006
FFC Frankfurt	9 – 0	SC Sand
TSV Crailsheim	0 – 4	Essen-Schönebeck
Tennis Borussia Berlin	1 – 2	1. FC Saarbrücken
VfL Wolfsburg	0 – 2	FCR 2001 Duisburg

== Semi-finals ==
8 April 2007
Essen-Schönebeck	1 – 5	FCR 2001 Duisburg
FFC Frankfurt	4 – 1	1. FC Saarbrücken

== Final ==
26 May 2007
16:45 (CEST)

1. FFC Frankfurt	1 – 1	FCR 2001 Duisburg
Lingor 3' (pen.)		Fuss 45'
Penalties
Prinz (penalty scored) Smisek (penalty scored); Hansen (penalty scored) Wimbersky (penalty scored)	4 – 1	Martini (penalty missed) Sonja Fuss (penalty scored) Hanebeck (penalty missed)

Olympic Stadium (Berlin)
Attendance: 5,000
Referee: Moiken Jung (Worms)

1. FFC FRANKFURT:
GK	(Germany) Ursula Holl
DF	(Germany) Judith Affeld	(substituted off) 71'
DF	(Germany) Steffi Jones
DF	(Germany) Tina Wunderlich
MF	(Germany) Kerstin Garefrekes
MF	(Germany) Renate Lingor	(substituted off) 56'
MF	(Germany) Saskia Bartusiak
MF	(Germany) Pia Wunderlich	(substituted off) 80'
FW	(Germany) Sandra Smisek
FW	(Germany) Birgit Prinz
FW	(Germany) Petra Wimbersky
Substitutes:
DF	(Germany) Katrin Kliehm	(substituted on) 71'
MF	(Germany) Meike Weber	(substituted on) 56'
MF	(Denmark) Louise Hansen	(substituted on) 80'
Manager:
(Germany) Hans-Jürgen Tritschoks

FCR 2001 DUISBURG:
GK	1	(Germany) Kathrin Längert	(substituted off) 90'
DF	(Germany) Anne van Bonn
DF	(Germany) Annike Krahn
DF	(Germany) Sonja Fuss
DF	(Germany) Corina Schröder
MF	(Germany) Vanessa Martini
MF	(Germany) Fatmire Bajramaj
MF	(Germany) Patricia Hanebeck
MF	(Germany) Nicola Bender	Booked
FW	(Germany) Simone Laudehr	(substituted off) 12'
FW	(Germany) Inka Grings
Substitutes:
GK	(Germany) Lena Hohlfeld	(substituted on) 90'
FW	(Germany) Verena Hagedorn	(substituted on) 12' (substituted off) 81'
FW	(Germany) Viola Odebrecht	(substituted on) 81'
Manager:
(Germany) Thomas Obliers

MATCH RULES

- 90 minutes.
- 30 minutes of extra-time if necessary, except in the final.
- Penalty shootout if scores still level.
- Seven named substitutes
- Maximum of 3 substitutions.
