= 2005–06 2. Frauen-Bundesliga =

Season of the second class in German women's football

The 2nd Fußball-Bundesliga (women) 2005–06 was the 2nd season of the 2. Fußball-Bundesliga (women), Germany's second football league. It began on 14 August 2005 and ended on 5 June 2006.

== Group North ==
=== Final standings ===
Pos	Team	P	W	D	L	F	A	GD	Pts
1	VfL Wolfsburg (A)	22	17	4	1	80	21	+59	55
2	FC Gütersloh 2000	22	16	3	3	51	17	+34	51
3	Tennis Borussia Berlin	22	13	4	5	54	25	+29	43
4	SG Wattenscheid 09	22	13	2	7	68	38	+30	41
5	SV Victoria Gersten	22	11	4	7	49	36	+13	37
6	Holstein Kiel (N)	22	9	6	7	34	40	-8	33
7	1. FFC Turbine Potsdam II	22	9	4	9	47	38	+9	31
8	TSV Jahn Calden	22	8	3	11	34	41	-7	27
9	FFV Neubrandenburg (N)	22	7	2	13	36	49	-13	23
10	SuS Timmel	22	4	5	13	20	55	-35	17
11	SG Lütgendortmund	22	5	1	16	33	58	-25	16
12	MTV Wolfenbüttel	22	0	2	20	7	95	-88	2

	Will be promoted to the Fußball-Bundesliga (women)
	Will be relegated to the new Fußball-Regionalliga (women)
(N)	Promoted from the Regionalliga last season
(A)	Relegated from the Bundesliga last season

Pld = Matches played; W = Matches won; D = Matches drawn; L = Matches lost; GF = Goals for; GA = Goals against; GD = Goal difference; Pts = Points

== Group South ==
=== Final standings ===
Pos	Team	P	W	D	L	F	A	GD	Pts
1.	TSV Crailsheim (A)	22	18	3	1	61	8	+53	57
2.	1. FC Saarbrücken	22	18	2	2	78	15	+63	56
3.	FF USV Jena	22	15	3	4	72	36	+36	48
4.	TuS Köln rrh. (N)	22	13	5	4	49	20	+29	44
5.	TuS Niederkirchen (N)	22	12	3	7	56	46	+10	39
6.	SC Sand	22	9	4	9	25	32	-7	31
7.	1.FFC Frankfurt II	22	8	4	10	39	46	-7	28
8.	FFC Wacker München	22	5	7	10	31	32	-1	22
9.	FC Erzgebirge Aue	22	5	4	13	22	37	-15	19
10.	VfL Sindelfingen II (N) ^{*}	22	5	3	14	22	60	-38	18
11.	Karlsruher SC	22	2	1	19	19	87	-68	7
12.	FSV Viktoria Jägersburg	22	1	3	18	14	68	-54	6

^{*} VfL Singelfingen was relegated to the 2. Bundesliga therefore Sindelfingen II was automatically relegated to the Regionalliga instead of Karlsruher SC.

	Will be promoted to the Fußball-Bundesliga (women)
	Will be relegated to the new Fußball-Regionalliga (women)
(N)	Promoted from the Regionalliga last season
(A)	Relegated from the Bundesliga last season

Pld = Matches played; W = Matches won; D = Matches drawn; L = Matches lost; GF = Goals for; GA = Goals against; GD = Goal difference; Pts = Points
