= Romina Holz =

German footballer

Personal information
- Full name: Romina Holz
- Date of birth: 28 January 1988 (age 38)
- Place of birth: Saarbrücken, West Germany
- Height: 1.73 m (5 ft 8 in)
- Position: Goalkeeper

Youth career
- 1998–2004: 1. FC Saarbrücken

Senior career*
Years	Team	Apps	(Gls)
2004–2009	1. FC Saarbrücken	84	(0)
2009–2010	SC 07 Bad Neuenahr	19	(0)
2010–2011	1. FC Saarbrücken	15	(0)
- * Club domestic league appearances and goals as of 21:40, 21 June 2010 (UTC)

Romina Holz (born 28 January 1988) is a former German footballer. She most played for 1. FC Saarbrücken.

== Honours ==
=== 1. FC Saarbrücken ===
- 2. Bundesliga: Winner (1) 2008–09
- German Cup: Runner-up (1) 2007–08
