= Nadine Keßler =

German footballer (born 1988)

Nadine Kessler
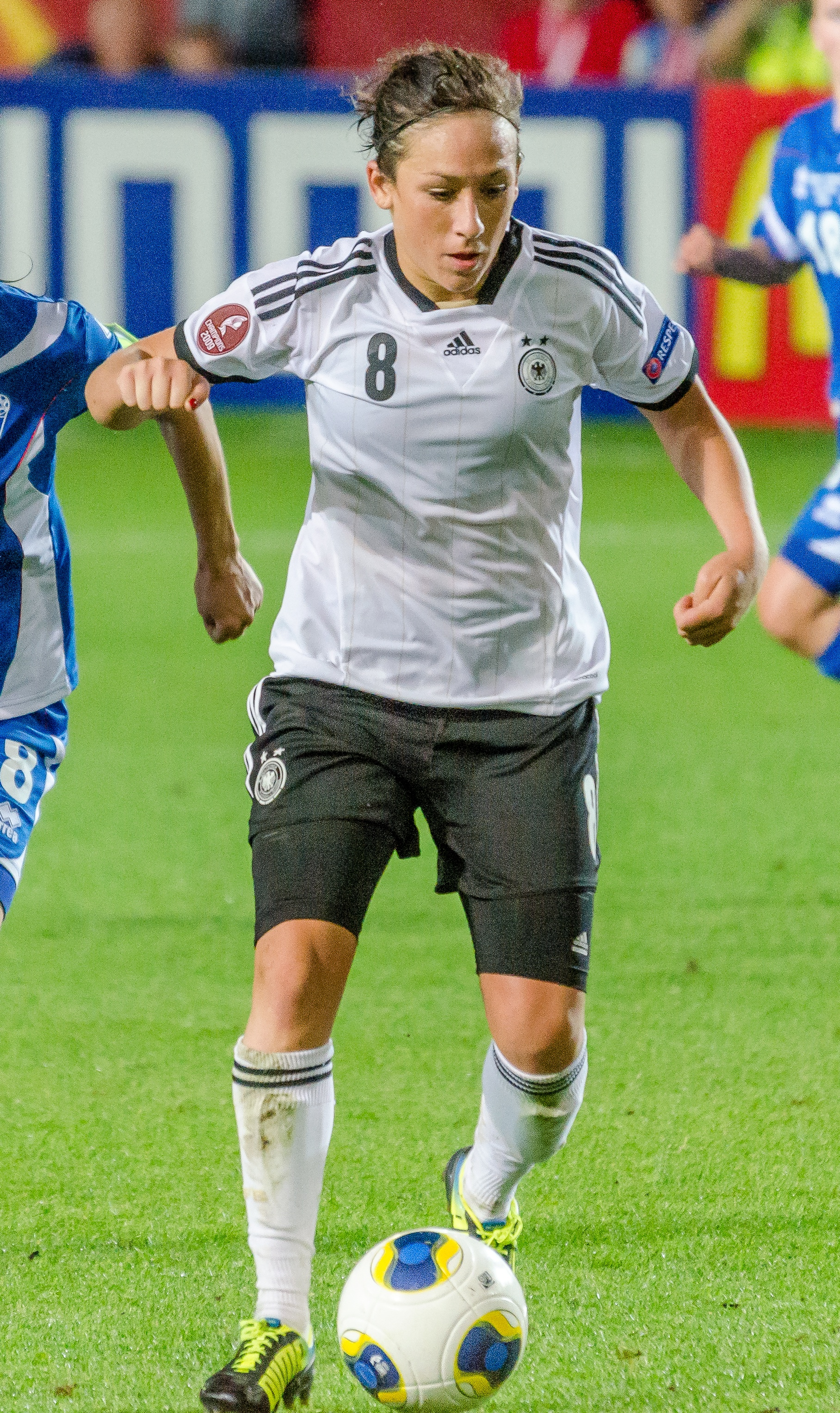
- Keßler playing for Germany at UEFA Women's Euro 2013

Personal information
- Date of birth: 4 April 1988 (age 38)
- Place of birth: Landstuhl, West Germany
- Height: 1.69 m (5 ft 7 in)
- Position: Attacking midfielder

Youth career
- SV Herschberg
- SV Hermersberg
- SC Weselberg
- 2004–2005: 1. FC Saarbrücken

Senior career*
Years	Team	Apps	(Gls)
2005–2009	1. FC Saarbrücken	52	(37)
2009–2011	1. FFC Turbine Potsdam	34	(19)
2011–2016	VfL Wolfsburg	58	(31)
Total		144	(87)

International career
2003	Germany U15	2	(1)
2003–2004	Germany U17	15	(3)
2004–2007	Germany U19	23	(10)
2008	Germany U20	10	(2)
2010–2016	Germany	29	(10)
Medal record
Women's football
Representing Germany
UEFA Women's Championship
Gold medal – first place	2013 Sweden	Team
- * Club domestic league appearances and goals

Nadine Keßler (German pronunciation: [naˈdiːn ˈkɛslɐ]; born 4 April 1988) is a German retired footballer and current UEFA's head of women's football. She played for VfL Wolfsburg and the German national team. Keßler was the recipient of the FIFA World Player of the Year award at the 2014 FIFA Ballon d'Or.

== Early life ==
Born in Landstuhl, Keßler was raised in nearby Weselberg, where she attended kindergarten and primary school. As a youth, she began playing for boys clubs SV Herschberg, SV Hermersberg, and SC Weselberg. At the age of 16, she began playing for the female team 1. FC Saarbrücken in the second division. From 2006 to 2007, she was the team's leading scorer.

After graduating from high school in 2007, Keßler began basic training in the Bundeswehr in October 2007. She was stationed in a sports promotion group at the Bundeswehr Sports School in Warendorf and held the rank of Corporal. She also attended the German University for Prevention and Health Management (DHfPG) where she received a Bachelor of Arts in Health Economics in 2012. In 2014, she enrolled in the MBA program at DHfPG.

== Club career ==
=== 1. FFC Turbine Potsdam ===
Keßler signed with 1. FFC Turbine Potsdam in the top-division Frauen Bundesliga in 2009 at the age of 21. She helped the team finish the regular season at the top of the league table with a 19–1–2 record scoring 11 goals. The team clinched the 2009–10 UEFA Women's Champions League after defeating Olympique Lyonnais in penalty kicks.

=== VfL Wolfsburg ===
In 2011, Keßler transferred to VfL Wolfsburg. The team finished second during the 2011–12 regular season with a 18–2–2 record. Keßler scored 11 goals tying for fourth in the league for most goals scored.

During the 2012–13 season, Keßler scored eight goals helping Wolfsburg finish first during the regular season with a 17–3–2 record. She captained the team to win the 2012–13 UEFA Champions League after defeating Olympique Lyonnais 1-0 in the final.

In 2014, Keßler led Wolfsburg to championships in the Frauen Bundesliga and UEFA Women's Champions League. Wolfsburg became the first German team in the history to win the treble of Frauen-Bundesliga, DFB-Pokal Frauen and the renamed UEFA Women's Champions League. Keßler was awarded the UEFA Best Women's Player in Europe Award. She was awarded the FIFA Player of the Year award in January 2015 having received 17.52% of the vote over Marta (14.16%) and Abby Wambach (13.33%). Upon receiving the award, she said, "It's a reward for hard work, good performances and a good development track. I know it's a trophy for individuals, but I'd never have won it without my teammates."

She signed a new one-year contract on 12 May 2015. She announced her retirement on 14 April 2016.

== International career ==
Keßler represented Germany at the youth level on the under-15, 17, 19, and 20 teams from 2003 to 2008. She made her debut for the senior national team at the 2010 Algarve Cup on 26 February 2010 in a match against Finland after coming on as a 46th-minute substitute for Lena Goeßling and scoring her first international goal in the 77th minute.

Keßler played attacking midfielder for Germany during the 2013 UEFA Women's Euro helping the team win their sixth consecutive trophy with a 1–0 win over Norway.

== Career statistics ==
Scores and results list Germany's goal tally first, score column indicates score after each Keßler goal.

List of international goals scored by Nadine Keßler
No.	Date	Venue	Opponent	Score	Result	Competition
1	26 February 2010	Parchal, Portugal	Finland	6–0	7–0	2010 Algarve Cup
2	13 February 2013	Strasbourg, France	France	2–3	3–3	Friendly
3	13 February 2013	Strasbourg, France	France	3–3	3–3	Friendly
4	11 March 2013	Lagos, Portugal	Norway	2–0	2–0	2013 Algarve Cup
5	21 September 2013	Cottbus, Germany	Russia	2–0	9–0	2015 FIFA Women's World Cup qualification
6	21 September 2013	Cottbus, Germany	Russia	8–0	9–0	2015 FIFA Women's World Cup qualification
7	23 November 2013	Žilina, Slovakia	Slovakia	1–0	6–0	2015 FIFA Women's World Cup qualification
8	23 November 2013	Žilina, Slovakia	Slovakia	4–0	6–0	2015 FIFA Women's World Cup qualification
9	12 March 2014	Faro, Portugal	Japan	1–0	3–0	2014 Algarve Cup
10	8 May 2014	Osnabrück, Germany	Slovakia	4–0	9–1	2015 FIFA Women's World Cup qualification

== Honours ==
1. FC Saarbrücken

- 2. Bundesliga: 2006–07, 2008–09
- German Cup: runner-up 2007–08

1. FFC Turbine Potsdam

- Bundesliga: 2009–10, 2010–11
- UEFA Women's Champions League: 2009–10
- DFB-Hallenpokal: 2010

VfL Wolfsburg

- Bundesliga: 2012–13, 2013–14
- UEFA Women's Champions League: 2012–13, 2013–14
- DFB-Pokal: 2012–13, 2014–15

Germany

- FIFA U-17 Women's World Cup: Third place 2008
- UEFA Women's U-19 Championship: 2006, 2007
- UEFA Women's Championship: 2013
- Algarve Cup: 2014
- U-17-Nordic-Cup: 2005

Individual

- Fritz Walter Medal: Silver 2006
- UEFA Best Women's Player in Europe Award: 2014
- FIFA World Player of the Year: 2014
- IFFHS World's Women Best Playmaker: 2014
- IFFHS UEFA Woman Team of the Decade 2011–2020
