= 2004–05 2. Frauen-Bundesliga =

The 2nd Fußball-Bundesliga (women) 2004–05 was the 1st season of the 2. Fußball-Bundesliga (women), Germany's second football league. It began on 5 September 2004 and ended on 22 May 2005.

== Group North ==
=== Final standings ===
Pos	Team	P	W	D	L	F	A	GD	Pts
1	FFC Brauweiler Pulheim (A)	22	18	2	2	95	25	+70	56
2	Tennis Borussia Berlin	22	16	1	5	73	25	+48	49
3	TSV Jahn Calden	22	15	2	5	59	33	+26	47
4	SG Wattenscheid 09	22	13	3	6	65	44	+21	42
5	1.FFC Turbine Potsdam II	22	12	4	6	43	32	+11	40
6	FC Gütersloh 2000	22	11	5	6	57	34	+23	38
7	SuS Timmel	22	7	5	10	30	39	-9	26
8	SV Victoria Gersten	22	7	2	13	43	42	+1	23
9	SG Lütgendortmund	22	6	3	13	26	66	-40	21
10	MTV Wolfenbüttel	22	5	4	13	25	62	-37	19
11	Hamburger SV II	22	4	2	16	24	73	-49	14
12	SpVgg Oberaußem-Fortuna	22	1	1	20	22	87	-65	4

	Will be promoted to the Fußball-Bundesliga (women)
	Will be relegated to the new Fußball-Regionalliga (women)
(A)	Relegated from the Bundesliga last season

Pld = Matches played; W = Matches won; D = Matches drawn; L = Matches lost; GF = Goals for; GA = Goals against; GD = Goal difference; Pts = Points

== Group South ==
=== Final standings ===
Pos	Team	P	W	D	L	F	A	GD	Pts
1	VfL Sindelfingen	20	16	2	2	58	19	+39	50
2	1. FC Saarbrücken (A)	20	12	3	5	52	22	+30	39
3	FF USV Jena	20	10	6	4	49	24	+25	36
4	SC Sand	20	10	4	6	31	26	+5	34
5	FFC Wacker München	20	7	9	4	34	30	+4	30
6	1.FFC Frankfurt II	20	8	3	9	35	29	+6	27
7	FSV Viktoria Jägersburg	20	6	5	9	37	47	-10	23
8	FC Erzgebirge Aue	20	5	5	10	19	34	-15	20
9	Karlsruher SC	20	6	2	12	31	51	-20	20
10	SV Jungingen	20	6	2	12	21	51	-30	20
11	1.FC Lokomotive Leipzig	20	3	1	16	21	53	-32	10

	Will be promoted to the Fußball-Bundesliga (women)
	Will be relegated to the new Fußball-Regionalliga (women)
(A)	Relegated from the Bundesliga last season

Pld = Matches played; W = Matches won; D = Matches drawn; L = Matches lost; GF = Goals for; GA = Goals against; GD = Goal difference; Pts = Points
