= 1998–99 DFB-Pokal Frauen =

Tournament details
- Country: Germany
- Teams: 32

Final positions
- Champions: FFC Frankfurt
- Runners-up: FCR Duisburg

Tournament statistics
- Matches played: 30

The Frauen DFB-Pokal 1998–99 was the 19th season of the cup competition, Germany's second-most important title in women's football. The first round of the competition was held on 16–17 August 1998. In the final which was held in Berlin on 12 June 1999 FFC Frankfurt defeated FCR Duisburg 1–0, thus winning their first cup. As they also won the Bundesliga in the same season, Frankfurt claimed the double, too.

== First round ==
Turbine Potsdam II	– ^{*}	Polizei SV Rostock
16 August 1998
SV Sereetz	0 – 7	Grün-Weiss Brauweiler
Hamburg	0 – 2	FCR 2001 Duisburg
SV Oberteuringen	1 – 11	Sportfreunde Siegen
SC Siegelbach	0 – 8	TuS Niederkirchen
1. FC Nürnberg	1 – 2	FSV Frankfurt
FSV Magdeburg-Wolmirstedt	0 – 7	Turbine Potsdam
TSV Gera-Zwötzen	0 – 3	WSV Wolfsburg-Wendschott
Erzgebirge Aue	0 – 1	Hertha Zehlendorf
FC Huchting	0 – 10	Heike Rheine
DJK Arminia Ibbenbüren	5 – 0	Lorbeer Rotheburgsort
DFC Eggenstein	1 – 8	SG Praunheim
TuS Ahrbach	1 – 6	1. FC Saarbrücken
Garather SV	1 – 4	TuS Köln rrh.
TuS Linter	1 – 2	SC Freiburg
SC Klinge Seckach	0 – 10	SC 07 Bad Neuenahr

^{*} Polizei SV Rostock withdrew their team. Turbine Potsdam II thus advanced to the next round.

== Second round ==
29 November 1998
Hertha Zehlendorf	1 – 0	Grün-Weiss Brauweiler
DJK Arminia Ibbenbühren	0 – 10	Turbine Potsdam
FCR Duisburg	4 – 1	Sportfreunde Siegen
Turbine Potsdam II	0 – 6	WSV Wolfsburg-Wendschott
16 December 1998
1. FC Saarbrücken	3 – 1	SC Freiburg
19 December 1998
TuS Köln rrh.	1 – 4	Heike Rheine	(aet)
20 December 1998
SC 07 Bad Neuenahr	2 – 1	FSV Frankfurt
21 February 1999
FFC Frankfurt^{*}	3 – 0	TuS Niederkirchen

^{*} The women's football section of SG Praunheim had moved to the newly founded FFC Frankfurt on 1 January 1999. Frankfurt took over all qualifications and players from Praunheim.

== Quarter-finals ==
28 February 1999
Hertha Zehlendorf	1 – 0	1. FC Saarbrücken	(aet)
Heike Rheine	0 – 4	FCR Duisburg
SC 07 Bad Neuenahr	2 – 3	Turbine Potsdam
WSV Wolfsburg-Wendschott	1 – 4	FFC Frankfurt

== Semi-finals ==
4 April 1999
FCR Duisburg	2 – 0	Turbine Potsdam
FFC Frankfurt	5 – 0	Hertha Zehlendorf

== Final ==
12 June 1999
16:00 (CEST)

FCR Duisburg	0 – 1	FFC Frankfurt
		Künzer 43'

Olympic Stadium (Berlin)
Attendance: 20,000
Referee: Elke Frielenbach (Much)

FC RUMELN DUISBURG:
GK	1	(Germany) Andrea Schaller
DF		(Germany) Melanie Hoffmann
DF		(Germany) Claudia Mandrysch
DF		(Germany) Iris Flacke
MF		(Germany) Kerstin Stegemann
MF		(Germany) Meike Fitzner
MF		(Germany) Martina Voss
MF		(Germany) Sandra Smisek
MF		(Germany) Sandra Albertz
FW		(Germany) Maren Meinert
FW		(Germany) Inka Grings

1. FFC FRANKFURT:
GK	1	(Netherlands) Marleen Wissink
DF		(Germany) Tina Wunderlich
DF		(Germany) Anja Zorn
DF		(Germany) Nia Künzer
DF		(Germany) Monika Meyer
DF		(Germany) Doris Fitschen
DF		(Denmark) Karina Sefron
MF		(Germany) Renate Lingor
MF		(Germany) Pia Wunderlich
FW		(Germany) Katrin Kliehm
FW		(Germany) Birgit Prinz

== See also ==
- Bundesliga 1998–99
- 1998–99 DFB-Pokal men's competition
