= 2007–08 2. Frauen-Bundesliga =

The 2nd Fußball-Bundesliga (women) 2007–08 was the 4th season of the 2. Fußball-Bundesliga (women), Germany's second football league. It began on 19 August 2007 and ended on 25 May 2008.

== North ==
Pos	Team	Pld	W	D	L	GF	GA	GD	Pts	Promotion or relegation
1	HSV Borussia Friedenstal	22	13	5	4	53	33	+20	44	Will be promoted to the Fußball-Bundesliga (women)
2	Tennis Borussia Berlin	22	12	7	3	36	18	+18	43	
3	FC Gütersloh 2000	22	12	6	4	38	18	+20	42	
4	1.FFC Turbine Potsdam II	22	12	4	6	46	23	+23	40	
5	Hamburger SV II	22	9	5	8	32	33	−1	32	
6	Holstein Kiel	22	9	5	8	28	31	−3	32	
7	1. FC Lokomotive Leipzig	22	9	4	9	38	42	−4	31	
8	FFC Oldesloe 2000 (Note: Promoted from the Regionalliga last season)	22	8	4	10	30	36	−6	28	
9	SV Victoria Gersten	22	7	6	9	38	39	−1	27	
10	1. FC Union Berlin	22	6	3	13	28	48	−20	21	
11	FFV Neubrandenburg	22	4	3	15	34	56	−22	15	Will be relegated to the new Fußball-Regionalliga (women)
12	FFC Heike Rheine (Note: Relegated from the Bundesliga last season)	22	3	4	15	26	50	−24	13	Will be relegated to the new Fußball-Regionalliga (women)

== South ==
Pos	Team	Pld	W	D	L	GF	GA	GD	Pts	Promotion or relegation
1	FF USV Jena	22	18	2	2	82	13	+69	56	Will be promoted to the Fußball-Bundesliga (women)
2	VfL Sindelfingen	22	18	2	2	70	14	+56	56	
3	FCR 2001 Duisburg II (Note: Promoted from the Regionalliga last season)	22	12	4	6	47	31	+16	40	
4	TuS Köln rrh. (Note: TuS Köln rrh. passed their license for the 2. Bundesliga to Bayer 04 Leverkusen.)	22	10	6	6	46	28	+18	36	
5	ASV Hagsfeld	22	9	4	9	38	49	−11	31	
6	SC Sand	22	8	4	10	33	34	−1	28	
7	1. FFC Frankfurt II	22	6	7	9	30	28	+2	25	
8	SV Dirmingen	22	7	4	11	30	58	−28	25	
9	TuS Niederkirchen (Note: TuS Niederkirchen did not apply for a license for the 2008–09 season and was therefore the fifth team to be relegated.)	22	5	5	12	29	58	−29	20	Will be relegated to the new Fußball-Regionalliga (women)
10	FFC Wacker München	22	5	5	12	22	52	−30	20	
11	SC Regensburg	22	5	4	13	36	59	−23	19	Will be relegated to the new Fußball-Regionalliga (women)
12	FFC Brauweiler Pulheim (Note: Relegated from the Bundesliga last season)	22	3	5	14	25	64	−39	14	Will be relegated to the new Fußball-Regionalliga (women)
