= 2007–08 DFB-Pokal Frauen =

Tournament details
- Country: Germany
- Teams: 53

Final positions
- Champions: FFC Frankfurt
- Runners-up: 1. FC Saarbrücken

Tournament statistics
- Matches played: 52
- Goals scored: 263 (5.06 per match)

The DFB-Pokal 2007–08 was the 28th season of the cup competition, Germany's second-most important title in women's football. The first round of the tournament was held on 1–2 September 2007. In the final which was held in Berlin on 19 April 2008 FFC Frankfurt defeated FC Saarbrücken 5–1, thus claiming their seventh title.

== First round ==
September 1, 2007
Karlsruher SC	0 – 1	SC Regensburg
SpVgg Rehweiler-Matzenbach	0 – 4	SV Dirmingen
September 2, 2007
Energie Cottbus	0 – 9	Holstein Kiel
TSV Jahn Calden	1 – 3	1. FC Lokomotive Leipzig
FC Erzgebirge Aue	0 – 2	SC Sand
Mellendorfer TV	3 – 2	FFC Oldesloe 2000
FSV 02 Schwerin	2 – 9	HSV Borussia Friedenstal
SuS Timmel	0 – 3	FC Gütersloh 2000
SG Lütgendortmund	1 – 3	SV Victoria Gersten	(a.e.t.)
FSC Mönchengladbach	0 – 2	Tennis Borussia Berlin
Geestemünder SC	0 – 11	1. FC Union Berlin
Magdeburger FFC	1 – 6	SG Wattenscheid 09
ASV Bergedorf 85	2 – 8	FFV Neubrandenburg
Hegauer FV	0 – 4	ASV Hagsfeld
SV Eutingen	2 – 6	1. FC Saarbrücken
SV Johannstadt 90	1 – 8	FF USV Jena
1. FFV Erfurt	2 – 6	TuS Niederkirchen
TuS Ahrbach	1 – 2	FFC Wacker München
Fortuna Köln	1 – 3	TuS Köln rrh.
TSV Uengershausen	0 – 10	VfL Sindelfingen
VfR 07 Limburg	1 – 0	FFC Brauweiler Pulheim

== Second round ==
October 20, 2007
SC Regensburg	0 – 4	SC Freiburg
SG Wattenscheid 09	1 – 6	1. FFC Turbine Potsdam
October 21, 2007
FFC Heike Rheine	0 – 5	Holstein Kiel
FFC Neubrandenburg	1 – 2	1. FC Lokomotive Leipzig
FC Bayern Munich	6 – 0	SV Dirmingen
Mellendorfer TV	1 – 12	HSV Borussia Friedenstal
SG Essen-Schönebeck	1 – 5	FCR 2001 Duisburg
Tennis Borussia Berlin	2 – 1	1. FC Union Berlin
VfL Wolfburg	1 – 2	Hamburger SV
FC Gütersloh 2000	3 – 0	SV Victoria Gersten
VfR 07 Limburg	1 – 0	ASV Hagsfeld
FFC Wacker München	0 – 3	SC 07 Bad Neuenahr
VfL Sindelfingen	1 – 9	1. FFC Frankfurt
TuS Niederkirchen	0 – 2	TuS Köln rrh.
SC Sand	0 – 2	1. FC Saarbrücken
FF USV Jena	0 – 1	TSV Crailsheim

== Third round ==
November 24, 2007
FC Gütersloh 2000	6 – 0	1. FC Lokomotive Leipzig
FCR 2001 Duisburg	5 – 0	HSV Borussia Friedenstal
November 25, 2007
Holstein Kiel	1 – 4	1. FC Saarbrücken
TSV Crailsheim	3 – 2	Hamburger SV
1. FFC Frankfurt	1 – 0	Tennis Borussia Berlin
VfR 07 Limburg	0 – 2	TuS Köln rrh.
FC Bayern Munich	2 – 1	SC Freiburg
SC 07 Bad Neuenahr	4 – 6	1. FFC Turbine Potsdam	(a.e.t.)

== Quarter-finals ==
December 16, 2007
FC Bayern Munich	2 – 2	FCR 2001 Duisburg	(a.e.t.) (5 – 2 pen)
1. FFC Turbine Potsdam	0 – 1	1. FFC Frankfurt
TSV Crailsheim	0 – 2	1. FC Saarbrücken
FC Gütersloh 2000	1 – 1	TuS Köln rrh.	(a.e.t.) (2 – 4 pen)

== Semi-finals ==
March 23, 2008
TuS Köln rrh.	0 – 2	1. FC Saarbrücken
March 24, 2008
FC Bayern Munich	0 – 4	1. FFC Frankfurt

== Final ==
April 19, 2008
16:30 (CEST)

1. FC Saarbrücken	1 – 5	1. FFC Frankfurt
Budge 4'		Wimbersky 22'; Pohlers 50'; Garefrekes 54'; Pohlers 59'; Prinz 75'

Olympic Stadium (Berlin)
Attendance: 20,000
Referee: Daniela Schneider (Limbach-Oberfrohna)

1. FC Saarbrücken	1. FFC Frankfurt

1. FC SAARBRÜCKEN:
GK	1	(Germany) Romina Holz
DF	26	(Germany) Nadine Kraus		(substituted off) 74'
DF	7	(Germany) Vicky Hinsberger		(substituted off) 70'
DF	20	(Germany) Josephine Henning	Booked
DF	23	(Germany) Sabine Blank
MF	8	(Germany) Sarah Karnbach
MF	22	(Germany) Selina Wagner
MF	11	(United States) Natalie Budge
MF	10	(Germany) Nadine Keßler (c)
FW	19	(Germany) Lisa Schwab		(substituted off) 76'
FW	12	(Germany) Dzsenifer Marozsán
Substitutes:
MF	26	(Germany) Sabrina Meyer		(substituted on) 74'
FW	13	(Germany) Julia Leykauf		(substituted on) 70'
FW	6	(Germany) Christina Arend		(substituted on) 76'
Manager:
(Germany) Guido Mey

1. FFC FRANKFURT:
GK	1	(Germany) Silke Rottenberg
DF	11	(Germany) Katrin Kliehm
DF	8	(Germany) Tina Wunderlich (c)
DF	2	(United States) Gina Lewandowski
DF	14	(United States) Alexandra Krieger
MF	18	(Germany) Kerstin Garefrekes
MF	21	(Germany) Karolin Thomas
MF	10	(Germany) Renate Lingor	(substituted off) 73'
MF	20	(Germany) Petra Wimbersky	(substituted off) 73'
FW	9	(Germany) Birgit Prinz
FW	6	(Germany) Conny Pohlers
Substitutes:
MF	12	(Germany) Meike Weber	(substituted on) 73'
MF	28	(Germany) Sandra Smisek	(substituted on) 73'
Manager:
(Germany) Günter Wegmann

MATCH RULES

- 90 minutes.
- 30 minutes of extra-time if necessary, except in the final.
- Penalty shootout if scores still level.
- Seven named substitutes
- Maximum of 3 substitutions.
