= 3. Liga Frauen =

- Founded: 2026
- Country: Germany
- Divisions: 3
- Number of clubs: 36
- Level on pyramid: 3
- Promotion to: 2. Bundesliga
- Relegation to: Regionalliga

The 3. Liga Frauen will be the third league competition for women's association football in Germany. It will be divided into three groups: Nord, Mitte and Süd. The winners of each group are promoted to the 2. Bundesliga; the last three teams per group are relegated to the Regionalliga.

The inaugural season will be in 2027–28 and will consist of the relegated teams of the 2. Bundesliga, teams from the Regionalliga who were not relegated and promoted teams to the Regionalliga. Each regional federation has a fixed quota; Nord 9; Nordost 4; West 8; Südwest 3; Süd 12.

The 36 teams will be split into three groups of 12 teams each year, based on geographical location and play a league system with home and away matches. The winner of each group will be promoted to the 2. Bundesliga, the last three teams are relegated to the Regionalliga.

== Champions ==
Season	Nord	Mitte	Süd
2027–28			
