= 2006–07 2. Frauen-Bundesliga =

The 2nd Fußball-Bundesliga (women) 2006–07 was the 3rd season of the 2. Fußball-Bundesliga (women), Germany's second football league. It began on 10 September 2006 and ended on 28 May 2007.

== Group North ==
=== Final standings ===
Pos	Team	P	W	D	L	F	A	GD	Pts
1	SG Wattenscheid 09	22	18	1	3	84	23	+61	55
2	Hamburger SV II (N)	22	14	2	6	44	30	+14	44
3	Tennis Borussia Berlin	22	13	2	7	37	26	+11	41
4	FC Gütersloh 2000	22	13	0	9	66	33	+33	39
5	1. FFC Turbine Potsdam II	22	13	3	6	47	29	+18	39^{*}
6	1. FC Lokomotive Leipzig (N)	22	10	4	8	41	42	-1	34
7	Holstein Kiel	22	9	6	7	38	35	+3	33
8	HSV Borussia Friedenstal (N)	22	8	6	8	42	42	0	30
9	SV Victoria Gersten	22	6	4	12	30	48	-18	22
10	FFV Neubrandenburg	22	5	2	15	21	49	-28	17
11	SuS Timmel	22	2	4	16	18	57	-39	10
12	TSV Jahn Calden	22	2	4	16	20	74	-54	10

^{*} Potsdam was awarded a 3-point penalty for using a player without a player's license.

	Will be promoted to the Fußball-Bundesliga (women)
	Relegation play against the 10th of the group south
	Will be relegated to the new Fußball-Regionalliga (women)
(N)	Promoted from the Regionalliga last season
(A)	Relegated from the Bundesliga last season

Pld = Matches played; W = Matches won; D = Matches drawn; L = Matches lost; GF = Goals for; GA = Goals against; GD = Goal difference; Pts = Points

== Group South ==
=== Final standings ===
Pos	Team	P	W	D	L	F	A	GD	Pts
1	1. FC Saarbrücken	22	17	4	1	79	19	+60	55
2	FF USV Jena	22	16	2	4	63	28	+35	50
3	VfL Sindelfingen (A)	22	15	1	6	81	22	+59	46
4	1. FFC Frankfurt II	22	11	6	5	50	27	+23	39
5	TuS Köln rrh.	22	10	8	4	43	19	+24	38
6	TuS Niederkirchen	22	8	3	11	36	35	+1	27
7	SC Sand	22	8	3	11	38	46	-8	27
8	SC Regensburg (N)	22	8	3	11	44	54	-10	27
9	FFC Wacker München	22	7	4	11	18	32	-14	25
10	FC Erzgebirge Aue	22	6	3	13	24	58	-34	21
11	Karlsruher SC	22	3	3	16	19	78	-59	12
12	SC 07 Bad Neuenahr II (N)	22	2	2	18	19	96	-77	8

	Will be promoted to the Fußball-Bundesliga (women)
	Relegation play against the 10th of the north group
	Will be relegated to the new Fußball-Regionalliga (women)
(N)	Promoted from the Regionalliga last season
(A)	Relegated from the Bundesliga last season

Pld = Matches played; W = Matches won; D = Matches drawn; L = Matches lost; GF = Goals for; GA = Goals against; GD = Goal difference; Pts = Points

== Relegation play-offs ==
For the first time five teams were relegated after the season. The 11th and 12th-place finishers of each division were automatically relegated while the 10th-place finishers of each division determined the fifth team to be relegated in a match over two legs.

Team 1	Agg.	Team 2	1st leg	2nd leg
FC Erzgebirge Aue	2–3	FFV Neubrandenburg	2–2	0–1
