= Hasan Egilmez =

German-Turkish football manager

Hasan Egilmez (born 11 September 1977) is a German/Turkish football manager formerly in charge of a scouting company which worked for Bayern Munich, Arsenal FC, Newcastle and several other scouting projects.

== Biography ==
Egilmez was born in Sindelfingen. Before his career as coach/scout he played as a striker for VfL Sindelfingen. Egilmez is former Technical Director of the Euro Football Academy in Nigeria and produced more than 30 professional players for European teams. He was the Chief Scout for Africa in the Euro Football Academy.

Egilmez was Head Coach & Manager of Nigerian Professional National League Side 36 Lion FC. He was also Head Coach & Manager of Albanian Superleague Side FK Tomori Berat. He is currently Managing Famous Football Stars.
