= Laura Lindner =

Association football player

Personal information
- Date of birth: 6 June 1994 (age 32)
- Place of birth: Cottbus, Germany
- Height: 1.66 m (5 ft 5 in)
- Positions: Midfielder; forward

Team information
- Current team: 1. FFC Turbine Potsdam
- Number: 38

Senior career*
Years	Team	Apps	(Gls)
2011–2023	1. FFC Turbine Potsdam II	179	(60)
2015–2018	1. FFC Turbine Potsdam	31	(8)
2020	1. FFC Turbine Potsdam	5	(1)
2023–	1. FFC Turbine Potsdam	32	(5)
- * Club domestic league appearances and goals

Laura Lindner (born 6 June 1994) is a German footballer who plays as a midfielder for 1. FFC Turbine Potsdam. In 2016 Lindner signed an extension contract with 1. FFC Turbine Potsdam till 2018.

== Honours ==
- 2. Frauen-Bundesliga: 2010, 2012 (with Turbine Potsdam II)
