= 2008–09 2. Frauen-Bundesliga =

The 2nd Fußball-Bundesliga (women) 2008–09 was the 5th season of the 2. Fußball-Bundesliga (women), Germany's second football league. It began on 7 September 2008 and ended on 24 May 2009. After the last season the women's section of TuS Köln rrh. passed their license for the league to Bayer 04 Leverkusen.

== North ==
Pos	Team	Pld	W	D	L	GF	GA	GD	Pts	Qualification or relegation
1	Tennis Borussia Berlin (C)	22	19	2	1	59	18	+41	59	Promotion to 2009–10 Bundesliga
2	Turbine Potsdam II	22	16	2	4	56	27	+29	50	
3	1. FC Lokomotive Leipzig	22	14	2	6	45	27	+18	44	
4	FC Gütersloh 2000	22	12	3	7	43	27	+16	39	
5	Hamburger SV	22	10	5	7	44	30	+14	35	
6	FFC Oldesloe 2000	22	10	3	9	23	27	−4	33	
7	Holstein Kiel	22	8	3	11	27	37	−10	27	
8	Blau-Weiß Hohen Neuendorf	22	7	3	12	29	41	−12	24	
9	SV Victoria Gersten	22	6	5	11	31	35	−4	23	
10	Mellendorfer TV (R)	22	5	2	15	22	53	−31	17	Qualification for the relegation play-off
11	SG Lütgendortmund (R)	22	4	3	15	20	45	−25	15	Relegation to 2009–10 Regionalliga
12	1. FC Union Berlin (R)	22	3	3	16	22	54	−32	12	Relegation to 2009–10 Regionalliga

Updated to match(es) played on 24 May 2009. Source: kicker (in German)
Rules for classification: 1) points; 2) goal difference; 3) number of goals scored.
(C) Champions; (R) Relegated

== South ==
Pos	Team	Pld	W	D	L	GF	GA	GD	Pts	Qualification or relegation
1	1. FC Saarbrücken (C)	22	18	3	1	81	10	+71	57	Promotion to 2009–10 Bundesliga
2	VfL Sindelfingen	22	18	1	3	60	16	+44	55	
3	FCR 2001 Duisburg II	22	14	2	6	51	28	+23	44	
4	SG Wattenscheid 09	22	13	3	6	44	33	+11	42	
5	FFC Frankfurt II	22	12	3	7	47	29	+18	39	
6	ASV Hagsfeld	22	8	6	8	42	39	+3	30	
7	Bayer Leverkusen	22	6	7	9	47	40	+7	25	
8	SC Sand	22	6	6	10	37	47	−10	24	
9	FFC Wacker München	22	7	3	12	28	45	−17	24	
10	FV Löchgau	22	5	2	15	38	63	−25	17	Qualification for the relegation pla-yoff
11	FSV Viktoria Jägersburg (R)	22	4	2	16	25	78	−53	14	Relegation to 2009–10 Regionalliga
12	SV Dirmingen (R)	22	1	2	19	20	92	−72	5	Relegation to 2009–10 Regionalliga

Updated to match(es) played on 24 May 2009. Source: kicker (in German)
Rules for classification: 1) points; 2) goal difference; 3) number of goals scored.
(C) Champions; (R) Relegated

== Relegation play-offs ==
Team 1	Agg.	Team 2	1st leg	2nd leg
FV Löchgau	2–1	Mellendorfer TV	1–1	1–0
