= Julia Matuschewski =

Polish footballer (born 1997)

Personal information
- Full name: Julia Matuschewski
- Date of birth: 15 January 1997 (age 29)
- Place of birth: Germany
- Height: 1.68 m (5 ft 6 in)
- Position: Forward

Team information
- Current team: Basel
- Number: 10

Senior career*
Years	Team	Apps	(Gls)
2013–2018	1. FFC Frankfurt II	58	(34)
2015–2018	1. FFC Frankfurt	17	(0)
2018–2021	1. FC Saarbrücken	48	(26)
2021–2022	Basel	19	(7)
2022–2023	Sturm Graz	17	(13)
2023–2026	SC Sand	75	(35)
2026–	Basel	0	(0)

International career
2011–2012	Germany U15	5	(0)
2015	Germany U19	2	(0)
2017–2020	Poland	21	(2)
- * Club domestic league appearances and goals as of 08:42, 3 June 2026 (UTC)

Julia Matuschewski (born 15 January 1997) is a professional footballer who plays as a forward for Swiss Super League club Basel. Born in Germany, she has represented Poland internationally.

== Career ==
Matuschewski has been capped for the Poland national team, appearing for the team during the 2019 FIFA Women's World Cup qualifying cycle.

== Career statistics ==
=== International ===
Appearances and goals by national team and year
National team	Year	Apps	Goals
Poland	2017	9	2
Poland	2018	7	0
Poland	2019	5	0
Total		21	2
