= Vanessa Martini =

German association football player

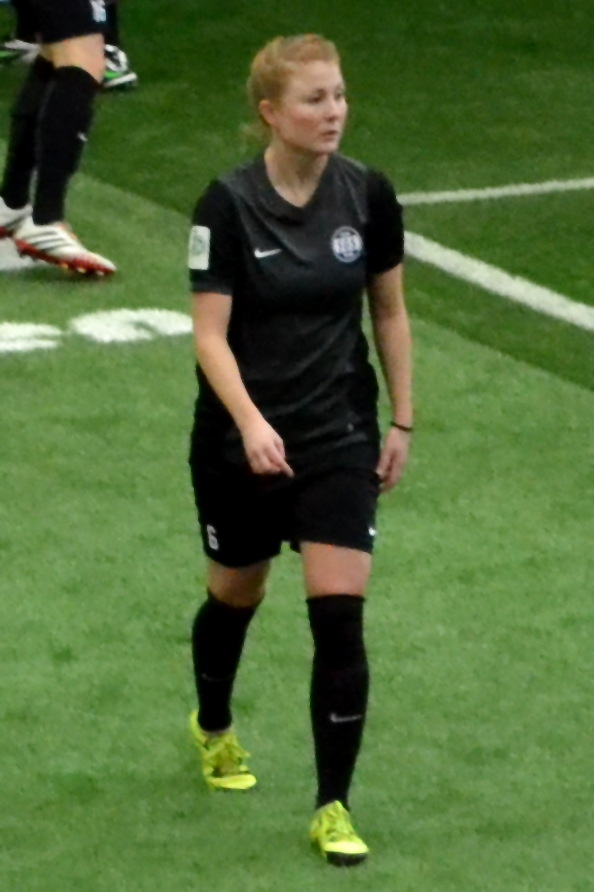

Personal information
- Date of birth: 26 September 1989 (age 37)
- Place of birth: Rees, Germany
- Height: 1.62 m (5 ft 4 in)
- Position: Defender

Vanessa Martini (born September 26, 1989) is a German footballer who has played for SGS Essen.
