= TuS Köln rrh. =

- Full name: Turn- und Sportverein 1874 Köln rechtsrheinisch e.V.
- Founded: 1874
- Ground: Sportpark Höhenberg

TuS Köln rrh. is a multi-sports club from the Höhenberg district of Cologne. The club was founded through the 1946 merger of the gymnastics clubs Turnverein Kalk 1874 and Turnvereins Köln-Höhenberg and offers football, track and field, swimming, tennis, gymnastics, karate, rugby, and volleyball. While the club's sports sections are mostly committed to amateur sports the club is best known for its former women's football department. TuS had taken over the women's team from the record champion SSG Bergisch Gladbach in 1996, but the team left the club in 2008 to join Bayer Leverkusen.

== Football ==
The men's team currently plays in the Kreisliga C Köln which is the sixth division in Middle Rhine region. The women's squad played mostly second tier football with a few seasons in the third tier in between. Since the team left the club in 2008 TuS tried to establish a new women's football division of their own, and they did in 2010 after seeing an increase in their membership. The women's team restarted in the 1. Kreisklasse where they won all their games unbeaten to earn the championship but were not promoted, and entered next season's Kreisliga A, the lowest division, where they play since then.

=== Seasons ===
TuS Köln rrh. had already had a women's team for several years when the women's football department of SSG Bergisch Gladbach joined the club in July 1996. The former team of Bergisch Gladbach had played in the Regionalliga where they continued to play at TuS. In 1999 the team was relegated to the Verbandsliga but managed promotion back to the Regionalliga immediately. Afterwards the club stayed for several seasons in the Regionalliga. When TuS qualified for the 2nd Bundesliga at its inception in 2004 the club was not able to meet the organizational requirements of a promotion. TuS qualified again in the following season and this time took advantage of their right for promotion. The team achieved mid-table results in the following three, but left the club at the end of June 2008, expecting better general conditions for promotion to the Bundesliga at Bayer Leverkusen.

Season	League	Place	W	D	L	GF	GA	Pts	DFB-Pokal
1996–97	Regionalliga (II)	unknown							not qualified
1997–98	Regionalliga	unknown							not qualified
1998–99	Regionalliga	unknown							2nd round
1999–00	Verbandsliga (III)	1		1	1				not qualified
2000–01	Regionalliga (II)	unknown							not qualified
2001–02	Regionalliga	9	7	6	11	34	46	27	not qualified
2002–03	Regionalliga	4	12	4	8	43	33	40	not qualified
2003–04	Regionalliga	4	10	8	6	43	39	38	not qualified
2004–05	Regionalliga (III)	1	19	2	1	67	15	59	2nd round
2005–06	2nd Bundesliga (south) (II)	4	13	5	4	49	20	44	2nd round
2006–07	2nd Bundesliga (south)	5	10	8	4	43	19	38	3rd round
2007–08	2nd Bundesliga (south)	4	10	6	6	46	28	36	Semi-final
2008–10	inactive								
2010–11	1. Kreisklasse (VII)	1	17	0	0	66	8	58	not qualified
2011–12	Kreisliga (VII)	5	12	5	9	66	40	41	not qualified
2012–13	Kreisliga	6	12	8	8	81	37	44	not qualified
2013–14	Kreisliga	9	11	2	13	56	46	35	not qualified
2014–15	Kreisliga	13	4	0	24	25	187	12	not qualified
Green marks a season followed by promotion, red a season followed by relegation.
