= Andrea Schaller =

German footballer

Personal information
- Date of birth: 14 September 1976 (age 50)
- Height: 1.82 m (6 ft 0 in)
- Position: Goalkeeper

International career
Years	Team	Apps	(Gls)
2000	Germany	1	(0)

Andrea Schaller (born 1976) is a German former footballer who became an academic specializing in health care research as a professor at the German Sport University Cologne and the University of the Bundeswehr Munich.

== Football ==
Schaller played football as a goalkeeper. She played 18 matches in the Frauen-Bundesliga for SC 07 Bad Neuenahr, from 1999 through 2005, and made one appearance for the Germany women's national football team in 2000. She was also part of Germany's squad for the women's football tournament at the 2000 Summer Olympics, but did not play in any matches. Looking back on that time in a 2020 interview, she describes her professional football career more a period of failure, self-doubt, and injuries than of success.

== Academic career ==
Following her athletic career, Schaller became an academic researcher in health care research. As an undergraduate, she studied sports therapy at the German Sport University Cologne and worked as a sports therapist, while later on studying epidemiology at Heinrich Heine University Düsseldorf. She completed a Ph.D. in 2009 on the relation between sports medicine and the International Classification of Functioning, Disability and Health. From 2016 to 2018, she worked as a professor for the IST-Hochschule für Management in Düsseldorf, while in 2018 she became a university professor at the German Sport University Cologne. Since 2023 she has been Professor of Health, Workplace Health Promotion and Prevention in the Department of Human Sciences at the University of the Bundeswehr Munich.

== Personal life ==
Former competitive athlete and current university professor Andrea Schaller talks about how she deals with the chronic disease multiple sclerosis in the second newsletter of the project “Exemplary leadership! Strengthening inclusion in the workplace with role models.”
