= Meike Weber =

German footballer

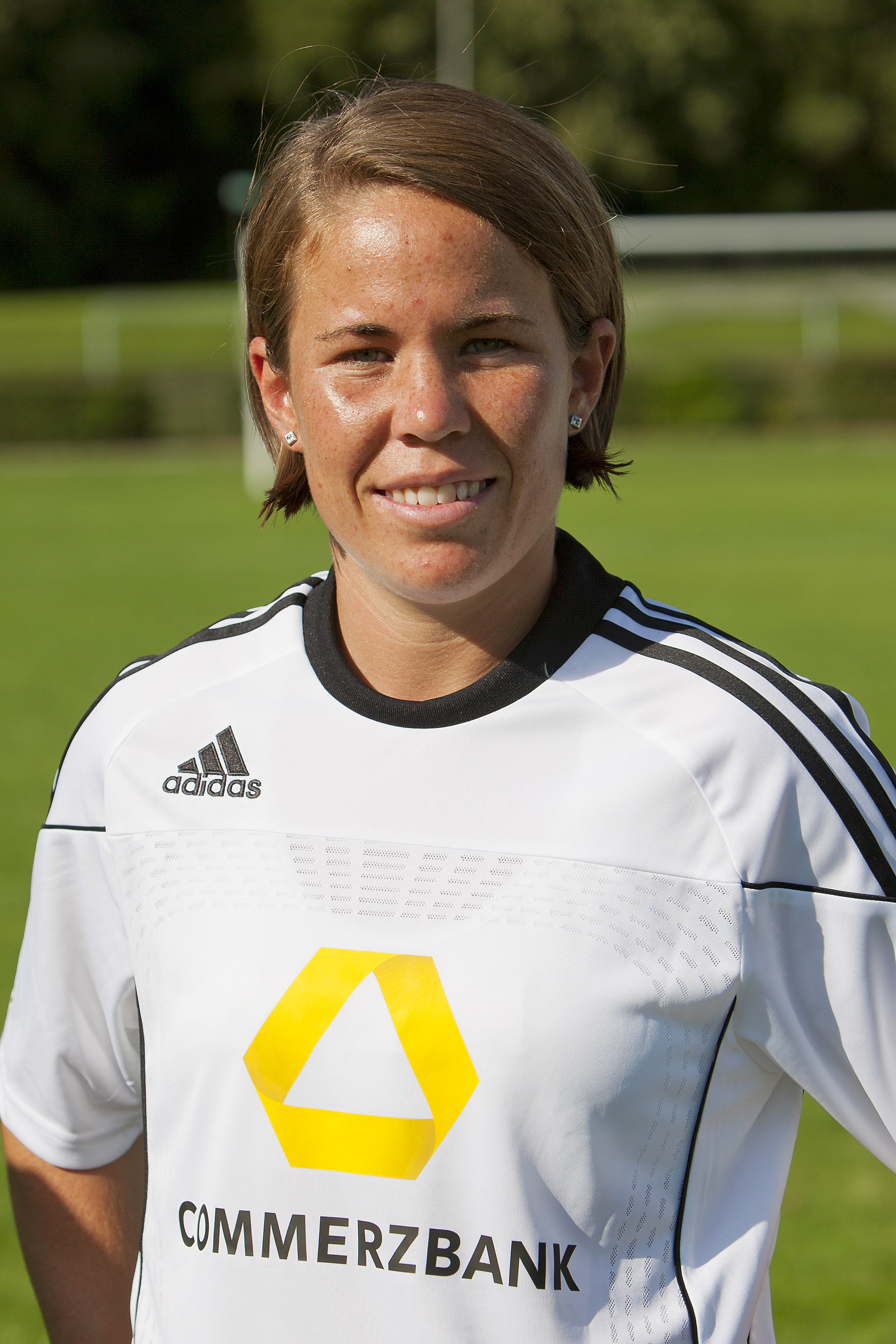

Personal information
- Date of birth: 30 March 1987 (age 39)
- Place of birth: Erbach im Odenwald, Germany
- Height: 1.59 m (5 ft 3 in)
- Position: Midfielder

Team information
- Current team: TSG Neu-Isenburg
- Number: 7

Senior career*
Years	Team	Apps	(Gls)
2003–2004	1. FCA Darmstadt		
2004–2014	1. FFC Frankfurt		
2014–2017	TSV Schott Mainz		
2017–2018	1. FFC Frankfurt II		
2018–2019	Eintracht Frankfurt		
2019–	TSG Neu-Isenburg		

International career
	Germany U19	12	(0)
	Germany U20	2	(0)
	Germany U23	7	(0)
- * Club domestic league appearances and goals

Meike Weber (born 7 April 1983) is a German football midfielder who currently plays for TSG Neu-Isenburg.

She won the 2005–06 UEFA Women's Cup with 1. FFC Frankfurt, and was also a losing finalist with the same team in the 2011-12 UEFA Women's Champions League. She represented Germany on three youth international levels.
