= VfL Sindelfingen =

German sports club

- Full name: VfL Sindelfingen 1862 e.V.
- Founded: 1862
- Ground: Floschenstadion (Sindelfingen)
- Capacity: 5,000
- Chairman: Martina Schmid
- Head Coach: Saban Uzun
- League: 2. Bundesliga
- 2015–16: 8th

VfL Sindelfingen is a German sports club from Sindelfingen, Baden–Württemberg. With more than 9,000 members, the club, which was established in 1862, is one of the largest sporting organizations in Germany. VfL Sindelfingen has departments for various sports including football (soccer), volleyball, basketball, swimming, athletics, table tennis, and badminton.

== Football ==
=== Women ===
The women's football section is one of the most successful departments in the club. They played in the Bundesliga, Germany's premier football league for women, from its inception in 1990 till 1997. They were relegated after the 1996–97 season and struggled for some years. When the second Bundesliga was incepted in 2004 Sindelfingen was one of the founding members and even managed promotion to the Bundesliga after the first season. After a year in the Bundesliga they were relegated back to the second league, where they played 2012, when they were again promoted to the premier category.

The team's current kit is light blue-white for home games and white or black-red for away games.

==== Statistics ====
Season	League	Place	W	D	L	GF	GA	Pts	DFB-Pokal
1990–91	Bundesliga Süd (I)	7	6	5	7	27	30	17	Quarter-finals
1991–92	Bundesliga Süd	4	10	6	4	33	19	26	3rd round
1992–93	Bundesliga Süd	5	6	5	7	26	20	17	3rd round
1993–94	Bundesliga Süd	7	6	1	11	22	41	13	3rd round
1994–95	Bundesliga Süd	5	6	5	7	20	32	17	Quarter-finals
1995–96	Bundesliga Süd	6	6	2	10	32	40	20	2nd Round
1996–97	Bundesliga Süd	9	4	4	10	22	39	16	Quarter-finals
1997–98	Oberliga Baden-Württemberg (II)	7	9	5	10	53	54	32	not qualified
1998–99	Oberliga Baden-Württemberg	8	7	8	7	34	33	29	not qualified
1999–00	Oberliga Baden-Württemberg	6	8	5	9	49	43	29	not qualified
2000–01	unknown								not qualified
2001–02	unknown								not qualified
2002–03	Oberliga Baden-Württemberg (III)	1	unknown						not qualified
2003–04	Regionalliga Süd (II)	4	10	2	6	30	15	32	not qualified
2004–05	2. Bundesliga Süd (II)	1	16	2	2	58	19	50	not qualified
2005–06	Bundesliga (I)	11	2	5	15	19	72	11	3rd round
2006–07	2. Bundesliga Süd	3	15	1	6	81	22	46	2nd round
2007–08	2. Bundesliga Süd	2	18	2	2	70	14	56	2nd round
2008–09	2. Bundesliga Süd	2	18	1	3	60	16	55	Quarter-finals
2009–10	2. Bundesliga Süd	2	16	4	2	49	12	52	3rd round
2010–11	2. Bundesliga Süd	5	9	4	9	32	37	31	2nd round
2011–12	2. Bundesliga Süd	1	18	2	2	63	14	56	3rd round
Green marks a season followed by promotion, red a season followed by relegation.

=== Men ===
The men's team gained promotion to the Verbandsliga Württemberg (VI) after the 2006–07 season, where they are still playing.

=== Swimming ===
The swimming team of Sindelfingen is a member of the Bundesliga. The women are part of the second Bundesliga.

=== Former players ===
- (Portugal) Sandra Ribieras
