= 2. Frauen-Bundesliga =

- Founded: 2004
- Country: Germany
- Divisions: 1
- Number of clubs: 14
- Level on pyramid: 2
- Promotion to: Bundesliga
- Relegation to: Regionalliga (until 2026); 3. Liga (from 2027)
- Domestic cup: Frauen DFB-Pokal
- Current champions: VfB Stuttgart (1st title)
- Most championships: TSG Hoffenheim II (3 titles)
- Website: Official website
- Current: 2026–27 2. Frauen-Bundesliga

The 2. Frauen-Bundesliga is the second league competition for women's association football in Germany. For its first 14 seasons the league was divided into two groups: Nord and Süd. The winner and the runner-up are promoted to the Bundesliga (unless they are reserve teams of Bundesliga sides); the last three places are relegated to the Regionalliga. Until the 2017–18 season, in each group, the winner was promoted and the bottom two were relegated.

The league has been played as one group of 14 teams since the 2018–19 season, with second teams of clubs being ineligible for promotion and allowed to have only three players older than 20 years.

For the 2020–21 season only, the 2. Frauen-Bundesliga was divided into two groups of 10 and nine teams each due to the relegation being suspended for the 2019–20 season as a result of COVID-19 pandemic. The two group winners were promoted to the Frauen-Bundesliga for the 2021–22 season, when a single group was used again.

== Clubs ==
Members for the 2025–26 2. Frauen-Bundesliga.

Locations of teams in the 2025–26 2. Frauen-Bundesliga

Team	Home city	Home ground	Capacity
SG Andernach	Andernach	Stadion am Bassenheimer Weg	15,220
Viktoria Berlin	Berlin	Stadion Lichterfelde	4,300
VfL Bochum	Bochum	Leichtathletikplatz am Ruhrstadion	1,500
Eintracht Frankfurt II	Frankfurt	Stadion am Brentanobad	5,200
FC Ingolstadt	Ingolstadt	ESV-Stadion	11,481
Mainz 05	Mainz	Bruchwegstadion	18,700
SV Meppen	Meppen	Hänsch-Arena	16,500
Borussia Mönchengladbach	Mönchengladbach	Grenzlandstadion	10,000
Bayern Munich II	Munich	Sportpark Aschheim	3,000
Turbine Potsdam	Potsdam	Karl-Liebknecht-Stadion	10,787
SC Sand	Willstätt	Kühnmatt Stadion	2,000
VfB Stuttgart	Stuttgart	Stadion Hafenbahnstraße	2,000
VfR Warbeyen	Kleve	Bresserbergstadion	6,000
VfL Wolfsburg II	Wolfsburg	AOK Stadion	5,200

== Champions ==
Season	Nord	Süd
2004–05	FFC Brauweiler Pulheim	VfL Sindelfingen
2005–06	VfL Wolfsburg	TSV Crailsheim
2006–07	SG Wattenscheid 09	1. FC Saarbrücken
2007–08	HSV Borussia Friedenstal	FF USV Jena
2008–09	Tennis Borussia Berlin	1. FC Saarbrücken
2009–10	HSV Borussia Friedenstal	Bayer 04 Leverkusen
2010–11	Hamburger SV II^{1}	SC Freiburg
2011–12	1. FFC Turbine Potsdam II^{2}	VfL Sindelfingen
2012–13	BV Cloppenburg	TSG 1899 Hoffenheim
2013–14	1. FFC Turbine Potsdam II^{3}	SC Sand
2014–15	1. FC Lübars^{4}	1. FC Köln
2015–16	MSV Duisburg	TSG 1899 Hoffenheim II^{5}
2016–17	Werder Bremen	TSG 1899 Hoffenheim II^{6}
2017–18	Borussia Mönchengladbach	TSG 1899 Hoffenheim II^{7}
Season	Champions	Runners-up
2018–19	Bayern Munich II^{8}	VfL Wolfsburg II^{8}
2019–20	Werder Bremen	VfL Wolfsburg II^{9}
Season	Nord	Süd
2020–21	Carl Zeiss Jena	1. FC Köln
Season	Champions	Runners-up
2021–22	SV Meppen	MSV Duisburg
2022–23	RB Leipzig	1. FC Nürnberg
2023–24	Turbine Potsdam	Carl Zeiss Jena
2024–25	Union Berlin	1. FC Nürnberg
2025–26	VfB Stuttgart	Mainz 05

- ^{1} Hamburg II was the first reserve team that won the league. As reserve teams are ineligible for promotion, runners-up 1. FC Lokomotive Leipzig were promoted.
- ^{2} Runners-up FSV Gütersloh 2009 were promoted.
- ^{3} Runners-up Herford were promoted.
- ^{4} Lübars did not apply for a Bundesliga licence for financial reasons. Runners-up Werder Bremen were promoted.
- ^{5} Runners-up Borussia Mönchengladbach were promoted.
- ^{6} Runners-up 1. FC Köln were promoted.
- ^{7} As the top two were reserve teams (runners-up were Bayern Munich II), third-placed Bayer 04 Leverkusen were promoted.
- ^{8} As the top two were reserve teams, third-placed 1. FC Köln and fourth-placed USV Jena were promoted.
- ^{9} As the second- and third-placed teams were reserve teams, fourth-placed SV Meppen were promoted.

== Top scorers ==
=== Nord ===
- 2004–05: Anja Koser (FFC Brauweiler Pulheim) – 27 goals
- 2005–06: Martina Müller (VfL Wolfsburg) – 36 goals
- 2006–07: Jennifer Ninaus (SG Wattenscheid 09) – 19 goals
- 2007–08: Marie Pollmann (Herforder SV – 21 goals
- 2008–09: Kerstin Straka (Tennis Borussia Berlin) & Martina Fennen (SV Victoria Gersten) – 12 goals
- 2009–10: Kathrin Patzke (Hamburger SV) – 25 goals
- 2010–11: Kathrin Patzke (Hamburger SV) – 21 goals
- 2011–12: Agnieszka Winczo (BV Cloppenburg) – 24 goals
- 2012–13: Anna Laue (Herforder SV) – 22 goals
- 2013–14: Cindy König (Werder Bremen) – 17 goals
- 2014–15: Cindy König (Werder Bremen) – 19 goals
- 2015–16: Giustina Ronzetti (Herforder SV) – 23 goals
- 2016–17: Agnieszka Winczo (BV Cloppenburg) – 25 goals
- 2017–18: Sarah Grünheid (Arminia Bielefeld) – 16 goals
- 2020–21: Sarah Abu-Sabbah (Borussia Mönchengladbach) – 11 goals

=== Süd ===
- 2004–05: Christina Arend (1. FC Saarbrücken) – 25 goals
- 2005–06: Nadine Keßler (1. FC Saarbrücken) – 24 goals
- 2006–07: Nadine Keßler (1. FC Saarbrücken) – 27 goals
- 2007–08: Sabrina Schmutzler (FF USV Jena) – 27 goals
- 2008–09: Jennifer Ninaus (SG Wattenscheid 09) – 20 goals
- 2009–10: Bilgin Defterli (1. FC Köln) – 22 goals
- 2010–11: Susanne Hartel (TSG 1899 Hoffenheim) – 16 goals
- 2011–12: Natalia Mann (VfL Sindelfingen) / Claudia Nußelt (TSV Crailsheim) – 16 goals
- 2012–13: Julia Manger (ETSV Würzburg) – 24 goals
- 2013–14: Ilaria Mauro (SC Sand) / Sarah Schatton (1. FC Saarbrücken) – 24 goals
- 2014–15: Lise Munk (1. FC Köln) – 27 goals
- 2015–16: Nadja Pfeiffer (Borussia Mönchengladbach) – 16 goals
- 2016–17: Annika Eberhard (TSG 1899 Hoffenheim II) – 18 goals
- 2017–18: Jana Beuschlein (TSG 1899 Hoffenheim) / Jacqueline de Backer (1. FC Saarbrücken) – 18 goals
- 2020–21: Vanessa Leimenstoll (TSG 1899 Hoffenheim II) – 14 goals

=== One group ===
- 2018–19: Julia Matuschewski (1. FC Saarbrücken) – 20 goals
- 2019–20: Laura Lindner (Turbine Potsdam II) – 16 goals
- 2021–22: Nastassja Lein (1. FC Nürnberg) / Ramona Maier (FC Ingolstadt) – 25 goals
- 2022–23: Vanessa Fudalla (RB Leipzig) – 20 goals
- 2023–24: Larissa Mühlhaus (Hamburger SV) – 20 goals
- 2024–25: Lisa Heiseler (1. FC Union Berlin) – 22 goals
- 2025–26: Vital Kats (1. FSV Mainz 05) – 22 goals
