= Holstein Kiel (women) =

- Full name: Kieler Sportvereinigung Holstein von 1900 e.V.
- Founded: 2004; 22 years ago
- Ground: Waldwiese
- Capacity: 2,000
- Manager: Stefan Fischer
- League: Regionalliga Nord
- 2025–26: 1st
Home colours	Away colours

Holstein Kiel is a women's association football club from Kiel, Germany. It is part of the Holstein Kiel club.

== History ==
Holstein Kiel was founded in 2004 after the dissolution of the Regionalliga club SV-TUS Felde, in addition to a collaboration with TSV Schilksee. In their inaugural season in 2004–05, they emerged as champions of the Regionalliga Nord, earning promotion to the 2. Bundesliga. In the meantime, their player Nina Jokuschies became a World Cup champion with the Germany U19 team in the 2004 tournament.

The club competed in the 2. Bundesliga until 2011, followed by experiencing a series of promotions and relegations until 2016, when they returned to the Regionalliga Nord.newspaper=FuPa In 2018, there were plans to incorporate the women's football department into VfB Kiel for the 2018–19 season for financial reasons. However, these plans were withdrawn and an agreement was reached to continue working with KSV Holstein. The club finished top of the 2025–26 Regionalliga Nord but lost 4–0 on aggregate to 1. FC Köln II in the promotion playoffs.

== Squad ==
As of 27 June 2026

Note: Flags indicate national team as defined under FIFA eligibility rules; some limited exceptions apply. Players may hold more than one non-FIFA nationality.

No.	Pos.	Nation	Player
1	GK	GER	Emma Nentwich
3	DF	GER	Jasmin Grosnick
5	DF	GER	Laura Hasse
6	DF	GER	Katinka Siegesmund
7	MF	GER	Samanta Carone
8	FW	GER	Ronja Jürgensen
9	MF	GER	Janine Minta
10	FW	GER	Sarah Begunk (captain)
11	FW	GER	Paula Harder
12	DF	GER	Saskija Eigebrecht
13	FW	GER	Leonie Kuhrt
14	MF	GER	Zoe Tolksdorf

No.	Pos.	Nation	Player
15	MF	GER	Aryanna Naward
17	FW	ALB	Arjela Lako
18	MF	GER	Emma Jöhnk
19	DF	GER	Luiza Zimmermann
20	FW	GER	Ines Zaghdoudi
21	MF	GER	Lea Althof
22	GK	GER	Lela Naward
23	FW	GER	Stine Merschmann
24	FW	GER	Kira Hasse
25	DF	GER	Alia Rendant
26	DF	GER	Luisa Erbar

== Current staff ==
As of 1 July 2025

Coaching staff
(Germany) Stefan Fischer	Head coach
(Germany) Axel Mommer (Germany) Gesa Köllmer	Assistant coach
(Germany) Lovis Lorenz	Athletic trainer
Managerial staff
(Germany) André Jeschkeit	Sports Director and Head of women's department
(Germany) Phillip Portwich	Organizational staff
Medical department
(Germany) Henriette Hirnstein (Germany) Mirijam Thümling	Physiotherapist

== Honours ==
Regionalliga Nord

- Champions: 2005, 2012, 2014

Schleswig-Holstein Cup

- Champions: 2005, 2014, 2017, 2018, 2019, 2022, 2023, 2025
