= SV Meppen (women) =

- Founded: 1 July 2011; 15 years ago
- Ground: Hänsch-Arena
- Capacity: 13,696
- President: Heinz Speet
- Head coach: Carin Bakhuis
- League: 2. Bundesliga
- 2025–26: 2. Bundesliga, 4th of 14
Home colours	Away colours	Third colours

SV Meppen is a women's association football club from Meppen, Germany. It is part of the SV Meppen club.

== History ==
=== SV Victoria Gersten ===
Founded in 1947, SV Victoria Gersten's women's team earned promotion to the then second-tier Oberliga Nord in 1993. Despite finishing second in 2000, their attempts to secure promotion to the Bundesliga fell short during the promotion round. The club faced a similar outcome two years later, again missing out on promotion after finishing as runners-up. In 2004, SV Victoria Gersten became one of the inaugural members of the 2. Bundesliga.

=== SV Meppen ===
To meet the increasing demands of the 2. Bundesliga, SV Victoria Gersten's women's football department joined SV Meppen for the 2010–11 season. In the suspended 2019–20 season, disrupted by the COVID-19 pandemic in Germany, SV Meppen secured a fourth-place finish in the second division. Despite this, they were promoted to the Bundesliga because both VfL Wolfsburg II and 1899 Hoffenheim II were ineligible for promotion. However, their top-flight campaign in the 2020–21 season concluded with an 11th-place finish and relegation to the second division. Undeterred, they bounced back by clinching the 2021–22 2. Bundesliga title, earning a return to the Bundesliga. Unfortunately, their second Bundesliga stint ended with another relegation after an 11th-place finish.

== Squad ==
As of 12 July 2026

Note: Flags indicate national team as defined under FIFA eligibility rules; some limited exceptions apply. Players may hold more than one non-FIFA nationality.

No.	Pos.	Nation	Player
3	DF	GER	Nina Rolfes (captain)
9	MF	GER	Marleen Kropp
10	MF	GER	Anouk Blaschka
12	DF	GER	Sarah Hagg
14	MF	GER	Bente Marie Bode
15	MF	GER	Sonja Lux
17	MF	USA	Genesis Castrellon
18	MF	GER	Lana Hubbeling
—	DF	SUR	Anne Bhaguerth
21	MF	GER	Maren Haberäcker
22	MF	GER	Lilly Damm

No.	Pos.	Nation	Player
24	DF	GER	Lilly Bartke
28	GK	SUI	Isabel Rutishauser
30	GK	GER	Carla Steenken
—	GK	GER	Leonie Dalming
—	GK	GER	Lisa Venrath
—	DF	GER	Anncharlotte Hampel
—	DF	NED	Kyra Speel
—	MF	GER	Rahel Lang
—	MF	GER	Josefine Wehage
—	MF	NED	Lotte Masseling
—	FW	GER	Mirja Langen
—	FW	GER	Lucy Karwatzki

== Former Players ==
- (Australia) Beattie Goad
- (New Zealand) Maya Hahn
- (Bulgaria) Velislava Dimitrova
- (Norway) Madelen Holme
- (Ghana) Betty Anane
