= Frauen-Regionalliga =

Regionalliga
- Country: Germany
- Confederation: UEFA (Europe)
- Number of clubs: 63
- Level on pyramid: 3
- Promotion to: 2. Bundesliga
- Relegation to: Verbandsliga (Nord, Südwest, West); Landesliga (Nordost); Oberliga (Nord, Süd)
- Domestic cup: DFB-Pokal Frauen
- Current champions: Holstein Kiel (Nord); Hertha BSC (Nordost); 1. FC Köln II (West); 1. FC Saarbrücken (Südwest); TSG 1899 Hoffenheim II (Süd) (2025–26)
- Most championships: 1. FFC Niederkirchen; (7 times)
- Current: 2026–27 Frauen-Regionalliga

The Frauen-Regionalliga is the third tier of German women's association football. The Frauen-Regionalliga is made up of five separate leagues. Until 2017, the champion of each league was promoted to the 2. Frauen-Bundesliga for the next season, so were the winners of two promotion groups in 2018. From 2021 to 2024, the Regionalliga Süd champion and two winners of promotion play-offs have qualified for next season's 2. Bundesliga. All five league champions earned promotion in 2025, with the play-offs returning in 2026.

== Mode ==
In all divisions a season consists of two rounds. A club meets every other club one time in each round, once at home and once away. The number of games thus depends on the number of teams in the division, ranging from ten in the south to fourteen in the west. The season typically starts in August or September, with the first round finishing in December. The second round then starts in February and ends in May or June. Occasionally the first games of the second round are held in December, though.

The final standings are determined by points a club has gained during a season. A win is worth 3 points, a draw 1, and a loss 0. The tiebreakers are in descending order goal difference, goals for, and head-to-head results. If the tie cannot be broken a tiebreaking game is held.

Until the end of the 2016–17 season the divisional champions were promoted the 2nd Bundesliga. After the 2017–18 season, two groups of four teams played a promotion round in which the group winners were also promoted, as the 2nd Bundesliga contracted to one division for the following season. Since 2018–19, the three winners of two-legged matches earn promotion. If a division champion declines to participate in the play-offs, its intended opponent is promoted instead and if the champion, especially a reserve team of a 2nd Bundesliga club, is ineligible, the next-placed, eligible club accedes to the promotion round. If the play-off winner declines or is refused promotion, the loser qualifies automatically for the 2nd Bundesliga in the next season and if the play-off loser also declines or is denied, no team is promoted and the number of relegations from the 2nd Bundesliga is reduced.

There is no rule to which division of the 2nd Bundesliga a team is allocated and the German Football Association decides that from season to season. The number of teams relegated to the third tier depends on the clubs relegated from the 2nd Bundesliga. In a season no clubs might be relegated to a specific division of the Regionalliga while another division receives three new teams due to relegation. Promotion and relegation between the Regionalliga and the league beneath serves as a cushion to keep the divisions of the Regionalliga at the size they are supposed to have.

For the 2024–25 season only, all five Regionalliga division winners were promoted directly to the 2nd Bundesliga due to Frauen-Bundesliga's expansion to 14 teams in 2025–26 by promoting three teams from the second division and relegating one from the top division along with the retention of the current rule of three teams relegated from the 2nd Bundesliga.

== Regionalliga Nord ==
The Regionalliga Nord is the highest regional division in northern Germany. Teams belonging to one of the regional football associations of Lower Saxony, Schleswig-Holstein, Hamburg, or Bremen compete in the league. The division comprises fourteen teams.

=== History ===
Until 1986 the highest leagues in northern Germany were the Landesligas, one each for Bremen, Hamburg, Lower Saxony, and Schleswig-Holstein. The champions of these divisions automatically qualified for the national championship. When in 1986 the Oberliga Nord was established the best teams from each regional association were admitted to the new league. Although the best team from each association still qualified for the national championship this was determined by the final standings of the Oberliga Nord.

When in 1990 the Frauen-Bundesliga was incepted the Regionalliga automatically moved to the second tier. The best teams from the Regionalliga qualified for the Bundesliga Nord in its first season. Afterwards the champions of the division had to play against teams from the Regionalliga West and Nordost for promotion to the Bundesliga Nord. Since 1997 teams thus qualify for the unified Bundesliga. In 1994 the name of the league was changed to Regionalliga, but the change incurred no further consequences. With the introduction of the 2nd Bundesliga in 2004 the Regionalliga Nord moved to the third tier.

== Regionalliga Nordost ==
The Regionalliga Nordost is the highest regional division in north-eastern Germany. Teams belonging to one of the regional football associations of Berlin, Brandenburg, Mecklenburg-Vorpommern, Saxony, Saxony-Anhalt, or Thuringia compete in the league. The division comprises twelve teams.

=== History ===
The Oberliga was established in 1990 as the national league of the GDR. When the GDR was united with West Germany in the same year play in the Oberliga continued. Late in 1990 the GDR football association was merged into the German Football Association and—just as in men's football—at the end of the season the top two teams of the former GDR top division were admitted to the Bundesliga. Afterwards the teams from West Berlin were integrated into the Oberliga Nordost. In the following seasons the champion from the Regionalliga Nordost had to compete with the champions of the Regionalligas Nord and West for promotion to the Bundesliga Nord.

Since 1997 teams thus qualify for the unified Bundesliga. In 1995 the name of the league was changed to Regionalliga, but the change incurred no further consequences. With the introduction of the 2nd Bundesliga in 2004 the Regionalliga Nordost moved to the third tier.

== Regionalliga Süd ==
The Regionalliga Süd is the highest regional division in southern Germany. Teams belonging to one of the regional football associations of Bavaria, Baden, South Baden, Württemberg, and Hesse compete in the league. The division comprises fourteen teams.

=== History ===
Until 1986 the highest leagues in southern Germany were the Oberligas, one each for Bavaria, Hesse, and Baden-Württemberg. The champions of these divisions had to play against teams from the other Landesligas in South Germany for promotion to the Bundesliga. When the 2nd Bundesliga was incepted in 2004 the Regionalliga Süd was dissolved and the teams were either promoted to the 2nd Bundesliga or relegated to the Oberligas. The Regionalliga was reestablished in 2007 and again comprises the best teams from Bavaria, Hessen, and Baden-Württemberg.

== Regionalliga Südwest ==
The Regionalliga Südwest is the highest regional division in south-western Germany. Teams belonging to one of the regional football associations of Rhineland, Saarland, or Southwest compete in the league. The division comprises fourteen teams.

=== History ===
Until 1990 the highest leagues in south-western Germany were the Landesligas, one each for Rhineland, Saarland, and Southwest. The champions of these division automatically qualified for the national championship. When in 1990 the Bundesliga was incepted the Landesligas automatically moved to the second tier. The best teams from the Landesligas in south-western Germany played in relegation playoffs against each other for promotion to the Bundesliga South. In 1996 the Oberliga Südwest was established as a league between the Bundesliga and the Landesligas. The best teams from the Landesligas Rhineland, Saarland, and Southwest qualified for this league. Although the southwestern region was then presented by only one division the champion of that division had to play relegation playoffs to be admitted to the Bundesliga as the Bundesliga divisions were merged in 1997 to form a unified league. Only two slots for promotion were thus available.

In 2000 the name of the league was changed to Regionalliga, but the change incurred no further consequences. With the introduction of the 2nd Bundesliga in 2004 the Regionalliga Südwest moved to the third tier.

== Regionalliga West ==
The Regionalliga West is the highest regional division in western Germany. Teams belonging to one of the regional football associations of Middle Rhine, Lower Rhine, or Westphalia compete in the league. Essentially that means, that teams from North Rhine-Westphalia compete in the league. The division comprises fourteen teams.

=== History ===
From its inception in 1985 until 1990 the Regionalliga West was the highest league for women's football in western Germany. The champion qualified for the German women's football championship. When in 2000 the Bundesliga was incepted the best teams of the Regionalliga automatically qualified for the northern division of the Bundesliga. Afterwards the champion from the western division of the Regionalliga had to compete in relegation playoffs with the champion of the northern and north-eastern divisions for a spot in the Bundesliga. When the Bundesliga was reformed to a single division in 1997 the Western German champion Wattenscheid 09 had to vie for qualification with the north-eastern champion as well as two teams which had achieved midtable results in the 1996–97 Bundesliga season. In 2003 the Regionalliga moved to the third tier when the 2. Bundesliga was established.

== Champions ==
=== 1985–1986 ===
Season	Regionalliga West
1985–86	TSV Siegen

=== 1986–1990 ===
Season	Regionalliga Nord	Regionalliga West
1986–87	Lorbeer Rothenburgsort	TSV Siegen
1987–88	Lorbeer Rothenburgsort	SSG Bergisch Gladbach
1988–89	Fortuna Sachsenroß Hannover	TSV Siegen
1989–90	VfR Eintracht Wolfsburg	TSV Siegen

=== 1990–1996 ===
Season	Regionalliga Nord	Regionalliga Nordost	Regionalliga West
1990–91	TV Jahn Delmenhorst	FF USV Jena	Grün-Weiß Brauweiler
1991–92	TV Jahn Delmenhorst	1. FFC Turbine Potsdam	STV Lövenich
1992–93	Schmalfelder SV	1. FC Lübars	FC Rumeln-Kaldenhausen
1993–94	VfL Wittekind Wildeshausen	1. FFC Turbine Potsdam	SG Wattenscheid 09
1994–95	TV Jahn Delmenhorst	Polizei SV Rostock	SpVgg Oberaußem-Fortuna
1995–96	VfL Wittekind Wildeshausen	Hertha Zehlendorf	SG Wattenscheid 09

=== 1996–2000 ===
Season	Regionalliga Nord	Regionalliga Nordost	Regionalliga West	Regionalliga Südwest
1996–97	TV Jahn Delmenhorst	Hertha Zehlendorf	SG Wattenscheid 09	SC 07 Bad Neuenahr
1997–98	WSV Wendschott	Hertha Zehlendorf	Rot-Weiß Hillen	TuS Ahrbach
1998–99	Hamburger SV	Hertha Zehlendorf	SpVgg Oberaußem-Fortuna	TuS Ahrbach
1999–00	Hamburger SV	Tennis Borussia Berlin	FFC Heike Rheine	1. FC Saarbrücken II

=== 2000–2004 ===
Season	Regionalliga Nord	Regionalliga Nordost	Regionalliga West	Regionalliga Südwest	Regionalliga Süd
2000–01	Hamburger SV	Tennis Borussia Berlin	SpVgg Oberaußem-Fortuna	TuS Niederkirchen	SC Freiburg
2001–02	SV Victoria Gersten	Tennis Borussia Berlin	SpVgg Oberaußem-Fortuna	TuS Niederkirchen	1. FC Nürnberg
2002–03	Hamburger SV	FF USV Jena	FC Gütersloh	1. FC Saarbrücken	SC Sand
2003–04	SV Victoria Gersten	Tennis Borussia Berlin	SGS Essen	TuS Niederkirchen	TSV Crailsheim

=== 2004–2007 ===
Season	Regionalliga Nord	Regionalliga Nordost	Regionalliga West	Regionalliga Südwest
2004–05	Holstein Kiel	FFC Neubrandenburg	TuS Köln rrh.	TuS Niederkirchen
2005–06	Hamburger SV II	Lokomotive Leipzig	HSV Borussia Friedenstal	SC 07 Bad Neuenahr II
2006–07	FFC Oldesloe	1. FC Union Berlin	FCR 2001 Duisburg II	SV Dirmingen

=== 2007– ===
Season	Regionalliga Nord	Regionalliga Nordost	Regionalliga West	Regionalliga Südwest	Regionalliga Süd
2007–08	Mellendorfer TV	FF USV Jena II	SGS Essen II	FSV Jägersburg	FV Löchgau
2008–09	SV Werder Bremen	Magdeburger FFC	FFC Brauweiler Pulheim	TuS Wörrstadt	Bayern Munich II
2009–10	BV Cloppenburg	Leipziger FC 07	1. FFC Recklinghausen 2003	1. FFC 08 Niederkirchen	TSG 1899 Hoffenheim
2010–11	Mellendorfer TV	FF USV Jena II	Borussia Mönchengladbach	SC 07 Bad Neuenahr II	ETSV Würzburg
2011–12	Holstein Kiel	Blau-Weiß Hohen Neuendorf	1. FFC Recklinghausen 2003	SV Bardenbach	SC Sand
2012–13	VfL Wolfsburg II	Lichterfelder FC	VfL Bochum	TuS Wörrstadt	SV 67 Weinberg
2013–14	Holstein Kiel	SV Eintracht Leipzig-Süd	Alemannia Aachen	TSV Schott Mainz	TSG 1899 Hoffenheim II
2014–15	SV Henstedt-Ulzburg	Blau-Weiß Hohen Neuendorf	Borussia Mönchengladbach	TSV Schott Mainz	Eintracht Wetzlar
2015–16	Bramfelder SV	1. FC Union Berlin	Arminia Bielefeld	1. FFC 08 Niederkirchen	SC Sand II
2016–17	SV Werder Bremen II	FF USV Jena II	1. FC Köln II	SG Andernach	SC Freiburg II
2017–18	Bramfelder SV	1. FC Union Berlin	Borussia Bocholt	TuS Issel	Eintracht Frankfurt
2018–19	SV Werder Bremen II	1. FC Union Berlin	Arminia Bielefeld	SG Andernach	FC Ingolstadt 04
2019–20	SV Henstedt-Ulzburg	RB Leipzig	1. FC Köln II	1. FFC Niederkirchen	SC Freiburg II
2020–21	No champions. Season abandoned during the COVID-19 pandemic in Germany.				
2021–22	Hamburger SV	1. FFC Turbine Potsdam II	1. FC Köln II	1. FC Saarbrücken	SC Freiburg II
2022–23	Hamburger SV	FC Viktoria 1889 Berlin	Borussia Mönchengladbach	SV Elversberg	SV 67 Weinberg
2023–24	SV Henstedt-Ulzburg	1. FC Union Berlin	VfL Bochum	1. FSV Mainz 05	SC Freiburg II
2024–25	Hamburger SV II	FC Viktoria 1889 Berlin	VfR Warbeyen	1. FSV Mainz 05	VfB Stuttgart
2025–26	Holstein Kiel	Hertha BSC	1. FC Köln II	1. FC Saarbrücken	TSG 1899 Hoffenheim II
