= 1. FC Saarbrücken (women) =

- Full name: 1. Fußball-Club Saarbrücken e.V.
- Nicknames: De FC, die Molschder
- Founded: 1997
- Ground: Kieselhumes
- Capacity: 12,000
- Chairman: Paul Borgard
- Manager: Winfried Klein
- League: Regionalliga Südwest
- 2024–25: 2nd
Home colours	Away colours

1. Fußball-Club Saarbrücken is a women's association football team from Saarbrücken, Germany. It is part of the 1. FC Saarbrücken club.

== History ==
In 1990, the women of VfR 09 Saarbrücken were a founding member of the Bundesliga. In 1997, the women's football team of VfR 09 Saarbrücken left VfR to join 1. FC Saarbrücken. Up to 2010–11, the team had played in 16 Bundesliga seasons, since then they played in the 2. Bundesliga and Regionalliga Südwest. The team's greatest success was an appearance in the 2008 DFB Cup final where they lost 5–1 to 1. FFC Frankfurt.

== Current squad ==
As of 1 February 2025

Note: Flags indicate national team as defined under FIFA eligibility rules; some limited exceptions apply. Players may hold more than one non-FIFA nationality.

No.	Pos.	Nation	Player
1	GK	GER	Elena Bläser
2	MF	GER	Stella Koster
4	MF	GER	Jennifer Klein
6	MF	GER	Lilly Marie Kintzig
7	FW	GER	Chelsea Agyei
8	DF	GER	Anna Körner
9	FW	GER	Lena Wind
10	MF	GER	Lea Körner
11	MF	GER	Celine Wagner
12	DF	GER	Jule Schillo
13	DF	GER	Jasmin Demange
14	MF	GER	Anna Lena Strauß
15	DF	GER	Madita Schmitt

No.	Pos.	Nation	Player
16	DF	GER	Kristin Hauck
17	MF	GER	Lena Ripperger (captain)
18	FW	GER	Nora Clausen
19	DF	GER	Leonie Michelle Biehl
21	DF	GER	Kimberly Ruhstorfer
22	DF	GER	Hannah Wünsche
23	DF	GER	Lara Marie Recktenwald
24	FW	GER	Emma Wagner
26	DF	GER	Laura Eicher
27	GK	GER	Emma Dörr
28	DF	GER	Larissa Theil
30	MF	GER	Marie Steimer

== Former internationals ==
- (Iceland) Sif Atladóttir
- (Nigeria) Cynthia Uwak
