= 1995–96 in German football =

Football in Germany
- Season: 1995–96

Men's football
- Bundesliga: Borussia Dortmund
- 2. Bundesliga: VfL Bochum
- DFB-Pokal: 1. FC Kaiserslautern
- DFB-Supercup: Borussia Dortmund

Women's football
- Frauen-Bundesliga: TSV Siegen
- DFB-Pokal: FSV Frankfurt

The 1995–96 season was the 86th season of competitive football in Germany.

== National teams ==
=== Germany national football team ===
==== UEFA Euro 1996 qualification ====
Win Draw Loss

Date	Venue	Location	Opponent	Score F–A	Att.	Goalscorers and disciplined players		Ref.
Date	Venue	Location	Opponent	Score F–A	Att.	Germany	Opponent	Ref.
6 September 1995	Frankenstadion	Nuremberg, Germany	Georgia	4–1	44,000	Möller 39'; Ziege 57' (yellow card) 62'; Kirsten 62'; Babbel 72'	Ketsbaia 28'; Shelia (yellow card) 57'	
8 October 1995	Ulrich-Haberland-Stadion	Leverkusen, Germany	Moldova	6–1	18,500	Stroenco 16' (o.g.); Helmer 18'; Sammer 24', 72'; Möller 47', 61'	Rebeja 82'; Ivanov (yellow card) 87'	
11 October 1995	The Arms Park	Cardiff, Wales	Wales	2–1	27,000	Melville 75' (o.g.); Ziege (yellow card) 76'; Klinsmann 81'; Sammer (yellow card) 82'	Southall (yellow card) 3'; Pembridge 23'; Blake (yellow card) 40'; Helmer 79' (o.g.)	
15 November 1995	Olympiastadion	Berlin, Germany	Bulgaria	3–1	75,841	Klinsmann (yellow card) 35' (goal) 50', 76' (pen.); Häßler 56'; Freund (yellow card) 67'	Balakov (yellow card) 36'; Stoichov 47'; Dartilov (yellow card) 55'; Popov (yellow card) 75'	

==== UEFA Euro 1996 ====
Win Draw Loss

Round	Date Kick–off time	Venue	Location	Opponent	Score F–A	Att.	Goalscorers and disciplined players		Ref.
Round	Date Kick–off time	Venue	Location	Opponent	Score F–A	Att.	Germany	Opponent	Ref.
Group C	9 June 1996; 17:00 (BST)	Old Trafford	Manchester, England	Czech Republic	2–0	37,300	Ziege 26' (yellow card) 28'; Möller 32' (yellow card) 58'; Kuntz (yellow card) 52'; Babbel (yellow card) 59'; Reuter (yellow card) 69'; Häßler (yellow card) 77'	Bejbl (yellow card) 19'; Nedvěd (yellow card) 45'; Kadlec (yellow card) 67'; Drulák (yellow card) 67'	
Group C	16 June 1996; 15:00 (BST)	Old Trafford	Manchester, England	Russia	3–0	50,760	Babbel (yellow card) 16'; Bierhoff (yellow card) 31'; Sammer 56'; Klinsmann 77', 90'	Kanchelskis (yellow card) 12'; Onopko (yellow card) 30'; Kovtun (red card) 70'	
Group C	19 June 1996; 19:30 (BST)	Old Trafford	Manchester, England	Italy	0–0	53,740	Strunz (red card) 59'	Casiraghi (yellow card) 18'	
Quarter-finals	23 June 1996; 15:00 (BST)	Old Trafford	Manchester, England	Croatia	2–1	43,412	Sammer (yellow card) 5' (goal) 59'; Klinsmann (yellow card) 7' (goal) 20' (pen.)	Šuker 51'; Štimac (red card) 56'	
Semi-finals	26 June 1996; 19:30 (BST)	Wembley	London, England	England	1–1 (6–5 p.)	75,862	Kuntz 16'; Reuter (yellow card) 46'; Möller (yellow card) 80'	Shearer 3'; Gascoigne (yellow card) 73'	
Semi-finals	26 June 1996; 19:30 (BST)	Wembley	London, England	England	1–1 (6–5 p.)	75,862	Häßler (penalty scored); Strunz (penalty scored); Reuter (penalty scored); Ziege (penalty scored); Kuntz (penalty scored); Möller (penalty scored)	Shearer (penalty scored); Platt (penalty scored); Pearce (penalty scored); Gascoigne (penalty scored); Sheringham (penalty scored); Southgate (penalty missed)	
Final	30 June 1996; 19:00 (BST)	Wembley	London, England	Czech Republic	2–1 (aet)	73,611	Helmer (yellow card) 63'; Sammer (yellow card) 69'; Bierhoff 73' 95'; Ziege (yellow card) 91'	Horňák (yellow card) 47'; Berger 59' (pen.)	

==== Friendly matches ====
Win Draw Loss

Date	Venue	Location	Opponent	Score F–A	Att.	Goalscorers		Ref.
Date	Venue	Location	Opponent	Score F–A	Att.	Germany	Opponent	Ref.
23 August 1995	King Baudouin Stadium	Brussels, Belgium	Belgium	2–1	35,000	Möller 6'; Bobic 84'	Goossens 17'	
15 December 1995	Johannesburg Stadium	Johannesburg, South Africa	South Africa	0–0	30,000	—	—	
21 February 1996	Estádio das Antas	Porto, Portugal	Portugal	2–1	25,000	Möller 14', 65'	Folha 52'	
27 March 1996	Olympiastadion	Munich, Germany	Denmark	2–0	26,000	Bierhoff 44', 61'	—	
24 April 1996	De Kuip	Rotterdam, Netherlands	Netherlands	1–0	40,000	Klinsmann 19' (pen.)	—	
29 May 1996	Windsor Park	Belfast, Northern Ireland	Northern Ireland	1–1	11,700	Scholl 77'	O'Boyle 76'	
1 June 1996	Gottlieb-Daimler-Stadion	Stuttgart, Germany	France	0–1	53,100	—	Blanc 6'	
4 June 1996	Carl-Benz-Stadion	Mannheim, Germany	Liechtenstein	9–1	26,000	Möller 4', 64'; Kuntz 18', 90'; Bierhoff 22'; Ziege 38'; Sammer 48'; Kohler 53'; Klinsmann 85'	Pérez 69'	

=== Germany women's national football team ===
==== UEFA Women's Euro 1997 qualification ====
Win Draw Loss

Date	Location	Opponent	Score F–A	Att.	Goalscorers		Ref.
Date	Location	Opponent	Score F–A	Att.	Germany	Opponent	Ref.
20 September 1995	Tampere, Finland	Finland	3–0	1,000	Wiegmann 15', 84'; Mohr 66'	—	
25 October 1995	Bratislava, Slovakia	Slovakia	3–0	500	Prinz 16'; Mohr 54'; Neid 79'	—	
11 April 1996	Unterhaching, Germany	Slovakia	2–0	3,000	Wiegmann 69'; Fitschen 87'	—	
2 May 1996	Jena, Germany	Norway	1–3	2,500	Brocker 9'	Haugen 15', 31'; Medalen 51'	
5 May 1996	Gifhorn, Germany	Finland	6–0	3,500	Smisek 10'; Mohr 30', 44'; Wunderlich 45'; Minnert 56'; Austermühl 68' (pen.)	—	
6 June 1996	Trondheim, Norway	Norway	0–0	2,790	—	—	

==== Friendly matches ====
Win Draw Loss

Date	Location	Opponent	Score F–A	Att.	Goalscorers		Ref.
Date	Location	Opponent	Score F–A	Att.	Germany	Opponent	Ref.
14 March 1996	Decatur, United States	United States	0–6	4,500	—	Overbeck 20'; Parlow 32'; Chastain 45'; Milbrett 48', 75'; Hamm 57'	
16 March 1996	Davidson, United States	United States	0–2	3,500	—	Milbrett 17'; Lilly 89'	
28 June 1996	Mannheim, Germany	Iceland	8–0	1,000	Mohr 3', 8', 84'; Tschöke 18'; Nardenbach 27'; Voss-Tecklenburg 37'; Brocker 58'; Bornschein 58'	—	
30 June 1996	Pforzheim, Germany	Iceland	3–0	900	Wiegmann 54'; Mohr 60'; P. Wunderlich 76'	—	

== League season ==
=== Men ===
==== Bundesliga ====
Pos	Team	Pld	W	D	L	GF	GA	GD	Pts	Qualification or relegation
1	Borussia Dortmund (C)	34	19	11	4	76	38	+38	68	Qualification to Champions League group stage
2	Bayern Munich	34	19	5	10	66	46	+20	62	Qualification to UEFA Cup first round
3	Schalke 04	34	14	14	6	45	36	+9	56	Qualification to UEFA Cup first round
4	Borussia Mönchengladbach	34	15	8	11	52	51	+1	53	Qualification to UEFA Cup first round
5	Hamburger SV	34	12	14	8	52	47	+5	50	Qualification to UEFA Cup first round
6	Hansa Rostock	34	13	10	11	47	43	+4	49	
7	Karlsruher SC	34	12	12	10	53	47	+6	48	Qualification to Intertoto Cup group stage (Note: As Hansa Rostock did not apply for the UEFA Intertoto Cup, their place was transferred to Stuttgart.)
8	1860 Munich	34	11	12	11	52	46	+6	45	Qualification to Intertoto Cup group stage
9	Werder Bremen	34	10	14	10	39	42	−3	44	Qualification to Intertoto Cup group stage
10	VfB Stuttgart	34	10	13	11	59	62	−3	43	Qualification to Intertoto Cup group stage
11	SC Freiburg	34	11	9	14	30	41	−11	42	
12	1. FC Köln	34	9	13	12	33	35	−2	40	
13	Fortuna Düsseldorf	34	8	16	10	40	47	−7	40	
14	Bayer Leverkusen	34	8	14	12	37	38	−1	38	
15	FC St. Pauli	34	9	11	14	43	51	−8	38	
16	1. FC Kaiserslautern (Note: After being demoted by league place, Kaiserslautern won the DFB-Pokal 1995–96 and thus qualified for the Cup Winners' Cup.) (R)	34	6	18	10	31	37	−6	36	Cup Winners' Cup and relegation to 2. Bundesliga
17	Eintracht Frankfurt (R)	34	7	11	16	43	68	−25	32	Relegation to 2. Bundesliga
18	KFC Uerdingen (R)	34	5	11	18	33	56	−23	26	Relegation to 2. Bundesliga

Source: www.dfb.de
Rules for classification: 1) points; 2) goal difference; 3) number of goals scored.
(C) Champions; (R) Relegated

==== 2. Bundesliga ====
Pos	Team	Pld	W	D	L	GF	GA	GD	Pts	Promotion or relegation
1	VfL Bochum (C, P)	34	21	6	7	68	30	+38	69	Promotion to Bundesliga
2	Arminia Bielefeld (P)	34	16	9	9	55	45	+10	57	Promotion to Bundesliga
3	MSV Duisburg (P)	34	15	11	8	55	37	+18	56	Promotion to Bundesliga
4	SpVgg Unterhaching	34	14	10	10	52	38	+14	52	
5	FSV Zwickau	34	15	4	15	39	48	−9	49	
6	Carl Zeiss Jena	34	13	9	12	49	54	−5	48	
7	Waldhof Mannheim	34	13	7	14	49	47	+2	46	
8	Fortuna Köln	34	12	10	12	37	37	0	46	
9	VfB Leipzig	34	13	6	15	35	49	−14	45	
10	SV Meppen	34	10	14	10	45	43	+2	44	
11	Mainz 05	34	12	8	14	37	41	−4	44	
12	VfL Wolfsburg	34	10	14	10	41	46	−5	44	
13	VfB Lübeck	34	13	5	16	40	45	−5	44	
14	Hertha BSC	34	11	12	11	37	35	+2	45	
15	Chemnitzer FC (R)	34	11	9	14	43	51	−8	42	Relegation to Regionalliga (Note: Hannover 96 was relegated to Regionalliga Nord. Chemnitzer FC was relegated to Regionalliga Nordost. 1. FC Nürnberg was relegated to Regionalliga Süd. SG Wattenscheid 09 was relegated to Regionalliga West/Südwest.)
16	Hannover 96 (R)	34	10	7	17	38	48	−10	37	Relegation to Regionalliga
17	1. FC Nürnberg (R)	34	9	12	13	33	40	−7	39	Relegation to Regionalliga
18	SG Wattenscheid 09 (R)	34	8	7	19	38	57	−19	31	Relegation to Regionalliga

Source: kicker
Rules for classification: 1) points; 2) goal difference; 3) number of goals scored.
(C) Champions; (P) Promoted; (R) Relegated

=== Women ===
==== Bundesliga ====
Northern conference
Pos	Team	Pld	W	D	L	GF	GA	GD	Pts	Qualification or relegation
1	Grün-Weiß Brauweiler	18	15	1	2	80	17	+63	46	Participant of the semi-final
2	TSV Siegen	18	14	3	1	70	10	+60	45	Participant of the semi-final
3	FC Rumeln-Kaldenhausen	18	12	3	3	59	23	+36	39	
4	Eintracht Rheine	18	9	5	4	38	24	+14	32	
5	Fortuna Sachsenroß Hannover	18	7	2	9	31	50	−19	23	
6	Turbine Potsdam	18	5	6	7	29	41	−12	21	
7	Tennis Borussia Berlin	18	5	4	9	24	33	−9	19	
8	VfR Eintracht Wolfsburg	18	5	4	9	18	40	−22	19	
9	Polizei SV Rostock (Note: Promoted from the Regionalliga last season)	18	1	3	14	18	57	−39	6	Relegated to Regional-/Oberliga
10	Rot-Weiß Hillen	18	0	3	15	16	88	−72	3	Relegated to Regional-/Oberliga

Notes:

Southern conference
Pos	Team	Pld	W	D	L	GF	GA	GD	Pts	Qualification or relegation
1	FSV Frankfurt	18	16	1	1	99	6	+93	49	Participant of the semi-final
2	SG Praunheim	18	11	6	1	31	11	+20	39	Participant of the semi-final
3	TuS Niederkirchen	18	11	2	5	49	26	+23	35	
4	Klinge Seckach	18	10	4	4	28	17	+11	34	
5	TuS Ahrbach	18	6	5	7	22	31	−9	23	
6	VfL Sindelfingen	18	6	2	10	32	40	−8	20	
7	VfR 09 Saarbrücken	18	4	6	8	23	41	−18	18	
8	TSV Crailsheim (Note: Promoted from the Regionalliga last season)	18	2	8	8	7	27	−20	14	
9	TuS Wörrstadt	18	3	2	13	17	61	−44	11	Relegated to Regional-/Oberliga
10	SC 07 Bad Neuenahr	18	2	2	14	17	65	−48	8	Relegated to Regional-/Oberliga
