= 1991–92 DFB-Pokal Frauen =

Tournament details
- Country: Germany
- Teams: 48

Final positions
- Champions: FSV Frankfurt
- Runners-up: TSV Siegen

Tournament statistics
- Matches played: 47
- Goals scored: 223 (4.74 per match)

The Frauen DFB-Pokal 1991–92 was the 12th season of the cup competition, Germany's second-most important title in women's football. In the final which was held in Berlin on 23 June 1992 FSV Frankfurt defeated TSV Siegen 1–0, thus claiming their third cup title.

In this edition of the cup for the first time games that were a draw after extra time were not repeated. A penalty shootout decided the game instead. Also for the first time all clubs from the Bundesliga were automatically qualified and clubs from the former GDR were eligible to compete in the DFB-Pokal. Finally Gertrud Regus became the first woman to be the referee in a DFB-Pokal final.

== First round ==
Several clubs had byes in the first round. Those clubs were automatically qualified for the 2nd round of the cup.

SV Wieskirchen	0 – 7	FSV Frankfurt
Wismut Chemnitz	0 – 5	Wismut Aue
VfL Wittekind Wildeshausen	1 – 0	Uni SV Jena
Turbine Potsdam	2 – 4	Schmalfelder SV
TuS Binzen	0 – 5	Bayern Munich
Wittenseer SV	0 – 3	SSG Bergisch Gladbach
SpVgg Landshut	0 – 2	TuS Ahrbach
Wattenscheid 09	0 – 5	VfR Eintracht Wolfsburg
SC 07 Bad Neuenahr	4 – 3	SG Praunheim
VfR Rheinfelden	0 – 7	VfL Sindelfingen
Hamburg	1 – 6	Grün-Weiß Brauweiler
TuS Erbsdorf	0 – 2	Fortuna Sachsenroß Hannover
Polizei SV Bremen	1 – 2	Tennis Borussia Berlin
SV Wilhelmshaven	1 – 1	KBC Duisburg	(aet, 6–5 on penalties)
Motor Halle	0 – 7	Klinge Seckach
SV Oberteuringen	0 – 10	VfR 09 Saarbrücken

== Second round ==
1. FC Neukölln Berlin	1 – 4	SV Wilhelmshaven
SV Neubrandenburg	0 – 5	Schmalfelder SV
SV Eiche Branitz	0 – 6	VfB Rheine
SSG Bergisch Gladbach	6 – 1	Hansa Rostock
Grün-Weiß Brauweiler	5 – 0	VfL Wittekind Wildeshausen
Concordia Goch	1 – 5	VfR Eintracht Wolfsburg
Fortuna Sachsenroß Hannover	0 – 6	TSV Siegen
SC Poppenbüttel	2 – 4	Tennis Borussia Berlin	(aet)
TSV Münchhausen	5 – 1	LTA Dresden
VfL Sindelfingen	1 – 0	Bayern Munich
VfL Ulm/Neu-Ulm	1 – 5	TuS Niederkirchen
VfR 09 Saarbrücken	5 – 0	Wacker München
FC Spöck	1 – 3	FSV Frankfurt
SC 07 Bad Neuenahr	2 – 2	TuS Wörrstadt	(aet, 1–3 on penalties)
Klinge Seckach	2 – 1	Wismut Aue
TuS Ahrbach	3 – 0	SV TuR Dresden

== Third round ==
VfL Sindelfingen	0 – 1	VfR Eintracht Wolfsburg	(aet)
Grün-Weiß Brauweiler	1 – 0	TuS Ahrbach
SV Wilhelmshaven	1 – 5	FSV Frankfurt
VfR 09 Saarbrücken	2 – 2	TuS Niederkirchen	(aet, 3–4 on penalties)
Tennis Borussia Berlin	0 – 0	Schmalfelder SV	(aet, 4–1 on penalties)
TSV Münchhausen	4 – 0	TuS Wörrstadt
Klinge Seckach	0 – 5	TSV Siegen
VfB Rheine	2 – 1	SSG Bergisch Gladbach	(aet)

== Quarter-finals ==
FSV Frankfurt	1 – 0	VfR Eintracht Wolfsburg
Tennis Borussia Berlin	0 – 3	Grün-Weiß Brauweiler
VfB Rheine	2 – 0	TSV Münchhausen
TSV Siegen	3 – 0	TuS Niederkirchen

== Semi-finals ==
FSV Frankfurt	1 – 1	Grün-Weiß Brauweiler	(aet, 5–4 on penalties)
VfB Rheine	0 – 3	TSV Siegen

== Final ==
23 June 1992

FSV Frankfurt	1 – 0	TSV Siegen
König 58'

Olympic Stadium (Berlin)
Attendance: 30,000
Referee: Gertrud Regus (Hallstadt)

FSV FRANKFURT:
GK	1	(Germany) Katja Kraus	Booked
DF		(Germany) Andrea Heinrich
DF		(Germany) Sonja Schlösser
DF		(Germany) Daniela Stumpf	Booked
MF		(Germany) Britta Unsleber
MF		(Germany) Bettina Mantel	Booked
MF		(Germany) Sandra Minnert
MF		(Germany) Gaby König
MF		(Germany) Dagmar Pohlmann		(substituted off) 66'
FW		(Germany) Martina Walter		(substituted off) 78'
FW		(Germany) Katja Bornschein
Substitutes:
MF		(Germany) Kerstin Pohlmann		(substituted on) 66'
FW		Weise		(substituted on) 78'
Manager:
(Germany) Monika Koch-Emsermann

TSV SIEGEN:
GK	1	(Germany) Marion Isbert
DF		(Germany) Birgit Wiese
DF		(Germany) Karin Sänger
DF		(Germany) Andrea Euteneuer	Booked
MF		(Netherlands) Marjan Veldhuizen
MF		(Germany) Martina Voss
MF		(Germany) Silvia Neid
MF		(Netherlands) Loes Camper
MF		(Germany) Heike Czyganowski		(substituted off) 60'
FW		(Germany) Monika Meyer		(substituted off) 55'
FW		(Germany) Gaby Mink	Booked
Substitutes:
DF		Schmidt		(substituted on) 60'
FW		(Germany) Jutta Nardenbach		(substituted on) 55'
Manager:
(Germany) Gerhard Neuser

== See also ==
- Bundesliga 1991–92
- 1991–92 DFB-Pokal men's competition
