= 1994–95 DFB-Pokal Frauen =

Tournament details
- Country: Germany
- Teams: 48

Final positions
- Champions: FSV Frankfurt
- Runners-up: TSV Siegen

Tournament statistics
- Matches played: 47

The Frauen DFB-Pokal 1994–95 was the 15th season of the cup competition, Germany's second-most important title in women's football. In the final which was held in Berlin on 24 June 1995, FSV Frankfurt defeated TSV Siegen 3–1, thus winning their fourth cup title. As Frankfurt had won the championship six weeks before they claimed the Double, too, the only one in the club's history.

== First round ==
Several clubs had byes in the first round. Those clubs were automatically qualified for the 2nd round of the cup.

SV Lorbeer Rothenburgsort	0 – 11	VfR Eintracht Wolfsburg
BVB Halle 93	1 – 7	Tennis Borussia Berlin
DSG Breitenthal-Oberhausen	2 – 7	TuS Ahrbach
SV Brackel	1 – 10	Grün-Weiß Brauweiler
FT Geestemünde	0 – 9	FC Rumeln-Kaldenhausen
Fortuna Dresden-Rähnitz	0 – 6	Klinge Seckach
TSV Battenberg	1 – 3	SG Praunheim
KBC Duisburg	0 – 5	Eintracht Rheine
SpVgg Wiehre	1 – 3	VfR 09 Saarbrücken
SKV Beienheim	0 – 7	FSV Frankfurt
Hertha Zehlendorf	1 – 4	Fortuna Sachsenroß Hannover
TSV Georgdorf	0 – 16	TSV Siegen
Wolfenbütteler SV	2 – 0	SSV Schmalfeld
TuS Ahrbach II	0 – 4	TuS Wörrstadt
SC 07 Bad Neuenahr	1 – 9	TuS Niederkirchen
TSV Crailsheim	3 – 1	FSV DJK Schwarzbach

== Second round ==
Fortuna Wuppertal	0 – 7	FC Rumeln-Kaldenhausen
FF USV Jena	1 – 3	Tennis Borussia Berlin
SC Marktbreit	0 – 3	Klinge Seckach
TSV Crailsheim	0 – 3	FSV Frankfurt
GSV Moers	0 – 12	TSV Siegen
BSV Müssen	1 – 4	Eintracht Rheine
STV Lövenich	0 – 7	Grün-Weiß Brauweiler
BWG Köln	3 – 2	SSG Bergisch Gladbach
Polizei SV Rostock	2 – 6	Fortuna Sachsenroß Hannover
Wolfenbütteler SV	0 – 2	VfR Eintracht Wolfsburg
SV Oberteuringen	0 – 8	TuS Ahrbach
Wittenseer SV	0 – 7	Turbine Potsdam
SG Kirchardt	1 – 0	TuS Wörrstadt
FSV Viktoria Jägersburg	0 – 4	VfL Sindelfingen
VfR 09 Saarbrücken	3 – 1	TuS Niederkirchen
FSV Unterkotzau	1 – 5	SG Praunheim

== Third round ==
Eintracht Rheine	1 – 3	Klinge Seckach
Turbine Potsdam	0 – 5	VfR 09 Saarbrücken
VfR Eintracht Wolfsburg	1 – 6	FC Rumeln-Kaldenhausen
TuS Ahrbach	2 – 3	Grün-Weiß Brauweiler
BWG Köln	1 – 3	VfL Sindelfingen
TSV Siegen	3 – 1	SG Praunheim
Fortuna Sachsenroß Hannover	3 – 1	Tennis Borussia Berlin
SG Kirchardt	0 – 8	FSV Frankfurt

== Quarter-finals ==
Fortuna Sachsenroß Hannover	2 – 3	Klinge Seckach	(aet)
Grün-Weiß Brauweiler	4 – 1	FC Rumeln-Kaldenhausen	(aet)
TSV Siegen	3 – 1	VfR 09 Saarbrücken
VfL Sindelfingen	0 – 2	FSV Frankfurt

== Semi-finals ==
TSV Siegen	1 – 1	Klinge Seckach	(4–2 on penalties)
FSV Frankfurt	1 – 1	Grün-Weiß Brauweiler	(5–4 on penalties)

== Final ==
24 June 1995

FSV Frankfurt	3 – 1	TSV Siegen
Prinz 32'; König 77'; Autermühl 89'		Fitzner 33'

Olympic Stadium (Berlin)
Attendance: 25,000
Referee: Silke Janssen (Emden)

FSV FRANKFURT 1899:
GK	1	(Germany) Katja Kraus
DF		(Germany) Anouschka Bernhard	(substituted off) 70'
DF		(Germany) Birgitt Austermühl
DF		(Germany) Sandra Minnert
MF		(Germany) Daniela Stumpf
MF		(Germany) Gaby König
MF		(Germany) Britta Unsleber
MF		(Germany) Katja Bornschein	(substituted off) 88'
MF		(Germany) Dagmar Pohlmann
FW		(Germany) Birgit Prinz
FW		(Germany) Sandra Smisek
Substitutes:
DF		(Germany) Kerstin Pohlmann	(substituted on) 70'
MF		(Germany) Sonja Schlösser	(substituted on) 88'

TSV SIEGEN:
GK	1	(Germany) Silke Rottenberg
DF	(Germany) Andrea Euteneuer
DF	(Germany) Britta Röwer
DF	(Germany) Conny Trauschke
MF	(Germany) Meike Fitzner
MF	(Germany) Heike Czyganowski
MF	(Germany) Silvia Neid
MF	(Denmark) Karina Sefron
MF	(Germany) Christina Chaladyniak
FW	(Germany) Monika Meyer
FW	(Germany) Gaby Mink	(substituted off) 73'
Substitutes:
FW	(Germany) Nadine Siwek	(substituted on) 73'

== See also ==
- Bundesliga 1994–95
- 1994–95 DFB-Pokal men's competition
