= 1995–96 Frauen-Bundesliga =

Bundesliga (women)
- Season: 1995–96
- Champions: TSV Siegen; 4th Bundesliga title 6th German title
- Relegated: SC 07 Bad Neuenahr; Rot-Weiß Hillen; Polizei SV Rostock; TuS Wörrstadt
- Top goalscorer: (Germany) Sandra Smisek (29)

The 1995–96 Frauen-Bundesliga was the sixth season of the Bundesliga (women), Germany's premier football league. It was the first season in which 3 points were awarded for a win. Previously the traditional 2 points were awarded for wins. In the final the runners-up of the divisions met. TSV Siegen from the north defeated SG Praunheim 1–0 to win their sixth championship.

== Northern conference ==
=== Final standings ===
Pos	Team	Pld	W	D	L	GF	GA	GD	Pts	Qualification or relegation
1	Grün-Weiß Brauweiler	18	15	1	2	80	17	+63	46	Participant of the semi-final
2	TSV Siegen	18	14	3	1	70	10	+60	45	Participant of the semi-final
3	FC Rumeln-Kaldenhausen	18	12	3	3	59	23	+36	39	
4	Eintracht Rheine	18	9	5	4	38	24	+14	32	
5	Fortuna Sachsenroß Hannover	18	7	2	9	31	50	−19	23	
6	Turbine Potsdam	18	5	6	7	29	41	−12	21	
7	Tennis Borussia Berlin	18	5	4	9	24	33	−9	19	
8	VfR Eintracht Wolfsburg	18	5	4	9	18	40	−22	19	
9	Polizei SV Rostock (Note: Promoted from the Regionalliga last season)	18	1	3	14	18	57	−39	6	Relegated to Regional-/Oberliga
10	Rot-Weiß Hillen	18	0	3	15	16	88	−72	3	Relegated to Regional-/Oberliga

=== Results ===
Home \ Away	GWB	SIE	RUK	HRH	FSH	POT	TBB	EWO	PSR	RWH
Grün-Weiß Brauweiler		2–1	3–0	4–1	8–1	8–0	4–2	3–0	7–0	11–0
TSV Siegen	4–3		6–1	0–0	10–0	5–0	3–0	6–1	6–0	9–0
FC Rumeln-Kaldenhausen	2–2	0–0		2–2	5–0	3–1	4–1	2–0	5–2	4–0
FC Eintracht Rheine	1–3	2–3	2–0		6–1	2–2	3–2	3–1	4–0	5–2
Fortuna Sachsenroß Hannover	1–3	0–5	0–1	3–0		1–1	1–1	6–0	2–1	5–1
SSV Turbine Potsdam	3–2	0–1	1–4	0–0	2–0		1–1	2–0	3–1	5–5
Tennis Borussia Berlin	0–1	0–2	3–5	0–0	1–3	2–1		0–1	3–2	3–1
VfR Eintracht Wolfsburg	0–2	0–0	0–5	0–3	2–1	5–1	1–1		2–2	2–1
Polizei SV Rostock	1–2	1–5	0–4	0–2	2–4	1–1	0–2	1–2		1–1
SG Rot-Weiß Hillen	0–12	0–4	0–12	1–2	1–2	0–5	0–2	1–1	2–3	

Legend: Blue = home team win; Yellow = draw; Red = away team win.

== Southern conference ==
=== Final standings ===
Pos	Team	Pld	W	D	L	GF	GA	GD	Pts	Qualification or relegation
1	FSV Frankfurt	18	16	1	1	99	6	+93	49	Participant of the semi-final
2	SG Praunheim	18	11	6	1	31	11	+20	39	Participant of the semi-final
3	TuS Niederkirchen	18	11	2	5	49	26	+23	35	
4	Klinge Seckach	18	10	4	4	28	17	+11	34	
5	TuS Ahrbach	18	6	5	7	22	31	−9	23	
6	VfL Sindelfingen	18	6	2	10	32	40	−8	20	
7	VfR 09 Saarbrücken	18	4	6	8	23	41	−18	18	
8	TSV Crailsheim (Note: Promoted from the Regionalliga last season)	18	2	8	8	7	27	−20	14	
9	TuS Wörrstadt	18	3	2	13	17	61	−44	11	Relegated to Regional-/Oberliga
10	SC 07 Bad Neuenahr	18	2	2	14	17	65	−48	8	Relegated to Regional-/Oberliga

=== Results ===
Home \ Away	FSV	SGP	NIE	KLS	AHR	SIN	SAR	CRA	WOE	BAN
FSV Frankfurt		0–2	5–1	5–0	6–1	11–0	5–0	4–0	9–0	8–0
SG Praunheim	0–0		1–0	1–1	2–2	2–0	4–0	1–1	2–1	5–0
TuS Niederkirchen	0–5	1–2		0–0	1–2	1–0	3–1	7–0	9–1	6–2
Klinge Seckach	0–5	1–0	1–2		0–2	4–0	1–1	0–0	2–1	5–0
TuS Ahrbach	0–6	0–1	1–1	0–4		1–3	2–0	0–1	0–1	1–1
VfL Sindelfingen	0–1	0–2	3–4	1–3	3–4		1–3	0–0	8–1	2–0
VfR 09 Saarbrücken	1–10	1–2	1–3	0–2	0–0	3–3		1–1	2–0	4–0
TSV Crailsheim	0–2	0–0	0–3	0–1	0–0	0–2	0–0		1–2	0–0
TuS Wörrstadt	1–9	2–2	0–2	0–2	1–3	0–3	1–1	0–2		4–1
SC 07 Bad Neuenahr	0–8	1–2	1–5	0–2	0–3	1–4	3–4	4–1	3–1	

Legend: Blue = home team win; Yellow = draw; Red = away team win.

== Semi-finals ==
Match		1st leg	2nd leg	Agg.
TSV Siegen	FSV Frankfurt	2–1	1–1	3 – 2
SG Praunheim	Grün-Weiß Brauweiler	1–0	0–0	1 – 0

== Final ==
SG Praunheim	TSV Siegen
2 June 1996; Frankfurt am Main; Spectators: 3,100; Referee: Kirsten Warns (Hamburg)
Marleen Wissink – Steffi Jones – Tina Wunderlich (Lesiak 78), Kubiak – Häusler (Eigenbrodt 47), Fülop, Pia Wunderlich, A. Walter, Werlein, Koch – M. Walter	Silke Rottenberg – Andrea Euteneuer – Conny Trauschke, Britta Röwe – Karina Sefron, Monika Meyer (Alfes 84), Louise Hansen (Frettloh 90), Silvia Neid, Michaela Kubat – Andrea Limper (Doris Fitschen 48), Christine Chaladyniak
	0–1 Kubat (29)

== Top scorers ==
Rank	Player	Team	Goals
1	(Germany) Sandra Smisek	FSV Frankfurt	29
2	(Germany) Carmen Holinka	Grün-Weiß Brauweiler	28
3	(Poland) Jolanta Nieczypor	FC Rumeln-Kaldenhausen	21

== Qualification ==
=== Qualification North ===
Paarung			1st Leg	2nd Leg	Agg
SSG 09 Bergisch Gladbach	–	Schmalfelder SV	0–2	0–6	0 – 8

=== Group North ===
Pos	Team	Pld	W	D	L	GF	GA	GD	Pts	Promotion
1	VfL Wittekind Wildeshausen	6	4	2	0	11	7	+4	14	Qualified for the Bundesliga 1996–97
2	Schmalfelder SV	6	2	1	3	6	7	−1	7	Qualified for the Bundesliga 1996–97
3	Wattenscheid 09	6	2	1	3	5	8	−3	7	
4	Hertha Zehlendorf	6	2	0	4	8	8	0	6	

=== Group South 1 ===
Pos	Team	Pld	W	D	L	GF	GA	GD	Pts	Promotion
1	FSV Schwarzbach(A)	4	3	1	0	16	2	+14	10	Qualified for the Bundesliga 1996–97
2	TSV Schwaben Augsburg	4	2	1	1	17	3	+14	7	
3	Blau-Weiß Gusenburg	4	0	0	4	0	28	−28	0	

SC Siegelbach renounced the right to participate in the qualification for the Bundesliga. Replacement Rot-Weiß Göcklingen received no license to participate, because they returned the necessary documents late.

=== Group South 2 ===
Pos	Team	Pld	W	D	L	GF	GA	GD	Pts	Promotion
1	SC Sand	4	2	2	0	11	9	+2	8	Qualified for the Bundesliga 1996–97
2	SG Kirchardt	4	2	0	2	8	8	0	6	
3	TSV Ludwigsburg	4	0	2	2	3	5	−2	2	

FC Oster Oberkirchen and SV Dirmingen renounced their right to participate in the qualification.

== Sources ==
- "West Germany (Women) 1995/96". Rec.Sport.Soccer Statistics Foundation. 15 January 2005. Retrieved 2009-07-22.
