= 1995–96 DFB-Pokal Frauen =

Tournament details
- Country: Germany
- Teams: 48

Final positions
- Champions: FSV Frankfurt
- Runners-up: Klinge Seckach

Tournament statistics
- Matches played: 47

The 1995–96 Frauen DFB-Pokal was the 16th season of the cup competition, Germany's second-most important title in women's football. In the final which was held in Berlin on 25 May 1996 FSV Frankfurt defeated Klinge Seckach 2–1, thus winning their fifth cup title and defending their title from the previous season.

== First round ==
Several clubs had byes in the first round. Those clubs were automatically qualified for the second round of the cup.

Blau-Weiß Fuhlenbrock	0 – 12	TSV Siegen
Wattenscheid 09	2 – 4	FC Rumeln-Kaldenhausen
Fortuna Dilkrath	1 – 18	Eintracht Rheine
SG Lütgendortmund	0 – 17	Grün-Weiß Brauweiler
Energie Cottbus	1 – 9	Turbine Potsdam
Hamburg	3 – 5	Polizei SV Rostock
Hertha Zehlendorf	2 – 4	Fortuna Sachsenroß Hannover
Fortuna Magdeburg/Wolmirstedt	1 – 5	Tennis Borussia Berlin
1. FC Nürnberg	3 – 2	TSV Crailsheim
FC Forstern	1 – 9	TuS Niederkirchen
SC Freiburg	1 – 4	Klinge Seckach
VfL Sindelfingen II	1 – 10	VfL Sindelfingen
TSV 1880 Gera-Zwötzen	1 – 12	SG Praunheim
FSV DJK Schwarzbach	0 – 5	FSV Frankfurt
TSV Eschollbrücken	1 – 3	SC 07 Bad Neuenahr
SC Soisdorf	0 – 3	TuS Ahrbach

== Second round ==
DFC Eggenstein	0 – 3	Klinge Seckach
TuS Niederkirchen II	1 – 13	TuS Niederkirchen
Erzgebirge Aue	1 – 11	FSV Frankfurt
Wacker München	0 – 5	TuS Ahrbach
VfL Sindelfingen	0 – 2	SG Praunheim
STV Lövenich	0 – 5	Eintracht Rheine
BSV Müssen	0 – 7	FC Rumeln-Kaldenhausen
FC Sankt Augustin	0 – 6	TSV Siegen
Grün-Weiß Brauweiler	8 – 0	SC 07 Bad Neuenahr
SC Wedemark	0 – 5	Tennis Borussia Berlin
VfL Wittekind Wildeshausen	3 – 1	Turbine Potsdam
Polizei SV Bremen	1 – 3	VfR Eintracht Wolfsburg
SG Thumby	0 – 5	Polizei SV Potsdam
SSV Schmalfeld	1 – 3	Fortuna Sachsenroß Hannover
FC Oster Oberkirchen	0 – 11	VfR 09 Saarbrücken
1. FC Nürnberg	1 – 3	TuS Wörrstadt

== Third round ==
FSV Frankfurt	4 – 0	TuS Ahrbach
Klinge Seckach	4 – 1	Tennis Borussia Berlin
TuS Niederkirchen	4 – 5	Fortuna Sachsenroß Hannover
SG Praunheim	0 – 1	FC Rumeln-Kaldenhausen
VfR 09 Saarbrücken	3 – 3	Polizei SV Rostock	(5–4 on penalties)
VfR Eintracht Wolfsburg	2 – 3	Eintracht Rheine
VfL Wittekind Wildeshausen	0 – 5	Grün-Weiß Brauweiler
TuS Wörrstadt	1 – 3	TSV Siegen

== Quarter-finals ==
Grün-Weiß Brauweiler	0 – 2	TSV Siegen
VfR 09 Saarbrücken	0 – 3	Klinge Seckach
Eintracht Rheine	0 – 4	FC Rumeln-Kaldenhausen	(aet)
Fortuna Sachsenroß Hannover	0 – 8	FSV Frankfurt

== Semi-finals ==
FSV Frankfurt	2 – 0	FC Rumeln-Kaldenhausen
Klinge Seckach	2 – 2	TSV Siegen	(4–3 on penalties)

== Final ==
25 May 1996

FSV Frankfurt	2 – 1	Klinge Seckach
Smisek 6'; Prinz 82'		Lingor 9'

Olympic Stadium (Berlin)
Attendance: 40,000
Referee: Birlin (Rheinfelden)

FSV FRANKFURT 1899:
GK	1	(Germany) Katja Kraus
DF		(Germany) Sandra Minnert
DF		(Germany) Birgitt Austermühl
DF		(Germany) Melanie Soyah
MF		(Germany) Daniela Stumpf
MF		(Germany) Gaby König
MF		(Germany) Britta Unsleber
MF		(Germany) Dagmar Pohlmann
FW		(Germany) Birgit Prinz
FW		(Germany) Sandra Smisek
FW		(Germany) Katja Bornschein

SC KLINGE SECKACH:
GK	1	(Germany) Susanne Becker
DF		(Germany) Nicola Weber
DF		(Germany) Alexandra Grein
DF		(Germany) Roswitha Weis
DF		(Germany) Martina Weber
MF		(Germany) Ulrike Ballweg	(substituted off) 85'
MF		(Germany) Renate Lingor
MF		(Germany) Christine Fütterer
MF		(Germany) Suheila Dikmen	(substituted off) 84'
FW		(Germany) Tanja Rastetter	(substituted off) 52'
FW		(Germany) Marita Kufel
Substitutes:
MF		(Germany) Bettina Böttinger	(substituted on) 85'
MF		(Germany) Dagmar Gramlich	(substituted on) 84'
FW		(Germany) Elke Sauter	(substituted on) 52'
