= 1980–81 DFB-Pokal Frauen =

Tournament details
- Country: Germany
- Teams: 16

Final positions
- Champions: SSG Bergisch Gladbach
- Runners-up: TuS Wörrstadt

Tournament statistics
- Matches played: 29
- Goals scored: 118 (4.07 per match)

The Frauen DFB-Pokal 1980–81 was the first season of the cup competition, Germany's second-most important title in women's football. In the final which was held in Stuttgart on 2 June 1981 SSG Bergisch Gladbach defeated TuS Wörrstadt 5–0. The 1980–81 cup was the only cup that was played with each match other than the final going over two legs.

== Participants ==
Northern region	Western region	Southwestern region	Southern region	Berlin
Bremen: VfB Komet Bremen; Hamburg: Wedeler TSV; Lower Saxony: VfR Eintracht Wolfsburg; Schleswig-Holstein: SG Thumby	Middle Rhine: SSG Bergisch Gladbach; Lower Rhine: KBC Duisburg; Westphalia: TSV Siegen	Rhineland: SC 07 Bad Neuenahr; Saarland: FC Hellas Marpingen; Southwest: TuS Wörrstadt	Baden SV Schlierstadt; Bavaria Inter Bergsteig Amberg; Hesse: TSV Hungen; South Baden: VfB Rheinfelden; Württemberg: FV Bellenberg	Berlin: BFC Meteor 06

== First round ==
VfB Komet Bremen	0 – 14; 0 – 7	BFC Meteor 06
KBC Duisburg	1 – 1; 2 – 1	VfR Eintracht Wolfsburg
SSG Bergisch Gladbach	3 – 1; 2 – 1	TSV Siegen
FV Bellenberg	4 – 2; 1 – 4	TSV Hungen
FC Hellas Marpingen	0 – 1; 0 – 2	SC 07 Bad Neuenahr
SV Schlierstadt	8 – 1; 6 – 0	VfR Rheinfelden
Inter Bergsteig Amberg	0 – 0; 1 – 4	TuS Wörrstadt
TSV Wedel	1 – 1; 1 – 0	SG Thumby

== Quarter-finals ==
BFC Meteor 06	5 – 1; 5 – 3	TSV Wedel
KBC Duisburg	0 – 0; 2 – 3	SSG Bergisch Gladbach
TSV Hungen	1 – 2; 1 – 1	SC 07 Bad Neuenahr
SV Schlierstadt	1 – 2; 2 – 3	TuS Wörrstadt

== Semi-finals ==
TuS Wörrstadt	1 – 0; 1 – 0	BFC Meteor 06
SSG Bergisch Gladbach	6 – 0; 3 – 0	SC 07 Bad Neuenahr

== Final ==
2 June 1981

SSG Bergisch Gladbach	5 – 0	TuS Wörrstadt
Kresimon 17' 34' 69'; Degwitz 38'; Trabant-Haarbach 52'

Neckarstadion (Stuttgart)
Attendance: 35,000
Referee: Winfried Walz (Waiblingen)

SSG 09 BERGISCH GLADBACH:
GK	1	(Germany) Hannelore Geilen
DF	(Germany) Brigitte Klinz
DF	(Germany) Gaby Dlugi
DF	(Germany) Bettina Krug
DF	(Germany) Erika Neuenfeldt	Substituted off
MF	(Germany) Lori Winkel
MF	(Germany) Monika Degwitz
MF	(Germany) Anne Trabant-Haarbach
FW	(Germany) Gitta Schmoll	Substituted off
FW	(Germany) Doris Kresimon
FW	(Germany) Ingrid Gebauer
Substitutes:
(Germany) Angelika Budny	Substituted in
(Germany) Andrea Haberla0	Substituted in
Manager:
(Germany) Anne Trabant-Haarbach

TUS 1847 WÖRRSTADT:
GK	1	Mirella Cina
DF		B. Petzhold
DF		Carla Rode
DF		S. Raudonat
DF		S. Zoll
MF		Heidi Ellmar
MF		Edith Solbach
MF		R. Fau
FW		Regine Israel
FW		Uschi Demler
FW		D. Bianco
Substitutes:
no substitutes used
Manager:
?

== See also ==
- 1980–81 DFB-Pokal men's competition
