= Marion Isbert =

German footballer

Personal information
- Full name: Marion Isbert (nee Feiden)
- Date of birth: 25 February 1964 (age 62)
- Place of birth: Germany
- Position: Goalkeeper

Senior career*
| Years | Team | Apps | (Gls) |
| 1980–1990 | TuS Ahrbach | | |
| 1990–1992 | TSV Siegen | | |

International career^{‡}
| 1982–1991 | Germany | 58 | (0) |
- * Club domestic league appearances and goals ‡ National team caps and goals as of 16 August 2008

Marion Isbert (born 25 February 1964 as Marion Feiden) is a former German international football player. The goalkeeper was capped 58 times for Germany. She won two German championships with TSV Siegen.

== Club career ==
Isbert's career started at TuS Ahrbach. In 1989, she reached the final of the German championship, but Ahrbach failed to qualify for the Bundesliga at its inception one year later. She then switched to TSV Siegen, winning the championship in 1991 and 1992. Siegen also came close to winning the cup in both seasons, losing out in finals to Grün-Weiß Brauweiler and FSV Frankfurt. After the season she lost her place in the starting eleven to Silke Rottenberg.

== International career ==
She was capped 58 times for Germany's national team. Her debut was on 10 November 1982 against Switzerland. In the semifinal of the 1989 EURO against Italy, she held three times in the penalties, before scoring the deciding goal herself. The team went on to win the championship and defended the title two years later. In 1991, she was also part of the team at the World Cup, where she was heralded as one of the tournaments top keepers. The third place game against Sweden was her last cap.
