= Kubat =

Kubat is a Turkish surname. It is also an anglicised and germanised form of the Czech surname Kubát. Notable people with the surname include:

- Çağla Kubat (born 1979), Turkish model and actress
- Eduard Kubat (1891–1976), German film producer
- Enes Kubat (born 1994), Turkish footballer
- Michaela Kubat (born 1969), German footballer
- Mike Kubat, Canadian television writer
- Kubat (singer), stage name of Ramazan Kubat (born 1974), Turkish singer

== See also ==
- Kubat Pasha Madrasa, a historic building in Turkey
