= 1994–95 Frauen-Bundesliga =

Frauen-Bundesliga
- Season: 1994–95
- Champions: FSV Frankfurt; 1st Bundesliga title 2nd German title
- Relegated: Tennis Borussia Berlin; Wacker München; Wattenscheid 09; TuS Wörrstadt
- Top goalscorer: (Germany) Heidi Mohr (27)

The 1994–95 Frauen-Bundesliga was the fifth season of the Frauen-Bundesliga, Germany's premier football league. It was the last season, in which 2 points were awarded for a win. Beginning with the following season the standard 3 points were awarded for wins. In the final the champion of the southern division, FSV Frankfurt, won 2–0 against the champion of the northern division, Grün-Weiß Brauweiler. Frankfurt thus won their second championship. By winning the cup final six weeks later they completed the Double.

== Northern conference ==
=== Standings ===
Pos	Team	Pld	W	D	L	GF	GA	GD	Pts	Qualification or relegation
1	Grün-Weiß Brauweiler	18	17	0	1	77	9	+68	34	Participant of the Semifinal
2	FC Rumeln-Kaldenhausen	18	13	3	2	60	18	+42	29	Participant of the Semifinal
3	TSV Siegen (Note: 1993–94 Bundesliga (women) champion)	18	11	4	3	64	23	+41	26	
4	Eintracht Rheine	18	7	6	5	31	24	+7	20	
5	Fortuna Sachsenroß Hannover	18	9	1	8	41	41	0	19	
6	SSV Turbine Potsdam (Note: Promoted from the Regionalliga last season)	18	6	2	10	25	60	−35	14	
7	VfR Eintracht Wolfsburg	18	4	5	9	26	40	−14	13	
8	Tennis Borussia Berlin	18	2	7	9	16	36	−20	11	
9	Wattenscheid 09	18	3	2	13	19	70	−51	8	Relegated to Regional-/Oberliga
10	Schmalfelder SV	18	1	4	13	6	44	−38	6	Relegated to Regional-/Oberliga

Source: RSSSF

=== Results ===
Home \ Away	GWB	RUK	SIE	HRH	FSH	POT	EWO	TBB	W09	SCH
Grün-Weiß Brauweiler		2–1	4–0	3–0	8–0	5–0	2–0	2–0	5–1	1–0
FC Rumeln-Kaldenhausen	2–1		4–3	4–1	3–1	4–0	7–2	2–1	3–0	2–0
TSV Siegen	2–3	3–3		2–2	6–1	6–0	3–0	7–1	4–0	7–0
FC Eintracht Rheine	0–3	1–3	2–2		3–0	3–1	1–1	2–0	1–0	2–1
Fortuna Sachsenroß Hannover	1–3	0–1	3–4	2–0		2–1	3–2	1–2	5–1	4–0
SSV Turbine Potsdam	0–11	0–11	0–2	0–3	2–2		5–3	2–1	3–2	3–1
VfR Eintracht Wolfsburg	1–3	0–0	0–2	0–0	3–4	3–1		0–0	1–4	1–1
Tennis Borussia Berlin	1–5	1–1	0–0	1–1	0–4	1–1	3–4		2–2	0–0
Wattenscheid 09	0–10	0–8	0–7	0–8	2–5	0–5	1–2	2–1		0–0
Schmalfelder SV	0–6	2–1	0–4	1–1	0–3	0–1	0–3	0–1	0–4	

Legend: Blue = home team win; Yellow = draw; Red = away team win.

== Southern conference ==
=== Standings ===
Pos	Team	Pld	W	D	L	GF	GA	GD	Pts	Qualification or relegation
1	FSV Frankfurt	18	18	0	0	92	4	+88	36	Participant of the Semifinal
2	TuS Ahrbach	18	13	1	4	69	21	+48	27	Participant of the Semifinal
3	SG Praunheim	18	9	4	5	38	28	+10	22	
4	SC Klinge Seckach	18	9	4	5	29	28	+1	22	
5	VfL Sindelfingen	18	6	5	7	20	32	−12	17	
6	TuS Niederkirchen	18	7	2	9	33	34	−1	16	
7	VfR 09 Saarbrücken	18	5	5	8	29	53	−24	15	
8	TuS Wörrstadt	18	3	6	9	10	38	−28	12	
9	Wacker München (Note: Promoted from the Regionalliga last season)	18	1	7	10	17	45	−28	9	Relegated to Regional-/Oberliga
10	FSV Schwarzbach	18	1	2	15	16	70	−54	4	Relegated to Regional-/Oberliga

Source: RSSSF

=== Results ===
Home \ Away	FSV	AHR	SGP	KLS	SIN	NIE	SAR	WÖR	WMU	SBA
FSV Frankfurt		4–0	3–0	7–1	4–0	1–0	11–0	11–0	12–0	7–0
TuS Ahrbach	1–3		5–0	3–1	2–0	4–0	7–3	4–0	3–0	9–1
SG Praunheim	0–4	2–1		1–2	0–0	3–2	1–1	5–1	0–0	5–0
SC Klinge Seckach	1–2	0–0	1–6		2–0	4–1	1–2	1–1	2–2	3–0
VfL Sindelfingen	0–6	1–6	1–4	0–1		3–2	1–1	3–0	1–0	4–1
TuS Niederkirchen	1–2	1–4	1–2	3–3	0–1		4–0	2–1	2–0	4–1
VfR 09 Saarbrücken	0–3	1–5	3–2	0–2	3–3	2–4		2–1	2–1	3–4
TuS Wörrstadt	0–4	1–0	1–1	0–2	0–0	0–2	1–1		0–0	2–0
Wacker München	0–4	1–9	0–2	0–1	0–0	2–2	1–1	0–1		1–1
FSV Schwarzbach	0–4	2–6	2–4	0–1	0–2	1–2	1–4	0–0	2–9	

Legend: Blue = home team win; Yellow = draw; Red = away team win.

== Semifinals ==
Match		1st leg	2nd leg	Agg.
Grün-Weiß Brauweiler	TuS Ahrbach	3–2	6–1	9–3
FC Rumeln-Kaldenhausen	FSV Frankfurt	2–2	1–5	3–7

== Final ==
Grün-Weiß Brauweiler	FSV Frankfurt
14 May 1995; Pulheim; Spectators: 1,500; Referee: Gebhardt (Hallstadt)
Manuela Goller – Andrea Klein, Claudia Klein, Natascha Schwind, Hanushek (Sonja Fuss 25) – Tünde Nagy, Anja Koser, Bettina Wiegmann, Gudrun Gottschlich – Lieth, Patricia Menge (Gyöngyi Lovász-Anton 46)	Katja Kraus – Anouschka Bernhard – Milke, Birgitt Austermühl, Daniela Stumpf – Dagmar Pohlmann, Sandra Minnert, Gaby König (Schlösser 87), Katja Bornschein (Kerstin Pohlmann 82) – Sandra Smisek, Birgit Prinz
	0–1 Bornschein (3); 0–2 Prinz (16)

== Top scorers ==
Rank	Player	Team	Goals
1	(Germany) Heidi Mohr	TuS Ahrbach	27
2	(Germany) Maren Meinert	FC Rumeln-Kaldenhausen	21
3	(Germany) Melanie Lasrich	TuS Ahrbach	20

== Qualification ==
=== Group North ===
Pos	Team	Pld	W	D	L	GF	GA	GD	Pts	Qualification
1	Polizei SV Rostock	6	5	0	1	24	6	+18	10	Qualified for the Bundesliga 1995–96
2	Rot-Weiß Hillen	6	3	1	2	8	16	−8	7	Qualified for the Bundesliga 1995–96
3	TV Jahn Delmenhorst	6	2	0	4	7	13	−6	4	
4	SpVgg Oberaußem-Fortuna	6	1	1	4	5	9	−4	3	

=== Group South 1 ===
Pos	Team	Pld	W	D	L	GF	GA	GD	Pts	Qualification
1	SC 07 Bad Neuenahr	6	4	1	1	20	7	+13	9	Qualified for the Bundesliga 1995–96
2	SC Freiburg	6	4	0	2	7	9	−2	8	
3	DFC Allendorf/Eder	6	2	0	4	5	12	−7	4	
4	DFC Eggenstein	6	1	1	4	11	15	−4	3	

=== Group South 2 ===
Pos	Team	Pld	W	D	L	GF	GA	GD	Pts	Qualification
1	TSV Crailsheim	6	5	1	0	22	7	+15	11	Qualified for the Bundesliga 1995–96
2	SC Siegelbach	6	3	1	2	12	10	+2	7	
3	SpVgg Landshut	6	3	0	3	15	11	+4	6	
4	FC Oster Oberkirchen	6	0	0	6	2	23	−21	0	
