= Ulrike Ballweg =

German footballer (born 1965)

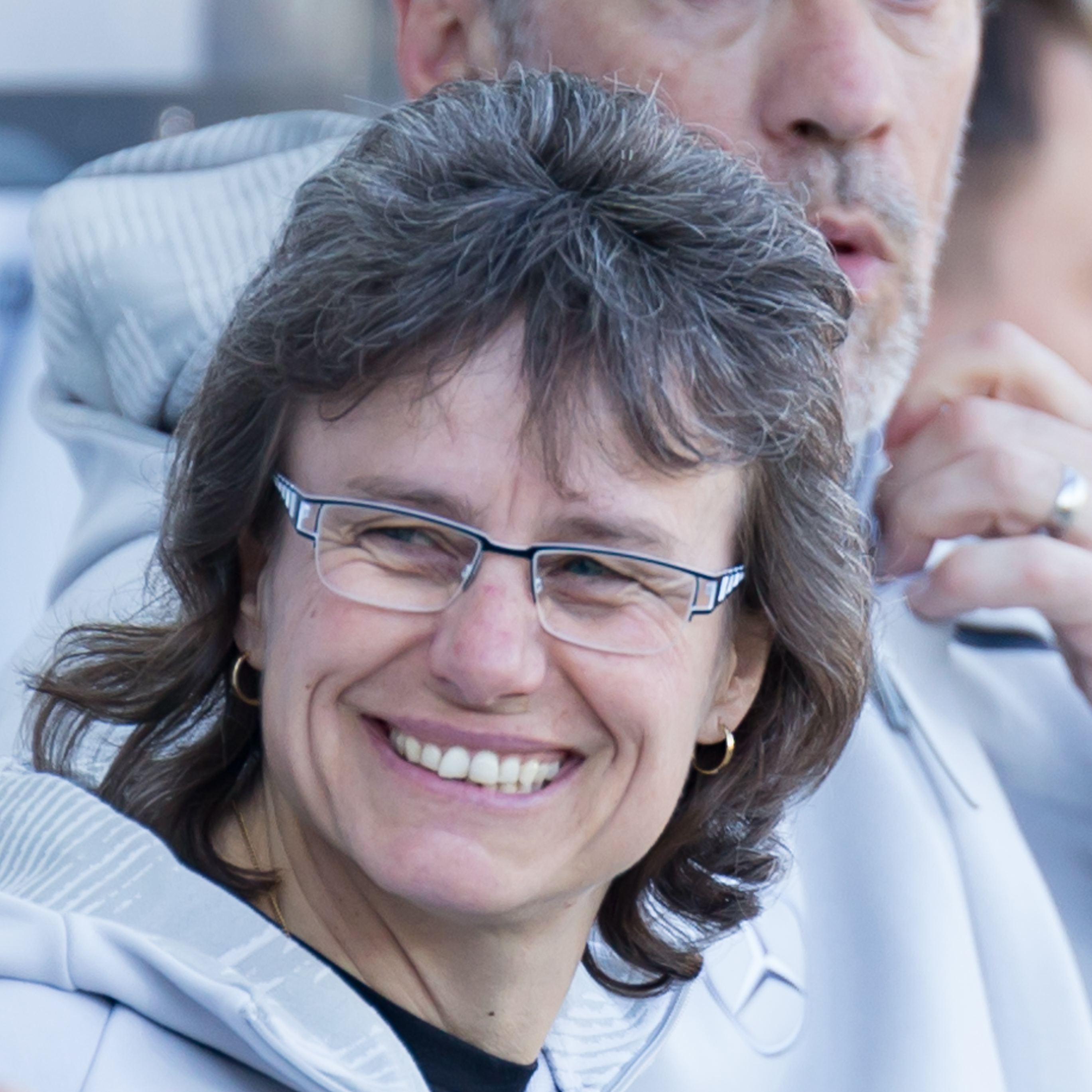
- Ulrike Ballweg in 2018

Personal information
- Date of birth: 17 September 1965 (age 61)
- Place of birth: Hainstadt, Germany
- Position: Defender

Senior career*
Years	Team	Apps	(Gls)
1989-1997	SC Klinge Seckach		
- * Club domestic league appearances and goals

Ulrike Ballweg (born 17 September 1965) is a German football coach and former player who coached at SC Klinge Seckach.

== Playing career ==
Ballweg's greatest achievement as a football player was reaching the 1996 DFB final as a player with SC Klinge Seckach.

== Coaching career ==
In 2002, Ballweg hired her former teammate Silvia Neid as part of the coaching staff of the Germany women's national under-17 football team, which would lead to the team becoming finalists in the European Championship in 2004 and then winning the 2004 FIFA U-19 Women's World Championship. A year later, Silvia Neid became national coach of the senior women's national team and Ballweg became her assistant. As assistant coach, Ballweg won the World Cup in 2007 and the European Championship twice with the senior national team. In 2016, Ballweg took over as head of the DFB's talent and elite development.
