= 1991–92 Frauen-Bundesliga =

Frauen-Bundesliga
- Season: 1991–92

The 1991–92 Frauen-Bundesliga was the second season of the Frauen-Bundesliga, Germany's premier football league. In this season clubs from former East Germany were allowed to compete for the first time in an all-German Bundesliga due to the integration of the East German Football Association into the German Football Association. Both divisions were thus expanded to eleven competitors to make room for one East German team each. USV Jena in the north and Wismut Aue in the south both suffered relegation after the season, though.

== Northern conference ==
=== Standings ===
| Pos | Team | Pld | W | D | L | GF | GA | GD | Pts | Qualification or relegation |
|---|---|---|---|---|---|---|---|---|---|---|
| 1 | TSV Siegen (Note: 1990–91 Bundesliga (women) champion) | 20 | 18 | 2 | 0 | 49 | 6 | +43 | 38 | Participant of the Semifinal |
| 2 | Grün-Weiß Brauweiler(N) | 20 | 13 | 4 | 3 | 51 | 13 | +38 | 30 | Participant of the Semifinal |
| 3 | VfB Rheine | 20 | 12 | 4 | 4 | 42 | 17 | +25 | 28 | |
| 4 | SSG 09 Bergisch Gladbach | 20 | 9 | 5 | 6 | 27 | 22 | +5 | 23 | |
| 5 | VfR Eintracht Wolfsburg | 20 | 9 | 4 | 7 | 36 | 28 | +8 | 22 | |
| 6 | KBC Duisburg | 20 | 8 | 6 | 6 | 31 | 24 | +7 | 22 | |
| 7 | Tennis Borussia Berlin (Note: Promoted from the Regionalliga last season) | 20 | 7 | 2 | 11 | 27 | 30 | −3 | 16 | |
| 8 | Fortuna Sachsenroß Hannover | 20 | 6 | 4 | 10 | 22 | 39 | −17 | 16 | |
| 9 | Schmalfelder SV | 20 | 5 | 4 | 11 | 15 | 22 | −7 | 14 | Relegated to Regional-/Oberliga |
| 10 | SC Poppenbüttel | 20 | 2 | 2 | 16 | 13 | 55 | −42 | 6 | Relegated to Regional-/Oberliga |
| 11 | USV Jena | 20 | 2 | 1 | 17 | 14 | 71 | −57 | 5 | Relegated to Regional-/Oberliga |

=== Results ===
| Home \ Away | SIE | GWB | RHE | BGL | EWO | KBC | TBB | FSH | SFE | POP | JEN |
|---|---|---|---|---|---|---|---|---|---|---|---|
| TSV Siegen | | 2–1 | 4–0 | 1–0 | 2–1 | 4–0 | 2–0 | 2–0 | 1–0 | 1–0 | 6–0 |
| Grün-Weiß Brauweiler | 1–1 | | 2–1 | 2–1 | 2–0 | 3–0 | 1–1 | 7–0 | 5–0 | 7–0 | 5–0 |
| VfB Rheine | 0–2 | 2–0 | | 0–1 | 4–2 | 2–2 | 3–1 | 2–1 | 0–0 | 5–0 | 8–0 |
| SSG 09 Bergisch Gladbach | 2–2 | 1–1 | 0–2 | | 0–3 | 3–0 | 2–1 | 2–0 | 1–0 | 1–1 | 2–2 |
| VfR Eintracht Wolfsburg | 1–2 | 2–1 | 0–1 | 1–1 | | 0–0 | 1–2 | 1–1 | 2–1 | 5–2 | 3–1 |
| KBC Duisburg | 0–2 | 0–0 | 0–0 | 4–2 | 1–1 | | 0–2 | 7–0 | 1–1 | 0–1 | 3–0 |
| Tennis Borussia Berlin | 0–2 | 0–2 | 0–1 | 1–2 | 2–0 | 1–3 | | 2–3 | 0–0 | 3–2 | 3–0 |
| Fortuna Sachsenroß Hannover | 0–3 | 0–3 | 0–0 | 1–0 | 0–1 | 1–2 | 1–5 | | 1–0 | 3–0 | 5–1 |
| Schmalfelder SV | 0–1 | 0–1 | 0–4 | 0–1 | 1–2 | 1–2 | 2–0 | 0–0 | | 3–0 | 2–0 |
| SC Poppenbüttel | 0–5 | 0–2 | 1–3 | 0–2 | 2–4 | 0–3 | 1–2 | 1–1 | 0–2 | | 2–1 |
| USV Jena | 0–4 | 2–5 | 1–4 | 0–3 | 2–6 | 0–3 | 2–1 | 0–4 | 0–2 | 2–0 | |

Legend: Blue = home team win; Yellow = draw; Red = away team win.

== Southern conference ==
=== Standings ===
| Pos | Team | Pld | W | D | L | GF | GA | GD | Pts | Qualification or relegation |
|---|---|---|---|---|---|---|---|---|---|---|
| 1 | FSV Frankfurt | 20 | 16 | 2 | 2 | 44 | 16 | +28 | 34 | Participant of the Semifinal |
| 2 | TuS Niederkirchen | 20 | 14 | 3 | 3 | 40 | 15 | +25 | 31 | Participant of the Semifinal |
| 3 | VfR 09 Saarbrücken | 20 | 13 | 1 | 6 | 40 | 23 | +17 | 27 | |
| 4 | VfL Sindelfingen | 20 | 10 | 6 | 4 | 33 | 19 | +14 | 26 | |
| 5 | SC Klinge Seckach | 20 | 9 | 6 | 5 | 32 | 26 | +6 | 24 | |
| 6 | SG Praunheim | 20 | 6 | 6 | 8 | 16 | 20 | −4 | 18 | |
| 7 | TuS Ahrbach(N) | 20 | 5 | 6 | 9 | 21 | 24 | −3 | 16 | |
| 8 | VfL Ulm/Neu-Ulm | 20 | 6 | 2 | 12 | 25 | 48 | −23 | 14 | Relegated to Regional-/Oberliga |
| 9 | Wismut Aue (Note: Promoted from the Regionalliga previous season) | 20 | 3 | 5 | 12 | 20 | 38 | −18 | 11 | Relegated to Regional-/Oberliga |
| 10 | TSV Ludwigsburg | 20 | 4 | 2 | 14 | 17 | 41 | −24 | 10 | |
| 11 | FC Bayern Munich | 20 | 2 | 5 | 13 | 14 | 32 | −18 | 9 | Relegated to Regional-/Oberliga |

=== Results ===
| Home \ Away | FSV | NIE | SAR | SIN | KLS | SGP | AHR | UNU | EGA | LUD | FCB |
|---|---|---|---|---|---|---|---|---|---|---|---|
| FSV Frankfurt | | 1–4 | 4–2 | 1–2 | 1–0 | 2–0 | 3–0 | 6–0 | 4–1 | 1–0 | 2–0 |
| TuS Niederkirchen | 0–1 | | 0–2 | 0–0 | 2–0 | 2–0 | 1–0 | 5–1 | 2–0 | 3–1 | 4–0 |
| VfR 09 Saarbrücken | 0–1 | 2–1 | | 0–1 | 1–2 | 1–0 | 2–0 | 3–2 | 4–1 | 4–1 | 1–0 |
| VfL Sindelfingen | 2–3 | 1–3 | 4–1 | | 0–1 | 1–1 | 1–0 | 4–0 | 2–0 | 3–0 | 2–0 |
| SC Klinge Seckach | 1–1 | 1–1 | 1–2 | 1–1 | | 1–1 | 1–0 | 3–1 | 1–0 | 4–0 | 3–3 |
| SG Praunheim | 1–3 | 1–2 | 0–0 | 2–2 | 2–0 | | 1–1 | 0–1 | 0–0 | 2–1 | 1–0 |
| TuS Ahrbach | 2–2 | 1–2 | 3–1 | 1–0 | 3–3 | 2–0 | | 4–1 | 1–1 | 2–1 | 1–1 |
| VfL Ulm/Neu-Ulm | 0–3 | 1–4 | 2–4 | 1–2 | 3–1 | 0–1 | 1–0 | | 1–1 | 4–1 | 0–0 |
| Wismut Aue | 0–2 | 1–2 | 1–4 | 2–2 | 1–2 | 0–2 | 1–0 | 3–1 | | 2–0 | 2–2 |
| TSV Ludwigsburg | 0–1 | 1–1 | 0–4 | 1–1 | 2–3 | 0–1 | 1–0 | 2–3 | 3–2 | | 2–0 |
| FC Bayern Munich | 1–2 | 0–1 | 0–2 | 1–2 | 1–3 | 1–0 | 0–0 | 1–2 | 3–1 | 0–1 | |

Legend: Blue = home team win; Yellow = draw; Red = away team win.

== Semifinals ==
| Match | | 1st leg | 2nd leg | Agg. |
|---|---|---|---|---|
| TSV Siegen | TuS Niederkirchen | 2–0 | 2–1 | 4–1 |
| Grün-Weiß Brauweiler | FSV Frankfurt | 3–1 | 0–1 | 3–2 |

== Final ==
| TSV Siegen | Grün-Weiß Brauweiler |
28 June 1992; Siegen; Spectators: 2,649; Referee: Christel Znudek (Leimen)
| Marion Isbert – Jutta Nardenbach – Sänger, Loes Camper – Marjan Veldhuizen, Martina Voss, Silvia Neid, Birgit Wiese, Heike Czyganowski (Schmidt 69) – Meyer, Mink | Silke Rottenberg – Claudia Klein – Natascha Schwind, Andrea Klein – Richter, Perner, Walek (Reimann 58), Bettina Wiegmann, Tünde Nagy – Wolff, Michaela Kubat |
| 1–0 Neid (27); 2–0 Meyer (57) | |

== Top scorers ==
| | Player | Team | Goals |
|---|---|---|---|
| 1 | (Germany) Heidi Mohr | TuS Niederkirchen | 28 |

== Qualification ==
=== Group North ===
| Pos | Team | Pld | W | D | L | GF | GA | GD | Pts | Qualification |
|---|---|---|---|---|---|---|---|---|---|---|
| 1 | STV Lövenich | 6 | 4 | 1 | 1 | 16 | 10 | +6 | 9 | Qualified for the Bundesliga 1992–93 |
| 2 | TV Jahn Delmenhorst | 6 | 3 | 1 | 2 | 15 | 8 | +7 | 7 | Qualified for the Bundesliga 1992–93 |
| 3 | FC Rumeln-Kaldenhausen | 6 | 3 | 1 | 2 | 13 | 12 | +1 | 7 | |
| 4 | SSV Turbine Potsdam | 6 | 0 | 1 | 5 | 4 | 18 | −14 | 1 | |

=== Group South 1 ===
| Pos | Team | Pld | W | D | L | GF | GA | GD | Pts | Qualification |
|---|---|---|---|---|---|---|---|---|---|---|
| 1 | FFC Wacker München | 6 | 6 | 0 | 0 | 19 | 4 | +15 | 12 | Qualified for the Bundesliga 1992–93 |
| 2 | TSV Crailsheim | 6 | 3 | 1 | 2 | 10 | 6 | +4 | 7 | |
| 3 | FSV Viktoria Jägersburg | 6 | 0 | 3 | 3 | 9 | 17 | −8 | 3 | |
| 4 | SC 07 Bad Neuenahr | 6 | 0 | 2 | 4 | 6 | 17 | −11 | 2 | |

=== Group South 2 ===
| Pos | Team | Pld | W | D | L | GF | GA | GD | Pts | Qualification |
|---|---|---|---|---|---|---|---|---|---|---|
| 1 | TSV Battenberg | 6 | 6 | 0 | 0 | 20 | 3 | +17 | 12 | Qualified for the Bundesliga 1992–93 |
| 2 | DFC Spöck | 6 | 3 | 1 | 2 | 18 | 10 | +8 | 7 | |
| 3 | SC Siegelbach | 6 | 2 | 1 | 3 | 13 | 14 | −1 | 5 | |
| 4 | SC Sand | 6 | 0 | 0 | 6 | 7 | 31 | −24 | 0 | |
