= TuS Wörrstadt =

- Full name: TuS 1847 Wörrstadt
- Founded: 1847
- Chairman: Klaur Römer
- Coach: Rainer Wißmann
- League: Regionalliga Südwest
- 2015–16: 8th

TuS Wörrstadt is a German women's football multi-sports club based in Wörrstadt, Rhineland-Palatinate. The club was founded in 1847 and is most famous for its women's football department which won the first national championship in 1974. Recently the team has been relegated to the 2nd Bundesliga. The club has other departments for badminton, gymnastics, team handball, and track and field. They also have a department which is involved in activities revolving around the carnival.

== History ==
The women's football section of TuS Wörrstadt was founded in 1969 by Egon Rehbein. In the first few years of their existence they were one of the most prominent teams in German women's football, winning nearly every game they attended. When in 1973 the German Football Association rejected to hold a first German football championship TuS Wörrstadt's Fips Scheid organized the "Goldpokal", an unofficial national women's football championship. Wörrstadt won the tournament defeating Bad Neuenahr in the semi-final and Bayern Munich in the final. At the banquet after the final officials of the German football association announced that an official German women's football championship would be held in 1974.

The tournament was indeed held in the following year and TuS Wörrstadt became the first official German women's football champion, defeating DJK Eintracht Gelsenkirchen-Erle 4–0 in the final. In 1975 Wörrstadt reached the semi-final of the national championship again, but lost to Bonner SC. TuS won some regional honours in following years, but success in the national championship was elusive. When they qualified in 1978 and 1979 they lost in the first round to TSV Siegen and FSV Harburg. In 1981 they lost only in the semi-final of the German championship. Also in 1981 they reached final of the first national women's cup, losing to SSG Bergisch Gladbach, then the dominant team in women's football. The next time that TuS Wörrstadt qualified for a national tournament was in 1985–86 where they lost in the first round of the German championship. They had another showing in the quarter-final in 1988.

When in 2000 the Bundesliga was incepted TuS did not manage to qualify. While the champion of the southwest would have been eligible they were tied for first place with TuS Niederkirchen and lost the decider 0–1 to Niederkirchen. More qualifications for the Bundesliga were handed out in a promotion round, but again Wörrstadt was not able to overcome the opposition consisting of SG Praunheim, TuS Ahrbach, and SV Jägersburg. As a result, several of the club's core players left Wörrstadt to play for clubs that had qualified for the Bundesliga.

After the team had recovered they managed promotion to the Bundesliga in 1993. The club avoided relegation just scarcely in the following two season and were eventually relegated to the newly founded Oberliga Südwest. Wörrstadt's performances declined in the Oberliga, excluding a rebound in 1999–2000. Eventually they were relegated to third-tier football in 2002, but managed immediate promotion back to the Regionalliga in 2003. Midtable results followed. Although the club was not relegated again they were back to third-tier football in 2004 due to the inception of the 2nd Bundesliga. After six seasons in the Regionalliga Wörrstadt was promoted to the 2nd Bundesliga after the 2008–09 season.

== Honours ==
- German football champions (1): 1974
- Goldpokal winners: 1973
- SWFV association champions (10): 1972, 1973, 1974, 1975, 1978, 1979, 1981, 1987, 1988, 1993
- SWFV association cup winners (7): 1980, 1981, 1987, 1988, 1989, 1990, 1991
- DFB-Pokal runners-up (1): 1981
- Regionalliga Südwest champions (1): 2009
- Verbandsliga Südwest champions (1): 2003
- Menton Tournament (1): 1976

== Statistics ==
Season	League	Place	W	D	L	GF	GA	Pts	DFB-Pokal
1993–94	Bundesliga Süd (I)	8	3	2	13	15	61	8	nq
1994–95	Bundesliga Süd	8	3	6	9	10	38	12	2nd round
1995–96	Bundesliga Süd	9	3	2	13	17	61	14	3rd round
1996–97	Oberliga Südwest (II)	2	11	1	4	36	21	24	2nd round
1997–98	Oberliga Südwest	6	8	3	9	25	37	27	nq
1998–99	Oberliga Südwest	10	7	6	9	31	42	27	nq
1999–00	Oberliga Südwest	4	13	1	10	43	31	40	nq
2000–01	Oberliga Südwest	7	8	4	10	28	27	28	nq
2001–02	Regionalliga Südwest (II)	11	2	5	15	24	71	11	nq
2002–03	Verbandsliga Südwest (III)	1	unknown						nq
2003–04	Regionalliga Südwest	7	8	3	11	44	64	27	nq
2004–05	Regionalliga Südwest (III)	5	8	2	10	34	57	26	nq
2005–06	Regionalliga Südwest	7	8	2	12	47	49	26	nq
2006–07	Regionalliga Südwest	6	8	3	9	43	46	27	nq
2007–08	Regionalliga Südwest	5	11	5	6	46	35	38	nq
2008–09	Regionalliga Südwest	1	18	3	1	89	25	57	nq
2009–10	2nd Bundesliga	12	2	6	14	21	58	12	2nd round
2010–11	Regionalliga Südwest	6	10	5	7	47	42	35	1st round
2011–12	Regionalliga Südwest	6	9	4	7	41	36	31	nq
2012–13	Regionalliga Südwest	1	15	0	3	47	22	45	nq
2013–14	2nd Bundesliga	12	0	2	20	5	97	2	1st round
2014–15	Regionalliga Südwest	—	0	0	0	0	0	0	Qualified
Green marks a season followed by promotion, red a season followed by relegation.
