= List of German women's football champions =

German women's football champions

Frauen-Bundesliga (since 1990)
- Country
- Germany
- Founded
- 1974
- Number of teams
- 20 (seasons 1990–91 to 1996–97); 12 (seasons 1997–98 to 2024–25); 14 (since 2025–26)
- Current champions
- Bayern Munich (2024–25)
- Most successful club
- SSG Bergisch Gladbach (9 championships)

This is a list of all German women's football champions. TuS Wörrstadt won the first championship, held in 1974. SSG Bergisch Gladbach is the club with the most championships, winning the trophy nine times. The women's football department of the club has since moved to Bayer Leverkusen.

== West German champions (1973–1997) ==
The German women's football championship was first held in 1973–74. Until 1989–90 the German championship was held as a single-elimination tournament. A nationwide league, the Bundesliga was incepted in 1990–91. As the league consisted of two divisions playoffs were still held at the end of the season. In 1991–92 one club from former East Germany was admitted to each division of the Bundesliga, both were relegated at the end of the season, though.

Key

#	Match played over two legs
*	Match went to extra time
†	Champion also won DFB-Pokal

Year	Champions	Score	Runners-up	Venue	Attendance
1974	TuS Wörrstadt	4–0	DJK Eintracht Erle	Mainz	3,500
1975	Bonner SC	4–2	Bayern Munich	Bad Godesberg	2,400
1976	Bayern Munich	4–2 *	Tennis Borussia Berlin	Siegen	
1977	SSG Bergisch Gladbach	0–0 # 1–0	FC Oberst Schiel 1902 Niederrad	Bergisch Gladbach; Niederrad	8,000; 3,000
1978	SC 07 Bad Neuenahr	2–0 # 0–1	FC Hellas Marpingen	Bad Neuenahr; Eppelborn	1,500; 4,000
1979	SSG Bergisch Gladbach	2–3 # 1–0	Bayern Munich	Munich; Bergisch Gladbach	800; 12,000
1980	SSG Bergisch Gladbach	5–0	KBC Duisburg	Bergisch Gladbach	5,000
1981	SSG Bergisch Gladbach †	4–0	Tennis Borussia Berlin	Bergisch Gladbach	4,000
1982	SSG Bergisch Gladbach †	6–0	Bayern Munich	Bergisch Gladbach	3,500
1983	SSG Bergisch Gladbach	6–0	Tennis Borussia Berlin	Bergisch Gladbach	3,200
1984	SSG Bergisch Gladbach †	3–1	FSV Frankfurt	Frankfurt	2,200
1985	KBC Duisburg	1–0	Bayern Munich	Duisburg	5,500
1986	FSV Frankfurt	5–0	SSG Bergisch Gladbach	Bergisch Gladbach	
1987	TSV Siegen †	2–1	FSV Frankfurt	Siegen	6,400
1988	SSG Bergisch Gladbach	0–0 * (5–4 pen.)	KBC Duisburg	Bergisch Gladbach	3,800
1989	SSG Bergisch Gladbach	2–0	TuS Ahrbach	Montabaur	6,000
1990	TSV Siegen	3–0	SSG Bergisch Gladbach	Siegen	3,700
Two divisional Bundesliga play-off finals:
1991	TSV Siegen	4–2	FSV Frankfurt	Siegen	4,500
1992	TSV Siegen	2–0	Grün-Weiß Brauweiler	Siegen	
1993	TuS Niederkirchen	2–1 *	TSV Siegen	Limburgerhof	5,000
1994	TSV Siegen	1–0	Grün-Weiß Brauweiler	Pulheim	2,600
1995	FSV Frankfurt †	2–0	Grün-Weiß Brauweiler	Pulheim	
1996	TSV Siegen	1–0	SG Praunheim	Frankfurt/Main	
1997	Grün-Weiß Brauweiler †	1–1 * (5–3 pen.)	FC Rumeln-Kaldenhausen	Duisburg-Homberg	

== Single division Bundesliga (1997–present) ==
In 1997–98 the two Bundesliga divisions were merged into a uniform league of twelve teams.

Key

†	Champion also won DFB-Pokal
*	Champions also won the DFB-Pokal and UEFA Women's Champions League that season

Season	Champions	Runners-up	Third	Top scorer	Goals
1997–98	FSV Frankfurt	SG Praunheim	FCR Duisburg	Birgit Prinz	23
1998–99	1. FFC Frankfurt †	FCR Duisburg	Sportfreunde Siegen	Inka Grings	25
1999–00	FCR Duisburg	1. FFC Frankfurt	Sportfreunde Siegen	Inka Grings	38
2000–01	1. FFC Frankfurt †	Turbine Potsdam	FCR Duisburg	Birgit Prinz	24
2001–02	1. FFC Frankfurt *	Turbine Potsdam	FCR 2001 Duisburg	Conny Pohlers	27
2002–03	1. FFC Frankfurt †	Turbine Potsdam	FCR 2001 Duisburg	Inka Grings	20
2003–04	Turbine Potsdam †	1. FFC Frankfurt	Heike Rheine	Kerstin Garefrekes	26
2004–05	FFC Frankfurt	FCR 2001 Duisburg	Turbine Potsdam	Shelley Thompson	30
2005–06	Turbine Potsdam †	FCR 2001 Duisburg	FFC Frankfurt	Conny Pohlers	36
2006–07	1. FFC Frankfurt †	FCR 2001 Duisburg	Turbine Potsdam	Birgit Prinz	28
2007–08	1. FFC Frankfurt *	FCR 2001 Duisburg	Turbine Potsdam	Inka Grings	26
2008–09	Turbine Potsdam	Bayern Munich	FCR 2001 Duisburg	Inka Grings	29
2009–10	Turbine Potsdam	FCR 2001 Duisburg	1. FFC Frankfurt	Inka Grings	28
2010–11	Turbine Potsdam	FFC Frankfurt	FCR 2001 Duisburg	Conny Pohlers	25
2011–12	Turbine Potsdam	VfL Wolfsburg	1. FFC Frankfurt	Genoveva Añonma	22
2012–13	VfL Wolfsburg *	Turbine Potsdam	1. FFC Frankfurt	Yūki Ōgimi	18
2013–14	VfL Wolfsburg	FFC Frankfurt	Turbine Potsdam	Célia Šašić	20
2014–15	Bayern Munich	VfL Wolfsburg	1. FFC Frankfurt	Célia Šašić	21
2015–16	Bayern Munich	VfL Wolfsburg	1. FFC Frankfurt	Mandy Islacker	17
2016–17	VfL Wolfsburg †	Bayern Munich	Turbine Potsdam	Mandy Islacker	19
2017–18	VfL Wolfsburg †	Bayern Munich	SC Freiburg	Pernille Harder	17
2018–19	VfL Wolfsburg †	Bayern Munich	Turbine Potsdam	Ewa Pajor	24
2019–20	VfL Wolfsburg †	Bayern Munich	TSG Hoffenheim	Pernille Harder	27
2020–21	Bayern Munich	VfL Wolfsburg	TSG Hoffenheim	Nicole Billa	23
2021–22	VfL Wolfsburg †	Bayern Munich	Eintracht Frankfurt	Lea Schüller	16
2022–23	Bayern Munich	VfL Wolfsburg	Eintracht Frankfurt	Alexandra Popp	16
2023–24	Bayern Munich	VfL Wolfsburg	Eintracht Frankfurt	Ewa Pajor	18
2024–25	Bayern Munich †	VfL Wolfsburg	Eintracht Frankfurt	Lineth Beerensteyn/Selina Cerci	16
2025–26	Bayern Munich †	VfL Wolfsburg	Eintracht Frankfurt	Larissa Mühlhaus	17

== East German champions ==
Turbine Potsdam won six championships in the East Germany, making them the team with the most titles. The only other team to win more than one championship were the 1987 and 1988 title holders Rotation Schlema.

== Championships won by club ==
Fourteen different club have won at least one women's football championship. SSG Bergisch Gladbach won the most titles with nine championships. In addition to their six all-German championships Turbine Potsdam has won six East German championships. Tennis Borussia Berlin finished second three times, making them the club that came in most often second without ever winning a championship.

Club	Winners	Runners-up
SSG Bergisch Gladbach	9	2
Bayern Munich	8	10
VfL Wolfsburg	7	8
1. FFC Frankfurt	7	6
Turbine Potsdam	6	4
TSV Siegen	6	1
FSV Frankfurt	3	3
FCR 2001 Duisburg	1	7
Grün-Weiß Brauweiler	1	3
KBC Duisburg	1	2
SC 07 Bad Neuenahr	1	0
Bonner SC	1	0
TuS Niederkirchen	1	0
TuS Wörrstadt	1	0

== Titles by region ==
Region	Titles	Winning clubs
North Rhine-Westphalia	19	SSG Bergisch Gladbach (9), TSV Siegen (6), FCR 2001 Duisburg (1), Grün-Weiß Brauweiler (1), KBC Duisburg (1), Bonner SC (1)
Hesse	10	1. FFC Frankfurt (7), FSV Frankfurt (3)
Bavaria	8	Bayern Munich (8)
Lower Saxony	7	VfL Wolfsburg (7)
Brandenburg	6	Turbine Potsdam (6)
Rhineland-Palatinate	3	SC 07 Bad Neuenahr (1), TuS Niederkirchen (1), TuS Wörrstadt (1)

== See also ==
- German football champions
- Women's Bundesliga
