= Kubát =

Kubát (feminine: Kubátová) is a Czech surname, derived from the given name Jakub. Notable people with the surname include:

- Bohumil Kubát (1935–2016) Czech wrestler
- Eduard Kubat (1891–1976), German film producer
- Karel Kubát (born 1988), Czech ice hockey player
- Michaela Kubat (born 1969), German footballer
- Mike Kubat, Canadian television writer
