= TSV Fortuna Sachsenross =

German sports club

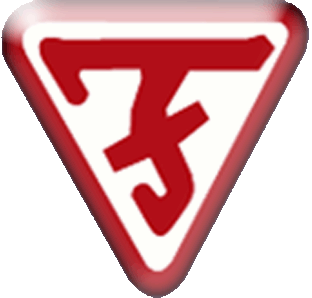
- Full name: Turn- und Sportverein Fortuna Sachsenross von 1891 e.V.
- Founded: 1971
- Chairman: Heinz Petersen
- Coach: Andreas Wilke
- League: Kreisliga Hannover (VIII)
- 2015–16: Bezirksliga Hannover 2 (VII), 13th ↓
Home colours	Away colours

Turn- und Sportverein Fortuna Sachsenross von 1891 e.V. is a German sports club for football and pétanque based in Hanover. The club's roots are convoluted and can be traced to several local clubs, the oldest of those going back to 1891.

== History ==
The Turnerbund Sachsenroß von 1891 was founded in a suburb of Hanover in 1891. The Arbeitersportverein List von 1893 followed two years later. Another ancestor of the club, Freie Turnerschaft Hannover, Abtlg. Buchholz was the first to offer football, but the football department left the club in 1923 to form an independent football club, since known as OSV Hannover. In 1924 the footballers of List, now renamed to Freie Turnerschaft Hannover, Abtlg. List, also formed an independent club named Freie Sportvereinigung Wacker. Many members of Wacker joined the sports club of the local waterworks and in 1933 that club was renamed to Fortuna von 1933.

After World War II 74 former members of Wacker, Fortuna, and Buchholz founded the TSV Fortuna von 1946. When the local authorities moved Turnerbund Sachsenroß from their former residence at Clausewitzstraße to Wietzegraben Fortuna and Sachsenroß became neighbours. The city also wanted to support the local sports and thus planned to build larger sports facilities. A prerequisite was that Sachsenross and Fortuna would merge to form a joint club. TSV Fortuna/Sachsenroß von 1891 e.V. was thus founded in 1971.

== Football ==
Fortuna Sachsenross today offers men's football only. They have six senior men's sides and seventeen junior sides. The first men's team is playing in the seventh tier Kreisliga Hannover after relegation from the Bezirksliga Hannover via playoffs in 2016. The most well known former player of Fortuna Sachsenross is Mirko Slomka.

== Women's football ==
The club is most famous for its original women's football team, that was a member of the Bundesliga from 1990 to 1997. When in 1997 the two divisions of the Bundesliga were united to form a uniform Bundesliga Fortuna Sachsenross qualified, but decided to refrain from participating for financial reasons. The women's team was disbanded a few years later. A new women's section was established late in 2009 but played only in Hannover's city cup and was folded after that.

=== Statistics ===
Season	League	Pos	W	D	L	F	A	Pts	DFB-Pokal
1990–91	Bundesliga Nord (I)	7	5	5	8	26	38	15	nq
1991–92	Bundesliga Nord	8	6	4	10	22	39	16	2nd round
1992–93	Bundesliga Nord	4	9	3	6	32	26	22	3rd round
1993–94	Bundesliga Nord	5	8	3	7	38	37	19	1st round
1994–95	Bundesliga Nord	5	9	1	8	41	41	19	Quarter-final
1995–96	Bundesliga Nord	5	7	2	9	31	50	23	Quarter-final
1996–97	Bundesliga Nord	6	4	4	10	24	45	16	3rd round
Red marks a season followed by relegation.
