= Sandra Smisek =

German footballer (born 1977)

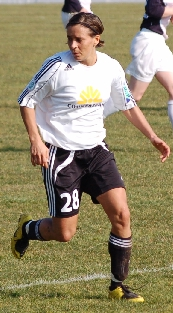
- Smisek in 2008

Personal information
- Full name: Sandra Smisek
- Date of birth: 3 July 1977 (age 49)
- Place of birth: Frankfurt am Main, West Germany
- Height: 1.63 m (5 ft 4 in)
- Positions: Midfielder; striker

Youth career
- 1984–1990: FC Kalbach

Senior career*
Years	Team	Apps	(Gls)
1992–1998	FSV Frankfurt	22	(20)
1998–2001	FCR Duisburg	44	(25)
2001–2005	FSV Frankfurt	65	(20)
2005–2013	FFC Frankfurt	140	(48)
Total		271	(113)

International career
1995–2008	Germany	133	(34)
Medal record
Representing Germany
Olympic Games
Bronze medal – third place	2008 Beijing	Team competition
World Cup
Gold medal – first place	2003 United States	Team
Gold medal – first place	2007 China	Team
Silver medal – second place	1995 Sweden	Team
- * Club domestic league appearances and goals

Sandra Smisek (born 3 July 1977) is a former German footballer, who played as a striker in Germany for FSV Frankfurt, FCR Duisburg and FFC Frankfurt, as well as for the German national team.

Smisek has played for Germany at three Women's World Cup finals.

== International career ==
Smisek made her debut for Germany on 13 April 1995 as a substitute for Patricia Brocker, also scoring her first goal in an 8–0 home victory against Poland. She was included in the 1995 FIFA Women's World Cup squad led by manager Gero Bisanz, her first major tournament, where she managed only one appearance, as a replacement for Maren Meinert in the 0–2 final defeat against Norway.

Smisek also represented Germany at the 1996 Summer Olympics, but never played once as Germany were eliminated in the group stage.

Under new manager Tina Theune, she established herself in the first team, playing in all of Germany's matches in the 1999 FIFA Women's World Cup until their 2–3 deficit against the United States in the quarter-finals, scoring against Mexico.

Smisek also appeared in the UEFA Women's Euro 2001, where she scored against Russia, and Norway, to finish as joint top goalscorer with three goals alongside compatriot Claudia Müller, and help Germany to their fifth title.

== Career statistics ==
=== International ===
National team	Season	Apps	Goals
Germany	1995	5	1
Germany	1996	6	1
Germany	1997	14	4
Germany	1998	8	3
Germany	1999	13	2
Germany	2000	8	1
Germany	2001	15	7
Germany	2002	10	0
Germany	2003	6	1
Germany	2004	6	1
Germany	2005	11	3
Germany	2006	9	3
Germany	2007	12	4
Germany	2008	10	3
Total		133	34

=== International goals ===
Scores and results list Germany's goal tally first.

#	Date	Venue	Opponent	Score	Result	Competition
1.	13 April 1995	Karl-Liebknecht-Stadion, Potsdam	Poland	7–0	8–0	Friendly
2.	5 May 1996	GWG-Stadion, Gifhorn	Finland	1–0	6–0	1997 Women's Championship qualifier
3.	24 April 1997	Stadion an der Lohmühle, Lübeck	Spain	2–0	6–0	Friendly
4.	24 April 1997	Stadion an der Lohmühle, Lübeck	Spain	3–0	6–0	Friendly
5.	25 September 1997	Paul Greifzu Stadium, Dessau	England	2–0	3–0	1999 Women's World Cup qualifier
6.	9 October 1997	MSV-Arena, Duisburg	United States	1–1	3–1	Friendly
7.	8 March 1998	The New Den, London	England	1–0	1–0	1999 Women's World Cup qualifier
8.	26 May 1998	Stadion Dresden, Dresden	New Zealand	2–0	4–1	Friendly
9.	17 September 1998	Sportpark Johannisau, Fulda	Ukraine	1–0	5–0	1999 Women's World Cup play-off qualifier
10.	25 June 1999	Providence Park, Portland	Mexico	2–0	6–0	1999 Women's World Cup
11.	2 September 1999	Vogtlandstadion, Plauen	Russia	2–1	3–1	Friendly
12.	6 April 2000	Stadion am Bornheimer Hang, Frankfurt	Italy	3–0	3–0	2001 Women's Championship qualifier
13.	17 June 2001	Niederrheinstadion, Oberhausen	Canada	5–0	7–1	Friendly
14.	17 June 2001	Niederrheinstadion, Oberhausen	Canada	6–1	7–1	Friendly
15.	27 June 2001	Steigerwaldstadion, Erfurt	Russia	4–0	5–0	Women's Euro 2001
16.	27 June 2001	Steigerwaldstadion, Erfurt	Russia	5–0	5–0	Women's Euro 2001
17.	4 July 2001	Donaustadion, Ulm	Norway	1–0	1–0	Women's Euro 2001
18.	27 September 2001	Auestadion, Kassel	England	2–0	3–1	2005 Women's Championship qualifier
19.	27 September 2001	Auestadion, Kassel	England	3–0	3–1	2005 Women's Championship qualifier
20.	15 November 2003	Stadion an der Kreuzeiche, Reutlingen	Portugal	5–0	13–0	2005 Women's Championship qualifier
21.	28 April 2004	Marschweg-Stadion, Oldenburg	Ukraine	4–0	6–0	2005 Women's Championship qualifier
22.	9 March 2005	Estádio Municipal Fernando Cabrita, Lagos	Sweden	1–0	2–1	2005 Algarve Cup
23.	13 March 2005	Estádio da Restinga, Portimão	China	1–0	2–0	2005 Algarve Cup
24.	25 September 2005	Leimbachstadion, Siegen	Russia	5–1	5–1	2007 Women's World Cup qualifier
25.	23 September 2006	McDiarmid Park, Perth	Scotland	5–0	5–0	2007 Women's World Cup qualifier
26.	27 September 2006	Eduard Streltsov Stadium, Moscow	Russia	1–0	3–2	2007 Women's World Cup qualifier
27.	25 October 2006	Städtisches Waldstadion, Aalen	England	2–1	5–1	Friendly
28.	10 September 2007	Hongkou Football Stadium, Shanghai	Argentina	7–0	11–0	2007 Women's World Cup
29.	10 September 2007	Hongkou Football Stadium, Shanghai	Argentina	9–0	11–0	2007 Women's World Cup
30.	10 September 2007	Hongkou Football Stadium, Shanghai	Argentina	10–0	11–0	2007 Women's World Cup
31.	22 August 2007	Stadion Oberwerth, Koblenz	Switzerland	1–0	7–0	Women's Euro 2009 qualifier
32.	10 March 2008	Municipal Stadium, Vila Real de Santo António	Sweden	1–0	2–0	2008 Algarve Cup
33.	17 July 2008	Generali Sportpark, Unterhaching	England	1–0	3–0	Friendly
34.	1 October 2008	Stadion Schützenmatte, Basel	Switzerland	3–0	3–0	Women's Euro 2009 qualifier

== Honours ==
FSV Frankfurt

- Bundesliga: Winner 1994–95, 1997–98
- DFB-Pokal: Winner 1994–95, 1995–96
- DFB-Hallenpokal: Winner 1994–95

FCR Duisburg

- Bundesliga: Winner 1999–2000
- DFB-Hallenpokal: Winner 1999–2000

FFC Frankfurt

- Bundesliga: Winner 2006–07, 2007–08
- DFB-Pokal: Winner 2006–07, 2007–08, 2010–11
- DFB-Hallenpokal: Winner 2005–06, 2006–07
- UEFA Women's Cup: Winner 2005–06, 2007–08

Germany

- FIFA Women's World Cup: Winner 2003, 2007
- UEFA Women's Championship: Winner 1997, 2001, 2005
- Algarve Cup: Winner 2006
- Nordic Cup: Winner 1995
- Super Cup: Winner 1995

Individual

- Bundesliga top goalscorer: 1995–96
- UEFA Women's Championship top goalscorer (shared): 2001
