= Claudia Tschöke =

German footballer

Personal information
- Birth name: Claudia Lübbers
- Date of birth: 18 June 1978 (age 48)
- Position: Midfielder

International career
Years	Team	Apps	(Gls)
1994–1996	Germany	8	(2)

Claudia Tschöke (née Lübbers; born 18 June 1978) is a German former footballer who played as a midfielder. She made eight appearances for the Germany national team from 1994 to 1996.
