= Regine Israel =

German footballer

Personal information
- Date of birth: 10 December 1958 (age 67)
- Position: Midfielder

International career
Years	Team	Apps	(Gls)
1984–1985	Germany	2	(0)

Regine Israel (born 10 December 1958) is a German former footballer who played as a midfielder. She played in two matches for the Germany women's national football team from 1984 to 1985.
