= Heidi Mohr =

German international footballer (1967–2019)

Personal information
- Date of birth: 29 May 1967
- Place of birth: Weinheim, West Germany
- Date of death: 7 February 2019 (aged 51)
- Height: 1.67 m (5 ft 6 in)
- Position: Forward

Senior career*
Years	Team	Apps	(Gls)
1986–1994	TuS Niederkirchen	83	(114)
1994–1995	TuS Ahrbach	22	(27)
1995-1999	TuS Niederkirchen	75	(38+)
1995–2000	1. FFC Frankfurt	11	(2)
Total		191	(181+)

International career
1986–1996	Germany	104	(83)
- * Club domestic league appearances and goals

Heidi Mohr (29 May 1967 – 7 February 2019) was a German footballer who played as a forward. She was renowned for her speed and her ability to shoot with both feet. In 1999 she was voted Europe's Footballer of the Century.

== Club career ==
Mohr played in the Bundesliga for TuS Ahrbach, TuS Niederkirchen, and 1. FFC Frankfurt. She was top scorer in the Bundesliga for five consecutive years from 1991 to 1995.

== International career ==
Mohr's debut was against Norway on 19 May 1986. She had 104 appearances for Germany's national team and won the 1989, 1991 and 1995 Women's EURO. She scored eight times at European Championships and ten times at World Cups. With 83 career goals she was Germany's all-time top scorer until Birgit Prinz overtook her in 2005. Mohr's last game was on 29 September 1996 against Iceland.

Heidi Mohr competed in two FIFA Women's World Cup: China 1991 and Sweden 1995; and one Olympics: Atlanta 1996; played 15 matches and scored 11 goals Mohr with her Germany team finished third at the 1991 Women's World Cup, held in China.

== Death ==
Mohr died in February 2019, aged 51, after suffering from cancer.

== Career statistics ==
=== International goals ===
Scores and results list Germany's goal tally first, score column indicates score after each Mohr goal.

List of international goals scored by Heidi Mohr
No.	Date	Venue	Opponent	Score	Result	Competition	Ref.
1	27 July 1986	Kópavogsvöllur, Kópavogur, Island	Iceland	3–0	4–1	Friendly	
2	19 November 1986	Eintracht-Stadion am Heideweg, Nordhorn, Germany	Netherlands	1–0	3–1	Friendly	
3	17 September 1988	Spiegelfeld, Binningen, Switzerland	Switzerland	2–0	10–0	1989 European Competition for Women's Football qualifying	
4	17 September 1988	Spiegelfeld, Binningen, Switzerland	Switzerland	3–0	10–0	1989 European Competition for Women's Football qualifying	
5	17 September 1988	Spiegelfeld, Binningen, Switzerland	Switzerland	7–0	10–0	1989 European Competition for Women's Football qualifying	
6	17 September 1988	Spiegelfeld, Binningen, Switzerland	Switzerland	8–0	10–0	1989 European Competition for Women's Football qualifying	
7	17 December 1988	Fritz-Walter-Stadion, Kaiserslautern, Germany	Czechoslovakia	2–0	2–0	1989 European Competition for Women's Football qualifying	
8	2 July 1989	Stadion an der Bremer Brücke, Osnabrück, Germany	Norway	3–0	4–1	1989 European Competition for Women's Football	
9	21 March 1989	?	Bulgaria	2–0	3–1	Friendly	
10	22 November 1989	Georg-Gaßmann-Stadion, Marburg, Germany	Czechoslovakia	2–0	5–0	UEFA Women's Euro 1991 qualifying	
11	22 November 1989	Georg-Gaßmann-Stadion, Marburg, Germany	Czechoslovakia	5–0	5–0	UEFA Women's Euro 1991 qualifying	
12	22 November 1989	Stadion Georgi Asparuhov, Sofia, Bulgaria	Bulgaria	2–0	4–1	UEFA Women's Euro 1991 qualifying	
13	5 August 1990	National Sports Center, Blaine, Minnesota, United States	England	2–0	3–1	Friendly	
14	5 August 1990	National Sports Center, Blaine, Minnesota, United States	England	3–0	3–1	Friendly	
15	9 August 1990	National Sports Center, Blaine, Minnesota, United States	United States II	2–1	3–2	Friendly	
16	26 September 1990	Rheinstadion, Düsseldorf, Germany	Bulgaria	4–0	4–0	UEFA Women's Euro 1991 qualifying	
17	25 November 1990	Adams Park, High Wycombe, England	England	1–0	4–1	UEFA Women's Euro 1991 qualifying	
18	25 November 1990	Adams Park, High Wycombe, England	England	3–1	4–1	UEFA Women's Euro 1991 qualifying	
19	25 November 1990	Adams Park, High Wycombe, England	England	4–1	4–1	UEFA Women's Euro 1991 qualifying	
20	28 March 1991	?	France	1–0	2–0	Friendly	
21	30 June 1991	Nattenberg Stadion, Lüdenscheid, Germany	Netherlands	2–0	2–0	Friendly	
22	11 July 1991	Frederikshavn Stadion, Frederikshavn, Denmark	Italy	1–0	3–0	UEFA Women's Euro 1991	
23	11 July 1991	Frederikshavn Stadion, Frederikshavn, Denmark	Italy	2–0	3–0	UEFA Women's Euro 1991	
24	14 July 1991	Aalborg Stadion, Aalborg, Denmark	Norway	1–1	3–1 (a.e.t.)	UEFA Women's Euro 1991	
25	14 July 1991	Aalborg Stadion, Aalborg, Denmark	Norway	2–1	3–1 (a.e.t.)	UEFA Women's Euro 1991	
26	28 August 1991	Städtisches Sportzentrum Nonnenholz, Weil am Rhein, Germany	Switzerland	2–1	3–1	Friendly	
27	28 August 1991	Städtisches Sportzentrum Nonnenholz, Weil am Rhein, Germany	Switzerland	3–1	3–1	Friendly	
28	25 September 1991	Wittmann Antal park, Mosonmagyaróvár, Hungary	Hungary	2–0	2–0	Friendly	
29	17 November 1991	Jiangmen Stadium, Jiangmen, China	Nigeria	2–0	4–0	1991 FIFA Women's World Cup	
30	17 November 1991	Jiangmen Stadium, Jiangmen, China	Nigeria	3–0	4–0	1991 FIFA Women's World Cup	
31	19 November 1991	Zhongshan Sports Center Stadium, Zhongshan, China	Chinese Taipei	2–0	3–0	1991 FIFA Women's World Cup	
32	19 November 1991	Zhongshan Sports Center Stadium, Zhongshan, China	Chinese Taipei	3–0	3–0	1991 FIFA Women's World Cup	
33	21 November 1991	Zhongshan Sports Center Stadium, Zhongshan, China	Italy	1–0	2–0	1991 FIFA Women's World Cup	
34	24 November 1991	Zhongshan Sports Center Stadium, Zhongshan, China	Denmark	2–1	2–1 (a.e.t.)	1991 FIFA Women's World Cup	
35	27 November 1991	Guangdong Provincial Stadium, Guangdong, China	United States	1–3	2–5	1991 FIFA Women's World Cup	
36	28 May 1992	Stadion Georgi Asparuhov, Sofia, Bulgaria	Yugoslavia	3–0	3–0	UEFA Women's Euro 1993 qualifying	
37	2 September 1992	Friedrich-Moebus-Stadion, Bad Kreuznach, Germany	France	3–0	7–0	Friendly	
38	2 September 1992	Friedrich-Moebus-Stadion, Bad Kreuznach, Germany	France	6–0	7–0	Friendly	
39	5 September 1992	Stadion Miejski, Jaworzno, Poland	Poland	2–0	4–0	Friendly	
40	5 September 1992	Stadion Miejski, Jaworzno, Poland	Poland	4–0	4–0	Friendly	
41	11 October 1992	Eduard Streltsov Stadium, Moscow, Russia	Russia	6–0	7–0	UEFA Women's Euro 1993 qualifying	
42	12 March 1993	Ayia Napa Municipal Stadium, Ayia Napa, Cyprus	France	2–0	3–0	Friendly	
43	12 March 1993	Ayia Napa Municipal Stadium, Ayia Napa, Cyprus	France	3–0	3–0	Friendly	
44	14 March 1993	Ayia Napa Municipal Stadium, Ayia Napa, Cyprus	United States	1–0	1–0	Friendly	
45	30 June 1993	Stadio Romeo Neri, Rimini, Italy	Italy	1–0	1–1; 4–3 (pen.)	UEFA Women's Euro 1993	
46	22 September 1993	?	Sweden	2–1	2–3	Friendly	
47	25 September 1993	Sportpark Risthaus, Rhade, Germany	Norway	2–1	3–1	Friendly	
48	24 October 1993	Stadion Niedermatten, Wohlen, Switzerland	Switzerland	2–0	5–0	UEFA Women's Euro 1995 qualifying	
49	24 October 1993	Stadion Niedermatten, Wohlen, Switzerland	Switzerland	5–0	5–0	UEFA Women's Euro 1995 qualifying	
50	8 December 1993	?	Poland	4–0	7–0	Friendly	
51	8 December 1993	?	Poland	6–0	7–0	Friendly	
52	31 March 1994	Schüco Arena, Bielefeld, Germany	Wales	1–0	12–0	UEFA Women's Euro 1995 qualifying	
53	2 June 1994	Stadion Kranjčevićeva, Zagreb, Croatia	Croatia	1–0	7–0	UEFA Women's Euro 1995 qualifying	
54	2 June 1994	Stadion Kranjčevićeva, Zagreb, Croatia	Croatia	3–0	7–0	UEFA Women's Euro 1995 qualifying	
55	2 August 1994	Bensalem Township Memorial Stadium, Oakford, USA	Norway	5–3	6–3	Friendly	
56	6 August 1994	?	China	1–3	2–3	Friendly	
57	6 August 1994	?	China	2–3	2–3	Friendly	
58	7 September 1994	?	Sweden	1–0	3–1	Friendly	
59	25 September 1994	Arena Weingarten, Weingarten, Germany	Switzerland	3–0	11–0	UEFA Women's Euro 1995 qualifying	
60	25 September 1994	Arena Weingarten, Weingarten, Germany	Switzerland	10–0	11–0	UEFA Women's Euro 1995 qualifying	
61	9 October 1994	Stroitel Stadium, Selyatino, Russia	Russia	1–0	1–0	UEFA Women's Euro 1995 qualifying	
62	27 October 1994	Stadion an der Bremer Brücke, Osnabrück, Germany	Russia	1–0	4–0	UEFA Women's Euro 1995 qualifying	
63	27 October 1994	Stadion an der Bremer Brücke, Osnabrück, Germany	Russia	4–0	4–0	UEFA Women's Euro 1995 qualifying	
64	11 December 1994	Vicarage Road, Watford, England	England	1–1	4–1	UEFA Women's Euro 1995	
65	11 December 1994	Vicarage Road, Watford, England	England	3–1	4–1	UEFA Women's Euro 1995	
66	13 April 1995	Karl-Liebknecht-Stadion, Potsdam, Germany	Poland	3–0	8–0	Friendly	
67	13 April 1995	Karl-Liebknecht-Stadion, Potsdam, Germany	Poland	6–0	8–0	Friendly	
68	23 May 1995	?	Switzerland	3–0	8–0	Friendly	
69	23 May 1995	?	Switzerland	4–0	8–0	Friendly	
70	9 June 1995	Tingvalla IP, Karlstad, Sweden	Brazil	4–1	6–1	1995 FIFA Women's World Cup	
71	9 June 1995	Tingvalla IP, Karlstad, Sweden	Brazil	5–1	6–1	1995 FIFA Women's World Cup	
72	13 June 1995	Arosvallen, Västerås, Sweden	England	3–0	3–0	1995 FIFA Women's World Cup	
73	20 September 1995	Tampere Stadium, Tampere, Finland	Finland	2–0	3–0	UEFA Women's Euro 1997 qualifying	
74	25 October 1995	Štadión Pasienky, Bratislava, Slovakia	Slovenia	2–0	3–0	UEFA Women's Euro 1997 qualifying	
75	5 May 1996	GWG-Stadion, Gifhorn, Germany	Finland	2–0	6–0	UEFA Women's Euro 1997 qualifying	
76	5 May 1996	GWG-Stadion, Gifhorn, Germany	Finland	3–0	6–0	UEFA Women's Euro 1997 qualifying	
77	28 June 1996	Seppl-Herberger-Stadion, Mannheim, Germany	Iceland	1–0	8–0	Friendly	
78	28 June 1996	Seppl-Herberger-Stadion, Mannheim, Germany	Iceland	2–0	8–0	Friendly	
79	28 June 1996	Seppl-Herberger-Stadion, Mannheim, Germany	Iceland	8–0	8–0	Friendly	
80	30 June 1996	Stadion im Brötzinger Tal, Pforzheim, Germany	Iceland	2–0	3–0	Friendly	
81	21 July 1996	Legion Field, Birmingham, Germany	Japan	3–2	3–2	1996 Summer Olympics	
82	27 August 1996	?	Netherlands	2–0	3–0	Friendly	
83	29 September 1996	Stadion Oberwerth, Koblenz, Germany	Iceland	1–0	4–0	UEFA Women's Euro 1997 qualifying	

== Honours ==
TuS Niederkirchen

- Bundesliga: 1992–93

1. FFC Frankfurt

- Bundesliga: 1998–99
- DFB-Pokal: 1998–99, 1999–2000

Germany

- UEFA Women's Championship: 1989, 1991, 1995

Individual

- Bundesliga top scorer: 1990–91, 1991–92, 1992–93, 1993–94, 1994–95
- UEFA Women's Championship top scorer: 1991
- FIFA Women's World Cup Silver Shoe: 1991
- Silbernes Lorbeerblatt: 1989, 1991, 1995
