= Monika Meyer (footballer) =

German footballer

Personal information
- Date of birth: 23 June 1972 (age 54)
- Place of birth: Berlin, Germany
- Height: 1.73 m (5 ft 8 in)
- Position: Forward

Senior career*
Years	Team	Apps	(Gls)
- 1. FFC Frankfurt

International career
1997–1999	Germany	27	(5)
- * Club domestic league appearances and goals

Monika Meyer (born 23 June 1972 in Berlin) is a retired German football striker. She scored 5 goals in 27 caps for the German national team between 1997 and 1999.
