= Michaela Kubat =

German footballer

Personal information
- Date of birth: 10 April 1972 (age 54)
- Position: Striker

Senior career*
Years	Team	Apps	(Gls)
- Grün-Weiß Brauweiler
- TSV Siegen
- FC Rumeln-Kaldenhausen

International career
1991-1993	Germany	11	(2)
- * Club domestic league appearances and goals

Michaela Kubat (born 10 April 1972) is a former German football striker. Her career started at Grün-Weiß Brauweiler and with Brauweiler she won the German Cup in 1991. After banding up with TSV Siegen in 1992 she won another German Cup and two national championships in 1994 and 1996. She moved than to FC Rumeln-Kaldenhausen and won the German Cup again in 1998.

Michaela Kubat had 11 appearances for the German national team, scoring twice. She had her first score in her debut in 1991 against Switzerland. Her last appearance in 1993 was also against Switzerland.

== Honours ==
- German Championship: 1994, 1996
- German Cup: 1991, 1993, 1998
