= 1. FFC 08 Niederkirchen =

German women's association football club

- Full name: 1. Frauenfußballclub 08 Niederkirchen e.V.
- Founded: 25 April 2008
- Ground: Sportgelände Nachtweide Niederkirchen
- Chairman: Tina Weisbrodt
- Head Coach: Torben Meyer
- League: 2. Bundesliga
- 2015–16: Regionalliga (Südwest), 1st (promoted)
- Website: https://www.ffc-niederkirchen.de/
Home colours	Away colours

1. FFC 08 Niederkirchen (formerly TuS Niederkirchen) is a German women's football club based in Niederkirchen, Rhineland-Palatinate. The team plays in the German 2. Bundesliga.

== History ==
=== TuS Niederkirchen ===
TuS Niederkirchen was founded in 1900. Since 1969 the club had a women's football department, which was a member of the women's Bundesliga at its inception. After winning the championship in 1992–93 the club was relegated to the Regionalliga in 2000. Several seasons of promotions and relegations followed. In the last season at TuS Niederkirchen the club finished 9th in the 2. Bundesliga. When the club's management decided not to apply for a license for the next season, but did not inform the players about that decision, the entire women's section left the club to found their own. On 25 April 2008 1. FFC 08 Niederkirchen was established, and began playing in the Regionalliga Südwest in 2008–09.

=== 1. FFC 08 Niederkirchen ===
After two years in the Regionalliga, the team returned to the 2nd Bundesliga as champions in 2010 and secured its place in the league on the antepenultimate match day. In April 2011 a co-operation - initially lasting two years - was announced with 1. FC Kaiserslautern from 1 July 2011, which was extended by two years in July 2013. In 2015, the team was relegated from the 2nd Bundesliga, but managed direct re-promotion in 2016. Two years later, 1. FFC was relegated again before being promoted after the 2019–20 season.

== Honours ==
- Champion of the Fußball-Bundesliga (women): 1993
- Winner of the SWFV association cup: 2005, 2010
- Champion of the Regionalliga Südwest: 2005

== Notable past players ==
- (Germany) Nicole Bender
- (Germany) Nadine Fols
- (Germany) Steffi Jones
- (Germany) Heidi Mohr
- (Germany) Conny Pohlers
- (Germany) Carmen Roth
- (Switzerland) Sandra de Pol

== Statistics ==
=== TuS Niederkirchen ===
Season	League	Place	W	D	L	GF	GA	Pts	DFB-Pokal
1990–91	Bundesliga Süd (I)	SF (2)	12	2	4	65	21	26	not qualified
1991–92	Bundesliga Süd	SF (2)	14	3	3	40	15	31	Quarter-finals
1992–93	Bundesliga Süd	won (1)	15	2	1	52	9	32	Quarter-finals
1993–94	Bundesliga Süd	SF (1)	14	2	2	71	24	30	3rd round
1994–95	Bundesliga Süd	6	7	2	9	33	34	16	2nd round
1995–96	Bundesliga Süd	3	11	2	5	49	26	35	3rd round
1996–97	Bundesliga Süd	3	8	5	5	36	30	29	3rd round
1997–98	Bundesliga (I)	9	5	5	12	26	44	20	Semi-finals
1998–99	Bundesliga	8	7	3	12	26	54	24	3rd round
1999–00	Bundesliga	11	2	3	17	16	63	14	3rd round
2000–01	Oberliga Südwest (II)	1	19	2	1	73	11	59	1st round
2001–02	Regionalliga Südwest (II)	1	22	0	0	103	11	66	1st round
2002–03	Bundesliga	12	0	2	20	10	77	2	3rd round
2003–04	Regionalliga Südwest	1	20	1	1	99	7	61	1st round ^{1}
2004–05	Regionalliga Südwest	1	18	1	1	110	9	55	1st round
2005–06	2. Bundesliga Süd (II)	5	12	3	7	56	46	39	2nd round
2006–07	2. Bundesliga Süd	6	8	3	11	36	35	27	1st round
2007–08	2. Bundesliga Süd	9	5	5	12	29	58	20	2nd round
Green marks a season followed by promotion, red a season followed by relegation.

^{1} The second team of TuS Niederkirchen was also qualified and reached the round of 16.

=== 1. FFC 08 Niederkirchen ===
Season	League	Place	W	D	L	GF	GA	Pts	DFB-Pokal
2008–09	Regionalliga Südwest (III)	3	14	3	5	71	27	45	2nd round
2009–10	Regionalliga Südwest (III)	1	21	1	2	113	21	64	1st round
2010–11	2. Bundesliga Süd	7	8	4	10	37	51	28	2nd round
2011–12	2. Bundesliga Süd	6	10	3	9	43	44	33	2nd round
2012–13	2. Bundesliga Süd	9	6	4	12	37	40	22	1st round
2013–14	2. Bundesliga Süd	7	9	3	10	47	51	30	2nd round
2014–15	2. Bundesliga Süd	12	4	6	12	29	49	18	3rd round
2015–16	Regionalliga Südwest	1	21	1	0	90	8	64	1st round
2016–17	2. Bundesliga Süd	9	7	2	13	23	42	23	1st round
2017–18	2. Bundesliga Süd	10	4	4	14	18	54	16	2nd round
2018–19	Regionalliga Südwest	2	18	4	4	87	24	66	2nd round
2019–20	Regionalliga Südwest	1	13	2	0	52	8	41	1st round
Green marks a season followed by promotion, red a season followed by relegation.
