= Katja Bornschein =

German footballer

Personal information
- Date of birth: 16 March 1972 (age 54)
- Place of birth: Germany
- Position: Forward

Senior career*
| Years | Team | Apps | (Gls) |
| 1996 | FSV Frankfurt | | |

International career
| 1996 | Germany | 31 (?) | |
- * Club domestic league appearances and goals

Katja Bornschein (born 16 March 1972) is a German former footballer who played as a forward.

She was part of the Germany women's national football team at the 1996 Summer Olympics, but did not compete. On club level she played for FSV Frankfurt.

On 2 September 1990, at 11:05 CEST, she scored the first goal of the Frauen-Bundesliga.

== See also ==
- Germany at the 1996 Summer Olympics
