= Silke Rottenberg =

German footballer (born 1972)

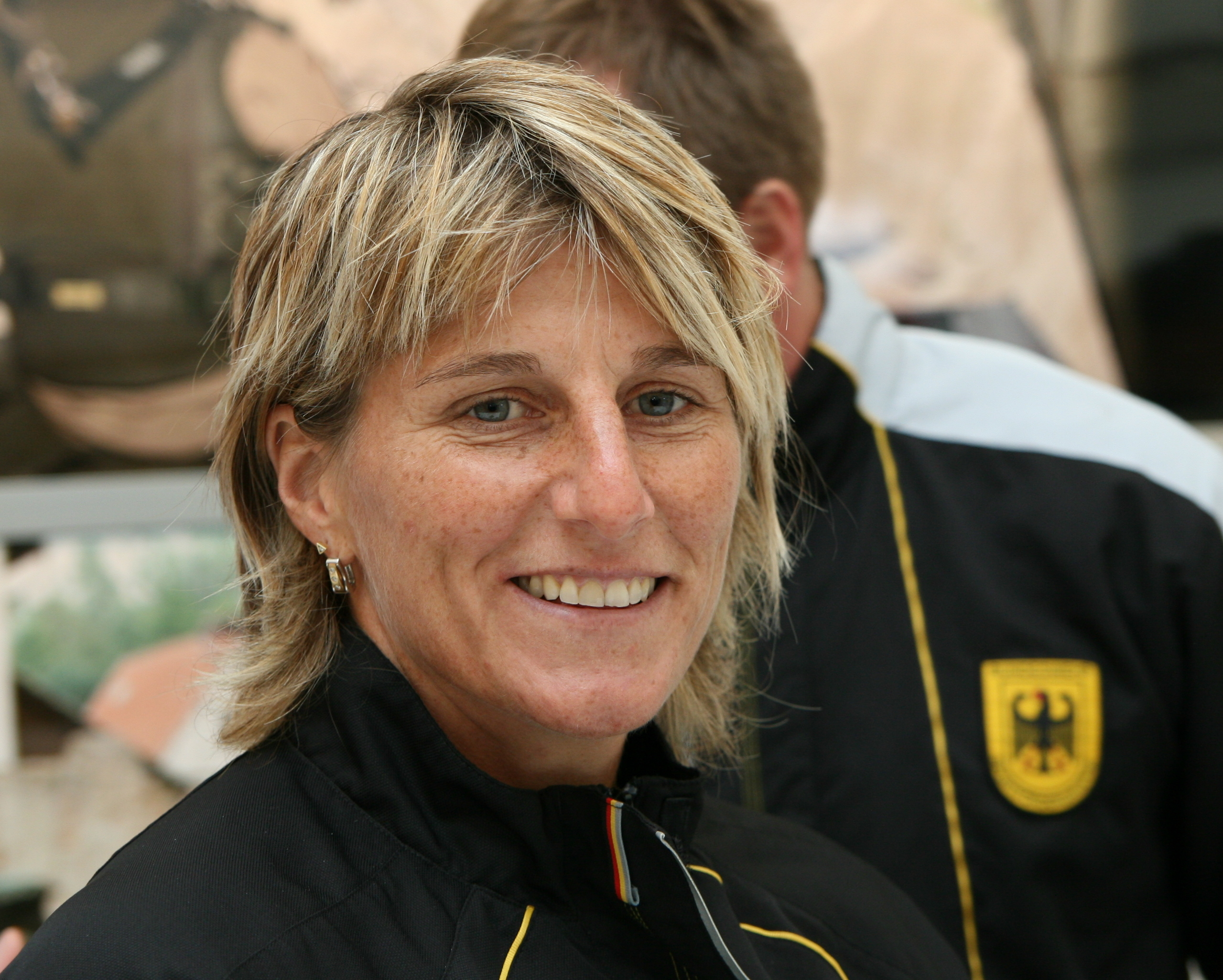

Personal information
- Full name: Silke Rottenberg
- Date of birth: 25 January 1972 (age 54)
- Place of birth: Euskirchen, West Germany
- Position: Goalkeeper

Team information
- Current team: 1.FFC Frankfurt
- Number: 1

Youth career
- 1976–1984: SC Enzen-Dürscheven
- 1984–1988: VfL Euskirchen

Senior career*
Years	Team	Apps	(Gls)
1988–1991	Grün-Weiß Brauweiler		
1991–1996	TSV Siegen		
1996–2000	Sportfreunde Siegen		
2000–2003	FFC Brauweiler Pulheim		
2003–2006	FCR 2001 Duisburg		
2006–2008	1.FFC Frankfurt		

International career^{‡}
1993–2008	Germany	125	(-)

Managerial career
- 2009–: Germany Youth
- 2009–: Germany U-20
Medal record
Women's football
Representing Germany
Olympic Games
Bronze medal – third place	2000 Sydney	Team competition
Bronze medal – third place	2004 Athens	Team competition
- * Club domestic league appearances and goals ‡ National team caps and goals as of 11 March 2008

Silke Rottenberg (born 25 January 1972) is a former German football goalkeeper.

== Career ==
She last played for 1. FFC Frankfurt. She announced her retirement from the German national team on 27 May 2008. After the game Germany versus Wales on 29 May 2008, she formally retired from international football. In 1998 she was selected German Female Footballer of the Year. Silke announced her retirement on 10 December 2008 from professional football.

== Honours ==
=== Germany ===
- UEFA Women's Championship: Winner 1997, 2001, 2005
- FIFA Women's World Cup winner: 2003, 2007

== Coaching career ==
Rottenberg works up 1 January 2009 as Goalkeeper Coach from Germany U-15 between Germany U-23 by German Football Association (DFB).
