= TuS Ahrbach =

German sports club

- Full name: Turn- und Sportverein Ahrbach 1921
- Founded: 1921; 105 years ago
- Ground: Sportanlage Ruppach-Goldhausen (Ruppach-Goldhausen)
- Chairman: Rudolf Bauch
- Head coach: Klaus Pörtner
- League: Bezirksliga Rheinland-Ost (V)
- 2015–16: 8th
Home colours	Away colours

TuS Ahrbach is a German sports club based in Ruppach-Goldhausen, Rhineland-Palatinate. The club was founded in 1921 and today has departments for football, handball, and gymnastics. It is best known for its women's football section, which played in the German Bundesliga for several years.

== History ==
In 1921 SV 21 Goldhausen was founded. TuS Ahrbach's first predecessor was a club for athletics and football. Also in 1921, a similar club was formed in nearby Ruppach (SV Ruppach). Both clubs merged in 1937 to become SV Goldhausen-Ruppach. Scarcity of players led in 1951 to a merger with SV Heiligenroth. Goldhausen-Ruppach and Heiligenroth split up in 1959, but merged their clubs again in 1970, now under the name of TuS Ahrbach. In 1985, a new SV Heiligenroth separated from Ahrbach.

The women's football department was established in 1976. Its greatest success was the vice-championship in 1989, when they lost the final game to SSG 09 Bergisch Gladbach. In the following season they did not qualify for the initial Bundesliga though. After promotion a year later six seasons of Bundesliga football from 1991-1997 followed for Ahrbach. Despite having played in the semifinals of the championship in 1995, Ahrbach won just one game two years later in the 1996–97 season, leading to relegation for the club. Ahrbach then remained at the Regionalliga Südwest until the end of the 2009–10 season. Having failed to qualify for the 2. Bundesliga at its inception in 2004, the club was relegated from the now third-level Regionalliga. However, promotion back to the Regionalliga was achieved at the end of the 2011–12 season.

After a number of relegations the team now plays in the tier five Bezirksliga.

== Notable players ==
The players below all collected caps for the women's national team while playing at Ahrbach.

- (Germany) Bettina Berens
- (Germany) Christine Francke
- (Germany) Marion Isbert
- (Germany) Melanie Lasrich
- (Germany) Ursula Lohn
- (Germany) Heidi Mohr
- (Germany) Jutta Nardenbach

== Statistics ==
Season	League	Place	W	D	L	GF	GA	Pts	DFB-Pokal
1990–91	Verbandsliga Rheinland (II)	1	unknown						1st round
1991–92	Bundesliga Süd (I)	7	5	6	9	21	24	16	3rd round
1992–93	Bundesliga Süd	6	7	3	8	30	40	17	3rd round
1993–94	Bundesliga Süd	6	7	3	8	36	34	17	Quarter-final
1994–95	Bundesliga Süd	2	13	1	4	69	21	27	3rd round
1995–96	Bundesliga Süd	5	6	5	7	22	31	23	3rd round
1996–97	Bundesliga Süd	10	1	4	13	16	55	7	2nd round
1997–98	Oberliga Südwest (II)	1	20	0	0	93	6	60	not qualified
1998–99	Oberliga Südwest	1	15	4	3	82	14	49	1st round
1999–00	Oberliga Südwest	2	19	3	2	77	24	60	1st round ^{*}
2000–01	Oberliga Südwest	4	13	2	7	45	25	41	not qualified
2001–02	Regionalliga Südwest (II)	5	9	7	6	49	42	34	not qualified
2002–03	Regionalliga Südwest	8	6	4	10	41	45	22	not qualified
2003–04	Regionalliga Südwest	4	11	3	8	71	51	36	1st round
2004–05	Regionalliga Südwest (III)	9	5	4	11	39	52	19	not qualified
2005–06	Regionalliga Südwest	4	14	1	7	62	34	43	not qualified
2006–07	Regionalliga Südwest	4	13	1	6	79	31	40	1st round
2007–08	Regionalliga Südwest	4	12	3	7	60	43	39	1st round
2008–09	Regionalliga Südwest	5	10	5	7	58	35	35	not qualified
2009–10	Regionalliga Südwest	11	5	2	17	45	84	17	1st round
2010–11	Rheinlandliga (IV)	4	12	4	6	55	36	40	not qualified
2011–12	Rheinlandliga	1	17	0	1	100	5	51	not qualified
2012–13	Regionalliga Südwest (III)								TBD
Green marks a season followed by promotion, red a season followed by relegation.

^{*} Ahrbach withdrew their team from the 1999–2000 cup.
