= Frauen-Bundesliga =

Top German women's football league

- Founded: 1990
- Country: Germany
- Confederation: UEFA
- Number of clubs: 14
- Level on pyramid: 1
- Relegation to: 2. Frauen-Bundesliga
- Domestic cup(s): DFB-Pokal; DFB-Supercup Frauen
- International cup: Champions League
- Current champions: Bayern Munich (7th title) (2025–26)
- Most championships: Bayern Munich; Eintracht Frankfurt; VfL Wolfsburg (7 titles each)
- Broadcasters: DAZN; Magenta Sport
- Website: dfb.de/frauen-bundesliga
- Current: 2026–27 Frauen-Bundesliga

The Frauen-Bundesliga (lit. 'Women's Federal League' in German), also known as the Google Pixel Frauen-Bundesliga for sponsorship reasons, is the top level of league competition for women's association football in Germany.

In the UEFA Women's Champions League, the Frauen-Bundesliga is the most successful league with a total of nine titles from four clubs.

In 1990 the German Football Association (DFB) created the German Women's Bundesliga, based on the model of the men's Bundesliga. It was first played with north and south divisions, but in 1997 the groups were merged to form a uniform league. The league currently consists of fourteen teams and the seasons usually last from late summer to the end of spring with a break in the winter. Despite the league's competitiveness, it has been semi-professional. VfL Wolfsburg has won the most championships. Although the league has become more professional, women's-only teams have found it difficult to support themselves without corporate financial backing.

== History ==
=== Background ===
Between 1974 and 1990, the German Football Association (DFB) organized the German women's football championship 17 times. The last edition of this championship format took place in 1990, featuring 16 teams that had qualified as the best teams from their respective regional associations.

Discussions regarding the introduction of a supra-regional league began in the mid-1980s, primarily due to significant performance disparities between the top teams and the rest of the clubs in the highest regional leagues. Cross-association leagues were established in West and North Germany in 1985 and 1986, respectively, while other regional associations maintained leagues at the local level. A nationwide league was proposed to balance the level of competition. At the 1986 DFB congress in Bremen, delegates voted almost unanimously to prepare for such a league; however, it was not immediately implemented. Following the national team's victory at the 1989 European Championship hosted in West Germany, the 1989 DFB congress in Trier officially approved the creation of a two-division Bundesliga for the 1990–91 season.

The newly established Bundesliga consisted of a North and a South division, each with ten clubs. In the initial application round, 35 clubs applied for the league. To allocate the 20 available spots, a points system based on recent sporting success was developed, similar to the process used for the introduction of the men's Bundesliga. Ultimately, the highest-ranked team from each of the 16 DFB member associations at the end of the 1989–90 season qualified automatically. The remaining four spots were determined through a playoff among the second-best teams from the regional associations.

=== Two-division league (1990–1997) ===
The North division was initially led by TSV Siegen, which won the first four division titles and three national championships during this period. Conversely, 1. FC Neukölln from Berlin lost all 18 league matches in the inaugural season. In the South division, FSV Frankfurt and TuS Niederkirchen were the most successful clubs. TuS Niederkirchen's performance declined after striker Heidi Mohr transferred to TuS Ahrbach in 1994. Following German reunification, USV Jena and FC Wismut Aue from the new states joined the league in 1991. The Bundesliga was temporarily expanded to two groups of 11 teams for one season. USV Jena was relegated at the end of the season, and FC Wismut Aue withdrew its team due to financial constraints.

During the early years of the Bundesliga, several pioneer clubs were replaced by newly promoted teams. In 1994, the 1985 champion KBC Duisburg and the record champion SSG Bergisch Gladbach were relegated, while clubs such as FC Rumeln-Kaldenhausen and Grün-Weiß Brauweiler established themselves in the upper half of the table. In the South division, FSV Frankfurt maintained a leading position, winning all of their matches in 1995 with the exception of one semi-final leg against Rumeln-Kaldenhausen.

=== Single-division Bundesliga (1997–present) ===
For the 1997–98 season, the Bundesliga was consolidated into a single division of 12 teams to address ongoing performance gaps. The top four teams from both the North and South divisions automatically qualified. The teams finishing fifth through eighth, along with eight teams from the respective second divisions, formed four groups of four. The four group winners also qualified for the single-division Bundesliga. Although Fortuna Sachsenross Hannover qualified athletically, the club withdrew due to financial reasons, and Hamburger SV took their place.

FSV Frankfurt won the first championship of the single-division Bundesliga, but the club's performance subsequently declined. After dropping to the middle of the table, the entire first-team squad left the club in the summer of 2005. In the following season, the team lost all but one match, often by wide margins, and the club dissolved its women's football department at the end of the 2005–06 season. Former champion TSV Siegen also experienced a decline in performance and eventually withdrew to the Regionalliga West in 2001.

SG Praunheim (later 1. FFC Frankfurt) capitalized on FSV Frankfurt's decline by signing several of their players, including Birgit Prinz. Between 1999 and 2008, the club won seven championships. Following FSV Frankfurt's relegation, 1. FFC Frankfurt became the only founding member to have never been relegated from the Bundesliga.

Since the late 1990s, former East German champion 1. FFC Turbine Potsdam secured a top position in the Bundesliga, winning multiple championships in the 2000s. Based on national and international titles, Potsdam remains the most successful women's football team from the new states.

Alongside 1. FFC Frankfurt and 1. FFC Turbine Potsdam, FC Rumeln-Kaldenhausen (later FCR 2001 Duisburg) consistently finished near the top of the table. In the 2000s, these three clubs dominated the top three positions in the league standings. FFC Heike Rheine secured third place in the 2003–04 season, and FC Bayern Munich achieved a second-place finish in the 2008–09 season. In more recent years, the league has been dominated by VfL Wolfsburg and FC Bayern Munich, who have won all league titles since 2013. The 2013–14 season set a league record for attendance, with an average of 1,185 spectators per match. In April 2014, the DFB secured the insurance company Allianz as a naming sponsor. Consequently, the league was officially named the Allianz Frauen-Bundesliga for five years, starting from 1 July 2014. The sponsorship agreement provided each club with a fixed sum of €100,000 per season.

For the 2019–20 season, the Bundesliga acquired a new naming sponsor, the Würzburg-based online printing company Flyeralarm, with a contract running until 2023. Starting 1 July 2023, Google secured the naming rights for their product Google Pixel until 2027, officially rebranding the league as the Google Pixel Frauen-Bundesliga.

In June 2024, the German Football Association decided to expand the Frauen-Bundesliga from 12 to 14 teams, starting with the 2025–26 season.

== Competition format ==
The Bundesliga consists of fourteen teams. At the end of a season, the club in the top spot is the champion, gaining the title of Deutscher Meister, and the clubs finishing 13th and 14th are replaced with the respective top-placed teams of the two 2. Frauen-Bundesliga divisions. A Bundesliga season consists of two rounds, with 26 games combined. In a round every club plays against each other, having a home game against a specific club in one round and an away game in the other. The seasons typically start in August or September, with the first round finishing in December. The second round typically starts in February and ends in May or June, though sometimes the first games of the second round are held in December. In World Cup years, the league might alter its schedule to accommodate the tournament.

The Bundesliga ranking is determined by points a club has gained during a season. A win is worth 3 points, a draw 1, and a loss 0. The tiebreakers are in descending order goal difference, goals for, and head-to-head results. If the tie in the league table cannot be broken, a tie-breaking game is held.

In June 2024, the DFB announced that from the 2025–26 season on, it will be played with 14 teams.

== Clubs ==
=== 2026–27 season ===
Locations of teams in the 2026–27 Frauen-Bundesliga

Team	Home city	Home ground	Capacity
Union Berlin	Berlin	Stadion An der Alten Försterei	22,012
Werder Bremen	Bremen	Weserstadion Platz 11	5,500
Eintracht Frankfurt	Frankfurt	Stadion am Brentanobad	5,650
SC Freiburg	Freiburg	Dreisamstadion	24,000
Hamburger SV	Hamburg	Volksparkstadion	57,000
TSG Hoffenheim	Hoffenheim	Dietmar-Hopp-Stadion	6,350
1. FC Köln	Cologne	Franz-Kremer-Stadion	5,457
RB Leipzig	Leipzig	Sportanlage Gontardweg	1,300
Bayer Leverkusen	Leverkusen	Ulrich-Haberland-Stadion	3,200
Mainz 05	Mainz	Bruchwegstadion	7,134
Bayern Munich	Munich	FC Bayern Campus	2,500
1. FC Nürnberg	Nuremberg	Max-Morlock-Stadion	50,000
VfB Stuttgart	Stuttgart	Stadion Hafenbahnstraße	2,000
VfL Wolfsburg	Wolfsburg	AOK Stadion	5,200

=== Champions ===
Season	Champions	Runners-up
1990–91	TSV Siegen	FSV Frankfurt
1991–92	TSV Siegen	Grün-Weiß Brauweiler
1992–93	TuS Niederkirchen	TSV Siegen
1993–94	TSV Siegen	Grün-Weiß Brauweiler
1994–95	FSV Frankfurt	Grün-Weiß Brauweiler
1995–96	TSV Siegen	SG Praunheim
1996–97	Grün-Weiß Brauweiler	FC Rumeln-Kaldenhausen
1997–98	FSV Frankfurt	SG Praunheim
1998–99	1. FFC Frankfurt	FCR Duisburg
1999–00	FCR Duisburg	1. FFC Frankfurt
2000–01	1. FFC Frankfurt	1. FFC Turbine Potsdam
2001–02	1. FFC Frankfurt	1. FFC Turbine Potsdam
2002–03	1. FFC Frankfurt	1. FFC Turbine Potsdam
2003–04	1. FFC Turbine Potsdam	1. FFC Frankfurt
2004–05	1. FFC Frankfurt	FCR Duisburg
2005–06	1. FFC Turbine Potsdam	FCR Duisburg
2006–07	1. FFC Frankfurt	FCR Duisburg
2007–08	1. FFC Frankfurt	FCR Duisburg
2008–09	1. FFC Turbine Potsdam	Bayern Munich
2009–10	1. FFC Turbine Potsdam	FCR Duisburg
2010–11	1. FFC Turbine Potsdam	1. FFC Frankfurt
2011–12	1. FFC Turbine Potsdam	VfL Wolfsburg
2012–13	VfL Wolfsburg	1. FFC Turbine Potsdam
2013–14	VfL Wolfsburg	1. FFC Frankfurt
2014–15	Bayern Munich	VfL Wolfsburg
2015–16	Bayern Munich	VfL Wolfsburg
2016–17	VfL Wolfsburg	Bayern Munich
2017–18	VfL Wolfsburg	Bayern Munich
2018–19	VfL Wolfsburg	Bayern Munich
2019–20	VfL Wolfsburg	Bayern Munich
2020–21	Bayern Munich	VfL Wolfsburg
2021–22	VfL Wolfsburg	Bayern Munich
2022–23	Bayern Munich	VfL Wolfsburg
2023–24	Bayern Munich	VfL Wolfsburg
2024–25	Bayern Munich	VfL Wolfsburg
2025–26	Bayern Munich	VfL Wolfsburg

==== Wins by club ====
Club	Titles	Runners-up
VfL Wolfsburg	7	8
Eintracht Frankfurt	7 (Note: Seven title finishes as 1. FFC Frankfurt.)	6 (Note: Two runner-up finishes as SG Praunheim, and four runner-up finishes as 1. FFC Frankfurt.)
Bayern Munich	7	6
1. FFC Turbine Potsdam	6	4
TSV Siegen	4	1
FSV Frankfurt	2	1
FCR Duisburg	1	7 (Note: One runner-up finish as FC Rumeln-Kaldenhausen.)
Grün-Weiß Brauweiler	1	3
TuS Niederkirchen	1	0

== International competitions ==
Each season's champion as well as the second-place finisher qualifies for the next season's UEFA Women's Champions League.

Starting with the 2021–22 edition, as determined by the UEFA women's coefficient, the top three teams will qualify for the UEFA Women's Champions League.

== Broadcasting ==
=== 2023–24 until 2026–27 ===
Country/Region	Broadcaster
Germany	Magenta Sport,
Germany	ARD,
Germany	ZDF
Germany	Sport1
Baltics	Viaplay Group
Netherlands	Viaplay Group
Nordics	Viaplay Group
Poland	Viaplay Group
Brazil	DAZN
Canada	DAZN
Europe^{EUR}	DAZN
Japan	DAZN
Central America	Sky Sports
Dominican Republic	Sky Sports
Mexico	Sky Sports
India	DD Sports
Worldwide (unsold markets)	W-Sport
Worldwide (unsold markets)	DFB Play

EUR - Frauen-Bundesliga on DAZN coverage is not available in Denmark, Estonia, Finland, Iceland, Latvia, Lithuania, the Netherlands, Norway, Poland, and Sweden

== See also ==
- List of German women's football champions
- DFB-Pokal (women)
- Women's sports
- List of foreign Frauen-Bundesliga players
