= FFC Brauweiler Pulheim =

FFC Brauweiler
- Full name: Frauenfußballclub Brauweiler Pulheim 2000 e.V.
- Founded: 1 June 2000
- Ground: Sportzentrum Pulheim, Pulheim
- Capacity: 2,200
- League: Defunct
- Dissolved: 30 June 2009
Home colours	Away colours

FFC Brauweiler Pulheim 2000 was a German women's football club based in Pulheim, North Rhine-Westphalia. It was founded when the women's section of Grün-Weiß Brauweiler in 2000 established its own club. The team played its last season in the Regionalliga, the German third division. Afterwards the club disbanded to join 1. FC Köln.

== History ==
In 1974 Thomas Meyer established a training group which became the women's section of Grün-Weiß Brauweiler. The team played in the top division from the beginning on and relegations in 1980 and 1986 were followed by direct re-promotions. Despite three consecutive wins of the regional Mittelrheinpokal in 1989-91 Brauweiler did not qualify for the Bundesliga at its inception in 1990. The following season marked one of the club's greatest successes as promotion to the Bundesliga was achieved. Brauweiler won the cup in the same season, being still the only time a club from the second division was able to achieve this feat. The club fought its way to the Bundesliga final, there losing to TSV Siegen. After winning another cup in 1993 and several second places in the league Brauweiler won its first and only championship in 1997. A week later the club's third cup win completed the Double.

With a fourth place in 1997–98 Brauweiler qualified for the single-railed Bundesliga, but several seasons of mediocre performance followed. Eventually the team was relegated to the 2nd league in 2003–04. A direct re-promotion was followed by a year of constant fighting against being relegated yet again. The retirement of several core players led to a disastrous 2006–07 season where Brauweiler took loss after loss, resulting in relegation without having won a single point. The second consecutive relegation followed right away in a season that also brought financial turmoil for Brauweiler, leaving the team to play in the third division for the first time. In 2008–09 Brauweiler won the championship in the Regionalliga thus qualifying for the 2nd league once again. The club disbanded before the 2009–10 season to join 1. FC Köln, though.

== Honours ==
- German football champions: 1997
- Regionalliga champions: 2009
- DFB-Pokal: 1991, 1994, 1997
- Super-Cup: 1994, 1997

== Notable past players ==
- (Germany) Sonja Fuss
- (Germany) Maren Meinert
- (Germany) Silke Rottenberg
- (Germany) Tina Theune-Meyer
- (Germany) Bettina Wiegmann
- (Puerto Rico) Esmeralda Negron
- (Denmark) Karina Sefron

== Statistics ==
Season	League	Place	W	D	L	GF	GA	Pts	DFB-Cup
1989–90	Regionalliga West (II)	4	11	6	5	51	17	28	Semifinal
1990–91	Regionalliga West (II)	1	18	2	0	62	11	38	Won
1991–92	Bundesliga Nord (I)	RU (1)	13	4	3	51	13	30	Semifinal
1992–93	Bundesliga Nord	SF (2)	12	4	2	45	10	28	Runner-up
1993–94	Bundesliga Nord	RU (2)	14	3	1	66	9	31	Won
1994–95	Bundesliga Nord	RU (1)	17	0	1	77	9	34	Semifinal
1995–96	Bundesliga Nord	SF (1)	15	1	2	60	17	48	Quarterfinal
1996–97	Bundesliga Nord	Won (1)	15	2	1	59	12	47	Won
1997–98	Bundesliga	4	12	3	7	35	28	39	3rd round
1998–99	Bundesliga	9	6	5	11	29	51	23	3rd round
1999–00	Bundesliga	5	11	6	5	50	30	39	Semifinal
2000–01	Bundesliga	4	12	1	9	56	32	37	Quarterfinal
2001–02	Bundesliga	7	10	3	9	37	27	33	Quarterfinal
2002–03	Bundesliga	6	9	4	9	41	27	31	Semifinal
2003–04	Bundesliga	11	3	6	13	30	57	15	Semifinal
2004–05	2. Bundesliga Nord (II)	1	18	2	2	95	25	56	3rd round
2005–06	Bundesliga	10	3	4	15	24	79	13	3rd round
2006–07	Bundesliga	12	0	0	22	15	100	0	2nd round
2007–08	2. Bundesliga Süd	12	3	5	14	25	64	14	1st round
2008–09	Regionalliga West (III)	1	20	2	4	64	25	62	1st round
Green marks a season followed by promotion, red a season followed by relegation.
