= SC Klinge Seckach =

Klinge Seckach
- Full name: Sportclub Klinge Seckach 1981 e.V.
- Founded: 28 June 1981
- Chairman: Hubert Lang
- Head Coach: Horst Haselmann
- League: Verbandsliga Baden
- 2015–16: 8th

SC Klinge Seckach is a German women's football club based in Seckach, Baden-Württemberg. The women's club has played eight seasons in the Bundesliga, but at the end of the 1990s their performance fell off and today Klinge Seckach's first team plays in the fifth-tier Verbandsliga.

== History ==
The origins of Klinge Seckach lie at SV Schlierstadt. Schlierstadt won the championship of Baden in 1975 and again in 1977. Following the 1977 championship they had even reached the semi-final of the German championship where they lost to FC Oberst Schiel 1902 Niederrad. The club won consecutive championships from 1979 to 1981, but was never able to advance beyond the second round of the national championship. Also in 1981 the DFB-Pokal was held for the first time and Schlierstadt reached the quarter-final of the competition.

In 1981 the ladies of Schlierstadt decided to form their own club and on 28 June 1981 SC Klinge Seckach was founded as an independent women's football club. While the club resides in Seckach the "Klinge" part of the name refers to initial ground of the club which was in the Klinge district of Seckach. Klinge Seckach continued to have success a and reached the semi-final of the national championship again in 1982 where they lost to eventual champions SSG Bergisch Gladbach. In the following seasons Klinge Seckach established themselves as a club participating routinely in national tournaments, failing to qualify for the cup and the championship only in 1987. In 1983 they had their most successful season, reaching the quarter-final of the championship and the semi-final of the cup.

When the Bundesliga was incepted in 1990 Klinge Seckach was among the twenty teams eligible. In 1996 they reached the final of the DFB-Pokal, losing 1–2 to 1. FFC Frankfurt. Having achieved mid-table results for seven consecutive seasons the club's performance declined steeply afterwards leading to two consecutive relegations in 1998 and 1999. Klinge Seckach managed promotion back to second-tier football in 2001, but another relegation in 2006 and the introduction of two new levels further up in the pyramid steadily moved the club to fifth-tier football.

== Notable past players ==
The following players of Klinge Seckach had appearances in the Germany women's national team:

- (Germany) Petra Bartelmann
- (Germany) Renate Lingor
- (Germany) Silvia Neid

== Honours ==
As of 23 July 2009

- DFB-Pokal runners-up: 1996
- Member of the Bundesliga (8 seasons): 1990–1998
- Regional champion of Baden: (6x) 1982, 1983, 1985, 1986, 1989, 1990
- Winner of the cup of Baden: (6x) 1983, 1984, 1985, 1987, 1989, 1990

In addition the team won the following honours while still being a part of SV Schlierstadt:

- Regional champion of Baden: (7x) 1975, 1976, 1977, 1978, 1979, 1980, 1981
- Winner of the cup of Baden: (1x) 1980
