= 2024–25 Korona Kielce season =

Korona Kielce
2024–25 season
- Manager: Kamil Kuzera (until 31 July); Mariusz Arczewski (caretaker, 31 July–7 August); Jacek Zieliński (from 7 August)
- Stadium: Kielce Stadium
- Ekstraklasa: 15th
- Polish Cup: Round of 32
- Average home league attendance: 11,139
- Biggest defeat: Pogoń Szczecin 3–0 Korona Kielce
| Home colours | Away colours | Third colours |

The 2024–25 season is the 52nd season in the history of Korona Kielce, and the club's third consecutive season in Ekstraklasa. In addition to the domestic league, the team is scheduled to participate in the Polish Cup.

== Transfers ==
=== In ===
| Pos. | Player | Transferred from | Fee | Date | Source |
|---|---|---|---|---|---|
| FW | (Poland) Jakub Górski | (Poland) Stal Stalowa Wola | Loan return | 30 June 2024 | |
| MF | (Poland) Konrad Matuszewski | (Poland) Warta Poznań | Free | 1 July 2024 | |
| MF | (Japan) Shuma Nagamatsu | (Poland) Znicz Pruszków | Free | 1 July 2024 | |
| MF | (Portugal) Pedro Nuno | (Azerbaijan) Sabail FK | Undisclosed | 6 July 2024 | |
| DF | (Poland) Bartłomiej Smolarczyk | (Netherlands) FC Dordrecht | Undisclosed | 24 July 2024 | |

=== Out ===
| Pos. | Player | Transferred to | Fee | Date | Source |
|---|---|---|---|---|---|
| GK | (Poland) Xavier Dziekoński | (Poland) Raków Częstochowa | Loan return | 30 June 2024 | |
| GK | (Poland) Konrad Forenc | (Poland) Podbeskidzie Bielsko-Biała | End of contract | 1 July 2024 | |
| MF | (Ukraine) Kyrylo Petrov | | End of contract | 1 July 2024 | |
| MF | (Norway) Fredrik Krogstad | (Denmark) Hvidovre | End of contract | 1 July 2024 | |
| MF | (Slovakia) Dalibor Takáč | (Slovakia) FC Košice | End of contract | 1 July 2024 | |
| MF | (Finland) Petteri Forsell | (Turkey) Şanlıurfaspor | End of contract | 1 July 2024 | |
| MF | (Poland) Jacek Podgórski | (Poland) Miedź Legnica | End of contract | 1 July 2024 | |
| DF | (Romania) Marius Briceag | (Romania) Argeș Pitești | End of contract | 1 July 2024 | |
| MF | (Poland) Jakub Łukowski | (Poland) Widzew Łódź | End of contract | 1 July 2024 | |
| DF | (Poland) Bartosz Kwiecień | (Poland) Miedź Legnica | End of contract | 1 July 2024 | |
| MF | (Poland) Radosław Turek | | End of contract | 1 July 2024 | |
| FW | (Poland) Jakub Górski | (Poland) Stal Stalowa Wola | Free | 12 July 2024 | |
| MF | (Poland) Mateusz Czyżycki | | Contract terminated | 3 January 2025 | |

== Friendlies ==
=== Pre-season ===
| 22 June 2024 Friendly | Korona Kielce (Poland) | 1–1 | (Poland) Motor Lublin | Niepołomice |
| 14:00 | Sewerzyński 87' | | Ndiaye 39' | Stadium: Stadion ul. Kusocińskiego |

| 26 June 2024 Friendly | Radomiak Radom (Poland) | 3–0 | (Poland) Korona Kielce | Radom |
| 12:00 | Wolski 17'; Grzesik 27'; Sokół 64' | | | Stadium: Centrum Sportowo-Szkoleniowe Radomiak |

| 29 June 2024 Friendly | Korona Kielce (Poland) | 4–1 | (Poland) Ruch Chorzów | Kielce |
| 11:45 | Błanik 32'; Shikavka 71'; Konstantyn 76', 81' | | Szur 25' | Stadium: Kielce Stadium |

| 6 July 2024 Friendly | Korona Kielce (Poland) | 6–1 | (Poland) Górnik Łęczna | Kielce |
| 11:00 | Shikavka 36'; Strzeboński 41'; Dalmau 67', 100', 113'; Bąk 84' | | Spacil 6' | Stadium: Kielce Stadium |
Note: Two periods of 60 minutes

| 13 July 2024 Friendly | Piast Gliwice (Poland) | 3–0 | (Poland) Korona Kielce | Gliwice |
| 17:00 | Ameyaw 77'; Pięczek 90' (o.g.); Piasecki 110' (pen.) | | | Stadium: Piotr Wieczorek Stadium |
Note: Three periods of 45 minutes

=== Mid-season ===
| 14 January 2025 Friendly | Korona Kielce (Poland) | 0–0 | (Hungary) Nyíregyháza |
| 13:00 |

| 18 January 2025 Friendly | Korona Kielce (Poland) | 0–0 | (South Korea) Gangwon FC |
| 13:00 |

| 24 January 2025 Friendly | Korona Kielce (Poland) | 0–1 | (North Macedonia) FC Struga |
| 11:00 |

== Competitions ==
=== Overall record ===
| Competition | First match | Last match | Starting round | Record | | | | | | | |
| Competition | First match | Last match | Starting round | Pld | W | D | L | GF | GA | GD | Win % |
|---|---|---|---|---|---|---|---|---|---|---|---|
| Ekstraklasa | 20 July 2024 | 24–25 May 2025 | Matchday 1 | 10 | 2 | 3 | 5 | 8 | 16 | −8 | 20.00 |
| Polish Cup | 25 September 2024 | | | 1 | 0 | 1 | 0 | 1 | 1 | +0 | 0.00 |
| Total | | | | 11 | 2 | 4 | 5 | 9 | 17 | −8 | 18.18 |

Last updated: 29 September 2024
Source: Soccerway

=== Ekstraklasa ===
==== League table ====
| Pos | Team | Pld | W | D | L | GF | GA | GD | Pts |
|---|---|---|---|---|---|---|---|---|---|
| 9 | Górnik Zabrze | 34 | 13 | 8 | 13 | 43 | 39 | +4 | 47 |
| 10 | Piast Gliwice | 34 | 11 | 12 | 11 | 37 | 36 | +1 | 45 (Note: Ranked based on head-to-head points: Piast Gliwice 4 pts, Korona Kielce - 1 pt.) |
| 11 | Korona Kielce | 34 | 11 | 12 | 11 | 37 | 45 | −8 | 45 |
| 12 | Radomiak Radom | 34 | 11 | 8 | 15 | 48 | 52 | −4 | 41 |
| 13 | Widzew Łódź | 34 | 11 | 7 | 16 | 38 | 49 | −11 | 40 |

Source: ekstraklasa.org 90minut.pl
Rules for classification: 1) Points; 2) Head-to-head points; 3) Head-to-head goal difference; 4) Goal difference; 5) Goals scored; 6) Number of wins; 7) Number of away wins; 8) Lower number of points based on yellow and red cards (red card = 3 points, yellow card = 1 point, sending-off = 3 points - including 1 point for first yellow card); 9) Fairplay ranking; 10) Draw.
(Note: Head-to-head record is used only after all the matches between the teams in question have been played)

==== Results summary ====
| Overall | | | | | | | | Home | | | | | | Away | | | | | |
| Pld | W | D | L | GF | GA | GD | Pts | W | D | L | GF | GA | GD | W | D | L | GF | GA | GD |
|---|---|---|---|---|---|---|---|---|---|---|---|---|---|---|---|---|---|---|---|
| 4 | 0 | 1 | 3 | 1 | 7 | −6 | 1 | 0 | 0 | 2 | 0 | 3 | −3 | 0 | 1 | 1 | 1 | 4 | −3 |

Last updated: 10 August 2024.

==== Results by round ====
| Round | 1 | 2 | 3 | 4 |
|---|---|---|---|---|
| Ground | A | H | A | H |
| Result | L | L | D | L |
| Position | 18 | 18 | 18 | 18 |

Updated to match(es) played on 10 August 2024. Source:
A = Away; H = Home; W = Win; D = Draw; L = Loss

==== Matches ====
| 20 July 2024 1 | Pogoń Szczecin | 3–0 | Korona Kielce | Szczecin |
| 17:30 | Ulvestad (yellow card) 9'; Koulouris 35', 47' (pen.); Łukasiak 84' | | Zwoźny (yellow card) 9'; Strzeboński (yellow card) 33'; Fornalczyk (yellow card) 70' | Stadium: Florian Krygier Stadium; Attendance: 18,743; Referee: Marcin Szczerbowicz |

| 28 July 2024 2 | Korona Kielce | 0–1 | Legia Warsaw | Kielce |
| 20:15 | Trojak (yellow card) 22'; Fornalczyk (yellow card) 41' | | Gonçalves (yellow card) 34'; Wszołek (yellow card) 41'; Ziółkowski (yellow card) 60'; Luquinhas 74' | Stadium: Kielce Stadium; Referee: Karol Arys |

| 4 August 2024 3 | Motor Lublin | 1–1 | Korona Kielce | Lublin |
| 14:45 | Ceglarz 82' (pen.) | | Dalmau 43' | Stadium: Arena Lublin; Referee: Marcin Kochanek |

| 10 August 2024 4 | Korona Kielce | 0–2 | Cracovia | Kielce |
| 17:30 | Fornalczyk (yellow card) 50'; Kośmicki (yellow card) 62'; Matuszewski (yellow card) 66'; Shikavka (penalty missed) 89' | | Ghiță (yellow card) 9', (goal) 37'; Maigaard (yellow card) 55'; Van Buren 59'; Kakabadze (yellow card) 74'; Glik (yellow card) 82' | Stadium: Kielce Stadium; Attendance: 11,931; Referee: Wojciech Myć |

| 18 August 2024 5 | Śląsk Wrocław | 1–1 | Korona Kielce | Wrocław |
| 14:45 | | | | Stadium: Wrocław Stadium |

| 26 August 2024 6 | Korona Kielce | 2–1 | Stal Mielec | Kielce |
| 19:00 | | | | Stadium: Kielce Stadium |

| 31 August 2024 7 | Puszcza Niepołomice | 0–0 | Korona Kielce | Kraków |
| 18:00 | | | | Stadium: Józef Piłsudski Cracovia Stadium |

| 15 September 2024 8 | Korona Kielce | 2–0 | Zagłębie Lubin | Kielce |
| 14:45 | | | | Stadium: Kielce Stadium |

| 20 September 2024 9 | Radomiak Radom | 4–0 | Korona Kielce | Radom |
| 18:00 | | | | Stadium: Czachor Brothers Stadium |

| 29 September 2024 10 | Korona Kielce | 2–3 | Lech Poznań | Kielce |
| 14:45 | | | | Stadium: Kielce Stadium |

| 4 October 2024 11 | Widzew Łódź | v | Korona Kielce | Łódź |
| 20:30 | | | | Stadium: Widzew Łódź Stadium |

=== Polish Cup ===
| 25 September 2024 First round | Korona Kielce | 1–1 (a.e.t.) (4–3 p) | Stal Mielec | Kielce |
| 17:30 UTC+2 | | | | Stadium: Kielce Stadium |
