= CWKS Resovia =

CWKS Resovia, Resovia, and Resovia Rzeszów can refer to:

- Resovia (multisport club)
- Resovia (basketball)
- Resovia (football)
- Resovia (volleyball)
