= 1989–90 DFB-Pokal Frauen =

Tournament details
- Country: Germany
- Teams: 16

Final positions
- Champions: FSV Frankfurt
- Runners-up: Bayern Munich

Tournament statistics
- Matches played: 17
- Goals scored: 72 (4.24 per match)

The Frauen DFB-Pokal 1989–90 was the 10th season of the cup competition, Germany's second-most important title in women's football. In the final which was held in Berlin on 19 May 1990 FSV Frankfurt defeated Bayern Munich 1–0, thus claiming their second cup title.

== Participants ==
| Northern region | Western region | Southwestern region | Southern region | Berlin |
| Bremen: Polizei SV Bremen; Hamburg: SC Poppenbüttel; Lower Saxony: VfR Eintracht Wolfsburg; Schleswig-Holstein: Schmalfelder SV | Middle Rhine: Grün-Weiß Brauweiler; Lower Rhine: KBC Duisburg; Westphalia: TSV Siegen | Rhineland: TuS Ahrbach; Saarland: VfR 09 Saarbrücken; Southwest: TuS Wörrstadt | Baden Klinge Seckach; Bavaria Bayern Munich; Hesse: FSV Frankfurt; South Baden: SpVgg Wiehre; Württemberg: VfL Sindelfingen | Berlin: 1. FC Neukölln |

== First round ==
| VfR 09 Saarbrücken | 3 – 0 | TuS Wörrstadt |
| TuS Ahrbach | 1 – 2 | Grün-Weiß Brauweiler |
| VfR Eintracht Wolfsburg | 1 – 3 | VfL Sindelfingen |
| SpVgg Wiehre | 6 – 2 | 1. FC Neukölln Berlin |
| KBC Duisburg | 3 – 5 | FSV Frankfurt |
| SC Poppenbüttel | 0 – 3 | Schmalfelder SV |
| Klinge Seckach | 6 – 0 | Polizei SV Bremen |
| Bayern Munich | 1 – 1 | TSV Siegen | (aet) |

=== Replay ===
| TSV Siegen | 1 – 1 | Bayern Munich | (aet, 3–5 on penalties) |

== Quarter-finals ==
| Schmalfelder SV | 0 – 2 | VfR 09 Saarbrücken |
| FSV Frankfurt | 10 – 0 | SpVgg Wiehre |
| Klinge Seckach | 1 – 2 | Bayern Munich |
| VfL Sindelfingen | 0 – 1 | Grün-Weiß Brauweiler |

== Semi-finals ==
| VfR 09 Saarbrücken | 1 – 1 | FSV Frankfurt | (aet) |
| Grün-Weiß Brauweiler | 0 – 1 | Bayern Munich |

=== Replay ===
| FSV Frankfurt | 3 – 2 | VfR 09 Saarbrücken | (aet) |

== Final ==
19 May 1990

| FSV Frankfurt | 1 – 0 | Bayern Munich |
|---|---|---|
| Walter 20' |

Olympic Stadium (Berlin)
Attendance: 15,000
Referee: Hellmut Krug (Gelsenkirchen)

FSV FRANKFURT:
GK | 1 | (United States) Mary Harvey
DF | (Germany) Andrea Heinrich
DF | (Germany) Daniela Stumpf
DF | (Germany) Britta Unsleber
DF | (Germany) Kerstin Pohlmann
MF | (Germany) Gaby König
MF | (Germany) Bettina Mantel
MF | (Germany) Dagmar Pohlmann
MF | (Germany) Katja Bornschein
FW | (Germany) Martina Walter | (substituted off) 71'
FW | (Germany) Gaby Mink | (substituted off) 71'
Substitutes:
MF | (Germany) Carmen Birkenbach | (substituted on) 71'
FW | (Germany) Susanne Rotard | (substituted on) 71'
Manager:
(Germany) Monika Koch-Emsermann

FC BAYERN MÜNCHEN:
| GK | 1 | (Germany) Natalie Friedrich |
| DF | | (Germany) Dagmar Uebelhör |
| DF | | (Germany) Christine Paul |
| DF | | Oljknik |
| MF | | (Germany) Roswitha Bindl |
| MF | | (Germany) Kristina Wiest | Booked |
| MF | | (Germany) Marion Steinbrunner |
| FW | | (Germany) Carola Walden | Booked | (substituted off) 70' |
| FW | | Grom |
| FW | | Rie Yamaki |
| ? | | ? |
Substitutes:
| | | Becker | | (substituted on) 70' |
Manager:
(Germany) Cornelia Doll
