= Krystian Prymula =

German-Polish footballer

Personal information
- Date of birth: 17 March 1983 (age 43)
- Place of birth: Świdnica, Poland
- Height: 1.85 m (6 ft 1 in)
- Position: Striker

Youth career
- BFC Preussen
- SpVg Blau-Weiß 90 Berlin
- Tennis Borussia Berlin

Senior career*
Years	Team	Apps	(Gls)
2001–2002	Berliner AK 07	16	(1)
2002	Chemnitzer FC	7	(2)
2002–2003	LR Ahlen	6	(0)
2003–2004	Chemnitzer FC	14	(2)
2004–2006	MSV Neuruppin	52	(14)
2006–2007	SV Yeşilyurt	11	(5)
2007–2008	Zagłębie Sosnowiec	17	(7)
2008	Resovia Rzeszów	10	(0)
2008–2009	Mariendorfer SV		
- * Club domestic league appearances and goals

Krystian Prymula (born 17 March 1983) is a German-Polish former professional footballer who played as a striker.
