= 1986–87 DFB-Pokal Frauen =

Tournament details
- Country: Germany
- Teams: 16

Final positions
- Champions: TSV Siegen
- Runners-up: STV Lövenich

Tournament statistics
- Matches played: 16
- Goals scored: 56 (3.5 per match)

The Frauen DFB-Pokal 1986–87 was the 7th season of the cup competition, Germany's second-most important title in women's football. In the final which was held in Berlin on 20 June 1987 TSV Siegen defeated STV Lövenich 5–2, thus winning their second cup in a row. It was their second cup title overall, too.

== Participants ==
Northern region	Western region	Southwestern region	Southern region	Berlin
Bremen: Polizei SV Bremen; Hamburg: FTSV Lorbeer Rothenburgsort; Lower Saxony: VfL Wittekind Wildeshausen; Schleswig-Holstein: Wittenseer SV	Middle Rhine: STV Lövenich; Lower Rhine: VfB Uerdingen; Westphalia: TSV Siegen	Rhineland: SC 07 Bad Neuenahr; Saarland: FSV Viktoria Jägersburg; Southwest: TuS Niederkirchen	Baden FC Spöck; Bavaria Bayern Munich; Hesse: FSV Frankfurt; South Baden: TuS Binzen; Württemberg: SV Oberteuringen	Berlin: Mariendorfer SV

== First round ==
FSV Frankfurt	7 – 0	SV Oberteuringen
SC 07 Bad Neuenahr	2 – 3	STV Lövenich	(aet)
Wittenseer SV	0 – 5	TSV Siegen
FC Spöck	0 – 1	TuS Binzen
FSV Viktoria Jägersburg	1 – 0	TuS Niederkirchen
Polizei SV Bremen	0 – 3	VfL Wittekind Wildeshausen
FTSV Lorbeer Rothenburgsort	2 – 1	Mariendorfer SV
VfB Uerdingen	1 – 1	Bayern Munich	(aet)

=== Replay ===
Bayern Munich	2 – 0	VfB Uerdingen

== Quarter-finals ==
VfL Wittekind Wildeshauen	0 – 3	FSV Frankfurt
FSV Viktoria Jägersburg	0 – 1	FTSV Lorbeer Rothenburgsort
STV Lövenich	4 – 1	TuS Binzen
Bayern Munich	0 – 4	TSV Siegen

== Semi-finals ==
TSV Siegen	2 – 1	FSV Frankfurt	(aet)
STV Lövenich	4 – 0	FTSV Lorbeer Rothenburgsort

== Final ==
20 June 1987

TSV Siegen	5 – 2	STV Lövenich
Neid 19'; Chaladyniak 24'; Hennecke 50' (pen.); Pick 65'; Bartelmann 71'		Schotten 47'; Czyganowski 67' (o.g.)

Olympic Stadium (Berlin)
Attendance: 30,000
Referee: Gerd Zimmermann (Kiel)

TSV SIEGEN:
GK	1	(Germany) Rosemarie Neuser
DF	(Germany) Manuela Kozany
DF	(Germany) Melitta Thomas
DF	(Germany) Iris Hennecke	(substituted off) 63'
MF	(Germany) Karin Sänger
DF	(Germany) Sissy Raith
MF	Heike Czyganowski
MF	(Germany) Rike Koekkoek
MF	(Germany) Silvia Neid
FW	(Germany) Christine Chaladyniak	(substituted off) 53'
FW	(Germany) Petra Bartelmann
Substitutes:
(Germany) Petra Hamm	(substituted on) 63'
(Germany) Thea Pick	(substituted on) 53'
Manager:
(Germany) Gerhard Neuser

STV LÖVENICH:
GK	1	(Germany) Gabi Wego
DF	(Germany) Elisabeth Jansen
DF	(Germany) Susanne Lupp
DF	(Germany) Marie-Luise Gehlen	Booked
MF	(Germany) Waltraud Lambertz
MF	(Germany) Margret Schüffler
MF	(Germany) Erika Marx	(substituted off) 72'
MF	(Germany) Dagmar Armbrust
MF	(Germany) Dagmar Ziege	(substituted off) 41'
FW	(Germany) Sanna Ammer
FW	(Germany) Dorothee Schotten
Substitutes:
(Germany) Martina Stepprath-Rauschen	(substituted on) 72'
(Germany) Karin Heyartz	(substituted on) 41'
Manager:
(Germany) Toni Zündorf

== See also ==
- 1986–87 DFB-Pokal men's competition
