= Jaroch =

Jaroch is a Polish surname. Notable people with the surname include:

- Bartosz Jaroch (born 1995), Polish footballer
- Gracjan Jaroch (born 1998), Polish footballer, cousin of Bartosz
