= 1987–88 DFB-Pokal Frauen =

Tournament details
- Country: Germany
- Teams: 16

Final positions
- Champions: TSV Siegen
- Runners-up: Bayern Munich

Tournament statistics
- Matches played: 15
- Goals scored: 52 (3.47 per match)

The Frauen DFB-Pokal 1987–88 was the 8th season of the cup competition, Germany's second-most important title in women's football. In the final, held in Berlin on 28 May 1988, TSV Siegen defeated Bayern Munich 4–1, thus winning their third cup in a row, as well as their third cup overall.

== Participants ==
Northern region	Western region	Southwestern region	Southern region	Berlin
Bremen: Polizei SV Bremen; Hamburg: Groß Flottbeker SpVgg; Lower Saxony: Fortuna Sachsenroß Hannover; Schleswig-Holstein: Husumer FV 1918	Middle Rhine: SSG Bergisch Gladbach; Lower Rhine: KBC Duisburg; Westphalia: TSV Siegen	Rhineland: SC 07 Bad Neuenahr; Saarland: FSV Viktoria Jägersburg; Southwest: TuS Wörrstadt	Baden Klinge Seckach; Bavaria Bayern Munich; Hesse: FSV Frankfurt; South Baden: TuS Binzen; Württemberg: VfL Sindelfingen	Berlin: Tennis Borussia Berlin

== First round ==
SC 07 Bad Neuenahr	2 – 3	Klinge Seckach
FV Husum 1918	0 – 6	FSV Viktoria Jägersburg
Fortuna Sachsenroß Hannover	1 – 5	FSV Frankfurt
TSV Siegen	6 – 0	Polizei SV Bremen
KBC Duisburg	4 – 0	TuS Binzen
SSG Bergisch Gladbach	2 – 0	TuS Wörrstadt
Groß Flottbeker SpVgg	0 – 1	VfL Sindelfingen
Tennis Borussia Berlin	0 – 3	Bayern Munich

== Quarter-finals ==
FSV Viktoria Jägersburg	0 – 4	Bayern Munich
TSV Siegen	3 – 1	KBC Duisburg	(aet)
FSV Frankfurt	1 – 0	VfL Sindelfingen
Klinge Seckach	0 – 1	SSG Bergisch Gladbach

== Semi-finals ==
TSV Siegen	4 – 0	FSV Frankfurt
Bayern Munich	1 – 0	SSG Bergisch Gladbach

== Final ==
18 May 1988

TSV Siegen	4 – 0	Bayern Munich
Neid 15' 34' 73'; Wiese 66' (pen.)

Olympic Stadium (Berlin)
Attendance: 30,000
Referee: Alfons Dellwing (Trier)

TSV SIEGEN:
GK	1	(Germany) Rosemarie Neuser
DF	(Germany) Manuela Kozany
DF	(Germany) Sissy Raith	Booked
DF	(Germany) Karin Sänger
MF	Heike Czyganowski
MF	(Germany) Melitta Thomas	(substituted off) 74'
MF	(Germany) Silvia Neid
MF	(Germany) Rike Koekkoek
MF	(Germany) Birgit Wiese
FW	(Germany) Beate Henkel
FW	(New Zealand) Michele Cox
Substitutes:
(Germany) Petra Hamm	(substituted on) 74'
Manager:
(Germany) Gerhard Neuser

FC BAYERN MÜNCHEN:
GK	1	(Germany) Natalie Friedrich
DF	(Germany) Marion Steinbrunner
DF	(Germany) Christine Paul
DF	(Germany) Dagmar Uebelhör	Booked
DF	(Germany) Petra Sandles
MF	(Germany) Volz	(substituted off) 58'
MF	(Germany) Kristina Wiest
MF	(Germany) Roswitha Bindl
MF	(Germany) Heel	(substituted off) 41'
FW	(Germany) Schmidt
FW	(Germany) Stefanie Brozulat
Substitutes:
(Germany) Herchenberger	(substituted on) 58'
Munoz Peres	(substituted on) 41'
Manager:
(Germany) Cornelia Doll

== See also ==
- 1987–88 DFB-Pokal men's competition
