= Szymon Szymański =

Szymon Szymański can refer to:

- Szymon Szymański (basketball) (born 1996), Polish basketball player
- Szymon Szymański (footballer) (born 1996), Polish football player
