= Damian Oko =

Polish footballer (born 1997)

Personal information
- Date of birth: 22 January 1997 (age 29)
- Place of birth: Bolesławiec, Poland
- Height: 1.90 m (6 ft 3 in)
- Position: Centre-back

Team information
- Current team: Resovia
- Number: 55

Youth career
- –2010: Chrobry Nowogrodziec
- 2010–2015: Zagłębie Lubin

Senior career*
Years	Team	Apps	(Gls)
2015–2023	Zagłębie Lubin II	95	(12)
2016–2023	Zagłębie Lubin	38	(1)
2023–2026	Stal Stalowa Wola	62	(7)
2026–	Resovia	0	(0)

International career
2017	Poland U20	1	(0)
- * Club domestic league appearances and goals as of 11:16, 31 May 2026 (UTC)

Damian Oko (born 22 January 1997) is a Polish professional footballer who plays as a centre-back for II liga club Resovia.

== Club career ==
From 2017 to 2023, he was a player for Zagłębie Lubin, for whom he played 38 matches in the Ekstraklasa, scoring one goal. In the 2022–23 season, he appeared in the club's second-league reserves, with ten games, including five full games for them. On 21 July 2023, he signed for second-league newcomer Stal Stalowa Wola, making his debut for the club on 6 August in an away fixture against Wisła Puławy, which was drawn 1–1. On 3 March 2024, he secured his first goal for the team, setting up a 1–1 result against Chojniczanka Chojnice. In 2024, he progressed to the second tier with them.

In the 2024–25 season, Oko made his first appearance on 20 July 2024 in the opening round against Górnik Łęczna. After a difficult start to the campaign, Oko re-established himself in the spring as a central figure in the defence, playing full matches on a regular basis. He scored his only goal of the season on 3 May 2025 in a 3–2 away win over Polonia Warsaw. Disciplinary issues marked part of his campaign. He collected four yellow cards and was sent off in the 82nd minute against Znicz Pruszków on 9 May 2025. Overall, during the 2024–25 season, he made 17 league appearances and scored one goal.

On 3 July 2026, Oko moved to fellow third-tier club Resovia on a one-year deal with an option for another year.

== Honours ==
Zagłębie Lubin II

- III liga, group III: 2021–22
- IV liga Lower Silesia West: 2016–17
- Polish Cup (Lower Silesia regionals): 2016–17
- Polish Cup (Legnica regionals): 2016–17, 2018–19

Individual

- Polish Union of Footballers' II liga Team of the Season: 2023–24
