= Bartłomiej Smolarczyk =

Polish footballer (born 2003)

Personal information
- Date of birth: 2 July 2003 (age 23)
- Place of birth: Warsaw, Poland
- Height: 1.91 m (6 ft 3 in)
- Position: Defender

Team information
- Current team: Korona Kielce
- Number: 24

Youth career
- –2019: Escola Varsovia
- 2019–2021: Pogoń Szczecin

Senior career*
Years	Team	Apps	(Gls)
2021–2022	Ząbkovia Ząbki	44	(3)
2022–2024	FC Dordrecht	33	(0)
2024–	Korona Kielce	32	(1)
2024–2025	Korona Kielce II	4	(0)

International career
2023–2024	Poland U20	10	(0)
2023–2025	Poland U21	4	(0)
- * Club domestic league appearances and goals as of 21:30, 29 May 2026 (UTC)

Bartłomiej Smolarczyk (born 2 July 2003) is a Polish professional footballer who plays as a defender for Ekstraklasa club Korona Kielce.

== Club career ==
In 2022, Smolarczyk signed for Dutch side FC Dordrecht. He made his debut on 19 August 2022, entering the pitch in the 80th minute of a 2–1 league win over Jong FC Utrecht.

On 24 July 2024, Smolarczyk joined Korona Kielce on a three-year contract, with an optional fourth year.

== International career ==
Smolarczyk has been called up to represent Poland internationally at youth level. He was first called up to the Poland under-20 team in 2023.

== Style of play ==
Smolarczyk mainly operates as a defender. He is known for his strength.

== Personal life ==
Smolarczyk is a native of Warsaw, Poland. Smolarczyk has a younger brother, who is also a footballer.

== Career statistics ==
As of match played 23 May 2026

Appearances and goals by club, season and competition
Club	Season	League			National cup (Note: Includes KNVB Cup, Polish Cup)		Europe		Other		Total	
Club	Season	Division	Apps	Goals	Apps	Goals	Apps	Goals	Apps	Goals	Apps	Goals
Ząbkovia Ząbki	2020–21	IV liga Masovia (Warsaw)	9	0	—		—		2 (Note: Appearances in IV liga Masovia promotion play-offs)	0	11	0
Ząbkovia Ząbki	2021–22	IV liga Masovia I	33	3	—		—		—		33	3
Ząbkovia Ząbki	Total		42	3	—		—		2	0	44	3
FC Dordrecht	2022–23	Eerste Divisie	13	0	0	0	—		—		13	0
FC Dordrecht	2023–24	Eerste Divisie	20	0	2	0	—		0	0	22	0
FC Dordrecht	Total		33	0	2	0	—		0	0	35	0
Korona Kielce	2024–25	Ekstraklasa	13	0	4	0	—		—		17	0
Korona Kielce	2025–26	Ekstraklasa	19	1	2	0	—		—		21	1
Korona Kielce	Total		32	1	6	0	—		—		38	1
Korona Kielce II	2024–25	III liga, group IV	3	0	—		—		—		3	0
Korona Kielce II	2025–26	III liga, gr. IV	1	0	0	0	—		—		1	0
Korona Kielce II	Total		4	0	0	0	—		—		4	0
Career total			111	4	8	0	0	0	2	0	121	4

== Honours ==
Ząbkovia Ząbki

- IV liga Masovia: 2020–21 (Warsaw group)
