= Miroslav Čopjak =

Czech football manager (1963–2021)

Personal information
- Date of birth: 14 September 1963
- Place of birth: Klatovy, Czechoslovakia
- Date of death: 20 December 2021 (aged 58)

Managerial career
- Years: Team
- 2003: Świt Nowy Dwór Mazowiecki
- 2005–2006: Odra Opole
- 2007: FK Třinec
- 2008: Zagłębie Sosnowiec
- 2009: Naprzod Zawada
- 2009: ŁKS Łaka
- 2009–2010: Ruch Wysokie Mazowieckie
- 2010: Resovia
- 2010–2011: Odra Wodzisław
- 2011: Bodva Moldava nad Bodvou
- 2012–2013: SK Dětmarovice
- 2013–2015: Lokomotiva Petrovice
- 2015–2016: Nadwiślan Góra
- 2021: Piast Cieszyn

Miroslav Čopjak (14 September 1963 – 20 December 2021) was a Czech football manager.

== Managerial career ==
During his managerial career, he managed the following clubs: Lukullus Świt Nowy Dwór Mazowiecki, Odra Opole, FK Třinec, Zagłębie Sosnowiec, Naprzód Zawada, Ruch Wysokie Mazowieckie, Resovia, Odra Wodzisław Śląski, Bodva Moldava nad Bodvou, SK Dětmarovice, Lokomotiva Petrovice, Nadwiślan Góra and Piast Cieszyn.

On 16 May 2003, he became the coach of Lukullus Świt Nowy Dwór Mazowiecki, with whom, for the first time in the history of the club, he was promoted to the Ekstraklasa through play-offs against Szczakowianka Jaworzno. He stayed there until 2 November 2003, as he was dismissed after 10 games by club officials due to poor performance. On 26 May 2005, he was appointed coach of the Odra Opole with which in the 2005–06 season he took second place in the third group of the third league and then he was promoted to the second league after the play-offs against Radomiak Radom. He was released from Odra Opole on 19 November 2006, after poor results in the autumn round.

From July 2021 until his death in December 2021, he was a manager of Piast Cieszyn in the Polish regional league.

== Death ==
He died on 20 December 2021 at the age of 58. On 23 December 2021, he was buried at the cemetery in Karviná, Czech Republic.
