= Resovia (football) =

- Full name: CWKS Resovia Rzeszów Spółka Akcyjna
- Nicknames: Resoviacy (The Resoviaks); Sovia; Wojskowi (The Martials); Maltańscy Wojownicy (The Maltese Warriors); Reska
- Short name: Resovia
- Founded: 1905; 121 years ago
- Stadium: Stadion Miejski w Rzeszowie
- Capacity: 3,420
- Owner: CWKS Resovia
- Chairman: Leszek Ochab
- Manager: Dariusz Kantor
- League: II liga
- 2025–26: II liga, 13th of 18
- Website: cwks-resovia.pl
Home colours	Away colours

Resovia Rzeszów, commonly referred to as Resovia, is a Polish professional association football club from Rzeszów, Subcarpathian Voivodeship. It is part of the multi-sports club CWKS Resovia, and is one of the oldest football clubs in Poland. As of the 2026–27 season, they compete in the II liga.

Among the achievements of Resovia's football team are: Championship of Lwów League in 1937, semifinals of the Polish Cup in 1981, and runners-up in the Second Division in 1983.

== History ==
Resovia was officially registered in 1905 in the then Austrian Poland, but the history of the club dates back to several football teams, formed by students of local high schools in 1905–1907. As a result, in different sources the date of the foundation of Resovia is presented as 1905, 1907, and 1910. During World War I, when most of Austrian Galicia was occupied by the Russian Empire, the activities of Resovia were suspended. The organization was recreated in 1919, and in June 1920, first stadium was opened on Krakowska Street.

Resovia was formed as a football club, but in the 1920s, other departments were added (tennis, track and field, cycling). In 1932, volleyball team was formed, later the departments of boxing, table tennis and basketball were added. On February 12, 1933, Resovia was merged with football team of the 17th Infantry Regiment, which was garrisoned in Rzeszow. As a result of the merger, the organization changed its name into Wojskowo-Cywilne Towarzystwo Sportowe (WCTS, Military-Civilian Sports Association) Resovia.

In the 1930s, Resovia was among top teams of the Lwow Regional League (see Lower Level Football Leagues in Interwar Poland). In 1937, it won the regional championship, qualifying to the first round of the Ekstraklasa playoffs, where it faced Unia Lublin, Strzelec Janowa Dolina and Rewera Stanislawow. Resovia finished in the second spot, behind Unia Lublin.

The cooperation with the military ended in 1938, when Resovia received support from Rzeszów branch of the H. Cegielski – Poznań factory (currently: Zelmer Household Appliances). In 1938–1939, Resovia's official name was Sports Club H. Cegielski Poznań Resovia.

== League history ==
As of the 2026–27 season

Name	Level	Number of seasons
Ekstraklasa	1	-
I liga	2	20
II liga	3	40
III liga	4	15

== Club names ==
- 1909–1933 – Cywilno-Wojskowy Klub Sportowy Resovia
- 1933 – Ogniwo Rzeszów (after merger with KS Wisłok Rzeszów)
- 1956–1967 – MZKS Resovia
- 1967 – CWKS Resovia (after merger with KS Bieszczady Rzeszów)
- 2003–2005 – CWKS Resovia Cenowa Bomba Resgraph
- 2005–2018 – CWKS Resovia
- 2018–2023 – "Apklan" Resovia
- 2023–present – CWKS Resovia

== Players ==
=== Current squad ===
As of 15 September 2026

Note: Flags indicate national team as defined under FIFA eligibility rules; some limited exceptions apply. Players may hold more than one non-FIFA nationality.

No.	Pos.	Nation	Player
1	GK	POL	Jakub Tetyk
2	DF	POL	Jakub Banach
3	MF	POL	Miłosz Leśniak
4	DF	POL	Myles Asei Dantoni
5	MF	POL	Kajetan Ciechanowicz
7	MF	POL	Mikołaj Szkiela
8	MF	POL	Nikodem Kuzera (on loan from Korona Kielce II)
9	FW	COL	Javier Mateo Ortíz
10	MF	POL	Jakub Letniowski
11	FW	POL	Bartosz Zimnicki
14	MF	POL	Mateusz Szwoch
16	DF	POL	Gracjan Czapniewski
17	DF	POL	Bartosz Grasza
18	MF	POL	Szymon Mida (on loan from Odra Opole)
19	MF	POL	Marcel Żymełka

No.	Pos.	Nation	Player
20	MF	POL	Adam Chojecki (on loan from Korona Kielce)
21	DF	POL	Bartosz Ciszewski
22	MF	POL	Kornel Rębisz
23	DF	POL	Mateusz Geniec
25	MF	POL	Gracjan Jaroch
26	MF	POL	Rafał Bajek
27	FW	POL	Piotr Krawczyk
31	MF	POL	Jakub Staniszewski
55	DF	POL	Damian Oko
69	FW	CZE	Jan Silný
77	DF	POL	Patryk Romanowski
88	GK	POL	Bartosz Gacek
91	GK	POL	Kuba Bochniarz
98	MF	POL	Mateusz Czyżycki

=== Out on loan ===
Note: Flags indicate national team as defined under FIFA eligibility rules; some limited exceptions apply. Players may hold more than one non-FIFA nationality.

No.	Pos.	Nation	Player
15	FW	POL	Damian Kotecki (at KS Wiązownica until 30 June 2027)
70	FW	POL	Piotr Matusek (at Polonia Przemyśl until 30 June 2027)
—	GK	POL	Filip Dziurgot (at Stal Łańcut until 30 June 2027)

=== Notable players ===
(Poland)

- Spirydion Albański
- Stanisław Baran
- Michał Benkowski
- Adrian Bergier
- Jarosław Białek
- Piotr Chlipała
- Piotr Codello
- Jan Domarski
- Konrad Domoń
- Łukasz Dzierżęga
- Oskar Fryc
- Sebastian Głaz
- Michał Iliński
- Witold Jakubowski
- Tomasz Jakuszewski
- Piotr Kamiński
- Łukasz Korab

(Poland)

- Kamil Kościelny
- Tomasz Król
- Marek Kusiak
- Damian Łanucha
- Bartosz Madeja
- Piotr Marynowski
- Dawid Mastej
- Łukasz Morawski
- Maciej Nalepa
- Jarosław Piątkowski
- Marcin Pietrucha
- Mateusz Podstolak
- Krystian Prymula
- Mateusz Siedlarz
- Waldemar Sotnicki
- Szymon Stencel
- Piotr Szalacha

(Poland)

- Mateusz Szyszko
- Paweł Ślęzak
- Sławomir Świst
- Rafał Turczyn
- Jakub Warchoł
- Mariusz Wiktor
- Rafał Zawiślan

(Bermuda)

- Chris Lonsdale

(Czech Republic)

- Ilja Zítka

(Slovakia)

- Pavol Húšťava
- Ján Krupa

(Ukraine)

- Lubomir Ivanski

== Coaching staff ==
As of 16 September 2026

Manager	(Poland) Dariusz Kantor
Assistant manager	(Poland) Kamil Król
Goalkeeping coach	(Poland) Patryk Barszcz
Analyst coach	(Poland) Sergiusz Kowalski
Strength and conditioning coach	(Poland) Jakub Kurek
Physiotherapist	(Poland) Radosław Maciąg
Physiotherapist	(Poland) Karolina Rzeszutek
Team manager	(Poland) Bartosz Czerkies

== Managerial history ==
- (Poland) Henryk Rożek (2003)
- (Poland) Maciej Huzarski (2003–2004)
- (Poland) Marek Kramarz (caretaker) (2004)
- (Poland) Ferdynand Kanas (2004–2005)
- (Poland) Wiesław Gołda (2005–2006)
- (Poland) Maciej Huzarski & (Poland) Marek Kramarz (2006–2007)
- (Poland) Tomasz Tułacz (2007–2009)
- (Poland) Mirosław Hajdo (2009–2010)
- (Czech Republic) Miroslav Čopjak (2010)
- (Poland) Artur Łuczyk (caretaker) (2010)
- (Poland) Wojciech Borecki (2010–2011)
- (Poland) Artur Łuczyk (2011)
- (Poland) Marcin Jałocha (2011–2012)
- (Poland) Tomasz Tułacz (2012–2013)
- (Poland) Roman Borawski (2013–2014)
- (Poland) Maciej Huzarski (2014–2015)
- (Poland) Szymon Szydełko (caretaker) (2015)
- (Poland) Dariusz Jęczkowski (2015–2016)
- (Poland) Szymon Szydełko (2016–2017)
- (Poland) Szymon Grabowski (2017–2020)
- (Poland) Jacek Trzeciak (2020)
- (Poland) Szymon Grabowski (2020)
- (Poland) Radosław Mroczkowski (2020–2021)
- (Poland) Dawid Kroczek (2021–2022)
- (Poland) Tomasz Grzegorczyk (2022)
- (Poland) Mirosław Hajdo (2022–2023)
- (Poland) Jakub Żukowski (caretaker) (2023)
- (Poland) Rafał Ulatowski (2023–2024)
- (Poland) Jakub Żukowski (2024)
- (Poland) Piotr Kołc (2024–2025)
- (Poland) Paweł Młynarczyk (2025–2026)
- (Poland) Kamil Kuzera (2026)
- (Poland) Dariusz Kantor (2026–present)

== See also ==
- Resovia (sports club)
- Resovia (basketball)
- Resovia (volleyball)
