= Szymon Szymański (basketball) =

Polish basketball player (born 1996)

Resovia
- Positions: Centre; Power forward
- League: I liga

Personal information
- Born: 4 January 1996 (age 29)
- Listed height: 206 cm (6 ft 9 in)

Career information
- Playing career: 2011–present

Career history
- Resovia
- 2011–2012: AZS II Politechnika Warszawska
- 2013–2015: SMS PZKosz Władysławowo
- 2015–2016: Muszkieterowie Nowa Sól
- 2016–2017: Rosa II Radom
- 2017–2018: Rosa Radom
- 2018–2020: Sokół Łańcut
- 2020–2021: GTK Gliwice
- 2021: GTK AZS II Gliwice
- 2021–2022: KKK MOSiR Krosno
- 2023–: Resovia

Szymon Szymański (born 4 January 1996) is a Polish professional basketball player playing as a centre or power forward for Resovia.

== Career ==
A youth graduate of Resovia, his professional career started with Rosa Radom, initially with the reserve team. He was a standout player for the reserves in the I liga winning against much stronger opponents,, and was praised in particular for his double-double in a match against Astoria Bydgoszcz. Considered one of the top prospects in the second tier, he graduated to Rosa's PLK team, where he debuted in the European Champions League in 2017.

He was loaned on 21 December 2018 by Rosa Radom to Sokół Łańcut.

He joined GTK Gliwice on 10 June 2020.

On 3 December 2021 he joined KKK MOSiR Krosno as a permanent signing. His contract was extended for the following season in June 2022 during a squad rebuild, however this was annulled a month later by the club due to an injury.

On his 27th birthday, in 2023 he joined Resovia, the same club his father Artur Szymański played for in the 80s.
