= Dagmar Uebelhör =

German footballer

Personal information
- Date of birth: 10 December 1965 (age 60)
- Position: Defender

Senior career*
Years	Team	Apps	(Gls)
1987–1990 (?)	Bayern Munich		

International career
- Germany
- * Club domestic league appearances and goals

Dagmar Uebelhör (born 10 December 1965) is a German women's international footballer who plays as a defender. She is a member of the Germany women's national football team. She was part of the team at the UEFA Women's Euro 1991. On club level she played for Bayern Munich and competed in the final at the 1987–88 DFB-Pokal (women) and 1989–90 DFB-Pokal (women).
