= 2014–15 Frauen-Regionalliga =

Regionalliga (women)
- Season: 2014–15
- Champions: SV Henstedt-Ulzburg (Nord); Blau-Weiß Hohen Neuendorf (Nordost); Borussia Mönchengladbach (West); 1. FFC 08 Niederkirchen (Südwest); SC Sand II (Süd)
- Promoted: SV Henstedt-Ulzburg (Nord); Blau-Weiß Hohen Neuendorf (Nordost); Borussia Mönchengladbach (West); 1. FFC 08 Niederkirchen (Südwest); SC Sand II (Süd)
- Relegated: TuRa Meldorf; SV Ahlerstedt/Ottendorf; 1. FC Neubrandenburg 04; BSV Al-Dersimspor; VfL Bochum II; FFC Heike Rheine; Düsseldorfer CfR links FFV Fortuna Göcklingen; FSV Jägersburg; FC Bitburg; VfL Sindelfingen II; 1. FFC Frankfurt III
- Matches played: 688
- Goals scored: 2,537 (3.69 per match)
- Top goalscorer: Alina Witt (40 goals)

The 2014–15 season of the Regionalliga (women) was the eighth season of Germany's third-tier women's football league using the current format.

== Nord ==
Pos	Team	Pld	W	D	L	GF	GA	GD	Pts	Qualification or relegation
1	SV Henstedt-Ulzburg (C, P)	22	18	4	0	83	20	+63	58	Promotion to 2015–16 2. Bundesliga
2	FC Bergedorf 85	22	17	0	5	59	23	+36	51	
3	TSV Limmer	22	12	3	7	50	43	+7	39	
4	Bramfelder SV	22	11	4	7	53	35	+18	37	
5	TSG Burg Gretesch	22	9	4	9	24	39	−15	31	
6	Werder Bremen II	22	8	6	8	43	45	−2	30	
7	Fortuna Celle	22	9	1	12	49	64	−15	28	
8	Hamburger SV	22	8	2	12	34	36	−2	26	
9	TSV Havelse	22	7	5	10	37	43	−6	26	
10	SV Heidekraut Andervenne	22	6	5	11	32	42	−10	23	
11	TuRa Meldorf (R)	22	3	5	14	15	55	−40	14	Relegation to Verbandsliga/Oberliga
12	SV Ahlerstedt/Ottendorf (R)	22	4	1	17	18	52	−34	13	Relegation to Verbandsliga/Oberliga

Rules for classification: 1) Points; 2) Goal difference; 3) Goals scored
(C) Champions; (P) Promoted; (R) Relegated

== Nordost ==
Pos	Team	Pld	W	D	L	GF	GA	GD	Pts	Qualification or relegation
1	Blau-Weiß Hohen Neuendorf (C, P)	20	15	2	3	53	18	+35	47	Promotion to 2015–16 2. Bundesliga
2	FF USV Jena II	20	13	4	3	57	16	+41	43	
3	SV Eintracht Leipzig-Süd	20	12	4	4	44	35	+9	40	
4	FC Viktoria 1889 Berlin	20	10	5	5	38	18	+20	35	
5	FFV Leipzig II	20	8	6	6	33	26	+7	30	
6	1. FFC Fortuna Dresden	20	7	7	6	34	21	+13	28	
7	FC Erzgebirge Aue	20	7	6	7	34	30	+4	27	
8	BSC Marzahn	20	7	4	9	28	29	−1	25	
9	Blau-Weiß Beelitz	20	4	4	12	23	45	−22	16	
10	Hallescher FC	20	4	3	13	19	45	−26	15	
11	1. FC Neubrandenburg 04 (R)	20	0	1	19	5	85	−80	1	Relegation to Landesliga
12	BSV Al-Dersimspor (Note: BSV Al-Dersimspor withdrew their participation due to limited personnel.) (R)	0	0	0	0	0	0	0	0	Relegation to Landesliga

Rules for classification: 1) Points; 2) Goal difference; 3) Goals scored
(C) Champions; (P) Promoted; (R) Relegated

== West ==
Pos	Team	Pld	W	D	L	GF	GA	GD	Pts	Qualification or relegation
1	Borussia Mönchengladbach (C, P)	26	24	2	0	99	8	+91	74	Promotion to 2015–16 2. Bundesliga
2	MSV Duisburg II	26	16	5	5	61	30	+31	53	
3	1. FC Köln II	26	15	4	7	56	24	+32	49	
4	SGS Essen II	26	13	5	8	57	45	+12	44	
5	SC Fortuna Köln	26	12	4	10	44	41	+3	40	
6	Warendorfer SU	26	11	5	10	42	48	−6	38	
7	VfL Bochum II (B, R)	26	11	3	12	53	52	+1	36	Relegation to Verbandsliga (Note: VfL Bochum II was relegated due to the insolvency of the first team.)
8	Bayer 04 Leverkusen II	26	10	3	13	45	47	−2	33	
9	Borussia Bocholt	26	8	8	10	37	41	−4	32	
10	Sportfreunde Siegen	26	9	4	13	54	67	−13	31	
11	GSV Moers	26	8	4	14	37	59	−22	28	
12	SV Eintracht Solingen	26	5	9	12	38	57	−19	24	
13	FFC Heike Rheine (R)	26	6	4	16	27	62	−35	22	Relegation to Verbandsliga
14	Düsseldorfer CfR links (R)	26	3	2	21	31	100	−69	11	Relegation to Verbandsliga

Rules for classification: 1) Points; 2) Goal difference; 3) Goals scored
(B) ?; (C) Champions; (P) Promoted; (R) Relegated

== Südwest ==
Pos	Team	Pld	W	D	L	GF	GA	GD	Pts	Qualification or relegation
1	TSV Schott Mainz (C, P)	22	22	0	0	116	6	+110	66	Promotion to 2015–16 2. Bundesliga
2	SG Andernach	22	15	3	4	54	26	+28	48	
3	1. FC Saarbrücken II	22	15	1	6	58	37	+21	46	
4	TuS Issel	22	11	4	7	59	35	+24	37	
5	SV Dirmingen	22	11	2	9	37	35	+2	35	
6	SC 13 Bad Neuenahr	22	9	4	9	28	42	−14	31	
7	DJK Saarwellingen	22	9	1	12	41	41	0	28	
8	FC Marnheim	22	8	4	10	49	55	−6	28	
9	TuS Wörrstadt	22	5	3	14	26	49	−23	18	
10	FFV Fortuna Göcklingen (R)	22	4	6	12	27	67	−40	18	Relegation to Verbandsliga
11	FSV Jägersburg (R)	22	4	2	16	22	67	−45	14	Relegation to Verbandsliga
12	FC Bitburg (R)	22	3	2	17	23	80	−57	11	Relegation to Verbandsliga

Rules for classification: 1) Points; 2) Goal difference; 3) Goals scored
(C) Champions; (P) Promoted; (R) Relegated

== Süd ==
Pos	Team	Pld	W	D	L	GF	GA	GD	Pts	Qualification or relegation
1	Eintracht Wetzlar (C, P)	22	19	0	3	60	17	+43	57	Promotion to 2015–16 2. Bundesliga
2	FFC Wacker München	22	12	6	4	39	20	+19	42	
3	TSV Schwaben Augsburg	22	12	3	7	61	39	+22	39	
4	Hegauer FV	22	11	4	7	45	30	+15	37	
5	TSV Jahn Calden	22	9	7	6	49	41	+8	34	
6	1. FC Nürnberg	22	9	4	9	31	38	−7	31	
7	FC Ingolstadt 04	22	7	7	8	35	30	+5	28	
8	FV Löchgau	22	7	6	9	32	43	−11	27	
9	TV Derendingen	22	8	3	11	36	54	−18	27	
10	Eintracht Frankfurt	22	7	2	13	25	42	−17	23	
11	VfL Sindelfingen II (R)	22	5	3	14	18	33	−15	18	Relegation to Oberliga
12	1. FFC Frankfurt III (R)	22	3	1	18	20	64	−44	10	Relegation to Oberliga

Rules for classification: 1) Points; 2) Goal difference; 3) Goals scored
(C) Champions; (P) Promoted; (R) Relegated

== Top scorers ==
As of 4 June 2015

Rank	Scorer	Club	Goals
1	(Germany) Alina Witt	SV Henstedt-Ulzburg	40
2	(Germany) Tina Doris Ruh	FC Marnheim	30
3	(Germany) Fabienne Stejskal	FC Bergedorf 85	27
4	(Germany) Kyra Densing	Borussia Mönchengladbach	25
5	(Germany) Vivien Gaj	SGS Essen II	24
6	(Germany) Kelly Simons	Borussia Mönchengladbach	22
6	(Germany) Mona Budnick	TSV Schwaben Augsburg	22
6	(Germany) Annika Leber	TSV Schott Mainz	22
9	(Germany) Laura Freigang	TSV Schott Mainz	20
10	(Germany) Rebecca Konhaeuser	Eintracht Wetzlar	19
