= Szymon Grabowski =

Polish association football player and manager (born 1981)

Personal information
- Full name: Szymon Grabowski
- Date of birth: 8 April 1981 (age 45)
- Place of birth: Rzeszów, Poland
- Height: 1.70 m (5 ft 7 in)
- Position: Midfielder

Youth career
- Resovia

Senior career*
Years	Team	Apps	(Gls)
1998–2002	Resovia	14	(0)
2000	→ Błękitni Ropczyce (loan)		
2002	→ Izolator Boguchwała (loan)		
2002–2003	Strug Tyczyn		
2004	Resovia	28	(11)
2005	Strug Tyczyn		
2006–2009	Resovia	84	(10)
2009	MKS Kańczuga		
2010–2013	Wisłok Strzyżów		
2014–2015	LKS Przybyszówka		
2016	Wisłok Strzyżów		

Managerial career
- 2010–2013: Wisłok Strzyżów (player-manager)
- 2017–2020: Resovia
- 2020: Resovia
- 2021–2022: Podhale Nowy Targ
- 2022–2023: Stomil Olsztyn
- 2023–2024: Lechia Gdańsk
- 2025: ŁKS Łódź
- * Club domestic league appearances and goals

Szymon Grabowski (born 8 April 1981) is a Polish professional football manager and former player who played as a midfielder. He was most recently in charge of I liga club ŁKS Łódź.

== Playing career ==
Born in Rzeszów, Grabowski began playing football for the youth teams of his local team Resovia Rzeszów. He broke into the first team in 1998, and made his first team debut on the 8 August 1998, in a 2–0 home win against Dynovia Dynów. During his playing career Grabowski played in the lower divisions of Polish football, never managing to break into the fully professional leagues. During his first spell with Resovia he went out on loan to Błękitni Ropczyce and Izolator Boguchwała, before making a move to Strug Tyczyn. Grabowski stayed with Strug for 18 months before rejoining Resovia in early 2004. His second stint lasted only 12 months, after which he swapped Resovia for Strug again, before returning to Resovia once again another 12 months later. At that point, Grabowski cemented himself as an important first team player, and over the next three years appeared in most of the team's games, including the 2006–07 season when Resovia won the Subcarpathia group of IV liga, and the 2008–09 season when the team were crowned champions of the Lublin–Subcarpathia group of III liga.

After securing his second promotion with Resovia, Grabowski left the team for a final time. He went on to play for MKS Kańczuga, Wisłok Strzyżów (as a player-manager), LKS Przybyszówka, and finally Wisłok Strzyżów again, before retiring as a player in 2016.

== Managerial career ==
=== Resovia ===
Grabowski's first taste of management came during his first spell with Wisłok Strzyżów, where he was a player-manager from 2010 to 2013. In 2014 he joined Resovia's coaching staff as an assistant, a role he held until manager Maciej Huzarski was sacked in September 2015. Grabowski's next chance to manage a team came in 2017 when he was the position of manager at Resovia. Grabowski oversaw the club's group win in the 2017–18 season, resulting in promotion to II liga, and helped the club to become a stable third-tier club, and achieving promotion to I liga in 2020. However, following a poor start to the 2020–21 season, he was dismissed on 1 October 2020 via an e-mail after an away loss to Odra Opole, before being reinstated the following day. He was ultimately removed from his position on 25 November.

=== Podhale and Stomil Olsztyn ===
In July 2021, Grabowski joined III liga Podhale Nowy Targ. Despite not managing to achieve promotion, Grabowski received praise for leading Podhale to a fifth-place finish, which saw him being offered an opportunity to manage II liga club Stomil Olsztyn. Grabowski's influence on a team once again proved to be positive as Stomil reached the 2022–23 play-off final. Grabowski's team just missed out on promotion however as they lost the final and the final promotion place to Motor Lublin on penalties. Despite once again failing to achieve promotion, Grabowski's positive impact over the Stomil team attracted attention from teams in higher divisions.

=== Lechia Gdańsk ===
In June 2023, recently relegated Lechia Gdańsk appointed Grabowski as manager after buying out his contract. Lechia earned promotion back to Ekstraklasa on their first attempt, after a 4–3 win over Wisła Kraków on 11 May 2024. Eight days later, they were crowned I liga champions following a 2–1 Tricity Derby victory over Arka Gdynia. On 23 November 2024, Lechia announced in a statement that Grabowski had been suspended from his duties as head coach. Four days later, Grabowski terminated his contract with the club.

=== ŁKS Łódź ===
On 19 May 2025, second division side ŁKS Łódź announced Grabowski's appointment as manager for the next two seasons, starting from 1 June 2025. On 11 November, he was sacked following a string of inconsistent results. At the time of his departure, ŁKS were 12th in the league table, with six wins after 16 games played.

== Managerial statistics ==
As of match played 8 November 2025

Managerial record by team and tenure
Team	From	To	Record							
Team	From	To	G	W	D	L	GF	GA	GD	Win %
Resovia	20 June 2017	1 October 2020	121	57	31	33	189	135	+54	47.11
Resovia	2 October 2020	25 November 2020	7	1	2	4	5	10	−5	14.29
Podhale Nowy Targ	20 June 2021	30 June 2022	44	26	8	10	111	54	+57	59.09
Stomil Olsztyn	30 June 2022	14 June 2023	37	15	15	7	57	41	+16	40.54
Lechia Gdańsk	14 June 2023	23 November 2024	52	23	10	19	82	72	+10	44.23
ŁKS Łódź	1 June 2025	11 November 2025	18	7	3	8	30	31	−1	38.89
Total			279	129	69	81	474	343	+131	46.24

== Honours ==
=== Player ===
Resovia

- III liga Lublin-Subcarpathia: 2008–09
- IV liga Subcarpathia: 2006–07

=== Manager ===
Resovia

- III liga, group IV: 2017–18
- Polish Cup (Subcarpathia regionals): 2017–18
- Polish Cup (Rzeszów-Dębica regionals): 2017–18

Podhale Nowy Targ

- Polish Cup (Lesser Poland regionals): 2021–22 (Autumn)

Lechia Gdańsk

- I liga: 2023–24

Individual

- Polish Union of Footballers' I liga Coach of the Season: 2023–24
