= Mirosław Hajdo =

Polish football manager

Personal information
- Date of birth: 3 August 1970 (age 56)
- Place of birth: Tarnów, Poland

Team information
- Current team: Cracovia Training Center (director)

Managerial career
- Years: Team
- 1998–2001: Cracovia (youth)
- 2002: Cracovia
- 2002–2003: Cracovia (youth)
- 2003: Dalin Myślenice
- 2003–2006: Cracovia (youth)
- 2006–2007: MZKS Alwernia
- 2007–2008: Kolejarz Stróże
- 2009: Kmita Zabierzów
- 2009: Kolejarz Stróże
- 2009–2010: Resovia
- 2010–2011: Bruk-Bet Termalica Nieciecza
- 2011–2012: Przebój Wolbrom
- 2012: Chojniczanka Chojnice
- 2013: Sandecja Nowy Sącz
- 2014: Cracovia
- 2014–2018: Garbarnia Kraków
- 2019–2020: Motor Lublin
- 2022–2023: Resovia
- 2025: Wiślanie Skawina

Mirosław Hajdo (born 3 August 1970) is a Polish professional football manager who is currently the director of the Cracovia Training Center.

== Managerial statistics ==
As of match played 7 June 2025

Managerial record by team and tenure
Team	From	To	Record							
Team	From	To	G	W	D	L	GF	GA	GD	Win %
Cracovia	20 May 2002	30 June 2002	4	3	1	0	9	3	+6	75.00
Dalin Myślenice	January 2003	June 2003	17	7	5	5	19	16	+3	41.18
MZKS Alwernia	26 June 2006	7 April 2007	22	13	5	4	35	17	+18	59.09
Kolejarz Stróże	7 April 2007	15 September 2008	59	28	16	15	82	58	+24	47.46
Kmita Zabierzów	5 January 2009	14 February 2009	0	0	0	0	0	0	+0	—
Kolejarz Stróże	30 March 2009	9 June 2009	12	4	5	3	22	15	+7	33.33
Resovia	1 July 2009	11 June 2010	36	17	12	7	54	28	+26	47.22
Termalica Bruk-Bet Nieciecza	20 September 2010	7 May 2011	19	7	4	8	21	24	−3	36.84
Przebój Wolbrom	2 July 2011	11 April 2012	23	11	6	6	38	13	+25	47.83
Chojniczanka Chojnice	11 April 2012	30 June 2012	10	2	3	5	14	13	+1	20.00
Sandecja Nowy Sącz	18 January 2013	8 August 2013	20	5	7	8	22	28	−6	25.00
Cracovia	13 May 2014	2 June 2014	4	1	2	1	5	5	+0	25.00
Garbarnia Kraków	9 September 2014	15 October 2018	166	95	34	37	313	165	+148	57.23
Motor Lublin	24 June 2019	13 December 2020	40	18	14	8	64	36	+28	45.00
Resovia	6 September 2022	16 November 2023	45	16	9	20	59	74	−15	35.56
Wiślanie Skawina	6 May 2025	30 June 2025	6	2	0	4	7	21	−14	33.33
Total			483	229	123	131	764	516	+248	47.41

== Honours ==
Garbarnia Kraków

- III liga, group IV: 2016–17
- Polish Cup (Lesser Poland regionals): 2014–15, 2015–16
- Polish Cup (Kraków subdistrict regionals): 2014–15, 2015–16
- Polish Cup (Kraków City regionals): 2014–15, 2015–16

Motor Lublin

- III liga, group IV: 2019–20
- Polish Cup (Lublin subdistrict regionals): 2019–20
