= FSV Jägersburg =

German football club

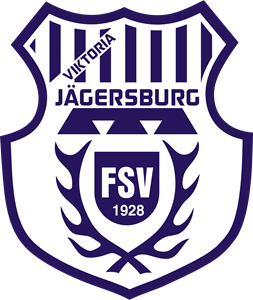
- Full name: Fußballsportverein Viktoria Jägersburg 1928 e.V.
- Founded: 1928
- Ground: Alois-Omlor-Sportpark
- Chairman: Harald Schwindt
- Manager: Thorsten Lahm
- League: Oberliga Rheinland-Pfalz/Saar (V)
- 2017–18: 6th
| Home colours | Away colours |

FSV Jägersburg is a German association football club from the Jägersburg suburb of Homburg, Saarland.

The club's men's department greatest success has been promotion to the tier five Oberliga Rheinland-Pfalz/Saar in 2015.

The club's women's department, now defunct, last played in the tier three Regionalliga Südwest in 2014–15 and has played as high as the 2. Bundesliga. It has also participated in the DFB-Pokal for women on twelve occasions.

== History ==
=== Men ===
Formed in 1928 FSV Jägersburg spend most of its history as a local amateur side. The club's rise through the league system began in the mid-1990s, winning promotion to the tier six Landesliga Saarland-Nordost in 1997. It played at this level for the next six seasons until a league championship in 2002–03 took it up to the Verbandsliga Saarland. Jägersburg played the next six seasons at this level, generally as a lower table side. It played its best season in 2008–09 when it finished runners-up, a result good enough to qualify the club for the newly introduced Saarlandliga. In the six seasons there the club finished in the top half of the table each year. A league championship in 2014–15 took FSV Jägersburg up to the tier five Oberliga Rheinland-Pfalz/Saar for the first time.

=== Women ===
The club's women's department, now defunct, last played in the tier three Regionalliga Südwest in 2014–15. The team has played as high as the 2. Bundesliga, where it participated in the 2004–05, 2005–06 and 2008–09 seasons.

It has also participated in the DFB-Pokal for women on twelve occasions, in 1986–87, 1987–88, 1992–93, 1994–95, 2002–03, 2003–04, 2004–05, 2005–06, 2006–07, 2008–09, 2009–10 and 2013–14. In 1986–87, 1987–88, 1994–95, 2004–05, 2005–06 and 2008–09 it advanced to the second round, on the other occasions it was knocked out in the first.

== Honours ==
The club's honours:

=== Men ===
- Saarlandliga
  - Champions: 2014–15
- Landesliga Saarland-Nordost
  - Champions: 2002–03

=== Women ===
- Regionalliga Südwest
  - Champions: 2007–08

== Recent seasons ==
The recent season-by-season performance of the club:

=== Men ===
| Season | Division | Tier | Position |
|---|---|---|---|
| 2002–03 | Landesliga Saarland-Nordost | VI | 1st ↑ |
| 2003–04 | Verbandsliga Saarland | V | 16th |
| 2004–05 | Verbandsliga Saarland | V | 14th |
| 2005–06 | Verbandsliga Saarland | V | 17th |
| 2006–07 | Verbandsliga Saarland | V | 15th |
| 2007–08 | Verbandsliga Saarland | V | 8th |
| 2008–09 | Verbandsliga Saarland | VI | 2nd ↑ |
| 2009–10 | Saarlandliga | VI | 10th |
| 2010–11 | Saarlandliga | VI | 9th |
| 2011–12 | Saarlandliga | VI | 5th |
| 2012–13 | Saarlandliga | VI | 5th |
| 2013–14 | Saarlandliga | VI | 10th |
| 2014–15 | Saarlandliga | VI | 1st ↑ |
| 2015–16 | Oberliga Rheinland-Pfalz/Saar | V | 8th |
| 2016–17 | Oberliga Rheinland-Pfalz/Saar | V | |

=== Women ===
| Season | Division | Tier | Position |
|---|---|---|---|
| 2003–04 | Regionalliga Südwest | II | 2nd ↑ |
| 2004–05 | 2. Bundesliga | II | 7th |
| 2005–06 | 2. Bundesliga | II | 12th ↓ |
| 2006–07 | Regionalliga Südwest | III | 3rd |
| 2007–08 | Regionalliga Südwest | III | 1st ↑ |
| 2008–09 | 2. Bundesliga | II | 12th ↓ |
| 2009–10 | Regionalliga Südwest | III | 4th |
| 2010–11 | Regionalliga Südwest | III | 5th |
| 2011–12 | Regionalliga Südwest | III | 5th |
| 2012–13 | Regionalliga Südwest | III | 4th |
| 2013–14 | Regionalliga Südwest | III | 4th |
| 2014–15 | Regionalliga Südwest | III | 11th |
| 2015–16 | inactive | | |

- Men: With the introduction of the Regionalligas in 1994 and the 3. Liga in 2008 as the new third tier, below the 2. Bundesliga, all leagues below dropped one tier. The Saarlandliga was introduced in 2009 and replaced the Verbandsliga Saarland at the sixth tier of football in the Saarland.
- Women: With the introduction of the 2. Bundesliga in 2004 the Regionalligas and leagues below dropped one tier.

| ↑ Promoted | ↓ Relegated |
