= Konrad Domoń =

Polish footballer

Personal information
- Date of birth: 5 August 1986 (age 40)
- Place of birth: Rzeszów, Poland
- Height: 1.90 m (6 ft 3 in)
- Position: Defender

Team information
- Current team: Głogovia Głogów Małopolski
- Number: 8

Youth career
- 1993–2004: Resovia

Senior career*
Years	Team	Apps	(Gls)
2004–2021	Resovia	287+	(6+)
2022	Orzeł Przeworsk	18	(1)
2022–	Głogovia Głogów Małopolski	59	(7)
- * Club domestic league appearances and goals as of 5 August 2024

Konrad Domoń (born 5 August 1986) is a Polish professional footballer who plays as a defender for Głogovia Głogów Małopolski.

== Career ==
Domoń started his career with Polish fifth division side Resovia, where he received trial offers from GKS Bełchatów and Lech Poznań in the Polish top flight, helping them earn promotion to the Polish second division after 16 seasons.

== Honours ==
Resovia

- III liga: 2008–09 (Lublin–Subcarpathia), 2013–14 (Lublin–Subcarpathia), 2017–18 (group IV)
- IV liga Subcarpathia: 2006–07
