= Mateusz Czyżycki =

Polish footballer (born 1998)

Personal information
- Full name: Mateusz Czyżycki
- Date of birth: 8 February 1998 (age 28)
- Place of birth: Brzesko, Poland
- Height: 1.75 m (5 ft 9 in)
- Position: Midfielder

Team information
- Current team: Resovia
- Number: 98

Youth career
- –2013: Okocimski KS Brzesko
- 2013–2014: BTS Brzesko
- 2014–2016: Stal Mielec

Senior career*
Years	Team	Apps	(Gls)
2016	Stal Mielec	1	(0)
2016–2018	Siarka Tarnobrzeg	46	(1)
2018–2020	Odra Opole	65	(6)
2020–2022	Warta Poznań	39	(1)
2022–2023	GKS Tychy	44	(10)
2023–2025	Korona Kielce	15	(1)
2025	Odra Opole	6	(1)
2025–	Resovia	24	(3)
- * Club domestic league appearances and goals as of 19:34, 9 June 2026 (UTC)

Mateusz Czyżycki (born 8 February 1998) is a Polish professional footballer who plays as a midfielder for II liga club Resovia.

== Club career ==
On 5 August 2020, Czyżycki signed a two-year deal with a newly promoted Ekstraklasa side Warta Poznań.

== Honours ==
Stal Mielec

- II liga: 2015–16
