= Jarosław Białek =

Polish footballer

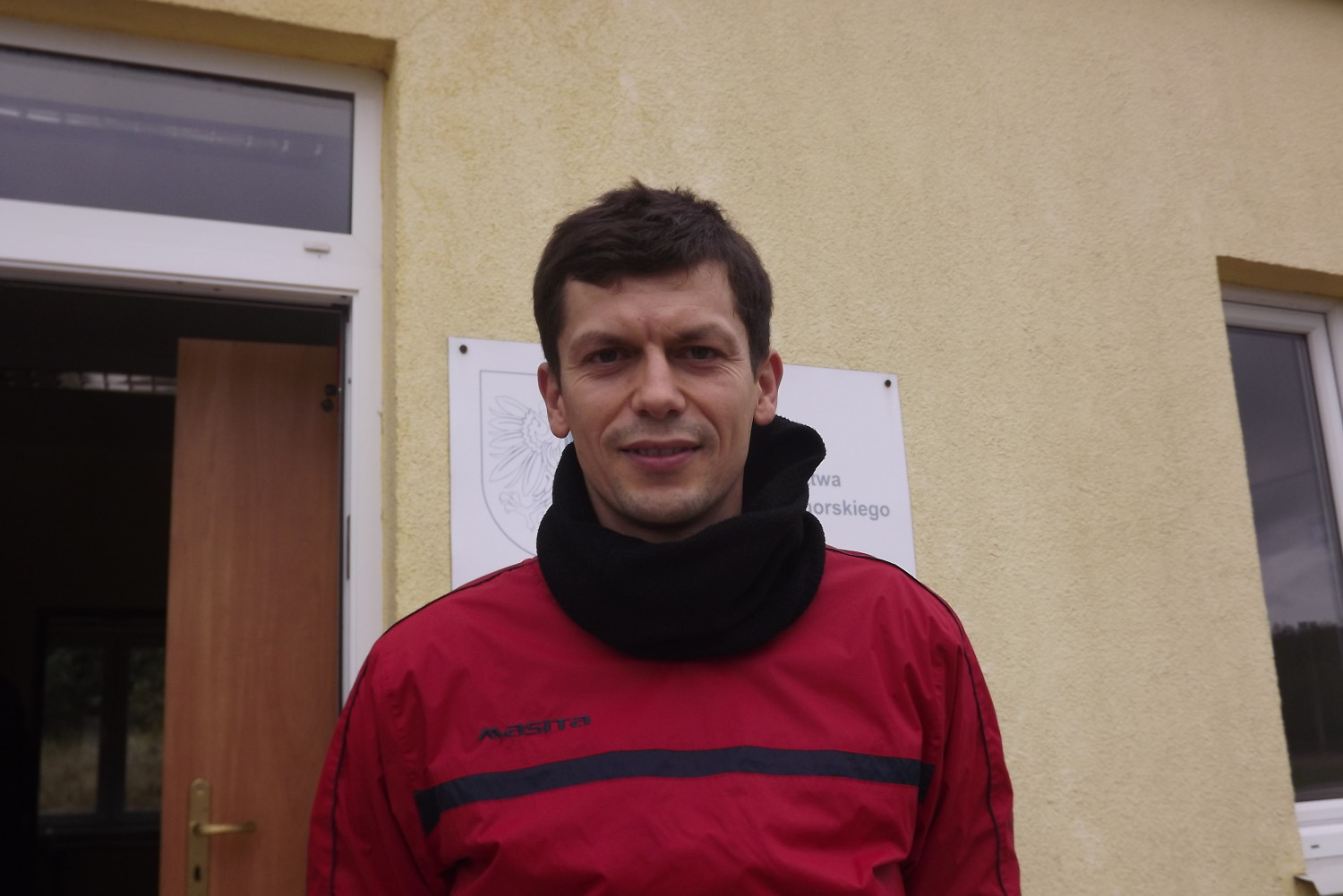
- Białek in 2016

Personal information
- Full name: Jarosław Białek
- Date of birth: 22 February 1981 (age 45)
- Place of birth: Więcbork, Poland
- Height: 1.78 m (5 ft 10 in)
- Position: Midfielder

Senior career*
Years	Team	Apps	(Gls)
1992–2000	Zawisza Bydgoszcz		
2000–2002	Lech Poznań		
2003	Aluminium Konin	9	(1)
2003–2005	Kujawiak Włocławek	32	(3)
2005–2006	Widzew Łódź	31	(0)
2007	Górnik Zabrze	12	(1)
2007–2008	Zagłębie Sosnowiec	4	(0)
2008	→ Resovia (loan)	13	(2)
2008	St Patrick's Athletic	9	(0)
2009	Podbeskidzie Bielsko-Biała	7	(0)
2010	KSZO Ostrowiec	29	(0)
2011–2012	Olimpia Grudziądz	35	(0)
2012–2013	Elana Toruń	11	(0)

Managerial career
- 2017–2019: Elana Toruń (U19)
- 2019–2020: Elana Toruń (assistant)
- 2021–2022: Pomorzanin Toruń
- 2022: Włocłavia Włocławek
- 2024: Wisła Dobrzyń nad Wisłą
- * Club domestic league appearances and goals

Jarosław Białek (born 22 February 1981) is a Polish professional football manager and former player, most recently in charge of Wisła Dobrzyń nad Wisłą.

== Career ==
In 2008, Białek moved to St. Patrick's Athletic F.C. of the League of Ireland Premier Division. He previously had played for Polish side Zagłębie Sosnowiec.

In February 2011, he joined Olimpia Grudziądz on a half-year contract.

== Honours ==
Lech Poznań

- II liga: 2001–02

Widzew Łódź

- II liga: 2005–06

Olimpia Grudziądz

- II liga West: 2010–11
