= Xavier Dziekoński =

Polish footballer

Personal information
- Full name: Xavier Dziekoński
- Date of birth: 6 October 2003 (age 23)
- Place of birth: Grajewo, Poland
- Height: 1.88 m (6 ft 2 in)
- Position: Goalkeeper

Team information
- Current team: Korona Kielce
- Number: 1

Youth career
- 2013–2018: MOSP Białystok
- 2018–2019: Jagiellonia Białystok

Senior career*
Years	Team	Apps	(Gls)
2019–2022	Jagiellonia Białystok II	10	(0)
2020–2022	Jagiellonia Białystok	28	(0)
2022–2024	Raków Częstochowa	0	(0)
2022	Raków Częstochowa II	9	(0)
2023	→ Garbarnia Kraków (loan)	15	(0)
2023–2024	→ Korona Kielce (loan)	29	(0)
2024–	Korona Kielce	51	(0)
2024–	Korona Kielce II	1	(0)

International career
2021–2024	Poland U21	2	(0)
- * Club domestic league appearances and goals as of 18:58, 25 May 2026 (UTC)

Xavier Dziekoński (born 6 October 2003) is a Polish professional footballer who plays as a goalkeeper for Ekstraklasa club Korona Kielce.

== Club career ==
=== Jagiellonia Białystok ===
On 18 June 2020, Dziekoński was submitted to the senior squad of the Ekstraklasa club Jagiellonia Białystok. On 15 July 2020, he made his league debut, in a Jagiellonia's 2–1 victory over Śląsk Wrocław. In September 2020, he was called up for the Poland national under-19 football team for a two-leg game against Denmark.

He was the Ekstraklasa's best young player of February 2021.

=== Raków Częstochowa ===
On 12 July 2022, Raków Częstochowa announced the signing of Dziekoński, who joined the club on a three-year deal with an extension option.

==== Loan to Garbarnia Kraków ====
On 17 January 2023, having only appeared for Raków's reserve side in III liga, he was loaned until the end of the season to II liga side Garbarnia Kraków.

=== Korona Kielce ===
On 29 June 2023, Dziekoński moved on loan again, joining another Ekstraklasa team Korona Kielce until the end of the season, with an option to make the move permanent. Dziekoński made 29 league appearances across the 2023–24 season, as Korona narrowly avoided relegation on the last matchday.

In June 2024, Korona exercised their buy option and signed Dziekoński to a two-year contract. He spent the first half of the 2024–25 season as Korona's first-choice goalkeeper before losing his spot to Rafał Mamla after the winter break. He was promoted back to the starting line-up ahead of the 2025–26 season. He started all 34 of Korona's league games that season, keeping nine clean sheets, and was named the Ekstraklasa Goalkeeper of the Season after its conclusion.

== Career statistics ==
As of match played 23 May 2026

Appearances and goals by club, season and competition
Club	Season	League			Polish Cup		Europe		Other		Total	
Club	Season	Division	Apps	Goals	Apps	Goals	Apps	Goals	Apps	Goals	Apps	Goals
Jagiellonia Białystok II	2020–21	III liga, gr. I	4	0	—		—		—		4	0
Jagiellonia Białystok II	2021–22	III liga, gr. I	6	0	—		—		—		6	0
Jagiellonia Białystok II	Total		10	0	—		—		—		10	0
Jagiellonia Białystok	2019–20	Ekstraklasa	2	0	—		—		—		2	0
Jagiellonia Białystok	2020–21	Ekstraklasa	16	0	1	0	—		—		17	0
Jagiellonia Białystok	2021–22	Ekstraklasa	10	0	1	0	—		—		11	0
Jagiellonia Białystok	Total		28	0	2	0	—		—		30	0
Raków Częstochowa	2022–23	Ekstraklasa	0	0	0	0	0	0	—		0	0
Raków Częstochowa II	2022–23	III liga, gr. III	9	0	0	0	—		—		9	0
Garbarnia Kraków (loan)	2022–23	II liga	15	0	—		—		—		15	0
Korona Kielce (loan)	2023–24	Ekstraklasa	29	0	1	0	—		—		30	0
Korona Kielce	2024–25	Ekstraklasa	17	0	1	0	—		—		18	0
Korona Kielce	2025–26	Ekstraklasa	34	0	0	0	—		—		34	0
Korona Kielce	Total		80	0	2	0	—		—		82	0
Korona Kielce II	2024–25	III liga, gr. IV	1	0	—		—		—		1	0
Career total			143	0	4	0	0	0	0	0	147	0

== Honours ==
Individual

- Ekstraklasa Goalkeeper of the Season: 2025–26
- Ekstraklasa Young Player of the Month: February 2021
