= Resovia (basketball) =

Resovia Basketball S.A.
- Nickname: Resowiacy; Bieszczadzkie Wilki; Wojskowi
- League: I Liga
- Founded: 1910; 116 years ago
- Arena: ROSiR Hall
- Capacity: 750
- Location: Rzeszów
- Ownership: CWKS Resovia
- Championships: Polish Champions 1 Polish Cup 1
- Website: https://resoviabasketball.pl/

Resovia is the basketball section of the Polish multi-sports club of the same name.

It was as CWKS Resovia the most successful Polish team of the 1970s. Since then it has undergone several transformations due to financial troubles; the last senior men's team played in the bottom, third tier of the league pyramid in 2009 under the name KKS Resovia Rzeszów. It currently runs an academy under the name Resovia Basket and senior club under the name Resovia Rzeszów.

Their most famous player was Wojciech Myrda.

== Honours ==
- Polish Champions: 1975
- Polish Runners-up: 1973, 1974, 1979
- Polish Championship Bronze medal: 1976, 1977
- Polish Cup Champions: 1974

== See also ==
- Resovia (sports club)
- Resovia (football)
- Resovia (volleyball)
