= Konrad Matuszewski =

Polish footballer (born 2001)

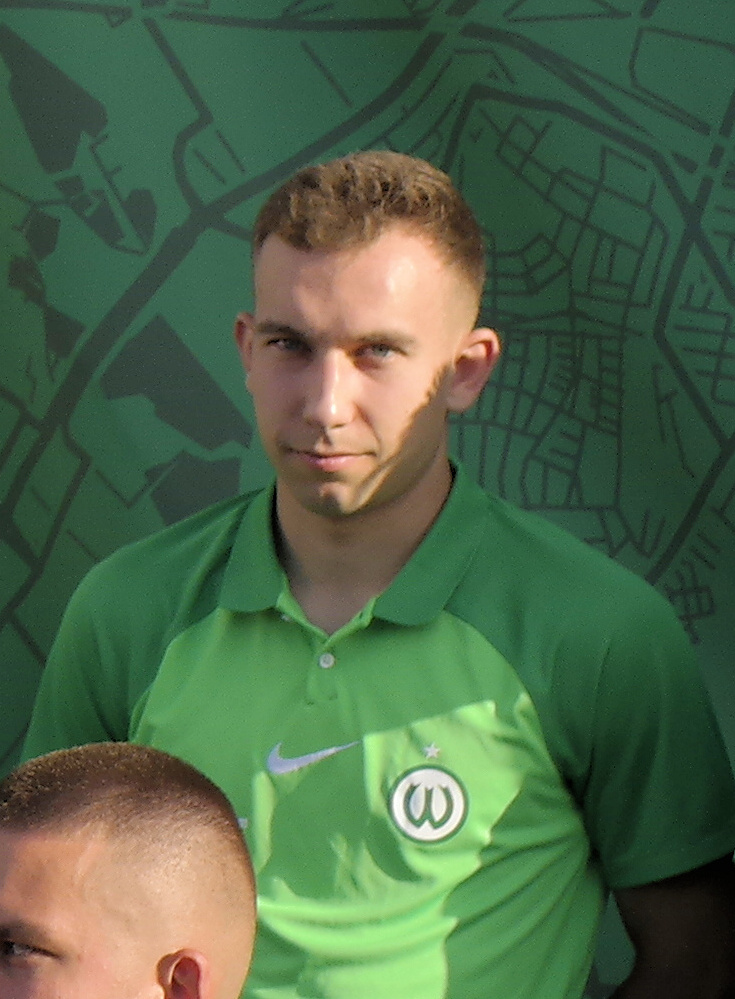
- Matuszewski with Warta Poznań in 2023

Personal information
- Full name: Konrad Matuszewski
- Date of birth: 4 October 2001 (age 25)
- Place of birth: Włoszczowa, Poland
- Height: 1.82 m (6 ft 0 in)
- Position: Left-back

Team information
- Current team: Korona Kielce
- Number: 11

Youth career
- Deko Włoszczowa
- 2011–2014: Hetman Włoszczowa
- 2014–2018: Legia Warsaw

Senior career*
Years	Team	Apps	(Gls)
2018–2021	Legia Warsaw II	47	(0)
2019–2020	→ Wigry Suwałki (loan)	25	(0)
2020–2021	→ Odra Opole (loan)	28	(0)
2021–2024	Warta Poznań	85	(2)
2024–	Korona Kielce	49	(2)
2025	Korona Kielce II	1	(0)

International career
2015–2016	Poland U15	2	(0)
2018	Poland U18	1	(0)
2019	Poland U19	1	(0)
2021	Poland U20	1	(0)
- * Club domestic league appearances and goals as of 21:12, 29 May 2026 (UTC)

Konrad Matuszewski (born 4 October 2001) is a Polish professional footballer who plays as a left-back for Ekstraklasa club Korona Kielce.

== Club career ==
On 15 July 2021, he joined Ekstraklasa side Warta Poznań on a three-year deal.

On 22 June 2024, Matuszewski joined another top-flight outfit Korona Kielce on a one-year contract, with an option for another 12 months. On 31 March 2025, Korona exercised their option to keep Matuszewski at the club for another year.

== Honours ==
Legia Warsaw II

- Polish Cup (Masovia regionals): 2018–19
