= Kamil Kuzera =

Polish footballer

Personal information
- Full name: Kamil Kuzera
- Date of birth: 11 March 1983 (age 43)
- Place of birth: Kielce, Poland
- Height: 1.81 m (5 ft 11 in)
- Position: Defender

Youth career
- 1993–1997: Korona Kielce
- 1997–1998: GKS Nowiny
- 1998: Korona Kielce
- 1999–2000: Wisła Kraków

Senior career*
Years	Team	Apps	(Gls)
1999–2003	Wisła Kraków II		
2001–2006	Wisła Kraków	15	(0)
2003–2004	→ Korona Kielce (loan)	22	(3)
2004	→ Górnik Zabrze (loan)	9	(0)
2005–2006	→ Widzew Łódź (loan)	26	(2)
2006–2008	Polonia Warsaw	25	(2)
2009–2015	Korona Kielce	77	(2)

International career
1999	Poland U17	4	(0)
2001–2005	Poland U21	7	(0)

Managerial career
- 2021: Korona Kielce (caretaker)
- 2021: Korona Kielce (caretaker)
- 2022–2024: Korona Kielce
- 2026: Resovia
- * Club domestic league appearances and goals

Kamil Kuzera (born 11 March 1983) is a Polish professional football manager and former player who played as a defender. He was most recently in charge of II liga club Resovia.

== Managerial statistics ==
As of match played 11 September 2026

Managerial record by team and tenure
Team	From	To	Record							
Team	From	To	G	W	D	L	GF	GA	GD	Win %
Korona Kielce (caretaker)	12 March 2021	16 April 2021	4	3	1	0	3	0	+3	75.00
Korona Kielce (caretaker)	29 November 2021	17 December 2021	2	1	0	1	3	2	+1	50.00
Korona Kielce	29 October 2022	31 July 2024	57	19	18	20	71	76	−5	33.33
Resovia	21 April 2026	12 September 2026	18	4	6	8	20	28	−8	22.22
Total			81	27	25	29	97	106	−9	33.33

== Honours ==
=== Player ===
Wisła Kraków

- Ekstraklasa: 2002–03, 2004–05
- Polish Cup: 2001–02, 2002–03
- Polish League Cup: 2000–01

Korona Kielce

- III liga, group IV: 2003–04

Widzew Łódź

- II liga: 2005–06
