= Gracjan Jaroch =

Polish footballer (born 1998)

Personal information
- Full name: Gracjan Jaroch
- Date of birth: 15 April 1998 (age 28)
- Place of birth: Przemyśl, Poland
- Height: 1.71 m (5 ft 7 in)
- Positions: Attacking midfielder; forward

Team information
- Current team: Resovia
- Number: 25

Youth career
- Polonia Przemyśl
- Pogoń Szczecin

Senior career*
Years	Team	Apps	(Gls)
2014–2016	Pogoń Szczecin II	25	(7)
2016–2019	Pogoń Szczecin	0	(0)
2017	→ Miedź Legnica (loan)	1	(0)
2017	→ Miedź Legnica II (loan)	8	(0)
2018	→ Błękitni Stargard (loan)	15	(2)
2018–2019	→ Bytovia Bytów (loan)	34	(2)
2019–2021	Warta Poznań	46	(8)
2021–2023	GKS Tychy	41	(3)
2023	Skra Częstochowa	14	(0)
2024–	Resovia	73	(8)
- * Club domestic league appearances and goals as of 19:34, 9 June 2026 (UTC)

Gracjan Jaroch (born 15 April 1998) is a Polish professional footballer who plays as an attacking midfielder or forward for II liga club Resovia.
