= TSV Helgoland 1897 =

German football club

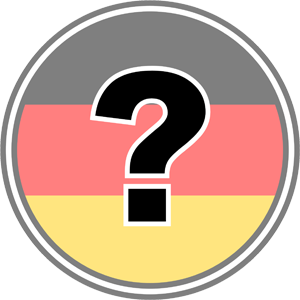
- Full name: Tempelhofer Spielvereinigung 1897 Helgoland e.V.
- Founded: 1897
- Dissolved: 2016
Home colours	Away colours

TSV Helgoland 1897 was a German association football club from the Tempelhof district of the city of Berlin. It was established 5 September 1897 as Berliner Thor- und Fußball-Club 1897 Helgoland and played first division football in the Oberliga Berlin in 1901–02 and 1906–07.

== History ==
The club's name and colours come from the North Sea island of Helgoland and have an unusual history. After being captured in 1807 by the British Navy during the Napoleonic Wars, the island was eventually ceded to Britain by Denmark in 1814. In 1890, a treaty between Germany and Britain involving mostly territorial interests in Africa saw Germany acquire the strategic islands in exchange for its Zanzibar colony. In a burst of patriotic fervour, not one, but two new football clubs bearing the name "Helgoland" were formed in Berlin unawares of one another. Eventually a match was arranged between the two like-named sides and it was agreed that the loser would disband, while the winner would keep the name. After two draws, Tempelhofer Spielvereinigung Helgoland 1897 emerged victorious.

TuFC also fielded a cricket team in its earliest years. Thorball or torball was a German word in use in the 1890s and early 1900s for the sport of cricket. Several early clubs playing the new "English" games of football, rugby, and cricket incorporated it into their name. The term never caught on and did not enter into common usage, soon being abandoned by sports clubs. Today torball may refer to a form of football played by the blind or vision-impaired.

On 21 February 1926, Helgoland merged with Spielvereinigung Tempelhof 1906 to create Tempelhofer Spielvereinigung 1897 Helgoland. TSV was itself the product of an earlier 1924 merger between Tempelhofer SV 1923 and Tempelhofer Fußballklub Borussia 1906. From 1926 to 1930, the club also had a boxing department.

Helgoland disappeared in the middle of World War II on 6 April 1941, but was re-established after the conflict on 29 October 1949.

On 1 July 2016, Helgoland merged with Mariendorfer SV to become TSV Mariendorf. These clubs last played in Berlin's Bezirksliga (VIII) and Landesliga (VII) respectively.
