= Blau-Weiss Wiehre Freiburg =

German sports club

BW Wiehre
- Full name: SV Blau-Weiss Wiehre Freiburg e.V.
- Founded: 1911; 114 years ago
- League: Kreisliga A Freiburg 2 (IX)
- 2022–23: Kreisliga A Freiburg 2, 9th of 17
Home colours	Away colours

SV Blau-Weiss Wiehre Freiburg is a German sports club located in the Wiehre district in the south of Freiburg, Baden-Württemberg. The club was formed in 1994 out of the merger of SpVgg Wiehre 04 and Blau-Weiss Freiburg. In addition to fielding an association football club the sports club has departments for table tennis, bowling, and hiking.

== History ==
The earliest origins of today's club go back to the founding of predecessor sides FC Germania Freiburg and FC Viktora Freiburg in 1904. These two clubs united in 1919 to create SpVgg Freiburg, who spent three seasons in the tier-one Bezirksliga Baden and in 1933 FV Wiehre joined the combined side which became SpVgg Wiehre 04. The club archived to play for one season in the Gauliga Baden in 1943–44, before the league was dissolved. In the aftermath of World War II Allied occupation authorities ordered the dissolution of all organizations, including sports and football clubs. Wiehre was re-established as ASV Freiburg and played under that name until 1964 when they resumed the use of the name SpVgg Wiehre 04.

The other thread in the history of the modern club begins with the founding of Blau-Weiss Freiburg in 1911 as the football department of Athletik SV Freiburg-Haslach. The football team went through a succession of name changes playing as SV Freiburg-Haslach (1918), Haslacher SV (1922), and FC Kickers Haslach (1928) before finally merging with FC Phönix Freiburg in 1930 to form Freiburger Kickers. Blau-Weiss was also dissolved after the war and re-formed in 1946 as Blau-Weiss Freiburg.

The club plays in the Kreisliga Freiburg and currently has a facility sharing arrangement with Freiburger FC. In 2011, the side was relegated from the Kreisliga A to the tier ten Kreisliga B, in a season that saw the team lose 26 of its 30-season games.

The club recovered, winning promotion back to the Kreisliga A in 2013 but being relegated again in 2016.
