= Mariendorfer SV =

German football club

- Full name: Mariendorfer Sport Verein 1906 e.V.
- Founded: 1906
- Dissolved: 2016
- Ground: Volkspark Mariendorf
- Capacity: 15,000
Home colours	Away colours

Mariendorfer SV was a German association football club based in the Mariendorf district of Berlin.

== History ==
The roots of the club go back to the predecessor sides Mariendorfer Ballspiel Club 1906 and Sportclub Krampe 1926, which was organized by a group of former Preussen Berlin players. Both were small local clubs playing in the lower tier city leagues.

In the aftermath of World War II occupying Allied authorities ordered the dissolution of all organizations, including sports and football clubs. In the fall of 1945 the sports association SG Mariendorf was organized by members of several of the district's former clubs including MBC, Krampe, and SpVgg Blau-Weiß 1890 Berlin. The combined side played in the first division Stadtliga or Oberliga Berlin until relegated in 1948 and the next year SGM broke up as the old clubs that made up the association were re-constituted. SpVgg Blau-Weiß 1890 Berlin eventually went on to play professional football, while the other clubs stayed in local amateur ball. Krampe was renamed Sport Club Mariendorf in 1951 and in 1985 SCM and MBC merged to form the present day side Mariendorfer Sport Verein 1906.

In July 2016, MSV merged with Helgoland Berlin and became TSV Mariendorf.
