= Christine Paul =

German footballer

Personal information
- Date of birth: 21 January 1965 (age 61)
- Position: Midfielder

Senior career*
| Years | Team | Apps | (Gls) |
- FC Wacker München

International career^{‡}
| | Germany | 7 | |
- * Club domestic league appearances and goals ‡ National team caps and goals as of 16 November 1991 (before the 1991 FIFA Women's World Cup)

Christine Paul (born 21 January 1965) is a German women's international footballer who plays as a midfielder. She is a member of the Germany women's national football team. She was part of the team at the 1991 FIFA Women's World Cup. On club level she plays for FC Wacker München in Germany.
