= Korona Kielce =

- Full name: Korona Spółka Akcyjna
- Nicknames: Scyzory (The Buck-Knives); Złocisto-Krwiści (The Golden-Blooded)
- Founded: 10 July 1973; 53 years ago
- Ground: Kielce Municipal Stadium
- Capacity: 15,700
- Owner(s): Korona 4ever (99%); Kielce (1%)
- Chairman: Leszek Czarny
- Manager: Robert Kolendowicz
- League: Ekstraklasa
- 2025–26: Ekstraklasa, 11th of 18
- Website: korona-kielce.pl
Home colours	Away colours

Korona Kielce (Polish pronunciation: [kɔˈrɔna ˈkʲɛlt͡sɛ], Korona – Crown – symbol of club and city, Kielce – name of city where club is based) is a Polish professional football club based in Kielce, competing in Ekstraklasa in the 2025–26 season. From 2002 to 2008, the club belonged to a Polish holding company Kolporter Holding and achieved its greatest success – winning promotion to the top tier in 2005. Since then, Korona has spent 17 seasons in the Polish football top level (as of 2024–25). In the 2006–07 season, Korona played in the final of the Polish Cup.

== Honours ==
=== League ===
- Ekstraklasa
  - Fifth place: 2011–12, 2016–17
- I liga
  - Champions: 2004–05
- II liga (group IV)
  - Champions: 1989–90, 1996–97, 2003–04

=== Cup ===
- Polish Cup
  - Runners-up: 2006–07
  - Semi-finalists: 2006–07, 2018–19
- Ekstraklasa Cup
  - Quarter-finalists: 2007–08

=== Youth teams ===
- Polish U-19 Championship
  - Champions: 2009, 2019
  - Runners-up: 1997

== History ==
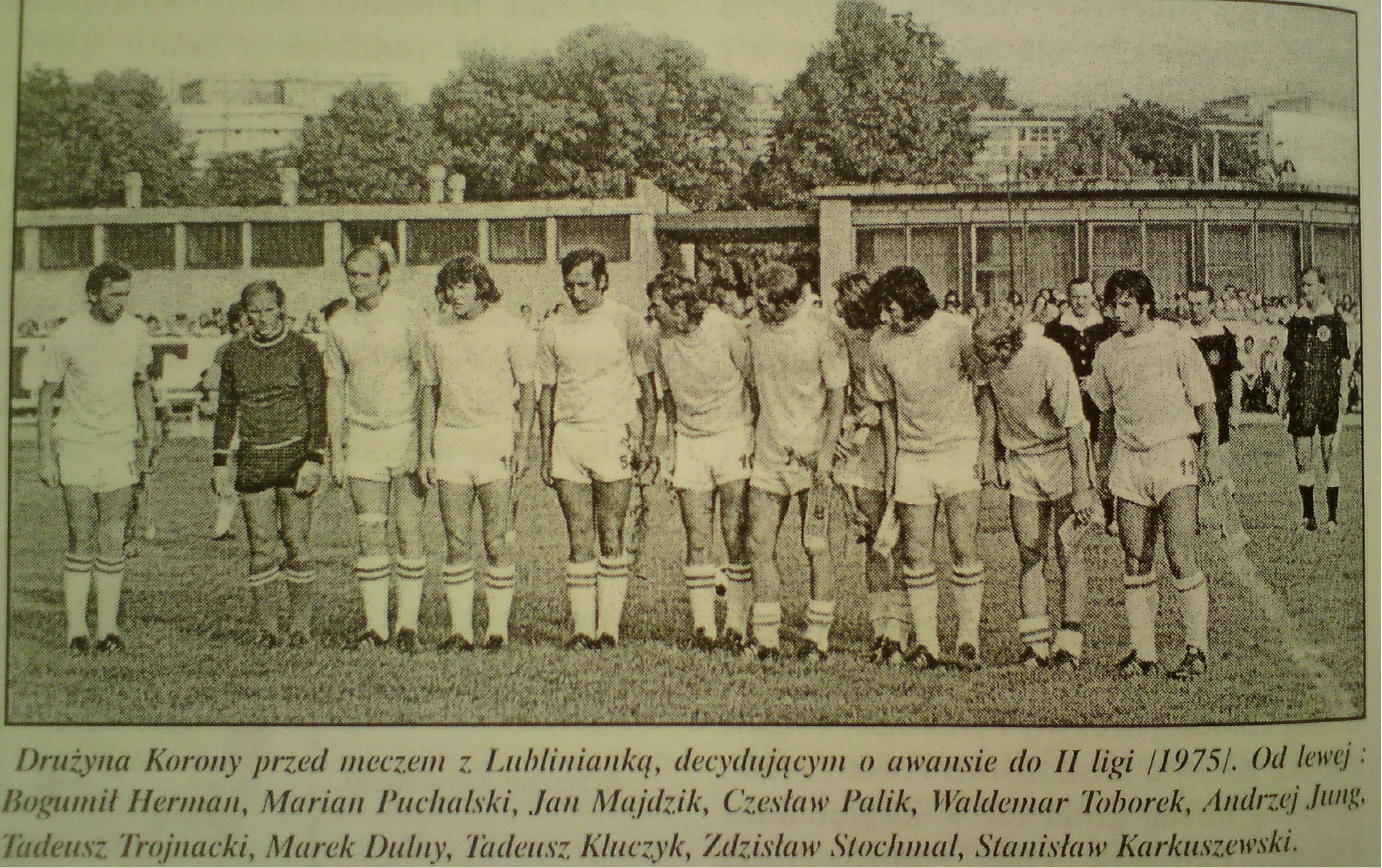
Korona Kielce team before the decisive match for promotion to the II liga against KS Lublinianka in 1975

The club was founded in 1973 after the union of two clubs from Kielce – Iskra and SHL. The new club got its first promotion to the Polish 2nd league in 1975. Unfortunately, the team did not play very well and was soon relegated. The next promotion was in 1982. Korona played in the 2nd league until 1990 when it was once again relegated. 1996 brought several changes. Nida Gips from Gacki became the new sponsor and the club's name changed to Miejski Klub Sportowy Sekcja Futbolowa Korona. During the 1998–99 season, Korona again played in the 2nd league but dropped down at the end of the season. In 2000 Korona merged with another club from Kielce – Błękitni Kielce and was renamed to Kielecki Klub Piłkarski Korona.

In 2002, the golden era for Korona had begun. Kolporter became the new sponsor, Krzysztof Klicki the new chairman, and the club's name changed to Kielecki Klub Piłkarski Kolporter Korona. In 2003, the team was again renamed, this time to Sportowa Spólka Akcyjna Kolporter Korona. In 2005 Korona won the 2nd league and for the first time in the club's history was promoted to the Polish premier league.

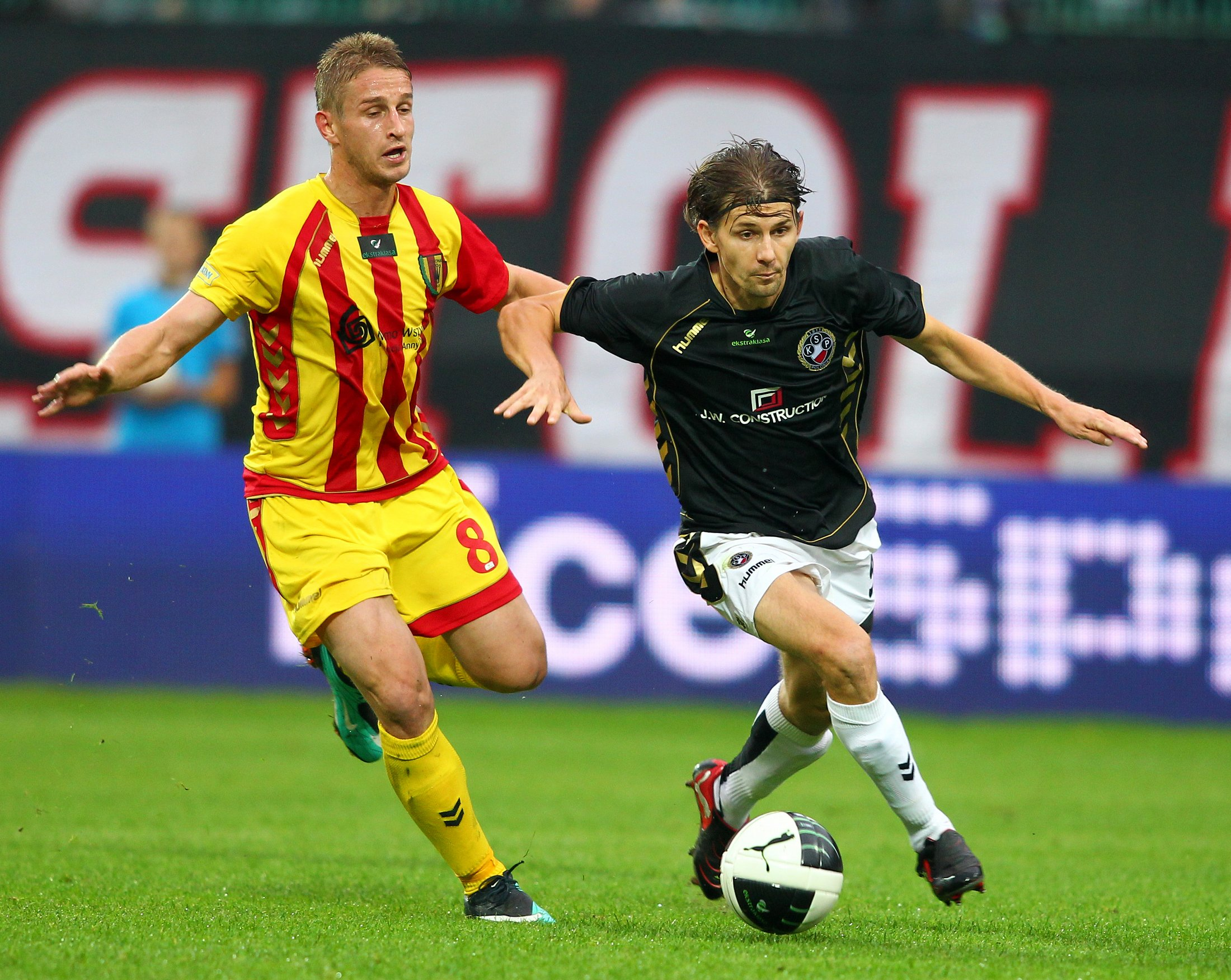
Away game with Polonia Warsaw played in the 2010–11 Ekstraklasa

Korona's first match in the Ekstraklasa was against Cracovia and the final score was 0–0. Korona ended the 2005–06 season fifth in the league table. Prior to the 2006–07 season, at a meeting with supporters, the chairman announced that club would revert to its historical coat of arms. Korona's second season in the Ekstraklasa started off strongly with an away win against Arka Gdynia (3–0). 20 September 2006 was a significant one in Korona's history. After an away victory against Odra Wodzisław Śląski, the club climbed to the top of the league table for the first time in its history although it ended the 2006–07 season in 7th place. Its third and final season in the top division was 2007–08, placing 6th but being relegated for its involvement in match-fixing in the 2003–04 season. In August 2008, Klicki sold the club to the city of Kielce for a nominal fee.

After one year, on 14 July 2009, Korona Kielce was promoted to the Ekstraklasa. In the 2019–20 season, Korona finished in 15th place and were relegated back to I liga. On 29 May 2022 Korona returned to the Ekstraklasa following a 3–2 win over Chrobry Głogów in the promotion play-off final after the winning goal scored in the final minutes of extra time.

== Stadium ==
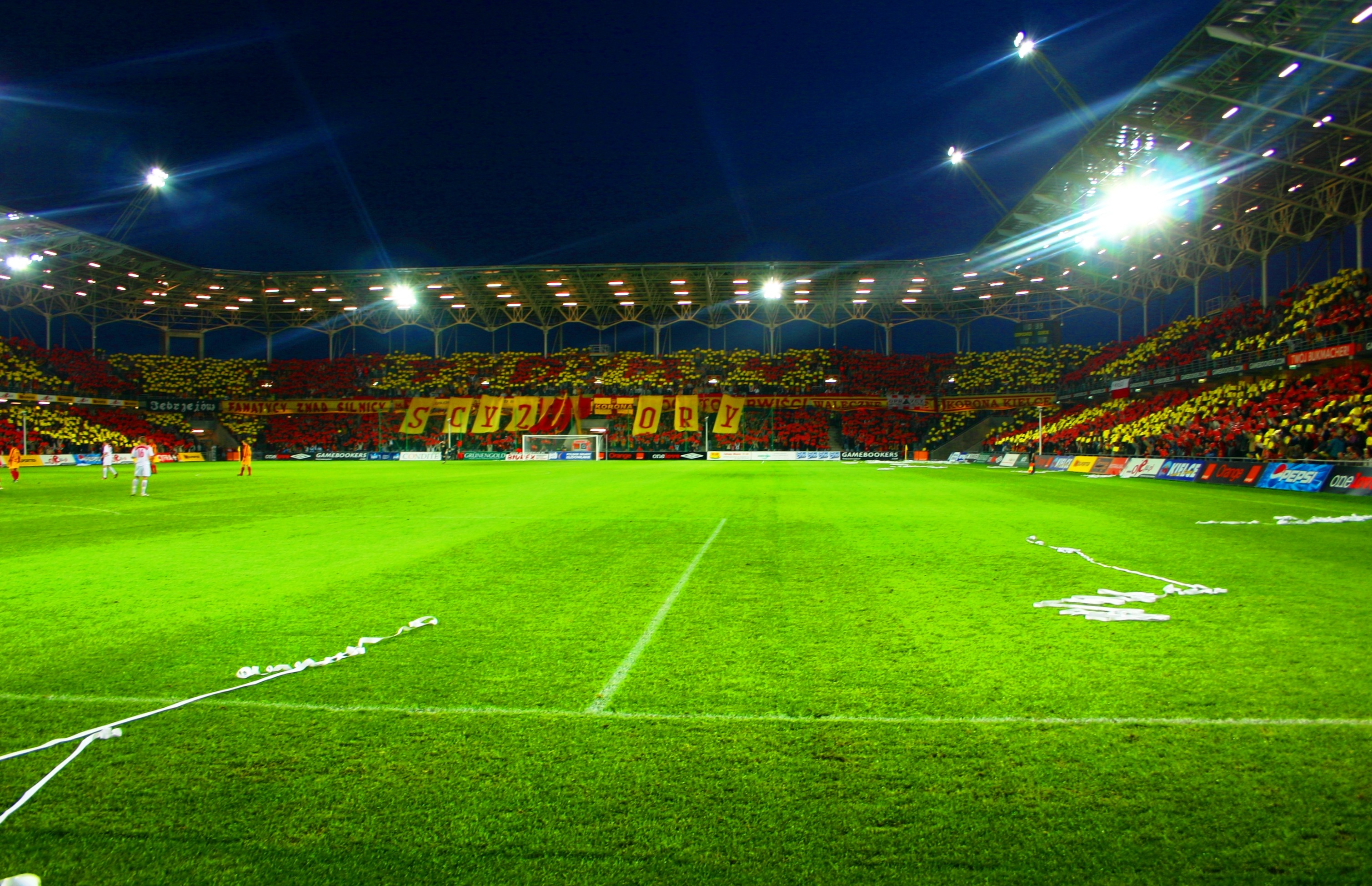
Stadium of Korona Kielce

In response to Korona's successes and the club owner, Krzysztof Klicki's, affirmation that the club would play in the premier league and battle for European cups, Kielce municipal authorities approved the construction of a new stadium. Unfortunately, the stadium turned out to be much too small. Because of this the club played its first round in the highest division at its old stadium (currently used by reserves and youth teams) to permit further work on the new facility.

Only eighteen months after the start of the building project, the keys of the new stadium were officially handed to the club. The first premier league match was played on 1 April 2006 against Zagłębie Lubin.

The Korona stadium, although it stands on the same site as an earlier stadium, is an entirely new facility, built according to UEFA recommendations and modern design ideas. In this way it differs from most other football stadiums in Poland which were built during the communist era or earlier and only slightly modernized to meet basic UEFA standards.

Kielce stadium can seat 15,550 fans, however, due to Polish regulations, which require a buffer zone between local fans and the visitors section, league matches can only accommodate 13,823 Korona fans and 777 visiting fans. However, on one occasion the stadium was full to capacity during a league match. This occurred during the 2006–07 season when fans of visiting club Legia Warsaw were prohibited from entering due to the vast number of their 'red brigade' supporters who made the trip down to watch their club in Kielce.

Pitch dimensions are 105 x 68 m, and the entire surface is heated. Automatic sprinklers water the pitch in between match days. Kielce stadium has a complete system of monitoring, which could serve as a model for other Polish stadiums. Korona's stadium is also considered by the Polish Football Association for international games.

Since 2006, when the club moved to the most modern stadium in Poland, it often had one of the highest attendance statistics in the Polish league, although these numbers have declined since the club's relegation at the end of the 2007–08 season.

== Club crest ==
A new club crest was introduced in 2002, featuring a redesigned coat of arms. However, many fans were disappointed by the removal of the beloved black crown from the emblem.

Before the 2006–07 season, the chairman announced in a meeting with supporters that the club would return to the historical coat of arms. Thanks to the fans and good will of the chairman, Korona again has the crown in her coat of arms.

== Ownership ==
In April 2017, former German international footballer Dieter Burdenski became the majority owner of the club after purchasing 72% of the club shares, and subsequently signed his son Fabian in June that year. In 2020, the city of Kielce acquired Burdenski's shares and became the sole owner of the club.

In March 2025, Kielce sold 99% of its shares to a private limited company Korona 4ever, run by local businessman Łukasz Maciejczyk, and pledged to provide the club with 2.3 million PLN annually until 2030.

== Supporters ==
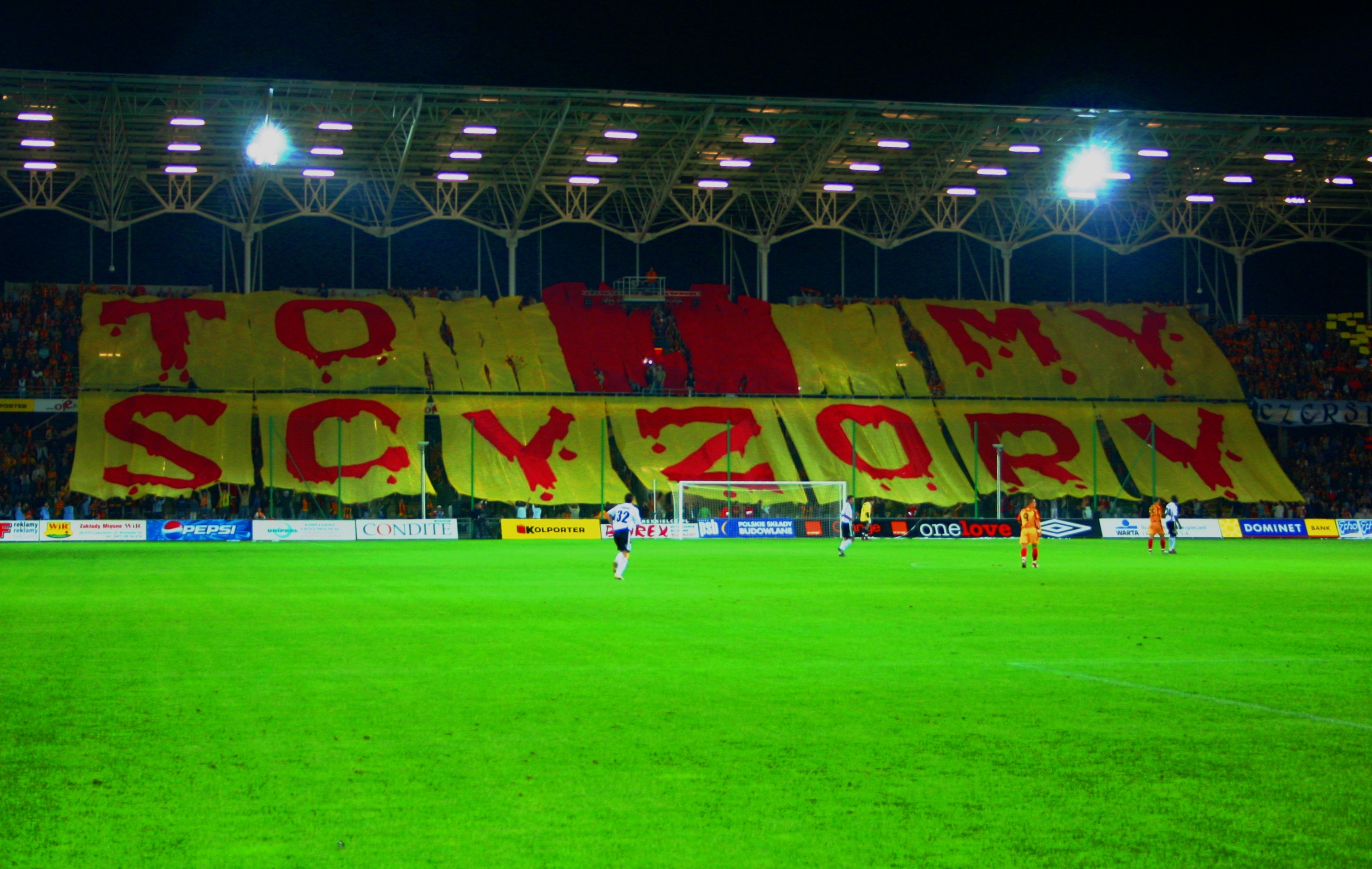
"We are the Buck-Knives"

Supporters of Korona are some of the most enthusiastic in the Ekstraklasa and have received many awards for their artistic match 'frames'. In the spring round of 2006–07, Korona Kielce fans were awarded 5 times in 8 matches for their superb 'frames'.

Korona supporters' tireless cheering for their team often helps their team to victories. The most faithful fans are seated in the Młyn (transl. the Mill) which contains 500 – 2,000 people.

On 14 June 2006, the Stowarzyszenie Kibiców Korony Kielce "Złocisto-Krwiści" (transl. Korona Kielce Supporters Association "Golden-Blooded") was officially registered at a Kielce court. Official appointing of Korona Kielce fans had become a fact. This association brings together representatives of various Korona supporters groups.

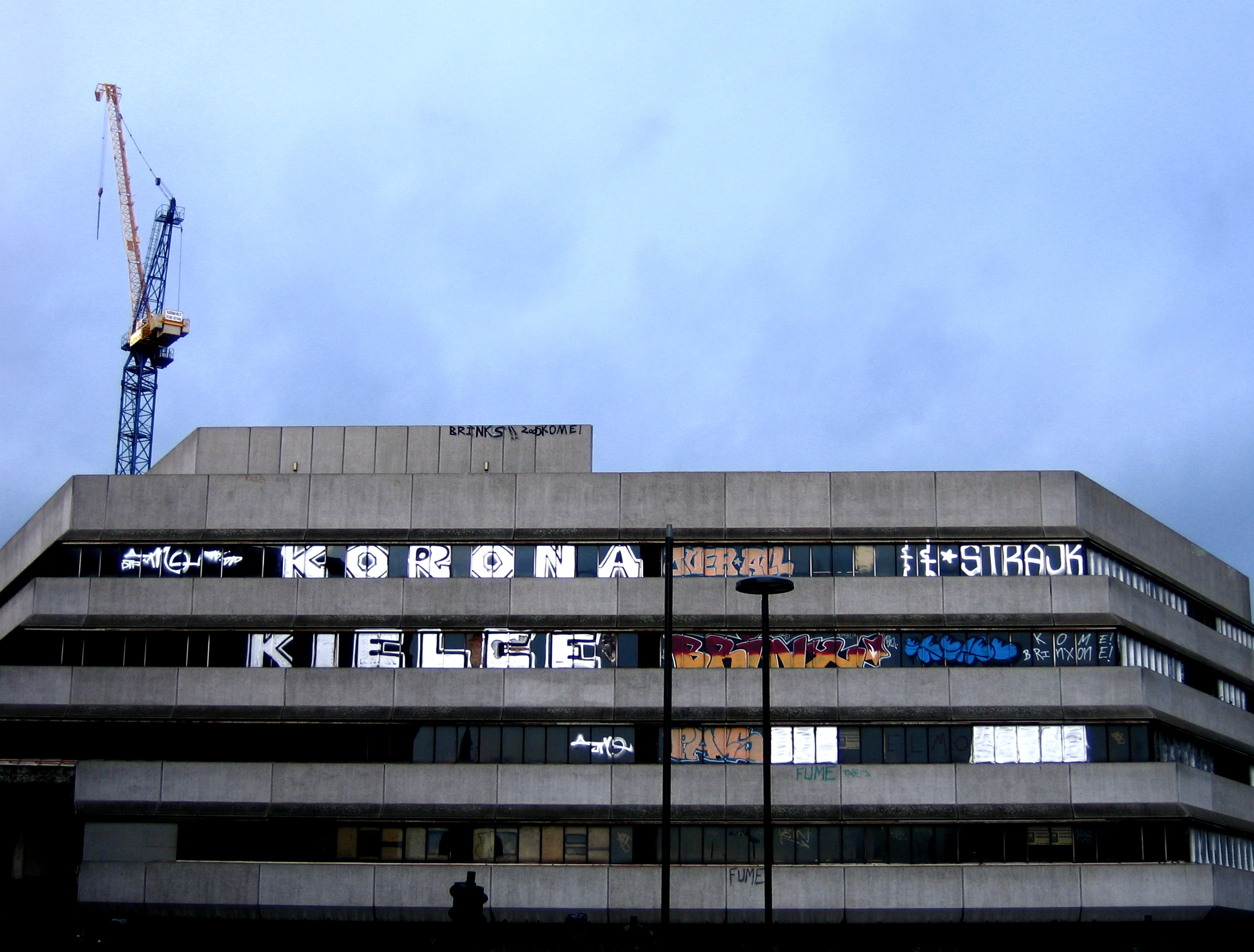
Graffiti produced by Strajk and DTP (Grafitti crews from Kielce) on the abandoned County Hall Island Block in London, 2006

The association is a partner for the club and many institutions, which it wants to cooperate with. The fans are invaluable in the creation of memorable football events, and the association has an important role in increasing fan input on football life in Korona. The most important role of the association however is to improve the quality of support.

The association also organizes special trains and coaches for fans for away matches. It also organizes events promoting the Club such as "Golden-bloody stadium in Kielce", "Small toy – children's benefit" (fans donated toys to an orphanage), "Action Banner" (a lot of flags and banners were sewed). In short, the association has introduced a new supporting style at Korona matches which will attract even more fans to the stadium on Ściegiennego street.

Their biggest rivals are KSZO Ostrowiec Świętokrzyski with whom they contest the Holy Cross Province derby. Other fierce rivals are Radomiak Radom and Wisła Kraków.

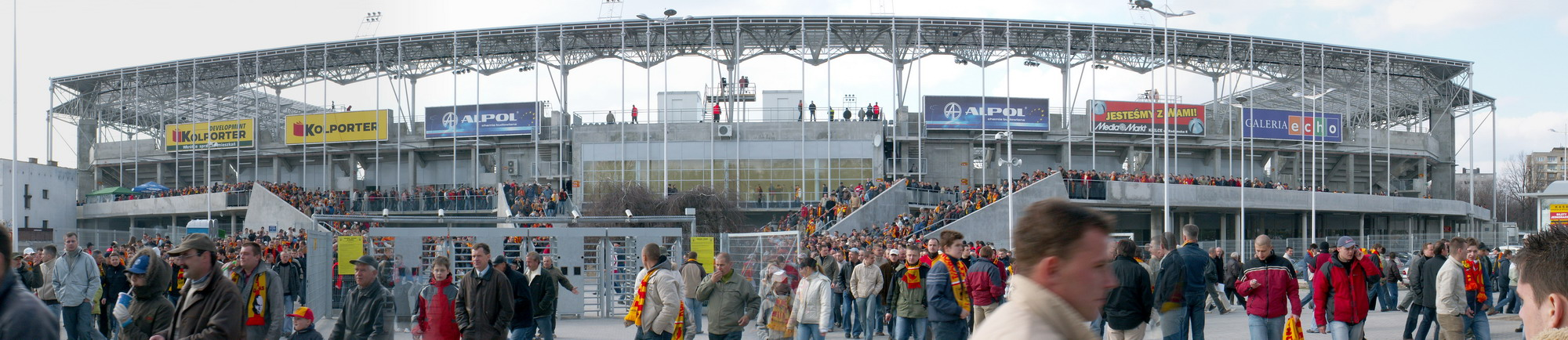
After a match...

== Korona Kielce II ==
The club operates a reserve team.

== Season to season ==
Season	Tier	Place
1973–74	3	4th
1974–75	3	1st
1975–76	2	15th
1976–77	3	6th
1977–78	3	10th
1978–79	3	8th
1979–80	3	4th
1980–81	3	4th
1981–82	3	2nd
1982–83	2	9th
1983–84	2	9th
1984–85	2	8th
1985–86	2	10th
1986–87	2	13th
1987–88	3	2nd
1988–89	3	4th
1989–90	3	1st
1990–91	2	17th

Season	Tier	Place
1991–92	2	13th
1992–93	2	18th
1993–94	3	7th
1994–95	3	3rd
1995–96	3	4th
1996–97	3	1st
1997–98	2	8th
1998–99	2	6th
1999–2000	2	23rd
2000–01	3	13th
2001–02	3	7th
2002–03	3	2nd
2003–04	3	1st
2004–05	2	1st
2005–06	1	5th
2006–07	1	7th
2007–08	1	6th
2008–09	2	3rd

Season	Tier	Place
2009–10	1	6th
2010–11	1	13th
2011–12	1	5th
2012–13	1	11th
2013–14	1	13th
2014–15	1	11th
2015–16	1	12th
2016–17	1	5th
2017–18	1	8th
2018–19	1	10th
2019–20	1	15th
2020–21	2	12th
2021–22	2	4th
2022–23	1	13th
2023–24	1	14th
2024–25	1	11th
2025–26	1	11th

== Players ==
=== Current squad ===
As of 9 September 2026

Note: Flags indicate national team as defined under FIFA eligibility rules; some limited exceptions apply. Players may hold more than one non-FIFA nationality.

No.	Pos.	Nation	Player
1	GK	POL	Xavier Dziekoński
2	DF	POL	Ariel Mosór
6	DF	POL	Marcel Pięczek
7	MF	POL	Dawid Błanik (3rd captain)
8	MF	BEL	Martin Remacle
9	FW	CRO	Stjepan Davidović
10	MF	ESP	Nono (vice-captain)
11	DF	POL	Konrad Matuszewski
12	GK	POL	Michał Mikielewicz
14	FW	POL	Mariusz Stępiński (captain)
15	MF	POL	Kornel Toboła
18	MF	CZE	Patrik Hellebrand
19	MF	POL	Michael Ameyaw
20	MF	POL	Kacper Minuczyc
21	DF	POL	Konrad Ciszek

No.	Pos.	Nation	Player
22	MF	GER	Morgan Faßbender
23	DF	MNE	Slobodan Rubežić
24	DF	POL	Bartłomiej Smolarczyk
26	DF	POL	Igor Chmielewski
30	MF	COL	Camilo Mena (on loan from Lechia Gdańsk)
32	MF	CZE	Ondřej Lingr
35	MF	POL	Kamil Jakubczyk
37	DF	POL	Hubert Zwoźny
44	DF	CYP	Konstantinos Sotiriou
67	DF	POL	Norbert Barczak
71	MF	POL	Wiktor Długosz
86	MF	SWE	Simon Gustafson
87	GK	POL	Rafał Mamla
97	GK	POL	Franciszek Panek
99	FW	POL	Daniel Bąk

=== Out on loan ===
Note: Flags indicate national team as defined under FIFA eligibility rules; some limited exceptions apply. Players may hold more than one non-FIFA nationality.

No.	Pos.	Nation	Player
16	MF	POL	Jakub Kowalski (at Arka Gdynia until 30 June 2027)
22	GK	POL	Michał Niedbała (at Wiślanie Skawina until 30 June 2027)

No.	Pos.	Nation	Player
70	FW	ESP	Antoñín (at Hércules until 30 June 2027)
77	MF	POL	Adam Chojecki (at Resovia until 30 June 2027)

=== Notable players ===
The following players received international caps for their respective countries. Players whose name is listed in bold represented their countries while playing for Korona Kielce.

Poland

- (Poland) Michael Ameyaw (2026–)
- (Poland) **Grzegorz Bonin** (2005–08)
- (Poland) Piotr Celeban (2007–08)
- (Poland) **Radosław Cierzniak** (2007–10)
- (Poland) **Paweł Golański** (2005–07) (2010–15)
- (Poland) Artur Jędrzejczyk (2010)
- (Poland) **Marcin Kaczmarek** (2005–08)
- (Poland) Arkadiusz Kaliszan (2004–06)
- (Poland) **Jacek Kiełb** (2006–10, 2011–12, 2013–15, 2016–18, 2020–23)
- (Poland) **Wojciech Kowalewski** (2007–08)
- (Poland) **Marcin Kuś** (2007–08)
- (Poland) **Andrzej Niedzielan** (2010–11)
- (Poland) **Grzegorz Piechna** (2004–06)
- (Poland) Mariusz Stępiński (2026–)
- (Poland) Piotr Świerczewski (2007–08)
- (Poland) Maciej Wilusz (2015)
- (Poland) Łukasz Załuska (2004–07)
- (Poland) Marcin Żewłakow (2012–13)
- (Poland) Michał Żyro (2019–20)

Belarus

- (Belarus) **Yevgeny Shikavka** (2022–25)
- (Belarus) Dzmitry Verkhawtsow (2016)

Bosnia and Herzegovina

- (Bosnia and Herzegovina) Vlastimir Jovanović (2010–16)
- (Bosnia and Herzegovina) **Adnan Kovačević** (2017–20)

Bulgaria

- (Bulgaria) **Iliyan Mitsanski** (2007, 2017)
- (Bulgaria) **Vladimir Nikolov** (2025–26)
- (Bulgaria) **Viktor Popov** (2025–26)

Canada

- (Canada) **Milan Borjan** (2017)
- (Canada) Marcus Godinho (2023–25)
- (Canada) **Charlie Trafford** (2015–17)
- (Canada) **Dominick Zator** (2023–25)

Colombia

- (Colombia) **Camilo Mena** (2026–)

Costa Rica

- (Costa Rica) Felicio Brown Forbes (2018–19)

Cyprus

- (Cyprus) **Konstantinos Sotiriou** (2025–)

Czech Republic

- (Czech Republic) Patrik Hellebrand (2026–)
- (Czech Republic) **Ondřej Lingr** (2026–)
- (Czech Republic) Michal Papadopoulos (2019–20)

Estonia

- (Estonia) **Ken Kallaste** (2016–19)
- (Estonia) **Sander Puri** (2011)

Finland

- (Finland) Petteri Forsell (2020, 2024)

France

- (France) Olivier Kapo (2014–15)

Georgia

- (Georgia (country)) **Vato Arveladze** (2018–20)
- (Georgia (country)) **Nika Kacharava** (2017–18)

Israel

- (Israel) **Yoav Hofmayster** (2023–25)

Kazakhstan

- (Kazakhstan) **Sergei Khizhnichenko** (2014)

Latvia

- (Latvia) **Aleksandrs Fertovs** (2015–16)
- (Latvia) **Vladislavs Gabovs** (2015–17)

Lithuania

- (Lithuania) **Vytautas Černiauskas** (2014–15)
- (Lithuania) **Andrius Skerla** (2007–08)

Moldova

- (Moldova) Anatolie Doroș (2005–06)

Montenegro

- (Montenegro) **Saša Balić** (2022–23)
- (Montenegro) **Slobodan Rubežić** (2025–)

New Zealand

- (New Zealand) Themistoklis Tzimopoulos (2019–21)

Senegal

- (Senegal) **Elhadji Pape Diaw** (2016–19)

Serbia

- (Serbia) Nemanja Miletić (2019–20)

Slovakia

- (Slovakia) Erik Pačinda (2019–20)

Slovenia

- (Slovenia) Goran Cvijanović (2017–18)
- (Slovenia) **Tamar Svetlin** (2025–26)

Sweden

- (Sweden) Simon Gustafson (2026–)

== Managers ==
- (Poland) Zbigniew Pawlak (1973)
- (Poland) Bogumił Gozdur (1973–77)
- (Poland) Zbigniew Lepczyk (1978)
- (Poland) Marian Szczechowicz (1979)
- (Poland) Wojciech Niedźwiedzki (1979–80)
- (Poland) Antoni Hermanowicz (1980–83)
- (Poland) Józef Golla (1983–84)
- (Poland) Czesław Palik (1 July 1984 – 30 June 1985)
- (Poland) Czesław Fudalej (1985)
- (Poland) Witold Sokołowski (1986)
- (Poland) Antoni Hermanowicz (1986)
- (Poland) Bogumił Gozdur (1986)
- (Poland) Antoni Hermanowicz (1987–88)
- (Poland) Czesław Palik (1 July 1988 – 31 December 1991)
- (Ukraine) Volodymyr Bulhakov (1992)
- (Poland) Marian Puchalski (1993)
- (Poland) Antoni Hermanowicz (1993)
- (Poland) Marek Parzyszek (1994)
- (Poland) Czesław Palik (1 July 1994 – 30 June 1996)
- (Poland) Włodzimierz Gąsior (1 July 1996 – 30 June 1999)
- (Poland) Stanisław Gielarek (1999)
- (Poland) Antoni Hermanowicz (2000)
- (Poland) Jacek Zieliński I (1 July 2000 – 20 December 2000)
- (Poland) Czesław Palik (1 January 2001 – 30 June 2001)
- (Poland) Robert Orłowski (1 July 2001 – 2002)
- (Poland) Tomasz Muchiński (2002 – 23 September 2002)
- (Poland) Dariusz Wdowczyk (23 September 2002 – 12 December 2004)
- (Poland) Ryszard Wieczorek (13 December 2004 – 7 May 2007)
- (Poland) Jacek Zieliński II (1 July 2007 – 17 May 2008)
- (Poland) Włodzimierz Gąsior (3 June 2008 – 4 May 2009)
- (Poland) Marek Motyka (18 May 2009 – 23 November 2009)
- (Poland) Marcin Gawron (caretaker) (24 November 2009 – 29 November 2009)
- (Poland) Marcin Sasal (29 November 2009 – 12 May 2011)
- (Poland) Włodzimierz Gąsior (interim) (12 May 2011 – 9 June 2011)
- (Poland) Leszek Ojrzyński (1 July 2011 – 5 August 2013)
- (Poland) Sławomir Grzesik (caretaker) (5 August 2013 – 13 August 2013)
- (Spain) Pacheta (13 August 2013 – June 2014)
- (Poland) Ryszard Tarasiewicz (17 June 2014 – 10 June 2015)
- (Poland) Marcin Brosz (25 June 2015 – 30 June 2016)
- (Poland) Tomasz Wilman (30 June 2016 – 10 November 2016)
- (Poland) Maciej Bartoszek (10 November 2016 – 30 June 2017)
- (Italy) Gino Lettieri (1 July 2017 – 31 August 2019)
- (Poland) Mirosław Smyła (16 September 2019 – 6 March 2020)
- (Poland) Maciej Bartoszek (6 March 2020 – 15 April 2021)
- (Poland) Dominik Nowak (16 April 2021 – 29 November 2021)
- (Poland) Leszek Ojrzyński (17 December 2021 – 29 October 2022)
- (Poland) Kamil Kuzera (29 October 2022 – 31 July 2024)
- (Poland) Mariusz Arczewski (caretaker) (31 July 2024 – 8 August 2024)
- (Poland) Jacek Zieliński I (8 August 2024 – 19 October 2026)
- (Poland) Robert Kolendowicz (20 October 2026 – present)

== See also ==
- Football in Poland
- List of football teams
