= Resovia (sports club) =

CWKS Resovia
- Full name: Civilian-Military Sports Club Resovia (Polish: Cywilno-Wojskowy Klub Sportowy Resovia)
- Founded: 1905
- Based in: Rzeszów, Poland
- Colors

Cywilno-Wojskowy Klub Sportowy Resovia, shortened to CWKS Resovia, often referred to simply as Resovia, is a Polish multisport club, based in Rzeszów, Poland.

== History ==
Resovia was officially registered in 1905 in the then Austrian Poland, but the history of the club dates back to several football teams, formed by students of local high schools in 1905–1907. As a result, in different sources the date of the foundation of Resovia is presented as 1905, 1907 and 1910. During World War I, when most of Austrian Galicia was occupied by the Russian Empire, the activities of Resovia were suspended. The organization was recreated in 1919, and in June 1920, first stadium was opened on Krakowska Street.

Resovia was formed as a football club, but in the 1920s, other departments were added (tennis, track and field, cycling). In 1932, volleyball team was formed, later the departments of boxing, table tennis and basketball were added. On February 12, 1933, Resovia was merged with football team of the 17th Infantry Regiment, which was garrisoned in Rzeszow. As a result of the merger, the organization changed its name into Wojskowo-Cywilne Towarzystwo Sportowe (WCTS, Military-Civilian Sports Association) Resovia.

In the 1930s, Resovia was among top teams of the Lwow Regional League (see Lower Level Football Leagues in Interwar Poland). It 1937, it won the regional championship, qualifying to the first round of the Ekstraklasa playoffs, where it faced Unia Lublin, Strzelec Janowa Dolina and Rewera Stanislawow. Resovia finished in the second spot, behind Unia Lublin.

The cooperation with the military ended in 1938, when Resovia received support from Rzeszów branch of the H. Cegielski – Poznań factory (currently: Zelmer Household Appliances). In 1938–1939, Resovia's official name was Sports Club H. Cegielski Poznań Resovia.

== Archery ==
The archery teams, both men's and women's, were several time Polish Champions, dominating the sport for several decades. The women's team has won 12 championships (1961, 1962, 1963, 1965, 1968, 1969, 1970, 1974, 1975, 1978, 1980, 1985), whereas the men have won 9 championships (1961, 1962, 1963, 1965, 1968, 1969, 1970, 1989, 1991).

== Association football ==
=== Men's ===
As of 2021, Resovia football team currently play in I liga.

Among the achievements of Resovia's football team are: Championship of Lwów League (1937), semifinal of the Polish Cup (1980–81), second position in the Second Division (1982–83).

The section also possesses a senior reserve side playing lower down the league pyramid.

=== Women's ===
The club also possesses a women's football team that play in the second tier of Polish football.

== Athletics ==
Among Olympic medalists from Resovia are Bronislaw Bebel, Marek Karbarz, and Wlodzimierz Stefanski. Among World champions are: Katarzyna Wisniowska, Lukasz Kustra, Stanislaw Gosciniak, Marek Karbarz, Wlodzimierz Stefanski and Krzysztof Martens.

== Basketball ==
The basketball section was dominant force in the country in the 70s however since then the section has fallen into relative obscurity.

== Volleyball ==
The men's volleyball team plays in the Polish Volleyball League and is one of the country's strongest sides; they were the Champions of Poland in 1971, 1972, 1974, 1975, 2012, 2013 and 2015.
