= 1. FFC Turbine Potsdam in European football =

German club in European football

This is an article showing the matches of 1. FFC Turbine Potsdam's appearances in UEFA international competitions.

== Overall record ==
| Competition | Stage | Opponent | Result | Scorers | Position |
|---|---|---|---|---|---|
| 2004–05 Women's Cup | First round | (France) Montpellier HSC (Poland) AZS Wrocław (Italy) Torres CF | 6–0; 4–1; 7–5 | Pohlers 3, Mittag, Odebrecht, Omilade; Pohlers 2, Odebrecht, Zietz; Pohlers 3, Wimbersky 2, Hingst, Omilade | 1 / 4 |
| 2004–05 Women's Cup | Quarterfinals | (Russia) Energiya Voronezh | 1–1 4–1 | Wimbersky 2, Becher, Mittag, Odebrecht | |
| 2004–05 Women's Cup | Semifinals | (Norway) Trondheims-Ørn | 4–0 3–1 | Pohlers 3, Hingst 2, Mittag, Wimbersky | |
| 2004–05 Women's Cup | Final | (Sweden) Djurgårdens IF | 2–0 3–1 | Pohlers 3, Mittag, Wimbersky | |
| 2005–06 Women's Cup | First round | (Austria) SV Neulengbach (Netherlands) SV Saestum (France) Montpellier HSC | 12–1; 2–0; 0–0 | Wimbersky 4, Mittag 3, Hingst, I. Kerschowski, Omilade, Carlson, Thomas; Hingst, Wimbersky | 1 / 4 |
| 2005–06 Women's Cup | Quarterfinals | (Iceland) Valur | 8–1 11–1 | Mittag 4, Pohlers 4, Cristiane 3, Wimbersky 3, I. Kerschowski, Omilade, Thomas + 2 o.g. | |
| 2005–06 Women's Cup | Semifinals | (Sweden) Djurgårdens IF | 2–3 5–2 | Pohlers 2, Cristiane, Hingst, Mittag, Podvorica, Zietz | |
| 2005–06 Women's Cup | Final | (Germany) 1.FFC Frankfurt | 0–4 2–3 | Pohlers 2 | |
| 2006–07 Women's Cup | First round | (Belgium) FCL Rapide Wezemaal (Netherlands) SV Saestum (Czech Republic) Sparta Prague | 1–0; 2–2; 4–0 | Pohlers; Pohlers 2 Hingst, Kameraj, I. Kerschowski, Pohlers | 1 / 4 |
| 2006–07 Women's Cup | Quarterfinals | (Denmark) Brøndby IF | 0–3 2–1 | Carlson, Hingst | |
| 2009–10 Champions League | Round of 32 | (Finland) FC Honka | 8–1 8–0 | Mittag 6, Bajramaj 2, Zietz 2, Bagehorn, Draws, Kessler, Odebrecht + 2 o.g. | |
| 2009–10 Champions League | Round of 16 | (Denmark) Brøndby IF | 1–0 4–0 | Kessler 2, Bajramaj, Mittag, Wich | |
| 2009–10 Champions League | Quarterfinals | (Norway) Røa IL | 5–0 5–0 | Kessler 2, Mittag 2, Y. Nagasato 2, Bajramaj, Odebrecht, Peter, Wich | |
| 2009–10 Champions League | Semifinals | (Germany) FCR Duisburg | 0–1 1–0 (PSO: 3–1) | Kemme | |
| 2009–10 Champions League | Final | (France) Olympique Lyonnais | 0–0 (PSO: 7–6) | | |
| 2010–11 Champions League | Round of 32 | (Finland) Åland United | 9–0 6–0 | Mittag 4, Bajramaj 2, Peter 2, Schmidt 2, Demann, Kemme, Kessler, Y. Nagasato, Wesely | |
| 2010–11 Champions League | Round of 16 | (Austria) SV Neulengbach | 7–0 9–0 | Y. Nagasato 4, Mittag 3, Zietz 3, Bajramaj 2, Bagehorn, Kessler, Odebrecht, Wesely | |
| 2010–11 Champions League | Quarterfinals | (France) FCF Juvisy | 3–0 6–2 | I. Kerschowski 2, Y. Nagasato 2, Schmidt 2, Bajramaj, Mittag + 1 o.g. | |
| 2010–11 Champions League | Semifinals | (Germany) FCR Duisburg | 2–2 1–0 | Y. Nagasato 2, I. Kerschowski | |
| 2010–11 Champions League | Final | (France) Olympique Lyonnais | 0–2 | | |
| 2011–12 Champions League | Round of 32 | (Iceland) Þór-KA Akureyri | 6–0 8–2 | Y. Nagasato 3, I. Kerschowski 2, Mittag 2, Añonma, Göransson, Hanebeck, Peter, Zietz + 1 o.g. | |
| 2011–12 Champions League | Round of 16 | (Scotland) Glasgow City | 10–0 7–0 | Mittag 5, Añonma 2, De Ridder 3, Y. Nagasato 2, Demann, Draws, I. Kerschowski, Schmidt + 1 o.g. | |
| 2011–12 Champions League | Quarterfinals | (Russia) FC Rossiyanka | 2–0 3–0 | Y. Nagasato 2, Hanebeck, Peter + 1 o.g. | |
| 2011–12 Champions League | Semifinals | (France) Olympique Lyonnais | 1–5 0–0 | Schmidt | |
| 2012–13 Champions League | Round of 32 | (Belgium) Standard Liège | 3–1 5–0 | Andonova 4, Añonma, Y. Nagasato + 1 o.g. | |
| 2012–13 Champions League | Round of 16 | (England) Arsenal FC | 1–2 3–4 | Göransson 2, Y. Nagasato, Winters | |
| 2013–14 Champions League | Round of 32 | (Hungary) MTK Hungária | 5–0 6–0 | Andonova 3, Evans 2, Göransson 2, A. Nagasato 2, Draws, Mjelde | |
| 2013–14 Champions League | Round of 16 | (France) Olympique Lyonnais | 0–1 2–1 | Draws, Mjelde | |
| 2013–14 Champions League | Quarterfinals | (Italy) Torres | 8–0 4–1 | Simic 2, Wälti, Bremer, Añonma, Elsig, Evans, Nagasato, Wälti, Hegerberg + 1 o.g. | |
| 2013–14 Champions League | Semifinals | (Germany) Wolfsburg | 0–0 2–4 | Simic, Añonma | |

== 2004–05 UEFA Women's Cup ==
Turbine Potsdam were European champions in their international debut, overcoming the main group stage and defeating Energiya Voronezh, Trondheims-Ørn SK and Djurgården/Älvsjö with 8 wins and one draw. Conny Pohlers was the competition's top scorer with 14 goals.

=== Second stage ===
14 September 2004

| Turbine Potsdam (Germany) | 6 — 0 | (France) Montpellier HSC |
|---|---|---|
| Pohlers 6', 8' (pen.), 64'; Odebrecht 13'; Omilade 46'; Mittag 70' |

Karl-Liebknecht-Stadion, Potsdam
16 September 2004

| Turbine Potsdam (Germany) | 4 — 1 | (Poland) AZS Wroclaw |
|---|---|---|
| Odebrecht 27'; Pohlers 29', 90'; Zietz 54' | | Otrebska 90' |

Karl-Liebknecht-Stadion, Potsdam
18 September 2004

| Turbine Potsdam (Germany) | 7 — 5 | (Italy) Foroni Verona |
|---|---|---|
| Wimbersky 24', 88'; Omilade 26'; Hingst 37'; Pohlers 45', 45+1' (pen.), 67' | | Pedersen 8', 30'; Gazzoli 12'; Pintus 41'; Guarino 48' |

Karl-Liebknecht-Stadion, Potsdam

=== Quarter-finals ===
24 October 2004

| Energiya Voronezh (Russia) | 1 — 1 | (Germany) Turbine Potsdam |
|---|---|---|
| Rastetter 48' | | Becher 86' |

Central Stadium, Voronezh
Attendance: 2,000
Referee: (Finland) Anri Hänninen
31 October 2004

| Turbine Potsdam (Germany) | 4 — 1 | (Russia) Energiya Voronezh |
|---|---|---|
| Mittag 15'; Wimbersky 64', 73' (pen.); Odebrecht 82' | | Bosikova 52' |

Karl-Liebknecht-Stadion, Potsdam
Attendance: 2,868
Referee: (Hungary) Gyöngyi Gaál

=== Semifinals ===
9 April 2005

| Turbine Potsdam (Germany) | 4 — 0 | (Norway) Trondheims-Ørn SK |
|---|---|---|
| Pohlers 53', 56', 85'; Wimbersky 73' |

Karl-Liebknecht-Stadion, Potsdam
Attendance: 2,067
Referee: (France) Sarah Girard
16 April 2005

| Trondheims-Ørn SK (Norway) | 1 — 3 | (Germany) Turbine Potsdam |
|---|---|---|
| Pedersen 42' | | Hingst 54', 71'; Mittag 68' |

Lerkendal, Trondheim
Attendance: 650
Referee: (Bulgaria) Ilonka Milanova

=== Final ===
15 May 2005
13:00 (CET)

| Djurgården/Älvsjö (Sweden) | 0 — 2 | (Germany) Turbine Potsdam |
|---|---|---|
| | | Pohlers 34'; Mittag 53' |

Olympic Stadium, Stockholm
Attendance: 1,382
Referee: (Italy) Anna De Toni
21 May 2005
13:00 (CET)

| Turbine Potsdam (Germany) | 3 — 1 | (Sweden) Djurgården/Älvsjö |
|---|---|---|
| Wimbersky 2'; Pohlers 9', 16' | | Bengtsson 10' |

Karl-Liebknecht-Stadion, Potsdam
Attendance: 8,677
Referee: (Turkey) Lale Orta

== 2005–06 UEFA Women's Cup ==
Like the previous year, Turbine reached the final, notably overcoming a first-leg home defeat in the semifinals against Djurgården/Älvsjö, but lost it against 1. FFC Frankfurt. Conny Pohlers was again the competition's top scorer. The 12-1 victory over SV Neulengbach remains Turbine's largest win in UEFA competitions.

=== Second stage ===
13 September 2005

| Turbine Potsdam (Germany) | 12 — 1 | (Austria) SV Neulengbach |
|---|---|---|
| Wimbersky 8', 10', 51', 83'; Hingst 22'; Mittag 27', 45+1', 70'; Kerschowski 33'; Omilade 36'; Carlson 67' (pen.); Thomas 90+3' | | Graf 25' |

Montpellier
15 September 2005

| Turbine Potsdam (Germany) | 2 — 0 | (Netherlands) SV Saestum |
|---|---|---|
| Wimbersky 77'; Hingst 83' |

Montpellier
17 September 2005

| Montpellier HSC (France) | 0 — 0 | (Germany) Turbine Potsdam |

Montpellier

=== Quarter-finals ===
9 October 2005
15:00 (CET)

| Valur Reykjavík (Iceland) | 1 — 8 | (Germany) Turbine Potsdam |
|---|---|---|
| Odansdottir 36' | | Johannsdottir 16' (o.g.); Mittag 45', 59'; Cristiane 62', 84'; Pohlers 65'; Thomas 83'; Wimbersky 87' |

Laugardalsvöllur, Reykjavík
Referee: (Hungary) Gyöngyi Gaál
16 October 2005
15:00 (CET)

| Turbine Potsdam (Germany) | 11 — 1 | (Iceland) Valur Reykjavík |
|---|---|---|
| Pohlers 3', 21', 67'; Wimbersky 9', 57'; Omilade 23'; Mittag 36', 56'; Johannsdottir 46' (o.g.); Cristiane 49'; I. Kerschowski 66' | | Viðarsdóttir 14' |

Karl-Liebknecht-Stadion, Potsdam
Referee: (Romania) Floarea Ionescu

=== Semifinals ===
20 November 2005
15:00 (CET)

| Turbine Potsdam (Germany) | 2 — 3 | (Sweden) Djurgårdens/Älvsjö |
|---|---|---|
| Cristiane 11'; Pohlers 26' | | Fagerström 78'; Kalmari 86'; Svensson 90' |

Karl-Liebknecht-Stadion, Potsdam
Attendance: 1,616
Referee: (Belgium) Claudine Brohet
27 November 2005
12:00 (CET)

| Djurgården/Älvsjö (Sweden) | 2 — 5 | (Germany) Turbine Potsdam |
|---|---|---|
| Svensson 35'; Norlin 56' | | Podvorica 5'; Zietz 22'; Hingst 37'; Pohlers 56'; Mittag 87' |

Råsunda, Solna
Attendance: 250
Referee: (Italy) Anna De Toni

=== Final ===
20 May 2006
16:00 (CET)

| Turbine Potsdam (Germany) | 0 — 4 | (Germany) 1.FFC Frankfurt |
|---|---|---|
| | | Lingor 7', 84'; Albertz 64'; Garefrekes 77' |

Karl-Liebknecht-Stadion, Potsdam
Attendance: 4,431
Referee: (Sweden) Eva Oedlund
27 May 2006
14:15 (CET)

| Frankfurt (Germany) | 3 — 2 | (Germany) Turbine Potsdam |
|---|---|---|
| Jones 23'; Lingor 72' (pen.); Prinz 93' | | Pohlers 8', 35' |

Bornheimer Hang, Frankfurt
Attendance: 13,200
Referee: (Czech Republic) Dagmar Damkova

== 2006-07 UEFA Women's Cup ==
=== Second stage ===
12 September 2006

| Turbine Potsdam (Germany) | 1 — 0 | (Belgium) Rapide Wezemaal |
|---|---|---|
| Pohlers 79' |

Zeist
Attendance: 150
14 September 2006

| SV Saestum (Netherlands) | 2 — 2 | (Germany) Turbine Potsdam |
|---|---|---|
| Louwaars 21' van den Boogard 37' | | Pohlers 25', 44' |

Zeist
Attendance: 820
17 September 2006

| Turbine Potsdam (Germany) | 4 — 0 | (Czech Republic) Sparta Prague |
|---|---|---|
| I. Kerschowski 5'; Hingst 17'; Pohlers 33'; Kameraj 58' |

Zeist

=== Quarter-finals ===
11 October 2006
18:00 (CET)

| Brøndby IF (Denmark) | 3 — 0 | (Germany) Turbine Potsdam |
|---|---|---|
| Sorensen 7'; Kjar-Jensen 55'; Nielsen 85' |

Brøndby Stadium, Brøndby
Attendance: 697
Referee: (Slovakia) Alexandra Ihringova
18 October 2006
18:00 (CET)

| Turbine Potsdam (Germany) | 2 — 1 | (Denmark) Brøndby IF |
|---|---|---|
| Hingst 48'; Carlson 90' | | Falk 45' |

Karl-Liebknecht-Stadion, Potsdam
Attendance: 1,156
Referee: (Sweden) Eva Oedlund

== 2009-10 UEFA Women's Champions League ==
=== Round of 32 ===
30 September 2009
18:00 (CET)

| FC Honka (Finland) | 1 — 8 | (Germany) Turbine Potsdam |
|---|---|---|
| Hietanen 89' | | Mittag 8', 10', 60'; Zietz 14' (pen.); Helenius 16' (o.g.); Kessler 58'; Draws 71'; Tervo 90+3' (o.g.) |

Brøndby Stadium, Brøndby
Attendance: 702
Referee: (Italy) Silvia Spinelli
7 October 2009
19:00 (CET)

| Turbine Potsdam (Germany) | 8 — 0 | (Finland) FC Honka |
|---|---|---|
| Mittag 10', 79', 90+2'; Zietz 17'; Bagehorn 40'; Odebrecht 52'; Bajramaj 64', 71' |

Karl-Liebknecht-Stadion, Potsdam
Attendance: 1,383
Referee: (Sweden) Jenny Palmqvist

=== Round of 16 ===
4 November 2009
19:00 (CET)

| Turbine Potsdam (Germany) | 1 — 0 | (Denmark) Brøndby IF |
|---|---|---|
| Bajramaj 17' |

Attendance: 1,123
Referee: (Austria) Tanja Schett
11 November 2009
19:00 (CET)

| Brøndby IF (Denmark) | 0 — 4 | (Germany) Turbine Potsdam |
|---|---|---|
| | | Kessler 6', 88'; Wich 65'; Mittag 66' |

Attendance: 398
Referee: (Finland) Kirsi Heikkinen

=== Quarter-finals ===
10 March 2010
19:00 (CET)

| Turbine Potsdam (Germany) | 5 — 0 | (Norway) Røa IL |
|---|---|---|
| Kessler 20' 69'; Odebrecht 43'; Peter 49'; Nagasato 80' |

Karl-Liebknecht-Stadion, Potsdam
Attendance: 1,496
Referee: (Ukraine) Kateryna Monzul
17 March 2010
15:30 (CET)

| Røa IL (Norway) | 0 — 5 | (Germany) Turbine Potsdam |
|---|---|---|
| | | Mittag 30' 63'; Bajramaj 56'; Nagasato 73'; Wich 82' |

Roa Stadium, Oslo
Attendance: 285
Referee: (England) Alexandra Ihringova

=== Semifinals ===
11 April 2010
14:00 (CEST)

| FCR Duisburg (Germany) | 1 — 0 | (Germany) Turbine Potsdam |
|---|---|---|
| Maes 28' |

PCC-Stadion, Duisburg
Attendance: 2,150
Referee: (Czech Republic) Dagmar Damková
18 April 2010
14:00 (CEST)

| Turbine Potsdam (Germany) | 1 — 0 | (Germany) FCR Duisburg |
|---|---|---|
| Kemme 62' |
Penalties
| Zietz (penalty scored); Mittag (penalty scored); Peter (penalty scored); Bajramaj (penalty missed) | 3 — 1 | (penalty missed) Grings; (penalty missed) Bresonik; (penalty scored) Wermelt; (penalty missed) Ioannidou |

Karl-Liebknecht-Stadion, Potsdam
Attendance: 4,522
Referee: (Hungary) Gyöngyi Gaál

=== Final ===
20 May 2010
20:30 (CEST)

| Turbine Potsdam (Germany) | 0 – 0 | (France) Olympique Lyonnais |
Penalties
| Zietz (penalty missed); Peter (penalty scored); Odebrecht (penalty scored); Mittag (penalty missed); Kerschowski (penalty scored); Nagasato (penalty scored); Bajramaj (penalty scored); Sarholz (penalty scored); Schmidt (penalty scored) | 7 — 6 | (penalty scored) Franco; (penalty scored) Dickenmann; (penalty scored) Kaci; (penalty missed) Henry; (penalty missed) Herlovsen; (penalty scored) Renard; (penalty scored) Simone; (penalty scored) Bouhaddi; (penalty missed) Thomis |

Coliseum Alfonso Pérez, Getafe
Attendance: 10,372
Referee: (Finland) Kirsi Heikkinen

== 2010-11 UEFA Women's Champions League ==
=== Round of 32 ===
22 September 2010
18:00 (CET)

| Åland United (Finland) | 0 — 9 | (Germany) Turbine Potsdam |
|---|---|---|
| | | Bajramaj 5'; Mittag 17', 72', 90+3'; Schmidt 34'; Nagasato 35'; Kemme 58'; Peter 58'; Demann 79' |

Wiklöf Holding Arena, Mariehamn
Attendance: 1,553
Referee: (Romania) Cristina Dorcioman
13 October 2010
16:00 (CET)

| Turbine Potsdam (Germany) | 6 — 0 | (Finland) Åland United |
|---|---|---|
| Bajramaj 1'; Wesely 4'; Kessler 30'; Mittag 40'; Schmidt 59'; Peter 68' |

Karl-Liebknecht-Stadion, Potsdam
Attendance: 1,450
Referee: (Greece) Efthalia Mitsi

=== Round of 16 ===
3 November 2010
14:00 (CET)

| Turbine Potsdam (Germany) | 7 — 0 | (Austria) SV Neulengbach |
|---|---|---|
| Kessler 7'; Mittag 28', 77'; Zietz 58', 90'; Odebrecht 53' |

Karl-Liebknecht-Stadion, Potsdam
Attendance: 1,200
Referee: (Belgium) Claudine Brohet
10 November 2010
19:00 (CET)

| SV Neulengbach (Austria) | 0 — 9 | (Germany) Turbine Potsdam |
|---|---|---|
| | | Wesely 13'; Bajramaj 22', 25'; Zietz 45' (pen.); Yuki Nagasato 53', 71', 82' |

Wienerwaldstadion, Neulengbach
Attendance: 1,100
Referee: (Switzerland) Esther Staubli

=== Quarter-finals ===
16 March 2011
19:00 (CET)

| FCF Juvisy (France) | 0 — 3 | (Germany) Turbine Potsdam |
|---|---|---|
| | | Schmidt 8'; Bajramaj 28'; Soubeyrand 65' (o.g.) |

Robert Bobin, Evry
Attendance: 2,487
Referee: (Ukraine) Kateryna Monzul
23 March 2011
19:00 (CET)

| Turbine Potsdam (Germany) | 6 — 2 | (France) FCF Juvisy |
|---|---|---|
| Kerschowski 18', 75'; Nagasato 31', 33'; Schmidt 45+1'; Mittag 62' | | Tonazzi 37'; Thiney 52' |

Karl-Liebknecht-Stadion, Potsdam
Attendance: 2,350
Referee: (England) Alexandra Ihringova

=== Semifinals ===
9 April 2011
15:25 (CET)

| FCR Duisburg (Germany) | 2 — 2 | (Germany) Turbine Potsdam |
|---|---|---|
| Grings 32'; Oster 42' | | I. Kerschowski 16'; Nagasato 35' |

PCC-Stadion, Duisburg
Attendance: 3,260
Referee: (Romania) Cristina Dorcioman
17 April 2011
14:15 (CET)

| Turbine Potsdam (Germany) | 1 — 0 | (Germany) FCR Duisburg |
|---|---|---|
| Nagasato 40' |

Karl-Liebknecht-Stadion, Potsdam
Attendance: 4,600
Referee: (Finland) Kirsi Heikkinen

=== Final ===
26 May 2011
21:00 CEST

| Turbine Potsdam (Germany) | 0 — 2 | (France) Olympique Lyonnais |
|---|---|---|
| | Report | Renard 27'; Dickenmann 85' |

Craven Cottage, London
Attendance: 14,303
Referee: (Czech Republic) Dagmar Damková

== 2011-12 UEFA Women's Champions League ==
=== Round of 32 ===
28 September 2011
18:15

| Þór/KA Akureyri (Iceland) | 0 — 6 | (Germany) Turbine Potsdam |
|---|---|---|
| | | Ásgrímsdóttir 11' (o.g.); Nagasato 13', 50', 57'; Peter 74'; Añonma 76' |

Þórsvöllur, Akureyri
Attendance: 530
Referee: (Hungary) Katalin Kulcsár
5 October 2011
19:00

| Turbine Potsdam (Germany) | 8 — 2 | (Iceland) Þór/KA |
|---|---|---|
| I. Kerschowski 2', 90+1'; Mittag 8', 20'; Hanebeck 18'; Zietz 55'; Göransson 56'; Hardardóttir 78' (o.g.) | | Ásgrímsdóttir 34'; Caldwell 75' |

Karl-Liebknecht-Stadion, Potsdam
Attendance: 1,530
Referee: (Greece) Efthalia Mitsi

=== Round of 16 ===
2 November 2011
17:00

| Turbine Potsdam (Germany) | 10 — 0 | (Scotland) Glasgow City |
|---|---|---|
| Añonma 2', 47'; Schmidt 15'; Mittag 25', 72', 75'; Nagasato 51', 55' de Ridder 78'; Mcdonald 81' (o.g.) |

Karl-Liebknecht-Stadion, Potsdam
Attendance: 1,750
Referee: (Switzerland) Esther Staubli
10 November 2011
19:05

| Glasgow City (Scotland) | 0 — 7 | (Germany) Turbine Potsdam |
|---|---|---|
| | Report | de Ridder 5', 41'; Mittag 10', 62'; Demann 20'; Draws 74'; Kerschowski 89' |

Petershill Park, Glasgow
Attendance: 557
Referee: (Romania) Cristina Dorcioman

=== Quarter-finals ===
14 March 2012
18:00

| Turbine Potsdam (Germany) | 2 — 0 | (Russia) FK Rossiyanka |
|---|---|---|
| Hanebeck 24'; Peter 44' |

Karl-Liebknecht-Stadion, Potsdam
Attendance: 2,120
Referee: (Italy) Silvia Spinelli
22 March 2012
12:00

| FK Rossiyanka (Russia) | 0 — 3 | (Germany) Turbine Potsdam |
|---|---|---|
| | | Chorna 40' (o.g.); Nagasato 45+1', 77' |

Trud Stadium, Podolsk
Attendance: 5,350
Referee: (Sweden) Jenny Palmqvist

=== Semifinals ===
15 April 2012
18:00

| Olympique Lyonnais (France) | 5 — 1 | (Germany) Turbine Potsdam |
|---|---|---|
| Henry 6'; Abily 20', 61'; Schelin 21'; Dickenmann 55' | | Schmidt 89' |

Stade de Gerland, Lyon
Attendance: 12,800
Referee: (Romania) Teodora Albon
22 April 2012
14:00

| Turbine Potsdam (Germany) | 0 — 0 | (France) Olympique Lyonnais |

Karl-Liebknecht-Stadion, Potsdam
Attendance: 3,870
Referee: (Norway) Christina W. Pedersen

== 2012-13 UEFA Women's Champions League ==
=== Round of 32 ===
26 September 2012
19:00

| Standard Liège (Belgium) | 1 — 3 | (Germany) Turbine Potsdam |
|---|---|---|
| Coutereels 6' | | Andonova 15', 35'; Courtois 38' (o.g.) |

Stade Maurice Dufrasne, Liège
Attendance: 3,905
Referee: (Russia) Anastasia Pustovoitova
3 October 2012
14:00

| Turbine Potsdam (Germany) | 5 — 0 | (Belgium) Standard Liège |
|---|---|---|
| Andonova 18', 47', 90+3'; Ōgimi 45+3'; Añonma 87' |

Karl-Liebknecht-Stadion, Potsdam
Attendance: 2,460
Referee: (Finland) Lina Lehtovaara

=== Round of 16 ===
1 November 2012
15:00

| Arsenal FC (England) | 2 — 1 | (Germany) Turbine Potsdam |
|---|---|---|
| Chapman 70'; White 82' | | Ōgimi 90' |

Meadow Park, Borehamwood
Attendance: 832
Referee: (Malta) Esther Azzopardi
7 November 2012
18:00

| Turbine Potsdam (Germany) | 3 — 4 | (England) Arsenal FC |
|---|---|---|
| Göransson 48', 59'; Winters 55' | | Smith 27', 34', 57'; White 81' |

Karl-Liebknecht-Stadion, Potsdam
Attendance: 3,260
Referee: (Italy) Carina Vitulano

== 2013-14 UEFA Women's Champions League ==
=== Round of 32 ===
10 October 2013
15:00

| MTK Hungária (Hungary) | 0 — 5 | (Germany) Turbine Potsdam |
|---|---|---|
| | | Mjelde 11'; Andonova 30'; Draws 32'; Evans 34', 76' |

Hidegkuti Nándor Stadium, Budapest
Attendance: 851
Referee: (Armenia) Knarik Grigoryan
16 October 2013
19:00

| Turbine Potsdam (Germany) | 6 — 0 | (Hungary) MTK Hungária |
|---|---|---|
| Nagasato 62', 90+2'; Andonova 63', 88'; Göransson 65', 84' |

Karl-Liebknecht-Stadion, Potsdam
Attendance: 1,480
Referee: (Greece) Eleni Lampadariou

=== Round of 16 ===
10 November 2013
16:00

| Turbine Potsdam (Germany) | 0 — 1 | (France) Olympique Lyonnais |
|---|---|---|
| | | Nécib 83' |

Karl-Liebknecht-Stadion, Potsdam
Attendance: 4,180
Referee: (Czech Republic) Jana Adámková
14 November 2013
20:00

| Olympique Lyonnais (France) | 1 — 2 | (Germany) Turbine Potsdam |
|---|---|---|
| Abily 12' | | Draws 33'; Mjelde 73' (pen.) |

Stade de Gerland, Lyon
Attendance: 9,949
Referee: (Ukraine) Kateryna Monzul

=== Quarter-finals ===
23 March 2014
15:00

| ASD Torres (Italy) | 0 — 8 | (Germany) Turbine Potsdam |
|---|---|---|
| | | Tucceri Cimini 2' (o.g.); Wälti 27'; Bremer 28'; Simic 44', 53'; Añonma 55'; Elsig 78'; Evans 79' |

Stadio Vanni Sanna, Sassari
Attendance: 562
Referee: (Romania) Cristina Dorcioman
30 March 2014
13:00

| Turbine Potsdam (Germany) | 4 — 1 | (Italy) ASD Torres |
|---|---|---|
| Nagasato 38'; Wälti 43'; Hegerberg 54', 85' | | Domenichetti 49' |

Karl-Liebknecht-Stadion, Potsdam
Attendance: 2,830
Referee: (Hungary) Gyöngyi Gaál

=== Semifinals ===
19 April 2014
14:00

| Turbine Potsdam (Germany) | 0 — 0 | (Germany) VfL Wolfsburg |

Karl-Liebknecht-Stadion, Potsdam
Attendance: 5,110
Referee: (Greece) Efthalia Mitsi
27 April 2014
17:15

| VfL Wolfsburg (Germany) | 4 — 2 | (Germany) Turbine Potsdam |
|---|---|---|
| Kessler 17'; Popp 41', 46'; Müller 80' | | Simic 7'; Añonma 35' |

Volkswagen Arena, Wolfsburg
Attendance: 10,791
Referee: (Switzerland) Esther Staubli
