= 2010 UEFA Women's Champions League final =

2010 UEFA Women's Champions League
- Event: 2009–10 UEFA Women's Champions League
Turbine Potsdam	Lyon
(Germany)	(France)
0	0
- Turbine Potsdam won 7–6 on penalties
- Date: 20 May 2010
- Venue: Coliseum Alfonso Pérez, Getafe
- Referee: Kirsi Heikkinen (Finland)
- Attendance: 10,372

The 2010 UEFA Women's Champions League Final was held at Coliseum Alfonso Pérez in Getafe, Spain, on 20 May 2010. It was the first final of the competition after the rebranding from Women's Cup to the Champions League. The final saw Turbine Potsdam beat Lyon 7–6 on penalties after a 0-0 draw after extra time.

== Route to the final ==
Lyon's path	Result	Round	Potsdam's path	Result
(Serbia) Mašinac Niš	1–0, 5–0	Round of 32	(Finland) Honka	8–1, 8–0
(Denmark) Fortuna Hjørring	1–0, 5–0	Round of 16	(Denmark) Brøndby	1–0, 4–0
(Italy) Torres	3–0, 0–1	Quarter-final	(Norway) Røa	5–0, 5–0
(Sweden) Umeå	3–2, 0–0	Semi-final	(Germany) Duisburg	0–1, 1–0 a.e.t. (3–1 pen)

== Final ==
20 May 2010
20:30 (CEST)

Lyon (France)	0–0 (a.e.t.)	(Germany) Turbine Potsdam
	Report
Penalties
Franco (penalty scored); Dickenmann (penalty scored); Kaci (penalty scored); Henry (penalty missed); Herlovsen (penalty missed); Renard (penalty scored); Simone (penalty scored); Bouhaddi (penalty scored); Thomis (penalty missed)	6–7	(penalty missed) Zietz; (penalty scored) Peter; (penalty scored) Odebrecht; (penalty missed) Mittag; (penalty scored) Kerschowski; (penalty scored) Nagasato; (penalty scored) Bajramaj; (penalty scored) Sarholz; (penalty scored) Schmidt

Coliseum Alfonso Pérez, Getafe, Spain
Attendance: 10,372
Referee: Kirsi Heikkinen (Finland)

GK	26	(France) Sarah Bouhaddi
DF	17	(France) Corine Franco
DF	5	(France) Laura Georges (c)	(yellow card) 68'
DF	3	(France) Wendie Renard	(yellow card) 8'
DF	27	(Sweden) Amelie Rybäck
MF	11	(Costa Rica) Shirley Cruz Traña	(yellow card) 89'	(substituted off) 105'
MF	4	(Norway) Ingvild Stensland		(substituted off) 70'
MF	22	(France) Amandine Henry
MF	10	(France) Louisa Necib		(substituted off) 90'
MF	21	(Switzerland) Lara Dickenmann
FW	12	(France) Élodie Thomis
Substitutes:
GK	25	(Norway) Christine Nilsen
DF	2	(France) Sandrine Dusang
MF	15	(France) Aurélie Kaci		(substituted on) 70'
MF	6	(Brazil) Simone		(substituted on) 105'
FW	7	(France) Sandrine Brétigny
FW	9	(Brazil) Kátia
FW	24	(Norway) Isabell Herlovsen		(substituted on) 90'
Manager:
(France) Farid Benstiti

GK	24	(Germany) Anna Felicitas Sarholz
DF	20	(Germany) Bianca Schmidt
DF	4	(Germany) Babett Peter
DF	5	(Germany) Josephine Henning
MF	14	(Germany) Jennifer Zietz (c)
MF	16	(Germany) Viola Odebrecht
MF	21	(Germany) Tabea Kemme	(yellow card) 15'	(substituted off) 106'
MF	23	(Germany) Nadine Keßler		(substituted off) 66'
FW	10	(Germany) Fatmire Bajramaj
FW	31	(Germany) Anja Mittag	(yellow card) 97'
FW	9	(Germany) Jessica Wich		(substituted off) 66'
Substitutes:
GK	1	(Germany) Desirée Schumann
DF	19	(Germany) Corina Schröder		(substituted on) 106'
DF	22	(Germany) Stefanie Draws
MF	6	(Germany) Marie-Louise Bagehorn
MF	7	(Germany) Isabel Kerschowski		(substituted on) 66'
MF	33	(Germany) Carolin Schiewe
FW	17	(Japan) Yuki Nagasato		(substituted on) 66'
Manager:
(Germany) Bernd Schröder

MATCH OFFICIALS

- Assistant referees:
  - Tonja Paavola
  - Anu Jokela
- Fourth official: Lina Lehtovaara

MATCH RULES

- 90 minutes.
- 30 minutes of extra-time if necessary.
- Penalty shoot-out if scores still level.
- Seven named substitutes.
- Maximum of three substitutions.

== See also ==
- Played between same clubs:
- 2011 UEFA Women's Champions League final
