= 2011 UEFA Women's Champions League final =

2011 UEFA Champions League
- Event: 2010–11 UEFA Women's Champions League
Lyon	Turbine Potsdam
(France)	(Germany)
2	0
- Date: 26 May 2011
- Venue: Craven Cottage, London
- Player of the Match: Camille Abily (Lyon)
- Referee: Dagmar Damková (Czech Republic)
- Attendance: 14,303

The 2011 UEFA Women's Champions League Final was the final of the second season of the UEFA Women's Champions League and was held at Fulham's Craven Cottage in London, England, on 26 May 2011.

For the second year in a row, Lyon met Turbine Potsdam in the final. Unlike last year, Lyon came up with the victory as they defeated Potsdam 2–0 after goals from Wendie Renard and Lara Dickenmann. This was Lyon's first Champions League title. Television audience: 1,8 Million viewers on Direct 8, French Channel.

== Route to the final ==
Lyon		Round	Potsdam
Opponent	Result	2010–11 UEFA Women's Champions League	Opponent	Result
(Netherlands) AZ	2–1, 8–0	Round of 32	(Finland) Åland United	9–0, 6–0
(Russia) WFC Rossiyanka	6–1, 5–0	Round of 16	(Austria) SV Neulengbach	7–0, 9–0
(Russia) Zvezda 2005 Perm	0–0, 1–0	Quarter-finals	(France) FCF Juvisy	3–0, 6–2
(England) Arsenal	2–0, 3–2	Semi-finals	(Germany) FCR Duisburg	2–2, 1–0

== Match ==
=== Details ===
26 May 2011
20:00 BST

Lyon (France)	2–0	(Germany) Turbine Potsdam
Renard 27'; Dickenmann 85'	Report

Craven Cottage, London
Attendance: 14,303
Referee: Dagmar Damková (Czech Republic)

Lyon	Turbine Potsdam

GK	26	(France) Sarah Bouhaddi
DF	3	(France) Wendie Renard
DF	5	(France) Laura Georges
DF	20	(France) Sabrina Viguier
MF	6	(France) Amandine Henry
MF	10	(France) Louisa Necib		(substituted off) 55'
MF	11	(Costa Rica) Shirley Cruz Traña
MF	18	(France) Sonia Bompastor (c)
MF	23	(France) Camille Abily	(yellow card) 60'
FW	8	(Sweden) Lotta Schelin
FW	12	(France) Élodie Thomis		(substituted off) 73'
Substitutions:
GK	1	(France) Véronique Pons
MF	4	(Norway) Ingvild Stensland
FW	7	(France) Sandrine Brétigny
FW	9	(France) Eugénie Le Sommer		(substituted on) 73'
MF	15	(France) Aurélie Kaci
MF	21	(Switzerland) Lara Dickenmann		(substituted on) 55'
MF	25	(France) Amel Majri
Manager:
(France) Patrice Lair

GK	24	(Germany) Anna Felicitas Sarholz
DF	4	(Germany) Babett Peter
DF	5	(Germany) Josephine Henning
DF	15	(Germany) Inka Wesely
DF	20	(Germany) Bianca Schmidt
MF	7	(Germany) Isabel Kerschowski
MF	10	(Germany) Fatmire Bajramaj
MF	14	(Germany) Jennifer Zietz (c)
MF	16	(Germany) Viola Odebrecht
FW	21	(Germany) Tabea Kemme
FW	31	(Germany) Anja Mittag
Substitutions:
GK	1	(Germany) Desirée Schumann
DF	2	(Germany) Kristin Demann
DF	3	(Germany) Daniela Löwenberg
MF	6	(Germany) Marie-Louise Bagehorn
FW	9	(Germany) Jessica Wich
MF	11	(Germany) Jennifer Cramer
DF	19	(Germany) Corina Schröder
Manager:
(Germany) Bernd Schröder

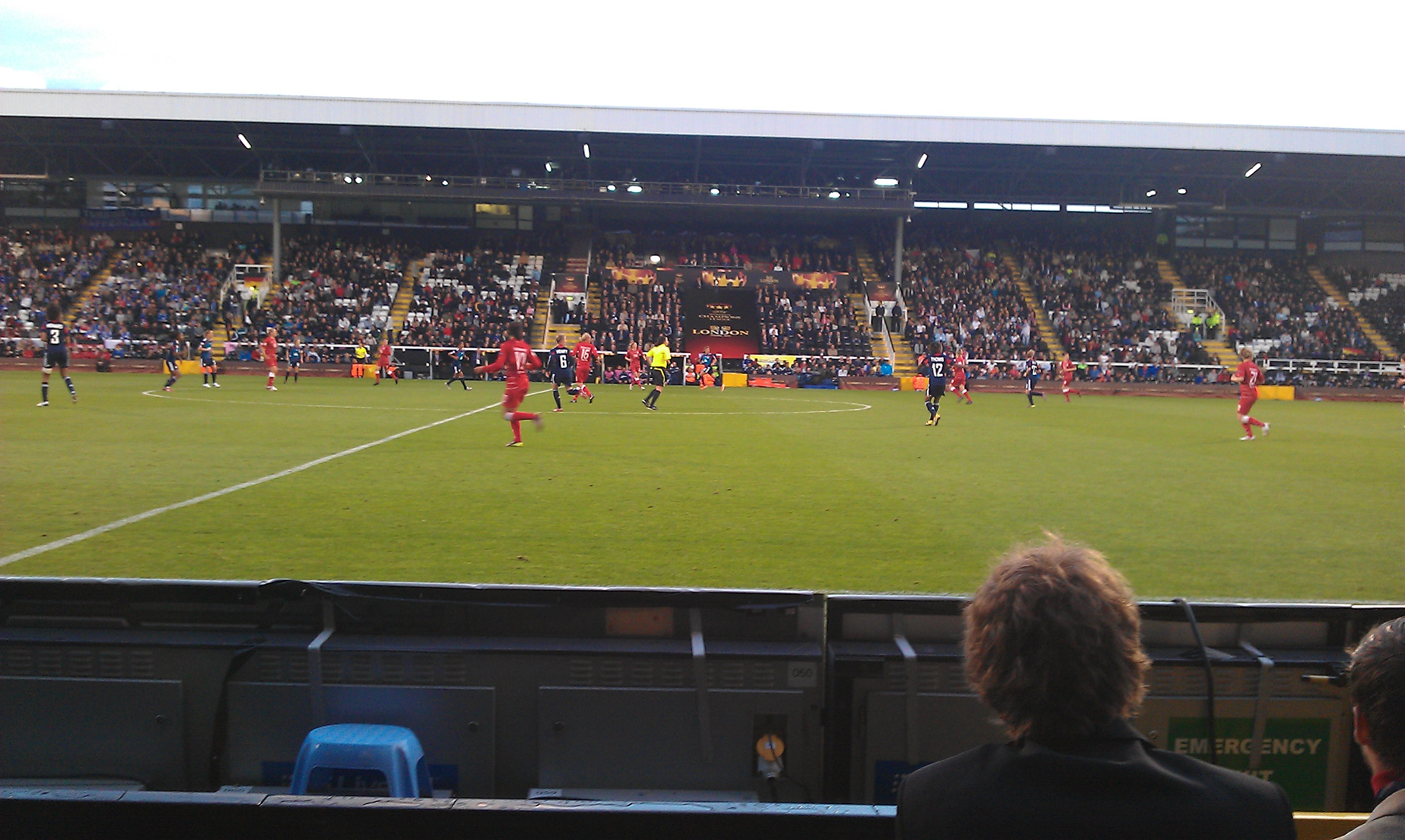
Photo from the final at Craven Cottage

Player of the Match:
(France) Camille Abily (Lyon)

Assistant referees:
Adriana Šecová (Czech Republic)
Lucie Ratajová (Czech Republic)
Fourth official:
Jana Adámková (Czech Republic)

== See also ==
- Played between same clubs:
- 2010 UEFA Women's Champions League final
