= 2010–11 DFB-Pokal Frauen =

Tournament details
- Country: Germany
- Teams: 57

Final positions
- Champions: 1. FFC Frankfurt
- Runners-up: 1. FFC Turbine Potsdam

Tournament statistics
- Matches played: 57

The DFB-Pokal 2010–11 was the 31st season of the cup competition, Germany's second-most important title in women's football. 1. FFC Frankfurt defeated 1. FFC Turbine Potsdam 2–1 in the final in Cologne on 26 March 2011.

== Participating clubs ==
The following teams were qualified for the DFB-Pokal:

BUNDESLIGA all clubs of 2009–10	2. BUNDESLIGA; 19 of 24 clubs of 2009–10 (Note: Being second teams FCR 2001 Duisburg II, FFC Frankfurt II, Hamburg II, Bayern Munich II, and Turbine Potsdam II may not compete in the cup.)	REGIONALLIGA clubs promoted in 2009–10	REGIONAL CUPS; Winners of 2009–10
SC 07 Bad Neuenahr Tennis Borussia Berlin FCR 2001 Duisburg Essen-Schönebeck FFC Frankfurt SC Freiburg Hamburg FF USV Jena Bayern Munich Turbine Potsdam FC Saarbrücken VfL Wolfsburg	Werder Bremen TSV Crailsheim HSV Borussia Friedenstal SV Victoria Gersten FSV Gütersloh 2009 ASV Hagsfeld Blau-Weiß Hohen Neuendorf Holstein Kiel FC Köln Bayer Leverkusen Lokomotive Leipzig FV Löchgau Magdeburger FFC Wacker München FFC Oldesloe 2000 TuS Wörrstadt SC Sand VfL Sindelfingen VfL Bochum (Note: The women's section of Wattenscheid 09 joined VfL Bochum.)	BV Cloppenburg 1899 Hoffenheim Leipziger FC 07: 1. FFC 08 Niederkirchen; 1. FFC Recklinghausen 2003	Schleswig-Holstein: TuRa Meldorf (Note: Oldesloe II won the cup, but second teams are not eligible to play in the cup.); Hamburg: SV Wilhelmsburg; Bremen: Bremer TS Neustadt (Note: Werder Bremen II won the cup, but second teams are not eligible to play in the DFB-Pokal.); Lower Saxony: ATSV Scharmbeckstotel (Note: BV Cloppenburg won the cup, but is qualified as a team that achieved promotion to the 2. Bundesliga.); Mecklenburg-Vorpommern: SV Hafen Rostock 61; Brandenburg: Blau-Weiß Beelitz; Berlin: Lichterfelder FC; Saxony-Anhalt: Hallescher FC; Saxony: Leipziger FC 07; Thuringia: 1. FFV Erfurt; Middle Rhine: Alemannia Aachen; Lower Rhine: Borussia Mönchengladbach; Westphalia: Arminia Bielefeld (Note: Recklinghausen won the cup, but is qualified as a team that achieved promotion to the 2. Bundesliga.); Rhineland: FC Bitburg; South West: SpVgg Rehweiler-Matzenbach (Note: Niederkirchen won the cup, but is qualified as a team that achieved promotion to the 2. Bundesliga.); Saarland: SV Dirmingen; Hesse: TSV Jahn Calden; Württemberg: TB Neckarhausen (Note: Sindelfingen II won the cup, but second teams are not eligible to play in the DFB-Pokal.); North Baden: SC Klinge Seckach (Note: Hoffenheim won the cup, but is qualified as a team that achieved promotion to the 2. Bundesliga.); South Baden: Hegauer FV; Bavaria: ETSV Würzburg

== 1st round ==
The drawing for the first round was on 2 July 2010. The seven best clubs of the previous Bundesliga season, Turbine Potsdam, FCR Duisburg, FFC Frankfurt, Bayern Munich, VfL Wolfsburg, Bad Neuenahr, and Hamburger SV, were awarded byes for the first round.

7 August 2010
VfL Bochum	0 – 3	1. FC Lokomotive Leipzig
ETSV Würzburg	2 – 4	1. FC Köln
ASV Hagsfeld	3 – 4	TB Neckarhausen
8 August 2010
Hallescher FC	0 – 7	FSV Gütersloh 2009
Lichterfelder FC	2 – 1	1. FFC Recklinghausen
SV Wilhelmsburg	0 – 10	FFC Oldesloe 2000
ATSV Schermbeckstotel	1 – 3	BV Cloppenburg
Leipziger FC 07	0 – 16	SG Essen-Schönebeck
Bremer TS Neustadt	0 – 11	Tennis Borussia Berlin
Blau-Weiß Hohen Neuendorf	0 – 4	Herforder SV
SV Hafen Rostock 61	1 – 9	Magdeburger FFC
Arminia Bielefeld	1 – 10	SV Victoria Gersten
TSV Jahn Calden	3 – 1	Holstein Kiel
TuRa Meldorf	0 – 2	Werder Bremen
Blau-Weiß Beelitz	0 – 6	1. FC Lübars
Alemannia Aachen	0 – 7	TSG 1899 Hoffenheim
SC Klinge Seckach	0 – 18	FF USV Jena
SpVgg Rehweiler-Matzenbach	0 – 3	VfL Sindelfingen
1. FFV Erfurt	0 – 11	Bayer 04 Leverkusen
FFC Wacker München	0 – 5	1. FC Saarbrücken
SV Dirmingen	0 – 4	TSV Crailsheim
Hegauer FV	0 – 7	SC Freiburg
FC Bitburg	0 – 3	FV Löchgau
TuS Wörrstadt	3 – 9	1. FFC 08 Niederkirchen
Borussia Mönchengladbach	2 – 1 (a.e.t.)	SC Sand

== 2nd round ==
The draw for the second round was held on 16 August 2010. The matches were played on 1 September 2010.

1 September 2010
SG Essen-Schönebeck	7–0	Magdeburger FFC
TB Neckarhausen	0–5	1. FC Köln
FF USV Jena	4–2 (a.e.t.)	SC Freiburg
FC Löchgau	1–0 (a.e.t.)	1. FC Lok Leipzig
VfL Sindelfingen	1–2	1899 Hoffenheim
1. FC Saarbrücken	3–1	TSV Crailsheim
TSV Jahn Calden	1–4	Hamburger SV
Herforder SV	0–6	FCR 2001 Duisburg
1. FFC 08 Niederkirchen	0–4	FC Bayern München
Lichterfelder FC	0–8	1. FFC Turbine Potsdam
VfL Wolfsburg	5–0	1. FC Lübars
Tennis Borussia Berlin	0–3	FFC Oldesloe
SV Werder Bremen	2–3	FSV Gütersloh 2009
Bayer 04 Leverkusen	0–6	1. FFC Frankfurt
Borussia Mönchengladbach	0–1	SC 07 Bad Neuenahr
8 September 2010
BV Cloppenburg	2–4	SV Victoria Gersten

== Round of 16 ==
The draw for the round of 16 was held on 11 September 2010. The matches were played on 23 and 24 October 2010.

23 October 2010
Hamburger SV	1–0	TSG 1899 Hoffenheim
FFC Oldesloe	1–1 (a.e.t.) (1 – 3 pen)	FSV Gütersloh 2009
24 October 2010
1. FFC Frankfurt	11–0	FV Löchgau
FC Bayern München	8–0	SV Victoria Gersten
SG Essen-Schönebeck	2–1	1. FC Köln
SC 07 Bad Neuenahr	7–0	1. FC Saarbrücken
FF USV Jena	0–8	1. FFC Turbine Potsdam
VfL Wolfsburg	1–5	FCR 2001 Duisburg

== Quarter-finals ==
The draw was held on 28 October 2010. The matches were planned to be played on 12 December 2010, but have been postponed several times due to bad weather.

30 January 2011

1.FFC Turbine Potsdam	1 – 0	SG Essen-Schönebeck
Schmidt 59'

30 January 2011

SC 07 Bad Neuenahr	3 – 1	Hamburger SV
Okoyino da Mbabi 56'; Maier 80'; Ni. Rolser 88'		Kameraj 88'

9 February 2011

Bayern Munich	3 – 0	FCR Duisburg
Lotzen 68'; S. Banecki 72'; Simic 77'

9 February 2011

FSV Gütersloh	0 – 4	1.FFC Frankfurt
		Huth 31', 34'; Marozsán 64'; Pohlers 76'

== Semi-finals ==
The draw for the semi-finals was held on 3 February 2011. The matches were played on 27 February 2011.

1. FFC Frankfurt	3 – 1	SC 07 Bad Neuenahr
Pohlers 7'; Smisek 14'; Garefrekes 68'		Goeßling 63'

FC Bayern Munich	2 – 4	1.FFC Turbine Potsdam
Wenninger 36'; Wimbersky 39'		Odebrecht 13'; Nagasato 15'; Mittag 20'; Andonova 74'

== Final ==
26 March 2011
16:15 (CET)

1. FFC Frankfurt	2 – 1	1. FFC Turbine Potsdam
Huth 15'; Garefrekes 48'	Report	Nagasato 43'

RheinEnergieStadion (Cologne)
Attendance: 20,312
Referee: Christina Jaworek

1. FFC FRANKFURT:
GK	1	(Germany) Nadine Angerer
DF	18	(Germany) Kerstin Garefrekes
DF	17	(Germany) Ariane Hingst
DF	2	(United States) Gina Lewandowski
DF	12	(Germany) Meike Weber	(yellow card) 76'	(substituted off) 90+2'
MF	7	(Germany) Melanie Behringer		(substituted off) 81'
MF	10	(Germany) Dzsenifer Marozsán
MF	28	(Germany) Sandra Smisek
MF	14	(United States) Alexandra Krieger
FW	9	(Germany) Birgit Prinz
FW	15	(Germany) Svenja Huth		(substituted off) 61'
Substitutes:
FW	6	(Germany) Conny Pohlers		(substituted on) 61'
FW	11	(Sweden) Jessica Landström		(substituted on) 81'
DF	5	(Sweden) Sara Thunebro		(substituted on) 90+2'
Manager:
(Germany) Sven Kahlert

1. FFC TURBINE POTSDAM:
GK	24	(Germany) Anna Felicitas Sarholz
DF	15	(Germany) Inka Wesely		(substituted off) 62'
DF	4	(Germany) Babett Peter
DF	8	(Germany) Josephine Henning
MF	20	(Germany) Bianca Schmidt
MF	16	(Germany) Viola Odebrecht
MF	10	(Germany) Fatmire Bajramaj
MF	14	(Germany) Jennifer Zietz
MF	21	(Germany) Tabea Kemme		(substituted off) 46'
FW	17	(Japan) Yūki Nagasato		(substituted off) 82'
FW	31	(Germany) Anja Mittag	(yellow card) 82'
Substitutes:
MF	7	(Germany) Isabel Kerschowski		(substituted on) 46'
MF	3	(Germany) Monique Kerschowski		(substituted on) 62'
FW	25	(North Macedonia) Nataša Andonova		(substituted on) 82'
Manager:
(Germany) Bernd Schröder

MATCH RULES

- 90 minutes.
- 30 minutes of extra-time if necessary, except in the final.
- Penalty shootout if scores still level.
- Seven named substitutes
- Maximum of 3 substitutions.
