= 2004–05 DFB-Pokal Frauen =

Tournament details
- Country: Germany
- Teams: 32

Final positions
- Champions: Turbine Potsdam
- Runners-up: FFC Frankfurt

Tournament statistics
- Matches played: 31

The Frauen DFB-Pokal 2004–05 was the 25th season of the cup competition, Germany's second-most important title in women's football. It was the last time the cup was held over five rounds and also the last time, that clubs were allowed to have more than one side in the tournament. The first round of the competition was held on 28–29 August 2004. In the final which was held in Berlin on 29 April 2006 Turbine Potsdam faced FFC Frankfurt as in the previous year and again Turbine won 3–0, thus claiming their second title.

== First round ==
28 August 2004
Tennis Borussia Berlin	2 – 4	VfL Wolfsburg
29 August 2004
FFV Neubrandenburg	0 – 6	Heike Rheine
Magdeburger FFC	0 – 9	Essen-Schönebeck
Erzgebirge Aue	0 – 4	FSV Frankfurt
Bad Neuenahr II	0 – 9	FFC Frankfurt
FF USV Jena	1 – 2	FSV Jägersburg
FFC Oldesloe	2 – 4	TuS Köln rrh.	(aet)
Brauweiler Pulheim	3 – 2	FCR 2001 Duisburg	(aet)
Turbine Potsdam II	6 – 5	Hamburg	(pso)
Gütersloh 2000	11 – 3	Hamburg II
Klinge Sekach	1 – 6	SC Freiburg
FC Memmingen	1 – 6	Bayern Munich
RSV Germania Pfungstadt	0 – 7	Bad Neuenahr
SC Sand	0 – 4	TSV Crailsheim
1. FC Saarbrücken	5 – 2	TuS Niederkirchen	(aet)
Jahn Delmenhorst	1 – 11	Turbine Potsdam

== Second round ==
20 October 2004
Brauweiler Pulheim	2 – 12	Turbine Potsdam
13 November 2004
Gütersloh 2000	1 – 2	Essen-Schönebeck
14 November 2004
1. FC Saarbrücken	1 – 3	Bayern Munich
TuS Köln rrh.	0 – 2	Heike Rheine
Turbine Potsdam II	2 – 3	VfL Wolfsburg
FSV Jägersburg	5 – 6	SC Freiburg	(aet)
FFC Frankfurt	5 – 0	TSV Crailsheim
SC 07 Bad Neuenahr	3 – 1	FSV Frankfurt

== Quarter-finals ==
12 December 2004
Turbine Potsdam	5 – 0	Bad Neuenahr
FFC Frankfurt	3 – 0	Essen-Schönebeck	(aet)
Heike Rheine	0 – 1	Bayern Munich
SC Freiburg	4 – 1	VfL Wolfsburg

== Semi-finals ==
28 March 2005
Turbine Potsdam	2 – 0	Bayern Munich
SC Freiburg	0 – 1	FFC Frankfurt

== Final ==
28 May 2005
17:30 (CEST)

Turbine Potsdam	3 – 0	FFC Frankfurt
Pohlers 23'; Wimbersky 34'; Mittag 80'

Olympic Stadium (Berlin)
Attendance: 30,000
Referee: Miriam Dräger (Kirn-Sulzbach)

1. FFC TURBINE POTSDAM 71:
GK	1	(Germany) Nadine Angerer
DF	(Germany) Britta Carlson
DF	(Germany) Inken Becher
DF	(Germany) Sonja Fuss
MF	(Germany) Navina Omilade
MF	(Germany) Jennifer Zietz
MF	(Germany) Ariane Hingst
MF	(Germany) Viola Odebrecht	(substituted off) 73'
FW	(Germany) Anja Mittag
FW	(Germany) Conny Pohlers
FW	(Germany) Petra Wimbersky	(substituted off) 65'
Substitutes:
MF	(Germany) Karolin Thomas	(substituted on) 73'
FW	(Brazil) Cristiane	(substituted on) 65'
Manager:
(Germany) Bernd Schröder

1. FFC FRANKFURT:
GK	1	(Netherlands) Marleen Wissink
DF	(Germany) Tina Wunderlich
DF	(Germany) Nia Künzer	(substituted off) 59'
MF	(Germany) Judith Affeld
MF	(Germany) Steffi Jones
MF	(Germany) Pia Wunderlich
MF	(Germany) Kerstin Garefrekes
MF	(Germany) Renate Lingor
MF	(Germany) Louise Hansen
FW	(Germany) Katrin Kliehm
FW	(Germany) Birgit Prinz	(substituted off) 26'
Substitutes:
MF	(Germany) Meike Weber	(substituted on) 59'
FW	(Germany) Sandra Albertz	(substituted on) 26'
Manager:
(Germany) Hans-Jürgen Tritschoks
