= 2005–06 DFB-Pokal Frauen =

Tournament details
- Country: Germany
- Teams: 51

Final positions
- Champions: Turbine Potsdam
- Runners-up: FFC Frankfurt

Tournament statistics
- Matches played: 49

The Frauen DFB-Pokal 2005–06 was the 26th season of the cup competition, Germany's second-most important title in women's football. The first round of the tournament was held on 7 August 2005. In the final which was held in Berlin on 29 April 2006 Turbine Potsdam defeated FFC Frankfurt 2–0, thus claiming their third title. It was the third consecutive final contested between Potsdam and Frankfurt.

== First round ==
7 August 2005
SV Eintracht Seekirch	0 – 5	TuS Niederkirchen
1. FC Gera 03	0 – 6	SC Sand
SV 1896 Großdubrau	0 – 3	SG Lütgendortmund
Polizei SV Bremen	1 – 6	FFV Neubrandenburg
SV Fortuna Friedersdorf	0 – 6	TSV Jahn Calden
Magdeburger FFC	0 – 1	Wattenscheid 09	(aet)
GSV Moers	0 – 4	MTV Wolfenbüttel
SV Lurup	0 – 10	Holstein Kiel
SuS Timmel	3 – 1	FC Gütersloh 2000	(aet)
SV Dirmingen	0 – 4	TuS Köln rrh.
SC Regensburg	3 – 0	FF USV Jena
VfR Niederfell	0 – 3	Karlsruher SC
Lokomotive Leipzig	4 – 1	Wacker München
SC Klinge Seckach	0 – 6	1. FC Saarbrücken
SV Jungingen	0 – 4	FC Erzgebirge Aue
DJK Arminia Ibbenbüren	2 – 4	SV Victoria Gersten
SV Titisee	1 – 5	VfL Sindelfingen
VfR Limburg	1 – 3	FSV Jägersburg
SpVgg Oberaußem-Fortuna	–^{*}	Tennis Borussia Berlin

^{*} SpVgg Oberaußem-Fortuna withdrew their team from the competition.

== Second round ==
All teams from the 2004–05 Bundesliga season entered the competition in this round as well as the best team of the 2. Bundesliga 2004–05, Brauweiler Pulheim.

16 October 2005
FFC Frankfurt	3 – 0	SC Freiburg
Essen-Schönebeck	7 – 8	Turbine Potsdam	(pso)
TSV Jahn Calden	1 – 2	Hamburg
SG Lütgendortmund	3 – 1	Tennis Borussia Berlin
Heike Rheine	5 – 0	Holstein Kiel
Lokomotive Leipzig	1 – 8	Bayern Munich
TuS Niederkirchen	0 – 2	1. FC Saarbrücken
FSV Jägersburg	1 – 3	Karlsruher SC
FCR 2001 Duisburg	6 – 0	SuS Timmel
MTV Wolfenbüttel	3 – 5	FFV Neubrandenburg
SV Victoria Gersten	1 – 2	VfL Wolfsburg
Brauweiler Pulheim	2 – 1	SG Wattenscheid 09	(aet)
SC Regensburg	1 – 4	VfL Sindelfingen
FC Erzgebirge Aue	2 – 3	TSV Crailsheim	(aet)
FSV Frankfurt	0 – 7	SC 07 Bad Neuenahr
SC Sand	4 – 0	TuS Köln rrh.

== Third round ==
6 November 2005
FFV Neubrandenburg	0 – 4	TSV Crailsheim
FFC Frankfurt	5 – 0	Brauweiler Pulheim
VfL Wolfsburg	2 – 4	Bayern Munich
Karlsruher SC	1 – 2	SC Sand
VfL Sindelfingen	1 – 2	1. FC Saarbrücken	(aet)
SC 07 Bad Neuenahr	2 – 3	FCR 2001 Duisburg	(aet)
Turbine Potsdam	7 – 1	SG Lütgendortmund
Hamburger SV	2 – 1	Heike Rheine

== Quarter-finals ==
4 December 2005
Turbine Potsdam	10 – 0	SC Sand
FCR 2001 Duisburg	4 – 2	Hamburg	(aet)
1. FC Saarbrücken	0 – 12	FFC Frankfurt
TSV Crailsheim	0 – 7	Bayern Munich

== Semi-finals ==
26 March 2006
FCR 2001 Duisburg	1 – 2	FFC Frankfurt
Turbine Potsdam	3 – 1	Bayern Munich

== Final ==
29 April 2006
16:30 (CEST)

Turbine Potsdam	2 – 0	FFC Frankfurt
I. Kerschowski 79'; Wimbersky 82'

Olympic Stadium (Berlin)
Attendance: 20,000
Referee: Anja Kunick (Lissa)

1. FFC TURBINE POTSDAM 71:
GK	(Germany) Nadine Angerer
DF	(Germany) Peggy Kuznik		(substituted off) 71'
DF	(Germany) Inken Becher
DF	(Germany) Babett Peter
MF	(Germany) Navina Omilade
MF	(Germany) Ariane Hingst
MF	(Germany) Britta Carlson
MF	(Germany) Jennifer Zietz	Booked
FW	(Germany) Petra Wimbersky
FW	(Germany) Conny Pohlers		(substituted off) 77'
FW	(Germany) Anja Mittag		(substituted off) 90'
Substitutes:
MF	(Germany) Karolin Thomas		(substituted on) 64'
FW	(Germany) Isabel Kerschowski		(substituted on) 77'
FW	(Albania) Aferdita Podvorica		(substituted on) 90'
Manager:
(Germany) Bernd Schröder

1. FFC FRANKFURT:
GK	1	(Netherlands) Marleen Wissink
DF	(Germany) Steffi Jones
DF	(Germany) Tina Wunderlich
DF	(Germany) Nia Künzer
DF	(Germany) Katrin Kliehm
MF	(Germany) Kerstin Garefrekes
MF	(Germany) Louise Hansen
MF	(Germany) Renate Lingor	Booked
MF	(Germany) Judith Affeld	(substituted off) 87'
FW	(Germany) Sandra Smisek	(substituted off) 78'
FW	(Germany) Sandra Albertz	(substituted off) 67'
Substitutes:
MF	(Germany) Saskia Bartusiak	(substituted on) 87'
FW	(Germany) Patrizia Barucha	(substituted on) 78'
MF	(Germany) Meike Weber	(substituted on) 67'
Manager:
(Germany) Hans-Jürgen Tritschoks

MATCH RULES

- 90 minutes.
- 30 minutes of extra-time if necessary, except in the final.
- Penalty shootout if scores still level.
- Seven named substitutes
- Maximum of 3 substitutions.
