= Saskia Bartusiak =

German footballer (born 1982)

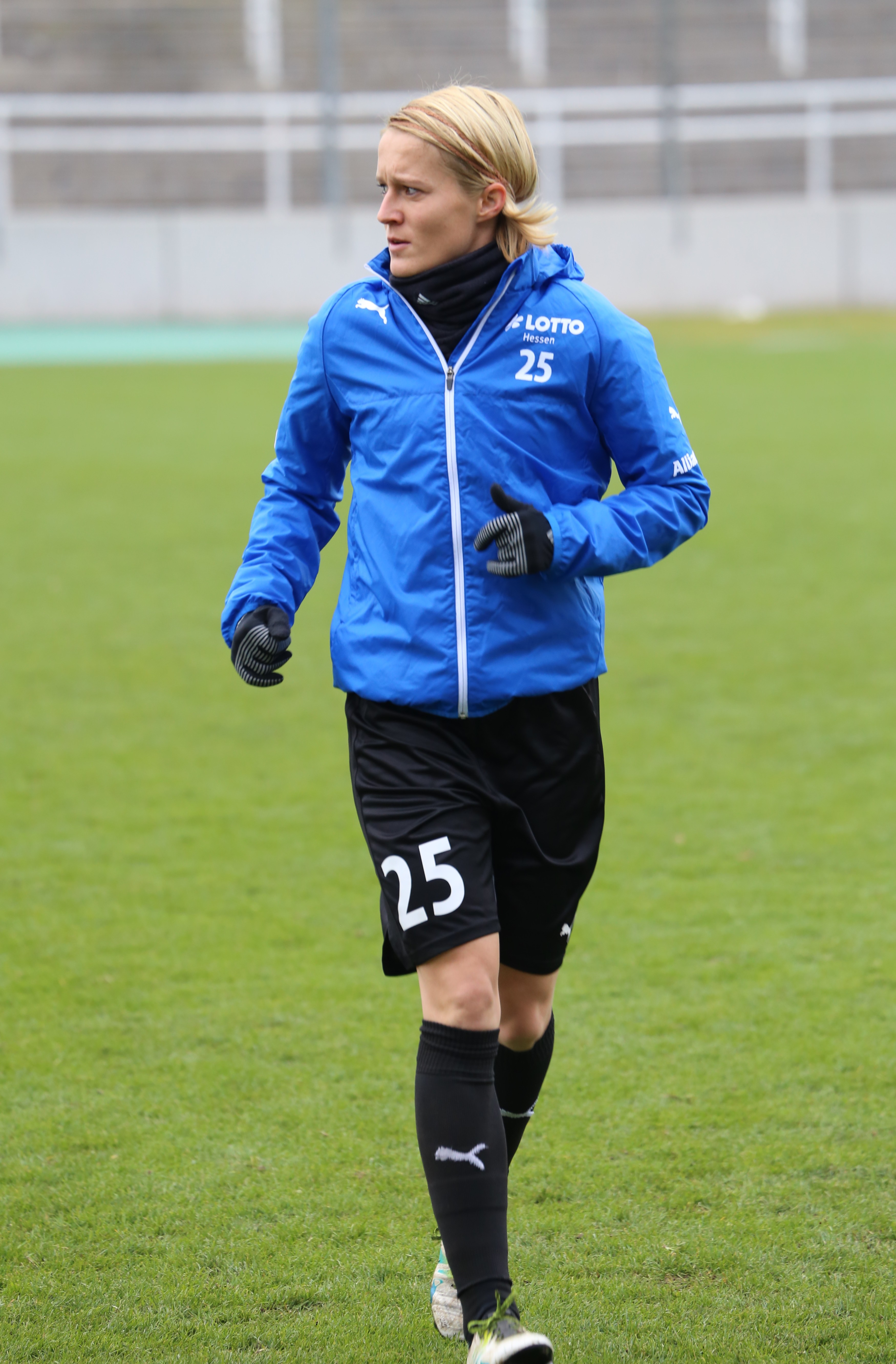
- Bartusiak before the game against Bayern Munich in November 2016

Personal information
- Full name: Saskia Bartusiak
- Date of birth: 9 September 1982 (age 44)
- Place of birth: Frankfurt, West Germany
- Height: 1.70 m (5 ft 7 in)
- Position: Centre back

Youth career
- –1996: FV 09 Eschersheim
- 1996–2000: FSV Frankfurt

Senior career*
Years	Team	Apps	(Gls)
2000–2005	FSV Frankfurt	113	(26)
2005–2017	1. FFC Frankfurt	151	(14)

International career^{‡}
	Germany U18	1	(0)
	Germany U21	11	(0)
2007–2016	Germany	101	(3)
Medal record
FIFA Women's World Cup
Gold medal – first place	2007 China	Team
Olympic Games
Bronze medal – third place	2008 Beijing	Team
Gold medal – first place	2016 Rio de Janeiro	Team
UEFA Women's Championship
Gold medal – first place	2009 Finland	Team
Gold medal – first place	2013 Sweden	Team
- * Club domestic league appearances and goals as of 21 September 2013 ‡ National team caps and goals as of 19 August 2016

Saskia Bartusiak (born 9 September 1982) is a German retired footballer. She played as a centre back.

== Career ==
=== Club ===
Bartusiak began her career at FV 09 Eschersheim. In 1996, she left the club to join FSV Frankfurt where she made her Bundesliga debut. After five years, she transferred to local rivals 1. FFC Frankfurt in 2005. Playing in central defence, Bartusiak has been an important player for FFC Frankfurt's success in the following years. She won two Bundesliga championships and three German Cup titles at the club. In the 2005–06 and 2007–08 season she also won the UEFA Women's Cup with Frankfurt.

=== International ===
Bartusiak made her debut in the German national team in a friendly against the Netherlands in April 2007. She was part of Germany's winning team at the 2007 FIFA Women's World Cup, appearing in one match, the opening game against Argentina. Bartusiak has since been called up for all major tournaments for Germany. She again was a reserve player at the 2008 Summer Olympics, where she won a bronze medal. At the 2009 European Championship, Bartusiak became a regular starter for Germany, winning her first European title. She has been called up for Germany's 2011 FIFA Women's World Cup squad.

She was named captain of the German team on 17 September 2015.

She announced her retirement from the national team in August 2016 after leading Germany to its first Olympic gold medal in women's football.

==== International goals ====
Scores and results list Germany's goal tally first:

Bartusiak – goals for Germany
#	Date	Location	Opponent	Score	Result	Competition
1.	27 November 2013	Osijek, Croatia	Croatia	8–0	8–0	2015 FIFA Women's World Cup qualification
2.	22 July 2016	Paderborn, Germany	Ghana	5–0	11–0	Friendly
3.	6 August 2016	São Paulo, Brazil	Australia	2–2	2–2	2016 Summer Olympic

== Honours ==
1. FFC Frankfurt

- UEFA Women's Cup: 2005–06, 2007–08, 2014–15
- Bundesliga: 2006–07, 2007–08
- German Cup: 2006–07, 2007–08, 2010–11, 2013–14

Germany

- FIFA World Cup: 2007
- UEFA European Football Championship: 2009, 2013
- Summer Olympic Games: Bronze medal, 2008, Gold medal, 2016
- UEFA U-18 Women's Championship: 2000
- Algarve Cup: 2012

Individual

- Silbernes Lorbeerblatt: 2007, 2016
- UEFA Women's Championship All-Star Team: 2013
- FIFA Women's World Cup All Star Team: 2011
