= 2013–14 DFB-Pokal Frauen =

Tournament details
- Country: Germany

Final positions
- Champions: 1. FFC Frankfurt
- Runners-up: SGS Essen

Tournament statistics
- Matches played: 55
- Goals scored: 272 (4.95 per match)
- Top goal scorer(s): Isabelle Meyer (7 goals)

The DFB-Pokal 2013–14 was the 34th season of the cup competition, Germany's second-most important title in women's football.

== Participating clubs ==
The following teams qualified for the DFB-Pokal:

BUNDESLIGA all clubs of 2012–13	2. BUNDESLIGA; 19 of 24 clubs of 2012–13 (Note: Being second teams FCR 2001 Duisburg II, FFC Frankfurt II, Jena II, Bayern Munich II, and Turbine Potsdam II may not compete in the cup.)	REGIONALLIGA; 4 of 5 clubs promoted in 2012–13	REGIONAL CUPS; Winners of 2012–13 (with league level)
Bayer Leverkusen; BV Cloppenburg; FC Bayern Munich; FCR 2001 Duisburg; SGS Essen; 1. FFC Frankfurt; SC Freiburg; 1899 Hoffenheim; FF USV Jena; VfL Sindelfingen; 1. FFC Turbine Potsdam; VfL Wolfsburg	SV Bardenbach; FFV Leipzig; FSV Gütersloh 2009; Herforder SV; Holstein Kiel; Magdeburger FFC; Blau-Weiß Hohen Neuendorf; SV Meppen; Werder Bremen; 1. FC Lübars; ETSV Würzburg; SC Sand; SC 07 Bad Neuenahr; SV 67 Weinberg; TSV Crailsheim; TuS Wörrstadt; VfL Bochum; 1. FC Köln; 1. FC Saarbrücken; 1. FFC 08 Niederkirchen	FC Viktoria 1889 Berlin; VfL Bochum; SV 67 Weinberg; TuS Wörrstadt	Baden: Karlsruher SC (III); Bayern: FFC Wacker München (III)^{R} Berlin: BSC Marzahn (III)^{R} Brandenburg: Potsdamer Kickers (V); Bremen: ATS Buntentor (IV); Hamburg: FC Bergedorf 85 (III); Hessen: Eintracht Frankfurt (III); Mecklenburg-Vorpommern: 1. FC Neubrandenburg 04 (III); Mittelrhein: SC Fortuna Köln (IV); Niederrhein: GSV Moers (III); Niedersachsen: TSG Burg Gretesch (III)^{R} Rheinland: TuS Issel (III)^{R} Saarland: FSV Viktoria Jägersburg (III); Sachsen: 1. FFC Fortuna Dresden-Rähnitz (III); Sachsen-Anhalt: Hallescher FC (III); Schleswig-Holstein: SV Henstedt-Ulzburg (IV); Südbaden: Hegauer FV (III); Südwest: TSV Schott Mainz (IV); Thüringen: 1. FFV Erfurt (III); Westfalen: Sportfreunde Siegen (III)^{R} Württemberg: TV Derendingen (IV)

^{R}. As runners-up, winner already qualified.

== Results ==
=== First round ===
The draw for the first round was held on 12 July 2013. The eight best clubs of the previous Bundesliga season were awarded byes for the first round. As in previous years, the first round is drawn in northern and a southern group separately.

31 August
1. FC Neubrandenburg 04	0 – 11	FF USV Jena
SV Bardenbach	0 – 13	TSG 1899 Hoffenheim
Holstein Kiel	2 – 4	Herforder SV
Eintracht Frankfurt	0 – 4	1. FFC Niederkirchen
GSV 1910 Moers	1 – 0	TuS Wörrstadt
Karlsruher SC	3 – 6	VfL Bochum
TV Derendingen	0 – 4	1. FC Köln
FSV Viktoria Jägersburg	2 – 2 (5 - 6p)	ETSV Würzburg
1 September 2013
1. FFC Fortuna Dresden Rähnitz	0 – 4	BV Cloppenburg
FFC Wacker München	1 – 4	SC 07 Bad Neuenahr
SC Fortuna Köln	0 – 1 (a.e.t.)	VfL Sindelfingen
FFC Oldesloe	0 – 10	SV Meppen
Hallescher FC	0 – 4	FSV Gütersloh
FC Bergedorf	0 – 1 (a.e.t.)	SV BW Hohen Neuendorf
SV Henstedt-Ulzburg	2 – 3 (a.e.t.)	1. FC Lübars
1. FFV Erfurt	2 – 3	Magdeburger FFC
1. FFC Recklinghausen	1 – 14	Werder Bremen
ATS Buntentor	1 – 5	FFV Leipzig
BSC Marzahn	0 – 3	TSG Burg Gretesch
Hegauer FV	1 – 3	SV Weinberg
SF Siegen	0 – 9	SC Sand
TSV Schott Mainz	2 – 4	TSV Crailsheim
Potsdamer Kickers 94	2 – 5	FC Viktoria 89 Berlin
TuS Issel	0 – 4	1. FC Saarbrücken

=== Second round ===
24 winners of the previous round join eight clubs with a bye in the first round. Draw was held on 8 September with a northern and southern section separately.

28 September
TSG Burg Gretesch	1 – 9	VfL Wolfsburg
BV Cloppenburg	6 – 0	Magdeburger FFC
FC Viktoria 89 Berlin	0 – 2	SV Meppen
FCR 2001 Duisburg	6 – 0	Blau-Weiß Hohen Neuendorf
GSV 1910 Moers	0 – 9	Bayer Leverkusen
SC Freiburg	3 – 1	VfL Sindelfingen
1. FC Saarbrücken	3 – 0	1. FFC 08 Niederkirchen
1. FC Köln	2 – 0	1899 Hoffenheim
29 September 2013
SGS Essen	3 – 2	1. FFC Turbine Potsdam
FSV Gütersloh 2009	1 – 4	FF USV Jena
1. FC Lübars	1 – 2	Werder Bremen
Herforder SV	0 – 0 (4 - 5p)	FFV Leipzig
SC 07 Bad Neuenahr	0 – 5	1. FFC Frankfurt
ETSV Würzburg	0 – 4	SC Sand
VfL Bochum	3 – 1 (a.e.t.)	SV Weinberg
TSV Crailsheim	0 – 7	FC Bayern Munich

=== Round of 16 ===
Draw was held on 5 October.

16 November 2013
1. FFC Frankfurt	1 – 0	VfL Wolfsburg
1. FC Köln	2 – 0	FC Bayern Munich
17 November 2013
SC Sand	6 – 0	FCR 2001 Duisburg
SC Freiburg	7 – 0	FFV Leipzig
Werder Bremen	3 – 1	VfL Bochum
Bayer Leverkusen	1 – 2	BV Cloppenburg
SGS Essen	4 – 2	1. FC Saarbrücken
SV Meppen	1 – 2	FF USV Jena

=== Quarterfinals ===
Three teams from the second league remain. The draw was held on 19 November 2013.

15 December 2013
SC Freiburg	1 – 0	BV Cloppenburg
Werder Bremen	0 – 8	1. FFC Frankfurt
FF USV Jena	0 – 2	SC Sand
SGS Essen	5 – 2	1. FC Köln

=== Semifinals ===
Sand was still representing the second Bundesliga, leading it at the time of draw.

12 April 2014
SC Freiburg	0–1 a.e.t.	SGS Essen
13 April 2014
1. FFC Frankfurt	2–0	SC Sand

=== Final ===
The final was played on 17 May 2014 in Köln. Essen reached the final for the first time in their club history.

17 May 2014
16:30

SGS Essen	0–3	1. FFC Frankfurt
	Report	Ando 3'; Kuznik 28'; Laudehr 36'

RheinEnergieStadion, Cologne
Attendance: 16,621
Referee: Marina Wozniak (Herne)

Essen	Frankfurt

GK	1	(Germany) Lisa Weiß (c)
RB	16	(Germany) Jacqueline Klasen
CB	2	(Netherlands) Dominique Janssen	(substituted off) 46'
CB	6	(Germany) Vanessa Martini	(substituted off) 65'
LB	11	(Germany) Irini Ioannidou
CM	23	(Germany) Sara Doorsoun-Khajeh
CM	21	(Germany) Ina Mester
RW	7	(Germany) Sarah Freutel	(substituted off) 77'
AM	10	(Germany) Linda Dallmann
LW	5	(Germany) Sabrina Dörpinghaus
CF	13	(Germany) Charline Hartmann
Substitutions:
GK	20	(Germany) Kari Närdemann
MF	4	(Germany) Christina Dierkes
MF	14	(Kosovo) Geldona Morina
MF	18	(Germany) Lena Ostermeier
FW	24	(Germany) Lea Schüller	(substituted in) 77'
FW	8	(Germany) Madeline Gier	(substituted in) 65'
FW	9	(Germany) Isabelle Wolf	(substituted in) 46'
Manager:
(Germany) Markus Högner

GK	1	(Germany) Desirée Schumann
RB	23	(Germany) Bianca Schmidt
CB	27	(Germany) Peggy Kuznik	(yellow card) 83'
CB	25	(Germany) Saskia Bartusiak
LB	11	(Germany) Simone Laudehr
RM	18	(Germany) Kerstin Garefrekes (c)
CM	7	(Germany) Melanie Behringer
CM	10	(Germany) Dzsenifer Marozsán		(substituted off) 88'
LM	21	(Switzerland) Ana-Maria Crnogorčević
CF	14	(Japan) Kozue Ando		(substituted off) 90'
CF	19	(Germany) Fatmire Bajramaj		(substituted off) 81'
Substitutions:
GK	31	(Germany) Anke Preuß
DF	2	(Mexico) Alina Garciamendez		(substituted in) 88'
DF	4	(Germany) Babett Peter
DF	12	(Germany) Meike Weber		(substituted in) 81'
MF	15	(Germany) Svenja Huth
MF	24	(Japan) Asuna Tanaka		(substituted in) 90'
FW	17	(Germany) Jessica Wich
Manager:
(England) Colin Bell

Assistant referees:
Sandra Föhrdes
Annika Paszehr

== Top scorers ==
Rank	Scorer	Club	Goals
1	(Switzerland) Isabelle Meyer	SC Sand	7
2	(Germany) Kerstin Garefrekes	1. FFC Frankfurt	6
2	(Germany) Stephanie Goddard	SV Werder Bremen	6
4	(Germany) Theresa Panfil	Bayer 04 Leverkusen	5
5	(New Zealand) Amber Hearn	FF USV Jena	4
5	(Croatia) Iva Landeka	FF USV Jena	4
5	(Italy) Ilaria Mauro	SC Sand	4
5	(Germany) Christine Veth	SC Sand	4
5	(Germany) Maren Wallenhorst	SV Werder Bremen	4
5	(Poland) Agnieszka Winczo	BV Cloppenburg	4
