= Dagmar Damková =

Czech football referee (born 1974)

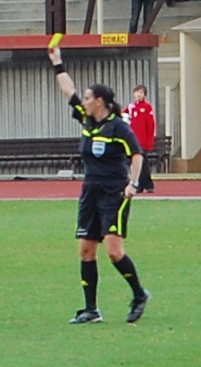
- Born: 29 December 1974 (age 51); Plzeň, Czechoslovakia
- Other occupation: English Teacher

Domestic
Years	League	Role
2005–2011	Czech First League	Referee

International
Years	League	Role
1999–2011	FIFA	Referee

Dagmar Damková (born 29 December 1974) is a Czech former football referee, ex-chair of the FAČR referees committee, former member of the executive committee of the FAČR, ex-chair of the Steering Committee for Bohemia, ex-chair of the Czech Women's Football committee, member of the UEFA referees committee and former member of the FIFA referees committee.

== Early life ==
Damková graduated from the Faculty of Education at the University of West Bohemia with a degree in English language.

== Career ==
Damková has been an international referee since 1999, her first match being Belarus against Moldova on 17 April 1999. She refereed the final at the 2008 Olympics, the final of the UEFA Women's Euro 2009 and the 2011 UEFA Women's Champions League Final. She is also the first woman to referee in the Czech First League.

Damková refereed three matches at the 2007 FIFA Women's World Cup in China, including the semi-final between Germany and Norway, becoming the first Czech woman to referee at such a level. She also refereed at the 2011 FIFA Women's World Cup in Germany.

Damková started refereeing in the Czech First League in the 2005–06 season. Following the match between Teplice and Slavia Prague on 27 November 2006, Damková had a 32-month break from the league after failing a fitness test, but returned in 2009. She refereed her last match in the Czech First League on 7 August 2011, taking charge of the match between Mladá Boleslav and Slovácko.

On 21 October 2020, Damková resigned from the executive committee of the Czech Football Association and as chair of the Steering Committee for Bohemia. The move follows the resignation of her husband Roman Berbr, who was arrested in a scandal surrounding alleged match fixing.

== Personal life ==
Damková is married to former agent of the communist secret police StB, former Czech football referee and former vice-chairman of the FAČR Roman Berbr.

Preceded by (Slovakia) Saša Ihringová	2009 UEFA Women's Euro Final (Czech Republic) Dagmar Damková	Succeeded by (Romania) Cristina Dorcioman
