= Stefanie Draws =

German footballer (born 1989)

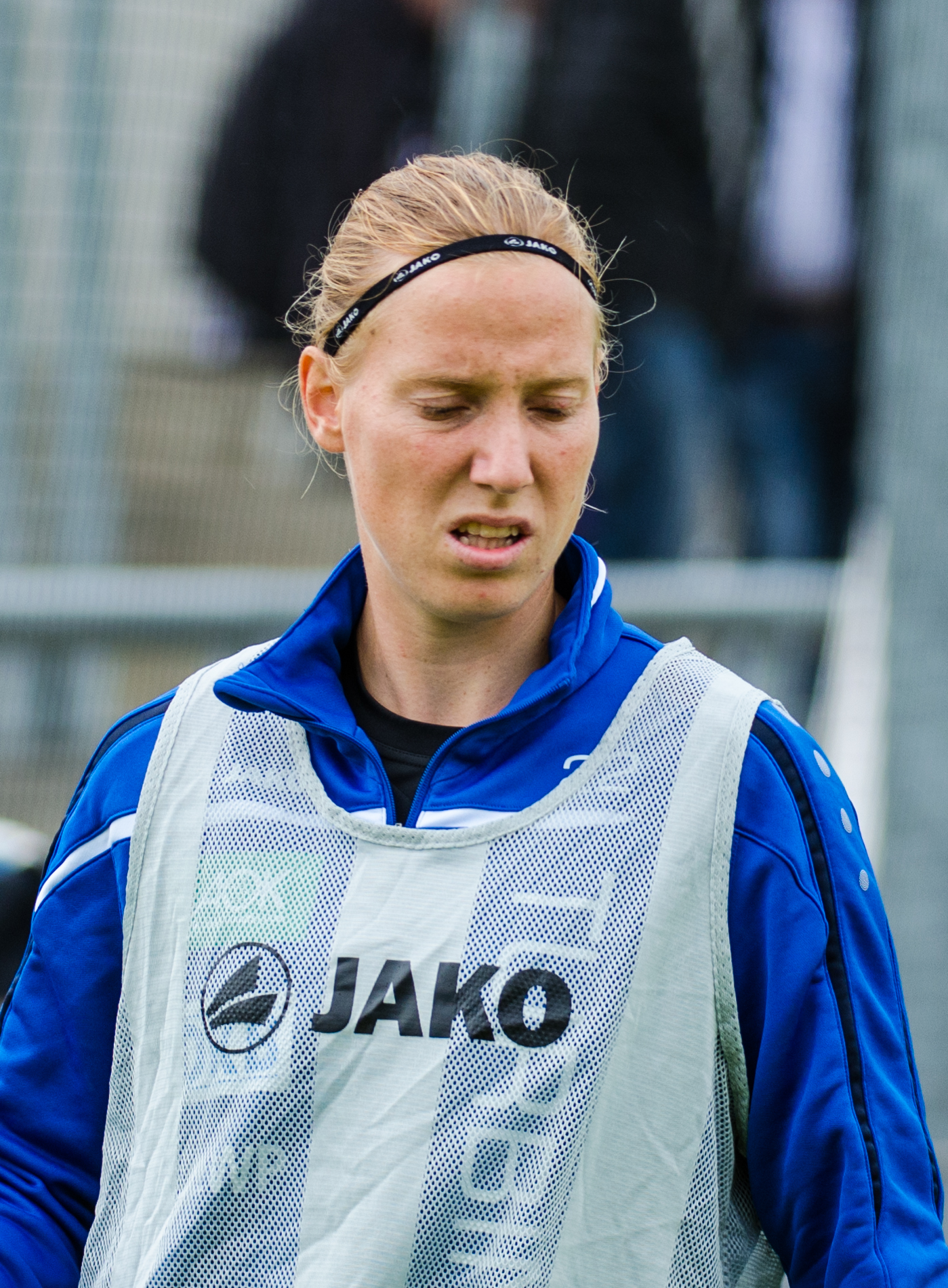
- Draws playing for Turbine Potsdam in 2015

Personal information
- Full name: Stefanie Draws
- Date of birth: October 16, 1989 (age 37)
- Place of birth: Rostock, East Germany
- Height: 1.74 m (5 ft 9 in)
- Position: Defender

Youth career
- 1995–1998: Grün-Weiß Rostock
- 1998–2003: FSV Dummerstorf 47
- 2003–2006: FFV Neubrandenburg

Senior career*
Years	Team	Apps	(Gls)
2005–2006	FV Neubrandenburg	19	(3)
2006–2017	1.FFC Turbine Potsdam	127	(7)
Total		146	(10)

International career^{‡}
2004–2005	Germany U15	4	(0)
2006	Germany U17	24	(2)
2006–2007	Germany U19	10	(0)
2007–2008	Germany U20	1	(0)
2012	Germany U23	9	(0)
- * Club domestic league appearances and goals ‡ National team caps and goals as of 10 September 2014

Stefanie Draws (born 16 October 1989 in Rostock) is a German former football defender.

== Club career ==
She began her football career at the age of five at Rostocker FC. Then, she went to FSV Dummerstorf 47 and joined the FFV Neubrandenburg in 2003. At age 15 in the 2005/06 season, she became a permanent member of the first team which plays in the second division. Draws was offered to 1. FFC Turbine Potsdam and joined the Turbine in 2006. In the same year she was awarded the Fritz Walter Medal in bronze. She made her first game for the Turbine in a UEFA Women's Cup match against the Belgian champions KFC Rapide Wezemaal.

She won her first national title on January 12, 2008 when she won the DFB indoor cup with the Turbines. In March 2008, she suffered a cruciate ligament rupture during a U-20 national cup game. In 2009, she and her team won the DFB indoor cup and then the German championship. In the newly created women's Champions League, Draws scored her first international goal for the turbines in the first game against the Finnish champions FC Honka Espoo. In the summer of 2017, the defender ended her active career with Bundesliga club 1. FFC Turbine Potsdam.

== International career ==
In 2004 she completed her first international match in the U-15 national team. With the U-19 national team, she became European champion in Iceland in 2007.

In May 2017, at the age of 27, Draws announced her retirement from professional football.
