= Irini Ioannidou =

German footballer

Personal information
- Full name: Irini Ioannidou
- Date of birth: 11 June 1991 (age 35)
- Place of birth: Essen, Germany
- Height: 1.65 m (5 ft 5 in)
- Position: Midfielder

Youth career
- DJK Juspo Essen-West
- FCR 2001 Duisburg

Senior career*
Years	Team	Apps	(Gls)
2007–2010	FCR 2001 Duisburg	9	(0)
2010–2021	SGS Essen	153	(15)
2021	1. Köln	0	(0)

International career
	Germany U15	2	(0)
	Germany U19	2	(0)
	Germany U23	1	(1)
- * Club domestic league appearances and goals

Irini Ioannidou is a German football midfielder of Greek descent.

As an Under-19 international she took part in the 2010 U-19 European Championship for Germany.

== Titles ==
- 1 UEFA Women's Cup (2009)
- 2 German Cups (2009, 2010)
