= Britta Carlson =

German former football midfielder

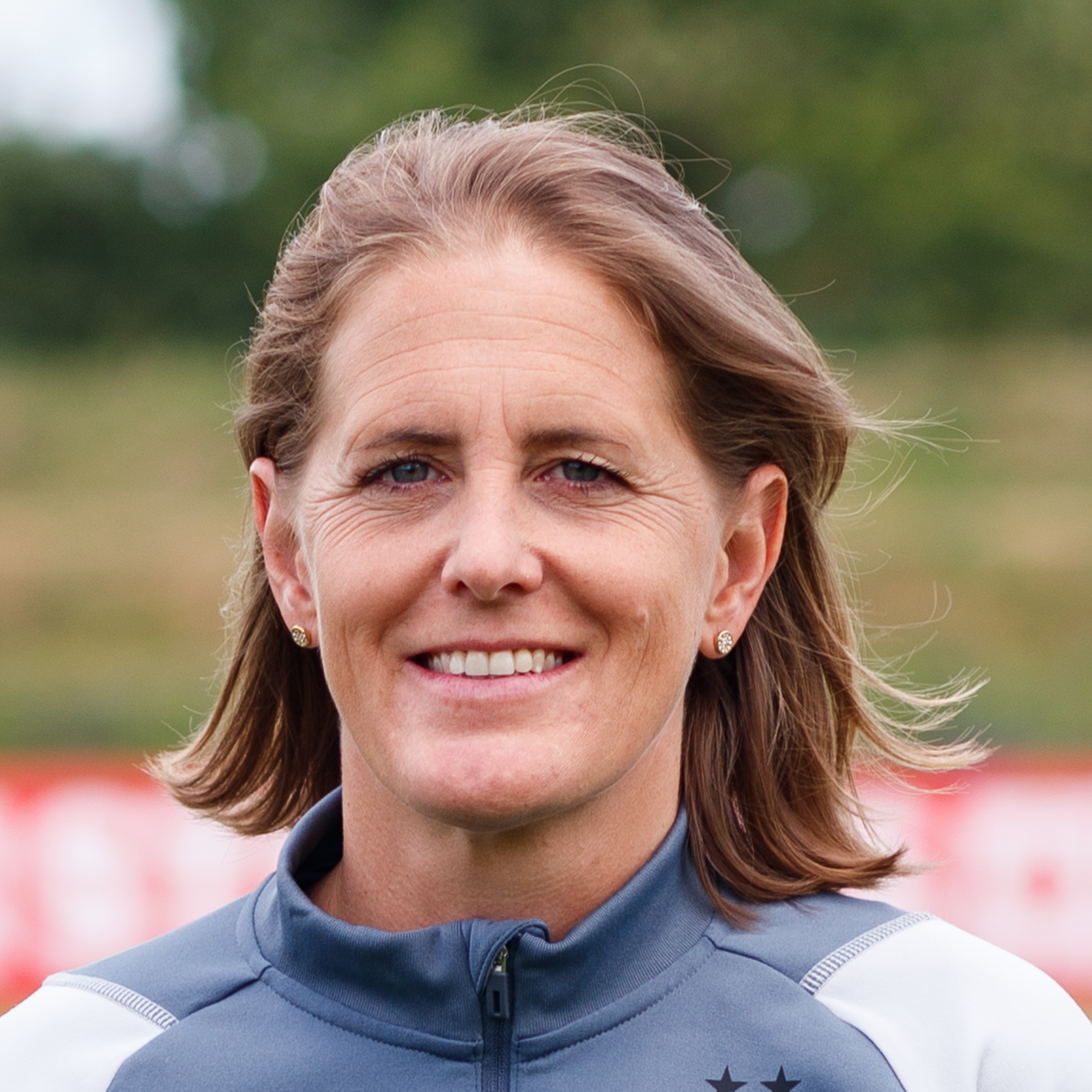
- Britta Carlson in 2023

Personal information
- Full name: Britta Carlson
- Date of birth: 3 March 1978 (age 48)
- Place of birth: Kiel, West Germany
- Height: 1.67 m (5 ft 5 1/2 in)
- Positions: Defender; midfielder

Team information
- Current team: 1. FC Köln (manager)

Youth career
- TSV Altenholz
- SV Friedrichsort

Senior career*
Years	Team	Apps	(Gls)
- Schmalfelder SV
–2004	Hamburger SV		
2004–2007	Turbine Potsdam		
2007–2008	VfL Wolfsburg		

International career
2004–2007	Germany	31	(4)

Managerial career
- 2025–: 1. FC Köln
Medal record
Women's football
Representing Germany
UEFA Women's Championship
Winner	2005 England
- * Club domestic league appearances and goals

Britta Carlson (born 3 March 1978) is a German professional football manager and former player. She is currently in charge of Frauen-Bundesliga club 1. FC Köln. She was capped 31 times for the Germany women's national football team.

== Club career ==
Carlson won the UEFA Women's Cup with Turbine Potsdam in 2005, as well as the 2006 Bundesliga and the Frauen DFB Pokal in 2005 and 2006. In October 2008, following a season with Wolfsburg, Carlson retired from football. She had been plagued by a persistent knee injury.

She subsequently joined the coaching staff at Wolfsburg and served as an ambassador for the 2011 FIFA Women's World Cup in Germany.

== International career ==
In 31 appearances for the Germany senior team, Carlson scored four goals and collected a winners' medal from UEFA Women's Euro 2005. Her debut came on 4 March 2004 in a 1–0 defeat to China in Fürth, and she won her last cap on 12 March 2007 in a 3–0 win over Denmark.

Carlson was named as an alternate for the 2004 Olympics in Athens, and was disappointed to be overlooked for the 2007 FIFA Women's World Cup squad.

== Honours ==
Turbine Potsdam

- Frauen-Bundesliga: 2005–06
- DFB-Pokal Frauen: 2004–05, 2005–06
- UEFA Women's Cup: 2004–05

Germany

- UEFA Women's Championship: 2005
