= Kirsi Heikkinen =

Finnish football referee

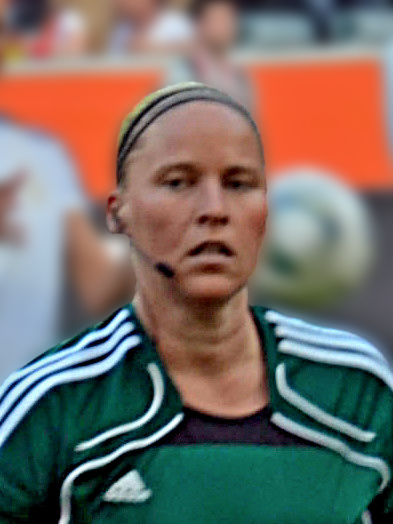
- Heikkinen in the 2011 World Cup's Germany–France group stage game
- Born: Kirsi Savolainen; 26 September 1978 (age 47); Espoo, Finland
- Occupation: women's football referee
- Years active: 2005–2013
- Known for: FIFA Women's World Cup referee

Kirsi Heikkinen (née Savolainen, born in Espoo, 26 September 1978) is a Finnish women's football referee. She has taken part in the 2009 European Championship, the 2011 World Cup and the 2012 Summer Olympics, and she refereed the final of the 2010 Champions League, the 2010 U–17 World Cup and the 2010 Algarve Cup.

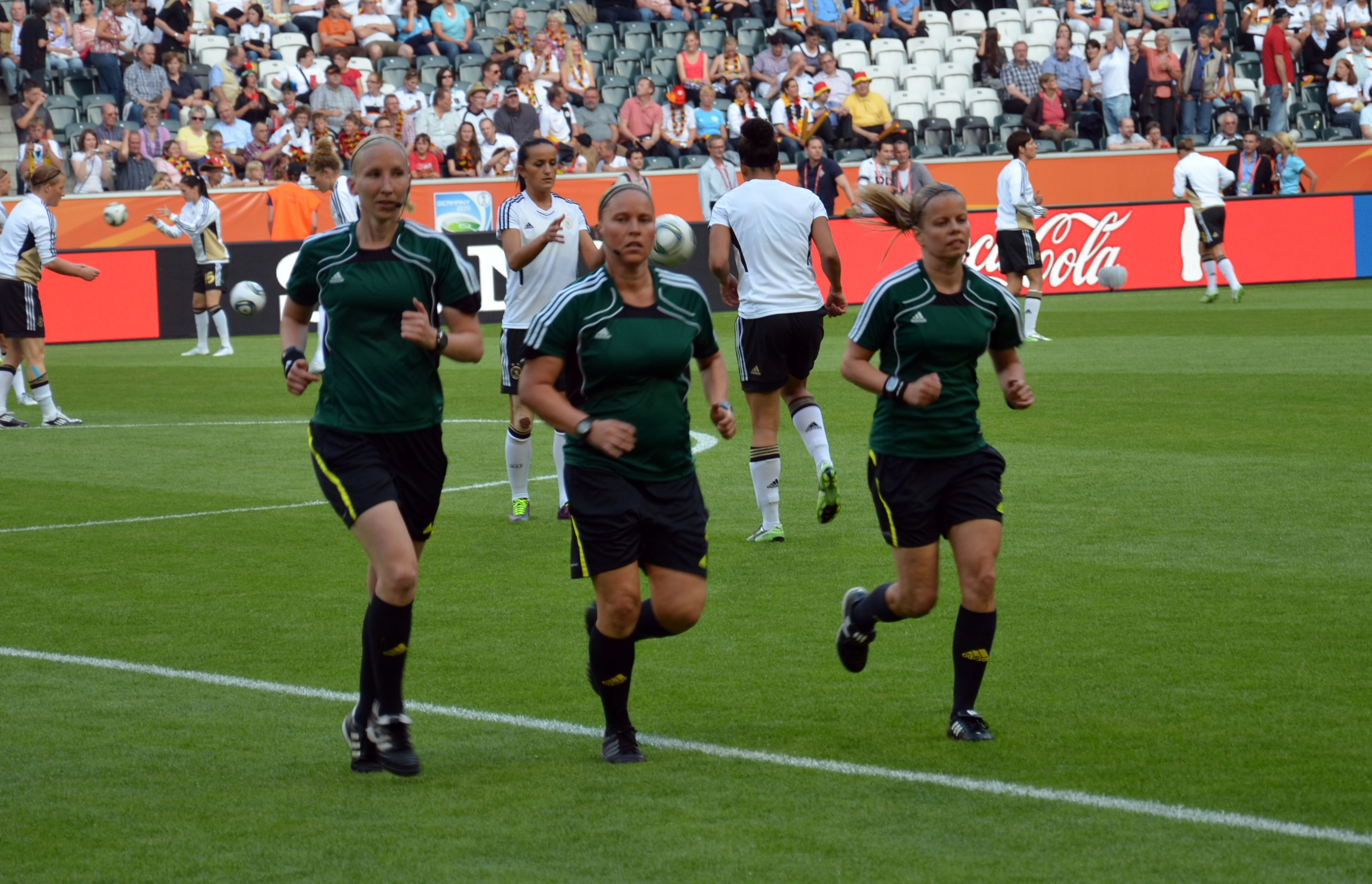
Heikkinen (centre) at the 2011 FIFA Women's World Cup in Germany.

== International competition record ==
=== National team competitions ===
Heikkinen refereed her first international game, a Sweden 1–1 Canada friendly, on 28 May 2005.

She was the host country's referee in the 2009 European Championship and refereed the Sweden 3–0 Russia and Germany 1–0 Iceland group stage games, the Netherlands 0–0 France quarterfinals and the Germany 3–1 Norway semifinals.

In the 2010 U–17 World Cup she refereed the Nigeria 3–2 North Korea and Japan 6–0 New Zealand group stage games and the South Korea 3–3 Japan final.

In the 2011 World Cup's UEFA qualification she refereed the Scotland 0–1 Denmark, Poland 0-0 Hungary, Austria 0–4 England games in the regular stage and the Italy 0–0 (3–0) Ukraine Repechage's 2nd leg in the play-offs. In the final tournament she refereed the Japan 2–1 New Zealand and Germany 4–2 France group stage games and the United States 3–1 France semifinal. In the second game she sent off French goalkeeper Sapowicz with 25 minutes remaining and a 2–1 score for Germany.

In the 2012 Summer Olympics' AFC qualification she refereed the Australia 1–0 China game. In the final tournament she refereed the Japan 2–1 Canada group stage match and the Japan 2–0 Brazil quarterfinals.

In the 2013 European Championship's qualification she refereed the Italy 1–0 Poland, Switzerland 4–3 Spain and Iceland 3–1 Norway games, signaling one penalty for Italy, Spain and Iceland each; the former was missed.

=== Club competitions ===
She refereed the 2010 Champions League's Turbine Potsdam 0–0 Lyon final, won by Turbine on penalties.

In the 2012 Champions League she refereed the Rossiyanka 1–0 (3–0) Twente Round of 32's 2nd leg, the Göteborg 3–2 (4–2) Fortuna Hjørring Round of 16's 2nd leg and the Frankfurt 2–0 (4–1) Arsenal semifinals' 2nd leg.

In the 2013 Champions League she has refereed the Brøndby 3–3 (3–5) Stabæk Round of 32's 2nd leg and the Zorky Krasnogorsk 0–9 (0–11) Lyon Round of 16's 1st leg, signaling one penalty for Brøndby and Olympique each. She will referee the Rossiyanka – Wolfsburg quarterfinals' 2nd leg on 28 March 2013.
