= Inka Wesely =

German former football defender (born 1991)

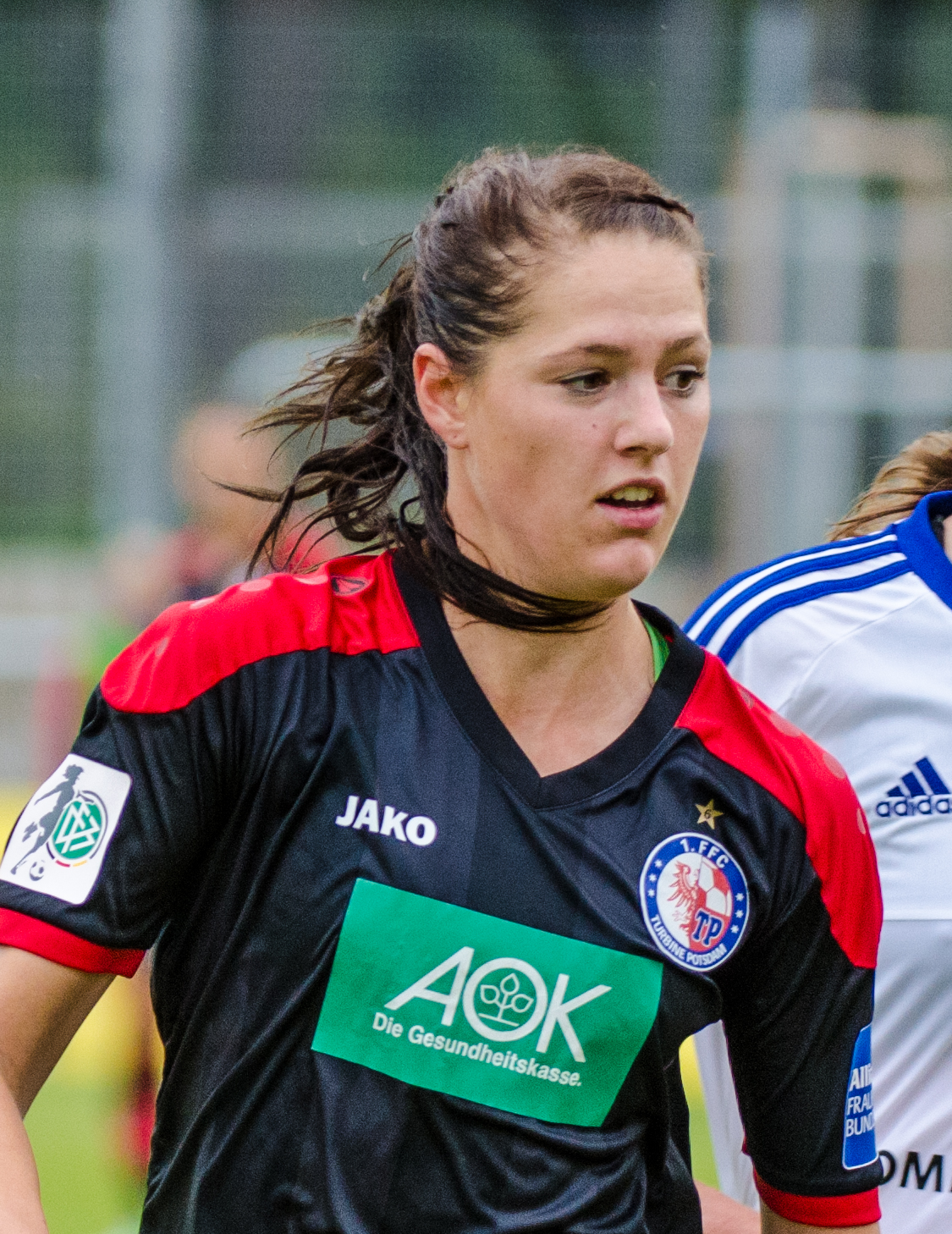
- Wesely playing for Turbine Potsdam in September 2015

Personal information
- Full name: Inka Wesely
- Date of birth: 10 May 1991 (age 35)
- Place of birth: Wesel, Germany
- Height: 1.77 m (5 ft 10 in)
- Position: Defender

Senior career*
Years	Team	Apps	(Gls)
2007–2010	SG Essen-Schönebeck	37	(1)
2010–2017	Turbine Potsdam	68	(8)
2011–2017	Turbine Potsdam II	20	(9)
Total		125	(18)

International career^{‡}
2007–2008	Germany U17	22	(0)
2009–2010	Germany U19	5	(0)
2010	Germany U20	3	(0)
2012	Germany U23	1	(0)
- * Club domestic league appearances and goals as of 18 August 2017 ‡ National team caps and goals as of 2012

Inka Wesely is a German former football defender.

== Club career ==
Throughout her career, Wesely repeatedly suffered with anterior cruciate ligament injuries. It has been remarked by Sportbuzzer that she is adept at heading.

== International career ==
As an under-19 international she won the 2010 U-20 World Cup.

== Honours ==
1. FFC Turbine Potsdam

- Bundesliga: Winner 2011, 2012

International

- FIFA U-20 Women's World Cup: Winner 2010
- UEFA Women's Under-17 Championship: Winner 2008
- FIFA U-17 Women's World Cup Third place 2008
