= Petra Wimbersky =

German footballer

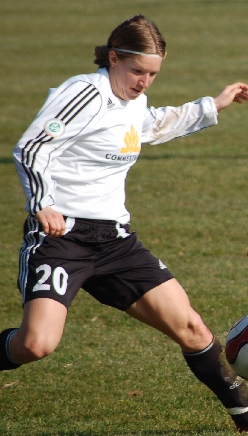

Personal information
- Full name: Petra Wimbersky
- Date of birth: 9 November 1982 (age 43)
- Place of birth: Munich, West Germany
- Height: 1.64 m (5 ft 4 1/2 in)
- Position: Striker

Youth career
- TSV Ottobrunn
- SpVgg Unterhaching

Senior career*
Years	Team	Apps	(Gls)
1999–2002	Bayern Munich	39	(25)
2002–2006	Turbine Potsdam	82	(59)
2006–2010	1. FFC Frankfurt	81	(49)
2010–2012	Bayern Munich	36	(9)

International career
2001–2008	Germany	70	(16)
- * Club domestic league appearances and goals

Petra Wimbersky (born 9 November 1982) is a former German football striker. After four years at 1. FFC Frankfurt she returned to her former club Bayern Munich. She also played for the German national team.

She ended her career in 2012.

== Honours ==
Turbine Potsdam

- UEFA Cup: Winner 2004–05
- Fußball-Bundesliga: 2003–04, 2005–06
- DFB-Pokal: 2003–04, 2004–05, 2005–06

1. FFC Frankfurt

- UEFA Cup: Winner 2007–08
- Fußball-Bundesliga: 2006–07, 2007–08
- DFB-Pokal: 2006–07, 2007–08

Bayern Munich

- DFB-Pokal: 2011–12
- Bundesliga Cup: 2011

=== Germany ===
- FIFA World Cup: 2007
- UEFA European Championship: 2001, 2005
- Summer Olympic Games Bronze Medal: 2004
- Algarve Cup: 2006
