= Jessica Wich =

German footballer (born 1990)

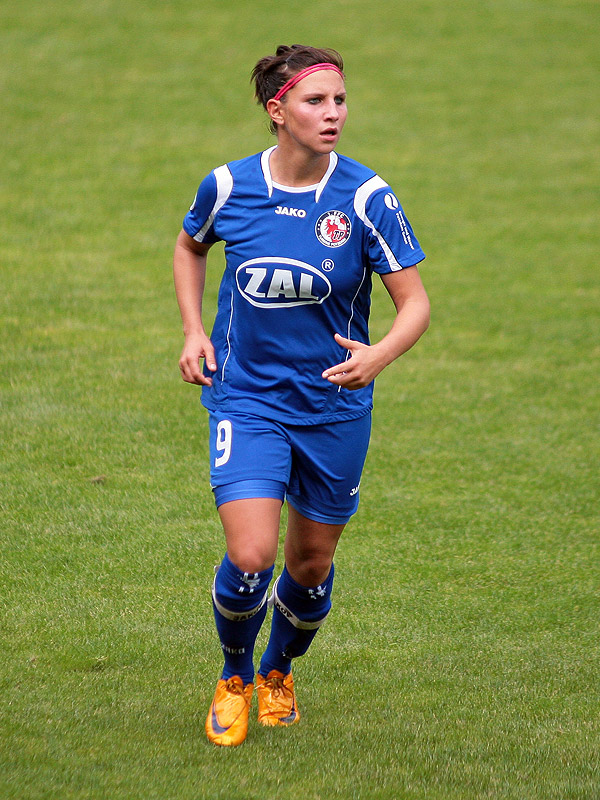
- Wich playing for Potsdam in 2009.

Personal information
- Full name: Jessica Wich
- Date of birth: 14 July 1990 (age 36)
- Place of birth: Kronach, Germany
- Height: 1.63 m (5 ft 4 in)
- Position: Striker

Youth career
- 1996–2002: SV Höfles/Vogtendorf
- 2002–2003: TSF Theisenort
- 2003–2006: SV Reitsch

Senior career*
Years	Team	Apps	(Gls)
2006–2007	SC Regensburg	18	(4)
2007–2011	1.FFC Turbine Potsdam	64	(27)
2011–2012	Hamburger SV	21	(2)
2012–2014	1. FFC Frankfurt	22	(1)
2013–2014	1. FFC Frankfurt II	8	(3)
2014–2022	Bayer Leverkusen	99	(5)

International career^{‡}
2005	Germany U15	3	(3)
2005–2007	Germany U17	19	(7)
2008–2009	Germany U19	11	(3)
2009–2010	Germany U20	9	(0)
2008–2012	Germany U23	4	(1)
- * Club domestic league appearances and goals as of 20 November 2018 ‡ National team caps and goals as of 4 July 2012

Jessica Wich (born 14 July 1990 in Kronach) is a German football striker.

== Career ==
=== Clubs ===
Jessica Wich began her career at the age of 6 years at SV Höfles/Vogtendorf. She then moved to TSF Theisenort followed by SV Reitsch. In 2006 Wich moved to SC Regensburg which just won promotion for the second division. She scored four goals in her first season. Just one year later at the age of 17 she moved to Potsdam and played for one of the best female German soccer clubs 1. FFC Turbine Potsdam. On 26 August 2007 she scored her first Bundesliga goal against SG Wattenscheid 09. In January 2008, she won her first national title with the DFB-Hallenpokal. In her first Bundesliga season, she was the most successful scorer of her team with 13 goals. A year later she won with Potsdam the DFB-Hallenpokal again and got her first German championship title. She was also part of the squad, who one the UEFA Champions League in 2010. Throughout her four seasons at Potsdam she scored 35 goals in 82 appearances in the Bundesliga, the Bundesliga Cup and Champions League. In June 2011 she announced her transfer to Hamburg. After the season 2011/12 Wich joined the club 1. FFC Frankfurt signing a three-year contract. In this period she had 22 appearances and won the DFB-Pokal. On 20 May 2014, Bayer 04 Leverkusen announced Wich's commitment to the season 2014/15. Wich played for Leverkusen for several seasons, staying after the club's relegation.

=== International ===
She made her debut with the Germany women's under-15 national football team on 29 August 2005 and scored three goals against Scotland. With the U17 team, she finished third in the Nordic Cup in 2006 and 2007. In 2008, she reached the semi-finals at the 2008 U19 European Championship in France with the U19 national team and won the FIFA U20 World Cup of 2010 at home in Germany.

== Honours ==
Clubs

- UEFA Women's Champions League Winner 2010 (1. FFC Turbine Potsdam)
- German Champion 2009, 2010, 2011 (1. FFC Turbine Potsdam)
- DFB-Pokal Winner 2014 (1. FFC Frankfurt)
- DFB-Hallenpokal Winner 2008, 2009, 2010 (1. FFC Turbine Potsdam), 2015 (Bayer 04 Leverkusen)

International

- Semi-finalist at 2008 UEFA Women's U19 Championship
- 2010 FIFA U20 World Cup winner
