= Bianca Schmidt =

German footballer (born 1990)

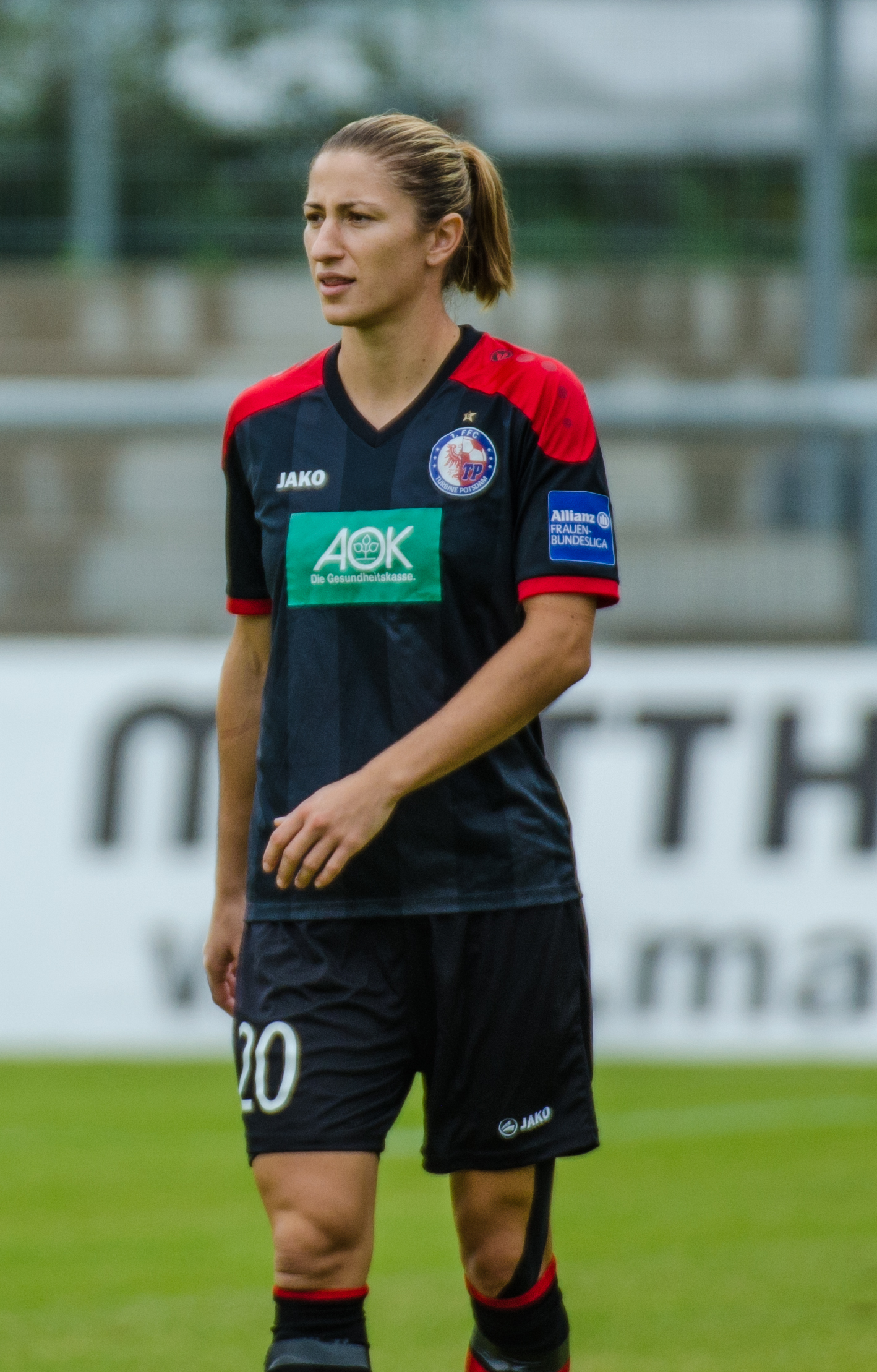
- Schmidt playing for Potsdam in 2015

Personal information
- Full name: Bianca Ursula Schmidt
- Date of birth: 23 January 1990 (age 36)
- Place of birth: Gera, East Germany
- Height: 1.74 m (5 ft 9 in)
- Positions: Wing back; winger

Team information
- Current team: Turbine Potsdam
- Number: 20

Youth career
- 1997–2003: TSV 1880 Gera-Zwötzen
- 2003–2006: 1. FC Gera 03

Senior career*
Years	Team	Apps	(Gls)
2006–2012	Turbine Potsdam	127	(18)
2012–2015	1. FFC Frankfurt	50	(2)
2015–2021	Turbine Potsdam	54	(2)
2021–2023	FC Rosengård	15	(0)
2023–	Turbine Potsdam	7	(0)

International career^{‡}
2005	Germany U15	4	(0)
2006	Germany U17	11	(5)
2007	Germany U19	10	(2)
2007–2010	Germany U20	17	(3)
2009–2015	Germany	51	(3)
Medal record
Women's football
Representing Germany
UEFA Women's Championship
Gold medal – first place	2009 Finland	Team
Gold medal – first place	2013 Sweden	Team
- * Club domestic league appearances and goals as of 15:15, 22 April 2019 (UTC) ‡ National team caps and goals as of 18:17, 23 September 2015 (UTC)

Bianca Ursula Schmidt (born 23 January 1990) is a German footballer. She plays as a defender for Turbine Potsdam and the German national team.

== Career ==
Bianca Schmidt has combined her football career with her duties as a soldier in the Sports Promotion Group of the German Army.

=== Club ===
Schmidt began her career at the age of seven with TSV 1880 Gera-Zwötzen. The club changed its name to 1. FC Gera 03 after a merger in 2003. During her entire youth career up to Under-15 level in the 2005–06 season, she played as the only girl on the team and only knew women's football from state selection squads and junior national teams.

In 2006, Schmidt moved to the reigning German club champions 1. FFC Turbine Potsdam while she attended the Friedrich Ludwig Jahn Potsdam Sport School, which has an elite programme for girls' football. The school has very close links with the FFC Turbine Potsdam club. Schmidt soon became a regular starter for the team. She scored eight goals in her first Bundesliga season and won the Fritz Walter bronze medal as the third best female junior player of the year. At Potsdam, Schmidt won four Bundesliga titles in a row from 2009 to 2012. She also claimed the UEFA Women's Champions League in the 2009–10 season with the team, where she scored during the penalty shoot-out in the final. One year later, Potsdam again made it to the final, but lost against Olympique Lyonnais.

In summer 2012, Schmidt was transferred to 1. FFC Frankfurt. In summer 2015, she rejoined 1. FFC Turbine Potsdam.

In July 2021, Schmidt joined FC Rosengård with a two-year contract until the summer 2023.

=== International ===
Starting at Under-15 level, Schmidt played for several German junior national teams. She won the 2007 UEFA Women's Under-19 Championship and claimed third-place at the 2008 FIFA U-20 Women's World Cup. She made her debut for Germany's senior national team in February 2009 against China. Later that year Schmidt was called up and was a regular starter for Germany at the 2009 European Championship, which the team won. In 2010, she returned to play in a junior competition, winning the 2010 FIFA U-20 Women's World Cup on home soil in Germany. Schmidt was called up for Germany's 2011 FIFA Women's World Cup squad.

==== International goals ====
Scores and results list Germany's goal tally first:

Schmidt – goals for Germany
#	Date	Location	Opponent	Score	Result	Competition
1.	15 September 2012	Karaganda, Kazakhstan	Kazakhstan	5–0	7–0	UEFA Women's Euro 2013 qualifying
2.	13 February 2013	Strasbourg, France	France	1–0	3–3	Friendly
3.	21 September 2013	Cottbus, Germany	Russia	9–0	9–0	2015 FIFA Women's World Cup qualification

== Honours ==
Turbine Potsdam

- UEFA Women's Champions League: 2009–10
- Bundesliga: 2008–09, 2009–10, 2010–11, 2011–12
- DFB-Hallenpokal for women: 2008, 2009

1. FFC Frankfurt

- DFB-Pokal: 2014
- UEFA Women's Champions League: 2014–15

Germany U19

- UEFA U-19 Women's Championship: 2007

Germany U20

- FIFA U-20 Women's World Cup: 2010; Third-place (1) 2008

Germany

- UEFA European Championship: 2009, 2013
- Algarve Cup: 2012, 2014

Individual

- Fritz Walter Medal – Bronze: 2007
