= Navina Omilade =

German footballer (born 1981)

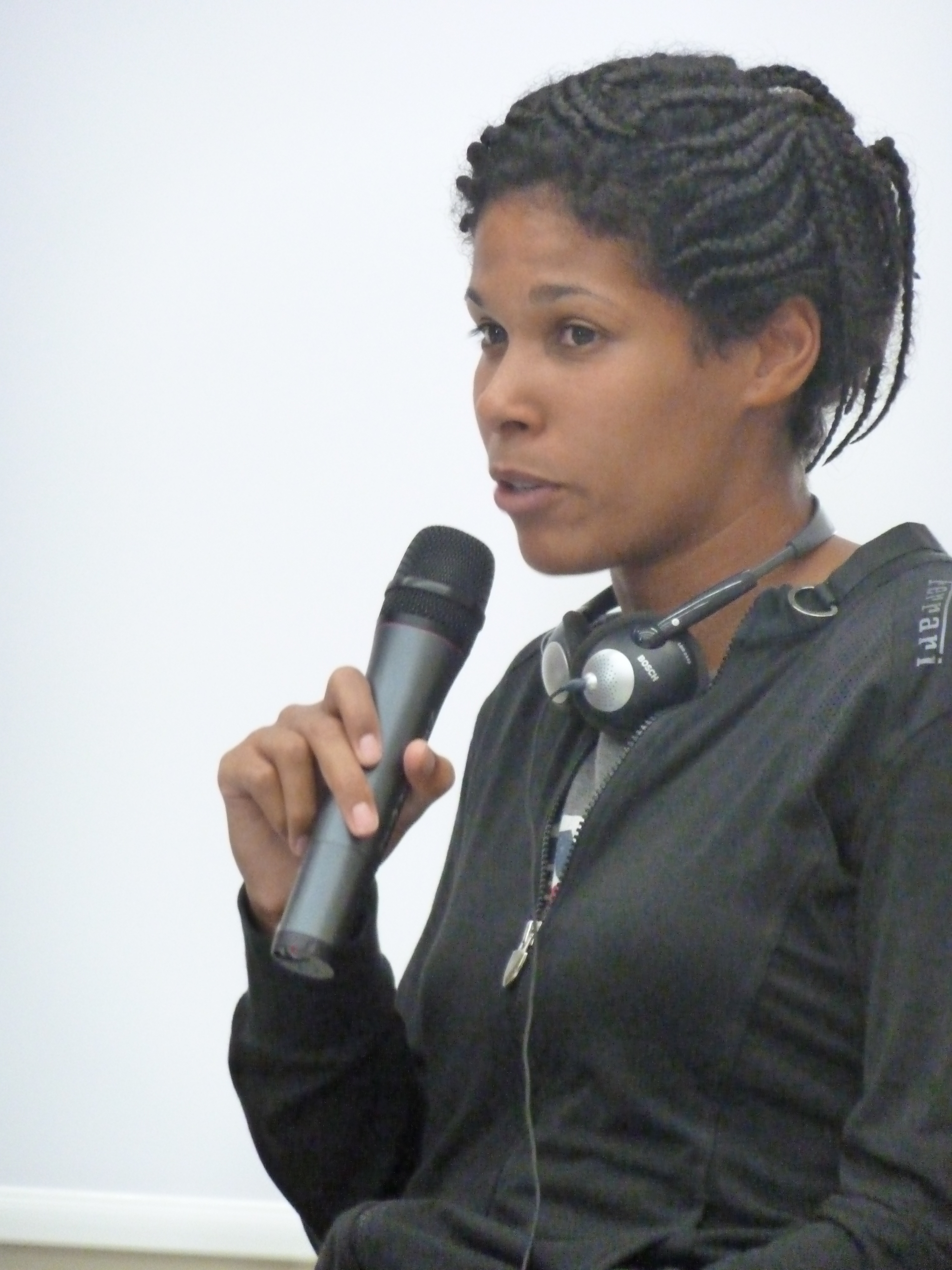

Personal information
- Full name: Navina Omilade
- Date of birth: 3 November 1981 (age 44)
- Place of birth: Mönchengladbach, West Germany
- Position: Midfielder

Youth career
- 1987–1994: Rot-Weiß Hockstein
- 1994–1996: FSC Mönchengladbach

Senior career*
Years	Team	Apps	(Gls)
1996–2000	Grün-Weiß Brauweiler		
2000–2002	FFC Brauweiler Pulheim		
2002–2007	1.FFC Turbine Potsdam		
2007–2013	VfL Wolfsburg		

International career^{‡}
2001–2013	Germany	61	(0)
Medal record
Women's Football
Bronze medal – third place	2004 Athens	Team competition
- * Club domestic league appearances and goals ‡ National team caps and goals as of 19 May 2013

Navina Omilade (born 3 November 1981) is a retired German football midfielder of Nigerian descent. She has also been capped for the German national team.

She ended her career in 2013.

== Honours ==
=== Germany ===
- UEFA Women's Championship: Winner 2005
