= Isabel Kerschowski =

German footballer (born 1988)

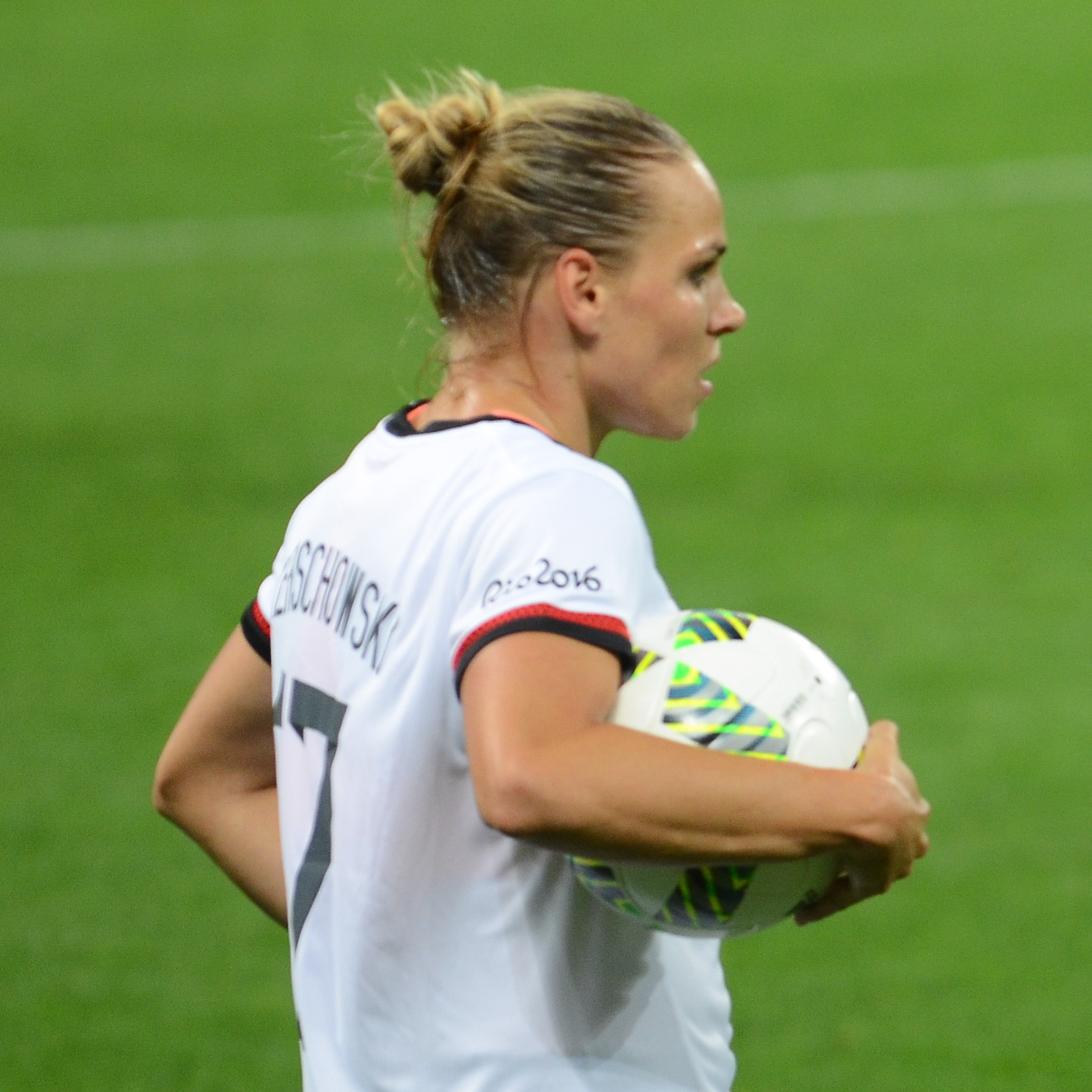
- Kerschowski with Germany in 2016

Personal information
- Full name: Isabel Kerschowski
- Date of birth: 22 January 1988 (age 38)
- Place of birth: Berlin, Germany
- Height: 1.67 m (5 ft 6 in)
- Positions: Striker; defender

Youth career
- 2000–2005: BSC Marzahn

Senior career*
Years	Team	Apps	(Gls)
2005–2012	Turbine Potsdam	122	(25)
2010	Turbine Potsdam II	2	(2)
2012–2014	Bayer Leverkusen	33	(2)
2014–2018	VfL Wolfsburg	52	(6)
2018–2021	Bayer 04 Leverkusen	33	(1)
2021–2022	Turbine Potsdam	17	(0)

International career^{‡}
2003	Germany U15	1	(1)
2003–2005	Germany U17	24	(10)
2005–2007	Germany U19	36	(24)
2008	Germany U20	6	(3)
2007–2010	Germany U23	12	(5)
2007–2017	Germany	21	(4)
Medal record
Olympic Games
Gold medal – first place	2016 Rio de Janeiro	Team
- * Club domestic league appearances and goals as of 27 February 2020 (UTC) ‡ National team caps and goals as of 30 July 2017

Isabel Kerschowski (born 22 January 1988) is a German football striker. She played for 1. FFC Turbine Potsdam and for the German national team.

== International career ==
Kerschowski played for Germany at the 2008 FIFA U-20 Women's World Cup.

She was part of the squad for the 2016 Summer Olympics, where Germany won the gold medal.

=== International goals ===
Scores and results list Germany's goal tally first:

Kerschowski – goals for Germany
#	Date	Location	Opponent	Score	Result	Competition
1.	8 April 2016	Recep Tayyip Erdoğan Stadium, Istanbul, Turkey	Turkey	1–0	6–0	UEFA Women's Euro 2017 qualifying
2.	8 April 2016	Recep Tayyip Erdoğan Stadium, Istanbul, Turkey	Turkey	3–0	6–0	UEFA Women's Euro 2017 qualifying
3.	8 April 2016	Recep Tayyip Erdoğan Stadium, Istanbul, Turkey	Turkey	6–0	6–0	UEFA Women's Euro 2017 qualifying
4.	30 July 2017	Sparta Stadion Het Kasteel, Rotterdam, Netherlands	Denmark	1–0	1–2	UEFA Women's Euro 2017

== Personal life ==
In September 2017, she married her girlfriend.

== Honours ==
1. FFC Turbine Potsdam

- UEFA Women's Champions League: Winner 2009–10
- Bundesliga: Winner 2005–06, 2008–09, 2009–10, 2010–11, 2011–12
- DFB-Pokal: Winner 2005–06
- DFB-Hallenpokal for women: 2008, 2009

VfL Wolfsburg

- Bundesliga: Winner 2016–17
- DFB-Pokal: Winner 2014–15, 2015–16, 2016–17

Germany

- Summer Olympic Games: Gold medal, 2016
- UEFA Women's Under-19 Championship: Winner 2006, 2007

Individual

- UEFA Women's Under-19 Championship: Golden Player 2006
