= Inken Becher =

German footballer

Personal information
- Full name: Inken-Isabell Becher
- Date of birth: 2 September 1978 (age 48)
- Place of birth: Berlin, Germany
- Height: 1.67 m (5 ft 5 1/2 in)
- Position: Midfielder

Team information
- Current team: Tennis Borussia Berlin
- Number: 8

Youth career
- Berliner SV 92
- Hertha 03 Zehlendorf
- SC Siemensstadt

Senior career*
Years	Team	Apps	(Gls)
–2003	Tennis Borussia Berlin	3	(1)
2003–2007	1.FFC Turbine Potsdam	59	(1)
2007–2008	Tennis Borussia Berlin		
2011–2016	Tennis Borussia Berlin	15	(2)

International career^{‡}
1997–2005	Germany	13	(0)
- * Club domestic league appearances and goals ‡ National team caps and goals as of 16:38, 30 November 2013 (UTC)

Inken-Isabell Becher (formerly Beeken; born 2 September 1978) is a former German football defender.

== Club career ==
Becher started playing football in 1985 at Berliner SV 1892, then joined Hertha 03 Zehlendorf, SC Siemensstadt and Tennis Borussia Berlin from where she switched to 1. FFC Turbine Potsdam in 2003. With TeBe she had played Bundesliga already but also experienced relegation. With Turbine she became German champion twice, cup winner three times and won the UEFA Women's Cup in 2005. She was suspended for the second leg of the final after receiving a yellow card in the first leg.

In 2007, Becher returned to Tennis Borussia Berlin where she ended her career for health reasons after the 2007–08 season. She then again played for TeBe in the 2011–2012 Regionalliga season, but ended her career in 2016.

== International career ==
On 28 May 1997, Becher made her Germany women's national football team debut against Norway in a 3–0 defeat. She won 13 caps, the last in Germany's 3–1 win over Canada in Vancouver on 1 September 2005.
