= Tabea Kemme =

German footballer (born 1991)

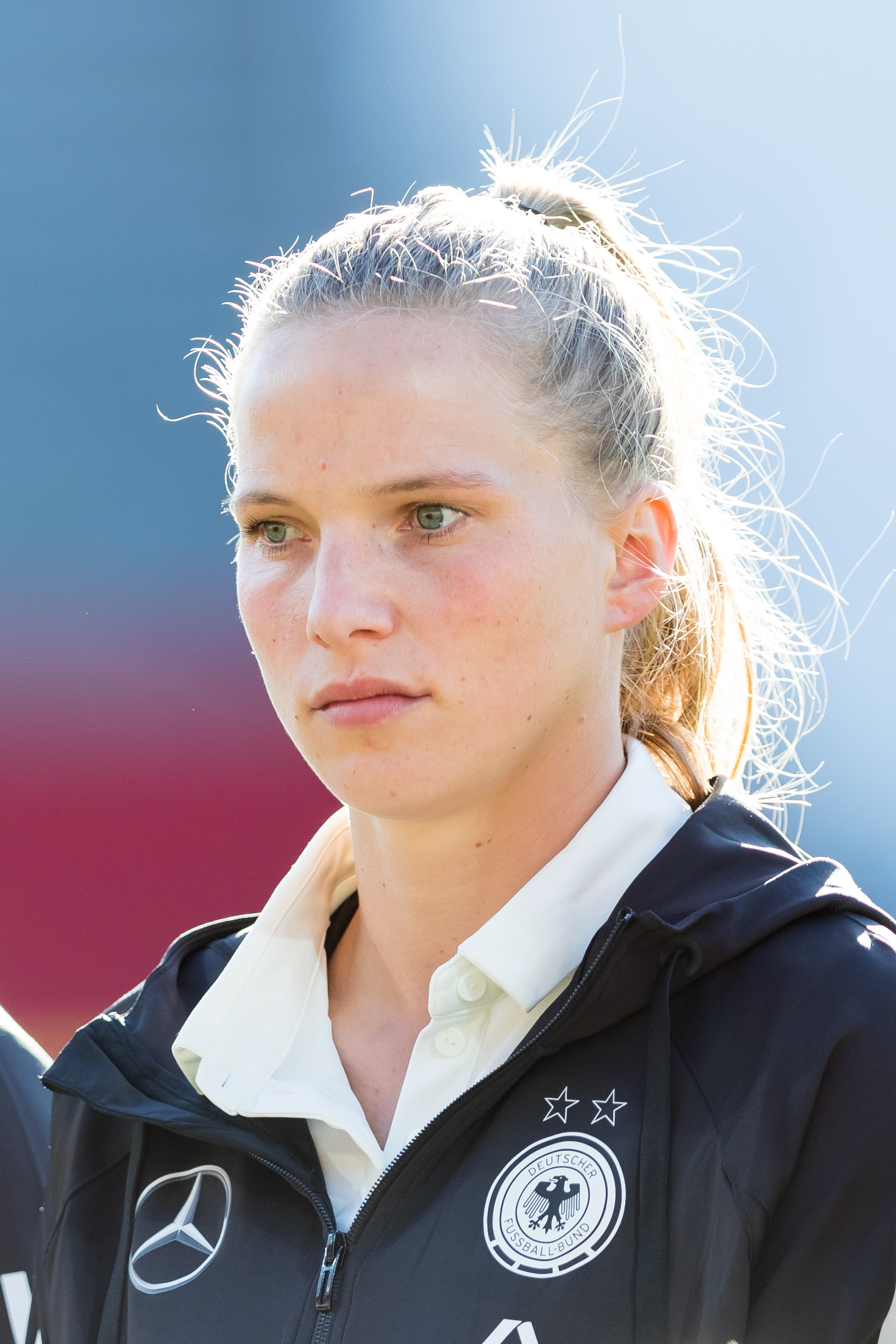
- Kemme in 2017

Personal information
- Full name: Tabea Kemme
- Date of birth: 14 December 1991 (age 34)
- Place of birth: Stade, Germany
- Height: 1.70 m (5 ft 7 in)
- Positions: Full-back; winger

Youth career
- 2000–2006: SG Freiburg/Oederquart
- 2006–2008: 1. FFC Turbine Potsdam

Senior career*
Years	Team	Apps	(Gls)
2008–2010	1. FFC Turbine Potsdam II	6	(2)
2008–2018	1. FFC Turbine Potsdam	145	(24)
2018–2020	Arsenal	3	(0)
Total		154	(26)

International career
2007–2008	Germany U17	15	(6)
2009–2010	Germany U19	11	(0)
2010	Germany U20	10	(0)
2013–2018	Germany	47	(6)
Medal record
Olympic Games
Gold medal – first place	2016 Rio de Janeiro	Team
- * Club domestic league appearances and goals

Tabea Kemme (born 14 December 1991) is a German former professional footballer who played as a full-back or winger for Frauen-Bundesliga 1. FFC Turbine Potsdam for twelve years and for Arsenal of the FA Women's Super League.

During her youth career and the first two seasons of her senior career, Kemme played as an attacker. She switched to more defensive playing positions while playing for Germany U20 during the 2010 FIFA U-20 Women's World Cup. Two of Kemme's goals for 1. FFC Turbine Potsdam, both long-range shots, were included in the 10 best goals of the German Football Association's Women's Goal of the Season 2014–2015 shortlist.

Kemme combined her football career with her police studies at Brandenburg's police training college.

== Early life ==
Kemme attended the Friedrich Ludwig Jahn Potsdam Sport School, which has an elite program for girls' football. The school has very close links with the FFC Turbine Potsdam club.

== Club career ==
In 2006, Kemme started training and playing with the junior teams of FFC Turbine, progressing to the senior first team in 2008.

She joined Arsenal in July 2018. After persistent injuries, Kemme announced her retirement from professional football on 14 January 2020.

== International career ==
Kemme's first involvement with the Germany national team was in the squad of players selected for a 2013 UEFA Women's Championship qualifying match against Romania on 22 October 2011, but she did not play in the match. Kemme made her international debut for Germany during their 8–0 win against Croatia on 27 November 2013, a match in Germany's FIFA Women's World Cup 2015 qualification campaign. She came on as a substitute for Leonie Maier, in the 76th minute. Kemme was selected for the German squad for the FIFA Women's World Cup 2015 and played six matches in the tournament.

She was one of Germany's starting full-backs for the 2016 Summer Olympics, starting and playing every minute of all but one match. Germany would go on to win the gold medal.

== Police career ==
In 2012, Kemme began her studies as a police commissioner at the University of Applied Sciences of the Brandenburg Police, which she successfully completed in September 2017. Kemme completed the practical part in Oranienburg. The theory part took place in Potsdam and Oberhavel.

== Career statistics ==
Scores and results list Germany's goal tally first:

Kemme – goals for Germany
#	Date	Location	Opponent	Score	Result	Competition
1.	18 September 2015	Halle, Germany	Hungary	3–0	12–0	UEFA Women's Euro 2017 qualifying
2.	25 October 2016	Aalen, Germany	Netherlands	4–1	4–2	Friendly
3.	16 September 2017	Ingolstadt, Germany	Slovenia	4–0	6–0	2019 FIFA Women's World Cup qualifying
4.	16 September 2017	Ingolstadt, Germany	Slovenia	5–0	6–0	2019 FIFA Women's World Cup qualifying
5.	24 October 2017	Großaspach, Germany	Faroe Islands	2–0	11–0	2019 FIFA Women's World Cup qualifying
6.	24 October 2017	Großaspach, Germany	Faroe Islands	3–0	11–0	2019 FIFA Women's World Cup qualifying

== Honours ==
1. FFC Turbine Potsdam

- UEFA Women's Champions League: 2009–10
- Frauen-Bundesliga: 2008–09, 2009–10, 2010–11, 2011–12
- DFB-Hallenpokal: 2009, 2010, 2013, 2014
- DFB Women's Under-17 Championship: 2007–08

Arsenal

- FA Women's Super League: 2018–19

Germany

- FIFA U-20 Women's World Cup: 2010
- UEFA Women's U-17 Championship: 2008
- Algarve Cup: 2014
- Summer Olympic Games: 2016
