= Bernd Schröder =

German football manager

- Schröder in 2015

Personal information
- Date of birth: 22 July 1942 (age 84)
- Place of birth: Lübeck, Germany
- Height: 1.95 m (6 ft 5 in)

Managerial career
- Years: Team
- 1976–1977: 1. FFC Turbine Potsdam

Bernd Schröder (born 22 July 1942) is a German former football manager. He was the manager of women's Bundesliga side 1. FFC Turbine Potsdam from 1971 to 2016.

== Career ==
Schröder was a goalkeeper and played for various clubs in Leipzig. In 1971, he became the first manager of the women's team of the BSG Turbine Potsdam. He led the team for six GDR championships. In 1990, he was the manager of the GDR women's national team that played only one match. After the 1991–92 season, Schröder resigned as manager and became the club's president. He returned to Turbine's bench in late 1997. He won the UEFA Women's Cup in 2005, the German championship in 2004, 2006, 2009, 2010, 2011 and 2012 and the German cup in 2004, 2005 and 2006.
