= Viola Odebrecht =

German footballer (born 1983)

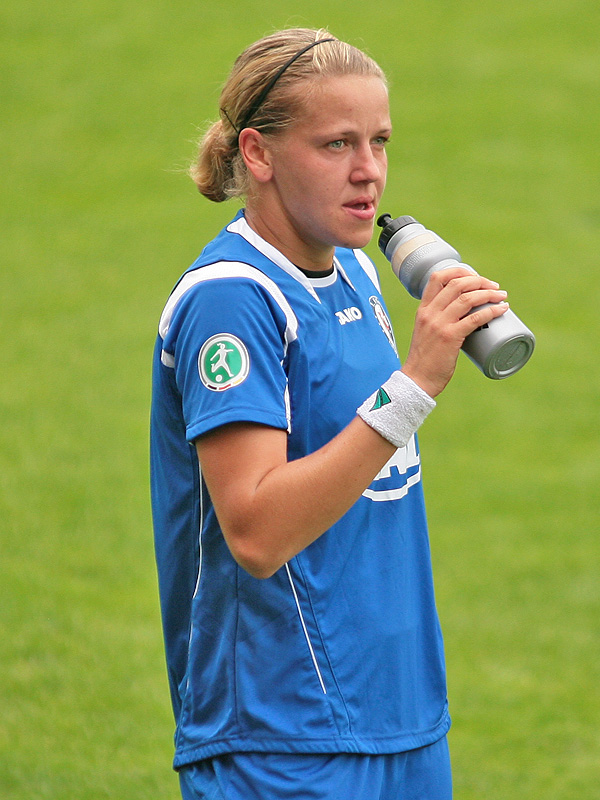
- Odebrecht in 2008

Personal information
- Full name: Viola Odebrecht
- Date of birth: 11 February 1983 (age 43)
- Place of birth: Neubrandenburg, East Germany
- Height: 1.75 m (5 ft 9 in)
- Position: Midfielder

Team information
- Current team: 1. FFC Turbine Potsdam
- Number: 16

Youth career
- 1995–1998: PSV Neubrandenburg

College career
Years	Team	Apps	(Gls)
2005	Florida State Seminoles	24	(9)

Senior career*
Years	Team	Apps	(Gls)
1998–2005	1. FFC Turbine Potsdam		
2006	Valur	5	(1)
2006–2007	FCR 2001 Duisburg	10	(1)
2007–2008	SC 07 Bad Neuenahr	21	(3)
2008–2012	1. FFC Turbine Potsdam	80	(13)
2012–2015	VfL Wolfsburg		

International career^{‡}
2002	Germany U-19		
2003–2015	Germany	49	(2)
Medal record
Women's Football
Bronze medal – third place	2004 Athens	Team competition
- * Club domestic league appearances and goals as of 14:09, 8 May 2012 (UTC) ‡ National team caps and goals as of 20:13, 13 March 2013 (UTC)

Viola Odebrecht (born 11 February 1983) is a retired German footballer who last played for VfL Wolfsburg. She also played for Germany. She played 49 international matches for the national team and became world champion in 2003.

== Club career ==
=== 1. FFC Turbine Potsdam ===
In 2005 Odebrecht won the UEFA Women's Cup with 1.FFC Turbine Potsdam, the team for which she signed again for the 2008/09 season.

In the 2006 summer season, Odebrecht played five times for Valur in the Icelandic Úrvalsdeild, scoring once.

=== VfL Wolfsburg ===
On 29 February 2012, Odebrecht signed a two-year contract and will move to VfL Wolfsburg on 1 July 2012.

She retired after the 2014–15 season.

== International career ==
In 2003, she was a member of the World Cup winning team who went on to take the bronze medal at the Athens Olympics 2004.

After a six-year hiatus, Odebrecht returned to the Germany national side in a Euro 2013 qualifying match against Romania on 22 October 2011.

=== International goals ===
Scores and results list Germany's goal tally first:

Odebrecht – goals for Germany
#	Date	Location	Opponent	Score	Result	Competition
1.	15 November 2003	Reutlingen, Germany	Portugal	8–0	13–0	UEFA Women's Euro 2005 qualifying
2.	15 September 2012	Karaganda, Kazakhstan	Kazakhstan	2–0	7–0	UEFA Women's Euro 2013 qualifying

== Other work ==
Odebrecht was part of a rotation of studio commentators for ESPN's telecasts of the 2011 FIFA Women's World Cup.
