= Jennifer Zietz =

German footballer (born 1983)

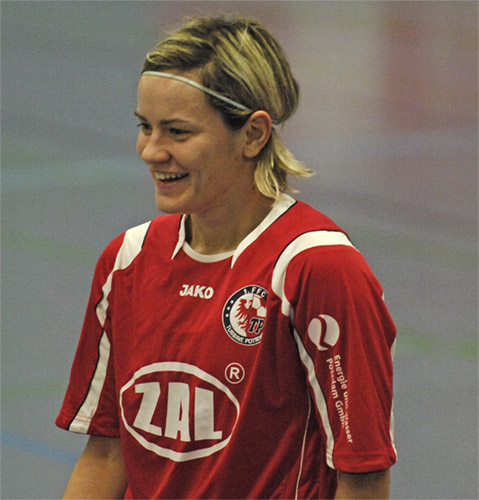
- Zietz in 2009

Personal information
- Date of birth: 14 September 1983 (age 43)
- Place of birth: Rostock, East Germany
- Position: Midfielder

Youth career
- 1989–1991: BSG Post Rostock
- 1991–1993: FC Hansa Rostock
- 1993–1999: PSV Rostock

Senior career*
Years	Team	Apps	(Gls)
1999–2015	1. FFC Turbine Potsdam	276	(90)

International career
2002	Germany U-19		
2005–2010	Germany	15	(1)
Medal record
Women's football
Representing Germany
UEFA Women's Championship
Gold medal – first place	2009 Finland	Team
- * Club domestic league appearances and goals

Jennifer Zietz (born 14 September 1983) is a German retired football player. She has also been capped for the German national team.

Zietz led Turbine Potsdam to a victory over Brøndby in the 2009–10 UEFA Women's Champions League Round of 16.

She retired at the end of the 2014–15 season.

== Honours ==
Turbine Potsdam

- UEFA Women's Cup/UEFA Women's Champions League: 2005, 2010
- Fußball-Bundesliga (women): 2003–04, 2005–06, 2008–09, 2009–10, 2010–11, 2011–12
- DFB Pokal: 2004, 2005, 2006
- DFB-Hallenpokal: 2004, 2005, 2008, 2009, 2010, 2013, 2014

=== Germany ===
- UEFA Women's Championship: Winner 2009

=== Individual ===
- One Club Award: 2022
