= Germany women's national youth football teams =

National youth association football teams

This article includes the German Football Association's (DFB) women's national youth football teams.

== Head coaches ==
As of 1 July 2021.

Team	Head coach
Under-23	Vacant
Under-19/20	(Germany) Kathrin Peter
Under-17	(Germany) Friederike Kromp
Under-16	(Germany) Sabine Loderer
Under-15	(Germany) Bettina Wiegmann

== Records ==
=== FIFA U-20 Women's World Championship ===
- Winner (2010, 2014)
- Runner-Up (2012)
- 3rd Place (2008)

=== FIFA U-19 Women's World Championship ===
- Winner (2004)
- 3rd Place (2002)

=== FIFA U-17 Women's World Championship ===
- 3rd Place (2008)
- 4th Place (2012)

=== UEFA Women's Under-19 Championship ===
- Winner (2000, 2001, 2002, 2006, 2007, 2011)
- Runner-Up (1999, 2004)

=== UEFA Women's Under-17 Championship ===
- Winner (2008, 2009, 2012, 2014, 2016, 2017)
- 3rd Place (2010, 2011)

== See also ==
- Germany women's national football team
- Germany women's national under-20 football team
- FIFA U-20 Women's World Cup
- FIFA U-17 Women's World Cup
- UEFA Women's Under-19 Championship
- UEFA Women's Under-17 Championship
