= 2009 UEFA Women's Cup final =

- Event: 2008–09 UEFA Women's Cup
Zvezda Perm	Duisburg
(Russia)	(Germany)
1	7

First leg
Zvezda Perm	Duisburg
0	6
- Date: 16 May 2009
- Venue: Central Stadium, Kazan
- Referee: Claudine Brohet
- Attendance: 700

Second leg
Duisburg	Zvezda Perm
1	1
- Date: 22 May 2009
- Venue: MSV-Arena, Duisburg
- Referee: Jenny Palmqvist
- Attendance: 28,112

The 2009 UEFA Women's Cup final was played on 16 May and 22 May 2009 between Duisburg of Germany and Zvezda Perm of Russia. Duisburg won 7–1 on aggregate.

The 2nd-leg attendance of 28,112 was claimed by UEFA as a European record for women's club football, ignoring the existence of earlier reported women's club match attendances of 53,000.

== Match details ==
=== First leg ===
16 May 2009
17:15 (CET)

Zvezda Perm (Russia)	0–6	(Germany) Duisburg
	Report	Maes 42', 82'; Grings 64' (pen.), 84', 90+1'; Bajramaj 70'

Central Stadium, Kazan
Attendance: 700
Referee: Claudine Brohet (Belgium)

Zvezda Perm	Duisburg

ZVEZDA PERM:
GK	12	(Ukraine) Nadiya Baranova
DF	2	(Russia) Elena Suslova
DF	3	(Russia) Ksenia Tsybutovich
DF	21	(Russia) Olga Sergaeva		(substituted off) 69'
DF	22	(Russia) Valentina Savchenkova
MF	33	(Ukraine) Natalia Zinchenko (c)		(substituted off) 87'
MF	17	(Ukraine) Daryna Apanaschenko
MF	20	(Russia) Natalia Barbashina
MF	23	(Ukraine) Vera Djatel	(yellow card) 25'
MF	24	(Ukraine) Alla Lishafai	(yellow card) 11'
FW	7	(Russia) Olesya Kurochkina	(yellow card) 63'	(substituted off) 69'
Substitutes:
GK	73	(Russia) Tatiana Repeikina
DF	5	(Ukraine) Hanna Kostraba
DF	6	(Azerbaijan) Olga Vasil'eva		(substituted on) 87'
DF	13	(Russia) Maria Dyatchkova		(substituted on) 69'
DF	25	(Russia) Olesya Truntaeva
FW	9	(Russia) Anna Korovushkina		(substituted on) 69'
Manager:
(Russia) Aleksandr Grigoryan

DUISBURG:
GK	1	(Germany) Kathrin Längert
DF	13	(Germany) Annike Krahn
DF	15	(Germany) Sonja Fuss
MF	8	(Netherlands) Annemieke Kiesel		(substituted off) 46'
MF	10	(Germany) Linda Bresonik	(yellow card) 58'
MF	11	(Germany) Simone Laudehr		(substituted off) 62'
MF	17	(Germany) Marina Hegering
MF	23	(Germany) Fatmire Bajramaj		(substituted off) 75'
MF	28	(Belgium) Femke Maes
FW	9	(Germany) Inka Grings (c)
FW	25	(Germany) Alexandra Popp
Substitutes:
GK	26	(Switzerland) Kathrin Lehmann
DF	3	(Germany) Anne van Bonn		(substituted on) 46'
DF	5	(Germany) Elena Hauer
MF	6	(Germany) Jennifer Oster		(substituted on) 62'
MF	18	(Germany) Irini Ioannidou
FW	7	(Germany) Turid Knaak		(substituted on) 75'
FW	27	(Germany) Charline Hartmann
Manager:
(Germany) Martina Voss

=== Second leg ===
22 May 2009
19:30 (CET)

Duisburg (Germany)	1–1	(Russia) Zvezda Perm
Krahn 45'	Report	Apanaschenko 25'

MSV-Arena, Duisburg
Attendance: 28,112
Referee: Jenny Palmqvist (Sweden)

Duisburg	Zvezda Perm

DUISBURG:
GK	1	(Germany) Kathrin Längert		(substituted off) 77'
DF	3	(Germany) Anne van Bonn
DF	13	(Germany) Annike Krahn
DF	15	(Germany) Sonja Fuss
MF	8	(Netherlands) Annemieke Kiesel		(substituted off) 50'
MF	11	(Germany) Simone Laudehr		(substituted off) 69'
MF	17	(Germany) Marina Hegering	(yellow card) 41'
MF	23	(Germany) Fatmire Bajramaj
MF	28	(Belgium) Femke Maes
FW	9	(Germany) Inka Grings (c)
FW	25	(Germany) Alexandra Popp
Substitutes:
GK	21	(Germany) Christina Bellinghoven		(substituted on) 77'
DF	4	(Germany) Marith Prießen
DF	5	(Germany) Elena Hauer
DF	19	(Germany) Corina Schröder
MF	6	(Germany) Jennifer Oster		(substituted on) 50'
FW	7	(Germany) Turid Knaak		(substituted on) 69'
FW	16	(Germany) Hasret Kayikci
Manager:
(Germany) Martina Voss

ZVEZDA PERM:
GK	12	(Ukraine) Nadiya Baranova
DF	6	(Azerbaijan) Olga Vasil'eva	(yellow card) 35'	(substituted off) 61'
DF	3	(Russia) Ksenia Tsybutovich
DF	21	(Russia) Olga Sergaeva	(yellow card) 45+1'
DF	22	(Russia) Valentina Savchenkova
MF	33	(Ukraine) Natalia Zinchenko (c)
MF	17	(Ukraine) Daryna Apanaschenko
MF	20	(Russia) Natalia Barbashina
MF	23	(Ukraine) Vera Djatel
MF	24	(Ukraine) Alla Lishafai
FW	9	(Russia) Anna Korovushkina		(substituted off) 82'
Substitutes:
GK	73	(Russia) Tatiana Repeikina
DF	2	(Russia) Elena Suslova		(substituted on) 61'
DF	13	(Russia) Maria Dyachkova		(substituted on) 82'
DF	25	(Russia) Olesya Truntaeva
FW	7	(Russia) Olesya Kurochkina
Manager:
(Russia) Stanislav Kharitonov
