= Annemieke Kiesel =

Dutch footballer and coach (born 1979)

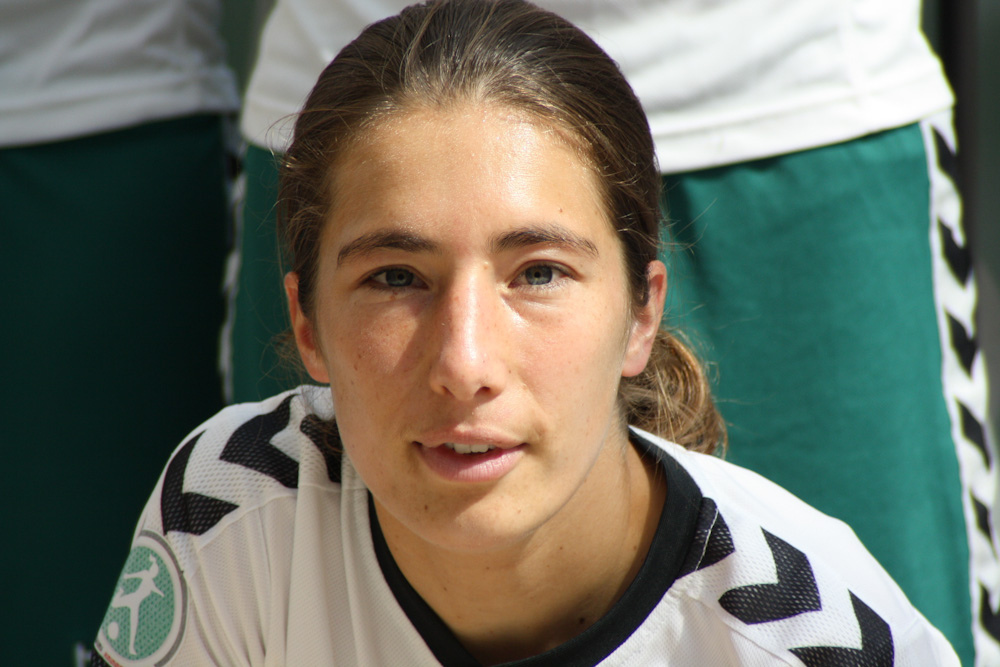

Personal information
- Full name: Annemieke Kiesel-Griffioen
- Date of birth: 30 November 1979 (age 46)
- Place of birth: Kockengen, Netherlands
- Height: 1.67 m (5 ft 6 in)
- Position: Midfielder

Youth career
- 1987–1991: OSV Nita
- 1991–1994: CS Wilnis

Senior career*
Years	Team	Apps	(Gls)
1994–2004	SV Saestum		
2004	Charlotte Lady Eagles	8	(0)
2004–2005	Bristol Academy	16	(3)
2005–2011	FCR 2001 Duisburg	104	(7)

International career
1995–2011	Netherlands	156	(19)
- * Club domestic league appearances and goals

Annemieke Kiesel (née Griffioen; born 30 November 1979) is a Dutch former football player and coach. She played for clubs in the Netherlands, United States, England and Germany, winning titles with Dutch and German clubs. She also played for the Netherlands national team between 1995 and 2011, retiring with 156 caps, making her the player with the second most appearances for the Dutch national team (men and women) of all time. Following her playing career, she took on coaching and has worked either as assistant coach or as head coach.

== Club career ==
Born in Kockengen, she started playing football at the age of 7 for amateur club OSV Nita in Nieuwer Ter Aa, as the club did not have a girls team, she played in the boys youth teams. At the age of 11 she changed club and played in the girls team of CS Wilnis and after a couple of years she was in the club's first women's team. In 1994 she arrived at Hoofdklasse (first division) club SV Saestum, where she played for 10 years, winning the Dutch League six times and the KNVB Cup on three occasions, it was also during her time at the club that she first played in the UEFA Women's Cup, making her debut on 25 September 2002 in the 2002–03 UEFA Women's Cup match against SK Trondheims-Ørn.

In the summer of 2004, she left the Netherlands and went to the United States, where she played 8 matches for Charlotte Lady Eagles in the 2004 USL W-League season.

Later that year (2004) she returned to Europe, joined English FA Women's Premier League club Bristol Academy and played a total of 20 matches (16 league and 4 cup) scoring 5 goals (3 league and 2 cup) during her single season at the club.

In 2005, she joined German Bundesliga club FCR 2001 Duisburg. She did not manage to win the league at the club, was runner-up on four occasions, but won the German Cup twice (2008–09 and 2009–10) and won the UEFA Women's Cup in 2008–09. After the 2010–11 season she announced her retirement from football, having played over 120 official matches in all competitions (104 league matches) for FCR 2001 Duisburg.

== International career ==
Her debut for the Netherlands women's national football team came when she was 16 years old, on 9 December 1995 against France in a 1997 UEFA Women's Euro qualification match. Over the years she was regularly picked in the starting line-up team and featured in many matches, but the team only played minor tournaments (she won a silver medal in the 2001 Universiade) as it did not manage to qualify for major tournaments.

At UEFA Women's Euro 2009, the first major tournament the women's team played, Kiesel-Griffioen played a very good tournament and had an important role in the Dutch midfield. The team beat Ukraine and Denmark (lost to Finland) in the group stage, to then eliminate France (on penalty shoot-out) in the quarter-final and were 3 minutes away from another penalty shoot-out in the semi-final but fell to England's winning goal. The semifinal match was Kiesel-Griffioen 141st match for the Dutch team (equalling Marleen Wissink record).

On 24 October 2009, she broke the record against Norway earning her 142nd cap.

Her last match for the national team, on 18 May 2011 against North Korea, was her 156th cap making her the player with the most appearances for the Dutch national team (men and women) of all time.

== Coaching career ==
Since retiring as a player, she took on coaching women's teams and was first appointed as an assistant coach at Dutch club VVV-Venlo in 2011. She returned to Duisburg to work between 2012 and 2014 as assistant coach and head coach at the youth teams of FCR 2001 Duisburg and subsequently MSV Duisburg (which absorbed FRC 2001 Duisburg in 2014). She gave up on coaching and has worked as a scout for the Royal Dutch Football Association (KNVB), she watched opponents and informed the KNVB staff about them in the 2013 UEFA Women's Euro and 2015 FIFA Women's World Cup.

== Career statistics ==
Scores and results list the Netherlands' goal tally first, score column indicates score after each Kiesel goal.

List of international goals scored by Annemieke Kiesel
No.	Date	Venue	Opponent	Score	Result	Competition
1	6 March 1996	Sportpark Budel, Budel, Netherlands	Belgium	3–0	4–0	Friendly
2	8 September 1996	Stadion SK Union Vršovice, Prague, Czech Republic	Czech Republic	1–1	2–1	1997 UEFA Women's Euro qualification
3	14 August 1997	Sportpark De Kloet, Grootebroek, Netherlands	Australia	1–0	1–1	Friendly
4	16 September 1997	KNVB Academy, Zeist, Netherlands	Belgium	1–0	3–0	Friendly
5	1 April 2000	Polman Stadion, Almelo, Netherlands	Spain	1–1	1–2	2001 UEFA Women's Euro qualification
6	18 September 2000	Sportpark Panhuis, Veenendaal, Netherlands	Scotland	2–1	3–1	Friendly
7	14 October 2000	Sportcentrum Bük, Bük, Hungary	Hungary	3–0	3–0	2001 UEFA Women's Euro qualification
8	6 March 2001	Sportpark De Hoge Neerstraat, Etten-Leur, Netherlands	Belgium	3–1	5–1	Friendly
9	8 May 2001	West Lothian Courier Stadium, Livingston, Scotland	Scotland	1–0	4–0	Friendly
10	23 March 2002	Zuiderpark Stadion, The Hague, Netherlands	England	1–2	1–4	2003 FIFA Women's World Cup qualification
11	27 November 2002	Sportpark Rijsoord, Ridderkerk, Netherlands	Belgium	2–0	4–0	Friendly
12	27 November 2002	Sportpark Rijsoord, Ridderkerk, Netherlands	Belgium	3–0	4–0	Friendly
13	11 July 2009	Olympic Stadium, Amsterdam, Netherlands	Switzerland	3–0	5–0	Friendly
14	29 October 2009	Oosterenkstadion, Zwolle, Netherlands	North Macedonia	1–0	13–1	2011 FIFA Women's World Cup qualification
15	29 October 2009	Oosterenkstadion, Zwolle, Netherlands	North Macedonia	4–0	13–1	2011 FIFA Women's World Cup qualification
16	29 October 2009	Oosterenkstadion, Zwolle, Netherlands	North Macedonia	9–0	13–1	2011 FIFA Women's World Cup qualification
17	29 October 2009	Oosterenkstadion, Zwolle, Netherlands	North Macedonia	10–1	13–1	2011 FIFA Women's World Cup qualification
18	1 April 2010	NTC Stadion, Senec, Slovakia	Slovakia	1–0	1–0	2011 FIFA Women's World Cup qualification
19	3 April 2011	Kras Stadion, Volendam, Netherlands	Scotland	5–1	6–2	Friendly

== Honours ==
SV Saestum

- Hoofdklasse (6): 1995–96, 1996–97, 1997–98, 1998–99, 1999–2000, 2001–02
- KNVB Cup: 1997–98, 1998–99, 2003–04

FCR 2001 Duisburg

- Frauen-Bundesliga runner-up: 2005–06, 2006–07, 2007–08, 2009–10
- German Cup: 2008–09, 2009–10; runner-up 2006–07
- UEFA Women's Cup: 2008–09

Individual

- Best player Hoofdklasse: 2002–03
