= Jennifer Oster =

German footballer

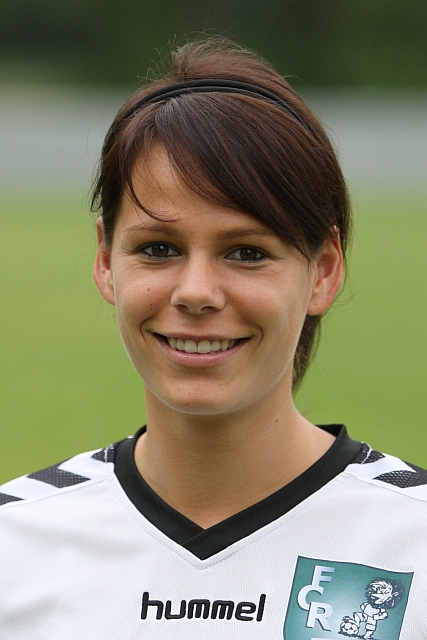

Personal information
- Date of birth: 2 March 1986 (age 40)
- Place of birth: Moers, West Germany
- Height: 1.63 m (5 ft 4 in)
- Position: Midfielder

Youth career
- –1999: VfL Tönisberg
- 1999–2003: FCR 2001 Duisburg

Senior career*
Years	Team	Apps	(Gls)
2003–2013	FCR 2001 Duisburg	191	(45)
2014–2015	MSV Duisburg	31	(3)
Total		222	(48)

International career
2006	Germany U20	2	(1)
2006	Germany U21	4	(0)
- * Club domestic league appearances and goals

Jennifer Oster (born 2 March 1986) is a retired German footballer.

== Honours ==
=== FCR 2001 Duisburg ===
- Bundesliga: Runner-up 2004–05, 2005–06, 2006–07, 2007–08, 2009–10
- German Cup: Winner 2008–09, 2009–10, Runner-up 2006–07
- UEFA Women's Cup: Winner 2008–09
