= Fatmire Alushi =

German footballer (born 1988)

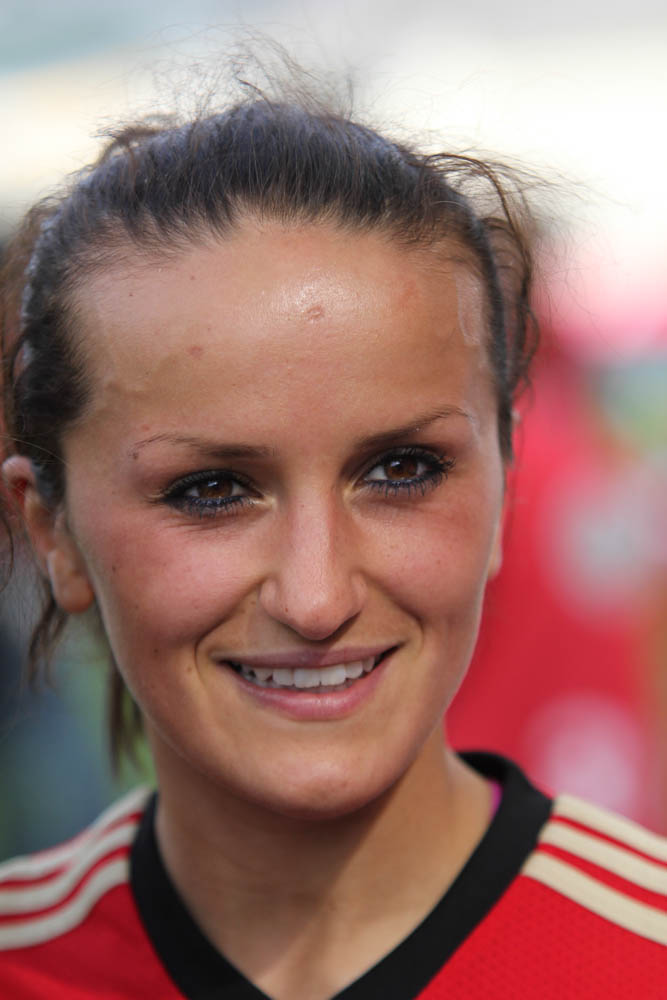
- Alushi in 2013

Personal information
- Full name: Fatmire Alushi
- Birth name: Fatmire Bajramaj
- Date of birth: 1 April 1988 (age 38)
- Place of birth: Gjurakoc, Kosovo, SFR Yugoslavia
- Height: 1.70 m (5 ft 7 in)
- Position: Midfielder

Youth career
- 1993–1998: DJK/VfL Giesenkirchen
- 1998–2004: FSC Mönchengladbach

Senior career*
Years	Team	Apps	(Gls)
2004–2009	FCR 2001 Duisburg	84	(30)
2009–2011	1. FFC Turbine Potsdam	40	(29)
2011–2014	1. FFC Frankfurt	27	(10)
2014–2016	Paris Saint-Germain	24	(8)
Total		175	(77)

International career
2003	Germany U15	2	(0)
2004	Germany U17	7	(0)
2005–2006	Germany U19	16	(1)
2005–2015	Germany	79	(18)
Medal record
Women's football
Representing Germany
FIFA Women's World Cup
Gold medal – first place	2007 China	Team
Olympic Games
Bronze medal – third place	2008 Beijing	Team
UEFA Women's Championship
Gold medal – first place	2009 Finland	Team
Gold medal – first place	2013 Sweden	Team
- * Club domestic league appearances and goals

Fatmire "Lira" Alushi (née Bajramaj; born 1 April 1988) is a German former professional footballer who played as an attacking midfielder for the Germany women's national team. She placed third in 2010 FIFA Ballon d'Or competition, an annual award given to the world's best player.

== Club career ==
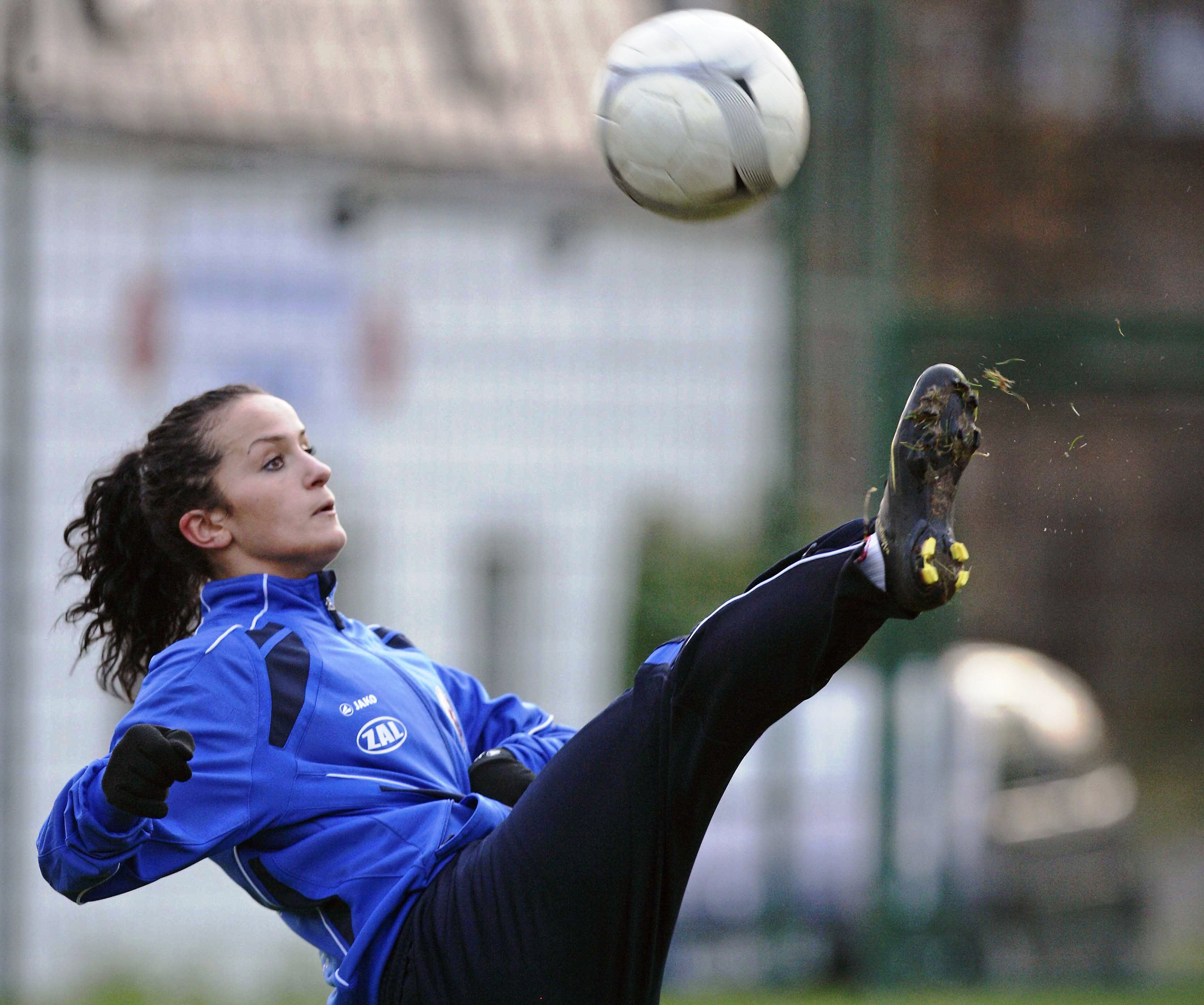
Alushi at practice with Potsdam in 2009

Alushi began her career at DJK/VfL Giesenkirchen. From 1997 to 2004, she played for FSC Mönchengladbach, before moving to the Bundesliga side and joining FCR 2001 Duisburg. She made her Bundesliga debut in September 2004 for the club and scored her first goal one month later. Alushi immediately became a regular starter for Duisburg. She was runner-up with Duisburg for four seasons in a row from 2005 to 2008. During the 2008–09 season, Alushi won the UEFA Women's Champions League. She also claimed the 2009 German Cup title, where she scored in the final.

After five seasons at Duisburg, Alushi moved to league rivals 1. FFC Turbine Potsdam for the 2009–10 season. At her new club, she won the Bundesliga title in 2010 and 2011. In the 2009–10 season, Potsdam also claimed the inaugural UEFA Women's Champions League title, with Bajramaj scoring during the penalty shoot-out in the final. One year later, Potsdam again made it to the final, but lost against Olympique Lyonnais.

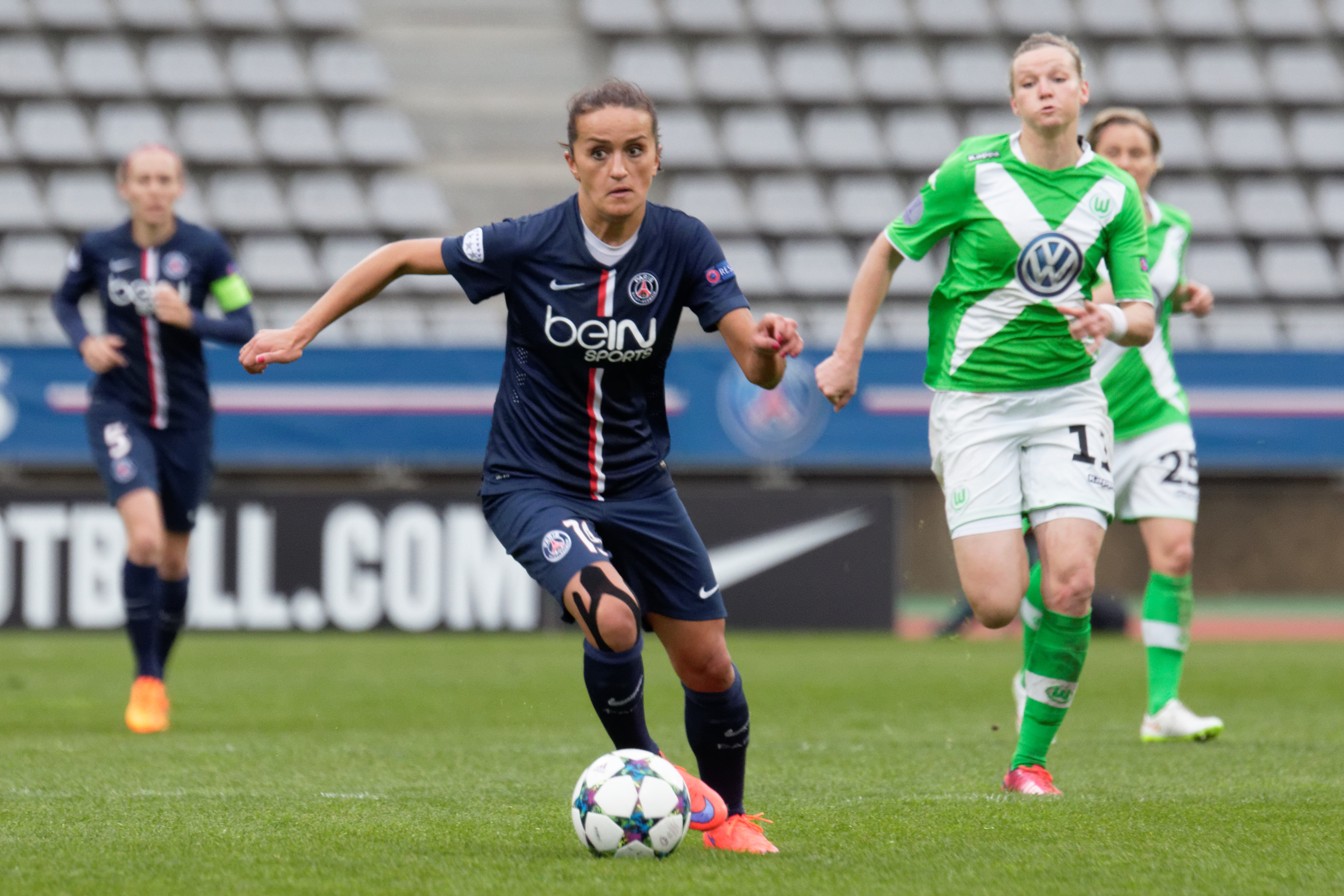
Alushi with PSG during a Champions League semi-final match against Wolfsburg in April 2015

Alushi came in third place for the 2010 FIFA Ballon d'Or award. She announced to move to 1. FFC Frankfurt for the 2011–12 season. The transfer was the most expensive in women's Bundesliga history at the time.

In 2014, she transferred to Paris Saint-Germain Féminines.

Alushi announced her retirement on 28 February 2017.

== International career ==
Alushi made her debut for Germany’s senior national team in October 2005 against Scotland. One year later, she won 2006 UEFA Women's Under-19 Championship at junior level. At the 2006 FIFA U-20 Women's World Championship, the German team was eliminated in the quarter-finals. Alushi started in all four of the team's matches and scored three goals during the tournament.

She won her first major international title at the 2007 FIFA World Cup. She was a reserve player for Germany, appearing in four games, including the tournament's final, in which she won the corner that let to Germany's second goal. One year later, Alushi claimed bronze with Germany at the 2008 Summer Olympics. She was brought on after 62 minutes in the third-place play-off and scored both goals in Germany's 2–0 win over Japan. In 2009, Alushi won her first European trophy at the 2009 European Championship, where Germany claimed its seventh title. She was also called up for Germany's 2011 FIFA World Cup squad.

== Personal life ==
Alushi's parents Ismet and Ganimete, who are Kosovo-Albanians, moved their family from Istok, Kosovo to Germany in 1993. In October 2009, she published her autobiography Mein Tor ins Leben – Vom Flüchtling zur Weltmeisterin (My Gate into Life – From Refugee to World Champion [wordplay: German "Tor" translates to both "goal" and "gate"]).

In June 2011, Alushi began dating fellow footballer Enis Alushi. Both their fathers are working together as police officers in Kosovo. The couple announced their engagement the following year. Shortly after, in September 2012, both suffered ACL injuries in matches within 72 hours of each other. The couple got married in December 2013. Following the 2015 UEFA Women's Champions League Final, Alushi announced that she was pregnant and would be forced to miss the 2015 FIFA World Cup in Canada. She stated that she expected to get back to the pitch eventually but that "there are things in life that are simply more important than football".

== Career statistics ==
Scores and results list Germany's goal tally first, score column indicates score after each Alushi goal.

List of international goals scored by Fatmire Alushi
No.	Date	Venue	Opponent	Score	Result	Competition
1	29 July 2007	Magdeburg, Germany	Denmark	3–0	4–0	Friendly
2	21 August 2008	Beijing, China	Japan	1–0	2–0	2008 Summer Olympics
3	21 August 2008	Beijing, China	Japan	2–0	2–0	2008 Summer Olympics
4	24 August 2009	Tampere, Finland	Norway	2–0	4–0	UEFA Women's Euro 2009
5	24 August 2009	Tampere, Finland	Norway	4–0	4–0	UEFA Women's Euro 2009
6	7 September 2009	Helsinki, Finland	Norway	3–1	3–1	UEFA Women's Euro 2009
7	17 February 2010	Duisburg, Germany	North Korea	1–0	3–0	Friendly
8	15 September 2010	Dresden, Germany	Canada	2–0	5–0	Friendly
9	17 September 2011	Augsburg, Germany	Switzerland	1–0	4–1	UEFA Women's Euro 2013 qualifying
10	17 September 2011	Augsburg, Germany	Switzerland	2–0	4–1	UEFA Women's Euro 2013 qualifying
11	22 October 2011	Bucharest, Romania	Romania	2–0	3–0	UEFA Women's Euro 2013 qualifying
12	19 November 2011	Wiesbaden, Germany	Kazakhstan	11–0	17–0	UEFA Women's Euro 2013 qualifying
13	19 September 2012	Duisburg, Germany	Turkey	8–0	10–0	UEFA Women's Euro 2013 qualifying
14	21 September 2013	Cottbus, Germany	Russia	5–0	9–0	2015 FIFA Women's World Cup qualification
15	26 October 2013	Koper, Slovenia	Slovenia	8–0	13–0	2015 FIFA Women's World Cup qualification
16	8 May 2014	Osnabrück, Germany	Slovakia	1–0	9–1	2015 FIFA Women's World Cup qualification
17	8 May 2014	Osnabrück, Germany	Slovakia	3–0	9–1	2015 FIFA Women's World Cup qualification
18	8 May 2014	Osnabrück, Germany	Slovakia	6–0	9–1	2015 FIFA Women's World Cup qualification

== Honours ==
Germany

- FIFA World Cup: 2007
- UEFA European Championship: 2009
- Olympic bronze medal: 2008

FCR 2001 Duisburg

- UEFA Women's Cup: 2008–09
- Bundesliga: runner-up 2004–05, 2005–06, 2006–07, 2007–08
- DFB-Pokal: 2008–09; runner-up 2006–07

Turbine Potsdam

- UEFA Women's Champions League: 2009–10
- Bundesliga: 2009–10, 2010–11

FFC Frankfurt

- UEFA Women's Champions League: runner-up 2011–12
- DFB-Pokal: 2013–14
- FIFA World Cup: 2007
- UEFA European Championship: 2009, 2013
- Olympic bronze medal: 2008
- UEFA Women's U-19 Championship: 2006
- Algarve Cup: 2014

Individual

- Women's Footballer of the Year: 2011
- Silbernes Lorbeerblatt: 2007
- FIFA Ballon d'Or: third place 2010
