= Christina Bellinghoven =

German football goalkeeper

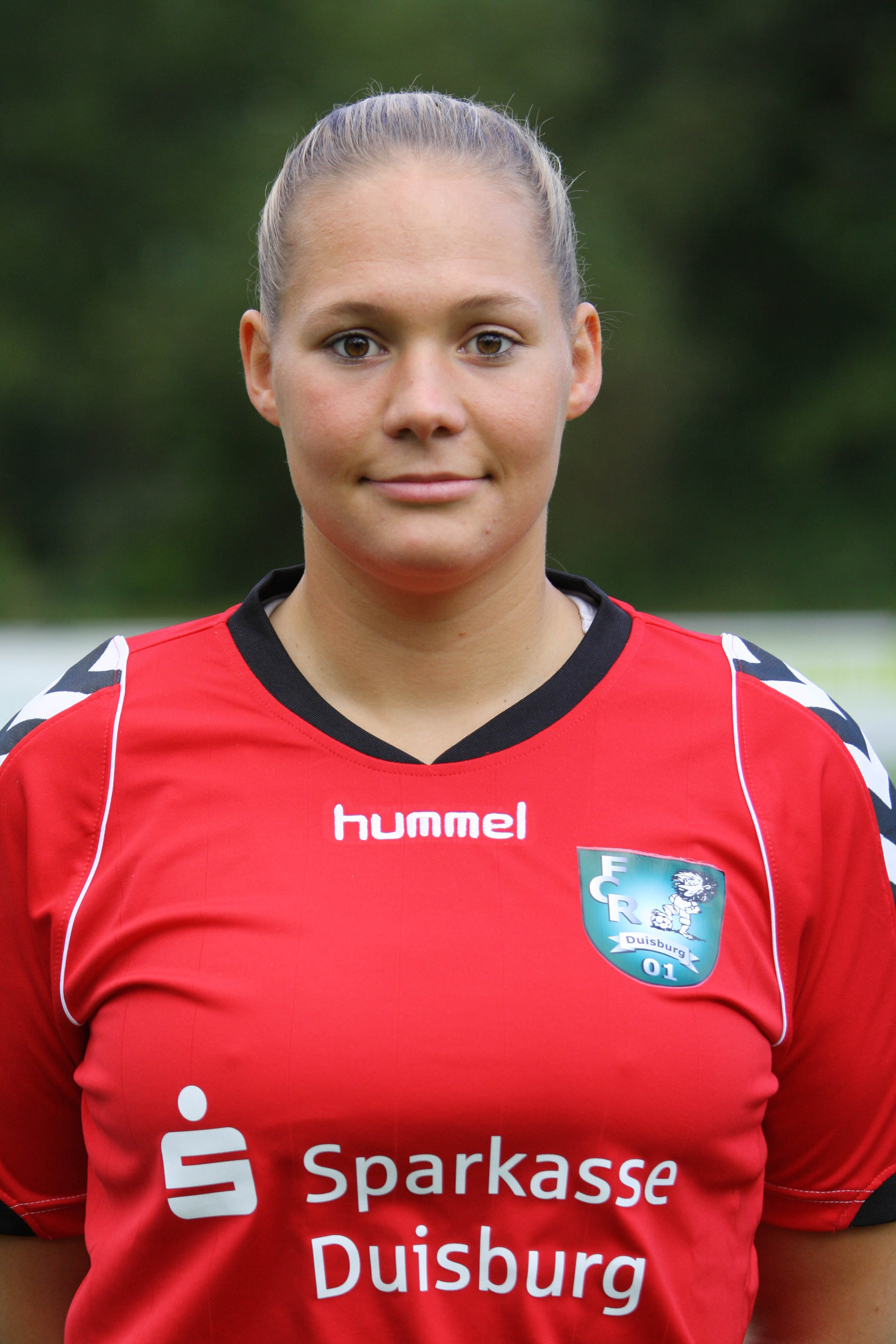
- Bellinghoven in 2011

Personal information
- Full name: Christina Bellinghoven
- Date of birth: 6 August 1988 (age 38)
- Place of birth: Düsseldorf, West Germany
- Height: 1.72 m (5 ft 8 in)
- Position: Goalkeeper

Team information
- Current team: Borussia Mönchengladbach

Youth career
- TuS Viktoria 06 Buchholz
- FCR 2001 Duisburg
- –2006: 1. FFC Turbine Potsdam

Senior career*
Years	Team	Apps	(Gls)
2006–2007	1. FFC Turbine Potsdam	1	(0)
2007–2012	FCR 2001 Duisburg	34	(0)
2013–	FCR 2001 Duisburg		
2016–	Borussia Mönchengladbach		
- * Club domestic league appearances and goals as of 16:32, 10 May 2012 (UTC)

Christina Bellinghoven (born 6 August 1988) is a German football goalkeeper, who plays for Borussia Mönchengladbach.

== Club career ==
=== FCR 2001 Duisburg ===
She spend almost her entire career playing for FCR 2001 Duisburg, either in the Bundesliga (top division) or 2. Bundesliga (second division). On 10 May 2012, Bellinghoven confirmed her retirement from professional football. However, she made a comeback during the following season.

In 2016, she was back in the Bundesliga playing for Borussia Mönchengladbach.

== Honours ==
=== FCR 2001 Duisburg ===
- Bundesliga: Runner-up (2) 2007–08, 2009–10
- German Cup: Winner (2) 2008–09, 2009–10
- UEFA Women's Cup: Winner (1) 2008–09
