= Elena Hauer =

German footballer

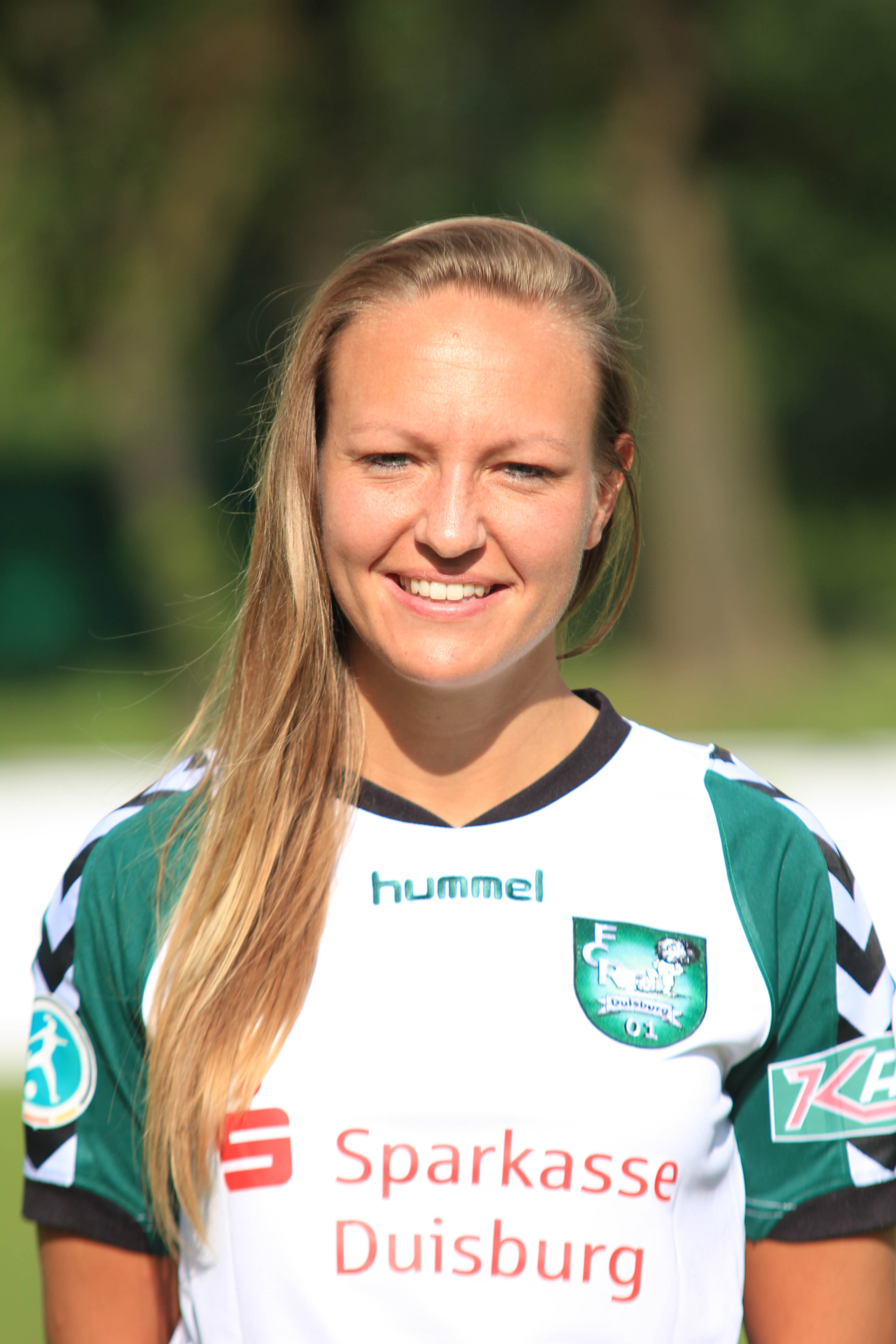

Personal information
- Full name: Elena Stefanie Hauer
- Date of birth: 13 February 1986 (age 40)
- Place of birth: Meerbusch, West Germany
- Height: 1.73 m (5 ft 8 in)
- Positions: Centre back; defensive midfielder

Youth career
- –2001: Linner SV
- 2001–2003: FCR 2001 Duisburg

Senior career*
Years	Team	Apps	(Gls)
2003–2010	FCR 2001 Duisburg	89	(2)
2010–2012	SG Essen-Schönebeck	23	(0)
2012–2013	FCR 2001 Duisburg		
2014–2016	MSV Duisburg		

International career^{‡}
2003	Germany U17	5	(0)
2003–2005	Germany U19	24	(0)
- * Club domestic league appearances and goals as of 30 November 2016 ‡ National team caps and goals as of 22:59, 7 July 2010 (UTC)

Elena Stefanie Hauer (born 13 February 1986) is a German footballer who last played for MSV Duisburg. In her second spell at Duisburg, her time there was blighted by injuries.

== Honours ==
=== FCR 2001 Duisburg ===
- Bundesliga: Runner-up (5) 2004–05, 2005–06, 2006–07, 2007–08, 2009–10
- German Cup: Winner (2) 2008–09, 2009–10, Runner-up (1) 2006–07
- UEFA Women's Cup: Winner (1) 2008–09

=== Germany ===
- FIFA U-19 Women's World Championship: Winner (1) 2004
- UEFA Women's U-19 Championship: Runner-up (1) 2004
