= Corina Schröder =

German footballer (born 1986)

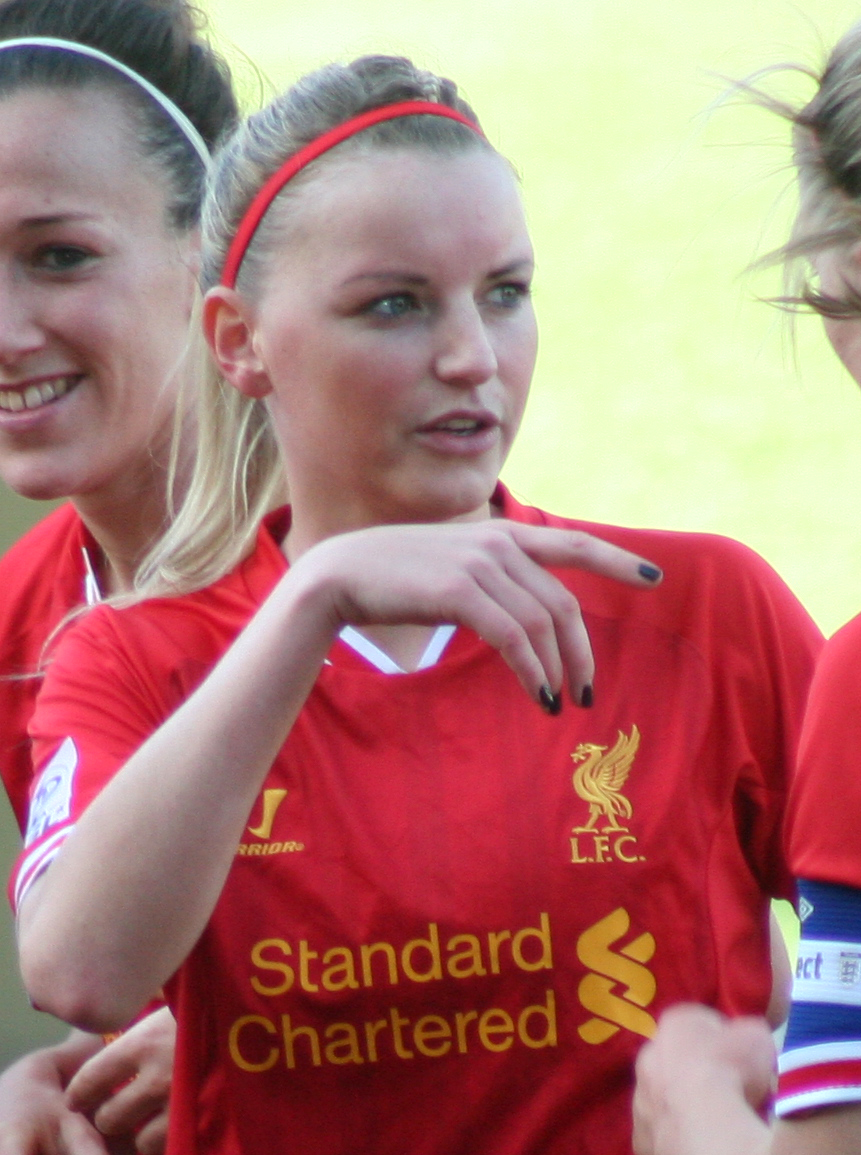
- Corina Schroder with Liverpool Ladies in 2013

Personal information
- Date of birth: 15 August 1986 (age 40)
- Place of birth: Dingden, Germany
- Height: 1.68 m (5 ft 6 in)
- Position: Defender

Senior career*
Years	Team	Apps	(Gls)
2002–2009	FCR 2001 Duisburg	89	(5)
2009–2011	1. FFC Turbine Potsdam	27	(1)
2011–2013	SC 07 Bad Neuenahr	24	(0)
2013–2016	Liverpool Ladies	34	(1)
2016	Birmingham City	2	(0)

International career^{‡}
2006	Germany U-20	1	(0)
2007–2009	Germany U-23	8	(0)
- * Club domestic league appearances and goals as of 11:16, 23 May 2017 (UTC) ‡ National team caps and goals as of 22:34, 9 February 2016 (UTC)

Corina Schröder (born 15 August 1986) is a German footballer who plays as a left-back most recently for Birmingham City in the FA WSL, having previously played for Liverpool Ladies. Before moving to England she played for FCR 2001 Duisburg, 1. FFC Turbine Potsdam and SC 07 Bad Neuenahr in her native Germany. Nicknamed "Coco", she has also been capped for the Germany women's national under-20 football team.

== Club career ==
Schröder started her professional career in the Bundesliga at FCR 2001 Duisburg. She was a runner-up with Duisburg for four seasons in a row from 2005 to 2008. In the 2008–09 season, Schröder won the UEFA Women's Cup. She also claimed the 2009 German Cup title with Duisburg. After seven seasons at Duisburg, Schröder moved to league rivals 1. FFC Turbine Potsdam for the 2009–10 season. At her new club, she won the Bundesliga title in 2010 and 2011. In the 2009–10 season, Potsdam also claimed the inaugural UEFA Women's Champions League title. For the 2011–12 season she moved to SC 07 Bad Neuenahr.

In February 2013, Schröder signed a contract with Liverpool Ladies in the English FA WSL. Under coach Matt Beard Liverpool won the league title in 2013 and 2014 but were much less successful in 2015, finishing second bottom. Schröder and compatriot Nicole Rolser had extended their contracts with the club in November 2014. She missed three months of the 2015 season with a back injury. In February 2016, after 52 matches played and 2 goals scored (in all competitions) and three years in the club, it was announced she was leaving Liverpool Ladies by mutual consent.

On 7 March 2016, Birmingham City confirmed she signed with the club.

== International career ==
As a youth international Schröder represented Germany at the 2006 FIFA U-20 Women's World Championship in Russia.

== Honours ==
FCR 2001 Duisburg

- UEFA Women's Cup: 2009
- Women's DFB Cup: 2009

1. FFC Turbine Potsdam

- UEFA Women's Champions League: 2010
- Women's Bundesliga: 2010, 2011

Liverpool Ladies

- WSL Women's Super League: 2013, 2014
