= Desirée Schumann =

German footballer (born 1990)

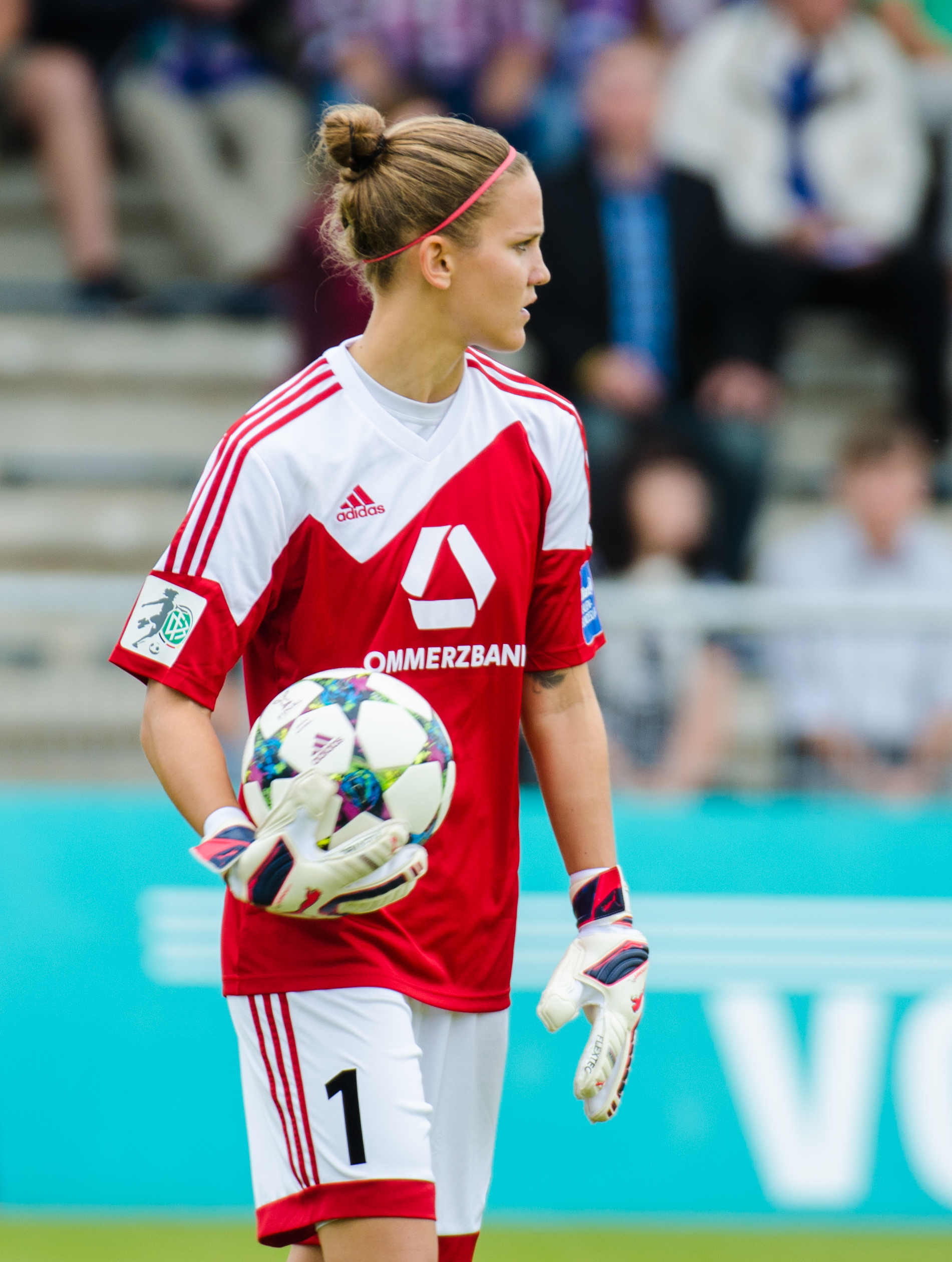

Personal information
- Full name: Desirée Sarah Schumann
- Date of birth: 6 February 1990 (age 36)
- Place of birth: Berlin, West Germany
- Height: 1.77 m (5 ft 10 in)
- Position: Goalkeeper

Youth career
- –2006: VfB Hermsdorf
- 2006–2007: 1. FFC Turbine Potsdam

Senior career*
Years	Team	Apps	(Gls)
2007–2011	1. FFC Turbine Potsdam	39	(0)
2011–2018	FFC Frankfurt	29	(0)

International career^{‡}
	Germany U-17	6	(0)
	Germany U-19	13	(0)
2008–	Germany U-20	7	(0)
	Germany U-23	1	(0)
- * Club domestic league appearances and goals as of 11 May 2014 ‡ National team caps and goals as of 10 September 2014

Desirée Sarah Schumann (born 6 February 1990 in Berlin) is a German retired football goalkeeper.

== Career ==
Her career began at the Berlin-based club VfB Hermsdorf. On April 20, 2006, she made her debut in the German under 17 national team. She then moved to Potsdam for the 2006–07 season and played mostly in the reserve team who plays in the second division. On November 11, 2007, Schumann made her debut in the first team in a Bundesliga match against arch rivals 1. FFC Frankfurt.

In April 2011 she announced her transfer to FFC Frankfurt. For Frankfurt, she played in the 2012 Champions League final, her first Champions League final having sat on the bench as a substitute in 2011 and 2010 while playing for Potsdam.

== Honours ==
1. FFC Turbine Potsdam

- Bundesliga: 2008–09, 2009–10, 2010–11
- DFB-Hallenpokal for women: 2008, 2009, 2010
- UEFA Women's Champions League: 2009–10

1. FFC Frankfurt

- DFB-Pokal: 2013–14
- UEFA Women's Champions League: 2014–15

National team

- FIFA U-20 Women's World Cup: 2010
