= 2008–09 DFB-Pokal Frauen =

Tournament details
- Country: Germany
- Teams: 58

Final positions
- Champions: FCR 2001 Duisburg
- Runners-up: Turbine Potsdam

Tournament statistics
- Matches played: 57
- Goals scored: 288 (5.05 per match)

The DFB-Pokal 2008–09 was the 29th season of the competition. The first round began on 30 August 2008. In the final, held on 30 May 2009 in Berlin FCR 2001 Duisburg defeated Turbine Potsdam 7–0, marking the highest margin by which a Frauen DFB-Pokal final was ever decided.

== 1st round ==
The top six clubs from last year's Bundesliga season were automatically qualified for the second round of the cup. These were 1. FFC Frankfurt, Turbine Potsdam, FCR 2001 Duisburg, Bayern Munich, SC 07 Bad Neuenahr, and VfL Wolfsburg. The other clubs from the Bundesliga all won their first round match.

30 August 2008
| VfR 07 Limburg | 0 – 10 | 1. FC Saarbrücken |
| 1. FC Lübars | 1 – 5 | HSV Borussia Friedenstal |
| SV Bardenbach | 2 – 7 | SC Sand |
31 August 2008
| FFV Neubrandenburg | 1 – 0 | SG Lütgendortmund |
| BV Borussia Bocholt | 0 – 8 | Lokomotive Leipzig |
| SV Johannstadt 90 | 1 – 10 | SG Essen-Schönebeck |
| Hegauer FV | 1 – 3 | SG Wattenscheid 09 |
| 1. FFC 08 Niederkirchen | 4 – 2 | FV Löchgau |
| FFC Brauweiler Pulheim | 1 – 5 | TSV Crailsheim |
| DJK Arminia Ibbenbüren | 3 – 1 | SV Victoria Gersten |
| SC Fortuna Köln | 1 – 2 | FSV Jägersburg |
| TSV Nahe | 0 – 7 | Hamburger SV |
| Magdeburger FFC | 2 – 1 | Holstein Kiel |
| Niendorfer TSV | 0 – 8 | FC Gütersloh 2000 |
| FSV 02 Schwerin | 2 – 5 | Mellendorfer TV |
| FFC Heike Rheine | 2 – 3 | FFC Oldesloe |
| SV Werder Bremen | 2 – 1 | SV Blau-Weiß Hohen Neuendorf |
| VfL Oythe | 3 – 5 | 1. FC Union Berlin | (AET) |
| SV Rot-Weiß Flatow | 0 – 9 | Tennis Borussia Berlin |
| TSG 1899 Hoffenheim | 6 – 7 | Bayer 04 Leverkusen | (PSO) |
| SC Regensburg | 0 – 2 | VfL Sindelfingen |
| 1. FFC Montabaur | 0 – 6 | SC Freiburg |
| 1. FC Gera 03 | 1 – 6 | FF USV Jena |
| TSV Schwaben Augsburg | 1 – 0 | FFC Wacker München |
| SV Eintracht Seekirch | 0 – 3 | ASV Hagsfeld |
| SV Rot-Weiß Göcklingen | 2 – 4 | SV Dirmingen | (AET) |

== 2nd round ==
In the second round Bayern Munich defeated title holder 1. FFC Frankfurt who was for the first time since 1998 not present in the DFB-Pokal final. The other match between clubs from the Bundesliga was won by SG Essen-Schönebeck against HSV Borussia Friedenstal.

19 October 2008
| DJK Arminia Ibbenbüren | 1 – 0 | FC Gütersloh 2000 |
| SV Werder Bremen | 1 – 10 | FCR 2001 Duisburg |
| FFV Neubrandenburg | 2 – 4 | VfL Wolfsburg |
| Magdeburger FFC | 1 – 6 | Mellendorfer TV |
| SG Wattenscheid 09 | 2 – 0 | FFC Oldesloe |
| 1. FC Union Berlin | 0 – 2 | 1. FC Lokomotive Leipzig |
| Tennis Borussia Berlin | 1 – 6 | 1. FFC Turbine Potsdam |
| Bayer 04 Leverkusen | 1 – 1 | Hamburger SV | (AET) (Hamburg won 4 – 3 on penalties) |
| SG Essen-Schönebeck | 4 – 1 | HSV Borussia Friedenstal |
| TSV Schwaben Augsburg | 1 – 5 | SC Freiburg |
| 1. FFC 08 Niederkirchen | 2 – 7 | SC 07 Bad Neuenahr |
| TSV Crailsheim | 3 – 1 | ASV Hagsfeld |
| FC Bayern Munich | 1 – 0 | 1. FFC Frankfurt |
| SC Sand | 3 – 2 | SV Dirmingen |
| FF USV Jena | 1 – 3 | 1. FC Saarbrücken |
| VfL Sindelfingen | 3 – 0 | FSV Jägersburg |

== 3rd round ==
9 November 2008
| DJK Arminia Ibbenbüren | 0 – 2 | VfL Sindelfingen |
| 1. FC Lokomotive Leipzig | 1 – 4 | SG Essen-Schönebeck |
| Mellendorfer TV | 0 – 5 | 1. FFC Turbine Potsdam |
| SC 07 Bad Neuenahr | 2 – 5 | FC Bayern Munich |
| VfL Wolfsburg | 2 – 0 | TSV Crailsheim |
| 1. FC Saarbrücken | 1 – 2 | SC Freiburg |
| SG Wattenscheid 09 | 4 – 2 | SC Sand |
10 December 2008
| FCR 2001 Duisburg | 5 – 0 | Hamburger SV |

== Quarter-finals ==
21 December 2008
| FC Bayern Munich | 1–1 | FCR 2001 Duisburg | (AET) (Duisburg won 5 – 4 on penalties) |
| SC Freiburg | 0–2 | VfL Wolfsburg |
| SG Essen-Schönebeck | 1–2 | SG Wattenscheid 09 | (AET) |
8 February 2009
| VfL Sindelfingen | 0–1 | 1. FFC Turbine Potsdam |

== Semi-finals ==
11 April 2009
| FCR 2001 Duisburg | 3–1 | VfL Wolfsburg |
13 April 2009
| 1. FFC Turbine Potsdam | 3–0 | SG Wattenscheid 09 |

== Final ==
30 May 2009
16:30 (CEST)

| Turbine Potsdam | 0 – 7 | FCR 2001 Duisburg |
|---|---|---|
| | | Bajramaj 28'; Kiesel 38' 47'; Maes 50'; Grings 54' 86'; Popp 90' |

Olympic Stadium (Berlin)
Attendance: 20,000
Referee: Martina Storch-Schäfer

1. FFC TURBINE POTSDAM 71:
GK | (Germany) Desirée Schumann
DF | (Germany) Bianca Schmidt
DF | (Germany) Stefanie Drews
DF | (Germany) Babett Peter
MF | (Germany) Monique Kerschowski | Booked
MF | (Germany) Viola Odebrecht | (substituted off) 46'
MF | (Germany) Jennifer Zietz
MF | (Germany) Isabel Kerschowski
FW | (Norway) Leni Larsen Kaurin | (substituted off) 55'
FW | (Germany) Anja Mittag
FW | (Germany) Tabea Kemme
Substitutes:
DF | (Germany) Marie-Louise Bagehorn | (substituted on) 46'
MF | (Germany) Jessica Wich | (substituted on) 55'
Manager:
(Germany) Bernd Schröder

FC RUMELN 2001 DUISBURG:
| GK | 1 | (Germany) Kathrin Längert |
| DF | | (Germany) Linda Bresonik |
| DF | | (Germany) Sonja Fuss |
| DF | | (Germany) Annike Krahn |
| DF | | (Germany) Alexandra Popp |
| MF | | (Germany) Marina Hegering | (substituted off) 70' |
| MF | | (Germany) Annemieke Kiesel | (substituted off) 56' |
| MF | | (Germany) Femke Maes |
| MF | | (Germany) Fatmire Bajramaj |
| MF | | (Germany) Simone Laudehr | (substituted off) 75' |
| FW | | (Germany) Inka Grings |
Substitutes:
| MF | | (Germany) Elena Hauer | (substituted on) 70' |
| MF | | (Germany) Jennifer Oster | (substituted on) 56' |
| FW | | (Germany) Turid Knaak | (substituted on) 75' |
Manager:
(Germany) Martina Voss

MATCH RULES

- 90 minutes.
- 30 minutes of extra-time if necessary, except in the final.
- Penalty shootout if scores still level.
- Seven named substitutes
- Maximum of 3 substitutions.
