= Turid Knaak =

German footballer (born 1991)

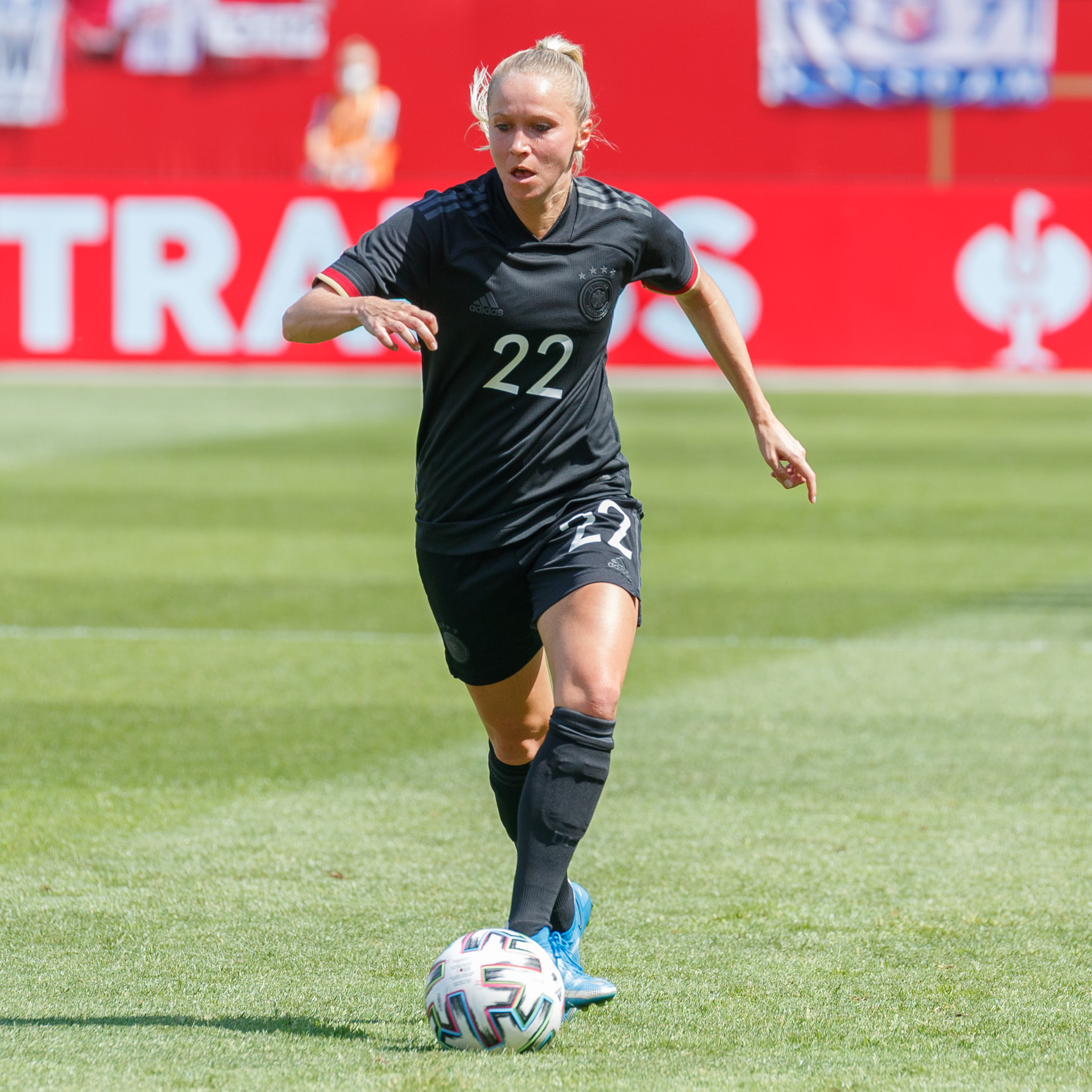
- Turid Knaak with Germany in 2021

Personal information
- Full name: Turid Knaak
- Date of birth: 24 January 1991 (age 35)
- Place of birth: Essen, Germany
- Height: 1.68 m (5 ft 6 in)
- Positions: Attacking midfielder; striker

Youth career
- SC Rellinghausen
- SC Steele 03/20
- –2003: SGS Essen
- 2003–2007: FCR 2001 Duisburg

Senior career*
Years	Team	Apps	(Gls)
2007–2011	FCR 2001 Duisburg	72	(13)
2011–2017	Bayer Leverkusen	102	(20)
2014	→ Arsenal (loan)	4	(0)
2017–2020	SGS Essen	64	(16)
2020–2021	Atlético Madrid	26	(2)
2021–2022	VfL Wolfsburg	16	(0)

International career
2006	Germany U15	4	(5)
2006–2008	Germany U17	19	(9)
2009–2010	Germany U19	18	(7)
2010	Germany U20	7	(0)
2010	Germany U23	2	(0)
2018–2022	Germany	16	(2)
- * Club domestic league appearances and goals

Turid Knaak (born 24 January 1991) is a German former footballer. She played as an attacking midfielder or a striker for Bundesliga club VfL Wolfsburg and the Germany women's national team.

== Club career ==
Knaak started her professional career at FCR Duisburg with whom she won the German Cup and the UEFA Women's Cup. For the 2011–12 season she transferred to Bayer 04 Leverkusen.

On 4 July 2014, she joined Arsenal on a two-month loan, coming off the bench to make her debut in the FA WSL Cup two days later, in a 3–0 win over Chelsea, and four days later, she was named in the starting line up against the London Bees, scoring twice in a 7–0 cup win. She made one more cup appearance in a 4–0 win over Millwall, and then three appearances in the FA WSL, before returning to Leverkusen for the start of the 2014–15 Bundesliga season.

== Career statistics ==
=== International ===
As of 18 September 2021

Germany
Year	Apps	Goals
2018	5	1
2019	7	1
2020	3	0
2021	1	0
Total	16	2

=== International goals ===
Scores and results list Germany's goal tally first:

Knaak – goals for Germany
#	Date	Location	Opponent	Score	Result	Competition
1.	10 June 2018	Hamilton, Canada	Canada	3–2	3–2	Friendly
2.	31 August 2019	Kassel, Germany	Montenegro	7–0	10–0	UEFA Women's Euro 2021 qualifying

== Honours ==
FCR 2001 Duisburg

- Bundesliga Runner-up: 2007–08, 2009–10
- DFB-Pokal: 2008–09, 2009–10
- UEFA Women's Cup: 2008–09

Atlético Madrid

- Supercopa de España: Winner 2020–21

VfL Wolfsburg

- Bundesliga: 2021–22
- DFB-Pokal: 2021–22

Germany U17

- UEFA Women's U17 Championship: Winner 2008
- FIFA U17 Women's World Cup third place: 2008
- FIFA U-20 Women's World Cup: Winner 2010
