= Femke Maes =

Belgian footballer

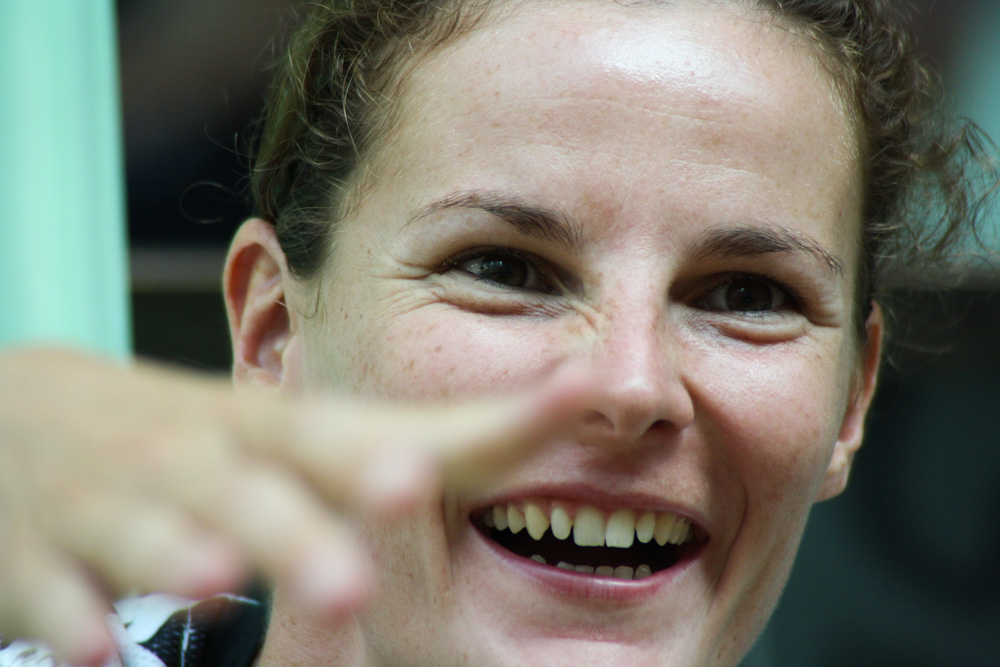
- Maes in 2010

Personal information
- Date of birth: 22 February 1980 (age 46)
- Place of birth: Lokeren, Belgium
- Height: 1.70 m (5 ft 7 in)
- Position: Midfielder

Youth career
- 1987–1990: FC Daknam
- 1990–1994: Sinaai Girls

Senior career*
Years	Team	Apps	(Gls)
1994–1998	RSC Anderlecht		
1998–2002	Eendracht Aalst		
2002–2007	Rapide Wezemaal		
2007–2008	Willem II	19	(4)
2008	Djurgården	10	(2)
2009–2011	FCR 2001 Duisburg	54	(18)

International career
1997–1998	Belgium U19	6	(3)
1996–2009	Belgium	85	(25)
- * Club domestic league appearances and goals

Femke Maes (pronounced [ˈfɛmkə ˈmaːs]; born 22 February 1980) is a Belgian former footballer who played as a midfielder.

== Career ==
Maes played for six different clubs and featured in the Belgium national team from 1996 to 2009. She kept the record of top scorer for Belgium until 2015 and still holds the record of most matches as of 2016.

== Honours ==
RSC Anderlecht

- Eerste Klasse: 1994–95, 1996–97, 1997–98
- Belgian Cup: 1995–96, 1997–98

Eendracht Aalst

- Eerste Klass: 1998–99, 1999–2000, 2000–01, 2001–02
- Belgian Cup: 1999–2000, 2001–02

Rapide Wezemaal

- Eerste Klass: 2003–04, 2004–05, 2005–06, 2006–07
- Belgian Cup: 2002–03, 2003–04, 2006–07

FCR 2001 Duisburg

- Bundesliga: runner-up 2009–10
- DFB-Pokal: 2008–09, 2009–10
- UEFA Women's Cup: 2008–09

Individual

- Best player Eerste Klasse: 2004–05, 2006–07
- Best player Eredivisie: 2007–08

== International goals ==
No.	Date	Venue	Opponent	Score	Result	Competition
1.	20 April 1996	Namur, Belgium	Scotland	1–0	6–1	UEFA Women's Euro 1997 qualifying
2.	4 May 1996	Waregem, Belgium	Republic of Ireland	2–1	5–1	UEFA Women's Euro 1997 qualifying
3.	18 May 1996	Toftir, Faroe Islands	Faroe Islands	6–0	9–0	UEFA Women's Euro 1997 qualifying
4.	28 September 1996	Michalovce, Slovakia	Slovakia	1–1	2–1	UEFA Women's Euro 1997 qualifying
5.	19 May 1997	Livadeia, Greece	Greece	2–?	2–1	Friendly
6.	16 October 1999	Machelen, Belgium	Austria	1–1	3–1	UEFA Women's Euro 2001 qualifying
7.	16 October 1999	Machelen, Belgium	Austria	2–1	3–1	UEFA Women's Euro 2001 qualifying
8.	6 November 1999	Wavre, Belgium	Poland	3–1	4–1	UEFA Women's Euro 2001 qualifying
9.	1 December 1999	Llanelli, Wales	Wales	1–0	2–0	UEFA Women's Euro 2001 qualifying
10.	1 December 1999	Llanelli, Wales	Wales	2–0	2–0	UEFA Women's Euro 2001 qualifying
11.	15 April 2000	Horn, Austria	Austria	2–0	3–0	UEFA Women's Euro 2001 qualifying
12.	13 August 2000	Etten Leur, Belgium	Scotland	4–3	4–3	Friendly
13.	4 October 2000	Echt, Netherlands	Netherlands	2–3	2–3	Friendly
14.	6 April 2002	Fußach, Austria	Austria	3–?	4–2	2003 FIFA Women's World Cup qualification
15.	3 May 2003	Fauldhouse, Scotland	Scotland	2–2	2–2	
16.	7 March 2004	Strombeek-Bever, Belgium	Norway	1–2	1–6	UEFA Women's Euro 2005 qualifying
17.	5 November 2005	Las Rozas de Madrid, Spain	Spain	1–1	3–2	2007 FIFA Women's World Cup qualification
18.	22 April 2006	Brussels, Belgium	Spain	1–4	2–4	2007 FIFA Women's World Cup qualification
19.	4 November 2006	Cartaxo, Portugal	Portugal	4–0	4–1	Friendly
20.	17 February 2008	Barry, Wales	Wales	1–0	1–0	UEFA Women's Euro 2009 qualifying
21.	27 April 2008	Ath, Belgium	Switzerland	1–0	3–1	UEFA Women's Euro 2009 qualifying
22.	27 April 2008	Ath, Belgium	Switzerland	2–1	3–1	UEFA Women's Euro 2009 qualifying
23.	23 September 2009	Gothenburg, Sweden	Sweden	1–2	1–2	2011 FIFA Women's World Cup qualification
24.	28 October 2009	Leuven, Belgium	Sweden	1–3	1–4	2011 FIFA Women's World Cup qualification
25.	26 November 2009	Písek, Czech Republic	Czech Republic	2–1	2–1	2011 FIFA Women's World Cup qualification
