= Olga Vasilyeva (footballer) =

Russian footballer (born 1974)

Personal information
- Full name: Olga Vasilyeva
- Date of birth: 13 March 1974 (age 52)
- Place of birth: Chuvash Republic, Soviet Union
- Height: 1.64 m (5 ft 5 in)
- Position: Defender

Senior career*
| Years | Team | Apps | (Gls) |
| 1990–1994 | Volzhanka Cheboksary | | |
| 1995–2002 | Lada Togliatti | | |
| 2003 | CSK VVS Samara | | |
| 2004–2006 | Nadezhda Noginsk | | |
| 2007–2009 | Zvezda 2005 Perm | | |

International career
- Azerbaijan

Managerial career
- 2021–2002: FC Rubin Kazan (women)
- * Club domestic league appearances and goals

Olga Vasilyeva is a former Russian football defender who represented Azerbaijan in international competitions. She spent her last three seasons in Zvezda Perm, with whom she won three Russian leagues and played the 2008-09 UEFA Women's Cup Final.

In 2021 she was named coach of the newly formed women's team of FC Rubin Kazan.
