= Alla Lyshafay =

Ukrainian footballer

Alla Ivanivna Lyshafay
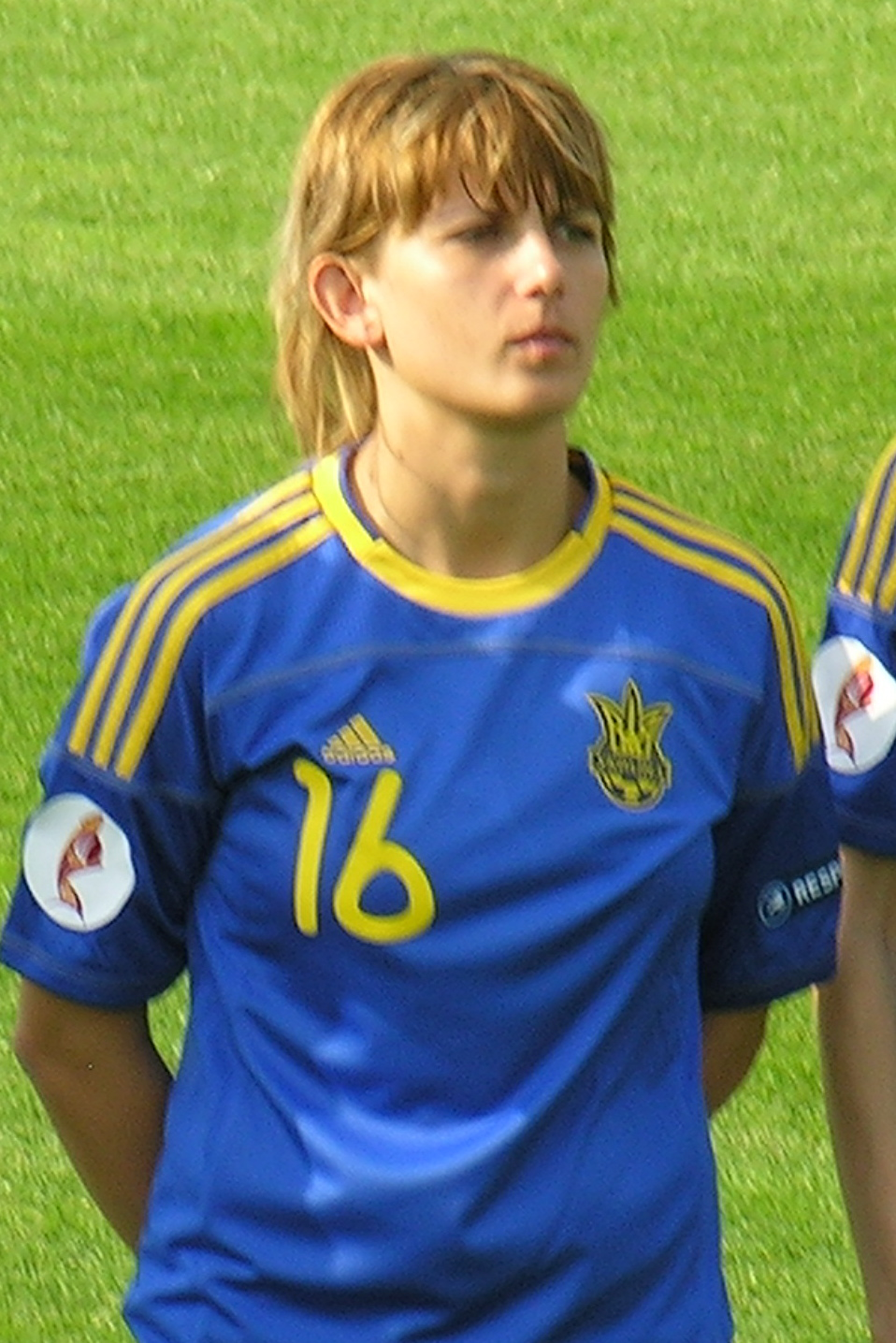

Personal information
- Full name: Alla Ivanivna Lyshafay
- Date of birth: 24 December 1983 (age 42)
- Place of birth: Chernihiv, Ukrainian SSR, Soviet Union
- Height: 1.63 m (5 ft 4 in)
- Position: Defender

Team information
- Current team: Zorky Krasnogorsk

Senior career*
Years	Team	Apps	(Gls)
- Lehenda Chernihiv
2004–2005	Gömrükçü Baku		(0)
2005–2006	Lehenda Chernihiv		
2006–2009	Zvezda Perm		
2010	Lehenda Chernihiv		
2011–2013	Zorky Krasnogorsk	44	(4)
2013-2015	Ryazan	27	(1)

International career
2009-2015	Ukraine	32	(0)
- * Club domestic league appearances and goals

Alla Ivanivna Lyshafay (Ukrainian: Алла Іванівна Лишафай) is an international football defender currently playing for Zorky Krasnogorsk in the Russian league. She previously played for Lehenda Chernihiv, Gömrükçü Baku and Zvezda Perm, with whom she played the 2008-09 UEFA Women's Cup final.

As a member of the Ukraine national team she played the 2009 UEFA Women's Euro. She scored against Slovenia in the qualifying play-offs.

== Honours ==
Lehenda Chernihiv

- Ukrainian Women's League (1) 2010,
- Women's Cup (1) 2010

Zvezda Perm

- Russian Women's Leagues (1) 2007
- Russian Women's Cup (1) 2007

Zorky Krasnogorsk

- Russian Women's Leagues champion: 2012–13
- Russian Cup runners-up: 2012
- Russian First Division champions: 2011

Ryazan

- Russian Women's Leagues (1) 2013
- Russian Women's Cup (1) 2014
