= Tatiana Repeikina =

Russian footballer (1973–2017)

Personal information
- Full name: Tatiana Vasilyevna Repeikina
- Date of birth: 18 March 1973
- Place of birth: Kazan, Soviet Union
- Date of death: 27 January 2017 (aged 43)
- Height: 1.70 m (5 ft 7 in)
- Position: Goalkeeper

Senior career*
Years	Team	Apps	(Gls)
1992	Gamma Kazan		
1993–1994	Borysfen Zaporizhzhia		
1995	Dynamo Kyiv		
1996–1999	Lada Togliatti		
2000–2003	Ryazan VDV		
2004	Gömrükçü Baku		
2005–2006	Ryazan VDV		
2007–2009	Zvezda Perm		
2010–	Mordovochka Saransk		
- * Club domestic league appearances and goals

Tatiana Repeikina (18 March 1973 – 27 January 2017) was a Russian football goalkeeper, playing for Mordovochka Saransk in the Russian Championship. She won three Russian leagues with Ryazan VDV and Zvezda Perm, and was a reserve in the 2009 UEFA Women's Cup final. She died on 27 January 2017 at the age of 43.
