= Marina Hegering =

German footballer

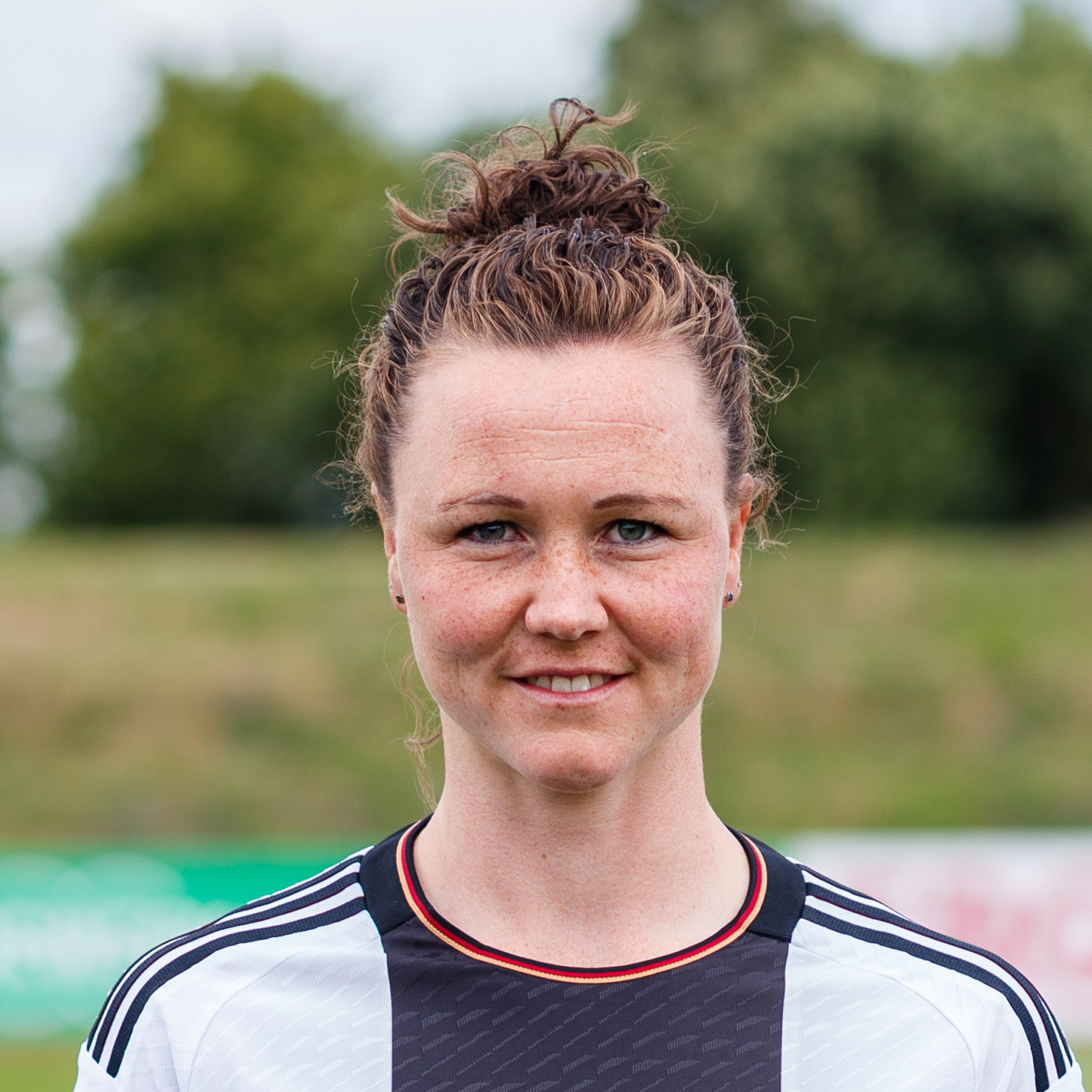
- Hegering with Germany in 2023

Personal information
- Full name: Marina Hegering
- Date of birth: 17 May 1990 (age 36)
- Place of birth: Bocholt, West Germany
- Height: 1.70 m (5 ft 7 in)
- Position: Defender

Team information
- Current team: 1. FC Köln
- Number: 33

Youth career
- 1995–2007: DJK SV Lowick

Senior career*
| Years | Team | Apps | (Gls) |
| 2007–2011 | FCR 2001 Duisburg | 43 | (6) |
| 2011–2017 | Bayer Leverkusen | 49 | (5) |
| 2017–2020 | SGS Essen | 54 | (5) |
| 2020–2022 | Bayern Munich | 24 | (7) |
| 2022–2025 | VfL Wolfsburg | 43 | (8) |
| 2025– | 1. FC Köln | 23 | (1) |

International career
| 2005–2007 | Germany U17 | 21 | (14) |
| 2007–2009 | Germany U19 | 11 | (2) |
| 2008–2010 | Germany U20 | 17 | (2) |
| 2019–2024 | Germany | 41 | (5) |
Medal record
Women's football
Representing Germany
Olympic Games
| Bronze medal – third place | 2024 Paris | Team |
UEFA Women's Championship
| Runner-up | 2022 England |
UEFA Women's Nations League
| Bronze medal – third place | 2024 France–Netherlands–Spain |
- * Club domestic league appearances and goals as of 21 November 2026

Marina Hegering (born 17 April 1990) is a German professional footballer who plays as a defender for Frauen-Bundesliga club 1. FC Köln. She also played for the German national team.

== Club career ==
Hegering began her career at DJK SV Lowick 1930. She played with them for twelve years, most recently in the male B-Youth performance class. At the age of 16, she switched to FCR 2001 Duisburg, for whose Bundesliga team she played until 2011. On 19 August 2007 (Day 1) she made her competitive debut in a 1–0 away win against Hamburger SV. She scored twice on 6 April 2008 (Day 14) in a 7–1 home win against TSV Crailsheim for her first Bundesliga goals. In the 2010/11 season, a persistent heel injury forced her to stay away from the game. During her club affiliation, she won the DFB Cup twice and the UEFA Cup once.

For the 2011/12 season she signed a two-year contract with Bayer 04 Leverkusen. After recovering from the heel injury, she played her first game for them on 13 April 2013 (matchday 18) in a goalless draw at home against SGS Essen. She joined SGS Essen at the start of the 2017/18 season. With her team she reached the final of the DFB Cup against VfL Wolfsburg on 4 July 2020 and scored twice but was defeated 4–2 on penalties.

On 24 April 2020, she was signed by Bayern Munich for the 2020/21 season and received a contract that expired on 30 June 2022.

She was signed by VfL Wolfsburg in 2022. She received a contract for four years until 2026. She holds a B+ trainer license.

== International career ==
After Hegering had played in the U-13 Niederrhein selection and the FVN national cup U-15 team, she made her debut on 3 September 2004 as a national player for the national U-15 team, which played the test international match against the selection of Canada lost 1–5. On 2 September 2005, she completed her seventh and last appearance in this age group in a goalless draw against this country selection. She scored a U-15 international goal on 29 August 2005 in a 7–0 win over Scotland, making it 6–0 in the 33rd minute.

For the U-17 national team, she played 22 international matches between 12 October 2005 and 7 July 2007 and scored one goal. Between 21 October 2007 and 19 July 2009, she played eleven international matches for the U-19 national team. She took part with her at the European Championship held from 13 to 25 July 2009 in Belarus. After she played in three preliminary round games, her team went home.

She took part in two World Cups for the U-20 national team, for which she played 18 times. Her first took place in Chile from 20 November to 7 December 2008. She and her team finished third after beating France 5–3. Her second World Cup took place from 13 July to 1 August 2010 in her own country, from which she and her team emerged as World Champions.

She made her debut for the senior German team on 6 April 2019 in Solna in a 2–1 win in a friendly against Sweden national team. For the 2019 FIFA World Cup, she was called up to the squad by national coach Martina Voss-Tecklenburg. She reached the quarterfinals with the national team.

On 18 June 2022, Hegering was called up to the 23-player Germany squad for the UEFA Women's Euro 2022. The German team reached the final, but were beaten by England and finished as runners-up. Hegering played in all six games. After the tournament, Hegering was voted into the "Eleven of the Tournament" by the UEFA coaching staff.

Hegering was called up to the Germany squad for the 2023 FIFA Women's World Cup.

On 3 July 2024, Hegering was called up to the Germany squad for the 2024 Summer Olympics.

After the 2024 Summer Olympics, where the Germans won the bronze medal, she announced her retirement from international football.

== Career statistics ==
=== International ===
Appearances and goals by national team and year
| National team | Year | Apps | Goals |
|---|---|---|---|
Germany
| Germany | 2019 | 9 | 0 |
| Germany | 2020 | 5 | 3 |
| Germany | 2021 | 5 | 0 |
| Germany | 2022 | 7 | 0 |
| Germany | 2023 | 8 | 1 |
| Germany | 2024 | 7 | 1 |
| Total | | 41 | 5 |

Scores and results list Germany's goal tally first, score column indicates score after each Hegering goal.

List of international goals scored by Marina Hegering
| No. | Date | Venue | Opponent | Score | Result | Competition |
|---|---|---|---|---|---|---|
| 1 | 7 March 2020 | Lagos Municipal Stadium, Lagos, Portugal | Norway | 4–0 | 4–0 | 2020 Algarve Cup |
| 2 | 19 September 2020 | Stadion Essen, Essen, Germany | Republic of Ireland | 1–0 | 3–0 | UEFA Women's Euro 2021 qualifying |
| 3 | 27 November 2020 | Audi Sportpark, Ingolstadt, Germany | Greece | 1–0 | 6–0 | UEFA Women's Euro 2021 qualifying |
| 4 | 1 December 2023 | Ostseestadion, Rostock, Germany | Denmark | 2–0 | 3–0 | 2023–24 UEFA Women's Nations League |
| 5 | 25 July 2024 | Stade Vélodrome, Marseille, France | Australia | 1–0 | 3–0 | 2024 Summer Olympics |

== Honours ==
FCR 2001 Duisburg

- UEFA Women's Champions League: 2008–09
- DFB-Pokal: 2008–09, 2009–10

Bayern Munich

- Frauen-Bundesliga: 2020–21

VfL Wolfsburg

- DFB-Pokal: 2022–23

Germany U20

- FIFA U-20 Women's World Cup: 2010, third place: 2008

Germany

- Summer Olympics bronze medal: 2024
- UEFA Women's Championship runner-up: 2022
- UEFA Women's Nations League third place: 2023–24

Individual

- UEFA Women's Championship Team of the Tournament: 2022
- Fritz Walter Medal Gold: 2009
- Silbernes Lorbeerblatt: 2024
