= KNVB Academy =

- Established: 1996
- Location: Zeist, Netherlands
- Coordinates: 52.088°N 5.290°E

The KNVB Academy is the Educational Department of the Royal Dutch Football Association (KNVB). The KNVB Academy was founded in 1996 to concentrate all educational programs for Dutch football in one body, and is headquartered at Zeist. The operations of the KNVB Academy are focused on development of coaches, referees and administrators in The Netherlands. Dutch coaching diplomas are UEFA approved.
