= Olga Sergaeva =

Russian footballer (born 1977)

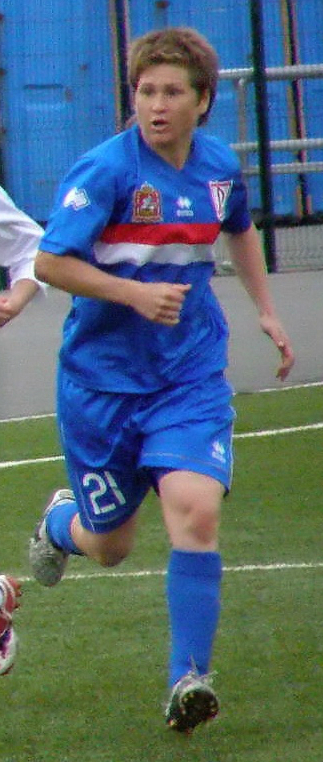

Personal information
- Full name: Olga Yuryevna Sergaeva
- Date of birth: 8 March 1977 (age 49)
- Place of birth: Togliatti, Soviet Union
- Height: 1.65 m (5 ft 5 in)
- Positions: Defender; midfielder

Senior career*
Years	Team	Apps	(Gls)
1998	Torpedo Togliatti		
1998–1999	Ryazan VDV		
2000–2002	Lada Togliatti		
2002–2003	Ryazan VDV		
2004–2006	Rossiyanka		(2)
2007–2009	Zvezda Perm		(3)
2010	Rossiyanka	23	(0)
2011	Zorky Krasnogorsk	11	(0)

International career
- Russia
- * Club domestic league appearances and goals

Olga Sergaeva is a retired Russian football defender, last played for Zorky Krasnogorsk in the Russian Championship. She previously played for Lada Togliatti, Ryazan VDV, Rossiyanka and Zvezda Perm, winning 7 championships with the three latter.

She has been a member of the Russian national team, and took part in the 2003 World Cup.

== Titles ==
- 7 Russian Leagues (1999, 2005, 2006, 2007, 2008, 2009, 2010)
- 6 Russian Cups (1998, 2002, 2005, 2006, 2007, 2010)
