= Kathrin Längert =

German footballer

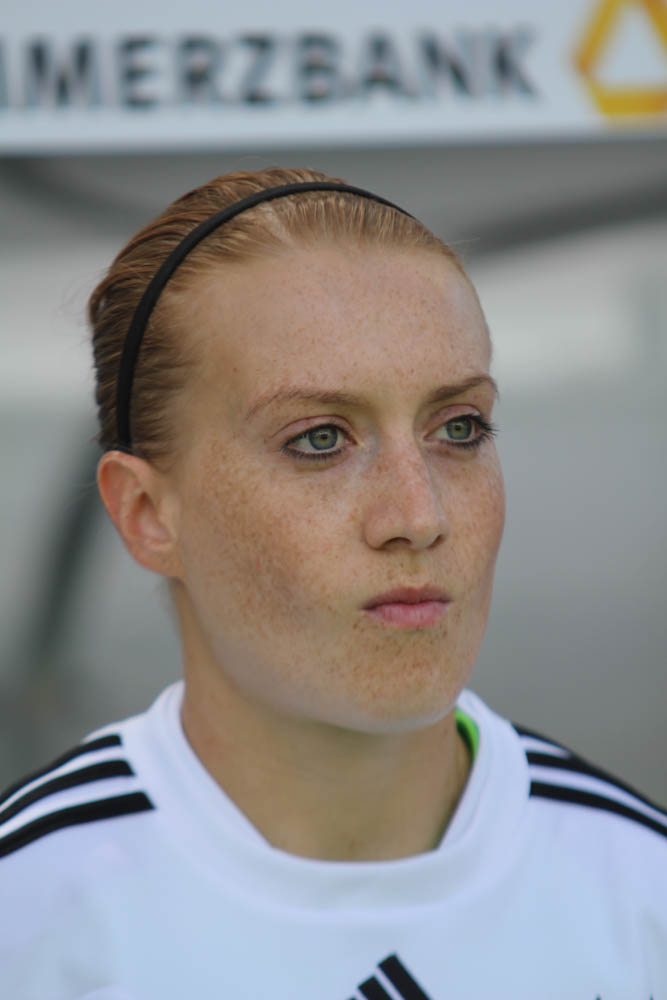
- Längert in 2013

Personal information
- Date of birth: 4 June 1987 (age 39)
- Place of birth: Essen, West Germany
- Height: 1.74 m (5 ft 9 in)
- Position: Goalkeeper

Youth career
- TuS 84/10 Essen
- SG Essen-Schönebeck
- FCR 2001 Duisburg

Senior career*
Years	Team	Apps	(Gls)
2006–2009	FCR 2001 Duisburg	53	(0)
2009–2014	Bayern Munich	93	(0)
2014–2015	FC Rosengård	14	(0)
2016–2017	FF USV Jena	14	(0)
Total		174	(0)

International career
2004	Germany U17	3	(0)
2004–2006	Germany U19	3	(0)
2010	Germany U23	1	(0)
- * Club domestic league appearances and goals

Kathrin Längert (born 4 June 1987) is a German former footballer who played as a goalkeeper.

== Career ==
Längert played in Germany for FCR 2001 Duisburg and Bayern Munich until May 2014, when she signed with FC Rosengård to play in the Swedish Damallsvenskan.

On 11 January 2016, almost two years since her move to Sweden, she returned to the Frauen-Bundesliga signing with FF USV Jena.
