= 2006–07 Frauen-Bundesliga =

Frauen-Bundesliga
- Season: 2006–07
- Champions: Frankfurt; 6th Bundesliga title 6th German title
- Relegated: Brauweiler Pulheim; Heike Rheine
- UEFA Cup: Frankfurt
- Matches: 132
- Goals: 515 (3.9 per match)
- Top goalscorer: (Germany) Birgit Prinz (28)
- Biggest home win: 12–0 Duisburg v Brauweiler Pulheim
- Biggest away win: 0–9 Bad Neuenahr v Frankfurt
- Highest scoring: 12–0 Duisburg v Brauweiler Pulheim

The 2006–07 Frauen-Bundesliga was the 17th season of the Frauen-Bundesliga, Germany's premier football league. It began on 10 September 2006 and ended on 10 June 2007.

== Final standings ==
Pos	Team	Pld	W	D	L	GF	GA	GD	Pts	Relegation
1	1. FFC Frankfurt (C)	22	19	3	0	91	17	+74	60	2006–07 Frauen-Bundesliga champions
2	FCR 2001 Duisburg	22	16	3	3	76	25	+51	51	
3	1. FFC Turbine Potsdam	22	13	5	4	51	23	+28	44	
4	FC Bayern Munich	22	12	2	8	35	29	+6	38	
5	SC 07 Bad Neuenahr	22	10	3	9	45	45	0	33	
6	SG Essen-Schönebeck	22	10	2	10	55	42	+13	32	
7	TSV Crailsheim (Note: Promoted from the 2. Bundesliga (women) last season)	22	9	3	10	33	37	−4	30	
8	VfL Wolfsburg	22	8	3	11	20	49	−29	27	
9	Hamburger SV	22	7	5	10	34	34	0	26	
10	SC Freiburg	22	8	1	13	36	57	−21	25	
11	FFC Heike Rheine	22	4	2	16	24	57	−33	14	Will be relegated to the 2. Bundesliga (women)
12	FFC Brauweiler Pulheim	22	0	0	22	15	100	−85	0	Will be relegated to the 2. Bundesliga (women)

(C) Champions

== Results ==
Home \ Away	FRA	DUI	POT	FCB	NEU	ESS	CRA	WOF	HSV	FRE	HRH	BRP
1. FFC Frankfurt		3–0	1–1	2–1	2–1	2–1	4–1	5–1	2–1	4–0	0–0	7–0
FCR 2001 Duisburg	1–6		0–1	3–0	1–0	4–2	2–0	7–0	2–2	6–2	4–0	12–0
1. FFC Turbine Potsdam	1–2	0–3		1–0	2–2	3–3	3–1	0–1	3–0	3–0	0–0	6–0
FC Bayern Munich	2–5	0–3	1–1		2–0	3–1	1–2	3–1	4–1	2–0	2–1	2–1
SC 07 Bad Neuenahr	0–9	1–3	2–5	1–1		6–0	2–2	1–3	3–2	1–3	3–0	6–1
SG Essen-Schönebeck	2–3	2–4	3–2	3–0	1–2		0–2	2–1	4–1	1–4	9–1	5–0
TSV Crailsheim	0–4	2–2	0–4	1–2	1–2	0–3		3–0	0–1	3–1	3–2	3–0
VfL Wolfsburg	0–7	1–3	0–2	1–0	2–0	0–4	0–0		2–1	0–0	0–4	2–0
Hamburger SV	2–2	2–2	1–3	0–2	0–1	0–0	1–0	0–0		3–1	4–0	3–0
SC Freiburg	1–9	0–3	2–4	0–3	2–6	2–1	0–3	4–0	1–5		4–0	4–0
FFC Heike Rheine	1–4	0–3	0–4	0–2	1–2	1–2	2–3	0–1	2–1	0–3		6–2
FFC Brauweiler Pulheim	0–8	1–8	1–2	1–2	2–3	1–6	1–3	3–4	0–3	0–2	1–3	

Legend: Blue = home team win; Yellow = draw; Red = away team win.

== Top scorers ==
Rank	Player	Team	Goals
1	(Germany) Birgit Prinz	FFC Frankfurt	28
2	(Germany) Inka Grings	FCR 2001 Duisburg	22
3	(Germany) Kerstin Garefrekes	FFC Frankfurt	21
