= 1. FFC Turbine Potsdam =

- Full name: 1. Frauenfußballclub Turbine Potsdam 71 e. V.
- Nicknames: Turbinen (Turbines); Torbienen (Goal-bees)
- Founded: 3 March 1971; 55 years ago
- Ground: Karl-Liebknecht-Stadion, Potsdam
- Capacity: 10,499
- President: Rolf Kutzmutz
- Head coach: Sebastian Middeke
- League: 2. Frauen-Bundesliga
- 2025–26: 2. Bundesliga, 11th of 14
- Website: https://www.turbine-potsdam.de
| Home colours | Away colours |

1. Frauenfußballclub Turbine Potsdam 71 e. V., commonly known as 1. FFC Turbine Potsdam (or Turbine Potsdam outside of Germany), is a German women's football club located in Potsdam, Brandenburg. They are one of the most successful women's football teams in Germany, having won six Frauen-Bundesliga championships and two UEFA Women's Champions League titles. They play in the Karl-Liebknecht-Stadion in the Babelsberg district of Potsdam, and their biggest rivals are Eintracht Frankfurt (previously 1. FFC Frankfurt).

Before the reunification of Germany, Turbine Potsdam were one of the predominant teams in East German women's football. They currently play in the 2. Frauen-Bundesliga, having been relegated from the Frauen-Bundesliga in 2025. They are the only team from the former East to have won the unified first league. The team also won the UEFA Women's Champions League competition in the 2004–05 season, beating the Swedish team of Djurgården/Älvsjö 5–1 overall in the final, and again in the 2009–10 season against Olympique Lyonnais on penalties.

In 2020, Turbine Potsdam entered into a three-year cooperation agreement with the men's football club Hertha BSC in the neighboring Berlin.

== History ==
=== The early years ===
BSG Turbine Potsdam was founded in 1955. The club was an "enterprise sports community" (Betriebssportgemeinschaft) (BSG), supported by the local energy supplier. The men's football team played with mediocre success on lower levels.

On New Year's Eve 1970, Bernd Schröder, an employee of the energy supplier, discovered a strange piece of paper on the company's blackboard. It said that a women's football team would be established on 3 March 1971. The identity of the person responsible for this paper was never established.

The women's team was founded on 3 March 1971, and Bernd Schröder became the first coach. The first match was played on 25 May 1971, at Empor Tangermünde and ended with a 3–0 win for Turbine. The first district championship was played a year later and was won by Turbine.

Schröder was always looking for new players. He concentrated on former track and field athletes who were dropped by their clubs. Schröder became a senior employee in his company, so he could offer jobs and flats for the new players.

=== 1979–1990: Championships and cheated letters ===
In 1979, the first unofficial women's football championship of the GDR was held unofficial as women's football was far from being recognized by the Olympic Games. Turbine was the favourite but missed the final tournament. They also missed the final tournament in 1980. The final tournament in 1981 was held in Potsdam and Schröder was under pressure. He held a training camp by the Baltic Sea. However, the team struggled during the qualification. The team was unbeaten in the final tournament and won their first championship. Each player received 50 East German mark and Schröder was awarded the title "Activist of socialist work".

Turbine also won the championships of 1982 and 1983. Their success was recognized in the rest of Europe and Turbine was invited for tournaments in the Netherlands and Italy. However, Turbine didn't receive any of these invitations. The GDR forbade the team to travel into capitalist countries. The club wasn't even allowed to travel to tournaments in other communist countries in case some teams from western Europe participated. Schröder once asked a Hungarian club to alter the list of teams. They replaced teams from Austria and Yugoslavia by teams from Bulgaria and Czechoslovakia.

The team went to Hungary and was accompanied by a member of the SED party. He realized that there was something wrong. Turbine played in the tournament and Schröder was banned internationally for a year. After the ban, Turbine was invited to a tournament in Poland. This time, Schröder himself altered the list of the teams. Once again the team was accompanied by an SED member who wanted to force the Polish club to send the Western European teams home. As a compromise, Turbine played a friendly match against the home team. The club was now banned from traveling outside the GDR until further notice.

In 1989, Turbine won their sixth and final GDR championship. Many players retired, and after the fall of the Berlin Wall, the company who supported the club ran into financial difficulties. On 1 January 1990, the BSG Turbine Potsdam became the SSV Turbine Potsdam. A few days later, Turbine played their first match against a team from Western Germany at an indoor tournament. While many male football players from the GDR were transferred to clubs from West Germany, most of the female players remained in the East. In 1991, Turbine finished the season as third and missed the qualification for the Bundesliga.

=== 1990–1997: Crisis and promotion ===
Turbine became champions of the Oberliga Nordost (second division) but failed in the promotion playoffs. Schröder stepped down from being the head coach after 21 years and became the manager. The club was suffering from financial problems and sometimes the officials were not sure if they could afford the travel to away matches. Many players also lost their jobs. Peter Raupach became the new coach, but he was not successful. Frank Lange took over for the 1993/94 season. He led his team to the championship. After a 3–2 win over Wattenscheid 09, Turbine won promotion to the Bundesliga.

The first Bundesliga match ended in disaster after Turbine lost 0–11 at home to FC Rumeln-Kaldenhausen. The team lost more and more matches and were knocked out in the cup. At the end of 1994, Turbine had to play at VfB Rheine. Schröder told Rheine's manager Alfred Werner that Lange would be fired if Turbine lost the match. Turbine lost the match but nothing happened at the press conference. Schröder wanted to discuss the situation in private with Lange, but the two were surrounded by journalists and players. Schröder couldn't escape and told Lange that he was fired.

Former player Sabine Seidel coached the team for the rest of the season. and Turbine got three Russian players in the winter break. The team struggled to avoid relegation and finished sixth in the northern group. Lothar Müller became the new coach. He was from Western Berlin and now Turbine became an option for players from Western Berlin. Strengthened by players from Tennis Borussia Berlin, the defense was much better but the team again finished in sixth.

The 1996/97 season was the last season where the Bundesliga was played in two groups. To qualify for the single-tier Bundesliga it was necessary to finish the season among the first four teams. Turbine finished fifth after a rollercoaster season but managed to qualify after a playoff. The team reached the cup semi-final for the first time but lost 2–3 against Eintracht Rheine. The club presented Eckart Düwiger as their new coach for the new season. Düwiger was Turbine's first full-time coach.

=== 1997–2005: The long way to the top ===
Turbine acquired the German international Ariane Hingst from Hertha Zehlendorf. Her integration into the team was not easy as Hingst kept a certain distance to her teammates. She did not want to go into the "east" of Germany. The situation changed when the club's main sponsor went bankrupt and the club couldn't pay Düwiger's salary. He resigned and Bernd Schröder became the head coach again. Striker Conny Pohlers returned from TuS Niederkirchen during the season and Turbine finished the 1997/98 season in sixth place.

On 12 March 1999, the women's section of the SSV Turbine Potsdam decided to establish a separate club. The 1. FFC Turbine Potsdam was founded on 1 April 1999. The team finished the season in fourth place. The season saw a legendary 4–4 draw at 1. FFC Frankfurt. Frankfurt led 4–0 at half time before Potsdam came back to draw the game. This was the beginning of the rivalry between the two clubs. Turbine reached the cup semi-final for the second time. However, the FCR Duisburg won 2–0.

The last season in the 20th century was finished in fourth place again. For the first time, Turbine had a positive record and was unbeaten at home. Ariane Hingst became the team captain and remained in this position until her departure in 2007. Schröder took a certain risk with this decision as he wanted Hingst to take more responsibility. This decision would pay off in the following years. In the same year, the first-ever German Juniors Championship was held. Turbine's girls' team won this title with a 7–1 win over Bayern Munich. Viola Odebrecht became a regular starter in the first team next season.

In 2001, Turbine finished in second place. For the third time, the team reached the cup semi-final but failed in the penalty shootout against FFC Flaesheim-Hillen. The team remained in second place in the 2001/02 season. They acquired goalkeeper Nadine Angerer before the season. Conny Pohlers became Turbine's first league top scorer with 27 goals. However, even their fourth cup semi-final was not successful. This time, the team lost 2–3 against the Hamburger SV. They acquired striker Petra Wimbersky from Munich, young international Navina Omilade from Brauweiler and the highly talented Anja Mittag from Aue.

The season started with a shock first cup round exit to second division side Hamburger SV. The Bundesliga season was much better. On the last day of the season, titleholder Frankfurt went to Potsdam's Karl Liebknecht Stadion for the final showdown. Frankfurt was two points clear at the top so Potsdam had to win the match to clinch the title. This Endspiel went into the record books of German women's football, with an attendance of 7,900, the league's record. The match was also shown live on TV. In the 89th minute, Petra Wimbersky scored a goal and the crowds began to celebrate. However, she was offside according to the lineswomen and Frankfurt became champions.

Four Turbine players traveled along with the German national team to the 2003 World Cup in the USA. Nadine Angerer, Ariane Hingst, Viola Odebrecht and Conny Pohlers went on to become world champions. In the third round of the German cup, Potsdam faced the Hamburger SV again. Hamburg led 1–0 until the dying minutes of the game until Viola Odebrecht equalized with a desperate shot. Jennifer Zietz scored the game-winner in overtime. Turbine reached the final for the first time where they faced their archrivals 1. FFC Frankfurt. Turbine dominated the match, won 3–0 and clinched their first German cup. During the winter break, Turbine won the Indoor Championship. This was their first post-reunification trophy.

In the league, Turbine went from victory to victory. After a 3–1 win over Duisburg, Turbine had a one-point lead over Frankfurt before the last match. Turbine went to Frankfurt for the deciding match. A crowd of 4,800 saw Turbine's 7–2 win. Potsdam finally won their first post-reunification championship. The title qualified the team for the UEFA Women's Cup.

Turbine was unbeaten in Europe and reached the final where they faced Djurgårdens IF/Älvsjö from Sweden. The first match in Stockholm saw a 2–0 win for Turbine. In the second leg, early goals by Conny Pohlers and Petra Wimbersky secured a 3–1 win and Turbine's biggest triumph to date. The match in Potsdam was attended by 8,700, the largest crowd ever at a Turbine home match. Turbine could also defend the German cup and Indoor Championship, both with wins over Frankfurt. However, the 2004/05 Bundesliga season wasn't a success and Turbine finished in third place.

=== 2005–2008 : Rebuilding ===
Frankfurt led the Bundesliga for a long time during the 2005/06 season. Then they lost 2–1 at Freiburg and Potsdam came from behind to take the lead. Turbine then won 6–2 at Frankfurt (with four goals scored by Conny Pohlers) and a comfortable 2–0 win over Duisburg. After a 3–1 at Hamburg, Turbine clinched their second post-reunification championship. Conny Pohlers scored 36 goals and was the league's top scorer for the second time. In the cup final, Potsdam won 2–0 against Frankfurt thanks to two late goals by Isabel Kerschowski and Petra Wimbersky. However, Frankfurt won the UEFA Women's cup by two wins over Potsdam.

After the season closed, Wimbersky left the club to Frankfurt. Young Finnish international Essi Sainio was the only prominent new player in Turbine's line-up. After a poor start into the season and an early cup exit to Duisburg, Turbine was far from defending their title. In March 2007, Ariane Hingst announced her departure to Djurgårdens. This was followed by the announcements of Conny Pohlers and Navina Omilade that they were leaving the club after the season. Coach Bernd Schröder had to face significant criticism by the fans. However, Schröder put his departing players on the reserve bench and put some young players such as 18-year-old defender Babett Peter or the 16-year-old striker Bianca Schmidt into the starting line-up. This decision would pay off: Turbine was unbeaten in their last 13 matches and clinched the third place.

At the beginning of 2008, Turbine signed the Norway international Leni Larsen Kaurin, the only Norwegian woman footballer playing in Germany. At the end of the 2008/09 season, Turbine won a bit surprised the hard and close contest to the championship against Bayern Munich and Duisburg.

=== 2008–2012: Rise to European top ===
In the 2011–12 season, Turbine Potsdam secured their fourth consecutive Bundesliga title, becoming the first team to achieve this feat since the league's founding. Although they fell short in the UEFA Women's Champions League, exiting in the semifinals, the club remained a consistent force domestically and in Europe. Key players like Genoveva Añonma, who became the Bundesliga's top scorer in 2012, helped solidify Potsdam's position at the top of German women's football.

In the following years, Turbine maintained strong league performances, often finishing in Champions League qualifying positions, though they were eventually overtaken by the rising dominance of clubs like Wolfsburg and Bayern Munich.

=== 2012–2022: Two Cup finals and the end of the Schröder era ===
Despite the departure of key national players like Babett Peter, Bianca Schmidt, and Viola Odebrecht in 2012, Turbine Potsdam remained competitive. They secured Champions League qualification in the 2012–13 season and reached the DFB-Pokal final, losing 2–3 to VfL Wolfsburg. Yūki Nagasato finished as the league's top scorer with 18 goals.

Over the following seasons, Potsdam consistently fought for top positions. In 2013–14, they once again reached the Champions League semifinals and finished third in the league. The 2014–15 season saw a fourth-place finish and another DFB-Pokal final defeat to Wolfsburg, this time 0–3. Long-time head coach Bernd Schröder announced his retirement after the season, concluding a remarkable 45-year tenure.

In 2015–16, Turbine endured a difficult campaign, finishing in seventh place—their worst under Schröder. Co-trainer Matthias Rudolph took over and helped stabilize the team, guiding them to a third-place finish in 2016–17 and fourth in 2017–18. After the 2019–20 season, Rudolph departed and was succeeded by Sofian Chahed. Under Chahed, Potsdam reached the DFB-Pokal final in 2022 but suffered a heavy 0–4 defeat to Wolfsburg. Shortly thereafter, Chahed was replaced by Sebastian Middeke.

=== 2022–present: Relegation and rebuilding ===
A disastrous start to the 2022–23 season left Turbine at the bottom of the table, prompting the dismissal of Middeke. After brief interim tenures by Dirk Heinrichs and Sven Weigang, Marco Gebhardt was appointed. However, following a 1–5 loss to Bayer Leverkusen in May 2023, Turbine's first-ever relegation after 29 years in the Bundesliga was confirmed.

The team struggled early in the 2023–24 2. Bundesliga season, losing its first three matches without scoring. However, a dramatic turnaround followed with seven consecutive wins without conceding a goal. On the final matchday, Turbine secured the league title and immediate promotion.

Despite this success, a poor start to the 2024–25 Bundesliga campaign led to the dismissal of both Gebhardt and sporting director Dirk Heinrich in October. Austrian coach Kurt Russ took over, but he was unable to prevent a swift return to the second division. Turbine managed just a single point throughout the entire season, coming from a goalless home draw against Carl Zeiss Jena, finishing bottom of the table.

== Colours and badge ==
The club colours are blue and white. The team plays their home games in an all-blue kit while they use an all-white kit on away matches. Sometimes the players wear a combination of the home and away kit. The third kit is all-red.

The outer side of the badge is a dark blue circle with the club name written on the top and the bottom. There are three stars each on the left and the right side. The stars don't have a certain meaning. The left part of the inner side shows an eagle. It is taken from the badge of state of Brandenburg. The upper right part shows football. The lower right side shows the letters "TP" which stand for "Turbine Potsdam".

== Stadium ==
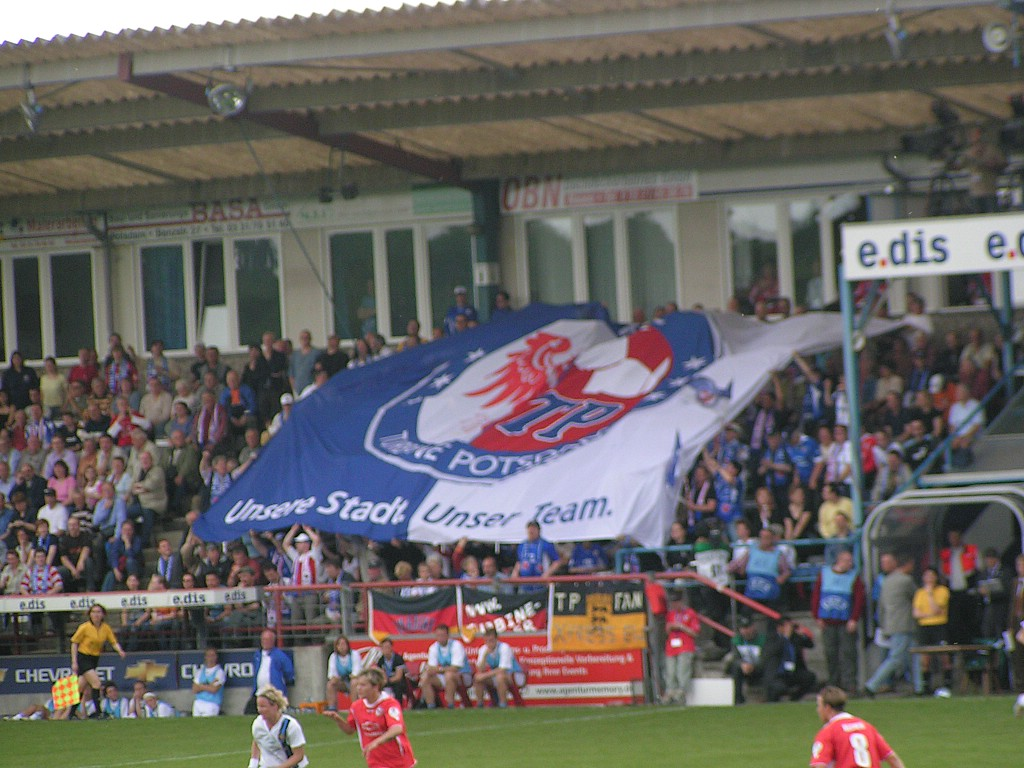
Turbine flag at Karl-Liebknecht-Stadion

The club plays their home games at Karl Liebknecht Stadion in Potsdam-Babelsberg. They share this ground with the men's Regionalliga side SV Babelsberg 03. The stadium has a capacity of 9,254 places. The main stand has 1,482 mostly covered seats

== Supporters ==
The club has two fan clubs. The Turbine-Adler (Turbine Eagles) was founded on 4 December 2004. The other fan club Turbine-Fans BaWü is a regional organization by fans from the state of Baden-Württemberg.

== Players ==
=== Current squad ===
As of 12 July 2026

Note: Flags indicate national team as defined under FIFA eligibility rules; some limited exceptions apply. Players may hold more than one non-FIFA nationality.

| No. | Pos. | Nation | Player |
|---|---|---|---|
| — | FW | ISR | Tamar Goren |
| — | GK | SUI | Emilie Gavillet |
| 1 | GK | GER | Juliane Schmid |
| 4 | DF | GER | Julia Hüsch |
| 5 | DF | USA | Catherine Nolan |
| 6 | MF | JPN | Yuna Matsubara |
| 7 | FW | GER | Amani Mahmoud |
| 8 | MF | DEN | Sofia Rejkjær |
| 9 | MF | AUT | Rebecca Lins |
| 10 | MF | USA | Madelyn Smith |
| 11 | MF | GER | Leonie Preußler |
| 14 | MF | AUT | Elena Gößler |

| No. | Pos. | Nation | Player |
|---|---|---|---|
| 13 | DF | GER | Marike Dommasch |
| 16 | MF | USA | Barrett Eidson |
| 17 | DF | GER | Johanna Bobbe |
| 19 | FW | PAN | Lineth Cedeño |
| 20 | DF | GER | Bianca Schmidt |
| 21 | DF | HUN | Anna Túróczy |
| 22 | FW | BRA | Thalia Souza |
| 23 | DF | JPN | Mariko Kubo |
| 25 | DF | GER | Merle Kirschstein |
| 38 | FW | GER | Laura Lindner |

=== Out on loan ===
Note: Flags indicate national team as defined under FIFA eligibility rules; some limited exceptions apply. Players may hold more than one non-FIFA nationality.

| No. | Pos. | Nation | Player |

=== Former players ===
- (Germany) Nadine Angerer
- (Germany) Anja Mittag
- (Germany) Tabea Kemme
- (Germany) Babett Peter
- (Germany) Anna Gasper
- (Germany) Laura Radke
- (Scotland) Lisa Evans
- (Italy) Ilaria Mauro
- (Brazil) Cristiane
- (United States) Ingrid Wells
- (Serbia) Aida Kardovic
- (Canada) Paige Culver
- (Canada) Jessica De Filippo
- (Sweden) Antonia Goransson
- (Poland) Martyna Wiankowska
- (China) Wang Fei
- (Netherlands) Chantal de Ridder
- (Czech Republic) Klara Cahynova
- (Kazakhstan) Amina Bibossynova
- (North Macedonia) Natasa Andonova
- (France) Marina Makanza

== Honours ==
- Frauen-Bundesliga
  - Winners (6): 2003–04, 2005–06, 2008–09, 2009–10, 2010–11, 2011–12
  - Runners-up: 2000–01, 2001–02, 2002–03, 2012–13
- German Democratic Republic Women's Football Championship
  - Winners: 1981, 1982, 1983, 1985, 1986, 1989
- DFB Pokal
  - Winners (3): 2003–04, 2004–05, 2005–06
  - Runners-up: 2008–09, 2010–11, 2012–13, 2014–15, 2021–22
- UEFA Women's Cup/Champions League
  - Winners: 2004–05, 2009–10
  - Runners-up: 2005–06, 2010–11

=== Indoor football ===
- DFB-Hallenpokal: 2004, 2005, 2008, 2009, 2010, 2013, 2014

=== Youth ===
- German Juniors Champions: 2000, 2003, 2004, 2005, 2006, 2008, 2009

== Record in UEFA competitions ==
All results (away, home and aggregate) list Turbine Potsdam's goal tally first.

| Competition | Round | Club | Away | Home | Aggregate |
|---|---|---|---|---|---|
| 2004–05 | Second qualifying round | (France) Montpellier | – | 6–0 | – |
| 2004–05 | Second qualifying round | (Poland) Wrocław | – | 4–1 | – |
| 2004–05 | Second qualifying round | (Italy) Torres Sassari | – | 7–5 | – |
| 2004–05 | Quarter-final | (Russia) Energy Voronezh | 1–1 ^{a} | 4–1 | 5–2 |
| 2004–05 | Semi-final | (Norway) Trondheim | 3–1 | 4–0 ^{a} | 7–1 |
| 2004–05 | Final | (Sweden) Djurgården Stockholm | 2–0 ^{a} | 3–1 | 5–1 |
| 2005–06 | Second qualifying round | (Austria) Neulengbach | 12–1 | – | – |
| 2005–06 | Second qualifying round | (Netherlands) Saestum Zeist | 2–0 | – | – |
| 2005–06 | Second qualifying round | (France) Montpellier (host) | 0–0 | – | – |
| 2005–06 | Quarter-final | (Iceland) Valur Reykjavík | 8–1 ^{a} | 11–1 | 19–2 |
| 2005–06 | Semi-final | (Sweden) Djurgården Stockholm | 5–2 | 2–3 ^{a} | 7–5 |
| 2005–06 | Final | (Germany) Frankfurt | 2–3 | 0–4 ^{a} | 2–7 |
| 2006–07 | Second qualifying round | (Belgium) Rapide Wezemaal | 1–0 | – | – |
| 2006–07 | Second qualifying round | (Netherlands) Saestum Zeist (host) | 2–2 | – | – |
| 2006–07 | Second qualifying round | (Czech Republic) Sparta Prague | 4–0 | – | – |
| 2006–07 | Quarter-final | (Denmark) Brøndby | 0–3 ^{a} | 2–1 | 2–4 |
| 2009–10 | Round of 32 | (Finland) Honka Espoo | 8–1 ^{a} | 8–0 | 16–1 |
| 2009–10 | Round of 16 | (Denmark) Brøndby | 4–0 | 1–0 ^{a} | 5–0 |
| 2009–10 | Quarter-final | (Norway) Røa Oslo | 5–0 | 5–0 ^{a} | 10–0 |
| 2009–10 | Semi-final | (Germany) Duisburg | 0–1 ^{a} | 1–0 a.e.t. | 1–1 (3–1 p) |
| 2009–10 | Final | (France) Olympique Lyon | 0–0 a.e.t. (7–6 p) ( (Spain) Getafe) | | |
| 2010–11 | Round of 32 | (Finland) Åland United Lemland | 9–0 ^{a} | 6–0 | 15–0 |
| 2010–11 | Round of 16 | (Austria) Neulengbach | 9–0 | 7–0 ^{a} | 16–0 |
| 2010–11 | Quarter-final | (France) Juvisy | 3–0 ^{a} | 6–2 | 9–2 |
| 2010–11 | Semi-final | (Germany) Duisburg | 2–2 ^{a} | 1–0 | 3–2 |
| 2010–11 | Final | (France) Olympique Lyon | 0–2 ( (England) London) | | |
| 2011–12 | Round of 32 | (Iceland) Þór/KA Akureyri | 6–0 ^{a} | 8–2 | 14–2 |
| 2011–12 | Round of 16 | (Scotland) Glasgow City | 7–0 | 10–0 ^{a} | 17–0 |
| 2011–12 | Quarter-final | (Russia) Rossiyanka Khimki | 3–0 | 2–0 ^{a} | 5–0 |
| 2011–12 | Semi-final | (France) Olympique Lyon | 1–5 ^{a} | 0–0 | 1–5 |
| 2012–13 | Round of 32 | (Belgium) Standard Liège | 3–1 ^{a} | 5–0 | 8–1 |
| 2012–13 | Round of 16 | (England) Arsenal | 1–2 ^{a} | 3–4 | 4–6 |
| 2013–14 | Round of 32 | (Hungary) Hungária Budapest | 5–0 ^{a} | 6–0 | 11–0 |
| 2013–14 | Round of 16 | (France) Olympique Lyon | 2–1 | 0–1 ^{a} | 2–2 (agr) |
| 2013–14 | Quarter-final | (Italy) Torres Sassari | 8–0 ^{a} | 4–1 | 12–1 |
| 2013–14 | Semi-final | (Germany) Wolfsburg | 2–4 | 0–0 ^{a} | 2–4 |

^{a} First leg.

== Season records ==
| Season | DDR-Oberliga | Position | Top scorer | DDR-Pokal | | |
|---|---|---|---|---|---|---|
| 1979 | 1 | ? | ? | | | |
| 1980 | 1 | ? | ? | | | |
| 1981 | 1 | Champion | ? | | | |
| 1982 | 1 | Champion | ? | | | |
| 1983 | 1 | Champion | ? | | | |
| 1984 | 1 | Finalist | ? | | | |
| 1985 | 1 | Champion | ? | | | |
| 1986 | 1 | Champion | ? | | | |
| 1987 | 1 | ? | ? | | | |
| 1988 | 1 | Finalist | ? | ? | | |
| 1989 | 1 | Champion | ? | ? | | |
| 1990 | 1 | ? | ? | ? | | |
| 1990–91 | 1 | 3 | ? | Finalist | | |
| Season | Level | Position | Top scorer | DFB-Pokal | Hallenpokal | Champions League |
| 1991–92 | 2 | 1 | ? | First round | | |
| 1992–93 | 2 | 4 | ? | First round | | |
| 1993–94 | 2 | 1 | ? | Round of 32 | | |
| 1994–95 | 1 | 6 | ? | Round of 16 | | |
| 1995–96 | 1 | 6 | ? | Round of 32 | | |
| 1996–97 | 1 | 5 | ? | Semi-finals | | |
| 1997–98 | 1 | 6 | Walther (7) | Round of 16 | First round | |
| 1998–99 | 1 | 4 | Pohlers (9) | Semi-finals | First round | |
| 1999–00 | 1 | 4 | Pohlers (17) | Quarter-finals | First round | |
| 2000–01 | 1 | 2nd | Pohlers (23) | Semi-finals | First round | |
| 2001–02 | 1 | 2nd | Pohlers (27) | Semi-finals | First round | |
| 2002–03 | 1 | 2nd | Pohlers (13) | Round of 32 | First round | |
| 2003–04 | 1 | 1st | Pohlers (18) | Champion | Champion | |
| 2004–05 | 1 | 3rd | Mittag, Pohlers (17) | Champion | Champion | Champion |
| 2005–06 | 1 | 1st | Pohlers (36) | Champion | Quarter-finals | Finalist |
| 2006–07 | 1 | 3rd | Pohlers, Schmidt (8) | Round of 32 | Quarter-finals | Quarter-finals |
| 2007–08 | 1 | 3rd | Wich (13) | Quarter-finals | Champion | |
| 2008–09 | 1 | 1st | Mittag (21) | Finalist | Champion | |
| 2009–10 | 1 | 1st | Mittag (17) | Semi-finals | Champion | Champion |
| 2010–11 | 1 | 1st | Mittag (15) | Finalist | | Finalist |
| 2011–12 | 1 | 1st | Añonman (22) | Quarter-finals | Quarter-finals | Semi-finals |
| 2012–13 | 1 | 2nd | Y. Nagasato (18) | Finalist | Champion | Round of 16 |
| 2013–14 | 1 | 3rd | Añonma (15) | Round of 32 | | Semi-finals |
| 2014–15 | 1 | 4th | Añonma (10) | Finalist | | |
| 2015–16 | 1 | 7th | Huth (13) | Quarterfinals | | |
| 2016–17 | 1 | 3rd | Kemme (10) | Round of 32 | | |
| 2017–18 | 1 | 4th | Huth (8) | Semi-finals | | |
| 2018–19 | 1 | 3rd | Prašnikar (9) | Quarterfinals | | |
| 2019–20 | 1 | 4th | Prašnikar (15) | Quarterfinals | | |
| 2020–21 | 1 | 4th | Cerci (8) | Quarterfinals | | |
| 2021–22 | 1 | 4th | Cerci (13) | Finalist | | |
| 2022–23 | 1 | 12th | De Filippo (2) | Round of 16 | | |
| 2023–24 | 2 | 1st | Schneider (7) | Second round | | |
| 2024–25 | 1 | 12th | five players (1) | Round of 16 | | |
| 2025–26 | 2 | 11th | Rana Okuma (9) | Round of 16 | | |
