= 2005–06 Frauen-Bundesliga =

Frauen-Bundesliga
- Season: 2005–06
- Champions: Turbine Potsdam; 2nd Bundesliga title 2nd German title
- Relegated: FSV Frankfurt; Sindelfingen
- UEFA Cup: Frankfurt; Turbine Potsdam
- Matches: 132
- Goals: 623 (4.72 per match)
- Top goalscorer: (Germany) Conny Pohlers (36)
- Biggest home win: 17–0 FFC Frankfurt v FSV Frankfurt
- Biggest away win: 0–13 FSV Frankfurt v Potsdam
- Highest scoring: 17–0 FFC Frankfurt v FSV Frankfurt

The 2005–06 Frauen-Bundesliga was the 16th season of the Frauen-Bundesliga, Germany's premier football league. It began on 14 August 2005 and ended on 5 June 2006.

== Final standings ==
Pos	Team	Pld	W	D	L	GF	GA	GD	Pts	Relegation
1	1. FFC Turbine Potsdam	22	19	2	1	115	13	+102	59	2005–06 Bundesliga (women) champions
2	FCR 2001 Duisburg	22	17	4	1	91	11	+80	55	
3	1. FFC Frankfurt (Note: 2004–05 Bundesliga (women) champion)	22	17	1	4	97	25	+72	52	
4	SC 07 Bad Neuenahr	22	14	2	6	61	40	+21	44	
5	Hamburger SV	22	10	3	9	42	40	+2	33	
6	SG Essen-Schönebeck	22	9	3	10	44	49	−5	30	
7	SC Freiburg	22	9	5	8	45	48	−3	29 (Note: SC Freiburg was awarded a 3-point penalty.)	
8	FC Bayern Munich	22	8	3	11	41	48	−7	27	
9	FFC Heike Rheine	22	5	5	12	39	56	−17	20	
10	FFC Brauweiler Pulheim (Note: Promoted from the 2. Bundesliga (women) last season)	22	3	4	15	24	79	−55	13	
11	VfL Sindelfingen	22	2	5	15	19	72	−53	11	Will be relegated to the 2. Bundesliga (women)
12	FSV Frankfurt (Note: FSV Frankfurt retired its women's section after the season.)	22	0	1	21	5	142	−137	1	Will be relegated to the 2. Bundesliga (women)

== Results ==
Home \ Away	POT	DUI	FRA	NEU	HSV	ESS	FRE	FCB	HRH	BRP	SIN	FSV
1. FFC Turbine Potsdam		2–1	2–0	7–1	1–1	5–1	4–0	3–1	5–1	13–0	3–0	16–0
FCR 2001 Duisburg	0–0		4–0	2–0	3–0	4–0	7–1	4–0	5–0	6–0	1–0	6–0
1. FFC Frankfurt	2–6	2–2		5–3	9–0	1–0	6–1	3–0	4–1	5–1	8–0	17–0
SC 07 Bad Neuenahr	2–1	1–9	0–4		3–0	5–0	4–0	3–1	3–1	2–2	4–1	5–0
Hamburger SV	1–3	0–3	0–3	2–1		3–3	5–0	0–0	2–2	2–0	3–0	3–1
SG Essen-Schönebeck	1–6	1–5	1–2	1–2	3–0		0–3	3–2	2–1	4–0	4–1	4–0
SC Freiburg	0–1	2–2	2–1	2–2	3–1	1–1		2–3	2–2	3–2	2–1	5–0
FC Bayern Munich	0–5	0–0	1–8	1–4	1–0	4–0	2–0		3–0	6–2	1–1	6–0
FFC Heike Rheine	0–7	1–4	0–2	0–3	0–2	2–3	3–3	2–2		2–2	5–0	7–0
FFC Brauweiler Pulheim	0–7	1–9	0–5	0–2	0–2	2–3	1–2	1–0	1–2		1–1	5–0
VfL Sindelfingen	1–5	0–10	1–3	1–3	0–3	1–1	0–6	0–5	2–1	1–1		1–1
FSV Frankfurt	0–13	0–4	0–7	0–8	0–9	0–7	0–5	0–3	1–2	1–3	1–6	

Legend: Blue = home team win; Yellow = draw; Red = away team win.

== Top scorers ==
Rank	Player	Team	Goals
1	(Germany) Conny Pohlers	FFC Frankufrt	36
2	(Germany) Inka Grings	FCR 2001 Duisburg	27
3	(Germany) Birgit Prinz	FFC Frankfurt	20
