= 2007–08 Frauen-Bundesliga =

Frauen-Bundesliga
- Season: 2007–08
- Champions: Frankfurt; 7th Bundesliga title 7th German title
- Relegated: Saarbrücken; Wattenscheid
- UEFA Cup: Frankfurt; Duisburg
- Matches: 132
- Goals: 505 (3.83 per match)
- Top goalscorer: (Germany) Inka Grings (26)
- Biggest home win: 9–1 Duisburg v Wolfsburg
- Biggest away win: 0–6 Freiburg v Bayern
- Highest scoring: 9–1 Duisburg v Wolfsburg

The 2007–08 Frauen-Bundesliga was the 18th season of the Frauen-Bundesliga, Germany's premier football league. It began on 19 August 2007 and ended on 15 June 2008.

Location of the 2007–08 Frauen-Bundesliga teams

== Final standings ==
| Pos | Team | Pld | W | D | L | GF | GA | GD | Pts | Qualification or relegation |
|---|---|---|---|---|---|---|---|---|---|---|
| 1 | 1. FFC Frankfurt (C) | 22 | 17 | 3 | 2 | 87 | 22 | +65 | 54 | 2007–08 Bundesliga (women) champions |
| 2 | FCR 2001 Duisburg | 22 | 17 | 2 | 3 | 65 | 20 | +45 | 53 | |
| 3 | 1. FFC Turbine Potsdam | 22 | 11 | 5 | 6 | 48 | 32 | +16 | 38 | |
| 4 | FC Bayern Munich | 22 | 12 | 2 | 8 | 53 | 38 | +15 | 38 | |
| 5 | SC 07 Bad Neuenahr | 22 | 12 | 1 | 9 | 43 | 33 | +10 | 37 | |
| 6 | VfL Wolfsburg | 22 | 10 | 4 | 8 | 42 | 48 | −6 | 34 | |
| 7 | SG Essen-Schönebeck | 22 | 9 | 6 | 7 | 43 | 40 | +3 | 33 | |
| 8 | SC Freiburg | 22 | 6 | 3 | 13 | 30 | 63 | −33 | 21 | |
| 9 | TSV Crailsheim | 22 | 5 | 4 | 13 | 28 | 43 | −15 | 19 | |
| 10 | Hamburger SV | 22 | 4 | 6 | 12 | 23 | 43 | −20 | 18 | |
| 11 | 1. FC Saarbrücken (Note: Promoted from the 2. Bundesliga (women) last season) | 22 | 4 | 6 | 12 | 26 | 51 | −25 | 18 | Will be relegated to the 2. Bundesliga (women) |
| 12 | SG Wattenscheid 09 | 22 | 3 | 2 | 17 | 17 | 69 | −52 | 11 | Will be relegated to the 2. Bundesliga (women) |

(C) Champions

== Results ==
| Home \ Away | FRA | DUI | POT | FCB | NEU | ESS | CRA | WOF | HSV | FRE | WAT | SAR |
|---|---|---|---|---|---|---|---|---|---|---|---|---|
| 1. FFC Frankfurt | | 4–0 | 4–0 | 5–2 | 0–1 | 5–1 | 3–1 | 6–0 | 6–1 | 8–0 | 4–0 | 2–1 |
| FCR 2001 Duisburg | 1–1 | | 0–1 | 2–1 | 1–0 | 1–4 | 7–1 | 9–1 | 4–0 | 8–1 | 3–0 | 3–0 |
| 1. FFC Turbine Potsdam | 2–1 | 1–2 | | 1–2 | 2–0 | 3–0 | 2–1 | 3–2 | 2–2 | 1–1 | 3–1 | 4–0 |
| FC Bayern Munich | 3–2 | 0–2 | 7–2 | | 2–0 | 3–3 | 3–2 | 1–3 | 0–0 | 2–4 | 6–1 | 4–1 |
| SC 07 Bad Neuenahr | 1–4 | 0–3 | 2–1 | 1–3 | | 4–0 | 2–1 | 3–0 | 2–4 | 4–3 | 7–0 | 5–1 |
| SG Essen-Schönebeck | 1–7 | 2–3 | 1–1 | 3–2 | 0–0 | | 2–0 | 0–1 | 1–1 | 1–2 | 6–0 | 3–0 |
| TSV Crailsheim | 1–2 | 0–2 | 1–0 | 0–1 | 0–2 | 2–4 | | 1–4 | 0–0 | 0–1 | 4–2 | 2–2 |
| VfL Wolfsburg | 1–1 | 2–2 | 2–5 | 3–1 | 4–1 | 1–1 | 1–1 | | 3–1 | 4–3 | 0–1 | 1–3 |
| Hamburger SV | 1–5 | 0–1 | 2–2 | 1–2 | 1–0 | 2–3 | 0–4 | 1–2 | | 3–1 | 1–0 | 1–1 |
| SC Freiburg | 2–6 | 0–3 | 1–6 | 0–6 | 1–4 | 0–3 | 0–1 | 0–2 | 3–0 | | 4–0 | 1–1 |
| SG Wattenscheid 09 | 1–7 | 1–3 | 0–5 | 2–1 | 1–2 | 0–2 | 1–3 | 2–4 | 1–0 | 0–0 | | 2–2 |
| 1. FC Saarbrücken | 2–4 | 0–5 | 0–2 | 0–1 | 1–2 | 2–2 | 2–2 | 2–1 | 3–1 | 0–2 | 2–1 | |

Legend: Blue = home team win; Yellow = draw; Red = away team win.

== Top scorers ==
| Rank | Player | Team | Goals |
|---|---|---|---|
| 1 | (Germany) Inka Grings | FCR 2001 Duisburg | 26 |
| 2 | (Germany) Birgit Prinz | FFC Frankfurt | 25 |
| 3 | (Germany) Conny Pohlers | FFC Frankfurt | 20 |
