= 2009–10 Frauen-Bundesliga =

Frauen-Bundesliga
- Season: 2009–10
- Champions: Turbine Potsdam
- Relegated: Tennis Borussia Berlin; SC Freiburg
- Matches: 132
- Goals: 511 (3.87 per match)
- Top goalscorer: Inka Grings (28)
- Biggest home win: 13–0 Frankfurt v Berlin
- Biggest away win: 0–6 Berlin v Potsdam, Saarbrücken v Duisburg, Jena v Duisburg
- Highest scoring: 13–0 Frankfurt v Berlin
- Longest winning run: Turbine Potsdam (13), Day 6–18
- Longest unbeaten run: Turbine Potsdam (18), Day 1–18
- Longest losing run: Tennis Borussia Berlin (12), Day 10–21
- Highest attendance: 4,320 FFC Frankfurt v Turbine Potsdam
- Lowest attendance: 67 Tennis Borussia Berlin v VfL Wolfsburg
- Average attendance: 766

The 2009–10 season of the Frauen-Bundesliga is the 20th season of Germany's premier women's football league. It started on 20 September 2009 and ended on 9 May 2010. On the 21st day of play Turbine Potsdam claimed the championship thus defending their title from the previous season. Tennis Borussia Berlin and SC Freiburg will be relegated to the second tier.

== Final standings ==
Pos	Team	Pld	W	D	L	GF	GA	GD	Pts	Qualification or relegation
1	Turbine Potsdam (C)	22	19	2	1	84	15	+69	59	2010–11 UEFA Champions League round of 32
2	FCR 2001 Duisburg	22	17	3	2	73	16	+57	54	2010–11 UEFA Champions League qualifying round
3	FFC Frankfurt	22	17	0	5	84	29	+55	51	
4	Bayern Munich	22	12	3	7	42	35	+7	39	
5	VfL Wolfsburg	22	11	4	7	45	30	+15	37	
6	SC 07 Bad Neuenahr	22	10	2	10	35	36	−1	32	
7	Hamburg	22	8	4	10	31	51	−20	28	
8	FF USV Jena	22	6	3	13	31	60	−29	21	
9	FC Saarbrücken	22	5	4	13	30	54	−24	19	
10	Essen-Schönebeck	22	3	7	12	25	58	−33	16	
11	SC Freiburg (R)	22	4	1	17	14	53	−39	13	Relegation to 2010–11 2. Bundesliga
12	Tennis Borussia Berlin (R)	22	2	3	17	17	74	−57	9	Relegation to 2010–11 2. Bundesliga

Rules for classification: 1) points; 2) goal difference; 3) number of goals scored.
(C) Champions; (R) Relegated

== Results ==
Home \ Away	NEU	TBB	DUI	ESS	FRA	FRE	HSV	JEN	FCB	POT	SAB	WOF
SC 07 Bad Neuenahr		2–1	1–3	1–2	1–5	3–0	0–0	6–2	3–0	0–4	2–1	1–0
Tennis Borussia Berlin	0–2		0–2	1–2	1–6	2–0	3–1	0–3	2–2	0–6	2–2	0–3
FCR 2001 Duisburg	4–1	4–1		2–0	0–2	5–0	4–0	3–0	7–0	2–2	1–1	4–0
Essen-Schönebeck	0–0	2–2	1–1		3–8	3–2	2–3	3–3	0–2	1–5	0–1	2–2
FFC Frankfurt	5–2	13–0	2–3	4–0		5–1	4–2	3–1	2–3	2–1	4–0	1–2
SC Freiburg	4–1	2–0	0–3	1–1	0–2		0–2	0–1	0–3	0–4	1–0	1–3
Hamburg	2–1	1–0	1–4	2–0	0–4	0–1		1–3	1–4	1–5	1–0	2–2
FF USV Jena	0–3	4–0	0–6	2–2	0–3	2–0	2–2		1–2	1–4	3–1	1–6
Bayern Munich	0–1	5–0	1–2	3–0	2–1	2–1	1–2	1–0		3–3	6–2	2–1
Turbine Potsdam	1–0	3–1	2–1	7–0	4–1	5–0	6–0	7–0	2–0		5–1	2–0
FC Saarbrücken	0–4	3–1	0–6	3–1	1–4	5–0	2–4	5–2	0–0	0–3		0–2
VfL Wolfsburg	2–0	3–0	1–3	3–0	2–3	1–0	3–3	2–0	4–0	1–3	2–2	

Legend: Blue = home team win; Yellow = draw; Red = away team win.

== Top scorers ==
Rank	Player	Team	Goals
1	(Germany) Inka Grings	Duisburg	28
2	(Germany) Kerstin Garefrekes	FFC Frankfurt	19
3	(Germany) Anja Mittag	Turbine Potsdam	17
4	(Germany) Fatmire Bajramaj	Turbine Potsdam	16
5	(Germany) Célia Okoyino da Mbabi	SC 07 Bad Neuenahr	15
5	(Germany) Conny Pohlers	FFC Frankfurt	15
