= German women's football clubs in international competitions =

This is a compilation of the results of the teams representing Germany at official international women's football competitions, that is the UEFA Women's Cup and its successor, the UEFA Women's Champions League.

Germany has been the most successful association in the competition with nine titles split between Frankfurt (4), Turbine Potsdam (2), Wolfsburg (2) and Duisburg (1) in nineteen editions as of the 2019–20 season, taking part in all finals but four. It is ranked second at the competition's association standings behind France, and it has held two spots since the 2009–10 season.

== Teams ==
These are the five teams that have represented Germany in the UEFA Women's Cup and the UEFA Women's Champions League.

Club	Founded	State	Location	Appearances	First	Last	Best result
Bayern Munich	1970	Bavaria	Munich	6	2009–10	2019–20	Semifinals (2018–19)
MSV Duisburg	1977	North Rhine-Westphalia	Duisburg	3	2008–09	2010–11	Champion (2008–09)
Eintracht Frankfurt	1973	Hesse	Frankfurt	10	2001–02	2015–16	Champion (2001–02, 2005–06, 2007–08, 2014–15)
Turbine Potsdam	1971	Brandenburg	Potsdam	8	2004–05	2013–14	Champion (2004–05, 2009–10)
Wolfsburg	1973	Lower Saxony	Wolfsburg	8	2012–13	2019–20	Champion (2012–13, 2013–14)

Location of the teams within Germany

== Qualification ==
Edition	Competition	First	Second	Third	Fourth	Fifth
2001–02 UWC	2000–01 Bundesliga	Frankfurt (54)	Turbine Potsdam (44)	Duisburg (40)	Brauweiler Pulheim (33)	Flaesheim-Hillen (34)
2002–03 UWC	2001–02 Bundesliga	Frankfurt (58)	Turbine Potsdam (44)	Duisburg (44)	Bayern Munich (40)	FSV Frankfurt (39)
2003–04 UWC	2002–03 Bundesliga	Frankfurt (57)	Turbine Potsdam (55)	Duisburg (44)	Heike Rheine (38)	Bayern Munich (37)
2004–05 UWC	2003–04 Bundesliga	Turbine Potsdam (61)	Frankfurt (57)	Heike Rheine (43)	Duisburg (35)	Bayern Munich (34)
2005–06 UWC	2004–05 Bundesliga	Frankfurt (63)	Duisburg (56)	Turbine Potsdam (49) ^{1}	Bayern Munich (33)	Bad Neuenahr (33)
2006–07 UWC	2005–06 Bundesliga	Turbine Potsdam (59)	Duisburg (55)	Frankfurt ^{1}	Bad Neuenahr (44)	Hamburger SV (33)
2007–08 UWC	2006–07 Bundesliga	Frankfurt (60)	Duisburg (51)	Turbine Potsdam (44)	Bayern Munich (38)	Bad Neuenahr (33)
2008–09 UWC	2007–08 Bundesliga	Frankfurt (54)	Duisburg (53)	Turbine Potsdam (38)	Bayern Munich (38)	Bad Neuenahr (37)
2009–10 UWCL	2008–09 Bundesliga	Turbine Potsdam (54)	Bayern Munich (54)	Duisburg (53) ^{1}	Frankfurt (45)	Essen-Schönebeck (30)
2010–11 UWCL	2009–10 Bundesliga	Turbine Potsdam (59)	Duisburg (54)	Frankfurt (51)	Bayern Munich (39)	Wolfsburg (37)
2011–12 UWCL	2010–11 Bundesliga	Turbine Potsdam (58)	Frankfurt (57)	Duisburg (51)	Hamburger SV (38)	Bayern Munich (35)
2012–13 UWCL	2011–12 Bundesliga	Turbine Potsdam (56)	Wolfsburg (53)	Frankfurt (46)	Duisburg (45)	Essen-Schönebeck (31)
2013–14 UWCL	2012–13 Bundesliga	Wolfsburg (53)	Turbine Potsdam (49)	Frankfurt (47)	Bayern Munich (43)	Freiburg (32)
2014–15 UWCL	2013–14 Bundesliga	Wolfsburg (55)	Frankfurt (53)	Turbine Potsdam (49)	Bayern Munich (39)	Jena (31)
2015–16 UWCL	2014–15 Bundesliga	Bayern Munich (56)	Wolfsburg (55)	Frankfurt (53) ^{1}	Turbine Potsdam (48)	Essen-Schönebeck (28)
2016–17 UWCL	2015–16 Bundesliga	Bayern Munich (57)	Wolfsburg (47)	Frankfurt (46)	Freiburg (32)	Essen-Schönebeck (32)
2017–18 UWCL	2016–17 Bundesliga	Wolfsburg (54)	Bayern Munich (52)	Turbine Potsdam (50)	Freiburg (45)	Frankfurt (37)
2017–18 UWCL	2017–18 Bundesliga	Wolfsburg (56)	Bayern Munich (53)	Freiburg (48)	Turbine Potsdam (45)	Essen-Schönebeck (39)
2019–20 UWCL	2018–19 Bundesliga	Wolfsburg (59)	Bayern Munich (55)	Turbine Potsdam (42)	Essen-Schönebeck (41)	Frankfurt (34)
2020–21 UWCL	2019–20 Bundesliga	Wolfsburg (62)	Bayern Munich (54)	1899 Hoffenheim (49)	Turbine Potsdam (37)	Essen-Schönebeck (35)

^{1} Didn't qualify through the national championship, but as defending champions.

== Historical progression ==
		2001–02	2002–03	2003–04	2004–05	2005–06	2006–07	2007–08	2008–09	2009–10
Champion		FRA			TUR	FRA		FRA	DUI	TUR
Finalists		FRA		FRA	TUR	FRA - TUR		FRA	DUI	TUR
Semifinalists		FRA	FRA	FRA	TUR	FRA - TUR		FRA	DUI	TUR - DUI
Quarterfinalists		FRA	FRA	FRA	TUR	FRA - TUR	FRA - TUR	FRA	DUI - FRA	TUR - DUI
Round of 16		Not played	Not played	Not played	TUR	FRA - TUR	FRA - TUR	FRA	DUI - FRA	TUR - DUI - BAY
Round of 32		FRA	FRA	FRA						TUR - DUI - BAY
Earlier stages										BAY
	2010–11	2011–12	2012–13	2013–14	2014–15	2015–16	2016–17	2017–18	2018–19	2019–20
Champion			WOL	WOL	FRA					
Finalists	TUR	FRA	WOL	WOL	FRA	WOL		WOL		WOL
Semifinalists	TUR - DUI	FRA - TUR	WOL	WOL - TUR	FRA - WOL	WOL - FRA		WOL	BAY	WOL
Quarterfinalists	TUR - DUI	FRA - TUR	WOL	WOL - TUR	FRA - WOL	WOL - FRA		WOL	BAY - WOL	BAY - WOL
Round of 16	TUR - DUI	FRA - TUR	WOL - TUR	WOL - TUR	FRA - WOL	WOL - FRA	BAY - WOL	WOL	BAY - WOL	BAY - WOL
Round of 32	TUR - DUI	FRA - TUR	WOL - TUR	WOL - TUR	FRA - WOL	WOL - FRA - BAY	BAY - WOL	BAY - WOL	BAY - WOL	BAY - WOL
Earlier stages	DUI									

== Results by team ==
=== Bayern Munich ===
2009–10 UEFA Women's Champions League
Round	Opponent	1st	2nd	Agg.	Scorers
Qualifiers (group stage)	(Scotland) Glasgow City	5–2			Simic 2 - Aigner - Banecki - Würmseer
Qualifiers (group stage)	(Georgia (country)) Norchi Dinamoeli	19–0			Bürki 6 - Würmseer 5 - Simic 4 - Behringer 2 - Rech
Qualifiers (group stage)	(Lithuania) Gintra Universitetas (host)	8–0		9 points	Bürki 4 - de Pol - Mirlach - Simic - Würmseer
Round of 32	(Hungary) Viktória Szombathely	a: 5–0	h: 4–2	9–2	Mayr 4 - Banecki - Baunach - Bürki - Islacker - de Pol
Round of 16	(France) Montpellier	a: 0–0	h: 0–1 (aet)	0–1	

2015–16 UEFA Women's Champions League
Round	Opponent	1st	2nd	Agg.	Scorers
Round of 32	(Netherlands) Twente	a: 1–1	h: 2–2	3–3 (agr)	Behringer - Leupolz

2016–17 UEFA Women's Champions League
Round	Opponent	1st	2nd	Agg.	Scorers
Last 32	(Scotland) Hibernian	a: 6–0	h: 4–1	10–1	Miedema 3 - Gerhardt 2 - Leupolz 2 - Behringer - Evans - van der Gragt
Last 16	(Russia) Rossiyanka	h: 4–0	a: 4–0	8–0	Miedema 4 - Däbritz - Evans - Holstad Berge - Rolser
Quarterfinals	(France) Paris Saint-Germain	h: 1–0	a: 0–4	1–4	Miedema

2017–18 UEFA Women's Champions League
Round	Opponent	1st	2nd	Agg.	Scorers
Round of 32	(England) Chelsea	a: 0–1	h: 2–1	2–2 (agr)	Voňková

2018–19 UEFA Women's Champions League
Round	Opponent	1st	2nd	Agg.	Scorers
Round of 32	(Serbia) Spartak Subotica	a: 7–0	h: 4–0	11–0	Beerensteyn 3 - Magull 2 - Roord 2 - Damnjanović - Demann - Islacker - Lewandowski
Round of 16	(Switzerland) Zürich	a: 2–0	h: 3–0	5–0	Škorvánková 2 - Däbritz - Roord
Quarterfinals	(Czech Republic) Slavia Praha	a: 1–1	h: 5–1	6–2	Islacker 2 - Rolfö 2 - Leupolz - Roord
Semifinals	(Spain) Barcelona	h: 0–1	a: 0–1	0–2	

2019–20 UEFA Women's Champions League
Round	Opponent	1st	2nd	Agg.	Scorers
Round of 32	(Sweden) Kopparbergs/Göteborg	a: 2–1	h: 0–1	2–2 (agr)	Islacker 2
Round of 16	(Kazakhstan) BIIK Kazygurt	a: 5–0	h: 2–0	7–0	Magull 2 - Wenninger 2 - Damnjanović - Gielnik - Rolser
Quarterfinal	(France) Lyon			1–2	Simon

=== Duisburg ===
2008–09 UEFA Women's Cup
Round	Opponent	1st	2nd	Agg.	Scorers
Last 16 (group stage)	(Ukraine) Naftokhimik Kalush (host)	5–1			Grings 2 - Laudehr 2 - Kayikçi
Last 16 (group stage)	(Spain) Levante	5–0			Grings 2 - Laudehr 2 - Hartmann
Last 16 (group stage)	(Denmark) Brøndby	4–1		9 points	Grings - Fuss
Quarterfinals	(Germany) Frankfurt	a: 3–1	h: 2–0	5–1	Bresonik 2 - Grings 2
Semifinals	(France) Olympique Lyonnais	a: 1–1	h: 3–1	4–2	Grings 2 - Bresonik - Maes
Final	(Russia) Zvezda Perm	a: 6–0	h: 1–1	7–1	Grings 3 - Maes 2 - Alushi - Krahn

2009–10 UEFA Women's Champions League
Round	Opponent	1st	2nd	Agg.	Scorers
Last 32	(Belarus) Universitet Vitebsk	a: 5–1	h: 6–3	11–4	Grings 7 - Maes 2 - Hegering - Leite
Last 16	(Sweden) Linköping	h: 1–1	a: 2–0	3–1	Grings - Laudehr - Popp
Quarterfinals	(England) Arsenal	h: 2–1	a: 2–0	4–1	Grings - Hegering - Himmighofen - Oster
Semifinals	(Germany) Turbine Potsdam	h: 1–0	a: 0–1	1–1 (p: 1–3)	Maes

2010–11 UEFA Women's Champions League
Round	Opponent	1st	2nd	Agg.	Scorers
Qualifiers (group stage)	(Slovakia) Slovan Bratislava	3–0			Laudehr - Oster - Popp
Qualifiers (group stage)	(Northern Ireland) Crusaders N.S. (host)	6–1			Kiesel 2 - Wensing 2 - Krahn - Roelvink
Qualifiers (group stage)	(Scotland) Glasgow City	4–0		9 points	Grings 2 - Kiesel - Laudehr
Round of 32	(Kazakhstan) SShVSM-Kairat	a: 5–0	h: 6–0	11–0	Grings 8 - Laudehr 2 - Müller
Round of 16	(Denmark) Fortuna Hjørring	h: 4–2	a: 3–0	7–2	Islacker 2 - Weichelt 2 - Grings - Knaak - Wensing
Quarterfinals	(England) Everton	a: 3–1	h: 2–1	5–2	Popp 2 - Ando - Grings - Laudehr
Semifinals	(Germany) Turbine Potsdam	h: 2–2	a: 0–1	2–3	Grings - Oster

=== Frankfurt ===
2001–02 UEFA Women's Cup
Round	Opponent	1st	2nd	Agg.	Scorers
Last 32 (group stage)	(Spain) Levante	1–0			Wunderlich
Last 32 (group stage)	(Moldova) Codru Chişinău	5–0			Hansen - Künzer - Lingor - Meier - Minnert
Last 32 (group stage)	(Armenia) Yerevan	18–0		9 points	Jones 6 - Klein 3 - Meier 3 - Haase 2 - Hansen - Künzer - Spee - Wissink
Quarterfinals	(Denmark) Odense	a: 3–0	h: 2–1	5–1	Lingor 2 - Jones - Prinz - Wunderlich
Semifinals	(France) Toulouse	a: 2–1	h: 0–0	2–1	Jones - Meier
Final	(Sweden) Umeå	2–0		2–0	Jones - Prinz

2002–03 UEFA Women's Cup
Round	Opponent	1st	2nd	Agg.	Scorers
Last 32 (group stage)	(Serbia and Montenegro) Mašinac Niš (host)	2–0			Meier - Wunderlich
Last 32 (group stage)	(Croatia) Osijek	8–0			Prinz 3 - Meier 2 - Barucha - Jones - Wunderlich
Last 32 (group stage)	(Republic of Ireland) Shamrock Rovers	7–1		9 points	Jones 2 - Barucha - Lingor - Meier - Woock - Wunderlich
Quarterfinals	(Finland) HJK	a: 2–0	h: 8–0	10–1	Prinz 3 - Woock 2 - Affeld - Jones - Kliehm - Lingor - Wunderlich
Semifinals	(Sweden) Umeå	a: 1–1	h: 1–1 (aet)	2–2 (p: 6-7)	Lingor - Wunderlich

2003–04 UEFA Women's Cup
Round	Opponent	1st	2nd	Agg.	Scorers
Last 32 (group stage)	(Portugal) 1º Dezembro	4–0			Albertz - Barucha - Lingor
Last 32 (group stage)	(Austria) Neulengbach	7–1			Albertz 2 - Affeld - Grant - Kliehm - Lingor - Rastetter
Last 32 (group stage)	(Spain) Athletic Bilbao (host)	8–1		9 points	Barucha 2 - Lingor 2 - Albertz - Hansen - Grant - Künzer
Quarterfinals	(England) Fulham	h: 3–1	a: 4–1	7–2	Barucha 2 - Prinz 2 - Albertz - Kliehm - Wunderlich
Semifinals	(Sweden) Malmö	a: 0–0	h: 4–1	4–1	Lingor 3
Final	(Sweden) Umeå	a: 0–3	h: 0–5	0–8	

2005–06 UEFA Women's Cup
Round	Opponent	1st	2nd	Agg.	Scorers
Last 16 (group stage)	(Switzerland) LUwin.ch (host)	4–0			Garefrekes - Härtel - Lingor - Prinz
Last 16 (group stage)	(Czech Republic) Sparta Prague	1–1			Smisek
Last 16 (group stage)	(Azerbaijan) Gömrükçü Baku	11–1		9 points	Wunderlich 4 - Prinz 3 - Garefrekes 2 - Härtel - Kliehm
Quarterfinals	(England) Arsenal	a: 1–1	h: 3–1	4–2	Smisek 2 - Garefrekes - Lingor
Semifinals	(France) Montpellier	h: 0–1	a: 3–2	3–3 (agr)	Smisek 2 - Lingor
Final	(Germany) Turbine Potsdam	a: 4–0	h: 3–2	7–2	Lingor 3 - Albertz - Garefrekes - Jones - Prinz

2006–07 UEFA Women's Cup
Round	Opponent	1st	2nd	Agg.	Scorers
Last 16 (group stage)	(Belarus) Universitet Vitebsk	5–0			Bartusiak - Hansen - Lingor - Prinz - Smisek
Last 16 (group stage)	(Iceland) Breiðablik	5–0			Garefrekes 2 - Lingor 2 - Wimbersky
Last 16 (group stage)	(Finland) HJK (host)	2–0		9 points	Affeld - Garefrekes
Quarterfinals	(Norway) Kolbotn	a: 1–2	h: 3–2	4–4 (agr)	Smisek 3 - Wimbersky

2007–08 UEFA Women's Cup
Round	Opponent	1st	2nd	Agg.	Scorers
Last 16 (group stage)	(Iceland) Valur	3–1			Wimbersky 2 - Prinz
Last 16 (group stage)	(England) Everton	2–1			Pohlers - Prinz
Last 16 (group stage)	(Belgium) Rapide Wezemaal (host)	1–1		7 points	
Quarterfinals	(Russia) Rossiyanka	a: 0–0	h: 2–1	2-1	Prinz - Wimbersky
Semifinals	(Italy) Bardolino	h: 4–2	a: 3–0	7–2	Pohlers 3 - Prinz 2 - Garefrekes - Thomas
Final	(Sweden) Umeå	a: 1–1	h: 3–2	4–3	Pohlers 3 - Wimbersky

2008–09 UEFA Women's Cup
Round	Opponent	1st	2nd	Agg.	Scorers
Last 16 (group stage)	(Russia) Zvezda Perm	0–1			
Last 16 (group stage)	(Norway) Røa (host)	3–1			Schatton 2
Last 16 (group stage)	(Scotland) Glasgow City	3–1		6 points	Thomas 2 - Schatton
Quarterfinals	(Germany) Duisburg	h: 1–3	a: 0–2	1–5	Prinz

2011–12 UEFA Women's Champions League
Round	Opponent	1st	2nd	Agg.	Scorers
Last 32	(Norway) Stabæk	a: 0–1	h: 4–1	4–2	Bartusiak - Crnogorčević - Landström - Smisek
Last 16	(France) Paris Saint-Germain	h: 3–0	a: 1–2	4–2	Alushi - Behringer - Crnogorčević - Garefrekes
Quarterfinals	(Sweden) Malmö	a: 0–1	h: 3–0	3–1	Garefrekes 2 - Chojnowski
Semifinals	(England) Arsenal	a: 2–1	h: 2–0	4–1	Crnogorčević - Garefrekes - Landström - Marozsán
Final	(France) Olympique Lyonnais	0–2		0–2	

2014–15 UEFA Women's Champions League
Round	Opponent	1st	2nd	Agg.	Scorers
Last 32	(Kazakhstan) Kazygurt	a: 2–2	h: 4–0	6–2	Šašić 2 - Marozsán 2 - Boquete - Garefrekes
Last 16	(Italy) Torres	h: 5–0	a: 4–0	9–0	Šašić 4 - Boquete - Garefrekes - Laudehr - Marozsán
Quarterfinals	(England) Bristol Academy	a: 5–0	h: 7–0	12–0	Islacker 4 - Marozsán 2 - Ando - Boquete - Garefrekes - Löber - B. Schmidt - Störzel
Semifinals	(Denmark) Brøndby	h: 7–0	a: 6–0	13–0	Šašić 7 - Boquete 3 - Laudehr - Marozsán
Final	(France) Paris Saint-Germain	2–1		2–1	Islacker - Šašić

2015–16 UEFA Women's Champions League
Round	Opponent	1st	2nd	Agg.	Scorers
Last 32	(Belgium) Standard Liège	a: 2–0	h: 6–0	8–0	Garefrekes 2 - Bartusiak - Crnogorčević - Islacker - Linden - Nagasato - S. Schmidt
Last 16	(Norway) Lillestrøm	a: 2–0	h: 0–2 (aet)	2–2 (p: 5–4)	Garefrekes - Islacker
Quarterfinals	(Sweden) Rosengård	a: 1–0	h: 0–1 (aet)	1–1 (p: 5–4)	Marozsán
Semifinals	(Germany) Wolfsburg	a: 0–4	h: 1–0	1–4	Prießen

=== Turbine Potsdam ===
2004–05 UEFA Women's Cup
Round	Opponent	1st	2nd	Agg.	Scorers
Last 16 (group stage)	(France) Montpellier	6–0			Pohlers 3 - Mittag - Odebrecht - Omilade
Last 16 (group stage)	(Poland) Wroclaw	4–1			Pohlers 2 - Odebrecht - Zietz
Last 16 (group stage)	(Italy) Torres	7–5		9 points	Pohlers 3 - Wimbersky 2 - Hingst - Omilade
Quarterfinals	(Russia) Energiya Voronezh	a: 1–1	h: 4–1	5–2	Wimbersky 2 - Becher - Mittag - Odebrecht
Semifinals	(Norway) Trondheims-Ørn	h: 4–0	a: 3–1	7–1	Pohlers 3 - Hingst 2 - Mittag - Wimbersky
Final	(Sweden) Djurgårdens/Äljsvö	a: 2–0	h: 3–1	5–1	Pohlers 3 - Mittag - Wimbersky

2005–06 UEFA Women's Cup
Round	Opponent	1st	2nd	Agg.	Scorers
Last 16 (group stage)	(Austria) Neulengbach	12–1			Wimbersky 4 - Mittag 3 - Carlson - Hingst - I. Kerschowski - Omilade - Thomas
Last 16 (group stage)	(Netherlands) Saestum	2–0			Hingst - Wimbersky
Last 16 (group stage)	(France) Montpellier (host)	0–0		7 points	
Quarterfinals	(Iceland) Valur	a: 8–1	h: 11–1	19–2	Mittag 4 - Pohlers 4 - Cristiane 3 - Wimbersky 3 - I. Kerschowski - Omilade - Thomas
Semifinals	(Sweden) Djurgården	h: 2–3	a: 5–2	7–5	Mittag 2 - Pohlers 2 - Cristiane - Podvorica - Zietz
Final	(Germany) Frankfurt	h: 0–4	a: 2–3	2–7	Pohlers 2

2006–07 UEFA Women's Cup
Round	Opponent	1st	2nd	Agg.	Scorers
Last 16 (group stage)	(Belgium) Rapide Wezemaal	1–0			Pohlers
Last 16 (group stage)	(Netherlands) Saestum (host)	2–2			Pohlers 2
Last 16 (group stage)	(Czech Republic) Sparta Prague	4–0		7 points	Hingst - Kameraj - I. Kerschowski - Pohlers
Quarterfinals	(Denmark) Brøndby	a: 0–3	h: 2–1	2–4	Carlson - Hingst

2009–10 UEFA Women's Champions League
Round	Opponent	1st	2nd	Agg.	Scorers
Last 32	(Finland) Honka	a: 8–1	h: 8–0	16–1	Mittag 6 - Alushi 2 - Zietz 2 - Bagehorn - Draws - Keßler - Odebrecht
Last 16	(Denmark) Brøndby	h: 1–0	a: 4–0	5–0	Keßler 2 - Alushi - Mittag - Wich
Quarterfinals	(Norway) Røa	h: 5–0	a: 5–0	10–0	Keßler 2 - Mittag 2 - Y. Nagasato 2 - Alushi - Odebrecht - Peter - Wich
Semifinals	(Germany) Duisburg	a: 0–1	h: 1–0 (aet)	1–1 (p: 3–1)	Kemme
Final	(France) Olympique Lyonnais	0–0 (aet)		0–0 (p: 7–6)	

2010–11 UEFA Women's Champions League
Round	Opponent	1st	2nd	Agg.	Scorers
Last 32	(Finland) Åland United	a: 9–0	h: 6–0	15–0	Mittag 4 - Alushi 2 - Peter 2 - Schmidt 2 - Demann - Kemme - Keßler - Y. Nagasato - Wesely
Last 16	(Austria) Neulengbach	h: 7–0	a: 9–0	16–0	Y. Nagasato 4 - Mittag 3 - Zietz 3 - Alushi 2 - Bagehorn - Keßler - Odebrecht - Wesely
Quarterfinals	(France) Juvisy	a: 3–0	h: 6–2	9–2	I. Kerschowski 2 - Y. Nagasato 2 - Schmidt 2 - Alushi - Mittag
Semifinals	(Germany) Duisburg	a: 2–2	h: 1–0	3–2	Y. Nagasato 2 - I. Kerschowski
Final	(France) Olympique Lyonnais	0–2		0–2	

2011–12 UEFA Women's Champions League
Round	Opponent	1st	2nd	Agg.	Scorers
Last 32	(Iceland) Þór/KA	a: 6–0	h: 8–2	14–2	Y. Nagasato 3 - Kerschowski 2 - Mittag 2 - Añonma - Göransson - Hanebeck - Peter - Zietz
Last 16	(Scotland) Glasgow City	h: 10–0	a: 7–0	17–0	Mittag 5 - de Ridder 3 - Añonma 2 - Y. Nagasato 2 - Demann - Draws - Kerschowski - Schmidt
Quarterfinals	(Russia) Rossiyanka	h: 2–0	a: 3–0	5–0	Y. Nagasato 2 - Hanebeck - Peter
Semifinals	(France) Olympique Lyonnais	a: 1–5	h: 0–0	1–5	Schmidt

2012–13 UEFA Women's Champions League
Round	Opponent	1st	2nd	Agg.	Scorers
Last 32	(Belgium) Standard Liège	a: 3–1	h: 5–0	8–1	Andonova 5 - Añonma - Y. Nagasato
Last 16	(England) Arsenal	a: 1–2	h: 3–4	4–6	Göransson 2 - Y. Nagasato - Winters

2013–14 UEFA Women's Champions League
Round	Opponent	1st	2nd	Agg.	Scorers
Last 32	(Hungary) MTK	a: 5–0	h: 6–0	11–0	Andonova 3 - Evans 2 - Göransson 2 - A. Nagasato 2 - Draws - Mjelde
Last 16	(France) Olympique Lyonnais	h: 0–1	a: 2–1	2–2 (agr)	Draws - Mjelde
Quarterfinals	(Italy) Torres	a: 8–0	h: 4–1	12–1	Ad. Hegerberg 2 - Simic 2 - Wälti 2 - Añonma - Bremer - Elsig - Evans - A. Nagasato
Semifinals	(Germany) Wolfsburg	h: 0–0	a: 2–4	2–4	Añonma - Simic

=== Wolfsburg ===
2012–13 UEFA Women's Champions League
Round	Opponent	1st	2nd	Agg.	Scorers
Last 32	(Poland) Unia Racibórz	a: 5–1	h: 6–1	11–2	Pohlers 4 - Keßler 2 - Müller 2 - Faißt - Jakabfi - Odebrecht
Last 16	(Norway) Røa	h: 4–1	a: 1–1	5–2	Pohlers 2 - Jakabfi - Popp
Quarterfinals	(Russia) Rossiyanka	g: 2–1	a: 2–0	4–1	Goeßling - Müller - Pohlers - Popp
Semifinals	(England) Arsenal	a: 2–0	h: 2–1	4–1	Keßler - Müller - Pohlers - Wagner
Final	(France) Olympique Lyonnais	1–0		1–0	Müller

2013–14 UEFA Women's Champions League
Round	Opponent	1st	2nd	Agg.	Scorers
Last 32	(Estonia) Pärnu	a: 14–0	h: 13–0	27–0	Pohlers 6 - Magull 4 - Meyer 3 - Müller 3 - Damnjanović 2 - Fischer 2 - Keßler 2 - Blässe - Bunte - Jakabfi - Odebrecht - Popp
Last 16	(Sweden) Malmö	a: 2–1	h: 3–1	5–2	Müller 2 - Goeßling - Popp - Wensing
Quarterfinals	(Spain) Barcelona	h: 3–0	a: 2–0	5–0	Keßler 2 - Müller 2 - Jakabfi
Semifinals	(Germany) Turbine Potsdam	a: 0–0	h: 4–2	4–2	Popp 2 - Keßler - Müller
Final	(Sweden) Tyresö	4–3		4–3	Müller 2 - Faißt - Popp

2014–15 UEFA Women's Champions League
Round	Opponent	1st	2nd	Agg.	Scorers
Last 32	(Norway) Stabæk	a: 1–0	h: 2–1	3–1	Hansen 2 - Fischer
Last 16	(Austria) Neulengbach	a: 4–0	h: 7–0	11–0	Magull 2 - Müller 2 - Popp 2 - Wagner 2 - Bernauer - Fischer
Quarterfinals	(Sweden) Rosengård	h: 1–1	a: 3–3	4–4 (agr)	Popp - Faißt - Peter
Semifinals	(France) Paris Saint-Germain	h: 0–2	a: 2–1	2–3	Jakabfi - Müller

2015–16 UEFA Women's Champions League
Round	Opponent	1st	2nd	Agg.	Scorers
Last 32	(Serbia) Spartak Subotica	a: 0–0	h: 4–0	4–0	Dickenmann - Faißt - Hansen - Simic
Last 16	(England) Chelsea	a: 2–1	h: 2–0	4–1	Bernauer - Hansen
Quarterfinals	(Italy) Brescia	h: 3–0	a: 3–0	6–0	Jakabfi 2 - Bachmann - Hansen - Popp - Wullaert
Semifinals	(Germany) Frankfurt	h: 4–0	a: 0–1	4–1	Bachmann - Kerschowski - Peter - Popp
Final	(France) Olympique Lyonnais	1–1 (aet)		1–1 (p: 3–4)	Popp

2016–17 UEFA Women's Champions League
Round	Opponent	1st	2nd	Agg.	Scorers
Last 32	(England) Chelsea	a: 3–0	h: 1–1	4–1	Jakabfi 3 - Gunnarsdóttir
Last 16	(Sweden) Eskilstuna United	a: 5–1	h: 3–0	8–1	Jakabfi 5 - Bernauer - Dickenmann - Popp
Quarterfinals	(France) Olympique Lyonnais	h: 0–2	a: 1–0	1–2	Hansen

2017–18 UEFA Women's Champions League
Round	Opponent	1st	2nd	Agg.	Scorers
Round of 32	(Spain) Atlético Madrid	a: 3–0	h: 12–2	15–2	Harder 3 - Popp 3 - Dickenmann 2 - Wullaert 2 - Gunnarsdóttir - Hansen - Pajor
Round of 16	(Italy) Fiorentina	a: 4–0	h: 3–3	7–3	Gunnarsdóttir 3 - Wullaert 2 - Harder - Popp
Quarterfinals	(Czech Republic) Slavia Praha	h: 5–0	a: 1–1	6–1	Harder 2 - Pajor 2 - Graham Hansen - Gunnarsdóttir
Semifinals	(England) Chelsea	a: 3–1	h: 2–0	5–1	Gunnarsdóttir - Dickenmann - Harder - Pajor
Final	(France) Olympique Lyonnais	1–4 (aet)		1–4 (aet)	Harder

2018–19 UEFA Women's Champions League
Round	Opponent	1st	2nd	Agg.	Scorers
Round of 32	(Iceland) Þór/KA	a: 1–0	h: 2–0	3–0	Harder 2 - Masar
Round of 16	(Spain) Atlético Madrid	h: 4–0	a: 6–0	10–0	Harder 4 - Pajor 2 - Graham Hansen 2 - Popp - Minde
Quarterfinals	(France) Olympique Lyonnais	a: 1–2	h: 2–4	3–6	Harder 2 - Fischer

2019–20 UEFA Women's Champions League
Round	Opponent	1st	2nd	Agg.	Scorers
Round of 32	(Kosovo) Mitrovica	a: 10–0	h: 5–0	15–0	Harder 4 - Maritz 2 - Neto 2 - Jakabfi 2 - Rauch - Huth - Minde - Wolter - Gunnarsdóttir
Round of 16	(Netherlands) Twente	h: 6–0	a: 1–0	7–0	Jakabfi 2 - Bloodworth 2 - Harder - Rolfö - Blässe
Quarterfinals	(Scotland) Glasgow City	9–1		9–1	Harder 4 - Engen 2 - Rauch
Semifinals	(Spain) Barcelona	1–0		1–0	Rolfö
Final	(France) Olympique Lyonnais	1–3		1–3	Popp
