= List of Turbine Potsdam seasons =

This is a list of seasons played by German women's football club 1. FFC Turbine Potsdam in German and European football, from the creation of the East German women's football championship in 1979 to the last completed season. Turbine competed in East German football between 1979 and 1991 and in all-German competitions from the 1991–92 season onwards.

== Summary ==
Champions	Runners-up	Promoted	Relegated

Domestic and international results of Turbine Potsdam
Season	League										Cup	Europe		League top scorers					
Season	Tier	Division	Pos	P	W	D	L	F	A	Pts	Cup	Europe		1st	Goal	2nd	Goal	3rd	Goal
1980–81	1	DDR-Meisterschaft	1	4	4	0	0	12	2	8									
1981–82	1	DDR-Meisterschaft	1	4	4	0	0	11	0	8									
1982–83	1	DDR-Meisterschaft	1	4	3	1	0	7	0	7									
1983–84	1	DDR-Meisterschaft	2	4	1	3	0	4	1	5									
1984–85	1	DDR-Meisterschaft	W																
1985–86	1	DDR-Meisterschaft	W																
1986–87	1	DDR-Meisterschaft	RU																
1987–88	1	DDR-Meisterschaft	RU																
1988–89	1	DDR-Meisterschaft	W																
1989–90	1	DDR-Oberliga	2					53	5	28									
1990–91	1	DDR-Oberliga	3					59	24	28	RU								
1991–92	2	Regionalliga (Northeast Group)	1	20	16	1	3	62	14	33									
1992–93	2	Regionalliga (Northeast Group)	4	22	12	6	4	49	20	30	QS								
1993–94	2	Regionalliga (Northeast Group)	1	22	19	2	1	99	15	40	R32								
1994–95	1	Bundesliga (North Group)	6	18	6	2	10	25	60	14	R16								
1995–96	1	Bundesliga (North Group)	6	18	5	6	7	29	41	21	R32								
1996–97	1	Bundesliga (North Group)	5	18	8	3	7	32	29	27	SF								
1997–98	1	Bundesliga	6	22	9	3	10	34	43	30	R16			(Germany) Walther	7				
1998–99	1	Bundesliga	4	22	7	8	7	41	39	29	SF			(Germany) Pohlers	9				
1999–00	1	Bundesliga	4	22	13	2	7	43	27	41	QF			(Germany) Pohlers	17				
2000–01	1	Bundesliga	2	22	13	5	4	63	17	44	SF			(Germany) Pohlers	23				
2001–02	1	Bundesliga	2	22	14	2	6	56	23	44	SF			(Germany) Pohlers	27				
2002–03	1	Bundesliga	2	22	17	4	1	64	15	55	R32			(Germany) Pohlers	13				
2003–04	1	Bundesliga	1	22	20	1	1	96	17	61	W			(Germany) Pohlers	18				
2004–05	1	Bundesliga	3	22	16	1	5	79	29	59	W	UEFA Women's Cup	W	(Germany) Mittag	17	(Germany) Pohlers ^{N}	17	(Germany) Wimbersky	13
2005–06	1	Bundesliga	1	22	19	2	1	115	13	59	W	UEFA Women's Cup	RU	(Germany) Pohlers	36	(Germany) Wimbersky	19	(Germany) Mittag	15
2006–07	1	Bundesliga	3	22	13	5	4	51	23	44	R32	UEFA Women's Cup	QF	(Germany) Pohlers	8	(Germany) Schmidt ^{N}	8	(Germany) Mittag	7
2007–08	1	Bundesliga	3	22	11	5	6	45	32	38	QF			(Germany) Wich	12	(Germany) Mittag	10	(Germany) Zietz	8
2008–09	1	Bundesliga	1	22	19	2	1	84	15	59	RU			(Germany) Mittag	21	(Germany) Zietz	9	(Germany) Kerschowski	6
2009–10	1	Bundesliga	1	22	17	3	2	67	19	54	SF	Champions League	W	(Germany) Mittag	17	(Germany) Bajramaj	16	(Germany) Keßler	11
2010–11	1	Bundesliga	1	22	19	1	2	67	17	58	RU	Champions League	RU	(Germany) Mittag	15	(Germany) Bajramaj	13	(Japan) Y. Nagasato	10
2011–12	1	Bundesliga	1	22	18	2	2	63	10	56	QF	Champions League	SF	(Equatorial Guinea) Añonma	22	(Japan) Y. Nagasato	12	(Sweden) Göransson^{N}	5
2012–13	1	Bundesliga	2	22	16	1	5	70	16	49	RU	Champions League	R16	(Japan) Y. Nagasato	18	(Equatorial Guinea) Añonma	18	(Sweden) Göransson	12
2013–14	1	Bundesliga	3	22	15	4	3	64	20	49	R32	Champions League	SF	(Equatorial Guinea) Añonma	16	(Germany) Simic	9	(Germany) Bremer^{N}	7
2014–15	1	Bundesliga	4	22	15	3	4	52	24	48	RU			(Equatorial Guinea) Añonma	10	(Japan) A. Nagasato	6	(Germany) Wesely^{N}	6
2015–16	1	Bundesliga	7	22	9	3	10	42	28	30	QF			(Germany) Huth	13	(Germany) Schwalm	6	(Germany) Lindner	4
2016–17	1	Bundesliga	3	22	16	2	4	42	16	50	R32			(Germany) Kemme	10	(Germany) Rauch^{N}	7	(Germany) Huth	7
2017–18	1	Bundesliga	4	22	13	6	3	50	21	45	SF			(Germany) Huth	8	(Switzerland) Kiwic	6	(Germany) Kemme^{N}	5
2018–19	1	Bundesliga	3	22	12	6	4	59	25	42	QF			(Slovenia) Prašnikar	9	(Germany) Schwalm	8	(Germany) Huth	7
2019–20	1	Bundesliga	4	22	12	1	19	52	45	37	QF			(Slovenia) Prašnikar	15	(Germany) Ehegötz	6	(Poland) Mesjasz	5
2020–21	1	Bundesliga	4	22	12	3	7	41	36	39	QF			(Germany) Cerci	8	(Germany) Orschmann	7	(Germany) Kössler	4
2021–22	1	Bundesliga	4	22	13	4	5	52	29	43	RU			(Germany) Cerci	13	(Germany) Kössler	10	(Germany) Weidauer	6
2022–23	1	Bundesliga	12	22	2	2	18	13	68	8	R16			(Canada) De Filippo	2	(Poland) Wiankowska	2	four players	1
