= 2003–04 DFB-Pokal Frauen =

Tournament details
- Country: Germany
- Teams: 32

Final positions
- Champions: Turbine Potsdam
- Runners-up: FFC Frankfurt

Tournament statistics
- Matches played: 31

The Frauen DFB-Pokal 2003–04 was the 24th season of the cup competition, Germany's second-most important title in women's football. The first round of the competition was held on 6–7 September 2003. In the final which was held in Berlin on 29 May 2004, Turbine Potsdam defeated FFC Frankfurt 3–0 to claim their first title.

== First round ==
Heike Rheine's 20–0 victory against FC Oberneuland was the most lopsided result in the Frauen DFB-Pokal ever, tied with an FFC Frankfurt victory from the 2001–02 season.

6 September 2003
TuS Niederkichen II	4 – 1	TuS Ahrbach
Viktoria Jägersburg	1 – 3	FSV Frankfurt
7 September 2003
FSV 02 Schwerin	0 – 10	FCR 2001 Duisburg
TuS Niederkirchen	2 – 4	Bayern Munich
Bayern Munich II	1 – 3	1. FC Saarbrücken
Karlsruher SC	3 – 5	FF USV Jena	(aet)
TSV Schilksee	0 – 6	Brauweiler Pulheim
Tennis Borussia Berlin	0 – 1	Hamburg
SpVgg Oberaußem-Fortuna	0 – 4	VfL Wolfsburg
Alemannia Altdöbern	0 – 14	Turbine Potsdam
1. FFC Recklinghausen 2003	1 – 7	Victoria Gersten
Hertha Zehlendorf	0 – 3	Magdeburger FFC
SC Freiburg II	0 – 2	Bad Neuenahr
TSV Crailsheim	1 – 3	SC Freiburg
SG Jößnitz	1 – 20	FFC Frankfurt
FC Oberneuland	0 – 20	Heike Rheine

== Second round ==
9 November 2003
VfL Wolfsburg	0 – 6	FCR 2001 Duisburg
Hamburg	1 – 2	Turbine Potsdam	(aet)
Bayern Munich	0 – 1	FFC Frankfurt
FF USV Jena	0 – 1	FSV Frankfurt
Magdeburger FFC	0 – 6	Heike Rheine
Victoria Gersten	0 – 5	Brauweiler Pulheim
TuS Niederkirchen II	1 – 3	SC Freiburg
1. FC Saarbrücken	0 – 4	SC 07 Bad Neuenahr

== Quarter-finals ==
14 December 2003
FCR 2001 Duisburg	2 – 3	Heike Rheine	(aet)
FFC Frankfurt	3 – 0	SC Freiburg
Turbine Potsdam	3 – 0	Bad Neuenahr
22 February 2004
Brauweiler Pulheim	2 – 1	FSV Frankfurt

== Semi-finals ==
13 March 2004
FFC Frankfurt	4 – 1	Heike Rheine
21 March 2004
Brauweiler Pulheim	0 – 3	Turbine Potsdam

== Final ==
29 May 2004
16:45 (CEST)

FFC Frankfurt	0 – 3	Turbine Potsdam
		Pohlers 27'; Zietz 50'; Mittag 55'

Olympic Stadium (Berlin)
Attendance: 30,000
Referee: Nicole Schumacher (Oberhausen)

1. FFC FRANKFURT:
GK	1	(Netherlands) Marleen Wissink
DF	(Germany) Katrin Kliehm
DF	(Germany) Christina Zerbe
DF	(Germany) Sandra Minnert
DF	(Germany) Tina Wunderlich
MF	(Germany) Stefanie Weichelt	(substituted off) 45'
MF	(Germany) Louise Hansen
MF	(Germany) Pia Wunderlich
MF	(Germany) Steffi Jones
FW	(Germany) Judith Affeld	(substituted off) 69'
FW	(Germany) Birgit Prinz
Substitutes:
MF	(Germany) Sandra Albertz	(substituted on) 45'
FW	(Germany) Marion Wilmes	(substituted on) 69'
Manager:
(Germany) Monika Staab

1. FFC TURBINE POTSDAM 71:
GK	1	(Germany) Nadine Angerer
DF		(Germany) Peggy Kuznik
DF		(Germany) Inken Becher
DF		(United States) Nancy Augustyniak	(substituted off) 87'
MF		(Germany) Jennifer Zietz
MF		(Germany) Viola Odebrecht
MF		(Germany) Ariane Hingst
MF		(Germany) Navina Omilade
FW		(Germany) Petra Wimbersky	(substituted off) 76'
FW		(Germany) Conny Pohlers	(substituted off) 87'
FW		(Germany) Anja Mittag
Substitutes:
DF		(Germany) Franziska Liepack	(substituted on) 87'
FW		(Poland) Maria Makowska	(substituted on) 76'
FW		(Germany) Annelie Brendel	(substituted on) 87'
Manager:
(Germany) Bernd Schröder
