= Bianca Rech =

German footballer

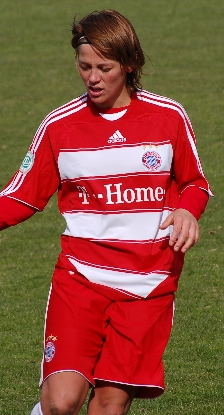

Personal information
- Full name: Bianca Rech
- Date of birth: 25 January 1981 (age 45)
- Place of birth: Bad Neuenahr-Ahrweiler, West Germany
- Height: 1.67 m (5 ft 5 1/2 in)
- Positions: Centre back; defensive midfielder

Youth career
- 1989–1994: SG Westum/Löhndorf
- 1994–1997: SC 07 Bad Neuenahr

Senior career*
Years	Team	Apps	(Gls)
1997–2000	SC 07 Bad Neuenahr	61	(10)
2000–2004	1. FFC Frankfurt	54	(7)
2004–2005	SC 07 Bad Neuenahr	14	(5)
2005	Sunnanå SK		
2006–2010	Bayern Munich	95	(12)
2010–2012	SC 07 Bad Neuenahr	32	(3)
2012–2015	1. FC Köln	34	(11)

International career
2002–2007	Germany	20	(0)
- * Club domestic league appearances and goals

Bianca Rech (born 25 January 1981 in Bad Neuenahr-Ahrweiler, Rhineland-Palatinate) is a German sports director and former professional footballer who is the current director of Frauen-Bundesliga club Bayern Munich.

== Playing career ==
During her playing career, Rech began at hometown club SC 07 Bad Neuenahr before joining 1. FFC Frankfurt, where she won three German league titles and the 2001-02 UEFA Women's Cup (now called UEFA Women's Champions League).

Rech also enjoyed spells with Swedish club Sunnanå SK and Bayern Munich, for whom she made 95 appearances and scored 12 goals between 2006 and 2010.

On the international stage, Rech earned 20 caps for the German national team and she ended her club career at 1. FC Köln.

== Post-playing career ==
Rech is a sports economics graduate and her first role in football following her retirement was at her final club 1. FC Köln as team manager.

The German moved to Bayern, another of the clubs she represented as a player, in September 2016 and worked in a similar team management position for three years.

In 2019, Rech became Bayern Women's sporting director. On 1 April 2023, she was appointed head of the women's footballing department and worked alongside Karin Danner, who had been in the role for an incredible 25 years.

Three months later, Rech officially succeeded Danner as the sole person in charge of Bayern Munich women's football operations.

Bayern won the 2023-24 Frauen-Bundesliga title in what was Rech's first season being fully responsible of the women's footballing department.

In the summer of 2024, it was announced that Rech had been promoted to the role of director following structural changes within Bayern.

== Honours ==
=== 1. FFC Frankfurt ===
- Bundesliga: Winner (3) 2000–01, 2001–02, 2002–03, Runner-up 2003–04
- German Cup: Winner (3) 2000–01, 2001–02, 2002–03, Runner-up 2003–04
- UEFA Women's Cup: Winner 2001–02

=== FC Bayern Munich ===
- Bundesliga: Runner-up 2008–09

=== Germany ===
- UEFA Women's U-18 Championship: Winner 2000, Runner-up 1999
