= 1999–2000 DFB-Pokal Frauen =

Tournament details
- Country: Germany
- Teams: 32

Final positions
- Champions: FFC Frankfurt
- Runners-up: Sportfreunde Siegen

Tournament statistics
- Matches played: 28

The 1999–2000 DFB-Pokal Frauen was the 20th season of the cup competition, Germany's second-most important title in women's football. The first round of the competition was held from 22–25 August 1999. In the final which was held in Berlin on 6 May 2000, FFC Frankfurt defeated Sportfreunde Siegen 2–1 and successfully defended their title from the previous season.

== First round ==
| RSV Windhorst Drosendorf | –^{*} | 1. FC Nürnberg |
| TuS Ahrbach | –^{*} | 1. FC Saarbrücken |
22 August 1999
| FSV Schwarzbach | 1 – 2 | FSV Frankfurt |
| Heike Rheine | 2 – 1 | Flaesheim-Hillen |
| Lorbeer Rothenburgsort | 0 – 4 | FCR Duisburg |
| Erzgebirge Aue | 0 – 3 | WSV Wolfsburg-Wendschott |
| Wittenseer SV | 3 – 2 | FF USV Jena |
| Wattenscheid 09 | 4 – 5 | GSV Moers |
| SG Sand | 2 – 7 | FFC Frankfurt |
| SV Oberteuringen | 6 – 1 | FC Viktoria Neckarshausen |
| SC Freiburg | 0 – 5 | SC 07 Bad Neuenahr |
| FSV Westerstede | 0 – 7 | Grün-Weiss Brauweiler |
| Turbine Potsdam II | 0 – 15 | Turbine Potsdam |
| Hertha Zehlendorf | 3 – 2 | BVB Halle | (aet) |
| SpVgg Oberaußem-Fortuna | 0 – 6 | Sportfreunde Siegen |
25 August 1999
| 1. FC Saarbrücken II | 0 – 3 | TuS Niederkirchen |

^{*} Windhorst Drosendorf and Ahrbach withdrew their teams. Nürnberg and Saarbücken thus advanced to the next round.

== Second round ==
| Hertha Zehlendorf | –^{*} | Grün-Weiss Brauweiler |
25 September 1999
| Wittenseer SV | 0 – 11 | WSV Wolfsburg-Wendschott |
| SC 07 Bad Neuenahr | 1 – 2 | Sportfreunde Siegen |
26 September 1999
| SV Oberteuringen | 1 – 2 | 1. FC Saarbrücken |
| TuS Niederkirchen | 1 – 3 | FFC Frankfurt |
| Heike Rheine | 0 – 5 | FCR Duisburg |
| 1. FC Nürnberg | 0 – 4 | FSV Frankfurt |
| GSV Moers | 2 – 10 | Turbine Potsdam |

^{*} Hertha Zehlendorf withdrew their team. Brauweiler Pulheim thus advanced to the next round.

== Quarter-finals ==
28 November 1999
| WSV Wolfsburg-Wendschott | 0 – 1 | Sportfreunde Siegen |
| 1. FC Saarbrücken | 3 – 1 | Turbine Potsdam | (aet) |
| Grün-Weiss Brauweiler | 4 – 4 | FCR Duisburg | (5–3 on penalties) |
| FSV Frankfurt | 0 – 6 | FFC Frankfurt |

== Semi-finals ==
12 March 2000
| 1. FC Saarbrücken | 1 – 3 | FFC Frankfurt |
| Grün-Weiss Brauweiler | 0 – 3 | Sportfreunde Siegen |

== Final ==
6 May 2000
16:15 (CEST)

| FFC Frankfurt | 2 – 1 | Sportfreunde Siegen |
|---|---|---|
| J. Meier 63'; Lingor 79' | | Menge 87' |

Olympic Stadium (Berlin)
Attendance: 20,000
Referee: Monika Fornaçon (Stöckse)

1. FFC FRANKFURT:
| GK | 1 | (Netherlands) Marleen Wissink |
| DF | | (Germany) Doris Fitschen |
| DF | | (Germany) Claudia Obermeyer |
| DF | | (Japan) Rie Yamaki |
| DF | | (Germany) Anja Zorn |
| MF | | (Germany) Nia Künzer |
| MF | | (Germany) Renate Lingor |
| MF | | (Germany) Tina Wunderlich |
| FW | | (Germany) Birgit Prinz |
| FW | | (Germany) Heidi Mohr |
| FW | | (Germany) Jennifer Meier |

SPORTFREUNDE SIEGEN VON 1899:
| GK | 1 | (Germany) Silke Rottenberg |
| DF | | (Germany) Janine Jung |
| DF | | (Germany) Andrea Euteneuer |
| DF | | (Hungary) Beáta Fülöp |
| DF | | (Germany) Sandra Minnert |
| MF | | (Germany) Louise Hansen |
| MF | | (Denmark) Karina Sefron |
| MF | | (Denmark) Linette Sørensen |
| MF | | (Germany) Alexandra Alfes |
| FW | | (Germany) Monika Meyer |
| FW | | (Denmark) Merete Pedersen |
