= 2002–03 DFB-Pokal Frauen =

Tournament details
- Country: Germany
- Teams: 32

Final positions
- Champions: FFC Frankfurt
- Runners-up: FCR 2001 Duisburg

Tournament statistics
- Matches played: 31

The Frauen DFB-Pokal 2002–03 was the 23rd season of the cup competition, Germany's second-most important title in women's football. The first round of the competition began on 17 August 2002. In the final which was held in Berlin on 31 May 2003, FFC Frankfurt defeated FCR 2001 Duisburg 1–0, thus claiming their fifth title, all consecutive.

== First round ==
17 August 2002
1. FC Saarbrücken	0 – 5	SC 07 Bad Neuenahr
18 August 2002
Erzgebirge Aue	0 – 8	Bayern Munich
Turbine Potsdam II	2 – 4	Tennis Borussia Berlin
FF USV Jena	0 – 1	WSV Wolfsburg-Wendschott
FSV 02 Schwerin	1 – 2	Hallescher FC
ATS Buntentor	1 – 16	Brauweiler Pulheim
TSV Schilksee	6 – 1	Hamburg II
FSV Jägersburg	0 – 5	SC Freiburg
SC 07 Bad Neuenahr II	0 – 4	TuS Niederkirchen
TSV Crailsheim	1 – 11	FFC Frankfurt
Karlsruher SC	1 – 3	1. FC Nürnberg
DFC Allendorf	0 – 10	FSV Frankfurt
FSV Westerstede	0 – 12	FCR 2001 Duisburg
TuS Köln rrh.	1 – 2	GSV Moers	(aet)
25 August 2002
Gütersloh 2000	1 – 6	Heike Rheine
28 September 2002
Hamburg	2 – 0	Turbine Potsdam

== Second round ==
12 October 2002
TSV Schilksee	2 – 5	WSV Wolfsburg-Wendschott
13 October 2002
GSV Moers	0 – 8	FCR 2001 Duisburg
Heike Rheine	0 – 7	FFC Frankfurt
TuS Niederkirchen	2 – 4	FSV Frankfurt
Hamburg	0 – 4	Bayern Munich
1. FC Nürnberg	0 – 3	SC Freiburg
Hallescher FC	0 – 5	Tennis Borussia Berlin
Brauweiler Pulheim	6 – 4	SC 07 Bad Neuenahr

== Quarter-finals ==
23 November 2002
Brauweiler Pulheim	2 – 0	SC Freiburg
FCR 2001 Duisburg	3 – 0	WSV Wolfsburg-Wendschott
24 November 2002
Bayern Munich	0 – 1	FFC Frankfurt
Tennis Borussia Berlin	0 – 3	FSV Frankfurt

== Semi-finals ==
In the semi-finals FSV Frankfurt hosted local rivals FFC Frankfurt for the third time in a row, losing as in both games before.

23 March 2003
FSV Frankfurt	0 – 3	FFC Frankfurt
Brauweiler Pulheim	1 – 2	FCR 2001 Duisburg

== Final ==
31 May 2003
16:30 (CEST)

FFC Frankfurt	1 – 0	FCR 2001 Duisburg
Voss 89' (o.g.)

Olympic Stadium (Berlin)
Attendance: 30,000
Referee: Bibiana Steinhaus (Hanover)

1. FFC FRANKFURT:
GK	1	(Netherlands) Marleen Wissink
DF		(Germany) Tina Wunderlich
DF		(Germany) Bianca Rech
DF		(Germany) Christina Zerbe	(substituted off) 35'
MF		(Germany) Sandra Minnert
MF		(Germany) Louise Hansen
MF		(Germany) Renate Lingor
MF		(Germany) Nia Künzer
MF		(Germany) Patrizia Barucha	(substituted off) 25'
FW		(Germany) Jennifer Meier
FW		(Germany) Judith Affeld	(substituted off) 67'
Substitutes:
DF		(Germany) Stefanie Weichelt	(substituted on) 35'
MF		(France) Elodie Woock	(substituted on) 25'
FW		(Germany) Pia Wunderlich	(substituted on) 67'
Manager:
(Germany) Monika Staab

FC RUMELN 2001 DUISBURG:
GK	1	(Germany) Kerstin Wasems
DF		(Germany) Carina Chojnacki
DF		(Germany) Petra Hauser
DF		(Germany) Linda Bresonik	(substituted off) 52'
MF		(Germany) Stephanie Schubert
MF		(Germany) Jennifer Oster	(substituted off) 86'
MF		(Germany) Anne van Bonn
MF		(Germany) Martina Voss
FW		(Germany) Mirja Kothe	(substituted off) 65'
FW		(Germany) Inka Grings
FW		(Germany) Shelley Thompson
Substitutes:
DF		(Germany) Elena Hauer	(substituted on) 52'
MF		(Germany) Melanie Krohnen	(substituted on) 86'
MF		(Germany) Corina Schröder	(substituted on) 65'
Manager:
(Germany) Jürgen Krust
