= Stefanie Weichelt =

German footballer

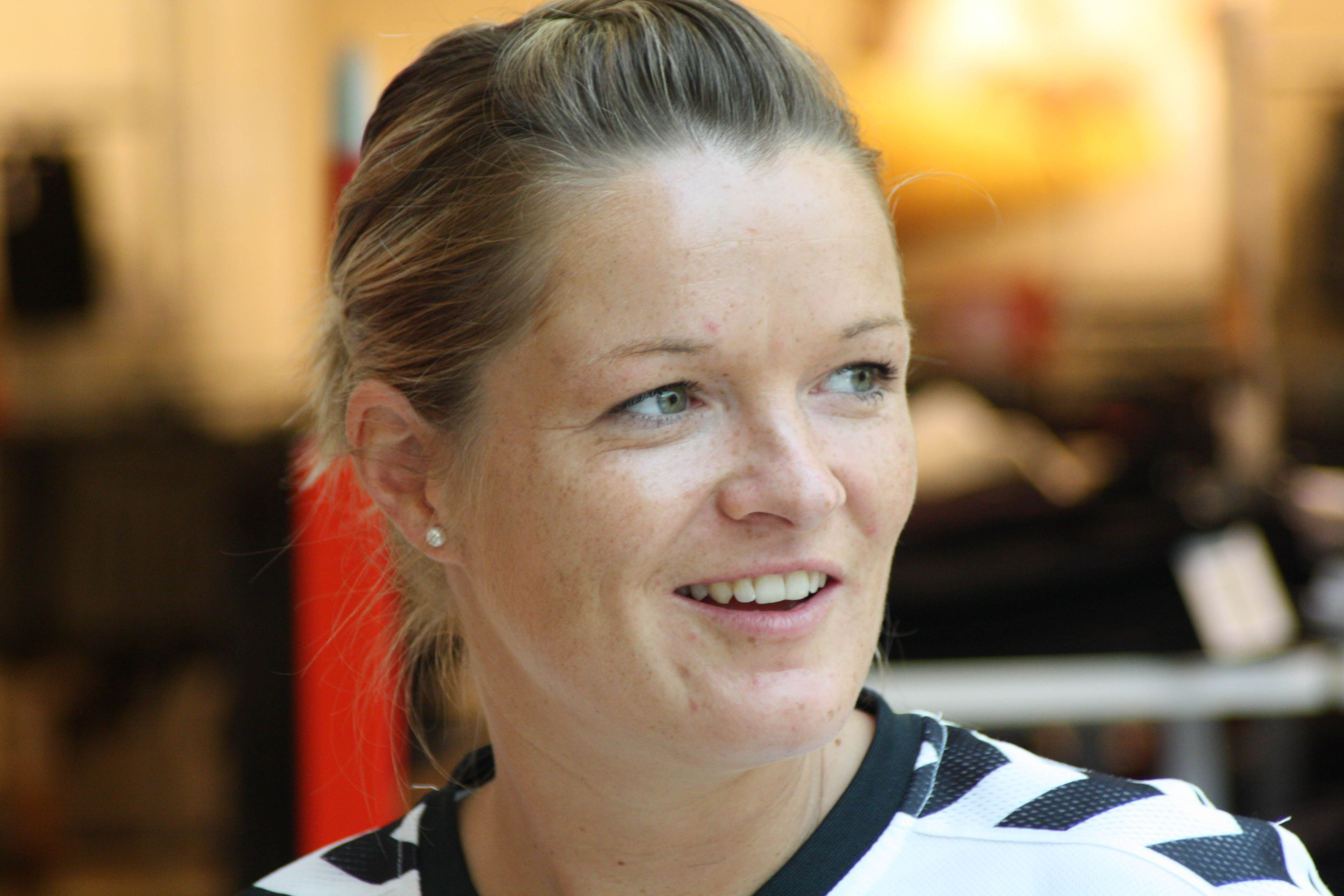

Personal information
- Full name: Stefanie Weichelt
- Date of birth: 23 August 1983 (age 43)
- Place of birth: Parchim, Bezirk Schwerin, East Germany
- Height: 1.61 m (5 ft 3 1/2 in)
- Positions: Winger; striker

Youth career
- SG Marnitz-Suckow
- –2000: SV Grün-Weiß Mestlin

Senior career*
Years	Team	Apps	(Gls)
2000–2002	1. FFC Turbine Potsdam	41	(9)
2002–2005	1. FFC Frankfurt	27	(6)
2005–2010	SG Essen-Schönebeck	75	(28)
2010–2013	FCR 2001 Duisburg		
2014–2018	MSV Duisburg		
- * Club domestic league appearances and goals as of 06:32, 22 June 2010 (UTC)

Stefanie Weichelt (born 23 August 1983 in Parchim, Bezirk Schwerin) is a German footballer. She currently plays for MSV Duisburg. Weichelt has played in numerous positions throughout her career but prefers to play as an attacking midfielder.

== Honours ==
=== 1. FFC Turbine Potsdam ===
- Bundesliga: Runner-up (2) 2000–01, 2001–02

=== 1. FFC Frankfurt ===
- Bundesliga: Winner (2) 2002–03, 2004–05, Runner-up (1) 2003–04
- German Cup: Winner (1) 2002–03, Runner-up (2) 2003–04, 2004–05

=== Germany ===
- UEFA Women's U-19 Championship: Winner (1) 2002
