= 1964–65 Rheinlandliga =

1. Amateurliga Rheinland
- Season: 1964–65
- Champions: SpVgg Bendorf
- Relegated: SC Oberlahnstein, VfB Wissen, TuS Mosella Schweich

The 1964–65 Rheinlandliga was the 13th season of the highest amateur class of the Rhineland Football Association under the name of 1. Amateurliga Rheinland. It was a predecessor of today's Rheinlandliga.

== Results ==
Rhineland champion was SpVgg Bendorf. SSV Mülheim participated as a Rhineland representative in the German football amateur championship 1965, failed there in the quarter finale against the Westphalia representative SpVgg Erkenschwick.

The relegation to the second amateur league was made by SC Oberlahnstein, VfB Wissen and newcomer TuS Mosella Schweich. For the following 1965–66 season, SV Prüm, FV Rübenach and Sportfreunde Herdorf moved up from the 2. Amateur league, as well as from the descendant Germania Metternich from the II. Division.

Rank	Clubs	Games	Goals	Points
1.	SpVgg Bendorf	30	92:39	47:13
2.	SSV Mülheim	30	70:34	42:18
3.	VfL Neuwied	30	72:51	39:21
4.	BSV Weißenthurm	30	76:54	38:22
5.	SC 07 Bad Neuenahr (N)	30	73:55	34:26
6.	SpVgg Andernach	30	69:60	34:26
7.	FV Engers 07	30	56:49	34:26
8.	Alemannia Plaidt	30	74:71	32:28
9.	SC Sinzig	30	70:81	30:30
10.	TuS Mayen	30	53:59	29:31
11.	VfL Trier	30	50:60	25:35
12.	SV Niederlahnstein (A)	30	57:61	24:36
13.	SG Altenkirchen (N)	30	48:83	22:38
14.	SC Oberlahnstein	30	49:75	28:42
15.	VfB Wissen	30	35:74	17:43
16.	TuS Mosella Schweich (N)	30	41:79	15:45

	Division Champion
	Relegation to 2. Amateur League
(M)	Previous year's champions
(A)	Previous year's descendants from the 2nd Division
(N)	Previous year's climbers from the 2. Amateur League
