= 1961–62 Rheinlandliga =

1. Amateurliga Rheinland
- Season: 1961–62
- Champions: VfB Wissen
- Relegated: SG Altenkirchen, FC Urbar, SV Leiwen, SV Ehrang

The 1961–62 Rheinlandliga was the tenth season of the highest amateur class of the Rhineland Football Association under the name of 1. Amateurliga Rheinland. It was a predecessor of today's Rheinlandliga. It was the sixth season in which the league played with two game divisions, East and West. The Rhineland champion was determined through a game between the division champions.

The 1. Amateurliga was below II. Division Southwest until 1963 and therefore the third-class in the hierarchy. In the seasons 1956–57 to 1962–63 the league was played in two divisions (East and West). The two division champions played to determine the Rhineland champion. With the introduction of the regional league Southwest as second highest class, starting in the 1963–64 season, the Amateur league Rheinland was again combined into one division. Beginning in the 1974–75 season, the league played a role as a sub-team to the newly introduced 2. Bundesliga, where the Rhineland champion played in a relegation against the champion of the Verbandsliga Südwest and the Saarlandliga, for a position in the south divisions of the 2. Bundesliga. Starting from the 1978–79 season, the Oberliga Rheinland-Pfalz/Saar was introduced as the highest amateur class and this class was renamed to the "Verbandsliga Rheinland" and since then only fourth class.

== Results ==
Rhineland champion was the winner of the East division, VfB Wissen, after a victory over the West division champion, BSV Weißenthurm. The following move up to the II. Division Southwest ended triumphantly with second place, which justified the promotion.

SG Altenkirchen, FC Urbar, SV Leiwen and Rhineland champion from the previous year, SV Ehrang, moved down into the 2. Amateur League.

For the following season 1962–63, promoted from the 2. Amateur league were:

- From the East division: TuS Montabaur, SpVgg Neuwied, SpVgg Bendorf
- From the West division: VfL Pünderich

=== East Division ===
Rang	Verein	Spiele	Tore	Punkte
1.	VfB Wissen (M)	24	85:27	39:9
2.	SC Oberlahnstein	24	84:59	31:17
3.	SSV Heimbach-Weis	24	73:52	31:17
4.	Adler Niederfischbach	24	59:48	28:20
5.	VfL Neuwied	24	62:47	25:23
6.	SC Eitelborn	24	59:81	23:25
7.	Sportfreunde Herdorf	24	56:61	22:26
8.	SV Elkenroth	24	43:57	21:27
9.	Eintracht Höhr-Grenzhausen	24	59:69	20:28
10.	SV Niederbieber (N)	24	53:65	20:28
11.	SSV Bad Hönningen	24	46:63	19:29
12.	SG Altenkirchen (N)	24	54:71	17:31
13.	FC Urbar	24	35:68	16:32

=== West Division ===
Rang	Verein	Spiele	Tore	Punkte
1.	BSV Weißenthurm	26	83:37	38:14
2.	Alemannia Plaidt	26	77:44	38:14
3.	SC Sinzig	26	74:52	31:21
4.	SV Prüm	26	60:59	28:24
5.	TuS Mayen	26	70:63	26:26
6.	SpVgg Andernach (A)	26	50:44	26:26
7.	VfB Lützel	26	53:60	25:27
8.	SC 07 Bad Neuenahr	26	50:52	24:28
9.	TuS Mosella Schweich	26	54:63	23:29
10.	TuS Saarburg	26	47:64	23:29
11.	VfL Trier	26	52:70	23:29
12.	FV Rübenach (N)	26	48:66	23:29
13.	SV Leiwen (N)	26	59:73	20:32
14.	SV Ehrang (M)	26	42:72	16:38

	Division Champion
	Relegation to 2. Amateur League
(M)	Previous year's champions
(A)	Previous year's descendants from the 2nd Division
(N)	Previous year's climbers from the 2. Amateur League
