= 2001–02 DFB-Pokal Frauen =

Tournament details
- Country: Germany
- Teams: 31

Final positions
- Champions: FFC Frankfurt
- Runners-up: Hamburg

Tournament statistics
- Matches played: 30

The Frauen DFB-Pokal 2001–02 was the 22nd season of the cup competition. Germany's second-most important title in women's football. The first round of the competition began on 22 September 2001. In the final which was held in Berlin on 11 May 2002 FFC Frankfurt defeated Hamburg 5–0, thus claiming their fourth title, all consecutive.

== 1st round ==
FFC Frankfurt's 20–0 victory over Karlsruher SC is tied for the highest victory ever in the cup.

| HSV Borussia Friedenstal | —^{*} | bye |
22 September 2001
| SV Victoria Gersten | 3 – 2 | Hallescher FC |
23 September 2001
| Tennis Borussia Berlin | 0 – 2 | Hamburg |
| 1. FC Saarbrücken II | 0 – 7 | SC 07 Bad Neuenahr II |
| Erzgebirge Aue | 2 – 7 | Bayern Munich |
| FF USV Jena | 1 – 3 | FSV Frankfurt |
| Ratzeburger SV | 0 – 5 | WSV Wolfsburg-Wendschott |
| Turbine Potsdam II | 0 – 5 | Turbine Potsdam |
| FC Eintracht Schwerin | 0 – 2 | ATS Buntentor |
| TSV Jahn Calden | 1 – 5 | Heike Rheine |
| Sportfreunde Siegen | 0 – 9 | FCR 2001 Duisburg |
| TuS Niederkirchen | 1 – 3 | SC 07 Bad Neuenahr |
| 1. FC Saarbrücken | 1 – 2 | Brauweiler Pulheim |
| Karlsruher SC | 0 – 20 | FFC Frankfurt |
| TSV Pfersee Augsburg | 0 – 3 | SC Freiburg |
3 October 2001
| GSV Moers | 1 – 4 | SpVgg Oberaußem-Fortuna |

^{*} FFC Flaesheim-Hillen was declared insolvent after the 2000–01 season. One team thus had to receive a bye which was HSV Borussia Friedenstal.

== 2nd round ==
17 October 2001
| SC 07 Bad Neuenahr II | 2 – 4 | SC 07 Bad Neuenahr |
21 October 2001
| SpVgg Oberaußem-Fortuna | 1 – 2 | Hamburg | (aet) |
| ATS Buntentor | 0 – 8 | SC Freiburg |
| Bayern Munich | 0 – 2 | FFC Frankfurt |
| HSV Borussia Friedenstal | 0 – 10 | Turbine Potsdam |
| SV Victoria Gersten | 0 – 5 | FCR 2001 Duisburg |
| WSV Wolfsburg-Wendschott | 0 – 7 | FSV Frankfurt |
| Brauweiler Pulheim | 4 – 0 | Heike Rheine |

== Quarter-finals ==
11 November 2001
| Hamburg | 1 – 0 | Brauweiler Pulheim |
| SC Freiburg | 2 – 3 | Turbine Potsdam |
| FSV Frankfurt | 2 – 1 | FCR 2001 Duisburg |
| SC 07 Bad Neuenahr | 0 – 2 | FFC Frankfurt |

== Semi-finals ==
24 March 2002
| FSV Frankfurt | 0 – 4 | FFC Frankfurt |
| Hamburg | 3 – 2 | Turbine Potsdam |

== Final ==
11 May 2002
16:15 (CEST)

| FFC Frankfurt | 5 – 0 | Hamburg |
|---|---|---|
| Prinz 11' 82' 89'; Lingor 30'; Künzer 90' |

Olympic Stadium (Berlin)
Attendance: 20,000
Referee: Rebekka Kirchner (Benshausen)

1. FFC FRANKFURT:
| GK | 1 | (Netherlands) Marleen Wissink |
| DF | | (Germany) Tina Wunderlich |
| DF | | (Germany) Jutta Nardenbach | (substituted off) 65' |
| DF | | (Germany) Sandra Minnert |
| MF | | (Germany) Louise Hansen | (substituted off) 46' |
| MF | | (Germany) Pia Wunderlich |
| MF | | (Germany) Renate Lingor |
| MF | | (Germany) Katrin Kliehm | (substituted off) 71' |
| MF | | (Germany) Nia Künzer |
| FW | | (Germany) Birgit Prinz |
| FW | | (Germany) Steffi Jones |
Substitutes:
| DF | | (Germany) Bianca Rech | (substituted on) 65' |
| MF | | (Germany) Jennifer Meier | (substituted on) 46' |
| FW | | (Germany) Judith Affeld | (substituted on) 71' |

HAMBURGER SV:
| GK | 1 | (Germany) Claudia von Lanken |
| DF | | (Germany) Alexandra Gärtner |
| DF | | (Germany) Mirja Hermann | (substituted off) 46' |
| DF | | (Germany) Britta Carlson |
| DF | | (Germany) Vanessa Schröer |
| MF | | (Germany) Silva Lone Saländer |
| MF | | (Germany) Tina Hüllen | (substituted off) 90' |
| MF | | (Germany) Svenja Cohn |
| MF | | (Germany) Claudia Wenzel |
| FW | | (Germany) Aferdita Kameraj | (substituted off) 78' |
| FW | | (Germany) Tanja Vreden |
Substitutes:
| DF | | (Germany) Claudia Schulz | (substituted on) 46' |
| MF | | (Germany) Tanja Brüske | (substituted on) 90' |
| FW | | (Germany) Anne Carbow | (substituted on) 78' |
