= Magdeburger FFC =

- Full name: Magdeburger Frauenfußballclub
- Founded: 1997
- Dissolved: 2023
- Ground: Heinrich Germer Stadium
- Capacity: 4,990
- President: Karl-Edo Fecht
- Manager: Michael Böhm
- League: Regionalliga Nordost
- 2023–24: 8th
| Home colours | Away colours |

Magdeburger FFC was a women's football club from Magdeburg. The club was founded in 1997 and won promotion to the 2. Fußball-Bundesliga in 2009.

== History ==
The club's roots lie with local sports club SG Handwerk Magdeburg. In the only official East German championship, the 1990–91 season, the team finished last. In 1991 the football department joined SV Fortuna Magdeburg, but in the next few years the team's performance was inconsistent. After a few mid-table results the team battled against relegation at the end of the 1990s. In 1997 the football department left the club again and created a new club, FSV Fortuna Magdeburg/Wolmirstedt. To further emphasize their independence from Fortuna Magdeburg, the club changed its name to Magdeburger FFC on 1 July 2003.

One year later, Magdeburg narrowly missed out on qualifying for the newly created 2nd Bundesliga, finishing 6th in the Regionalliga. In the DFB-Pokal the team reached the 2nd round for the first time in its history, losing 0–6 to Bundesliga side FFC Heike Rheine. As of July 2010, Magdeburg has qualified for the DFB-Pokal 14 times, twelve times by winning the Saxony-Anhalt Cup and twice by virtue of belonging to the 2nd Bundesliga.

In the next three years, 2005 through 2007, Magdeburg finished second in the Regionalliga. In the 2006–07 season, the club fought for the championship against 1. FC Union Berlin and SV Blau-Weiß Hohen Neuendorf, but as Magdeburg had not applied for a license for the 2nd Bundesliga, winning the championship would not have meant promotion. In 2009, the team finally finished first and was promoted to the 2. Fußball-Bundesliga Nord. In its first Bundesliga season they finished sixth.

The reserve team won promotion to the Regionalliga Nordost in the 2009–10 season, additionally the club sports several youth teams, ranging from an Under-11 squad to two Under-17 teams.

In November 2023, members of Magdeburger FFC and 1. FC Magdeburg voted to merge the women's section of the two clubs into 1. FC Magdeburg Frauen, effective 1 January 2024. However, the club competed under the name Magdeburger FFC until the end of the 2023–24 Regionalliga Nordost season.

== Honours ==
- Regionalliga Nordost: 1
  - Champions 2009
  - Runners-up 2005, 2006, 2007
- Saxony-Anhalt Cup: 21 (Record)
  - Winners 1992, 1993, 1995, 1996, 1997, 1998, 2000, 2003, 2004, 2005, 2007, 2008, 2009, 2016, 2017, 2018, 2019, 2020, 2022, 2023, 2024
- Saxony-Anhalt Indoor Championship: 6
  - Winners 1998, 2000, 2002, 2004, 2007, 2008
- U17 NOFV Championship: 1
  - Winners 2007

== Past seasons ==
| Season | League | Rank | W | D | L | Goals | Points | DFB-Pokal |
|---|---|---|---|---|---|---|---|---|
| 1990/91 | Oberliga Nordost | 10 | | | | 14:63 | 6:30 | outside DFB area |
| 1991/92 | Oberliga Nordost | 6 | 8 | 3 | 9 | 25:33 | 19:21 | not qualified |
| 1992/93 | Regionalliga Nordost | 8 | 7 | 7 | 8 | 29:32 | 21:23 | 1st round |
| 1993/94 | Regionalliga Nordost | 4 | 9 | 5 | 8 | 40:45 | 23:21 | 1st round |
| 1994/95 | Regionalliga Nordost | 7 | 7 | 4 | 11 | 26:43 | 18:26 | not qualified |
| 1995/96 | Regionalliga Nordost | 4 | 11 | 3 | 6 | 41:27 | 36 | 1st round |
| 1996/97 | Regionalliga Nordost | 6 | 9 | 3 | 10 | 43:44 | 30 | 1st round |
| 1997/98 | Regionalliga Nordost | 9 | 5 | 1 | 14 | 27:71 | 16 | 1st round |
| 1998/99 | Regionalliga Nordost | 9 | 3 | 3 | 12 | 29:64 | 12 | 1st round |
| 1999/00 | Regionalliga Nordost | 5 | 12 | 4 | 6 | 56:37 | 40 | not qualified |
| 2000/01 | Regionalliga Nordost | 3 | 11 | 8 | 3 | 59:37 | 41 | 1st round |
| 2001/02 | Regionalliga Nordost | 9 | 6 | 2 | 14 | 29:52 | 20 | not qualified |
| 2002/03 | Regionalliga Nordost | 6 | | | | 30:48 | 26 | not qualified |
| 2003/04 | Regionalliga Nordost | 6 | 9 | 2 | 11 | 42:57 | 29 | 2nd round |
| 2004/05 | Regionalliga Nordost | 2 | 15 | 1 | 6 | 63:39 | 46 | 1st round |
| 2005/06 | Regionalliga Nordost | 2 | 15 | 4 | 3 | 63:22 | 48 | 1st round |
| 2006/07 | Regionalliga Nordost | 2 | 19 | 1 | 2 | 87:21 | 58 | not qualified |
| 2007/08 | Regionalliga Nordost | 4 | 12 | 5 | 5 | 53:24 | 41 | 1st round |
| 2008/09 | Regionalliga Nordost | 1 | 16 | 2 | 4 | 64:20 | 50 | 2nd round |
| 2009/10 | 2. Bundesliga | 6 | 9 | 4 | 9 | 36:34 | 31 | 2nd round |
| 2010/11 | 2. Bundesliga Nord | 9 | 4 | 7 | 11 | 23:32 | 19 | 2nd round |
| 2011/12 | 2. Bundesliga Nord | 6 | 8 | 4 | 10 | 29:34 | 28 | 2nd round |
| 2012/13 | 2. Bundesliga Nord | 8 | 6 | 6 | 10 | 28:36 | 24 | 2nd round |
| 2013/14 | 2. Bundesliga Nord | 8 | 6 | 8 | 8 | 30:42 | 26 | 2nd round |
| 2014/15 | 2. Bundesliga Nord | 12 | 1 | 2 | 19 | 21:73 | 5 | 2nd round |
| 2015/16 | Regionalliga Nordost | 2 | 14 | 4 | 2 | 58:23 | 46 | 2nd round |
| 2016/17 | Regionalliga Nordost | 2 | 13 | 3 | 2 | 56:13 | 43 | 2nd round |
| 2017/18 | Regionalliga Nordost | 2 | 18 | 1 | 3 | 87:20 | 55 | 2nd round |
| 2018/19 | Regionalliga Nordost | 4 | 14 | 2 | 6 | 51:29 | 44 | 1st round |
| 2019/20 | Regionalliga Nordost | 6 | 7 | 1 | 7 | 44:33 | 22 | 1st round |
| 2020/21 | Regionalliga Nordost Süd | 1 | 4 | 1 | 0 | 14:6 | 13 | 2nd round |
| 2021/22 | Regionalliga Nordost | 11 | 3 | 3 | 8 | 19:28 | 12 | 1st round |
| 2022/23 | Regionalliga Nordost | 5 | 15 | 3 | 8 | 71:53 | 48 | 2nd round |
| 2023/24 | Regionalliga Nordost | 8 | 8 | 2 | 12 | 37:65 | 26 | 2nd round |
