= Marleen Wissink =

Dutch footballer (born 1969)

Personal information
- Full name: Marleen Wissink
- Date of birth: 4 July 1969 (age 57)
- Place of birth: Enschede, Netherlands
- Position: Goalkeeper

Senior career*
Years	Team	Apps	(Gls)
- Weerselo
- Rheine
- Puck Deventer
1996–2007	Frankfurt		

International career
1989–2006	Netherlands	141	
- * Club domestic league appearances and goals

Marleen Wissink is a former Dutch football goalkeeper. She played at 1.FFC Frankfurt for more than a decade, winning two UEFA Women's Cups and five Bundesligas.

She was a member of the Dutch national team. With 141 international games she was the most capped Dutch player in her time, but she has since been overtaken.

== Honours ==
Club

Frankfurt

- Bundesliga (5): 1999, 2001, 2002, 2003, 2005
- DFB-Pokal (5): 1999, 2000, 2001, 2002, 2003
- UEFA Women's Cup (2): 2002, 2006
