= 2000–01 DFB-Pokal Frauen =

Tournament details
- Country: Germany
- Teams: 32

Final positions
- Champions: FFC Frankfurt
- Runners-up: Flaesheim-Hillen

Tournament statistics
- Matches played: 31

The Frauen DFB-Pokal 2000–01 was the 21st season of the cup competition, Germany's second-most important title in women's football. The first round of the competition was held on 19–20 August 2000. In the final which was held in Berlin on 26 May 2001 FFC Frankfurt defeated Flaesheim-Hillen 2–1, thus claiming their third title, all consecutive. On their road to the final all games of Flaesheim-Hillen except the first had to be decided by a penalty shootout.

== 1st round ==
19 August 2000
Fortuna Magdeburg-Wolmirstedt	1 – 6	Flaesheim-Hillen
TSV Pfersee Augsburg	0 – 5	SC 07 Bad Neuenahr
1. FC Nürnberg	1 – 5	Bayern Munich
SpVgg Rehweiler-Matzenbach	0 – 4	FSV Frankfurt
20 October 2000
Berliner SV 92	0 – 16	Turbine Potsdam
FF USV Jena	0 – 7	Brauweiler Pulheim
Hamburger SV	2 – 1	FCR 2001 Duisburg	(aet)
Turbine Potsdam II	1 – 4	Essen-Schönebeck
DJK FSV Schwarzbach	0 – 2	1. FC Saarbrücken
PSV 90 Neubrandenburg	1 – 13	WSV Wolfsburg-Wendschott
HSV Borussia Friedenstal	5 – 0	SV Neuenbrook/Rethwisch
1. FC Saarbrücken II	0 – 7	FFC Frankfurt
TuS Niederkirchen	0 – 2	SC Freiburg
SC 07 Bad Neuenahr II	1 – 5	FC Viktoria Neckarhausen
SV Victoria Gersten	2 – 5	Heike Rheine
ATS Buntentor	0 – 5	Sportfreunde Siegen

== 2nd round ==
5 November 2000
Hamburg	1 – 1	Flaesheim-Hillen	(4–5 on penalties)
Essen-Schönebeck	0 – 11	Turbine Potsdam
Heike Rheine	1 – 2	Brauweiler Pulheim
Bayern Munich	5 – 1	1. FC Saabrücken
1. FFC Frankfurt	10 – 0	Sportfreunde Siegen
HSV Borussia Friedenstal	1 – 5	WSV Wolfsburg-Wendschott
SC Freiburg	2 – 2	SC 07 Bad Neuenahr	(4–5 on penalties)
FC Viktoria Neckarhausen	0 – 5	FSV Frankfurt

== Quarter-finals ==
4 March 2001
FSV Frankfurt	3 – 2	Bayern Munich
WSV Wolfsburg-Wendschott	2 – 3	FFC Frankfurt
SC 07 Bad Neuenahr	2 – 2	Turbine Potsdam	(5–6 on penalties)
25 March 2001
Flaesheim-Hillen	0 – 0	Brauweiler Pulheim	(3–2 on penalties)

== Semi-finals ==
25 March 2001
FSV Frankfurt	1 – 2	FFC Frankfurt
Turbine Potsdam	0 – 0	Flaesheim-Hillen	(2–4 on penalties)

== Final ==
26 May 2001
16:00 (CEST)

FFC Frankfurt	2 – 1	Flaesheim-Hillen
Prinz 48'; J. Meier 77'		A. Meier 44'

Olympic Stadium (Berlin)
Attendance: 30,000
Referee: Christine Beck (Darmsheim)

1. FFC FRANKFURT:
GK	1	(Netherlands) Marleen Wissink
DF	(Germany) Tina Wunderlich
DF	(Germany) Jutta Nardenbach
DF	(Germany) Sandra Minnert
MF	(Germany) Nia Künzer
MF	(Germany) Pia Wunderlich
MF	(Germany) Renate Lingor
MF	(Germany) Steffi Jones
MF	(Germany) Judith Affeld	(substituted off) 63'
MF	(Germany) Jennifer Meier
FW	(Germany) Birgit Prinz
Substitutes:
MF	(Germany) Bianca Rech	(substituted on) 63'

FFC FLAESHEIM-HILLEN:
GK	1	(Germany) Melanie Höfkes
DF		(Germany) Carina Terberl
DF		(Germany) Claudia Mandrysch
DF		(Japan) Hiromi Katagiri
DF		(Germany) Kerstin Stegemann
MF		(Germany) Silke van der Berg
MF		(Germany) Katrin Lange
MF		(Germany) Annika Schmidt
MF		(Germany) Jeannette Götte	(substituted off) 83'
FW		(Germany) Kathrin Voss
FW		(Germany) Antje Meier	(substituted off) 85'
Substitutes:
MF		(Germany) Stefanie Pohl	(substituted on) 83'
FW		(Germany) Isabel Janßen	(substituted on) 85'
