= Sandra Minnert =

German footballer (born 1973)

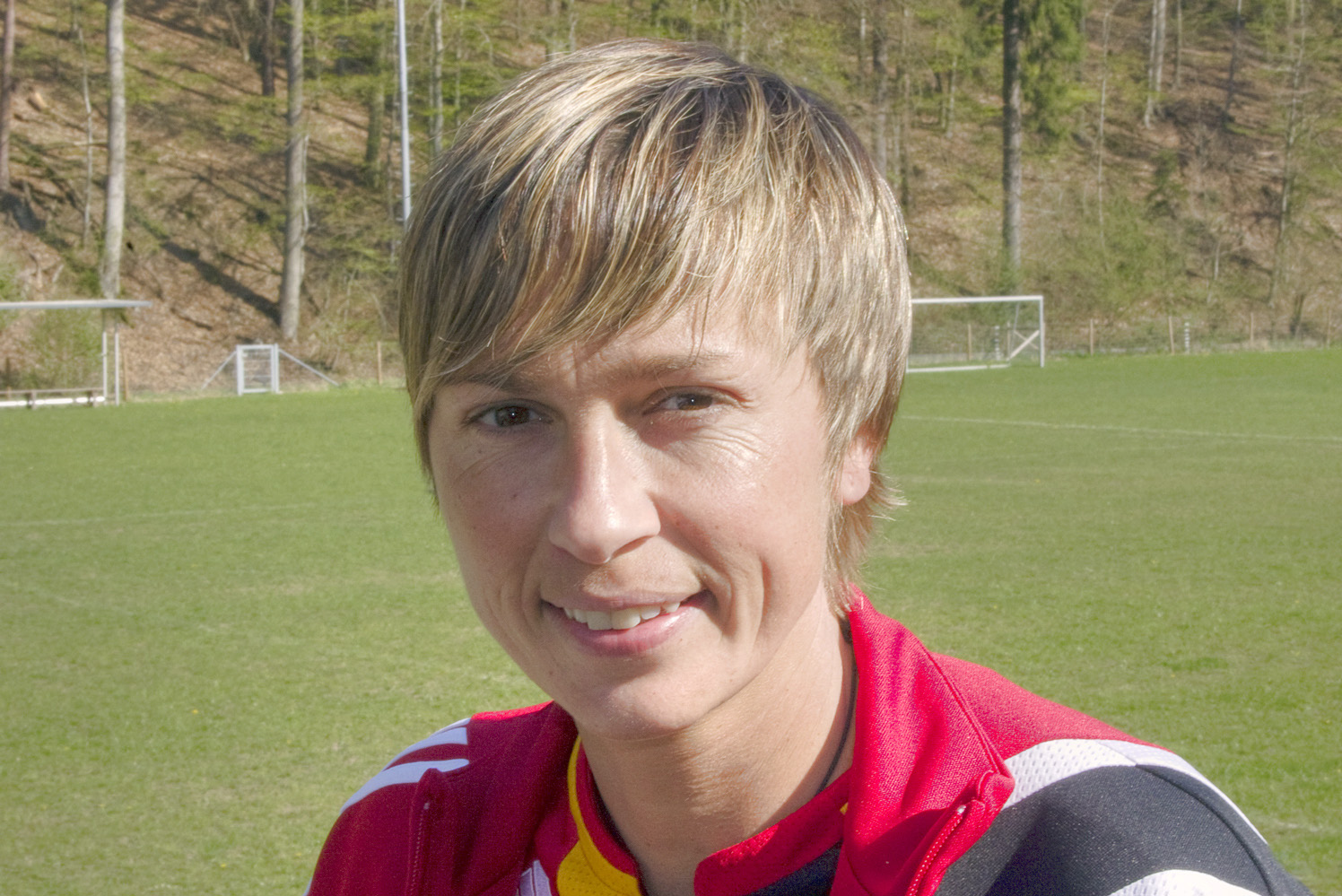

Personal information
- Full name: Sandra Minnert
- Date of birth: 7 April 1973 (age 53)
- Place of birth: Gedern, West Germany
- Height: 1.73 m (5 ft 8 in)
- Position: Defender

Youth career
- 1979–1987: SG Gelhaar/Usenborn
- 1987–1990: TSG Bleichenbach

Senior career*
Years	Team	Apps	(Gls)
1990–1999	FSV Frankfurt		
1999–2000	Sportfreunde Siegen		
2000–2004	1.FFC Frankfurt		
2003	Washington Freedom		
2004–2008	SC 07 Bad Neuenahr		

International career^{‡}
1994–2008	Germany	147	(16)

Managerial career
- 2009–2013: SC 07 Bad Neuenahr
Medal record
Women's football
Representing Germany
Olympic Games
Bronze medal – third place	2000 Sydney	Team Competition
Bronze medal – third place	2004 Athens	Team Competition
FIFA Women's World Cup
Silver medal – second place	1995 Sweden	Team
Gold medal – first place	2003 USA	Team
Gold medal – first place	2007 China	Team
- * Club domestic league appearances and goals ‡ National team caps and goals as of 1 November 2007

Sandra Minnert (born 7 April 1973) is a former German football defender. She played for SC 07 Bad Neuenahr and the German national team. She was a member of the World Cup finalists team from Germany in 1995 and the winning teams from 2003 and 2007

== Honours ==
FSV Frankfurt

- Bundesliga: Winner 1994–95, 1997–98
- DFB-Pokal: Winner 1991–92, 1994–95, 1995–96
- DFB-Hallenpokal for women: Winner 1995

1. FFC Frankfurt

- Bundesliga: Winner 2000–01, 2001–02, 2002–03
- DFB-Pokal: Winner 2000–01, 2001–02, 2002–03
- UEFA Women's Champions League: Winner 2001–02
- DFB-Hallenpokal for women: Winner 2002

Washington Freedom

- Women's United Soccer Association: Winner 2003

Germany

- FIFA Women's World Cup: Winner 2003, 2007, Runners-up 1995
- UEFA Women's Championship: Winner 1995, 1997, 2001, 2005
- Football at the Summer Olympics: Bronze medal 2000, 2004

== Individual ==
- FIFA Women's World Cup All Star Team: 2003
- Silbernes Lorbeerblatt: Winner 1995, 1997, 2001, 2003, 2005, 2007

== Coaching career ==
Minnert was named as the new head coach of her club SC 07 Bad Neuenahr on 6 April 2009.
