= Ariane Hingst =

German footballer (born 1979)

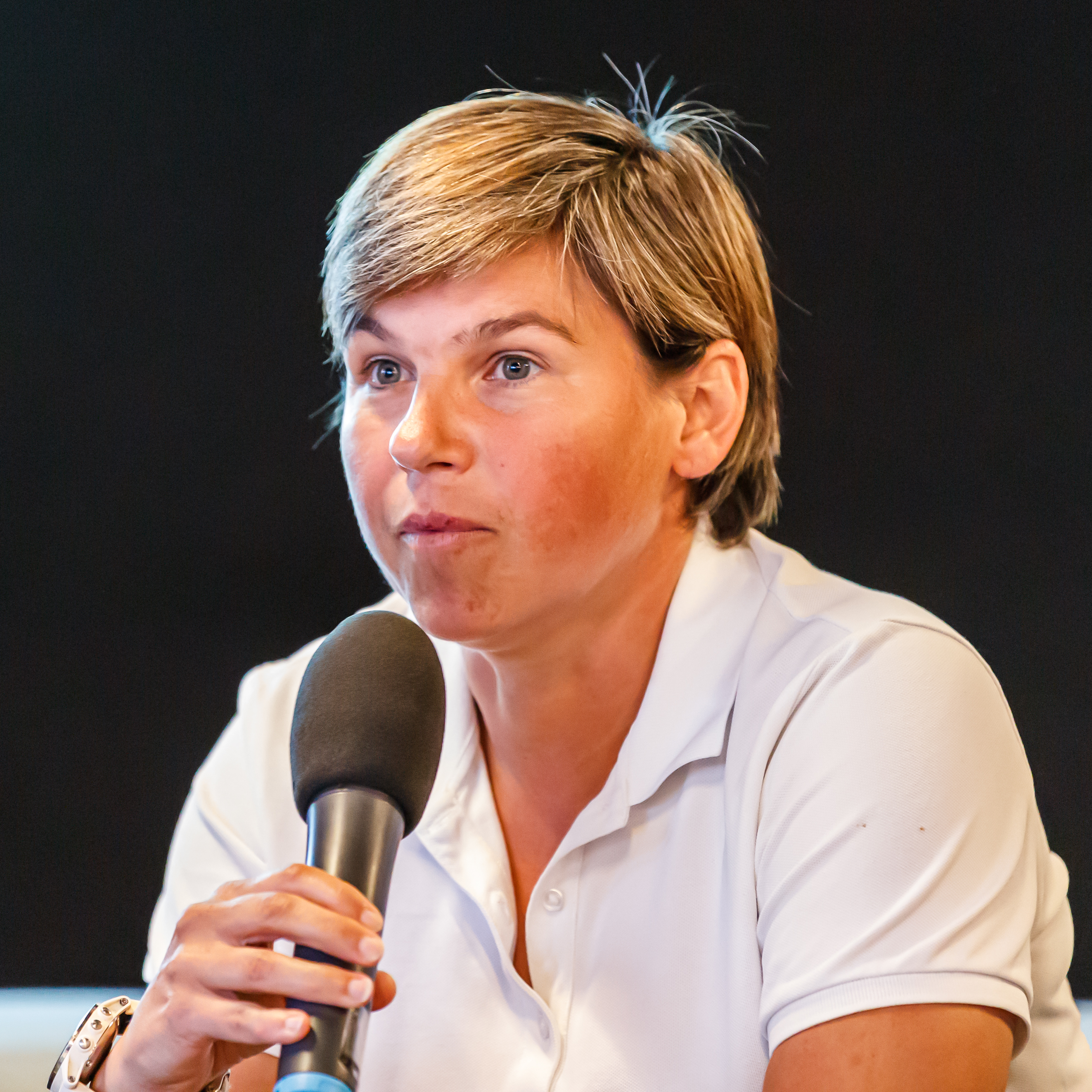

Personal information
- Full name: Ariane Hingst
- Date of birth: 25 July 1979 (age 47)
- Place of birth: West Berlin, West Germany
- Height: 1.70 m (5 ft 7 in)
- Positions: Defender; midfielder

Youth career
- 1986–1992: Hertha Zehlendorf
- 1992–1994: Lichterfelder FC

Senior career*
Years	Team	Apps	(Gls)
1994–1997	Hertha Zehlendorf		
1997–2007	1. FFC Turbine Potsdam	183	(53)
2007–2008	Djurgårdens IF	36	(7)
2009–2011	1. FFC Frankfurt	34	(6)
2011–2012	Newcastle Jets	10	(0)
2012–2013	Canberra United	12	(1)

International career
1996–2011	Germany	173	(10)
Medal record
Women's football
Representing Germany
FIFA Women's World Cup
Gold medal – first place	2003 United States	Team
Gold medal – first place	2007 China	Team
Olympic Games
Bronze medal – third place	2000 Sydney	Team
Bronze medal – third place	2004 Athens	Team
Bronze medal – third place	2008 Beijing	Team
UEFA Women's Championship
Gold medal – first place	1997 Norway/Sweden	Team
Gold medal – first place	2001 Germany	Team
Gold medal – first place	2005 England	Team
Gold medal – first place	2009 Finland	Team
- * Club domestic league appearances and goals

Ariane Hingst (born 25 July 1979) is a German former footballer who works as an analyst for Fox Sports. She was primarily utilized as a defender or a defensive midfielder.

== Club career ==
Hingst had played at several local clubs at junior level. At age 15, she played for the first team of Hertha Zehlendorf in the Regionalliga, then the second-highest division in Germany. In 1996 and 1997, Hingst won the league with Zehlendorf, but they failed to win their promotion play-offs both years. At that time, Germany's head coach Tina Theune had urged her to play at Bundesliga level, if she wanted to continue her international career.

Hingst joined newly promoted Bundesliga side Turbine Potsdam for the 1997–98 season. From 2001 to 2003, Potsdam was runner-up in the Bundesliga for three years in a row. Hingst won the Bundesliga title with Potsdam in 2004 and 2006, and claimed the German Cup competition from 2004 to 2006 three consecutive times. In the 2004–05 season, Potsdam also won the UEFA Women's Cup.

In 2007, Hingst moved to the Swedish first division side Djurgårdens IF Dam, where she played for two years, finishing runner-up in the league both seasons. She returned to Germany in 2009, joining 1. FFC Frankfurt. In her third season at the club, she won the 2011 German Cup. It was announced after Germany's poor 2011 FIFA Women's World Cup campaign, that she would leave 1. FFC Frankfurt. In October 2011 she signed to Australian club Newcastle Jets FC. On 29 August 2012, she signed for W-League side Canberra United.

== International career ==
Hingst made her debut for the Germany national team in August 1996 against the Netherlands. One year later, she won her first international title at the 1997 European Championship. The final against Italy was her only game in the starting line-up. At the 1999 FIFA Women's World Cup, Hingst was Germany's youngest player in the squad, yet she started in all matches and scored one goal in a group match. The team was eliminated in the quarter-finals. At the 2000 Summer Olympics, Hingst won bronze with the German team. She scored after 88 minutes in the final first round match against Sweden, which secured Germany's first place in the group.

Hingst again won the European Championship in 2001, which was played on home soil in Germany. However, she was only used sparely and did not appear in the final of the tournament. Hingst was part of Germany's winning squad at the 2003 FIFA Women's World Cup, starting in all matches for Germany. One year later, she went on to win the bronze medal at the Summer Olympics, and in 2005, she claimed her third European Championship. Hingst was one of the team's key players at Germany's successful title defence at the 2007 FIFA Women's World Cup. Alongside Kerstin Stegemann, Annike Krahn and Linda Bresonik, she was part of Germany's defence which did not concede a single goal in the entire tournament.

One year later, she won her third bronze medal at the 2008 Summer Olympics and she was part of the team to win Germany's seventh title at the European Championship. Hingst was also called up for Germany's 2011 FIFA Women's World Cup squad. She announced her retirement from international football following the tournament as Germany's third most capped player with 173 appearances.

== International goals ==
No.	Date	Venue	Opponent	Score	Result	Competition
1.	29 September 1996	Koblenz, Germany	Iceland	2–0	4–0	UEFA Women's Euro 1997 qualifying
2.	29 September 1996	Koblenz, Germany	Iceland	4–0	4–0	UEFA Women's Euro 1997 qualifying
3.	28 June 1998	Chicago, United States	United States	2–4	2–4	Friendly
4.	24 June 1999	Portland, United States	Mexico	3–0	6–0	1999 FIFA Women's World Cup
5.	17 AUgust 2000	Kópavogur, Iceland	Iceland	2–0	6–0	UEFA Women's Euro 2001 qualifying
6.	19 September 2000	Melbourne, Australia	Sweden	1–0	1–0	2000 Summer Olympics
7.	23 January 2002	Guangzhou, China	China	1–2	1–2	2002 Four Nations Tournament
8.	1 March 2002	Portimão, Portugal	Denmark	1–0	3–0	2002 Algarve Cup
9.	15 November 2003	Reutlingen, Germany	Portugal	12–0	13–0	UEFA Women's Euro 2005 qualifying
10.	29 May 2008	Kassel, Germany	Wales	1–0	4–0	UEFA Women's Euro 2009 qualifying

== Honours ==
Turbine Potsdam

- UEFA Women's Cup: 2004–05
- Bundesliga: 2003–04, 2005–06
- DFB-Pokal: 2003–04, 2004–05, 2005–06

1. FFC Frankfurt

- DFB Pokal: 2010–11

Germany

- FIFA World Cup: 2003, 2007
- UEFA European Championship: 1997, 2001, 2005, 2009
- Olympic bronze medal: 2000, 2004, 2008

Individual

- Silbernes Lorbeerblatt: 2007
- FIFA Women's World Cup All Star Team: 2007
