= Louise Hansen =

Danish footballer (born 1975)

Personal information
- Date of birth: 4 May 1975 (age 51)
- Place of birth: Hørsholm, Denmark
- Position: Defender

Senior career*
Years	Team	Apps	(Gls)
1995–1996	TSV Siegen		
1996–2000	Sportfreunde Siegen		
2000–2008	1. FFC Frankfurt		

International career
1995–2007	Denmark	98	(5)
- * Club domestic league appearances and goals

Louise Hansen (born 4 May 1975) is a Danish retired football player. She is considered the most successful Danish woman footballer ever.

She played for Hillerød GI and Rødovre BK in Denmark. In 1995, she started playing for German club TSV Siegen, transferring to rival team 1. FFC Frankfurt in the summer 2001. With Frankfurt she won six German Bundesliga championships, four German Cup trophies, and three UEFA Women's Cups. She ended her footballing career in the summer 2008 after increasing injury problems, in order to concentrate on a career in marketing.

She played 98 games for the Denmark national team from February 1995 to August 2007, and participated in the 1995 and 1999 FIFA World Cups and the 1997 and 2005 UEFA European Championships.

Since the 2006 World Cup, she has led and managed "Girls Wanted", an initiative aimed at attracting girls to football, in cooperation with 1. FFC Frankfurt and the Frankfurt Stadtwerke Verkehrsgesellschaft.

== Honours ==
- German Bundesliga: 2001, 2002, 2003, 2005, 2008
- German Cup: 2001, 2002, 2003, 2008
- UEFA Women's Cup: 2002, 2006, 2008
