= Sandra de Pol =

Swiss footballer (born 1975)

Personal information
- Date of birth: 7 May 1975 (age 51)
- Place of birth: Switzerland
- Height: 1.76 m (5 ft 9 in)
- Position: Defender

Senior career*
Years	Team	Apps	(Gls)
1991–1995	Malters		
1995–1996	Blue Stars		
1996–1998	Brewton-Parker		
1998–2000	TuS Niederkirchen	15	(5)
2000–2012	Bayern Munich	223	(19)
2012–2013	Bayern Munich II	6	(3)

International career
1992–1996	Switzerland		
- * Club domestic league appearances and goals

Sandra de Pol is a Swiss former footballer who played as a defender for Bayern Munich in the Frauen-Bundesliga. She also played for FC Malters and Blue Stars Zürich in the Swiss Nationalliga, Brewton-Parker College in the NAIA and TuS Niederkirchen in the Bundesliga.

She was a member of the Switzerland national team in the 1990s.
