= Karin Danner =

German footballer and manager

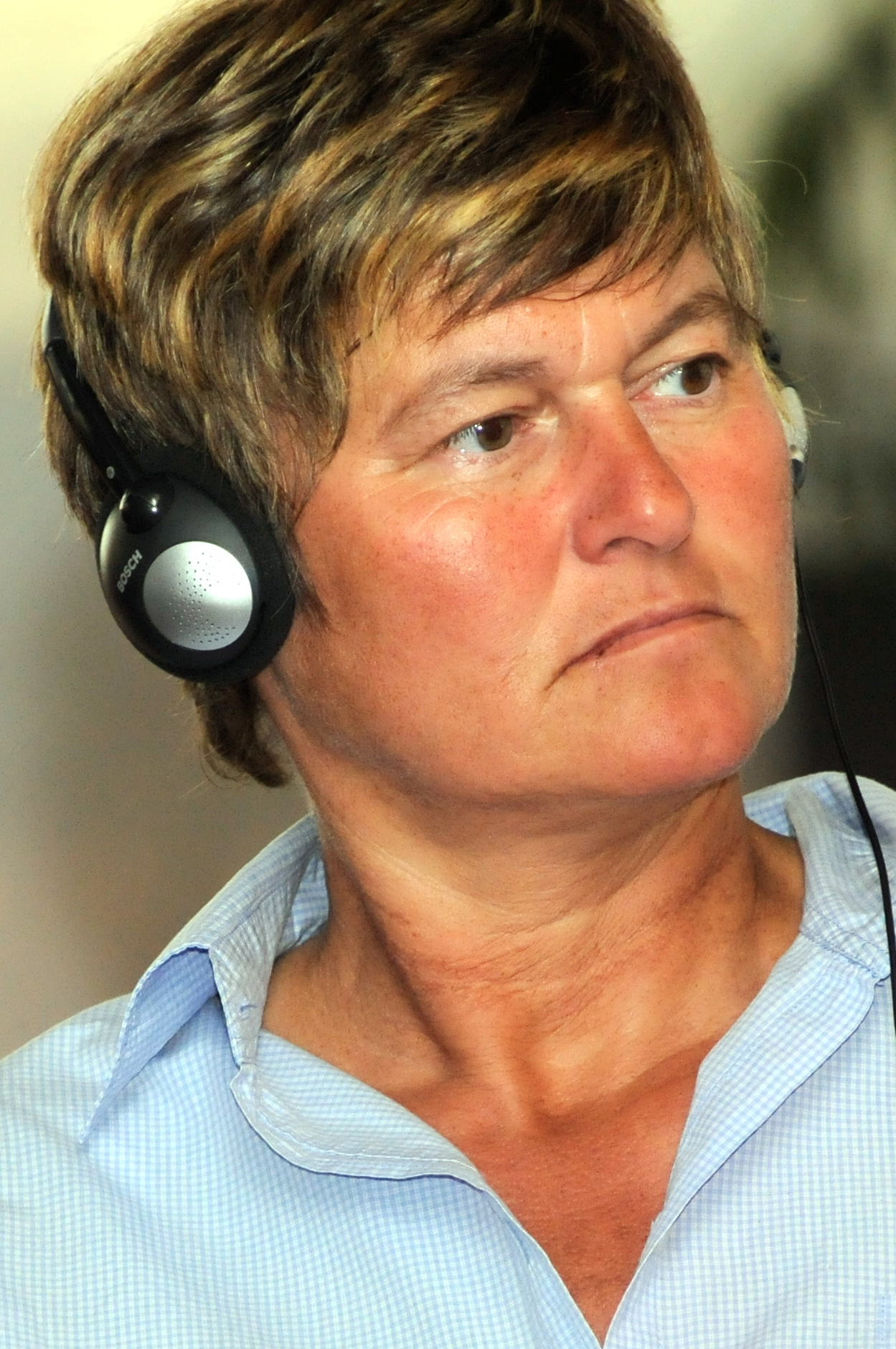
- Karin Danner in 2011

Personal information
- Date of birth: 22 January 1959 (age 67)
- Place of birth: Marnheim, West Germany
- Position: Midfielder

Senior career*
Years	Team	Apps	(Gls)
1975–1977	TuS Wörrstadt		
1977–1984	Bayern Munich		
1984–1988	TSV Obertaufkirchen		
1988–1993	Bayern Munich		

International career
1984	Germany	1	(0)
- * Club domestic league appearances and goals

Karin Danner (born 22 January 1959) is a German former footballer and former football manager.

She was the head of the women's football department of Bayern Munich from 1995 until the end of the 2022–23 season.

On club level, Danner played for TuS Wörrstadt and Bayern Munich. She was twice a German championship runners-up (1979 and 1982) with the Bayern team.

In May 1984, Danner appeared once in the Germany women's national football team in a friendly match against Norway.
