= Sandra Albertz =

German footballer

Personal information
- Date of birth: 25 January 1975 (age 51)
- Height: 1.61 m (5 ft 3 in)
- Position: Forward

Senior career*
Years	Team	Apps	(Gls)
1999–2000	FCR Duisburg 55		
2000–2001	FFC Brauweiler Pulheim		
2001–2003	FSV Frankfurt		
2003–2006	1. FFC Frankfurt		
2006–2007	SC 07 Bad Neuenahr		
- * Club domestic league appearances and goals

Sandra Albertz (born 25 January 1975) is a retired German football striker.

She won the 2005–06 UEFA Women's Cup with 1. FFC Frankfurt.
