= FFC Flaesheim-Hillen =

- Founded: 1999
- Dissolved: 2001
- League: Defunct

FFC Flaesheim-Hillen was a short-lived women's football club from the Flaesheim district of Haltern am See in the Ruhr area. The club was founded in 1999 as a merger of the women's football departments of SG Rot-Weiß Hillen and Concordia Flaesheim. As Rot-Weiß had achieved promotion for the Bundesliga the team was qualified for Germany's premier football league in their first season. Flaesheim finished eighth in 1999–2000 and improved their performance to a fifth place in 2000–01. They reached the final of the cup as well, but nevertheless had to declare bankruptcy at the end of the season.

After the dissolution of the club a new women's department was founded at Concordia Flaesheim. The team had to start in the lowest division, but has since managed promotion to the fourth-tier Verbandsliga.

== Seasons ==
Season	League	Place	W	D	L	GF	GA	Pts	DFB-Pokal
1999–00	Bundesliga (I)	8	6	2	14	23	74	20	1st round
2000–01	Bundesliga	5	9	6	7	30	25	33	Runner-up
