= Patrizia Barucha =

German footballer

Personal information
- Date of birth: 7 April 1983 (age 43)
- Height: 1.62 m (5 ft 4 in)
- Position: Forward

Senior career*
Years	Team	Apps	(Gls)
1999–2002	FSV Frankfurt		
2002–2004	1. FFC Frankfurt		
2004–2005	FSV Frankfurt		
2005–2006	1. FFC Frankfurt		
2006–2013	1. FFC Frankfurt II		
2013–2014	Eintracht Frankfurt		
- * Club domestic league appearances and goals

Patrizia Barucha (born 7 April 1983) is a retired German football striker.

She won the 2005–06 UEFA Women's Cup with 1. FFC Frankfurt. She was also a squad member for the 2002 UEFA Women's Under-19 Championship.
