= Élodie Woock =

French footballer (born 1976)

Personal information
- Date of birth: 13 January 1976 (age 50)
- Place of birth: Mont-Saint-Aignan, France
- Height: 1.61 m (5 ft 3 in)
- Position: Midfielder

Senior career*
Years	Team	Apps	(Gls)
1994–2002	Toulouse		
2002–2003	Frankfurt		
2003–2004	Toulouse	20	(6)

International career
1995–2004	France	78	(3)

Managerial career
- 2009–2010: Toulouse (B)
- 2010–: Saint-Simon
- * Club domestic league appearances and goals

Élodie Woock (born 13 January 1976) is a French former football midfielder. She played for Toulouse FC in the French First Division and 1.FFC Frankfurt in the German Bundesliga, and was a member of the France national team for most of her career, taking part in the 1997 and 2001 European Championships and the 2003 World Cup.

Now as a manager, she currently coaches ES Saint-Simon in the French Third Division.

== Titles ==
- 4 French Leagues (1999, 2000, 2001, 2002)
- 1 French Cup (2002)
- 1 German League (2003)
- 1 German Cup (2003)
