= Altenkirchener SG =

German football club

- Full name: Altenkirchener Sportgemeinschaft 1883 e.V.
- Nickname(s): ASG
- Founded: 1909
- Ground: Schul- und Sportzentrum Altenkirchen
- Chairman: Friedhelm Hermes
- Manager: Torsten Gerhardt
- League: Rheinlandliga (VI)
- 2015–16: 12th
Home colours	Away colours

Altenkirchener SG is a German football club from the city of Altenkirchen, Rhineland-Palatinate. The club was founded in 1909 as Sportverein Altenkirchen and in 1919 joined the gymnastics club Turnverein 1883 Altenkirchen which had established its own football department on 5 July 1883.

== History ==
In 1922 the footballers went their own way as SV Altenkirchen before the club was lost in 1925. The former membership reorganized themselves as Sportfreunde Altenkirchen on 12 November 1927 and in August 1931 merged with SV Helmenzen to become Sportvereinigung Altenkirchen-Helmenzen. Within a year that club in turn merged with the railway workers club Reichsbahn-SV Altenkirchen to form Reichsbahn-TSV Altenkirchen.

In March 1937 TSV was united with TV 1883 Altenkirchen to play as Turn- und Reichsbahn Sportverein 1883 ALtenkirchen before being joined with another railworkers side, Reichsbahn-SG. The club was lost after World War II when occupying Allied authorities banned most organizations across the country, including sports and football clubs. It was re-established on 25 June 1947 as Altenkirchener 1883 SG.

In the 1960s SG made single season appearances in third division play in the Amateurliga Rheinland (1964–65, 1967–68).

Since then, it has slipped to lower amateur division play. In 2010–11, it competed in the tier eight Kreisliga A Westerwald/Sieg, finishing 12th. Following this, the club took up an on-the-field union with SG Neitersen/Altenkirchen which now plays in the Rheinlandliga after promotion from the Bezirksliga in 2015.

== Honours ==
- Rhineland Cup
  - Runners-up: 2014
- Bezirksliga Rheinland-Ost
  - Champions: 2015
