= FFC Heike Rheine =

- Full name: Frauenfußballclub Heike Rheine e.V.
- Founded: 10 March 1998
- Dissolved: 30 September 2016
- Ground: Jahnstadion, Rheine
- Capacity: 10,500
Home colours	Away colours

FFC Heike Rheine was a German women's football club based in Rheine, North Rhine-Westphalia. Heike Rheine was the first independent women's football club in Germany.

== History ==
The club has its origins at the VfB Rheine. They had played on a local level until 1986 when Alfred Werner took over the head of the women's section. Two consecutive promotions in 1988 and 1989 took the club to the Regionalliga (West), then Germany's top football league for women. A second place in their first season 1989–90 qualified Heike Rheine for the newly founded Bundesliga. In 1992 and 1993 they finished 3rd in their group of the league and reached the semifinals of the cup. In 1994 VfB Rheine merged with SG Eintracht Rheine, naming itself FC Eintracht Rheine. The following years Rheine repeatedly finished 4th in the league thus qualifying for the single-division Bundesliga at its introduction in 1997 while being runner-up in the cup the same year.

On 10 March 1998, the women's section split from the club, becoming independent under the name FFC Heike Rheine. The club was relegated the same year, but managed re-promotion in the following year. In 2004 the club had its greatest success, finishing 3rd in the league and providing the league's top scorer Kerstin Garefrekes. At the end of the season Garefrekes left for 1. FFC Frankfurt. When other top players had left the club in the following years, Rheine was relegated to the 2. Bundesliga in 2007. The relegation triggered the leaving of further core players, leading to a second consecutive relegation in 2008. Rheine continued its decline, and after playing below the top two leagues for eight seasons the club dissolved on 30 September 2016.

== Statistics ==
Season	League	Place	W	D	L	GF	GA	Pts	DFB-Cup
1990–91	Bundesliga Nord (I)	5	8	3	7	29	34	19	not qualified
1991–92	Bundesliga Nord	3	12	4	4	42	17	28	Semi-final
1992–93	Bundesliga Nord	3	10	2	6	35	21	22	Semi-final
1993–94	Bundesliga Nord	4	7	5	6	31	20	19	Quarter-final
1994–95	Bundesliga Nord	4	7	6	5	38	24	20	3rd round
1995–96	Bundesliga Nord	4	9	5	4	38	24	32	Quarter-final
1996–97	Bundesliga Nord	4	9	4	5	30	24	31	Runner-up
1997–98	Bundesliga (I)	7	9	2	11	28	32	29	Quarter-final
1998–99	Bundesliga	11	6	4	12	29	44	22	Quarter-final
1999–00	Regionalliga West (II)	1	21	1	0	113	12	64	2nd round
2000–01	Bundesliga	11	5	5	12	28	52	20	2nd round
2001–02	Bundesliga	8	6	9	7	34	34	27	2nd round
2002–03	Bundesliga	4	12	2	8	52	31	38	2nd round
2003–04	Bundesliga	3	13	4	5	64	37	43	Semi-final
2004–05	Bundesliga	7	7	4	11	36	54	25	Quarter-final
2005–06	Bundesliga	9	5	5	12	39	56	20	3rd round
2006–07	Bundesliga	11	4	2	16	24	57	14	2nd round
2007–08	2. Bundesliga Nord (II)	12	3	4	15	26	50	13	2nd round
2008–09	Regionalliga West (III)	11	8	6	12	37	53	30	1st round
2009–10	Regionalliga West	6	11	5	10	48	34	38	not qualified
2010–11	Regionalliga West	-	0	0	0	0	0	0	not qualified
Green marks a season followed by promotion, red a season followed by relegation.
