= 2003–04 Frauen-Bundesliga =

Frauen-Bundesliga
- Season: 2003–04
- Champions: Turbine Potsdam; 1st Bundesliga title 1st German title
- Relegated: Brauweiler Pulheim; Saarbrücken
- UEFA Cup: Turbine Potsdam
- Goals: 560
- Average goals/game: 4.24
- Top goalscorer: (Germany) Kerstin Garefrekes (26)
- Biggest home win: 11–0 FFC Frankfurt v Saarbrücken
- Biggest away win: 1–9 Wolfsburg v Potsdam
- Highest scoring: 11–0 FFC Frankfurt v Saarbrücken, 5–6 Brauweiler Pulheim v Heike Rheine
- Longest unbeaten run: Frankfurt (23), Day 1–23
- Longest losing run: Saarbrücken (18), Day 1–18
- Highest attendance: 4,800 FFC Frankfurt v Potsdam
- Lowest attendance: 50 Saarbrücken v Freiburg
- Average attendance: 532

The 2003–04 Frauen-Bundesliga was the 14th season of the Frauen-Bundesliga, Germany's premier football league. It began on 17 August 2003 and ended on 13 June 2004.

1. FFC Turbine Potsdam won its first national championship. The deciding match for the season's title happened on the last match day, when leading Potsdam met Frankfurt, who stood unbeaten in place 2. Frankfurt needed a win to surpass Potsdam, but failed to do so, receiving their only defeat that season with a 2–7.

== Final standings ==
Pos	Team	Pld	W	D	L	GF	GA	GD	Pts	Relegation
1	1. FFC Turbine Potsdam	22	20	1	1	96	17	+79	61	2003–04 Bundesliga (women) champions
2	1. FFC Frankfurt (Note: 2002–03 Bundesliga (women) champion)	22	18	3	1	68	19	+49	57	
3	FFC Heike Rheine	22	13	4	5	64	37	+27	43	
4	FCR 2001 Duisburg	22	11	2	9	57	38	+19	35	
5	FC Bayern Munich	22	10	4	8	53	36	+17	34	
6	Hamburger SV (Note: Promoted from the 2. Bundesliga (women) last season)	22	10	4	8	47	34	+13	34	
7	SC 07 Bad Neuenahr	22	8	4	10	40	48	−8	28	
8	VfL Wolfsburg	22	8	3	11	35	55	−20	27	
9	FSV Frankfurt	22	6	3	13	29	53	−24	21	
10	SC Freiburg	22	5	5	12	34	51	−17	20	
11	FFC Brauweiler Pulheim	22	3	6	13	30	57	−27	15	Will be relegated to the 2. Bundesliga (women)
12	1. FC Saarbrücken	22	0	1	21	7	115	−108	1	Will be relegated to the 2. Bundesliga (women)

== Results ==
Home \ Away	POT	FRA	HRH	DUI	FCB	HSV	NEU	WOF	FSV	FRE	BRP	SAR
1. FFC Turbine Potsdam		0–3	4–1	3–1	2–1	3–0	3–2	9–1	6–0	6–0	1–0	7–0
1. FFC Frankfurt	2–7		3–2	2–0	1–0	3–0	4–1	3–0	2–0	3–1	6–1	5–0
FFC Heike Rheine	3–3	0–1		1–4	3–1	2–2	7–0	3–1	3–1	1–1	6–5	5–0
FCR 2001 Duisburg	0–3	2–4	1–2		2–3	3–2	4–1	1–1	2–2	5–2	3–1	8–0
FC Bayern Munich	1–8	1–1	4–0	3–0		1–3	1–4	2–0	2–3	2–3	1–1	3–0
Hamburger SV	0–2	1–3	0–2	0–3	1–1		2–0	2–2	2–0	3–1	5–0	3–0
SC 07 Bad Neuenahr	0–8	0–0	0–3	1–3	1–2	2–0		5–0	1–0	2–1	1–1	7–0
VfL Wolfsburg	0–6	0–3	1–4	1–0	1–1	2–7	1–2		3–2	0–4	4–0	4–0
FSV Frankfurt	1–5	0–3	0–3	3–2	0–6	0–1	2–2	1–4		1–3	0–0	2–1
SC Freiburg	1–6	2–2	2–2	1–3	2–4	1–5	3–0	0–1	0–2		1–1	1–1
FFC Brauweiler Pulheim	0–3	1–3	1–5	2–3	0–6	2–2	1–1	0–2	1–3	1–0		4–0
1. FC Saarbrücken	0–1	0–11	2–6	0–7	0–7	1–6	0–7	0–4	1–6	0–4	1–7	

Legend: Blue = home team win; Yellow = draw; Red = away team win.

== Top scorers ==
	Player	Team	Goals
1	(Germany) Kerstin Garefrekes	FFC Heike Rheine	26
2	(Germany) Birgit Prinz	1. FFC Frankfurt	19
3	(Germany) Conny Pohlers	1. FFC Turbine Potsdam	18
