= 2000–01 Frauen-Bundesliga =

Frauen-Bundesliga
- Season: 2000–01
- Champions: Frankfurt; 2nd Bundesliga title 2nd German title
- Relegated: Flaesheim-Hillen; Siegen
- UEFA Cup: Frankfurt
- Goals: 486
- Average goals/game: 3.68
- Top goalscorer: (Germany) Birgit Prinz (24)

The 2000–01 Frauen-Bundesliga was the 11th season of the Frauen-Bundesliga, Germany's premier football league. It began on 15 October 2000 and ended on 10 June 2001.

== Final standings ==
Sportfreunde Siegen did not receive a license for 2001–02 to play in the Bundesliga. Flaesheim retired voluntarily from the Bundesliga. Therefore, Heike Rheine and 1. FC Saarbrücken remained in the league.

Pos	Team	Pld	W	D	L	GF	GA	GD	Pts	Relegation
1	FFC Frankfurt	22	17	3	2	81	17	+64	54	2000–01 Bundesliga (women) champions
2	Turbine Potsdam	22	13	5	4	63	17	+46	44	
3	FCR Duisburg (Note: 1999–2000 Bundesliga (women) champion)	22	12	4	6	43	39	+4	40	
4	Brauweiler Pulheim	22	12	1	9	56	32	+24	37	
5	Flaesheim-Hillen	22	9	6	7	30	25	+5	33	Will be relegated to the 2. Bundesliga (women)
6	Bayern Munich (Note: Promoted from the 2. Bundesliga (women) last season)	22	10	3	9	45	52	−7	33	
7	FSV Frankfurt	22	7	7	8	28	37	−9	28	
8	Sportfreunde Siegen	22	7	5	10	28	46	−18	26	Will be relegated to the 2. Bundesliga (women)
9	SC 07 Bad Neuenahr	22	7	5	10	36	55	−19	26	
10	WSV Wendschott	22	5	5	12	30	48	−18	20	
11	Heike Rheine	22	5	5	12	28	52	−24	20	
12	1. FC Saarbrücken	22	2	3	17	18	66	−48	9	

== Results ==
Home \ Away	FRA	POT	DUI	BRP	FFC	FCB	FSV	SFS	NEU	WSV	HRH	SAR
FFC Frankfurt		0–2	4–0	5–1	2–0	5–0	3–0	2–2	5–0	6–0	3–1	3–0
Turbine Potsdam	1–1		1–1	2–0	0–1	4–1	1–1	9–0	7–0	5–0	2–0	6–0
FCR Duisburg	0–2	1–0		0–7	2–1	3–1	2–1	1–4	2–2	0–0	3–2	7–1
Brauweiler Pulheim	5–2	0–2	2–3		1–0	0–1	0–1	2–1	5–1	1–1	6–1	3–0
Flaesheim-Hillen	3–3	0–0	2–1	1–0		1–4	1–1	0–0	0–1	3–0	3–0	3–0
Bayern Munich	0–5	2–1	3–4	3–5	1–3		1–2	4–1	4–2	2–1	1–1	2–1
FSV Frankfurt	1–3	1–3	0–2	1–7	3–1	1–1		1–0	3–2	1–1	1–3	5–1
Sportfreunde Siegen	0–6	0–6	0–0	0–2	2–0	2–3	1–1		1–2	2–2	2–0	3–0
SC 07 Bad Neuenahr	1–6	5–2	3–2	1–0	0–0	5–5	3–1	0–1		1–2	1–2	0–0
WSV Wendschott	0–4	2–4	2–3	3–2	1–2	2–3	0–1	1–2	4–1		2–1	0–0
Heike Rheine	0–4	1–1	1–3	1–4	1–1	3–2	1–1	2–1	1–1	2–5		3–2
1. FC Saarbrücken	0–7	0–4	0–3	2–3	2–4	0–1	0–0	2–3	2–4	2–1	3–1	

Legend: Blue = home team win; Yellow = draw; Red = away team win.

== Top scorers ==
Rank	Player	Team	Goals
1	(Germany) Birgit Prinz	FFC Frankfurt	24
2	(Germany) Conny Pohlers	Turbine Potsdam	23
3	(Germany) Claudia Müller	WSV Wendschott	18
