= Renate Lingor =

German footballer (born 1975)

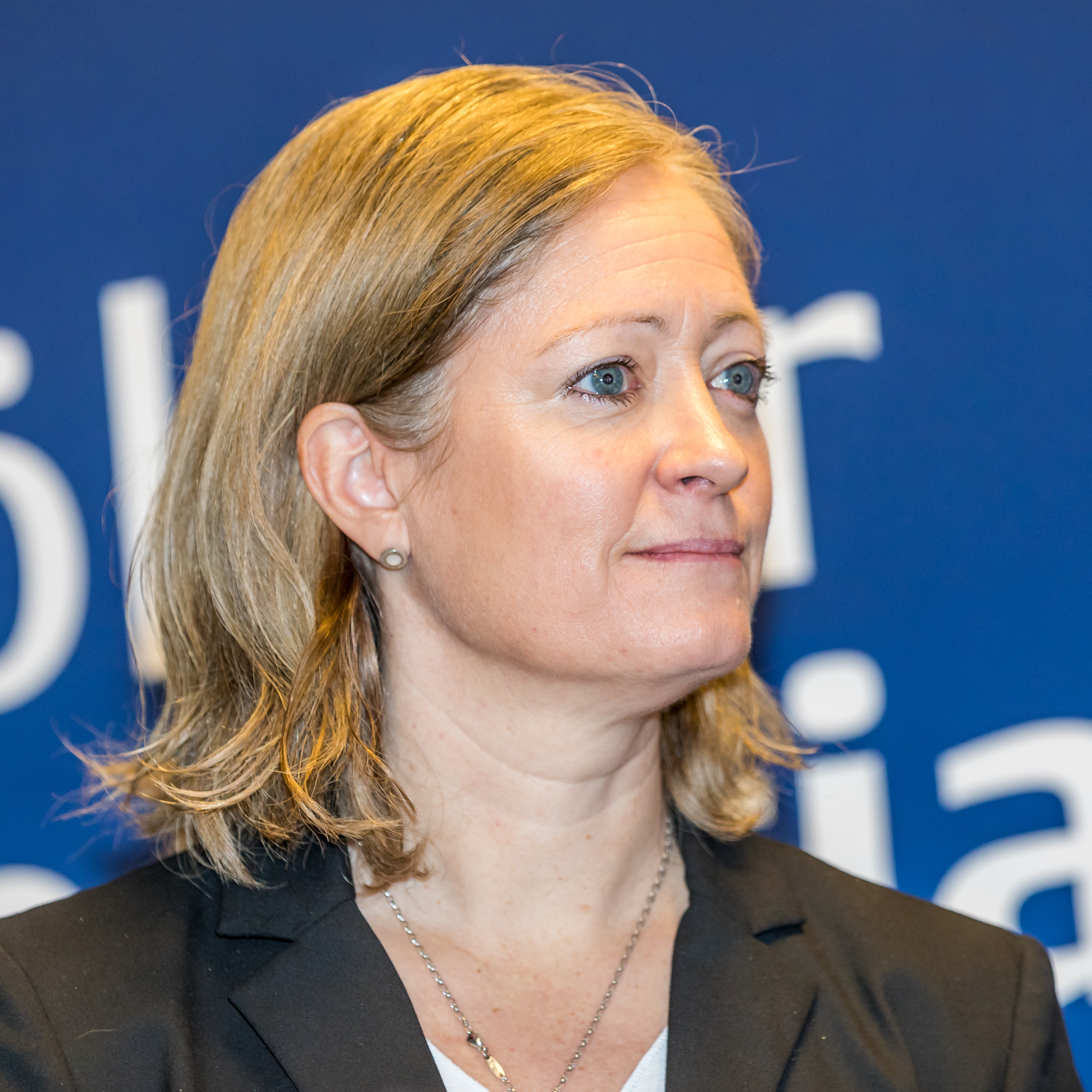
- Lingor in 2019

Personal information
- Full name: Renate Lingor
- Date of birth: 11 October 1975 (age 51)
- Place of birth: Karlsruhe, West Germany
- Height: 1.66 m (5 ft 5 1/2 in)
- Positions: Midfielder; striker

Youth career
- 1981–1983: SV Blankenloch
- 1983–1990: Karlsruher SC
- 1990–1991: SC Klinge Seckach

Senior career*
Years	Team	Apps	(Gls)
1991–1997	SC Klinge Seckach		
1997–2008	1.FFC Frankfurt		

International career
1995–2008	Germany	149	(35)
Medal record
Women's football
Representing Germany
FIFA Women's World Cup
Gold medal – first place	2003 United States	Team competition
Gold medal – first place	2007 China	Team competition
Olympic Games
Bronze medal – third place	2000 Sydney	Team Competition
Bronze medal – third place	2004 Athens	Team Competition
Bronze medal – third place	2008 Beijing	Team Competition
UEFA Women's Championship
Gold medal – first place	2001 Germany	Team competition
Gold medal – first place	2005 England	Team competition
- * Club domestic league appearances and goals

Renate Lingor (born 11 October 1975) is a German former international footballer, who played as a midfielder or forward.

== Club career ==
Lingor began her career in 1981 with SV Blankenloch at the age of six, in 1983 she joined the youth team of Karlsruher SC. Aged 14 she signed with SC Klinge Seckach where she started her professional career in German Bundesliga. Despite several offers from top German teams she remained there until 1997 when she joined 1. FFC Frankfurt. Lingor's position is in the central midfield. She is well known for her good technique, her ability to read a game and her free kicks. She has retired after the 2007–08 season.

== International career ==
Before her first appearance in the German national team in 1995 Lingor made 19 games for the Under 20 Team. Since then she has been constantly part of the team that won several international titles. Her goal against Sweden at the 2004 Olympics secured the bronze medal for her team. In 2006 Renate Lingor was nominated as FIFA Women's World Player of the Year together with Marta (Brazil) and Kristine Lilly (USA). Lingor announced, that she would retire after the 2008 Olympic Games.

== Style of play ==
Lingor usually played in the number 10 role in midfield behind the forwards, although she was also used in a more attacking role on occasion, or even in a deeper role in front of the defence. In 2007, a FIFA.com profile described her with the following words: "She moves around the pitch with lithe elegance, is technically brilliant and has excellent vision. She can dummy and feint past almost anyone and is lethal from set pieces – so much so that she is often compared in her homeland with top playmakers from the men's game like Mehmet Scholl and Thomas Hassler. And with good reason. Lingor, who stands 1.66 m (5 ft 5 in) tall, is as consistently exceptional as her now retired male counterparts." The profile also praised her for creativity and playmaking skills, lauding her as a "master of the defence-splitting pass," while also noting her work-rate, stating: "Lingor is not only a creative outlet just behind the front two but also capable of working in front of the defence to break up opposition play and then launch lightning-quick counter-attacks."

== Career statistics ==
=== Clubs ===
- FFC Frankfurt
- SC Klinge-Seckach
- DFC Eggenstein
- Karlsruher SC
- SV Blankenloch.

== International goals ==
No.	Date	Venue	Opponent	Score	Result	Competition
1.	24 June 1999	Portland, United States	Mexico	5–0	6–0	1999 FIFA Women's World Cup
2.	13 September 2000	Canberra, Australia	Australia	3–0	3–0	2000 Summer Olympics
3.	28 September 2000	Sydney, Australia	Brazil	1–0	2–0	2000 Summer Olympics
4.	30 June 2001	Jena, Germany	England	3–0	3–0	UEFA Women's Euro 2001
5.	3 March 2002	Vila Real de Santo António, Portugal	China	2–2	2–4	2002 Algarve Cup
6.	7 May 2002	Barcelos, Portugal	Portugal	2–0	8–0	2003 FIFA Women's World Cup qualification
7.	7 May 2002	Barcelos, Portugal	Portugal	5–0	8–0	2003 FIFA Women's World Cup qualification
8.	15 November 2003	Reutlingen, Germany	Portugal	11–0	13–0	UEFA Women's Euro 2005 qualifying
9.	7 February 2004	Albufeira, Portugal	Portugal	5–0	11–0	UEFA Women's Euro 2005 qualifying
16.	11 August 2004	Patras, Greece	China	6–0	8–0	2004 Summer Olympics
17.	26 August 2004	Piraeus, Greece	Sweden	1–0	1–0	2004 Summer Olympics
18.	30 January 2005	Guangzhou, China	Russia	1–0	1–0	2005 Four Nations Tournament
19.	1 February 2005	Guangzhou, China	China	2–0	2–0	2005 Four Nations Tournament
20.	12 June 2005	Warrington, England	France	2–0	3–0	UEFA Women's Euro 2005
21.	19 June 2005	Blackburn, England	Norway	2–0	3–1	UEFA Women's Euro 2005
22.	25 September 2005	Siegen, Germany	Russia	1–0	5–1	2007 FIFA Women's World Cup qualification
23.	30 August 2006	Schaffhausen, Switzerland	Switzerland	4–0	6–0	2007 FIFA Women's World Cup qualification
24.	23 September 2006	Perth, Scotland	Scotland	2–0	5–0	2007 FIFA Women's World Cup qualification
30.	7 March 2007	Faro, Portugal	Norway	1–1	1–2	2007 Algarve Cup
31.	10 September 2007	Shanghai, China	Argentina	6–0	11–0	2007 FIFA Women's World Cup
32.	10 September 2007	Shanghai, China	Argentina	11–0	11–0	2007 FIFA Women's World Cup
33.	17 September 2007	Hangzhou, China	Japan	2–0	2–0	2007 FIFA Women's World Cup
34.	22 September 2007	Wuhan, China	North Korea	2–0	3–0	2007 FIFA Women's World Cup
35.	7 March 2008	Faro, Portugal	Finland	3–0	3–0	2008 Algarve Cup

== Honours ==
1. FFC Frankfurt

- UEFA Women's Champions League: Winner 2002, 2006, 2008
- Bundesliga: Winner 1999, 2001, 2002, 2003, 2005, 2007, 2008
- DFB-Pokal: Winner 1999, 2000, 2001, 2002, 2003, 2007, 2008
- DFB-Hallenpokal for women: Winner 1997, 1998, 1999, 2002, 2006, 2007

Germany

- FIFA Women's World Cup: Winner 2003, UEFA Women's, 2007
- UEFA Women's Championship: Winner 2001, 2005
- Football at the Summer Olympics: Bronze medal 2000, 2004, 2008

Individual

- 2007 FIFA Women's World Cup All star team
