= Jennifer Meier =

German footballer

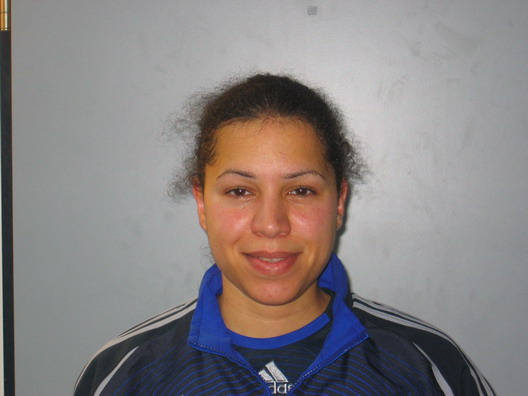

Personal information
- Date of birth: 13 April 1981 (age 45)
- Place of birth: Worms, Germany
- Height: 1.66 m (5 ft 5 in)

Youth career
- VfR Bürstadt

Senior career*
Years	Team	Apps	(Gls)
2000–2003	1. FFC Frankfurt		
2003	Washington Freedom		
2003–2005	FSV Frankfurt		
2006–2007	QBIK		
2008–2009	Djurgårdens IF	39	(3)
2010–2011	Bollstanäs SK		

International career
	Germany	7	(0)
- * Club domestic league appearances and goals

Jennifer Meier (born 13 April 1981) is a German former footballer who played as a striker. She was capped seven times for the Germany national team.

Meier started her career in VfR Bürstadt. She played for 1. FFC Frankfurt, Washington Freedom, and FSV Frankfurt. After that, Meier played in Sweden for QBIK Karlstad. In 2008, she joined Djurgårdens IF and made 39 Damallsvenskan appearances (three goals) in the 2008 and 2009 seasons. After a spell with Bollstanäs SK she retired from football in 2012 and settled in Sweden.
