= 2001–02 Frauen-Bundesliga =

Frauen-Bundesliga
- Season: 2001–02
- Champions: Frankfurt; 3rd Bundesliga title 3rd German title
- Relegated: Hamburg; Saarbrücken
- UEFA Cup: Frankfurt
- Goals: 472
- Average goals/game: 3.58
- Top goalscorer: (Germany) Conny Pohlers (27)

The 2001–02 Frauen-Bundesliga was the 12th season of the Frauen-Bundesliga, Germany's premier football league. It began on 19 August 2001 and ended on 16 June 2002.

== Final standings ==
Pos	Team	Pld	W	D	L	GF	GA	GD	Pts	Relegation
1	1. FFC Frankfurt (Note: 2000–01 Bundesliga (women) champion)	22	18	4	0	65	17	+48	58	2001–02 Bundesliga (women) champions
2	1. FFC Turbine Potsdam	22	14	2	6	56	23	+33	44	
3	FCR 2001 Duisburg	22	14	2	6	61	34	+27	44	
4	FC Bayern Munich	22	12	4	6	59	38	+21	40	
5	FSV Frankfurt	22	11	6	5	48	29	+19	39	
6	SC Freiburg (Note: Promoted from the 2. Bundesliga (women) last season)	22	11	2	9	30	34	−4	35	
7	FFC Brauweiler Pulheim	22	10	3	9	37	27	+10	33	
8	FFC Heike Rheine	22	6	9	7	34	34	0	27	
9	SC 07 Bad Neuenahr	22	6	4	12	24	51	−27	22	
10	WSV Wendschott	22	5	2	15	26	52	−26	17	
11	Hamburger SV	22	2	2	18	16	62	−46	8	Will be relegated to the 2. Bundesliga (women)
12	1. FC Saarbrücken	22	2	2	18	16	71	−55	8	Will be relegated to the 2. Bundesliga (women)

== Results ==
Home \ Away	FRA	POT	DUI	FCB	FSV	FRE	BRP	HRH	NEU	WSV	HSV	SAR
1. FFC Frankfurt		4–1	2–1	3–1	1–0	1–1	3–1	2–1	4–1	3–1	2–0	7–0
1. FFC Turbine Potsdam	1–3		2–0	4–0	4–0	0–1	1–0	3–1	1–2	3–1	0–0	8–2
FCR 2001 Duisburg	1–7	1–2		3–6	2–1	4–1	3–0	4–0	6–1	5–0	5–1	3–0
FC Bayern Munich	1–3	1–2	2–3		1–1	1–2	3–2	5–5	5–1	4–1	3–0	3–1
FSV Frankfurt	1–1	3–1	3–0	2–2		4–1	3–1	1–1	2–2	4–2	4–0	6–1
SC Freiburg	1–2	0–6	0–1	1–1	1–2		0–5	2–1	1–0	3–1	5–0	2–0
FFC Brauweiler Pulheim	0–0	1–0	2–3	1–3	2–1	2–1		1–2	0–0	2–0	5–0	3–1
FFC Heike Rheine	1–1	0–0	0–3	1–3	1–1	2–0	0–0		5–1	0–0	2–1	4–0
SC 07 Bad Neuenahr	1–7	1–3	2–2	0–3	2–1	1–2	1–0	0–0		1–0	4–3	0–1
WSV Wendschott	0–2	0–5	2–2	1–4	1–2	0–3	1–3	1–4	4–0		3–0	3–0
Hamburger SV	2–4	1–4	0–4	1–5	1–4	0–2	0–3	1–3	1–4	4–0		3–0
1. FC Saarbrücken	0–3	1–5	0–5	0–2	1–2	0–1	1–4	2–2	0–3	2–3	1–1	

Legend: Blue = home team win; Yellow = draw; Red = away team win.

== Top scorers ==
Rank	Player	Team	Goals
1	(Germany) Conny Pohlers	Turbine Potsdam	27
2	(Germany) Melanie Hoffmann	FCR 2001 Duisburg	19
3	(Germany) Birgit Prinz	FFC Frankfurt	17
3	(Germany) Petra Unterbrink	Brauweiler Pulheim	17
