= Conny Pohlers =

German footballer (born 1978)

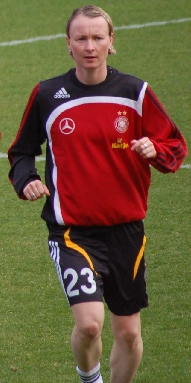
- Pohlers in 2008

Personal information
- Full name: Conny Pohlers
- Date of birth: 16 November 1978 (age 47)
- Place of birth: Halle, East Germany
- Position: Forward

Youth career
- 1985–1994: FSV 67 Halle

Senior career*
Years	Team	Apps	(Gls)
1994–1997	1. FFC Turbine Potsdam	1	(1)
1997	TuS Niederkirchen	4	(4)
1997–2007	1. FFC Turbine Potsdam	151	(171)
2003	Atlanta Beat		
2007–2011	1. FFC Frankfurt	59	(60)
2011–2014	VfL Wolfsburg	63	(41)
2013	→ Washington Spirit (loan)	13	(1)

International career
2001–2011	Germany	67	(28)
Medal record
Representing Germany
Women's Football
Bronze medal – third place	2004 Athens	Team competition
Bronze medal – third place	2008 Beijing	Team competition
- * Club domestic league appearances and goals

Conny Pohlers (born 16 November 1978) is a German former professional footballer who played as a forward. From 1998 she played in the Women's Bundesliga and from 2001 in the Germany national team.

== Club career ==
Born, Halle, Pohlers comes from a football playing family. Her father played and her mother was once the top goal scorer in a regional league. She first played at the age of seven with FSV '67 Halle. In 1994, she moved to 1. FFC Turbine Potsdam. In the 2003 season, she played in the American professional league, WUSA, with the Atlanta Beat. In February 2007 she announced that she would be transferring to 1.FFC Frankfurt for the 2007–08 season. In 2013, playing for VfL Wolfsburg, she again became a Bundesliga champion, and on 19 May she scored a goal in Wolfsburg's 3–2 Cup Final win against her old team, Turbine Potsdam.

After the 2013–14 season she ended her career.

== Honours ==
=== Club ===
- Bundesliga: 2004, 2006, 2008, 2013, 2014
- DFB-Pokal: 2004, 2005, 2006, 2008, 2011, 2013
- UEFA Women's Champions League 2005, 2008, 2013, 2014

=== International ===
- FIFA Women's World Cup: 2003
- Football at the Summer Olympics: Bronze medal 2004, 2008
- UEFA Women's Championship: 2005
- Algarve Cup: 2006

=== Individual ===
- Bundesliga top goal scorer 2002, 2006, 2011
- Third all-time top scorer UEFA Women's Champions League with 48 goals
- UEFA Women's Champions League top scorer: 2004–05

== International goals ==
No.	Date	Venue	Opponent	Score	Result	Competition
1.	25 October 2001	Wolfsburg, Germany	Portugal	1–0	9–0	2003 FIFA Women's World Cup qualification
2.	25 October 2001	Wolfsburg, Germany	Portugal	4–0	9–0	2003 FIFA Women's World Cup qualification
3.	25 October 2001	Wolfsburg, Germany	Portugal	6–0	9–0	2003 FIFA Women's World Cup qualification
4.	25 October 2001	Wolfsburg, Germany	Portugal	7–0	9–0	2003 FIFA Women's World Cup qualification
5.	25 October 2001	Wolfsburg, Germany	Portugal	8–0	9–0	2003 FIFA Women's World Cup qualification
6.	27 September 2003	Washington D.C., United States	Argentina	5–1	6–1	2003 FIFA Women's World Cup
7.	15 November 2003	Reutlingen, Germany	Portugal	10–0	13–0	UEFA Women's Euro 2005 qualifying
8.	15 November 2003	Reutlingen, Germany	Portugal	13–0	13–0	UEFA Women's Euro 2005 qualifying
9.	11 August 2004	Patras, Greece	China	6–0	8–0	2004 Summer Olympics
10.	20 August 2004	Patras, Greece	Nigeria	2–1	2–1	2004 Summer Olympics
11.	11 March 2005	Silves, Portugal	Norway	4–0	4–0	2005 Algarve Cup
12.	6 June 2005	Preston, England	Norway	1–0	1–0	UEFA Women's Euro 2005
13.	9 June 2005	Warrington, England	Italy	2–0	4–0	UEFA Women's Euro 2005
14.	15 June 2005	Preston, England	Finland	2–0	4–1	UEFA Women's Euro 2005
15.	9 March 2006	Algarve, Portugal	Finland	1–0	5–0	2006 Algarve Cup
16.	30 August 2006	Schaffhausen, Switzerland	Switzerland	1–0	6–0	2007 FIFA Women's World Cup qualification
17.	29 July 2007	Magdeburg, Germany	Denmark	4–0	4–0	Friendly
18.	7 May 2008	Eupen, Belgium	Belgium	1–0	5–0	UEFA Women's Euro 2009 qualifying
19.	7 May 2008	Eupen, Belgium	Belgium	3–0	5–0	UEFA Women's Euro 2009 qualifying
20.	29 May 2008	Kassel, Germany	Wales	2–0	4–0	UEFA Women's Euro 2009 qualifying
