= SC 07 Bad Neuenahr =

German football club

- Full name: Sportclub 07 Bad Neuenahr e.V.
- Founded: 1907
- Dissolved: 2013
- Ground: Apollinarisstadion
- Capacity: 4,580
Home colours	Away colours

SC 07 Bad Neuenahr was a German football club from Bad Neuenahr-Ahrweiler, Rhineland-Palatinate. The best-known section within the club was its women's football team, which was founded in 1969 and won the German Championship in 1978. Sportclub Bad Neuenahr was a founding member of Germany's women's Bundesliga and played in the top division from 1997 until 2013.

The men's side played second-division football in the first half of the 1950s as part of the 2. Liga-Südwest before slipping to the Amateurliga Rheinland in 1955. They generally earned upper table results there through the balance of the decade and on through the 1960s and 1970s. They took part in the opening round of the DFB-Pokal (German Cup) in 1975 when they were eliminated by FC St. Pauli. Their only other cup experience was in 1932 when they advanced to the quarter-final of the regional Westpokal.

After the club's longtime president and athletic director, Bernd Stemmeler died on 17 May 2013, on 27 May it filed for insolvency at the district court in Bad Neuenahr. A few weeks later, the club's management announced the voluntary withdrawal from the 2. Bundesliga and they subsequently liquidated. As a replacement, in the 2013–14 season a new club, SC 13 Bad Neuenahr was founded and entered the 2. Bundesliga South, carrying that name at beginning of the second half of the season.

== Last squad ==
Note: Flags indicate national team as defined under FIFA eligibility rules; some limited exceptions apply. Players may hold more than one non-FIFA nationality.

No.	Pos.	Nation	Player
3	DF	GER	Laura Störzel
4	DF	GER	Melanie Eminger
5	DF	GER	Antonia Hornberg
6	MF	GER	Jessica Bade
8	FW	GER	Shelley Thompson
9	FW	GER	Nicole Rolser
11	MF	GER	Nadine Rolser
12	FW	GER	Lisa Umbach
14	FW	GER	Marie Pyko
15	MF	GER	Maren Weingarz
16	GK	GER	Elena Bläser
17	MF	GER	Rebecca Knaak

No.	Pos.	Nation	Player
18	FW	NZL	Sarah Gregorius
19	FW	NZL	Emma Kete
20	DF	GER	Leonie Maier
22	DF	GER	Rachel Rinast
23	FW	GER	Sofia Nati
24	MF	GER	Theresa Laux
25	MF	TUR	Aylin Yaren
26	FW	GER	Kathrin Becker
27	MF	GER	Anja Selensky
31	GK	POR	Neide Simoes
41	MF	GER	Larissa Mahn
