= 2006 UEFA Women's Cup final =

- Event: 2005–06 UEFA Women's Cup
| Turbine Potsdam | Frankfurt |
| (Germany) | (Germany) |
| 2 | 7 |

First leg
| Turbine Potsdam | Frankfurt |
| 0 | 4 |
- Date: 20 May 2006
- Venue: Karl-Liebknecht-Stadion, Potsdam
- Referee: Eva Oedlun
- Attendance: 4,431

Second leg
| Frankfurt | Turbine Potsdam |
| 3 | 2 |
- Date: 27 May 2006
- Venue: Stadion am Bornheimer Hang, Frankfurt
- Referee: Dagmar Damkova
- Attendance: 13,200

The 2006 UEFA Women's Cup final was a two-legged final match played on 20 and 27 May 2006 between Turbine Potsdam and Frankfurt, both of Germany. This was the first final to be contested by teams of the same country. It was also the first ever final not to feature a Swedish team. Frankhurt won the final 7–2 on aggregate.

== Match details ==
=== First leg ===
20 May 2006
16:00 UTC+2

| Turbine Potsdam (Germany) | 0–4 | (Germany) Frankfurt |
|---|---|---|
| | Report | Lingor 7', 84'; Albertz 64'; Garefrekes 77' |

Karl-Liebknecht-Stadion, Potsdam
Attendance: 4,431
Referee: Eva Oedlund (Sweden)

| Turbine Potsdam | Frankfurt |

| GK | 25 | (Germany) Nadine Angerer |
| DF | 5 | (Germany) Babett Peter |
| DF | 8 | (Germany) Inken Becher |
| DF | 17 | (Germany) Ariane Hingst (c) |
| DF | 21 | (Germany) Peggy Kuznik |
| MF | 4 | (Germany) Britta Carlson | | (substituted off) 83' |
| MF | 6 | (Germany) Navina Omilade | (yellow card) 4' | (substituted off) 60' |
| MF | 14 | (Germany) Jennifer Zietz |
| FW | 9 | (Germany) Conny Pohlers |
| FW | 20 | (Germany) Petra Wimbersky |
| FW | 31 | (Germany) Anja Mittag |
Substitutes:
| GK | 23 | (Germany) Stephanie Ullrich |
| DF | 3 | (Germany) Monique Kerschowski |
| DF | 18 | (Germany) Josephine Schlanke |
| MF | 11 | (Germany) Carolin Schiewe |
| MF | 13 | (Germany) Juliane Höfler |
| MF | 19 | (Brazil) Cristiane | | (substituted on) 83' |
| FW | 12 | (Germany) Isabel Kerschowski | | (substituted on) 60' |
Manager:
Bernd Schröder

| GK | 24 | (Germany) Ursula Holl |
| DF | 3 | (Denmark) Louise Hansen |
| DF | 4 | (Germany) Nia Künzer |
| DF | 8 | (Germany) Tina Wunderlich | (yellow card) 49' | (substituted off) 81' |
| DF | 22 | (Germany) Steffi Jones |
| MF | 9 | (Germany) Birgit Prinz (c) | | (substituted off) 90+6' |
| MF | 10 | (Germany) Renate Lingor |
| MF | 11 | (Germany) Katrin Kliehm |
| MF | 21 | (Germany) Sandra Albertz | | (substituted off) 65' |
| FW | 18 | (Germany) Kerstin Garefrekes |
| FW | 28 | (Germany) Sandra Smisek |
Substitutes:
| GK | 29 | (Germany) Nicole Janischewski |
| DF | 14 | (Germany) Christina Zerbe |
| DF | 25 | (Germany) Saskia Bartusiak | | (substituted on) 65' |
| MF | 12 | (Germany) Meike Weber | | (substituted on) 81' |
| MF | 13 | (Germany) Sarah Günther |
| MF | 17 | (Germany) Judith Affeld |
| FW | 20 | (Germany) Patricia Barucha | | (substituted on) 90+6' |
Manager:
Hans-Jürgen Tritschoks

=== Second leg ===
27 May 2006
14:15 UTC+2

| Frankfurt (Germany) | 3–2 | (Germany) Turbine Potsdam |
|---|---|---|
| Jones 23'; Lingor 72' (pen.); Prinz 90+3' | Report | Pohlers 8', 35' |

Stadion am Bornheimer Hang, Frankfurt
Attendance: 13,200
Referee: Dagmar Damkova (Czech Republic)

| Frankfurt | Turbine Potsdam |

| GK | 24 | (Germany) Ursula Holl |
| DF | 3 | (Denmark) Louise Hansen |
| DF | 4 | (Germany) Nia Künzer |
| DF | 8 | (Germany) Tina Wunderlich |
| DF | 22 | (Germany) Steffi Jones |
| MF | 9 | (Germany) Birgit Prinz (c) |
| MF | 10 | (Germany) Renate Lingor |
| MF | 11 | (Germany) Katrin Kliehm |
| MF | 21 | (Germany) Sandra Albertz | (substituted off) 88' |
| FW | 18 | (Germany) Kerstin Garefrekes |
| FW | 28 | (Germany) Sandra Smisek | (substituted off) 88' |
Substitutes:
| GK | 1 | (Netherlands) Marleen Wissink |
| DF | 14 | (Germany) Christina Zerbe |
| DF | 25 | (Germany) Saskia Bartusiak |
| MF | 12 | (Germany) Meike Weber | (substituted on) 88' |
| MF | 13 | (Germany) Sarah Günther |
| MF | 17 | (Germany) Judith Affeld |
| FW | 20 | (Germany) Patricia Barucha | (substituted on) 88' |
Manager:
Hans-Jürgen Tritschoks

| GK | 25 | (Germany) Nadine Angerer |
| DF | 5 | (Germany) Babett Peter | (yellow card) 64' (red card) |
| DF | 8 | (Germany) Inken Becher | | (substituted off) 46' |
| DF | 17 | (Germany) Ariane Hingst (c) |
| DF | 21 | (Germany) Peggy Kuznik |
| MF | 4 | (Germany) Britta Carlson | | (substituted off) 46' |
| MF | 6 | (Germany) Navina Omilade |
| MF | 14 | (Germany) Jennifer Zietz | (yellow card) 6' |
| FW | 9 | (Germany) Conny Pohlers |
| FW | 20 | (Germany) Petra Wimbersky | | (substituted off) 79' |
| FW | 31 | (Germany) Anja Mittag |
Substitutes:
| GK | 23 | (Germany) Stephanie Ullrich |
| DF | 3 | (Germany) Monique Kerschowski | | (substituted on) 79' |
| DF | 18 | (Germany) Josephine Schlanke |
| MF | 11 | (Germany) Carolin Schiewe |
| MF | 19 | (Brazil) Cristiane | (yellow card) 69' | (substituted on) 46' |
| FW | 12 | (Germany) Isabel Kerschowski | | (substituted on) 46' |
| FW | 15 | (Albania) Aferdita Podvorica |
Manager:
Bernd Schröder
