= List of UEFA Women's Cup and Women's Champions League winning managers =

This is a list of UEFA Women's Cup and UEFA Women's Champions League winning football managers. German manager Monika Staab led Frankfurt to success in the inaugural UEFA Women's Cup final in 2002. German clubs and managers dominated the competition, winning seven of the tournaments since 2002.

The competition became the UEFA Women's Champions League in 2010, with German Bernd Schröder leading Turbine Potsdam to success that year.

Six managers have won the title on two occasions: Bernd Schröder, Hans-Jürgen Tritschoks and Ralf Kellermann with German teams, Patrice Lair, Gérard Prêcheur, and Reynald Pedros with French club, Lyon.

== By year ==
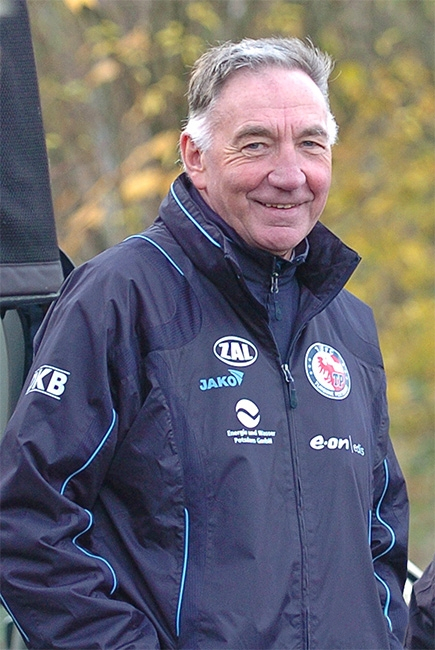
Bernd Schröder, winning manager in 2005 and 2010

| final | Nationality | Winning manager | Country | Club | Ref |
|---|---|---|---|---|---|
| 2002 | Germany | Monika Staab | Germany | Frankfurt | |
| 2003 | Sweden | Richard Holmlund | Sweden | Umeå | |
| 2004 | Sweden | Andrée Jeglertz | Sweden | Umeå | |
| 2005 | Germany | Bernd Schröder | Germany | Turbine Potsdam | |
| 2006 | Germany | Hans-Jürgen Tritschoks | Germany | Frankfurt | |
| 2007 | England | Vic Akers | England | Arsenal | |
| 2008 | Germany | Hans-Jürgen Tritschoks | Germany | Frankfurt | |
| 2009 | Germany | Martina Voss-Tecklenburg | Germany | Duisburg | |
| 2010 | Germany | Bernd Schröder | Germany | Turbine Potsdam | |
| 2011 | France | Patrice Lair | France | Lyon | |
| 2012 | France | Patrice Lair | France | Lyon | |
| 2013 | Germany | Ralf Kellermann | Germany | Wolfsburg | |
| 2014 | Germany | Ralf Kellermann | Germany | Wolfsburg | |
| 2015 | England | Colin Bell | Germany | Frankfurt | |
| 2016 | France | Gérard Prêcheur | France | Lyon | |
| 2017 | France | Gérard Prêcheur | France | Lyon | |
| 2018 | France | Reynald Pedros | France | Lyon | |
| 2019 | France | Reynald Pedros | France | Lyon | |
| 2020 | France | Jean-Luc Vasseur | France | Lyon | |
| 2021 | Spain | Lluís Cortés | Spain | Barcelona | |
| 2022 | France | Sonia Bompastor | France | Lyon | |
| 2023 | Spain | Jonatan Giráldez | Spain | Barcelona | |
| 2024 | Spain | Jonatan Giráldez | Spain | Barcelona | |
| 2025 | Netherlands | Renée Slegers | England | Arsenal | |
| 2026 | Spain | Pere Romeu | Spain | Barcelona | |

== Managers with multiple titles ==
| Rank | Nationality | Manager | Number of wins | Years won | Club(s) |
|---|---|---|---|---|---|
| 1 | Germany | **Bernd Schröder** | 2 | 2005, 2010 | Turbine Potsdam |
| 1 | Germany | Hans-Jürgen Tritschoks | 2 | 2006, 2008 | Frankfurt |
| 1 | France | Patrice Lair | 2 | 2011, 2012 | Lyon |
| 1 | Germany | **Ralf Kellermann** | 2 | 2013, 2014 | Wolfsburg |
| 1 | France | Gérard Prêcheur | 2 | 2016, 2017 | Lyon |
| 1 | France | **Reynald Pedros** | 2 | 2018, 2019 | Lyon |
| 1 | Spain | **Jonatan Giráldez** | 2 | 2023, 2024 | Barcelona |

Bold = Still active as manager

== By nationality ==
This table lists the total number of titles won by managers of each nationality.

| Nationality | Number of wins |
|---|---|
| Germany | 8 |
| France | 8 |
| Spain | 3 |
| Sweden | 2 |
| England | 2 |
