= The Best FIFA Football Awards 2017 =

International football awards

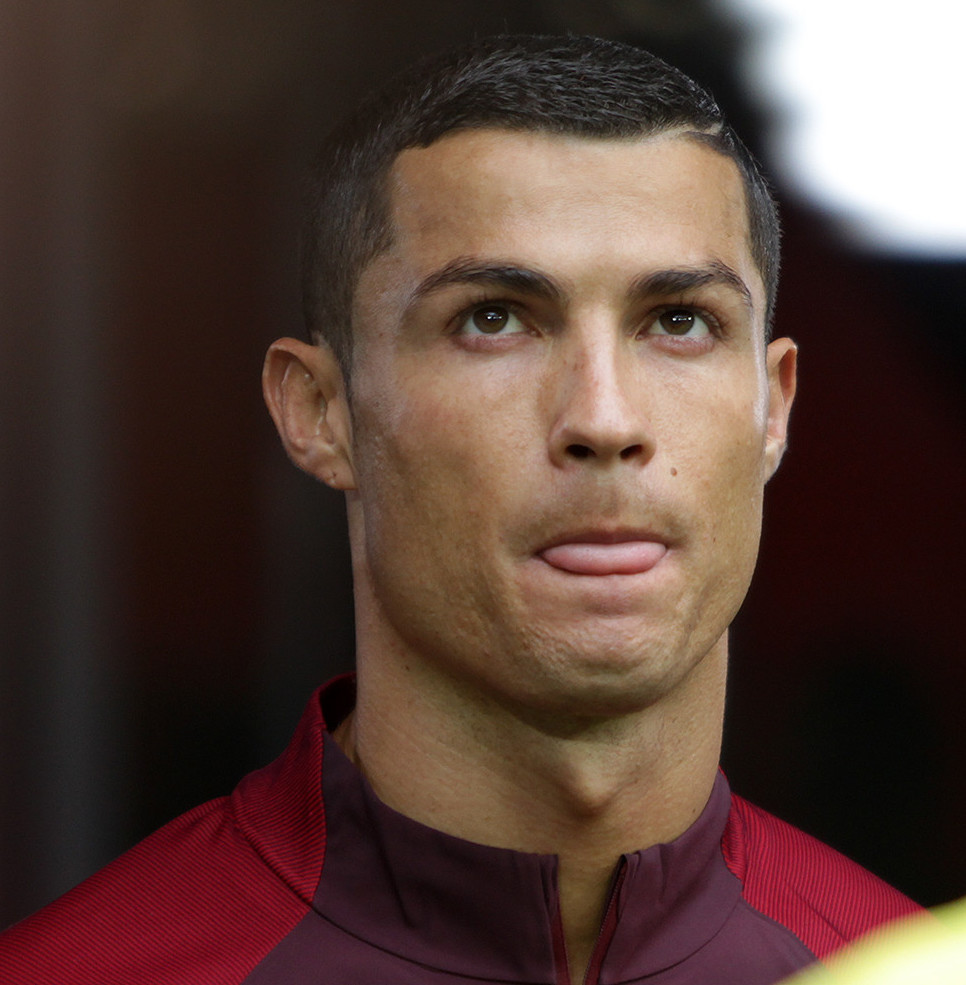
- Cristiano Ronaldo, The Best FIFA Men's Player 2017
- Date: 23 October 2017
- Location: London Palladium, London, United Kingdom
- Presented by: FIFA
- Hosted by: Idris Elba and Layla Anna-Lee

Highlights
- The Best FIFA Player: Men's: (Portugal) Cristiano Ronaldo; Women's: (Netherlands) Lieke Martens
- The Best FIFA Coach: Men's: (France) Zinedine Zidane; Women's: (Netherlands) Sarina Wiegman
- The Best FIFA Goalkeeper: (Italy) Gianluigi Buffon
- FIFA Puskás Award: (France) Olivier Giroud
- Website: fifa.com

The Best FIFA Football Awards 2017 were held on 23 October 2017 in London, United Kingdom. The ceremony was held at the London Palladium and was hosted by Idris Elba and Layla Anna-Lee. Cristiano Ronaldo, Lieke Martens, Gianluigi Buffon, Zinedine Zidane and Sarina Wiegman were among the award-winners.

== Winners and nominees ==
=== The Best FIFA Men's Player ===
A panel of experts on men's football representing various FIFA and external football stakeholders compiled a shortlist of 24 male players for The Best FIFA Men's Player. The 24 candidates were announced on 17 August. The three finalists were announced on 22 September 2017.

Cristiano Ronaldo won the award with over 43% of the vote.

The selection criteria for the men's players of the year were: sporting performance, as well as general conduct on and off the pitch from 20 November 2016 to 2 July 2017.

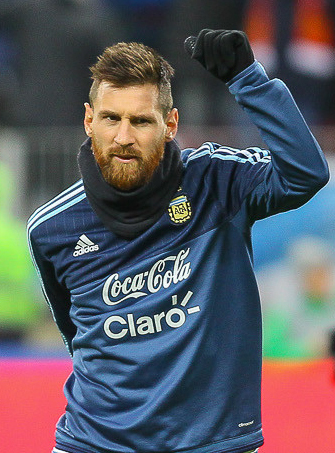
Lionel Messi

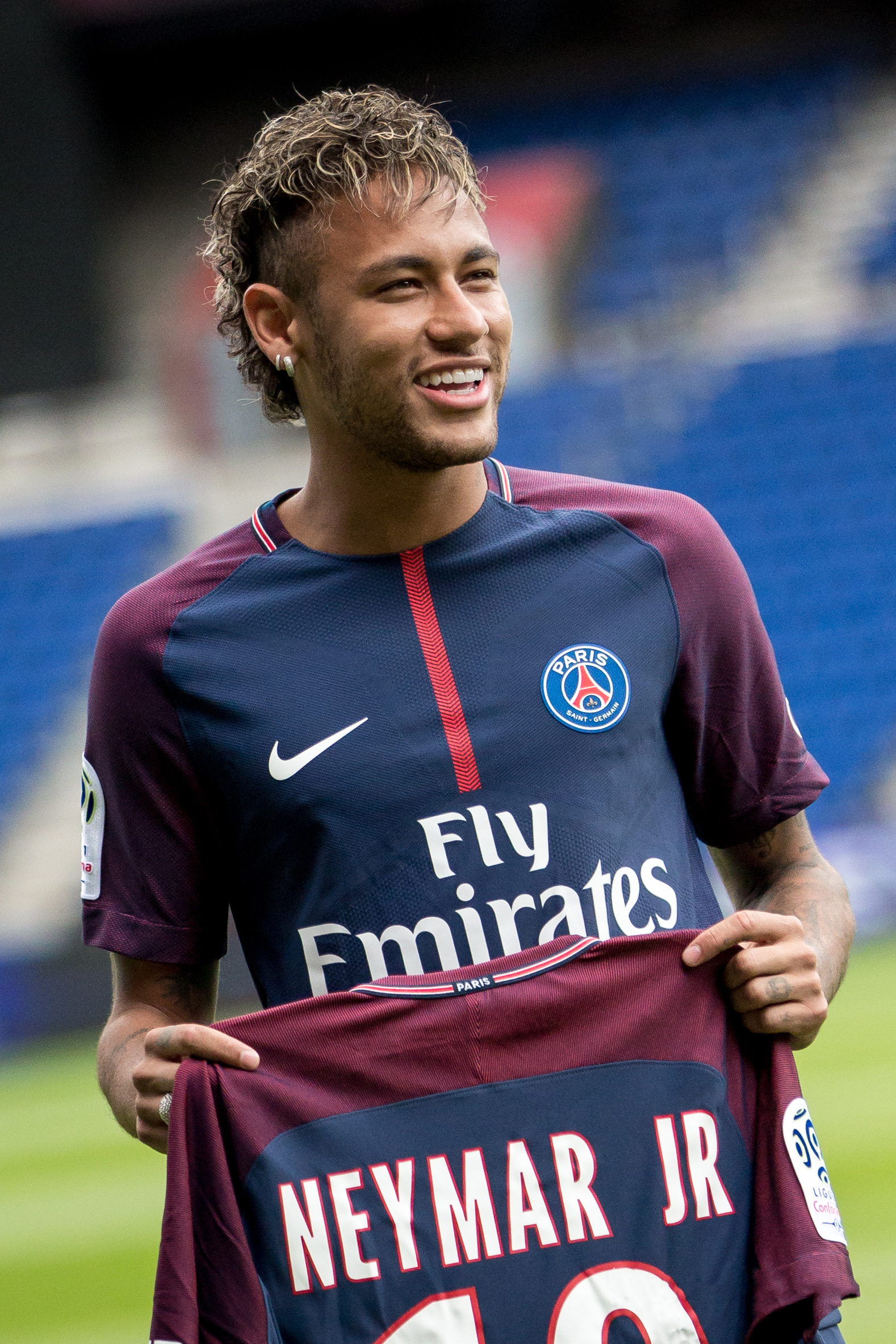
Neymar

Rank	Player	Club(s) played for	National team	Percent
The finalists
1	Cristiano Ronaldo	(Spain) Real Madrid	Portugal	43.16%
2	Lionel Messi	(Spain) Barcelona	Argentina	19.25%
3	Neymar	(Spain) Barcelona; (France) Paris Saint-Germain	Brazil	6.97%
Other candidates
4	Gianluigi Buffon	(Italy) Juventus	Italy	6.82%
5	Sergio Ramos	(Spain) Real Madrid	Spain	3.34%
6	Luka Modrić	(Spain) Real Madrid	Croatia	3.33%
7	Toni Kroos	(Spain) Real Madrid	Germany	2.70%
8	Marcelo	(Spain) Real Madrid	Brazil	2.09%
9	N'Golo Kanté	(England) Chelsea	France	1.35%
10	Luis Suárez	(Spain) Barcelona	Uruguay	1.19%
11	Pierre-Emerick Aubameyang	(Germany) Borussia Dortmund	Gabon	1.10%
12	Paulo Dybala	(Italy) Juventus	Argentina	1.07%
13	Eden Hazard	(England) Chelsea	Belgium	1.03%
14	Zlatan Ibrahimović	(England) Manchester United	Sweden	0.82%
15	Andrés Iniesta	(Spain) Barcelona	Spain	0.82%
16	Robert Lewandowski	(Germany) Bayern Munich	Poland	0.77%
17	Antoine Griezmann	(Spain) Atlético Madrid	France	0.67%
18	Dani Carvajal	(Spain) Real Madrid	Spain	0.62%
19	Manuel Neuer	(Germany) Bayern Munich	Germany	0.58%
20	Keylor Navas	(Spain) Real Madrid	Costa Rica	0.56%
21	Arturo Vidal	(Germany) Bayern Munich	Chile	0.51%
22	Leonardo Bonucci	(Italy) Juventus; (Italy) Milan	Italy	0.47%
23	Alexis Sánchez	(England) Arsenal	Chile	0.45%
24	Harry Kane	(England) Tottenham Hotspur	England	0.33%

=== The Best FIFA Goalkeeper ===
A panel of experts on football representing various FIFA and external football stakeholders compiled a shortlist of three goalkeepers for The Best FIFA Goalkeeper.

Gianluigi Buffon won the award with over 42% of the vote.

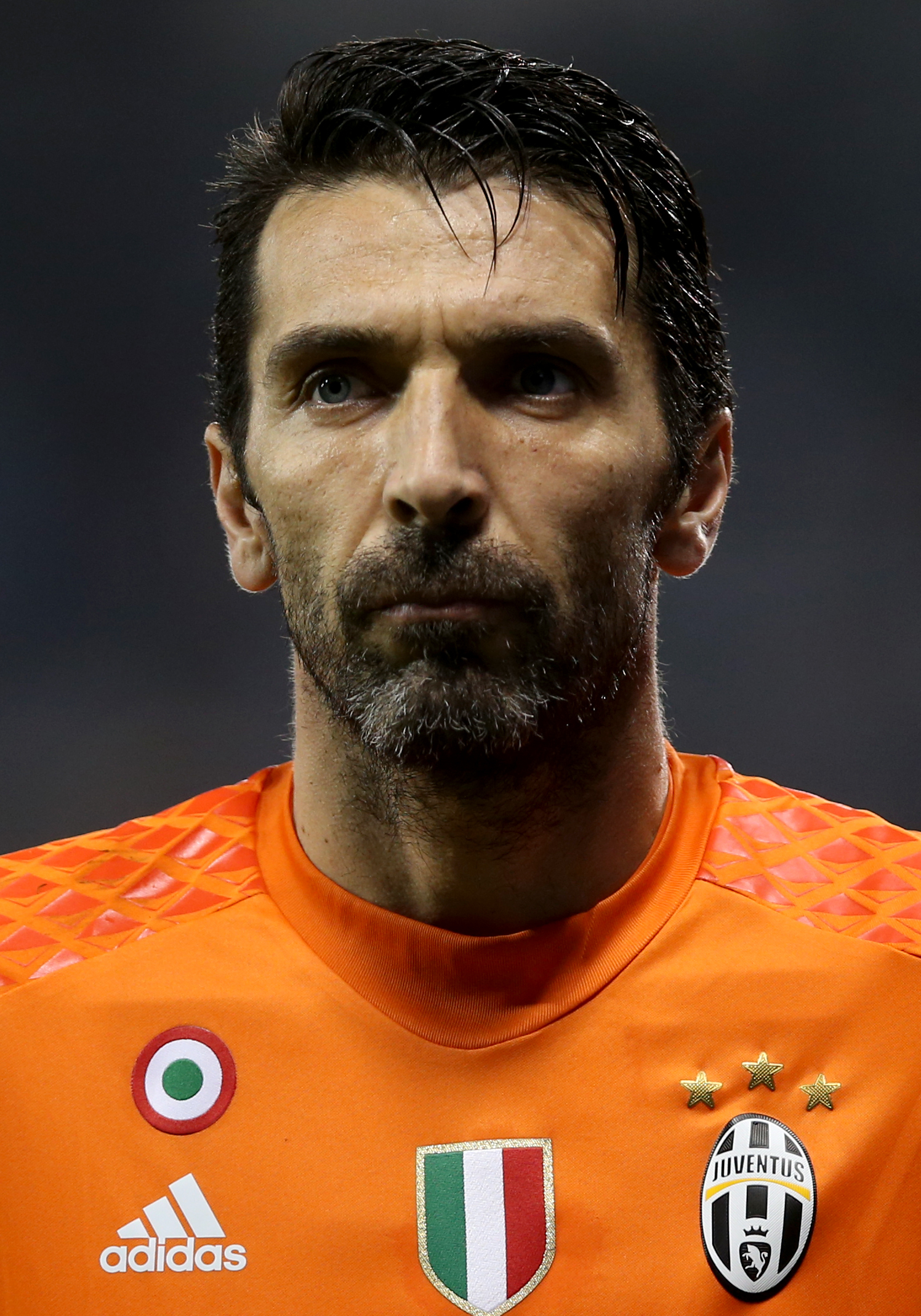
Gianluigi Buffon

The selection criteria for the men's football coaches of the year were: the best goalkeeper, regardless of championship or nationality, for his achievements during the period from 20 November 2016 to 2 July 2017 inclusive.

Rank	Player	Club(s) played for	National team	Percent
The finalists
1	Gianluigi Buffon	(Italy) Juventus	Italy	42.42%
2	Manuel Neuer	(Germany) Bayern Munich	Germany	32.32%
3	Keylor Navas	(Spain) Real Madrid	Costa Rica	10.10%
Other candidates
4	Thibaut Courtois	(England) Chelsea	Belgium	9.09%
5	Hugo Lloris	(England) Tottenham Hotspur	France	3.03%
6	Jan Oblak	(Spain) Atlético Madrid	Slovenia	2.02%
7	Marc-André ter Stegen	(Spain) Barcelona	Germany	1.01%
8	Alisson	(Italy) Roma	Brazil	0.01%
9	Alireza Beiranvand	(Iran) Persepolis	Iran	0.0%
9	Alfonso Blanco	(Mexico) Pachuca	Mexico	0.0%
9	Claudio Bravo	(England) Manchester City	Chile	0.0%
9	Gianluigi Donnarumma	(Italy) Milan	Italy	0.0%
9	Ederson	(Portugal) Benfica (England) Manchester City	Brazil	0.0%
9	Fabrice Ondoa	(Spain) Sevilla Atlético	Cameroon	0.0%
9	Danijel Subašić	(France) Monaco	Croatia	0.0%

=== The Best FIFA Men's Coach ===
A panel of experts on men's football representing various FIFA and external football stakeholders compiled a shortlist of twelve men's football coaches for The Best FIFA Men's Coach. The twelve candidates were announced on 17 August. The three finalists were announced on 22 September 2017.

Zinedine Zidane won the award with over 46% of the vote.

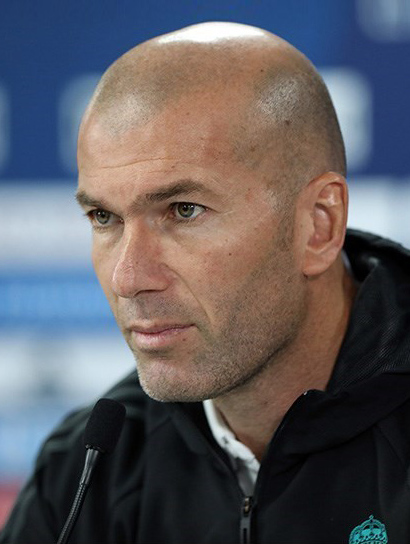
Zinedine Zidane

The selection criteria for the men's football coaches of the year were: performance and general behaviour of their teams on and off the pitch from 20 November 2016 to 2 July 2017.

Rank	Coach	Teams(s) managed	Percent
The finalists
1	(France) Zinedine Zidane	(Spain) Real Madrid	46.22%
2	(Italy) Antonio Conte	(England) Chelsea	11.62%
3	(Italy) Massimiliano Allegri	(Italy) Juventus	8.78%
Other candidates
4	(Germany) Joachim Löw	Germany	7.40%
5	(Portugal) José Mourinho	(England) Manchester United	5.28%
6	(Portugal) Leonardo Jardim	(France) Monaco	4.84%
7	(Italy) Carlo Ancelotti	(Germany) Bayern Munich	3.62%
8	(Spain) Pep Guardiola	(England) Manchester City	2.88%
9	(Brazil) Tite	Brazil	2.87%
10	(Argentina) Diego Simeone	(Spain) Atlético Madrid	2.77%
11	(Spain) Luis Enrique	(Spain) Barcelona	2.00%
12	(Argentina) Mauricio Pochettino	(England) Tottenham Hotspur	1.72%

=== The Best FIFA Women's Player ===
A panel of experts on women's football representing each of the six confederations selected a shortlist of ten female players for The Best FIFA Women's Player. The 10 candidates were announced on 17 August. The three finalists were announced on 22 September 2017.

Lieke Martens won the award with nearly 22% of the vote.

The selection criteria for the women's players of the year were: sporting performance, as well as general conduct on and off the pitch from 20 November 2016 to 6 August 2017.

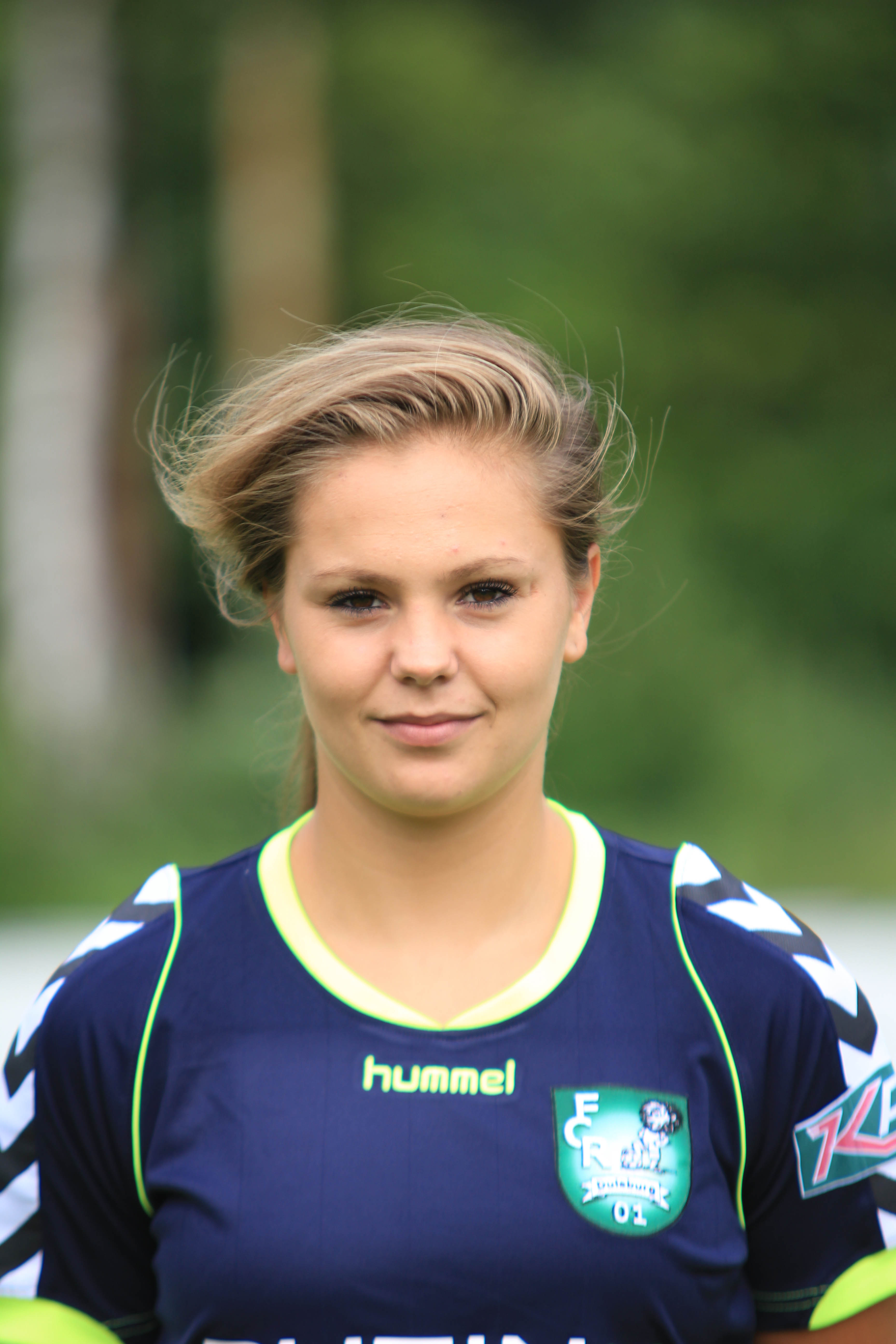
Lieke Martens

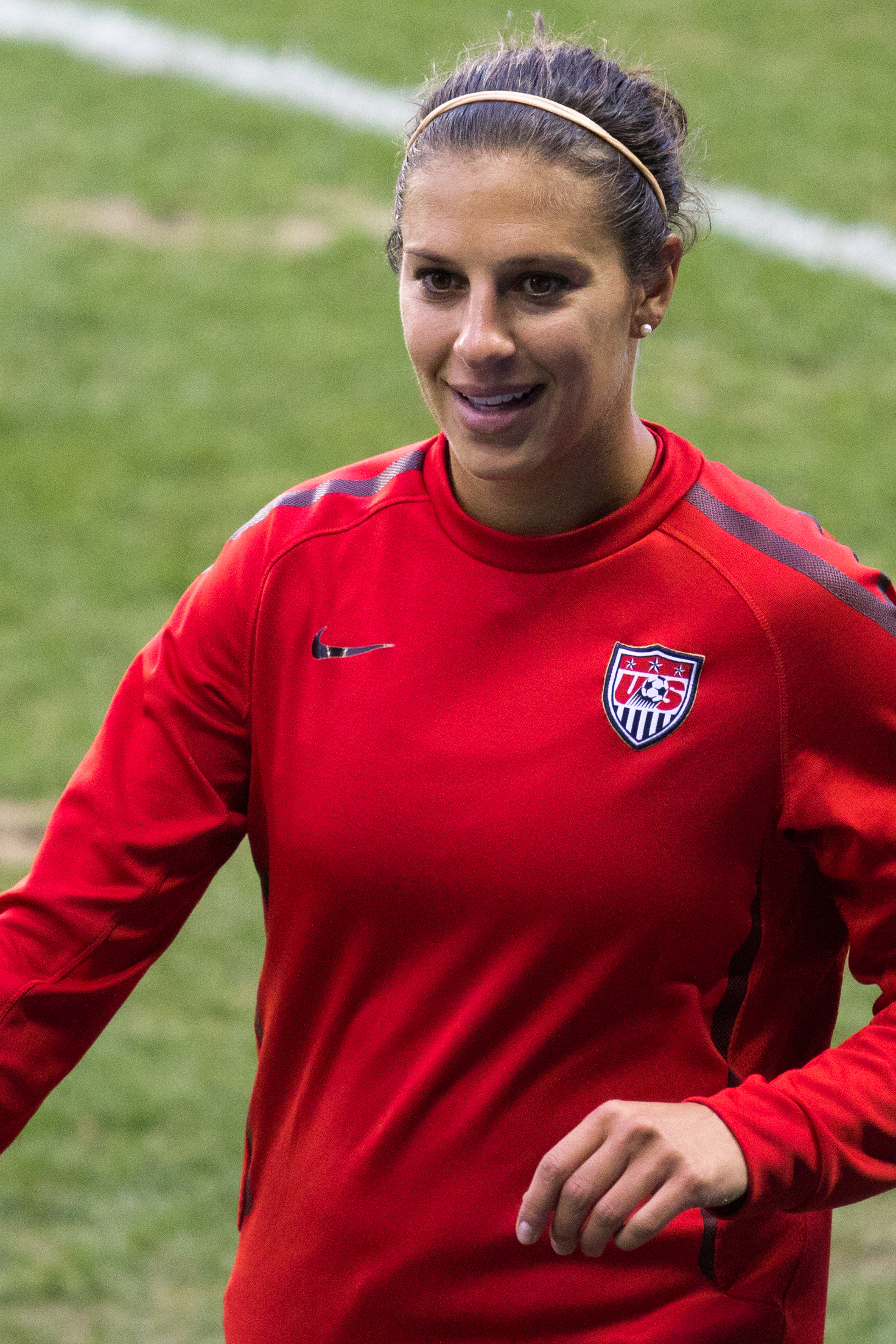
Carli Lloyd

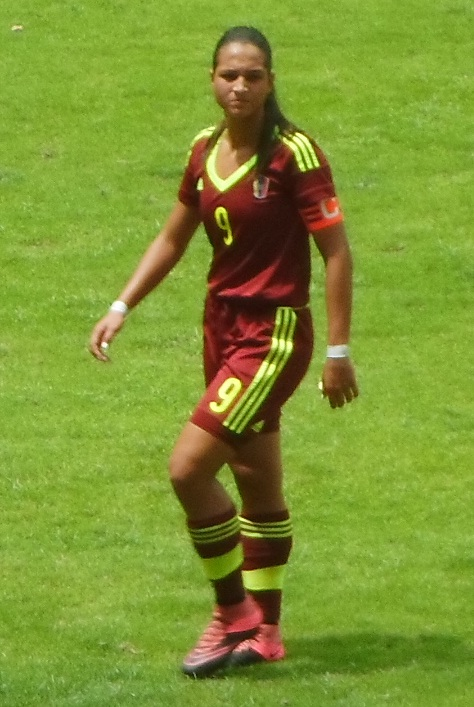
Deyna Castellanos

Rank	Player	Club(s) played for	National team	Percent
The finalists
1	Lieke Martens	(Sweden) FC Rosengård; (Spain) Barcelona	Netherlands	21.72%
2	Carli Lloyd	(United States) Houston Dash; (England) Manchester City	United States	16.28%
3	Deyna Castellanos	(United States) Florida State Seminoles; (United States) Santa Clarita Blue Heat	Venezuela	11.69%
Other candidates
4	Dzsenifer Marozsán	(France) Lyon	Germany	11.47%
5	Pernille Harder	(Sweden) Linköpings FC; (Germany) VfL Wolfsburg	Denmark	11.06%
6	Vivianne Miedema	(Germany) Bayern Munich; (England) Arsenal	Netherlands	6.28%
7	Wendie Renard	(France) Lyon	France	5.79%
8	Jodie Taylor	(England) Arsenal	England	5.79%
9	Lucy Bronze	(England) Manchester City	England	5.04%
10	Samantha Kerr	(Australia) Perth Glory; (United States) Sky Blue FC	Australia	4.88%

=== The Best FIFA Women's Coach ===
A panel of experts on women's football representing each of the six confederations selected a shortlist of ten women's football coaches for The Best FIFA Women's Coach. The 10 candidates were announced on 17 August. The three finalists were announced on 22 September 2017.

Sarina Wiegman won the award with over 36% of the vote.

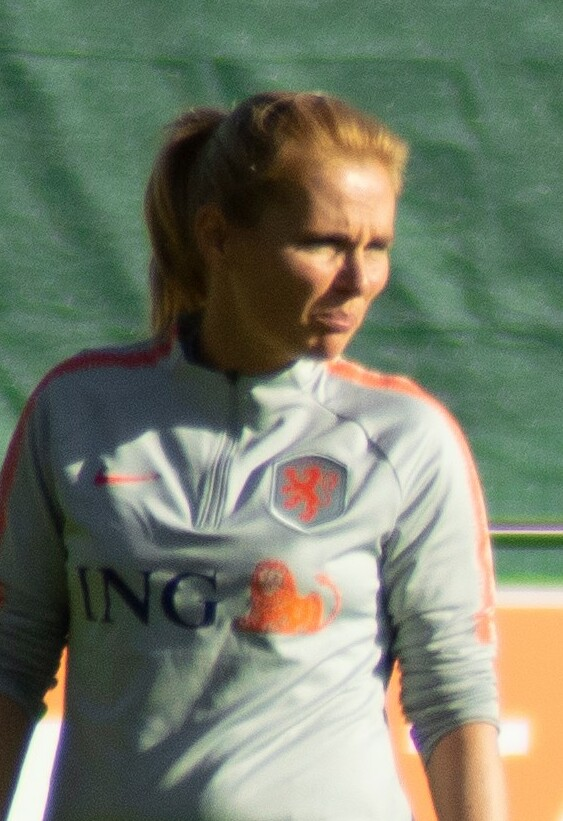
Sarina Wiegman

The selection criteria for the women's football coaches of the year were: performance and general behaviour of their teams on and off the pitch from 20 November 2016 to 6 August 2017.

Rank	Coach	Teams(s) managed	Percent
The finalists
1	(Netherlands) Sarina Wiegman	Netherlands	36.24%
2	(Denmark) Nils Nielsen	Denmark	12.64%
3	(France) Gérard Prêcheur	(France) Lyon	9.37%
Other candidates
4	(England) Emma Hayes	(England) Chelsea	8.63%
5	(Germany) Ralf Kellermann	(Germany) VfL Wolfsburg	6.94%
6	(Nigeria) Florence Omagbemi	Nigeria	6.77%
7	(France) Olivier Echouafni	France	5.21%
8	(Austria) Dominik Thalhammer	Austria	5.20%
9	(Spain) Xavi Llorens	(Spain) Barcelona	4.74%
10	(North Korea) Hwang Yong-Bong	North Korea; North Korea U-20	4.26%

=== FIFA Fair Play Award ===
The award is bestowed on a player, a coach, a team, a match official, an individual fan or a fan group in recognition of exemplary fair play either on the pitch or in relation to an official football match during November 2016 to August 2017. The award was given to the most outstanding ”fair-play” gesture/behaviour of the year (an act of fair play either on the pitch or in relation to an official football match — which could also include any amateur league).

Winner	Reason
(Togo) Francis Koné	Saved the life of an opponent by administering on-pitch first aid after a collision.

=== FIFA Puskás Award ===
The shortlist was announced on 22 September 2017. The three finalists were announced on 9 October 2017.

Olivier Giroud won the award with over 36% of the vote.

Rank	Player	Match	Competition	Date	Percent
The finalists
1	(France) Olivier Giroud	Arsenal – Crystal Palace	2016–17 Premier League	1 January 2017	36.17%
2	(South Africa) Oscarine Masuluke	Baroka – Orlando Pirates	2016–17 South African Premier Division	30 November 2016	27.48%
3	(Venezuela) Deyna Castellanos	Venezuela – Cameroon	2016 FIFA U-17 Women's World Cup	24 October 2016	20.47%
Other candidates
	(Ghana) Kevin-Prince Boateng	Villarreal – Las Palmas	2016–17 La Liga	23 October 2016	15.88%
	(Argentina) Alejandro Camargo	Universidad de Concepción – O'Higgins	2016 Apertura Chilean Primera División	4 December 2016	15.88%
	(France) Moussa Dembélé	St Johnstone – Celtic	2016–17 Scottish Premiership	5 February 2017	15.88%
	(Colombia) Avilés Hurtado	Atlas – Tijuana	2017 Clausura Liga MX	1 March 2017	15.88%
	(Croatia) Mario Mandžukić	Juventus – Real Madrid	2016–17 UEFA Champions League	3 June 2017	15.88%
	(Serbia) Nemanja Matić	Chelsea – Tottenham Hotspur	2016–17 FA Cup	23 April 2017	15.88%
	(Spain) Jordi Mboula	Barcelona – Borussia Dortmund	2016–17 UEFA Youth League	22 February 2017	15.88%

=== FIFA Fan Award ===
The award celebrates the best fan moment of November 2016 to August 2017, regardless of championship, gender or nationality.

The three nominees were announced on 22 September 2017.

Celtic supporters won the award with nearly 56% of the vote.

Rank	Fans	Match	Competition	Date	Percent
1	Celtic supporters	Celtic – Heart of Midlothian	2016–17 Scottish Premiership	21 May 2017	55.92%
2	Borussia Dortmund supporters	Borussia Dortmund – Monaco	2016–17 UEFA Champions League	11–12 April 2017	36.20%
3	Copenhagen supporters	Copenhagen – Brøndby	2016–17 Danish Cup	25 May 2017	7.88%

=== FIFA FIFPRO World11 ===
The 55–player men's shortlist was announced on 20 September 2017.

The players chosen included Gianluigi Buffon as goalkeeper, Dani Alves, Leonardo Bonucci, Sergio Ramos, and Marcelo as defenders, Luka Modrić, Toni Kroos, and Andrés Iniesta as midfielders, and Lionel Messi, Cristiano Ronaldo, and Neymar as forwards.

2017 FIFA FIFPRO World11

Player	Club(s)
Goalkeeper
(Italy) Gianluigi Buffon	(Italy) Juventus
Defenders
(Brazil) Dani Alves	(Italy) Juventus; (France) Paris Saint-Germain
(Italy) Leonardo Bonucci	(Italy) Juventus; (Italy) Milan
(Spain) Sergio Ramos	(Spain) Real Madrid
(Brazil) Marcelo	(Spain) Real Madrid
Midfielders
(Croatia) Luka Modrić	(Spain) Real Madrid
(Germany) Toni Kroos	(Spain) Real Madrid
(Spain) Andrés Iniesta	(Spain) Barcelona
Forwards
(Argentina) Lionel Messi	(Spain) Barcelona
(Portugal) Cristiano Ronaldo	(Spain) Real Madrid
(Brazil) Neymar	(Spain) Barcelona; (France) Paris Saint-Germain

Second Team

Player	Club(s)
Goalkeeper
(Germany) Manuel Neuer	(Germany) Bayern Munich
Defenders
(Spain) Dani Carvajal	(Spain) Real Madrid
(Italy) Giorgio Chiellini	(Italy) Juventus
(Spain) Gerard Piqué	(Spain) Barcelona
(Brazil) Thiago Silva	(France) Paris Saint-Germain
Midfielders
(Spain) Isco	(Spain) Real Madrid
(France) N'Golo Kanté	(England) Chelsea
(France) Paul Pogba	(England) Manchester United
Forwards
(Argentina) Paulo Dybala	(Italy) Juventus
(Poland) Robert Lewandowski	(Germany) Bayern Munich
(Uruguay) Luis Suárez	(Spain) Barcelona

Third Team

Player	Club(s)
Goalkeeper
(Spain) David de Gea	(England) Manchester United
Defenders
(Germany) Jérôme Boateng	(Germany) Bayern Munich
(Germany) Mats Hummels	(Germany) Bayern Munich
(Brazil) David Luiz	(England) Chelsea
(France) Raphaël Varane	(Spain) Real Madrid
Midfielders
(Spain) Sergio Busquets	(Spain) Barcelona
(Brazil) Casemiro	(Spain) Real Madrid
(Italy) Marco Verratti	(France) Paris Saint-Germain
Forwards
(France) Karim Benzema	(Spain) Real Madrid
(Sweden) Zlatan Ibrahimović	(England) Manchester United
(France) Kylian Mbappé	(France) Monaco; (France) Paris Saint-Germain

Fourth Team

Player	Club(s)
Goalkeeper
(Costa Rica) Keylor Navas	(Spain) Real Madrid
Defenders
(Austria) David Alaba	(Germany) Bayern Munich
(Spain) Jordi Alba	(Spain) Barcelona
(Uruguay) Diego Godín	(Spain) Atlético Madrid
(Germany) Philipp Lahm	(Germany) Bayern Munich
Midfielders
(Brazil) Philippe Coutinho	(England) Liverpool
(Belgium) Eden Hazard	(England) Chelsea
(Chile) Arturo Vidal	(Germany) Bayern Munich
Forwards
(France) Antoine Griezmann	(Spain) Atlético Madrid
(Belgium) Romelu Lukaku	(England) Everton; (England) Manchester United
(Chile) Alexis Sánchez	(England) Arsenal

Fifth Team

Player	Club(s)
Goalkeeper
(Slovenia) Jan Oblak	(Spain) Atlético Madrid
Defenders
(Argentina) Javier Mascherano	(Spain) Barcelona
(Portugal) Pepe	(Spain) Real Madrid; (Turkey) Beşiktaş
(France) Samuel Umtiti	(Spain) Barcelona
(Ecuador) Antonio Valencia	(England) Manchester United
Midfielders
(Spain) Thiago Alcântara	(Germany) Bayern Munich
(Serbia) Nemanja Matić	(England) Chelsea; (England) Manchester United
(Germany) Mesut Özil	(England) Arsenal
Forwards
(Wales) Gareth Bale	(Spain) Real Madrid
(Uruguay) Edinson Cavani	(France) Paris Saint-Germain
(England) Harry Kane	(England) Tottenham Hotspur
