= The Best FIFA Football Awards 2016 =

International football award

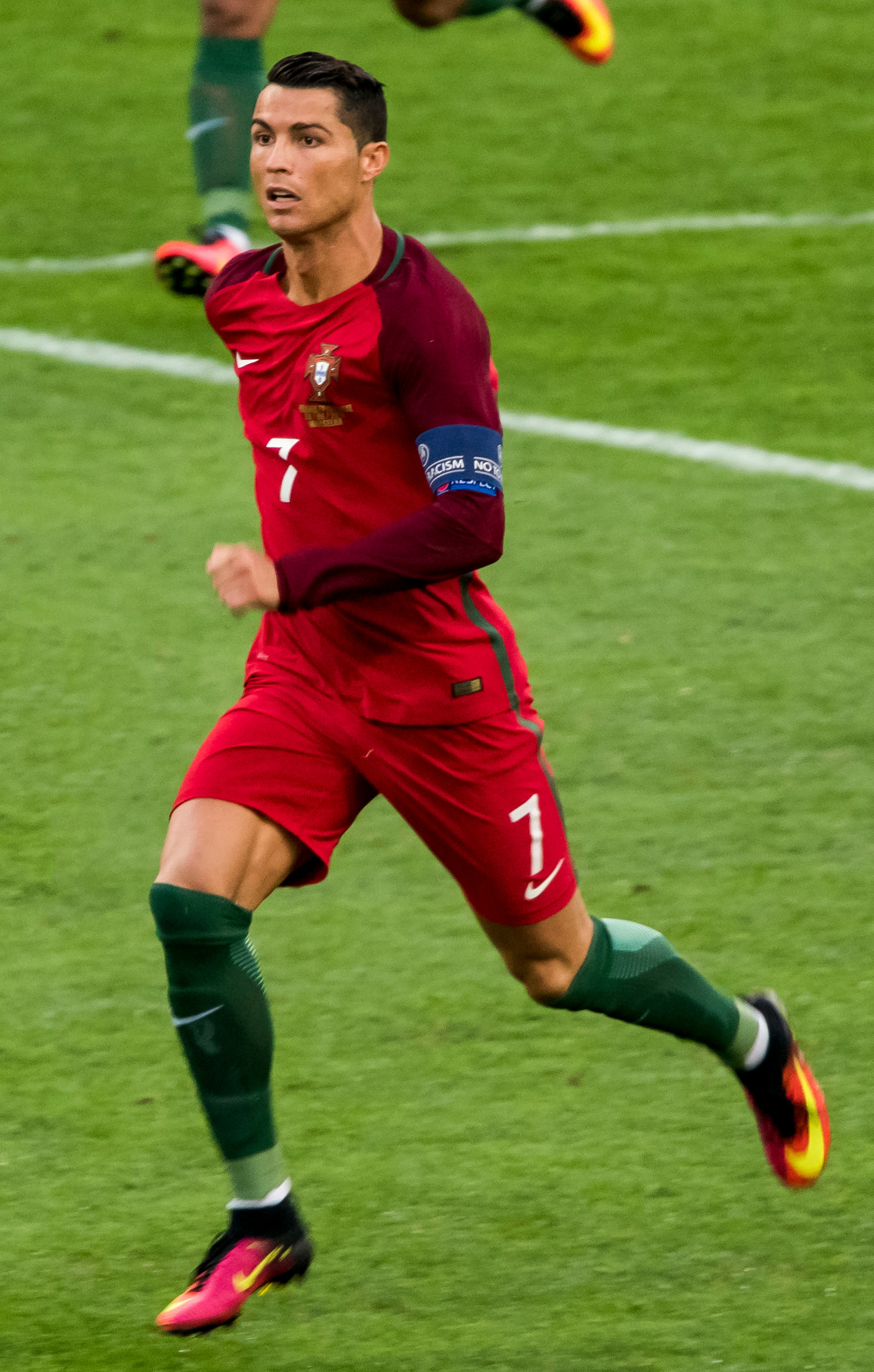
- Cristiano Ronaldo, The Best FIFA Men's Player 2016
- Date: 9 January 2017
- Location: Zürich, Switzerland
- Presented by: FIFA
- Hosted by: Eva Longoria and Marco Schreyl

Highlights
- The Best FIFA Player: Men's: (Portugal) Cristiano Ronaldo; Women's: (United States) Carli Lloyd
- The Best FIFA Coach: Men's: (Italy) Claudio Ranieri; Women's: (Germany) Silvia Neid
- FIFA Puskás Award: (Malaysia) Mohd Faiz Subri
- Website: fifa.com

The Best FIFA Football Awards 2016 were held on 9 January 2017 in Zürich, Switzerland. The Best FIFA Football Awards are the annual recognitions awarded by FIFA to several individuals across different categories, including: best eleven players of the year, known as FIFA FIFPro World XI (awards goalkeeper, best defenders l, midfielders, attackers), FIFA World Coach of the Year for men's and for women's football, best female player of the year, 2nd best male player of the year, and best goal of the year (known as FIFA Puskás Award). The FIFA Fair Play Award is the only award that usually goes to groups or entities instead of individuals.

The selection criteria for the (men's and women's) players of the year were: sporting performance, as well as general conduct on and off the pitch from 20 November 2015 to 22 November 2016. The selection criteria for the coaches of the year were: performance and general behaviour of their teams on and off the pitch from 20 November 2015 to 22 November 2016.

The votes were decided by media representatives, national team coaches, and national team captains. In October 2016, it was announced that the general public would also be allowed to vote. Each group contributed 25% of the overall vote.

The ceremony was hosted by Eva Longoria and Marco Schreyl.

== Winners and nominees ==
=== The Best FIFA Men's Player ===
The Football Committee compiled a shortlist of 23 male players for The Best FIFA Men's Player.

The 23 candidates were announced on 4 November. The three finalists were announced on 1 December 2016.

Cristiano Ronaldo won the award with nearly 35% of the vote.

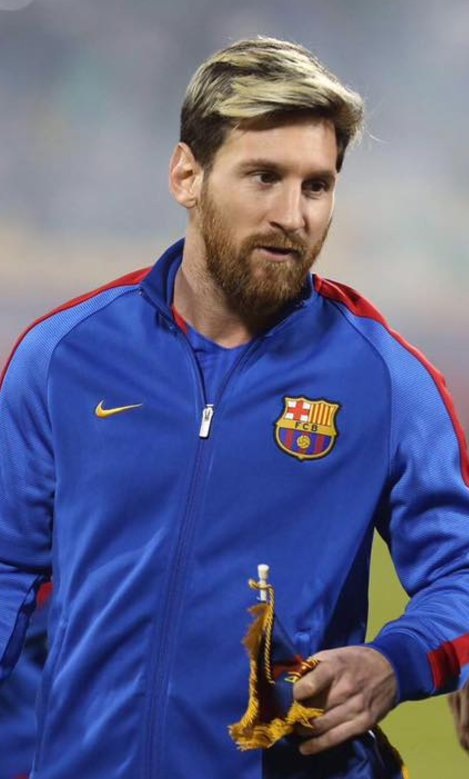
Lionel Messi

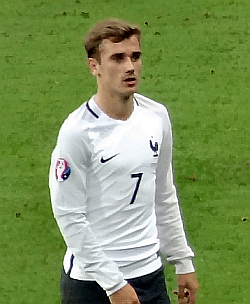
Antoine Griezmann

Rank	Player	Club(s) played for	National team	Percent
The finalists
1	Cristiano Ronaldo	(Spain) Real Madrid	Portugal	34.54%
2	Lionel Messi	(Spain) Barcelona	Argentina	26.42%
3	Antoine Griezmann	(Spain) Atlético Madrid	France	7.53%
Other candidates
4	Neymar	(Spain) Barcelona	Brazil	6.23%
5	Luis Suárez	(Spain) Barcelona	Uruguay	5.11%
6	Gareth Bale	(Spain) Real Madrid	Wales	4.62%
7	Riyad Mahrez	(England) Leicester City	Algeria	2.20%
8	Gianluigi Buffon	(Italy) Juventus	Italy	1.85%
9	Andrés Iniesta	(Spain) Barcelona	Spain	1.69%
10	Toni Kroos	(Spain) Real Madrid	Germany	1.25%
11	Alexis Sánchez	(England) Arsenal	Chile	1.19%
12	Robert Lewandowski	(Germany) Bayern Munich	Poland	0.93%
13	Luka Modrić	(Spain) Real Madrid	Croatia	0.89%
14	Mesut Özil	(England) Arsenal	Germany	0.86%
15	Jamie Vardy	(England) Leicester City	England	0.81%
16	Manuel Neuer	(Germany) Bayern Munich	Germany	0.80%
17	Sergio Ramos	(Spain) Real Madrid	Spain	0.70%
18	Zlatan Ibrahimović	(France) Paris Saint-Germain; (England) Manchester United	Sweden	0.50%
19	Paul Pogba	(Italy) Juventus; (England) Manchester United	France	0.47%
20	Kevin De Bruyne	(England) Manchester City	Belgium	0.46%
21	N'Golo Kanté	(England) Leicester City; (England) Chelsea	France	0.40%
22	Sergio Agüero	(England) Manchester City	Argentina	0.38%
23	Dimitri Payet	(England) West Ham United	France	0.17%

=== The Best FIFA Women's Player ===
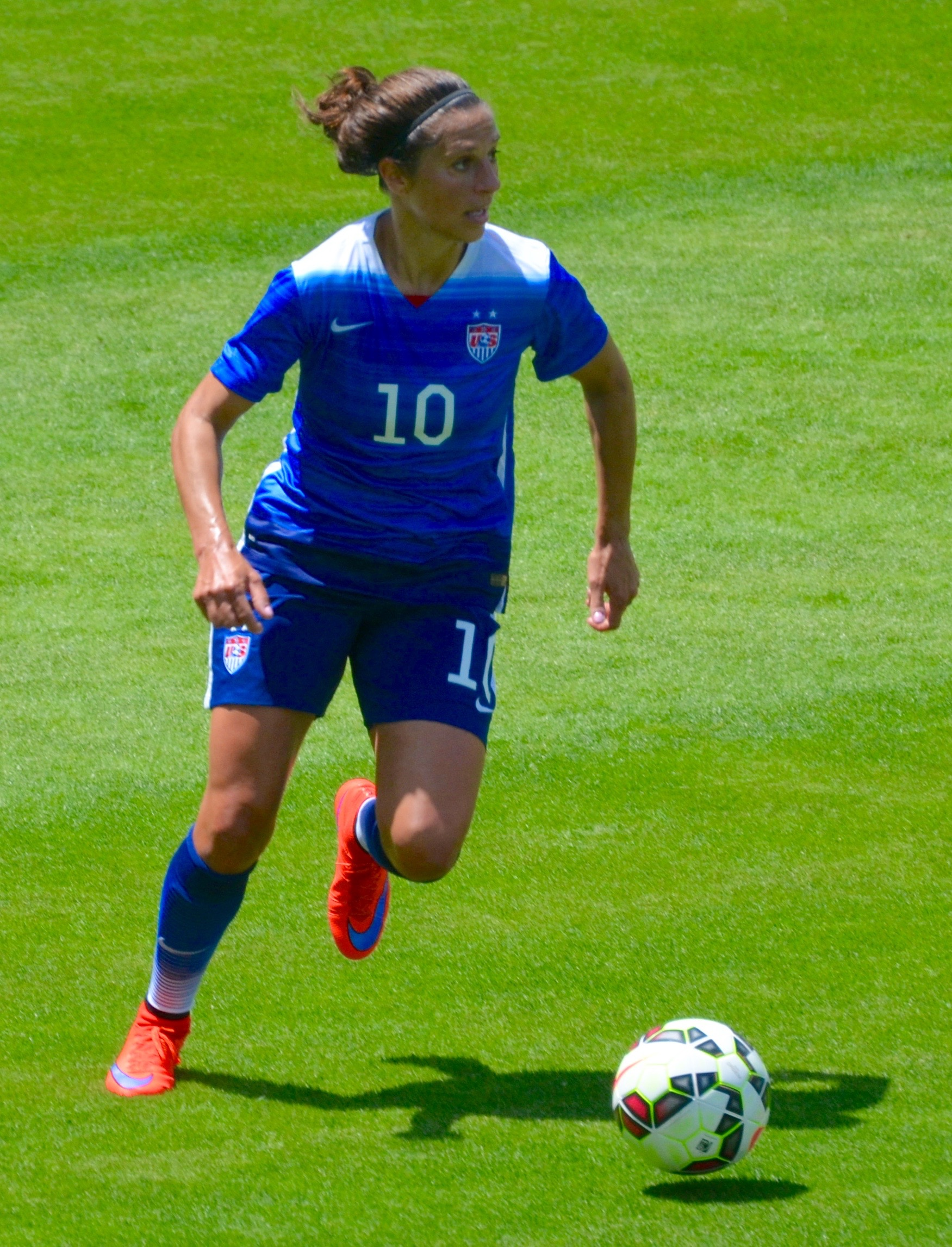
Carli Lloyd

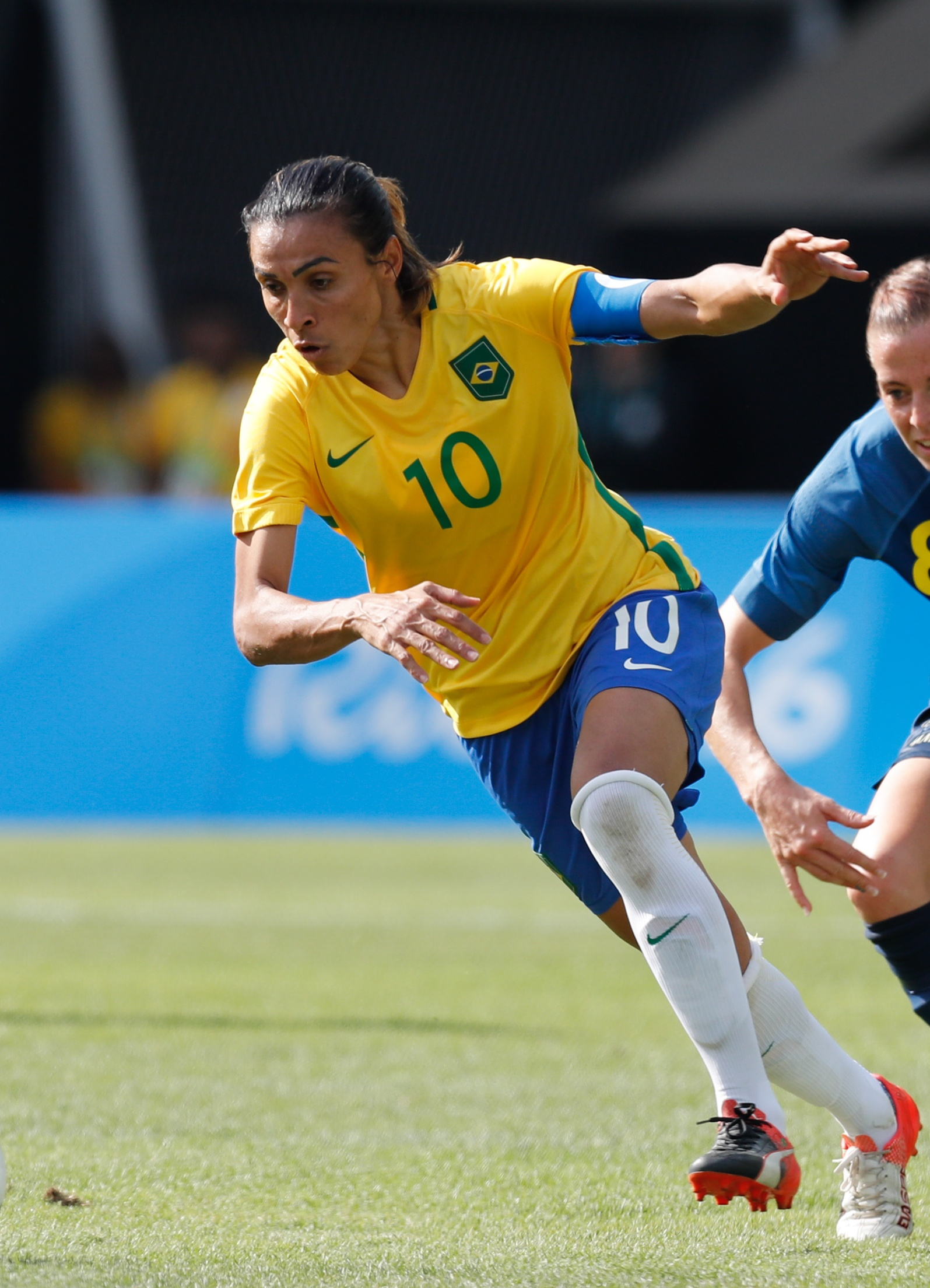
Marta

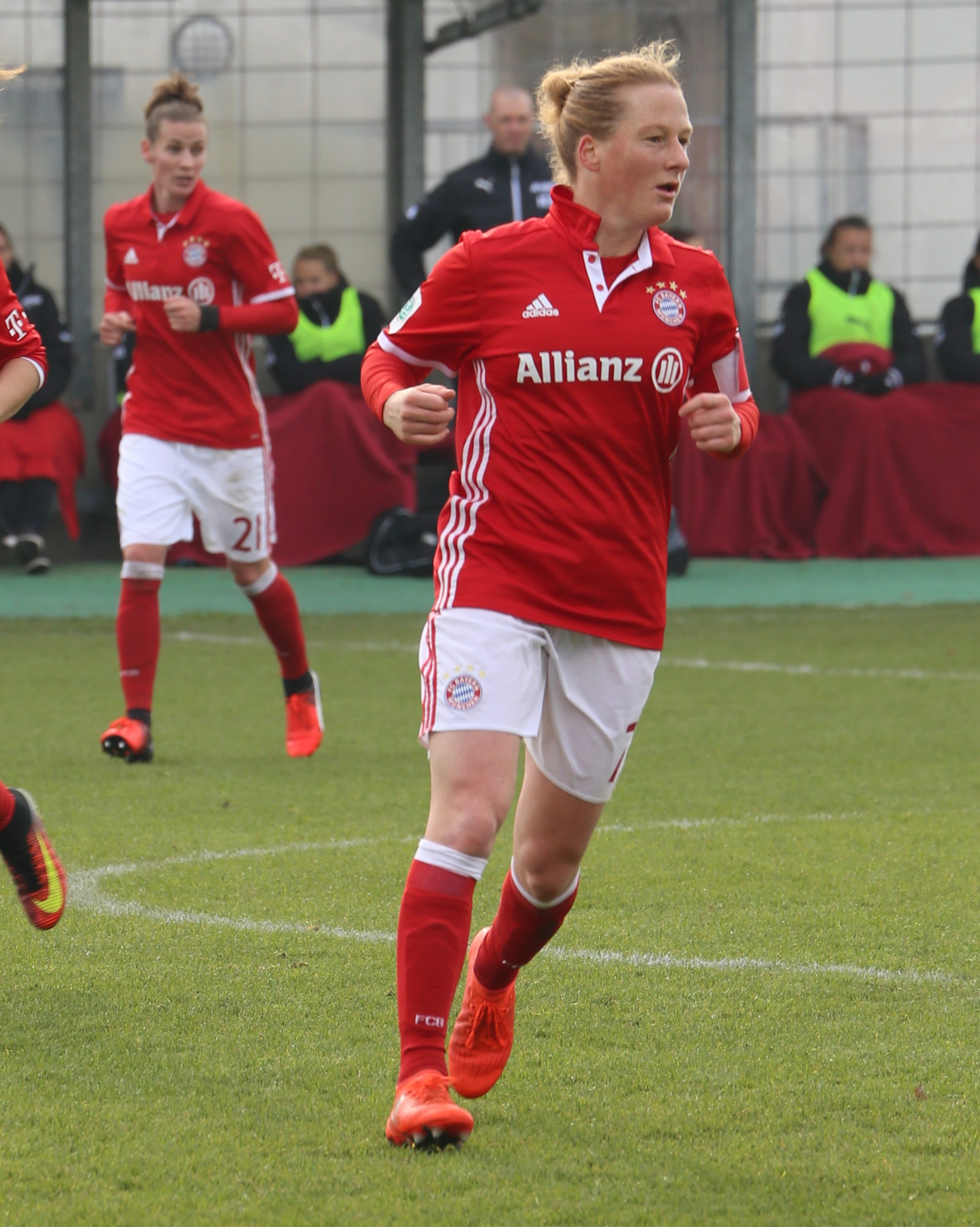
Melanie Behringer

The Committee for Women's Football and the FIFA Women's World Cup compiled a shortlist of 10 female players for The Best FIFA Women's Player.

The 10 candidates were announced on 3 November. The three finalists were announced on 2 December.

Carli Lloyd won the award with nearly 21% of the vote.

Rank	Player	Club(s) played for	National team	Percent
The finalists
1	Carli Lloyd	(United States) Houston Dash	United States	20.68%
2	Marta	(Sweden) FC Rosengård	Brazil	16.60%
3	Melanie Behringer	(Germany) Bayern Munich	Germany	12.34%
Other candidates
4	Dzsenifer Marozsán	(Germany) 1. FFC Frankfurt; (France) Lyon	Germany	11.68%
5	Sara Däbritz	(Germany) Bayern Munich	Germany	8.19%
6	Saki Kumagai	(France) Lyon	Japan	6.94%
7	Lotta Schelin	(France) Lyon	Sweden	6.58%
8	Christine Sinclair	(United States) Portland Thorns	Canada	5.99%
9	Amandine Henry	(United States) Portland Thorns	France	5.96%
10	Camille Abily	(France) Lyon	France	5.04%

=== The Best FIFA Men's Coach ===
The Football Committee compiled a shortlist of 10 men's football coaches for The Best FIFA Men's Coach.

The 10 candidates were announced on 2 November. The three finalists were announced in December 2016.

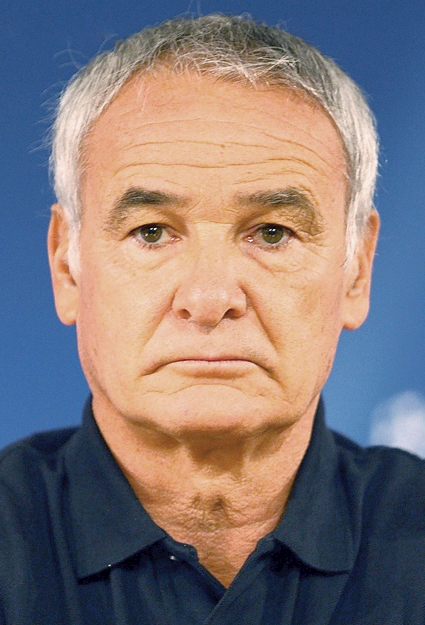
Claudio Ranieri

Claudio Ranieri won the award with over 22% of the vote.

Rank	Coach	Team(s) managed	Percent
The finalists
1	(Italy) Claudio Ranieri	(England) Leicester City	22.06%
2	(France) Zinedine Zidane	(Spain) Real Madrid	16.56%
3	(Portugal) Fernando Santos	Portugal	16.24%
Other candidates
4	(Argentina) Diego Simeone	(Spain) Atlético Madrid	12.98%
5	(Spain) Pep Guardiola	(Germany) Bayern Munich; (England) Manchester City	11.13%
6	(Spain) Luis Enrique	(Spain) Barcelona	8.32%
7	(Germany) Jürgen Klopp	(England) Liverpool	7.71%
8	(France) Didier Deschamps	France	1.97%
9	(Wales) Chris Coleman	Wales	1.82%
10	(Argentina) Mauricio Pochettino	(England) Tottenham Hotspur	1.21%

=== The Best FIFA Women's Coach ===
The Committee for Women's Football and the FIFA Women's World Cup compiled a shortlist of 10 women's football coaches for The Best FIFA Women's Coach.

The 10 candidates were announced on 1 November. The three finalists were announced on 2 December 2016.

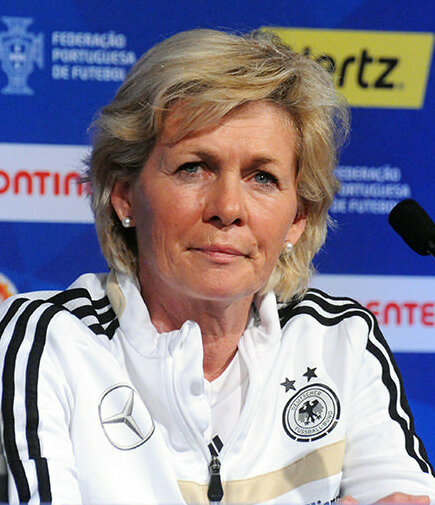
Silvia Neid

Silvia Neid won the award with nearly 30% of the vote.

Rank	Coach	Team(s) managed	Percent
The finalists
1	(Germany) Silvia Neid	Germany	29.99%
2	(England) Jill Ellis	United States	16.68%
3	(Sweden) Pia Sundhage	Sweden	16.47%
Other candidates
4	(England) John Herdman	Canada	7.85%
5	(France) Gérard Prêcheur	(France) Lyon	7.26%
6	(Brazil) Vadão	Brazil	6.00%
7	(Germany) Martina Voss-Tecklenburg	Switzerland	4.07%
8	(Netherlands) Vera Pauw	South Africa	3.99%
9	(Germany) Thomas Wörle	(Germany) Bayern Munich	3.96%
10	(France) Philippe Bergeroo	France	3.73%

=== FIFA Fair Play Award ===
Colombian club Atlético Nacional won the award due to their gesture of asking CONMEBOL to award the 2016 Copa Sudamericana title to Brazilian club Chapecoense following the LaMia Flight 2933 disaster, which resulted in the deaths of 19 players and 23 staff members of the Brazilian club.

Winner	Reason
(Colombia) Atlético Nacional	Requested CONMEBOL to award Chapecoense with the 2016 Copa Sudamericana title following LaMia Flight 2933 crash

=== FIFA Award for an Outstanding Career ===
Brazilian futsal player Falcão won the award for his 27 years of contribution to the sport.

Player	Reason
(Brazil) Falcão	As a result of his remarkable contribution to the sport

=== FIFA Puskás Award ===
External videos
- Mohd Faiz Subri (MAS) - FIFA PUSKAS AWARD 2016 WINNER! on YouTube
- THE FIFA PUSKAS AWARD 2016 - Mohd Faiz Subri WINNER on YouTube

The shortlist was announced on 21 November 2016. The three finalists were announced on 2 December 2016.

Mohd Faiz Subri won the award with over 59% of the vote.

Rank	Player	Match	Competition	Date	Percent
The finalists
1	(Malaysia) Mohd Faiz Subri	Penang – Pahang	2016 Malaysia Super League	16 February 2016	59.46%
2	(Brazil) Marlone	Corinthians – Cobresal	2016 Copa Libertadores	21 April 2016	22.86%
3	(Venezuela) Daniuska Rodríguez	Venezuela – Colombia	2016 South American U-17 Women's Championship	14 March 2016	10.01%
Other candidates
	(Spain) Mario Gaspar	Spain – England	International friendly	13 November 2015	7.68%
	(South Africa) Hlompho Kekana	Cameroon – South Africa	2017 Africa Cup of Nations qualification	26 March 2016	7.68%
	(Argentina) Lionel Messi	United States – Argentina	Copa América Centenario	21 June 2016	7.68%
	(Brazil) Neymar	Barcelona – Villarreal	2015–16 La Liga	8 November 2015	7.68%
	(Wales) Hal Robson-Kanu	Wales – Belgium	UEFA Euro 2016	1 July 2016	7.68%
	(Spain) Saúl	Atlético Madrid – Bayern Munich	2015–16 UEFA Champions League	27 April 2016	7.68%
	(Finland) Simon Skrabb	Gefle IF – Åtvidabergs FF	2015 Allsvenskan	31 October 2015	7.68%

=== FIFA Fan Award ===
The three nominees were announced on 9 December 2016. It was the first time that this award was given.

Borussia Dortmund and Liverpool supporters won the award with nearly 46% of the vote.

Rank	Fans	Reason	Match	Competition	Date	Percent
1	Borussia Dortmund and Liverpool supporters	Before their match, which occurred one day before the anniversary of the Hillsborough disaster, fans of both teams united to sing in harmony "You'll Never Walk Alone", an anthem used by both teams.	Liverpool – Borussia Dortmund	2015–16 UEFA Europa League	14 April 2016	45.92%
2	Iceland supporters	After getting eliminated in the quarter-final of Euro 2016 against hosts France, almost 30,000 Iceland fans, almost 8% of the total population of Iceland, echoed the players in performing the Viking Thunder Clap, in a show of pride for the Iceland team.	France – Iceland	UEFA Euro 2016	3 July 2016	31.37%
3	ADO Den Haag supporters	In the Eredivisie match against Feyenoord, ADO Den Haag fans sitting in the upper seating tier of De Kuip threw teddy bears and other stuffed animals down into the lower tier, in which ill children from the Sophia Childrens' Hospital were seated,	Feyenoord – ADO Den Haag	2016–17 Eredivisie	11 September 2016	22.71%

=== FIFA FIFPRO World11 ===
The 55–player men's shortlist was announced on 1 December 2016.

The players chosen included Manuel Neuer as goalkeeper, Dani Alves, Gerard Piqué, Sergio Ramos, and Marcelo as defenders, Luka Modrić, Toni Kroos, and Andrés Iniesta as midfielders, and Lionel Messi, Luis Suárez, and Cristiano Ronaldo as forwards.

9 out of the 11 players played in La Liga.

FIFA FIFPRO World11 2016

Player	Club(s)
Goalkeeper
(Germany) Manuel Neuer	(Germany) Bayern Munich
Defenders
(Brazil) Dani Alves	(Spain) Barcelona; (Italy) Juventus
(Spain) Gerard Piqué	(Spain) Barcelona
(Spain) Sergio Ramos	(Spain) Real Madrid
(Brazil) Marcelo	(Spain) Real Madrid
Midfielders
(Croatia) Luka Modrić	(Spain) Real Madrid
(Germany) Toni Kroos	(Spain) Real Madrid
(Spain) Andrés Iniesta	(Spain) Barcelona
Forwards
(Argentina) Lionel Messi	(Spain) Barcelona
(Uruguay) Luis Suárez	(Spain) Barcelona
(Portugal) Cristiano Ronaldo	(Spain) Real Madrid

Second Team

Player	Club(s)
Goalkeeper
(Italy) Gianluigi Buffon	(Italy) Juventus
Defenders
(Austria) David Alaba	(Germany) Bayern Munich
(Portugal) Pepe	(Spain) Real Madrid
(Brazil) Thiago Silva	(France) Paris Saint-Germain
(Germany) Jérôme Boateng	(Germany) Bayern Munich
Midfielders
(Germany) Mesut Özil	(England) Arsenal
(Spain) Sergio Busquets	(Spain) Barcelona
(France) Paul Pogba	(Italy) Juventus; (England) Manchester United
Forwards
(Brazil) Neymar	(Spain) Barcelona
(Sweden) Zlatan Ibrahimović	(France) Paris Saint-Germain; (England) Manchester United
(France) Antoine Griezmann	(Spain) Atlético Madrid

Third Team

Player	Club(s)
Goalkeeper
(Spain) David de Gea	(England) Manchester United
Defenders
(Spain) Jordi Alba	(Spain) Barcelona
(Spain) Dani Carvajal	(Spain) Real Madrid
(Uruguay) Diego Godín	(Spain) Atlético Madrid
(Germany) Philipp Lahm	(Germany) Bayern Munich
Midfielders
(Belgium) Kevin De Bruyne	(England) Manchester City
(France) N'Golo Kanté	(England) Leicester City; (England) Chelsea
(Chile) Arturo Vidal	(Germany) Bayern Munich
Forwards
(Argentina) Sergio Agüero	(England) Manchester City
(Wales) Gareth Bale	(Spain) Real Madrid
(Poland) Robert Lewandowski	(Germany) Bayern Munich

Fourth Team

Player	Club(s)
Goalkeeper
(Costa Rica) Keylor Navas	(Spain) Real Madrid
Defenders
(France) Raphaël Varane	(Spain) Real Madrid
(Germany) Mats Hummels	(Germany) Borussia Dortmund; (Germany) Bayern Munich
(Italy) Leonardo Bonucci	(Italy) Juventus
(Brazil) David Luiz	(France) Paris Saint-Germain; (England) Chelsea
Midfielders
(Belgium) Eden Hazard	(England) Chelsea
(Italy) Marco Verratti	(France) Paris Saint-Germain
(Croatia) Ivan Rakitić	(Spain) Barcelona
Forwards
(France) Karim Benzema	(Spain) Real Madrid
(Argentina) Gonzalo Higuaín	(Italy) Napoli; (Italy) Juventus
(Chile) Alexis Sánchez	(England) Arsenal

Fifth Team

Player	Club(s)
Goalkeeper
(Chile) Claudio Bravo	(Spain) Barcelona; (England) Manchester City
Defenders
(Ivory Coast) Serge Aurier	(France) Paris Saint-Germain
(Argentina) Javier Mascherano	(Spain) Barcelona
(Italy) Giorgio Chiellini	(Italy) Juventus
(Spain) Héctor Bellerín	(England) Arsenal
Midfielders
(France) Dimitri Payet	(England) West Ham United
(Spain) Xabi Alonso	(Germany) Bayern Munich
(Spain) David Silva	(England) Manchester City
Forwards
(Argentina) Paulo Dybala	(Italy) Juventus
(England) Jamie Vardy	(England) Leicester City
(Germany) Thomas Müller	(Germany) Bayern Munich

== See also ==
- Ballon d'Or
- FIFA Ballon d'Or
- FIFA World Player of the Year
- FIFPro World XI
