= The Munch Box =

British children's cooking game show

- Genre: Children's cooking game show
- Presented by: Layla Anna-Lee; Ben Ebbrell (2013); Joe Hurd (2014)
- Country of origin: United Kingdom
- Original language: English
- No. of series: 2
- No. of episodes: 24

Production
- Running time: 55 minutes (inc. adverts)
- Production company: Cactus TV

Original release
- Network: CITV
- Release: 5 October 2013 – 13 December 2014

The Munch Box is a children's cooking game show that aired on CITV from 5 October 2013 to 13 December 2014, hosted by Layla Anna-Lee with Ben Ebbrell for Series 1, and by Joe Hurd for Series 2.

== Transmissions ==
Series	Start date	End date	Episodes
1	5 October 2013	21 December 2013	12
2	20 September 2014	13 December 2014	12
