= Layla Anna-Lee =

English television presenter (born 1983)

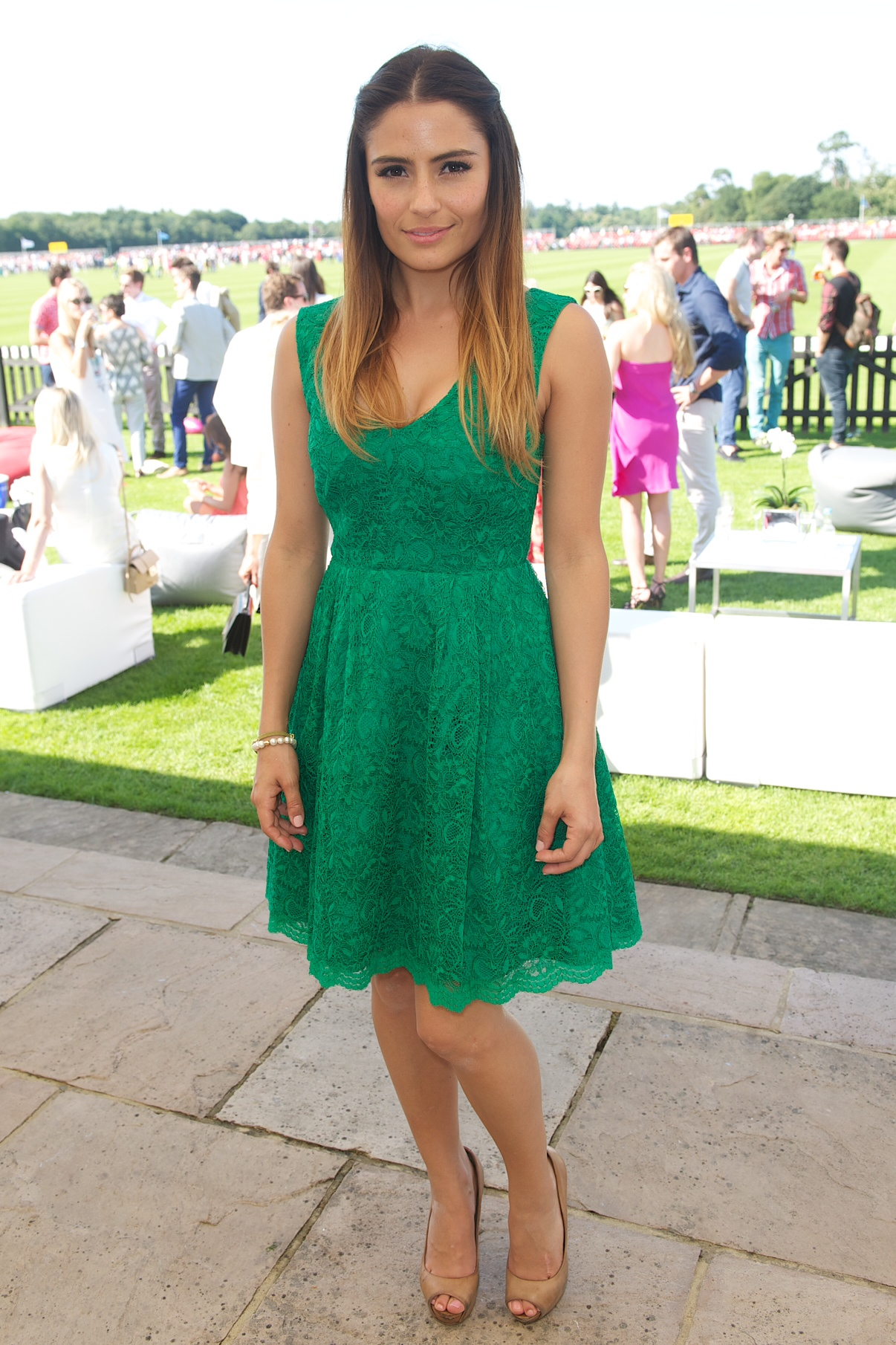
- Anna-Lee in 2012
- Born: Layla Machado; 22 March 1983 (age 43); London, England
- Education: Sylvia Young Theatre School
- Occupation: Television presenter
- Spouses: Richard Cullen (m. 2014, divorced) Ian Machado Garry (m. 2022)
- Children: 2
- Website: laylaannalee.com

Layla Machado Garry (née Machado; born 22 March 1983), better known as Layla Anna-Lee, is an English television presenter, specialising in sports.

== Early life ==
Anna-Lee was born Layla Machado, in London, the daughter of a Brazilian mother and an English father of Irish and Scottish ancestry. She appeared in a commercial for Fairy Liquid when she was six, and attended the Sylvia Young Theatre School in London.

== Career ==
Anna-Lee has co-presented the Saturday morning children's cooking-based game show The Munch Box for CITV, has presented Nick Kicks on Nickelodeon, and can also be seen on BBC Bitesize helping children learn French. She has hosted OK! Insider since its launch in 2008, presenting red carpet events and interviewing celebrities for the magazine's website. In 2010, she blogged for OK! Magazine Online, covering Big Brother 11, which led to her appearing on Big Brother's Little Brother. She also hosted the Queen's Diamond Jubilee party in front of 20,000 people in Trafalgar Square.

In sports, Anna-Lee was chosen in 2008 to present the BMX European Championships for Eurosport. In 2010, she presented Sky Sports' major road cycling events and National Championships. Her voice was heard by millions around the world announcing the opening ceremony and beach volleyball tournaments at the Summer Olympics in 2012. Having presented the Goal Line show on Goal.com, she was headhunted by MLS's KickTV and hosted their weekly show The Rumour Mill before hosting KickTV’s coverage of the Confederations Cup in 2013. She hosted the live F2 Show during summer 2016. In 2014 she was in Brazil for the World Cup to host Layla’s World Cup for KickTv, and during the World Cup also hosted adidas' live World Cup show, The Dugout. She hosted O2 Inside Line, following the England rugby union team in an official RFU programme throughout the QBE internationals and 6 Nations. On 23 October 2017, she co-hosted The Best Fifa Football Awards, alongside Idris Elba.

Anna-Lee frequently works with Red Bull TV, hosting live coverage around the world, including Airpower live from Austria, Rio Carnival from Rio de Janeiro and the Wings for Life World Run in Brasília. She has hosted regular features on ESPN UK and its successor BT Sport ESPN, including the UFC show UFC Connected and Cage Warriors. She co-presents the Champions League show adidas Gameday Plus with Roman Kemp, and recently worked with Star Sports Network anchoring their prime-time football show, Let's Football Live, for the Hero Indian Super League. At the 2018 World Cup, she presented an online video series for NBC Sports, Layla's Occasionally Unbiased Football Show.

Anna-Lee was named in Time Out Magazine's 2012 Hot 100 list of the most influential creatives in Britain, and in 2013 was named to the FHM 100 Sexiest Women in the World.

=== Presenting ===
- Presenter of Cage Warriors on BT Sport
- ITV and CITV cooking show The Munch Box
- Female voice of the London 2012 Olympic Opening Ceremony (with Marc Edwards, the male voice)
- The Best FIFA Football Awards 2017 - co-host, alongside Idris Elba
- Presenter of UFC Connected
- Host of Neymar Jr's Fives World Finals on Red Bull TV
- Presenter of adidas World Cup show in Brazil, The Dugout
- Presenter Extreme E

== Personal life ==
Machado's first marriage was to Richard Cullen in early 2014, with whom she has a son.

Machado married Irish mixed martial artist Ian Garry in Las Vegas on 26 February 2022.

In April 2022, it was announced that Machado was pregnant with her second, and the couple's first child. Garry announced they had a son in October 2022.

== Bibliography ==
- Anne-Lee, Layla (March 2012). How to be a WAG. Create Digital Publishing. ISBN 978-1-909139-17-6.
