= Sarah Günther-Werlein =

German footballer (born 1983)

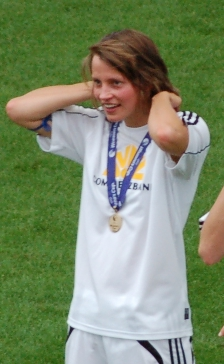
- Günther-Werlein in 2008

Personal information
- Full name: Sarah Günther-Werlein
- Birth name: Sarah Günther
- Date of birth: 25 January 1983 (age 43)
- Place of birth: Bremen, West Germany
- Height: 1.67 m (5 ft 6 in)
- Position: Midfielder

Youth career
- ATS Buntentor

Senior career*
Years	Team	Apps	(Gls)
–2003	ATS Buntentor		
2003–2005	Hamburger SV	40	(4)
2005–2010	1. FFC Frankfurt	44	(4)
2010–2011	Germania Wiesbaden		

International career
2002	Germany U-19		
2001–2005	Germany	27	(0)
Medal record
Women's Football
Bronze medal – third place	2004 Athens	Team competition
- * Club domestic league appearances and goals

Sarah Günther-Werlein (née Günther; born 25 January 1983) is a German former footballer who played as a midfielder. She was capped for the Germany national team.

== Honours ==
Germany

- UEFA Women's Championship: 2005
