= Gérard Prêcheur =

French football manager (born 1959)

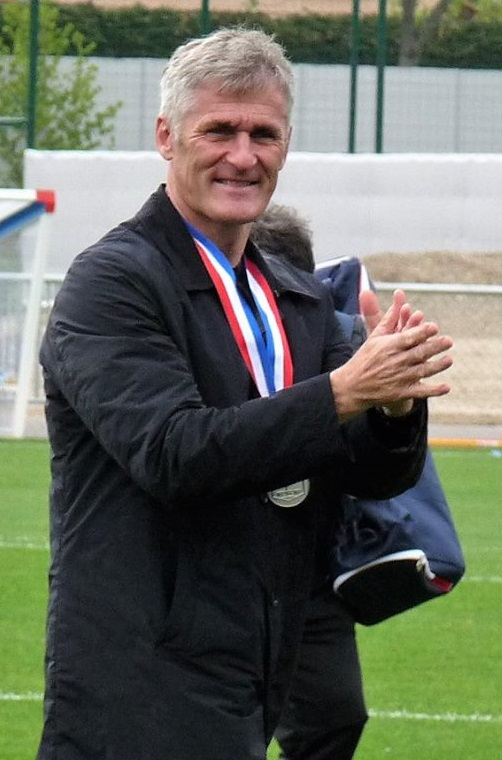
- Prêcheur in 2017

Personal information
- Date of birth: 23 October 1959 (age 67)
- Place of birth: Nancy, France
- Height: 1.82 m (6 ft 0 in)
- Position: Midfielder

Senior career*
Years	Team	Apps	(Gls)
1977–1980	SR Saint-Dié		
1980–1982	AS Montferrand		
1982–1985	USF Le Puy-en-Velay		
1985–1988	Olympique de Valence		

Managerial career
- 1988–1992: Olympique de Valence
- 2000–2004: France U20 (women)
- 2014–2017: Lyon (women)
- 2018–2019: Jiangsu Suning (women)
- 2022–2023: Paris Saint-Germain (women)
- * Club domestic league appearances and goals

Gérard Prêcheur (born 23 October 1959) is a French professional football manager and former player who played as a midfielder. He most recently coached Division 1 Féminine club Paris Saint-Germain.

Prêcheur was previously in charge of Lyon and Jiangsu Suning. He was nominated for The Best FIFA Women's Coach in 2016 and 2017.

== Managerial career ==
Prêcheur started his managerial career with Olympique de Valence in 1988. From 2000 to 2014, he worked with French Football Federation for 14 years in different roles including head of women's football section, head coach of under-20 women's team and INF Clairefontaine manager.

In June 2014, Prêcheur was appointed as the head coach of Division 1 Féminine club Lyon. On 1 August 2022, he was announced as the manager of Paris Saint-Germain, replacing Didier Ollé-Nicolle. He signed a contract until June 2023 with an option to extend for one more year.

== Personal life ==
Prêcheur's son Jocelyn Prêcheur is also a football manager.

== Honours ==
Lyon

- Division 1 Féminine: 2014–15, 2015–16, 2016–17
- Coupe de France féminine: 2014–15, 2015–16, 2016–17
- UEFA Women's Champions League: 2015–16, 2016–17

Jiangsu Suning

- Chinese Women's Super League: 2019
