= Carolin Schiewe =

German footballer (born 1988)

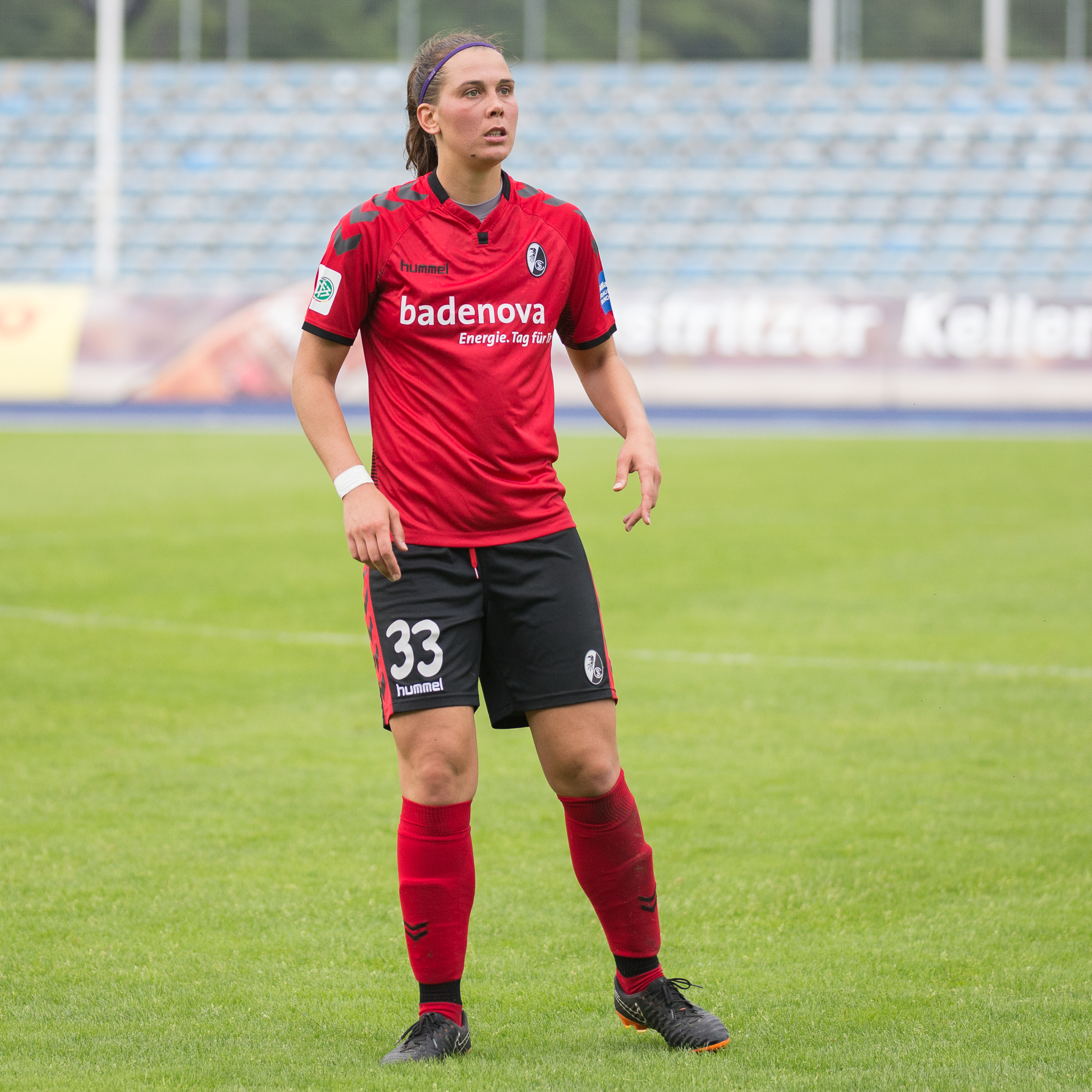
- Schiewe in 2018

Personal information
- Full name: Carolin Schiewe
- Date of birth: October 23, 1988 (age 38)
- Place of birth: Berlin, Germany
- Height: 1.82 m (6 ft 0 in)
- Position: Midfielder

Youth career
- –2001: Rot-Weiß Groß Glienecke
- 2001–2005: 1. FFC Turbine Potsdam

Senior career*
Years	Team	Apps	(Gls)
2005–2010	1.FFC Turbine Potsdam	61	(9)
2010–2015	FF USV Jena	109	(17)
2015–2020	SC Freiburg	64	(7)
- * Club domestic league appearances and goals ‡ National team caps and goals as of 14 November 2007

Carolin Schiewe (born 23 October 1988) is a German football midfielder. She played for SC Freiburg.

== Career ==
Norn in Berlin, Schiewe began her career at Rot-Weiß Groß Glienecke. She joined the academy of 1. FFC Turbine Potsdam in 2001. Her first titles were the German girls championship in 2003, 2004 and 2005. In 2004, she won the World under 19 championship before winning the European under 19 championship in 2006 and 2007.

She became a member of Turbines first team in 2005 and won both the championship and the cup in 2006. She also captained Potsdam to UEFA Cup and UEFA Champions League titles.

After five seasons with FF USV Jena, Schiewe joined rivals SC Freiburg.
