= Josephine Schlanke =

German footballer

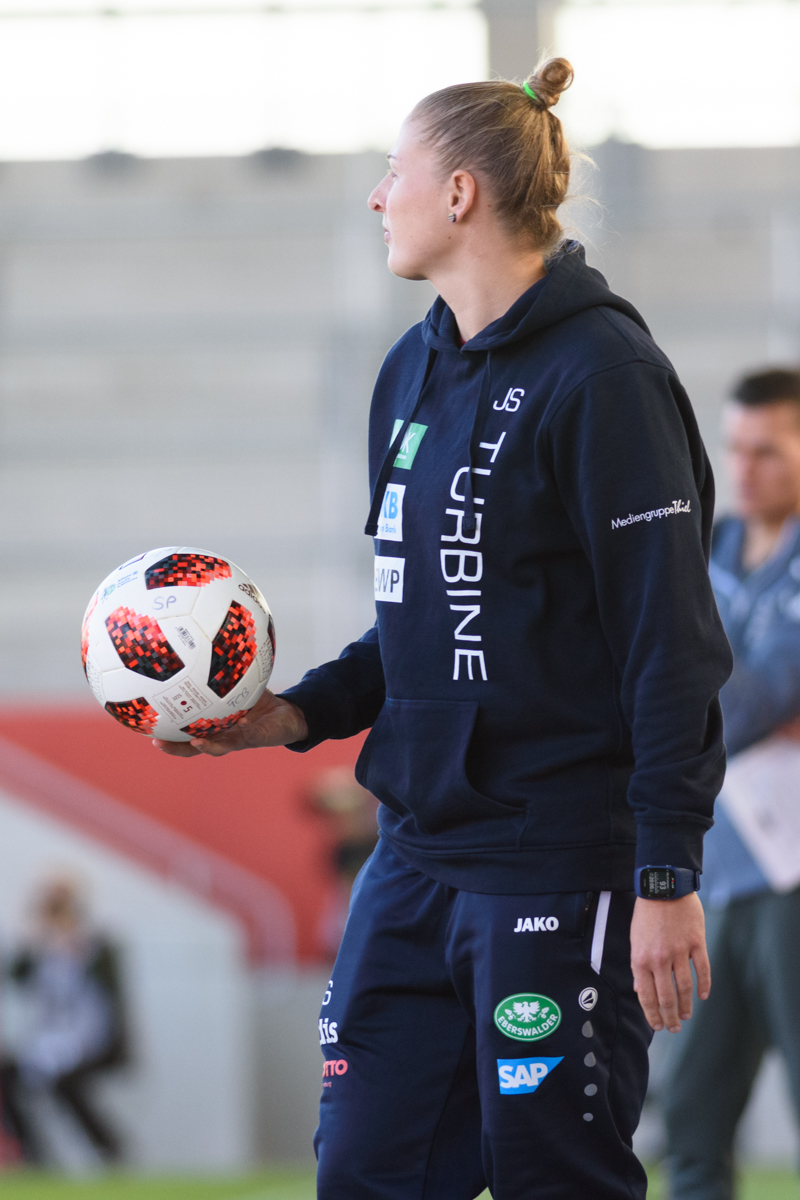
- Schlanke in 2019

Personal information
- Full name: Josephine Schlanke
- Date of birth: 19 March 1988 (age 38)
- Place of birth: Luckenwalde, East Germany
- Position: Defender

Team information
- Current team: 1. FFC Turbine Potsdam
- Number: 23

Youth career
- –2002: SV 1813 Dennewitz
- 2002–2005: 1. FFC Turbine Potsdam

Senior career*
Years	Team	Apps	(Gls)
2005–	1.FFC Turbine Potsdam	17	(0)
- * Club domestic league appearances and goals ‡ National team caps and goals as of 14 November 2007

Josephine Schlanke (born 19 March 1988) is a German football defender. She currently plays for 1. FFC Turbine Potsdam II.

== Career ==
Schlanke began her career at SV 1813 Dennewitz. She joined the academy of 1. FFC Turbine Potsdam in 2002. She won the German girls championship in 2003, 2004 and 2005. Schlanke won the European under 19 championship in 2006.

Schlanke became assistant manager for Turbine Potsdam on 21 July 2017, replacing Jennifer Zietz. In September 2020, she transferred to Hamburger SV to become assistant manager to Manuel Alpers. Her departure was announced on 18 May 2021.
