= Peggy Nietgen =

German footballer (born 1986)

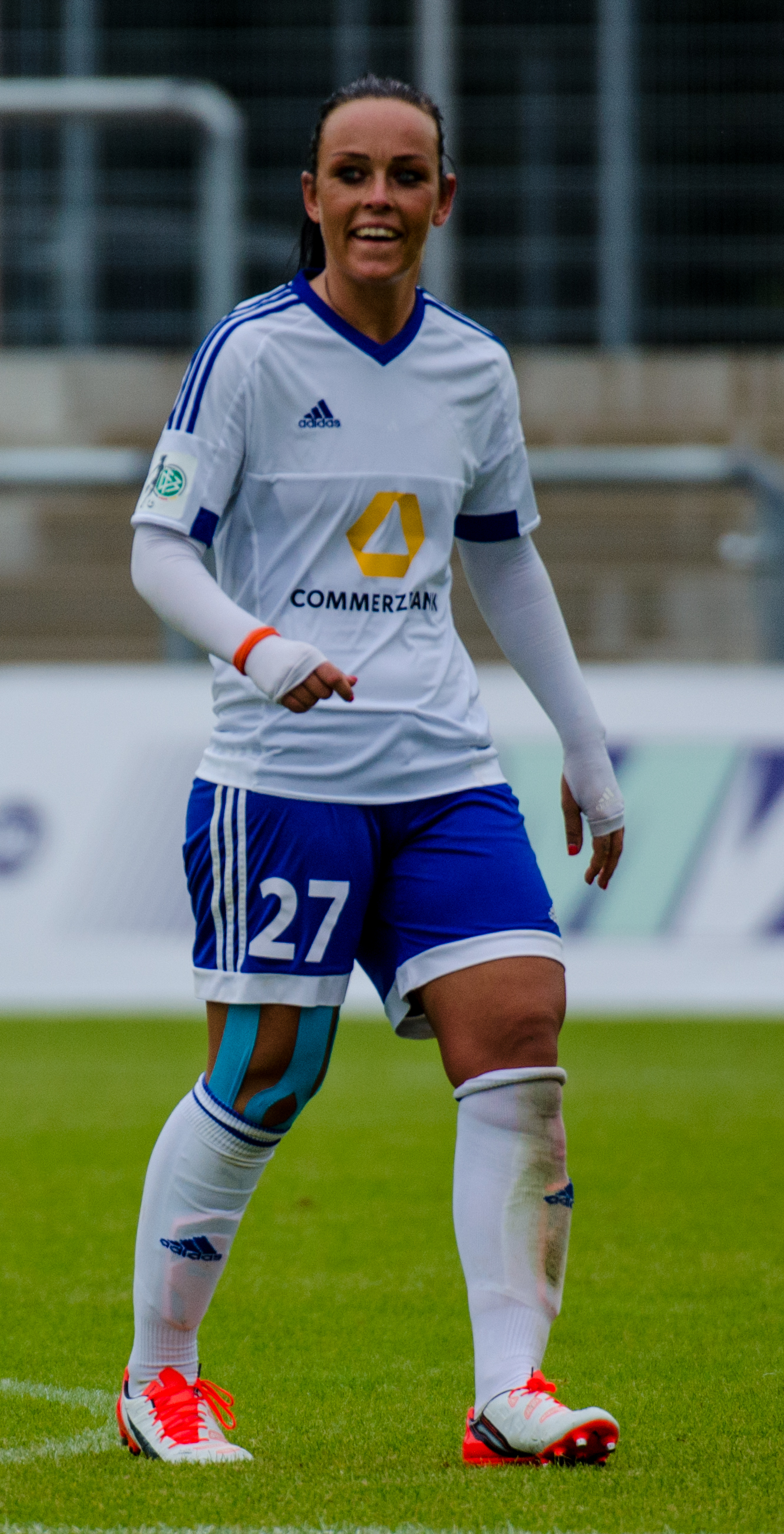
- Kuznik during a league match in September 2015

Personal information
- Full name: Peggy Kuznik
- Date of birth: 12 August 1986 (age 40)
- Place of birth: Finsterwalde, East Germany
- Positions: Defender; midfielder

Youth career
- SV Blau-Weiß Tröbnitz
- 1. FFC Turbine Potsdam

Senior career*
Years	Team	Apps	(Gls)
2002–2007	1.FFC Turbine Potsdam	94	(5)
2008–2009	Lokomotive Leipzig	21	(8)
2009–2013	SC 07 Bad Neuenahr	79	(9)
2013	VfL Wolfsburg	0	(0)
2013–2017	1.FFC Frankfurt	74	(9)
2017–2021	FC Köln	89	(14)

International career^{‡}
2000–2002	Germany U-17	15	(1)
2002–2005	Germany U-19	30	(2)
2006	Germany U-21	1	(0)
- * Club domestic league appearances and goals as of 25 June 2020 ‡ National team caps and goals as of 5 February 2008

Peggy Nietgen (née Kuznik; born 12 August 1986) is a German football defender.

== Career ==
Kuznik began her career at the age of five at SV Blau-Weiß Tröbitz. She joined the academy of 1. FFC Turbine Potsdam in 2000. Upon graduation in 2002, she became a permanent member of Turbine's first team. Kuznik has won the national championship seven times and the national cup nine times, over the course of spells at Potsdam, Lokomotive Leipzig, SC 07 Bad Neuenahr and 1.FFC Frankfurt. Kuznik also had signed for VfL Wolfsburg in 2013, but cancelled her contract before making any appearances for the club.

Kuznik has won the UEFA Women's Cup in 2005, the German championship in 2004 and 2006 and the German cup in 2004, 2005, 2006 and 2014. She also won the under-19 World Cup in 2004.

== Honors ==
FFC Frankfurt

- UEFA Women's Champions League: 2014–15
