= Christina Zerbe =

German footballer (born 1980)

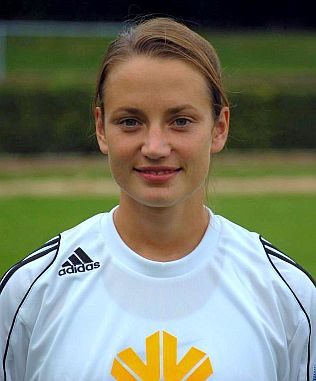
- Christina Zerbe in FFC Frankfurt kit

Personal information
- Date of birth: 12 September 1980 (age 46)
- Place of birth: Siegen, West Germany
- Height: 1.68 m (5 ft 6 in)
- Position: Defender

Team information
- Current team: 1. FFC Frankfurt

Youth career
- 1997–2001: Sportfreunde Siegen
- 2001–2002: FFC Brauweiler Pulheim

Senior career*
Years	Team	Apps	(Gls)
2002–2010	1. FFC Frankfurt	57	(2)

International career
1998–1999	Germany U-19	19	(0)
2000–2003	Germany	12	(0)
- * Club domestic league appearances and goals

Christina Zerbe (born 12 September 1980) is a German footballer. She played for 1. FFC Frankfurt, until 2010, and was capped 12 times for the German national team between 2000 and 2003.

== Career ==
=== Club ===
- TSV Aue-Wingeshausen (1995–1996)
- Sportfreunde Birkelbach (1996–1997)
- Sportfreunde Siegen (1997–2001)
- FFC Brauweiler Pulheim (2001–2002)
- 1. FFC Frankfurt (2002–2010)
- SG Bornheim Grün-Weiss (2010–2011)

=== International ===
- Germany U-19 (1998–1999)
- Germany (2000–2003)

== Achievements ==
=== Club ===
==== 1. FFC Frankfurt ====
- UEFA Women's Champions League (2006)
- Bundesliga (2003, 2005, 2007)
- DFB-Pokal (2003, 2007)

== Personal life ==
Zerbe teaches at the Engelbert Humperdinck elementary school, Frankfurt.
