= Ralf Kellermann =

German footballer and coach

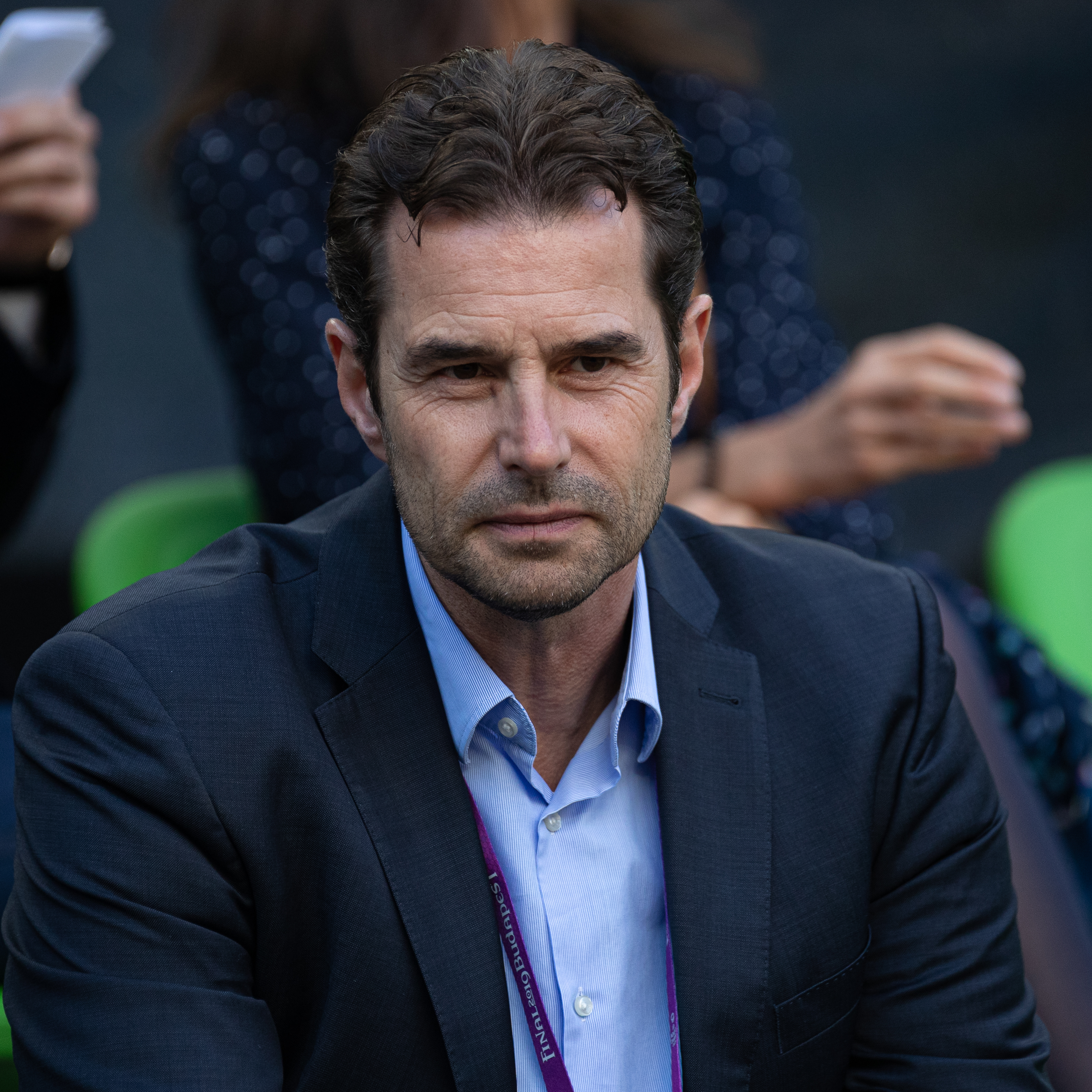
- Kellermann in 2019

Personal information
- Date of birth: 24 September 1968 (age 58)
- Place of birth: Duisburg, West Germany
- Height: 1.88 m (6 ft 2 in)
- Position: Goalkeeper

Youth career
- TuS Cappel
- MSV Duisburg

Senior career*
Years	Team	Apps	(Gls)
1988–1993	MSV Duisburg	2	(0)
1993–1995	FSV Frankfurt		
1995–1997	SC Verl		
1997–2000	Sportfreunde Siegen		
2000–2002	SC Paderborn	44	(0)
2002–2004	SV Lippstadt	49	(0)

Managerial career
- 2008–2017: Wolfsburg women
- * Club domestic league appearances and goals

Ralf Kellermann (born 24 September 1968) is a German former football player and manager.

He was appointed to the coaching position in summer 2008 and in 2011 his contract was extended until 2014, finishing duties in 2017.

== Coaching ==
With Wolfsburg he won the treble in 2013: the Bundesliga, the DFB-Cup and the UEFA Women's Champions League.
