= Hans-Jürgen Tritschoks =

German football manager

Personal information
- Date of birth: 9 November 1955 (age 70)

Managerial career
- Years: Team
- 2000-2002: FFC Brauweiler Pulheim
- 2004-2008: 1. FFC Frankfurt

Hans-Jürgen Tritschoks (born 9 November 1955) is a German football manager. He was the manager of women’s Bundesliga sides FFC Brauweiler Pulheim from 2000 to 2002 and 1. FFC Frankfurt from 2004 to 2008.

His teams won the UEFA Women's Cup in 2006 and 2008, the German championship in 2005, 2007 and 2008 and the German Cup in 2007 and 2008.
