= Fritz Walter Medal =

Annual award given by the German Football Association

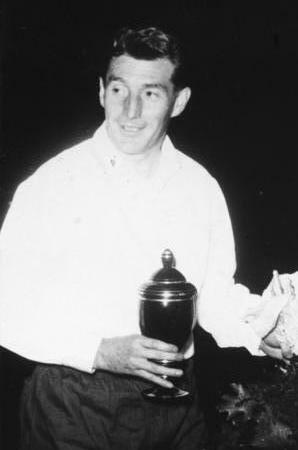
Fritz Walter

The Fritz Walter Medal is a series of annual awards given by the German Football Association to youth footballers in Germany. First awarded in 2005, it is named in honour of Fritz Walter, captain of West Germany's 1954 FIFA World Cup-winning team.

== Winners ==
=== 2005 ===
	Under-19	Under-18	Under-17	Female
Gold	Florian Müller (Bayern Munich)	Marc-André Kruska (Borussia Dortmund)	Sergej Evljuskin (VfL Wolfsburg)	Anja Mittag (1. FFC Turbine Potsdam)
Silver	Manuel Neuer (Schalke 04)	Sören Halfar (Hannover 96)	Daniel Halfar (1. FC Kaiserslautern)	Patricia Hanebeck (FCR 2001 Duisburg)
Bronze	Eugen Polanski (Borussia Mönchengladbach)	Kevin-Prince Boateng (Hertha BSC)	Sebastian Tyrała (Borussia Dortmund)	Célia Okoyino da Mbabi (SC 07 Bad Neuenahr)

=== 2006 ===
	Under-19	Under-18	Under-17	Female
Gold	Kevin-Prince Boateng (Hertha BSC)	Sergej Evljuskin (VfL Wolfsburg)	Lars Bender (1860 Munich)	Anna Blässe (FF USV Jena)
Silver	Robert Fleßers (Borussia Mönchengladbach)	Alexander Eberlein (1860 Munich)	Marko Marin (Borussia Mönchengladbach)	Nadine Keßler (1. FC Saarbrücken)
Bronze	Daniel Adlung (SpVgg Greuther Fürth)	José-Alex Ikeng (VfB Stuttgart)	Sven Bender (1860 Munich)	Stefanie Draws (FFV Neubrandenburg)

=== 2007 ===
	Under-19	Under-18	Under-17	Female
Gold	Benedikt Höwedes (Schalke 04)	Marko Marin (Borussia Mönchengladbach)	Patrick Funk (VfB Stuttgart)	Babett Peter (1. FFC Turbine Potsdam)
Silver	Manuel Konrad (SC Freiburg)	Eric Maxim Choupo-Moting (Hamburger SV)	Konstantin Rausch (Hannover 96)	Katharina Baunach (Bayern Munich)
Bronze	Jérôme Boateng (Hamburger SV)	Stefan Reinartz (Bayer Leverkusen)	Nils Teixeira (Bayer Leverkusen)	Bianca Schmidt (1. FFC Turbine Potsdam)

=== 2008 ===
	Under-19	Under-18	Under-17	Female
Gold	Dennis Diekmeier (Werder Bremen)	Toni Kroos (Bayern Munich)	Manuel Gulde (TSG Hoffenheim)	Jana Burmeister (FF USV Jena)
Silver	Florian Jungwirth (1860 Munich)	Sebastian Rudy (VfB Stuttgart)	Lennart Hartmann (Hertha BSC)	Kim Kulig (VfL Sindelfingen)
Bronze	Marcel Risse (Bayer Leverkusen)	Richard Sukuta-Pasu (Bayer Leverkusen)	Shervin Radjabali-Fardi (Hertha BSC)	Valeria Kleiner (SC Freiburg)

=== 2009 ===
	Under-19	Under-18	Under-17	Female
Gold	Lewis Holtby (Schalke 04)	Marco Terrazzino (TSG Hoffenheim)	Mario Götze (Borussia Dortmund)	Marina Hegering (FCR 2001 Duisburg)
Silver	Konstantin Rausch (Hannover 96)	Sören Bertram (Hamburger SV)	Reinhold Yabo (1. FC Köln)	Alexandra Popp (FCR 2001 Duisburg)
Bronze	André Schürrle (Mainz 05)	Felix Kroos (Hansa Rostock)	Marc-André ter Stegen (Borussia Mönchengladbach)	Dzsenifer Marozsán (1. FFC Frankfurt)

=== 2010 ===
	Under-19	Under-18	Under-17	Female
Gold	Peniel Mlapa (1860 Munich)	Mario Götze (Borussia Dortmund)	Timo Horn (1. FC Köln)	Svenja Huth (1. FFC Frankfurt)
Silver	Stefan Bell (Mainz 05)	Reinhold Yabo (1. FC Köln)	André Hoffmann (MSV Duisburg)	Ramona Petzelberger (SC 07 Bad Neuenahr)
Bronze	Shervin Radjabali-Fardi (Hertha BSC)	Matthias Zimmermann (Karlsruher SC)	Kolja Pusch (Bayer Leverkusen)	Kyra Malinowski (SG Essen-Schönebeck)

=== 2011 ===
	Under-19	Under-18	Under-17	Female
Gold	Marc-André ter Stegen (Borussia Mönchengladbach)	Julian Draxler (Schalke 04)	Emre Can (Bayern Munich)	Johanna Elsig (Bayer Leverkusen)
Silver	Matthias Zimmermann (Karlsruher SC)	Sonny Kittel (Eintracht Frankfurt)	Robin Yalçın (VfB Stuttgart)	Luisa Wensing (FCR 2001 Duisburg)
Bronze	Kevin Volland (1860 Munich)	Markus Mendler (1. FC Nürnberg)	Odisseas Vlachodimos (VfB Stuttgart)	Melanie Leupolz (SC Freiburg)

=== 2012 ===
	Under-19	Under-18	Under-17	Female
Gold	Antonio Rüdiger (VfB Stuttgart)	Matthias Ginter (SC Freiburg)	Leon Goretzka (VfL Bochum)	Lena Lotzen (Bayern Munich)
Silver	Andre Hoffmann (MSV Duisburg)	Thomas Pledl (1860 Munich)	Max Meyer (Schalke 04)	Lina Magull (FSV Gütersloh 2009)
Bronze	Patrick Rakovsky (1. FC Nürnberg)	Dominik Kohr (Bayer Leverkusen)	Pascal Itter (1. FC Nürnberg)	Sara Däbritz (SC Freiburg)

=== 2013 ===
	Under-19	Under-18	Under-17	Female
Gold	Matthias Ginter (SC Freiburg)	Kevin Akpoguma (TSG Hoffenheim)	Timo Werner (VfB Stuttgart)	Melanie Leupolz (SC Freiburg)
Silver	Yannick Gerhardt (1. FC Köln)	Joshua Kimmich (RB Leipzig)	Julian Brandt (VfL Wolfsburg)	Sara Däbritz (SC Freiburg)
Bronze	Dominik Kohr (Bayer Leverkusen)	Anthony Syhre (Hertha BSC)	Donis Avdijaj (Schalke 04)	Franziska Jaser (Bayern Munich)

=== 2014 ===
	Under-19	Under-18	Under-17	Female
Gold	Niklas Stark (1. FC Nürnberg)	Julian Brandt (Bayer Leverkusen)	Benedikt Gimber (TSG Hoffenheim)	Sara Däbritz (SC Freiburg)
Silver	Max Meyer (Schalke 04)	Levin Öztunalı (Bayer Leverkusen)	Damir Bektic (Hertha BSC)	Pauline Bremer (1. FFC Turbine Potsdam)
Bronze	Joshua Kimmich (RB Leipzig)	Jonas Föhrenbach (SC Freiburg)	Timo Königsmann (Hannover 96)	Jasmin Sehan (VfL Wolfsburg)

=== 2015 ===
	Under-19	Under-17	Female
Gold	Jonathan Tah (Bayer Leverkusen)	Felix Passlack (Borussia Dortmund)	Pauline Bremer (1. FFC Turbine Potsdam)
Silver	Timo Werner (VfB Stuttgart)	Niklas Dorsch (Bayern Munich)	Nina Ehegötz (1. FC Köln)
Bronze	Lukas Klostermann (RB Leipzig)	Constantin Frommann (SC Freiburg)	Laura Freigang (TSV Schott Mainz)

=== 2016 ===
	Under-19	Under-17	Female
Gold	Benjamin Henrichs (Bayer Leverkusen)	Gian-Luca Itter (VfL Wolfsburg)	Nina Ehegötz (1. FC Köln)
Silver	Philipp Ochs (TSG Hoffenheim)	Kai Havertz (Bayer Leverkusen)	Anna Gerhardt (Bayern Munich)
Bronze	Maximilian Mittelstädt (Hertha BSC)	Arne Maier (Hertha BSC)	Tanja Pawollek (1. FFC Frankfurt)

=== 2017 ===
	Under-19	Under-17	Female
Gold	Salih Özcan (1. FC Köln)	Fiete Arp (Hamburger SV)	Jana Feldkamp (SGS Essen)
Silver	Aymen Barkok (Eintracht Frankfurt)	Manuel Mbom (Werder Bremen)	Janina Minge (SC Freiburg)
Bronze	Gökhan Gül (Fortuna Düsseldorf)	Lars Lukas Mai (Bayern Munich)	Sophia Kleinherne (1. FFC Frankfurt)

=== 2018 ===
	Under-19	Under-17	Female
Gold	Kai Havertz (Bayer Leverkusen)	Noah Katterbach (1. FC Köln)	Tanja Pawollek (1. FFC Frankfurt)
Silver	Arne Maier (Hertha BSC)	Oliver Batista-Meier (Bayern Munich)	Sophia Kleinherne (1. FFC Frankfurt)
Bronze	Manuel Wintzheimer (Hamburger SV)	Luca Unbehaun (Borussia Dortmund)	Lena Oberdorf (SGS Essen)

=== 2019 ===
	Under-19	Under-17	Female
Gold	Nicolas-Gerrit Kühn (Ajax)	Karim Adeyemi (FC Liefering)	Klara Bühl (SC Freiburg)
Silver	Josha Vagnoman (Hamburger SV)	Jordan Meyer (VfB Stuttgart)	Lena Oberdorf (SGS Essen)
Bronze	Yann Aurel Bisseck (1. FC Köln)	Lazar Samardžić (Hertha BSC)	Gia Corley (Bayern Munich)

=== 2020 ===
	Under-19	Under-17	Female
Gold	Noah Katterbach (1. FC Köln)	Florian Wirtz (Bayer Leverkusen)	Lena Oberdorf (VfL Wolfsburg)
Silver	Kevin Ehlers (Dynamo Dresden)	Torben Rhein (Bayern Munich)	Gia Corley (TSG Hoffenheim)
Bronze	Frederik Jäkel (RB Leipzig)	Luca Netz (Hertha BSC)	Carlotta Wamser (SGS Essen)

=== 2021 and 2022 ===
Due to the ongoing COVID-19 pandemic, the 2021 and 2022 awards both took place in 2022.

	Under-19 (born 2002)	Under-17 (born 2004)	Female Under-19 (born 2002)	Female Under-17 (born 2004)
Gold	Karim Adeyemi (Borussia Dortmund)	Youssoufa Moukoko (Borussia Dortmund)	Jule Brand (VfL Wolfsburg)	Clara Fröhlich (Bayer Leverkusen)
Silver	Ansgar Knauff (Eintracht Frankfurt)	Linus Gechter (Hertha BSC)	Julia Kassen (VfL Wolfsburg)	Vanessa Diehm (TSG Hoffenheim)
Bronze	Noah Atubolu (SC Freiburg)	Anton Kade (FC Basel)	Sophie Weidauer (Turbine Potsdam)	Cora Zicai (SC Freiburg)

	Under-19 (born 2003)	Under-17 (born 2005)	Female Under-19 (born 2003)	Female Under-17 (born 2005)
Gold	Florian Wirtz (Bayer Leverkusen)	Nelson Weiper (Mainz 05)	Lisanne Gräwe (Bayer Leverkusen)	Jella Veit (Eintracht Frankfurt)
Silver	Luca Netz (Borussia Mönchengladbach)	Laurin Ulrich (VfB Stuttgart)	Carlotta Wamser (Eintracht Frankfurt)	Mara Alber (TSG Hoffenheim)
Bronze	Robert Wagner (SC Freiburg)	Tarek Buchmann (Bayern Munich)	Sarah Mattner-Trembleau (First Vienna FC)	Mathilde Janzen (TSG Hoffenheim)

=== 2023 ===
	Under-19 (born 2004)	Under-17 (born 2006)	Female Under-19 (born 2004)	Female Under-17 (born 2006)
Gold	Youssoufa Moukoko (Borussia Dortmund)	Paris Brunner (Borussia Dortmund)	Franziska Kett (Bayern Munich)	Alara Şehitler (Bayern Munich)
Silver	Brajan Gruda (Mainz 05)	Noah Darvich (SC Freiburg)	Vanessa Diehm (TSG Hoffenheim)	Emily Wallrabenstein (Eintracht Frankfurt)
Bronze	Umut Tohumcu (TSG Hoffenheim)	Assan Ouédraogo (Schalke 04)	Dilara Acikgöz (Eintracht Frankfurt)	Melina Krüger (Hamburger SV)

=== 2024 ===
	Under-19 (born 2005)	Under-17 (born 2007)	Female Under-19 (born 2005)	Female Under-17 (born 2007)
Gold	Tom Bischof (TSG Hoffenheim)	Francis Onyeka (Bayer Leverkusen)	Loreen Bender (Bayer Leverkusen)	Merle Hokamp (FSV Gütersloh 2009)
Silver	Dženan Pejčinović (Fortuna Düsseldorf)	Kilian Sauck (Borussia Mönchengladbach)	Rebecca Adamczyk (SC Freiburg)	Greta Hünten (Bayern Munich II)
Bronze	Elias Baum (SV Elversberg)	Boris Lum (Hertha BSC)	Jella Veit (Eintracht Frankfurt)	Laila Portella (Bayern Munich II)

=== 2025 ===
	Under-19 (born 2006)	Under-17 (born 2008)	Female Under-19 (born 2006)	Female Under-17 (born 2008)
Gold	Finn Jeltsch (VfB Stuttgart)	Alexander Staff (Eintracht Frankfurt)	Alara Şehitler (Bayern Munich)	Luzie Zähringer (Bayern Munich)
Silver	Said El Mala (1. FC Köln)	Lennart Karl (Bayern Munich)	Estrella Merino (Bayer Leverkusen)	Lotta Wrede (Hamburger SV)
Bronze	Max Moerstedt (TSG Hoffenheim)	Elias Vali Fard (Borussia Mönchengladbach)	Thea Farwick (SV Meppen)	Marie Gmeineder (Bayern Munich)

=== 2026 ===
	Under-19 (born 2007)	Under-17 (born 2009)	Female Under-19 (born 2007)	Female Under-17 (born 2009)
Gold	Francis Onyeka (SV Elversberg)	Kennet Eichhorn (Bayer Leverkusen)	Maj Schneider (SC Freiburg)	Mirja Kropp (RB Leipzig)
Silver	Boris Mamuzah Lum (Hertha BSC)	Cassiano Kiala (Bayern Munich)	Janne Krumme (Eintracht Frankfurt)	Johanna Hebben (SC Freiburg)
Bronze	Mick Schmetgens (Werder Bremen)	Louis Lemke (Hamburger SV)	Felicia Sträßer (Werder Bremen)	Marie Kleemann (RB Leipzig)
