= 2019 UEFA Women's Under-17 Championship =

European youth association football tournament

Европейско първенство по футбол за жени до 17 години 2019

Tournament details
- Host country: Bulgaria
- Dates: 5–17 May
- Teams: 8 (from 1 confederation)
- Venues: 3 (in 3 host cities)

Final positions
- Champions: Germany (7th title)
- Runners-up: Netherlands

Tournament statistics
- Matches played: 15
- Goals scored: 47 (3.13 per match)
- Top scorer(s): (Netherlands) Nikita Tromp (6 goals)

The 2019 UEFA Women's Under-17 Championship (also known as UEFA Women's Under-17 Euro 2019) was the 12th edition of the UEFA Women's Under-17 Championship, the annual international youth football championship organised by UEFA for the women's under-17 national teams of Europe. Bulgaria, which were selected by UEFA on 9 December 2016, hosted the tournament from 5 to 17 May 2019.

A total of eight teams played in the tournament, with players born on or after 1 January 2002 eligible to participate. Starting from this season, up to five substitutions are permitted per team in each match. Moreover, each match has a regular duration of 90 minutes, instead of 80 minutes in previous seasons.

Germany won their seventh title after beating Netherlands on penalties. Spain were the defending champions and were knocked out from the tournament by Netherlands in the semifinal.

== Qualification ==
A total of 47 UEFA nations entered the competition (including Albania who entered for the first time), and with the hosts Bulgaria qualifying automatically, the other 46 teams competed in the qualifying competition to determine the remaining seven spots in the final tournament. The qualifying competition consisted of two rounds: Qualifying round, which took place in autumn 2018, and Elite round, which took place in spring 2019.

=== Qualified teams ===
The following teams qualified for the final tournament.

Team	Method of qualification	Appearance	Last appearance	Previous best performance
Bulgaria	Hosts	1st	—	Debut
England	Elite round Group 1 winners	7th	2018 (fourth place)	Third place (2016)
Netherlands	Elite round Group 2 winners	4th	2018 (group stage)	Fourth place (2010), Semi-finals (2017)
Spain	Elite round Group 3 winners	10th	2018 (champions)	Champions (2010, 2011, 2015, 2018)
Germany	Elite round Group 4 winners	11th	2018 (runners-up)	Champions (2008, 2009, 2012, 2014, 2016, 2017)
Portugal	Elite round Group 5 winners	2nd	2014 (group stage)	Group stage (2014)
Denmark	Elite round Group 6 winners	3rd	2012 (third place)	Third place (2008, 2012)
Austria	Elite round Group 7 winners	2nd	2014 (group stage)	Group stage (2014)

=== Final draw ===
The final draw was held on 5 April 2019, 11:30 EEST (UTC+3), at the Flamingo Grand Hotel & Spa in Albena, Bulgaria. The eight teams were drawn into two groups of four teams. There was no seeding, except that the hosts Bulgaria were assigned to position A1 in the draw.

== Venues ==
2019 UEFA Women's Under-17 Championship venues

The tournament would originally be held in four venues, but because the condition of the pitch in Balchik was too poor only three were used:

Stadium	City	Capacity
Albena	Albena	3,000
Balchik	Balchik	3,100
Druzhba	Dobrich	12,500
Kavarna	Kavarna	5,000

== Squads ==
Each national team have to submit a squad of 20 players (Regulations Article 39).

== Group stage ==
The final tournament schedule was announced on 12 April 2019.

The group winners and runners-up advance to the semi-finals.

Tiebreakers

In the group stage, teams are ranked according to points (3 points for a win, 1 point for a draw, 0 points for a loss), and if tied on points, the following tiebreaking criteria are applied, in the order given, to determine the rankings (Regulations Articles 17.01 and 17.02):

1. Points in head-to-head matches among tied teams;
2. Goal difference in head-to-head matches among tied teams;
3. Goals scored in head-to-head matches among tied teams;
4. If more than two teams are tied, and after applying all head-to-head criteria above, a subset of teams are still tied, all head-to-head criteria above are reapplied exclusively to this subset of teams;
5. Goal difference in all group matches;
6. Goals scored in all group matches;
7. Penalty shoot-out if only two teams have the same number of points, and they met in the last round of the group and are tied after applying all criteria above (not used if more than two teams have the same number of points, or if their rankings are not relevant for qualification for the next stage);
8. Disciplinary points (red card = 3 points, yellow card = 1 point, expulsion for two yellow cards in one match = 3 points);
9. UEFA coefficient for the qualifying round draw;
10. Drawing of lots.

All times are local, EEST (UTC+3).

=== Group A ===
Pos	Team	Pld	W	D	L	GF	GA	GD	Pts	Qualification
1	Spain	3	2	1	0	9	0	+9	7	Knockout stage
2	Portugal	3	2	0	1	4	7	−3	6	Knockout stage
3	Denmark	3	1	1	1	2	1	+1	4	
4	Bulgaria (H)	3	0	0	3	1	8	−7	0	

Source: UEFA
Rules for classification: Group stage tiebreakers
(H) Hosts
5 May 2019
14:00

Bulgaria	1–3	Portugal
Parapunova 45+1'	Report	Alagoa 6'; Bessette 29' (o.g.); Negrão 77'

Druzhba Stadium, Dobrich
Attendance: 3,000
Referee: Aleksandra Česen (Slovenia)
5 May 2019
16:30

Spain	0–0	Denmark
	Report

Kavarna Stadium, Kavarna
Referee: Sabina Bolić (Croatia)

8 May 2019
11:30

Bulgaria	0–3	Spain
	Report	Sanchez 42'; Lloris 47'; Paralluelo 72'

Druzhba Stadium, Dobrich
Referee: Iuliana Demetrescu (Romania)
8 May 2019
14:00

Denmark	0–1	Portugal
	Report	Ferreira 90+2'

Albena Stadium, Albena
Referee: Vera Opeykina (Russia)

11 May 2019
11:30

Denmark	2–0	Bulgaria
Kramer 9'; Storm 76'	Report

Druzhba Stadium, Dobrich
Referee: Henrikke Nervik (Norway)
11 May 2019
11:30

Portugal	0–6	Spain
	Report	Paralluelo 26', 58', 60'; Lloris 44', 63'; Gutiérrez 77'

Albena Stadium, Albena
Referee: Reelika Turi (Estonia)

=== Group B ===
Pos	Team	Pld	W	D	L	GF	GA	GD	Pts	Qualification
1	Germany	3	2	0	1	9	4	+5	6 (Note: Head-to-head goal difference: Germany +3, Netherlands –1, England –2)	Knockout stage
2	Netherlands	3	2	0	1	7	5	+2	6	Knockout stage
3	England	3	2	0	1	4	5	−1	6	
4	Austria	3	0	0	3	3	9	−6	0	

Source: UEFA
Rules for classification: Group stage tiebreakers
Notes:
5 May 2019
11:30

Austria	1–4	Netherlands
Schasching 8' (pen.)	Report	Stiekema 13'; Tromp 18', 31', 90+6'

Kavarna Stadium, Kavarna
Referee: Henrikke Nervik (Norway)
5 May 2019
14:00

England	0–4	Germany
	Report	Bernhardt 12' (pen.); Woldmann 23'; Weidauer 31'; Gräwe 90+2'

Albena Stadium, Albena
Referee: Iuliana Demetrescu (Romania)

8 May 2019
14:00

Germany	2–3	Netherlands
Rohde 24'; Wamser 81'	Report	De Keijzer 25'; Van Diemen 30'; Tromp 43' (pen.)

Kavarna Stadium, Kavarna
Referee: Aleksandra Česen (Slovenia)
8 May 2019
16:30

Austria	1–2	England
Schasching 29' (pen.)	Report	Johnson 15'; Robinson 35'

Druzhba Stadium, Dobrich
Referee: Reelika Turi (Estonia)

11 May 2019
16:30

Germany	3–1	Austria
Wamser 17', 69'; Weidauer 39'	Report	Edlinger 90+3'

Albena Stadium, Albena
Referee: Sabina Bolić (Croatia)
11 May 2019
16:30

Netherlands	0–2	England
	Report	Robinson 46'; Matthews 52'

Kavarna Stadium, Kavarna
Referee: Vera Opeykina (Russia)

== Knockout stage ==
In the knockout stage, penalty shoot-out is used to decide the winner if necessary (no extra time is played).

=== Bracket ===
Semi-finals
14 May – Kavarna
Spain	1
Netherlands	3
14 May – Dobrich
Germany	2
Portugal	0

Final
17 May – Albena
Netherlands	1 (2)
Germany	1 (3)

=== Semi-finals ===
14 May 2019
14:00

Germany	2–0	Portugal
Weidauer 25'; Wamser 50'	Report

Druzhba Stadium, Dobrich
Referee: Vera Opeykina (Russia)

14 May 2019
18:30

Spain	1−3	Netherlands
Lloris 90+2'	Report	De Keijzer 41'; Stiekema 60'; Tromp 86'

Kavarna Stadium, Kavarna
Referee: Sabina Bolić (Croatia)

=== Final ===
17 May 2019
14:00

Netherlands	1–1	Germany
Tromp 21'	Report	Weidauer 19'
Penalties
Tromp (penalty scored); De Vette (penalty scored); Foederer (penalty missed); Loonen (penalty missed); Peddemors (penalty missed); Brugts (penalty missed)	2–3	(penalty scored) Weidauer; (penalty scored) Pollak; (penalty missed) Steck; (penalty missed) Rohde; (penalty missed) Kowalski; (penalty scored) Schiemann

Albena Stadium, Albena
Referee: Iuliana Demetrescu (Romania)

== Goalscorers ==
There were 47 goals scored in 15 matches, for an average of 3.13 goals per match.

6 goals

- (Netherlands) Nikita Tromp

4 goals

- (Germany) Carlotta Wamser
- (Germany) Sophie Weidauer
- (Spain) Silvia Lloris
- (Spain) Salma Paralluelo

2 goals

- (Austria) Annabel Schasching
- (England) Katie Robinson
- (Netherlands) Lotje de Keijzer
- (Netherlands) Iris Stiekema

1 goal

- (Austria) Christina Edlinger
- (Bulgaria) Zdravka Parapunova
- (Denmark) Cornelia Kramer
- (Denmark) Freja Storm
- (England) Lucy Johnson
- (England) Keri Matthews
- (Germany) Emilie Bernhardt
- (Germany) Lisanne Gräwe
- (Germany) Marleen Rohde
- (Germany) Nicole Woldmann
- (Netherlands) Samantha Van Diemen
- (Portugal) Maria Alagoa
- (Portugal) Marta Ferreira
- (Portugal) Maria Negrão
- (Spain) María José Gutiérrez
- (Spain) Carlota Sanchez

1 own goal

- (Bulgaria) Vivianne Bessette (against Portugal)

== Team of the tournament ==
The UEFA technical observers selected the following 11 players for the team of the tournament:

Goalkeeper	Defenders	Midfielders	Forwards
(Germany) Pauline Nelles	(Spain) Jana Fernández; (Spain) Ana Tejada; (Portugal) Sofia Silva; (Germany) Jule Brand	(Netherlands) Dana Foederer; (Germany) Lisanne Gräwe; (Netherlands) Nikita Tromp	(Spain) Asuri Martínez; (Germany) Gia Corley; (Germany) Carlotta Wamser

== International broadcasters ==
=== Television ===
7 of 15 live matches and highlights will be available on UEFA.com and UEFA.tv YouTube channel for all territories around the world.

Note: Live matches on YouTube are not available in Germany, Republic of Ireland, Israel, the Middle East/North Africa, and the United States.

==== Participating nations ====
Country	Broadcaster
Bulgaria (host)	BNT
Austria	ORF
Denmark	DR
Denmark	TV2
Germany	Sport1
Netherlands	NOS
Portugal	RTP
Spain	RTVE
United Kingdom	BBC

==== Non-participating European nations ====
Country/Region	Broadcaster
Albania	RTSH
Andorra	RTVE (Spanish)
Andorra	RMC (French)
France	RMC (French)
Luxembourg	RMC (French)
Luxembourg	RTBF (French)
Belgium	RTBF (French)
Belgium	VRT (Dutch)
Bosnia and Herzegovina; Croatia; Macedonia; Montenegro; Serbia; Slovenia	Sport Klub
Belarus	Belteleradio
Czech Republic	ČT
Faroe Islands	DR
Faroe Islands	TV2
Estonia	ERR
Finland	Yle
Hungary	MTVA
Iceland	RÚV
Ireland	RTÉ (English)
Ireland	TG4 (Irish)
Israel	Charlton
Italy	RAI
San Marino	RAI
Vatican City	RAI
Kosovo	RTK
Latvia	LTV
Liechtenstein	SRG SSR
Switzerland	SRG SSR
Lithuania	LRT
Malta	PBS
Norway	NRK
Norway	TV2
Poland	TVP
Romania	TVR
Russia	Match TV
Slovakia	RTVS
Sweden	SVT
Sweden	TV4
Ukraine	UA:PBC

==== Outside Europe ====
Country/Regional	Broadcaster
China	CCTV
Argentina; Bolivia; Chile; Colombia; Costa Rica; Dominican Republic; Ecuador; El Salvador; Guatemala; Honduras; Mexico; Nicaragua; Panama; Paraguay; Peru; Puerto Rico; Uruguay; Venezuela	ESPN; Univision Deportes (Puerto Rico and USA only)
United States	ESPN; Univision Deportes (Puerto Rico and USA only)
MENA: Algeria; Bahrain; Chad; Comoros; Djibouti; Egypt; Iran; Iraq; Jordan; Kuwait; Lebanon; Libya; Mauritania; Morocco; Oman; Qatar; Saudi Arabia; Somalia; Palestine; Sudan; Syria; Tunisia; United Arab Emirates; Yemen	beIN Sports

=== Radio ===
==== Participating nations ====
Country	Broadcaster
Bulgaria (host)	BNR
Austria	ORF
Denmark	DR
Netherlands	NOS
Portugal	RTP
Spain	RTVE
Spain	COPE
Spain	SER
United Kingdom	BBC

==== Non-participating European nations ====
Country/Region	Broadcaster
Albania	RTSH
Andorra	RTVE (Spanish)
Andorra	COPE (Spanish)
Andorra	SER (Spanish)
Andorra	Radio France (French); RFI (French); Europe 1
France	Radio France (French); RFI (French); Europe 1
Luxembourg	Radio France (French); RFI (French); Europe 1
Luxembourg	Radio 100,7 (Luxembourgish)
Luxembourg	RTBF (French)
Belgium	RTBF (French)
Belgium	VRT (Dutch)
Belarus	Belteleradio
Czech Republic	ČR
Faroe Islands	DR
Estonia	ERR
Finland	Yle
Hungary	MTVA
Iceland	RÚV
Ireland	RTÉ (English and Irish)
Italy	RAI
San Marino	RAI
Vatican City	RAI
Kosovo	RTK
Latvia	LR
Liechtenstein	SRG SSR
Switzerland	SRG SSR
Lithuania	LRT
Malta	PBS
Norway	NRK
Poland	PR
Romania	ROR
Slovakia	RTVS
Sweden	SR
Ukraine	UA:PBC
