= Sophia Winkler =

German footballer (born 2003)

Personal information
- Date of birth: 29 June 2003 (age 23)
- Place of birth: Marl, Germany
- Height: 1.75 m (5 ft 9 in)
- Position: Goalkeeper

Team information
- Current team: Eintracht Frankfurt
- Number: 1

Youth career
- SUS Concordia Flaesheim
- 2017–2020: SGS Essen

Senior career*
Years	Team	Apps	(Gls)
2020–2025	SGS Essen	69	(0)
2025–	Eintracht Frankfurt	0	(0)

International career^{‡}
2021–2022	Germany U19	6	(0)
2024–	Germany	1	(0)
- * Club domestic league appearances and goals as of 16:19, 26 August 2025 (UTC) ‡ National team caps and goals as of 12:38, 30 November 2024 (UTC)

Sophia Winkler (born 29 June 2003) is a German professional footballer who plays as a goalkeeper for Frauen-Bundesliga club Eintracht Frankfurt.

== Career ==
Winkler began her career at SUS Concordia Flaesheim, before switching to the SGS Essen youth ranks at the start of 2017.

In the 2020–21 Bundesliga season, Winkler made her debut for Essen's senior team. Having established herself as the main goalkeeper in 2021, the German kept seven clean sheets during the subsequent campaign. Winkler was rewarded for her 2022–23 performances with a contract extension until 2026.

During the first half of the 2023–24 season, Winkler experienced a streak of three consecutive matches where she kept a clean sheet, coming close to the consecutive clean sheet minutes record of Kim Sindermann.

On 17 February 2025, Winkler signed a four-years contract with Eintracht Frankfurt.

== Career statistics ==
=== International ===
As of 29 November 2024

Appearances and goals by national team and year
National team	Year	Apps	Goals
Germany	2024	1	0
Total		1	0
