= Laura Dick =

German footballer (born 2003)

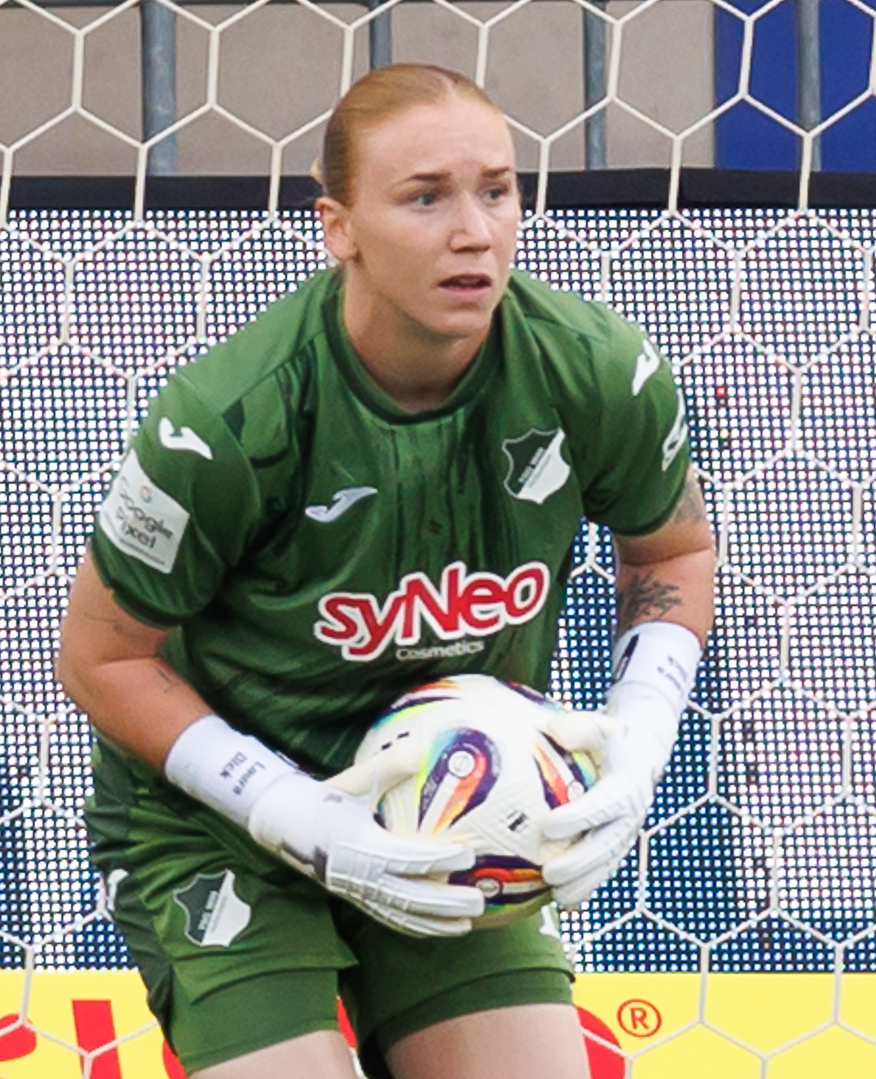
- Dick with TSG Hoffenheim in 2025

Personal information
- Full name: Laura-Johanna Dick
- Date of birth: 13 June 2003 (age 23)
- Place of birth: Saarbrücken, Germany
- Height: 1.77 m (5 ft 10 in)
- Position: Goalkeeper

Team information
- Current team: TSG Hoffenheim
- Number: 1

Youth career
- FV Fischbach
- TuS Jägersfreude
- 2018–2020: TSG Hoffenheim

Senior career*
Years	Team	Apps	(Gls)
2020–2024	TSG Hoffenheim II	31	(0)
2021–	TSG Hoffenheim	68	(0)

International career^{‡}
2017–2018	Germany U15	3	(0)
2019–2020	Germany U17	6	(0)
2021–2022	Germany U19	5	(0)
2024–2025	Germany U23	7	(0)
- * Club domestic league appearances and goals as of 14 November 2026 ‡ National team caps and goals as of 18:57, 24 May 2026 (UTC)

Laura-Johanna Dick (born 13 June 2003) is a German professional footballer who plays as a goalkeeper for Frauen-Bundesliga club TSG Hoffenheim.

== Youth career ==
Dick grew up in Sulzbach, a town in Saarbrücken. She received an education at the Saarland Elite School before leaving home at the age of 14 to advance her career, first with FV Fishbach and then with TuS Jägersfreude. In the summer of 2018, she joined TSG Hoffenheim's under-17 squad. Only 15 years old, she lived with a host family in the nearby town of Sankt Leon-Rot as she continued to train and develop at Hoffenheim.

== Club career ==
In 2020, Dick was promoted to Hoffenheim's second team. She played in 30 2. Frauen-Bundesliga matches from 2021 to 2024, with the bulk of her appearances coming in the 2020–21 season. At the same time, she started gaining experience with Hoffenheim's first team, which she joined officially in 2021. She made her senior debut in a DFB-Pokal match against FC Ingolstadt in November 2020, and her Frauen-Bundesliga debut a year later in a 5–1 win against FC Carl Zeiss Jena on 7 November 2021.

Over the next two years, Dick shadowed Martina Tufekovic, forming a supportive relationship with the Hoffenheim first-choice goalkeeper. Dick extended her contract with Hoffenheim through 2026 on 4 April 2024 after having made 11 appearances in the Bundesliga up to that point. She then went on to seize the starting position from Tufekovic, establishing herself as the new number one goalkeeper early in the 2024–25 season.

In March 2025, Dick contributed to Hoffenheim's run to the DFB-Pokal semifinals, in which they were beaten by Bayern Munich after Dick made a blunder that set up a Bayern comeback victory. The following month, Dick signed a three-year extension with the club through 2028. Hoffenheim head coach Theodoros Dedes praised Dick in November 2025, pointing out her growing confidence and referring to her as the "best German goalkeeper in the league."

== International career ==
Dick kicked off her international career with the Germany under-15 national team, making 3 appearances across two years. In 2019, she was a member of the Germany squad that won the 2019 UEFA Women's Under-17 Championship after beating the Netherlands on penalties in the final; Dick spent the tournament as the backup goalkeeper, behind Pauline Nelles. Three years later, she participated in the 2022 UEFA Women's Under-19 Championship, in which Germany failed to advance from their group. Dick has also played for the Germany U23s.

Despite never having been capped for the Germany senior team, Dick was on the list of standby players for the squad that went on to reach the semifinals of the UEFA Women's Euro 2025. In October 2025, she received her first official call-up to the senior team ahead of two UEFA Women's Nations League matches against France, filling in for the injured Ann-Katrin Berger. Dick's goal is to make the Germany squad for the 2027 FIFA Women's World Cup.
