= Jana Feldkamp =

German footballer

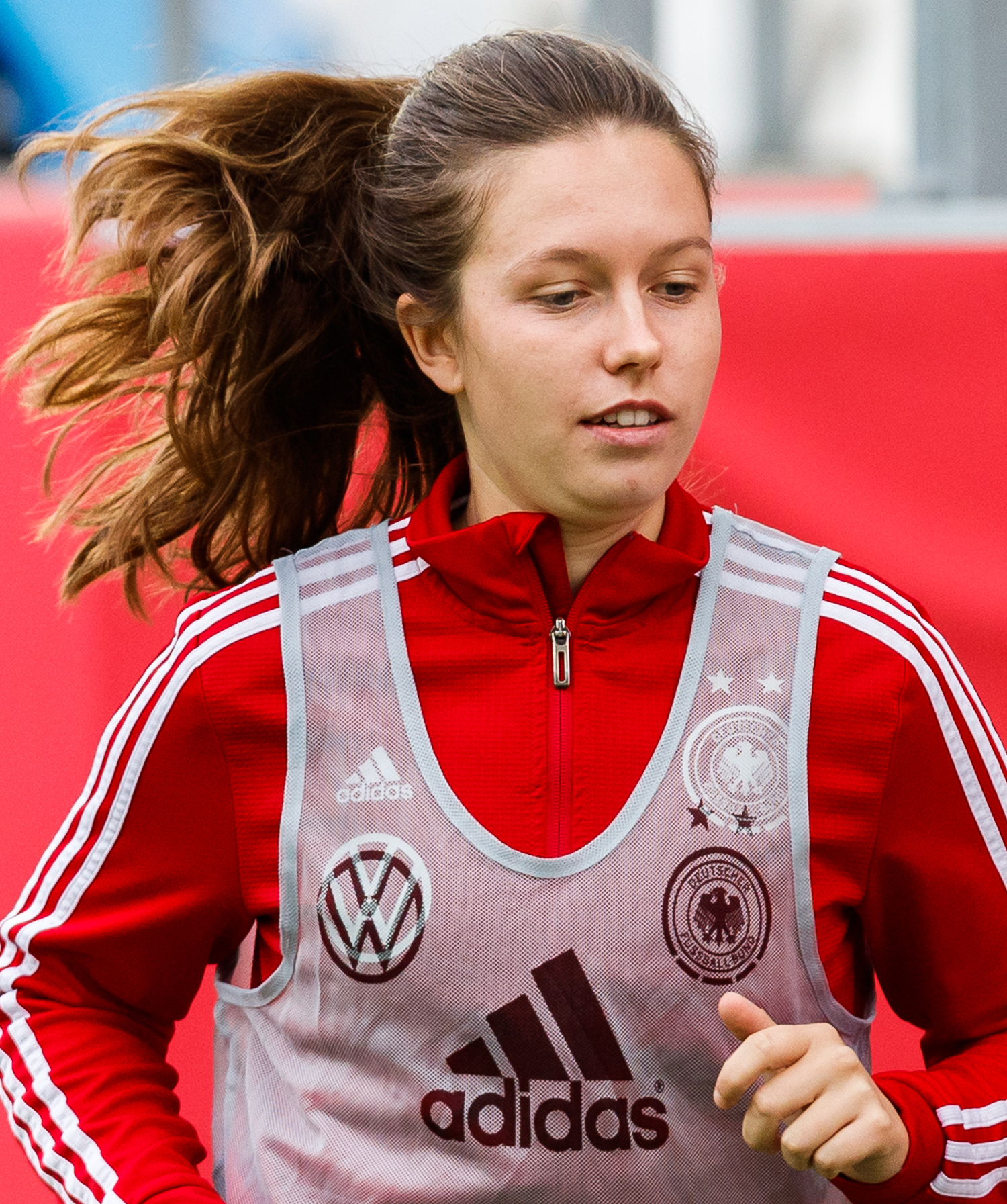
- Feldkamp in 2021

Personal information
- Full name: Jana Feldkamp
- Date of birth: 15 March 1998 (age 28)
- Place of birth: Dinslaken, Germany
- Height: 1.70 m (5 ft 7 in)
- Position: Midfielder

Team information
- Current team: SGS Essen
- Number: 31

Youth career
- –2011: STV Hünxe
- 2011–2015: SGS Essen

Senior career*
Years	Team	Apps	(Gls)
2015–2021	SGS Essen	120	(9)
2021–2025	TSG Hoffenheim	77	(7)
2025-	SGS Essen	20	(0)

International career^{‡}
2013	Germany U15	3	(1)
2013–2014	Germany U16	7	(0)
2014–2015	Germany U17	13	(3)
2015–2017	Germany U19	11	(1)
2016–2018	Germany U20	14	(1)
2021–	Germany	16	(0)
- * Club domestic league appearances and goals as of 22 November 2026 ‡ National team caps and goals as of 11 November 2022 (UTC)

Jana Feldkamp (born 15 March 1998) is a German footballer who plays as a midfielder for SGS Essen and the Germany national team.

== Club career ==
She started playing football in 2004 at her hometown club STV Hünxe, from which she moved to Essen in 2011. Feldkamp played for SGS Essen in the B-Junior Bundesliga from 2013 to 2015 and was promoted to Essen's first division squad in the second half of the 2014/15 season. There she made her debut on 22 February 2015, in an away game at FF USV Jena as a substitute. A week later, she scored her first Bundesliga goal in a 2–0 win against Herforder SV.

In April 2021 she announced she joined TSG 1899 Hoffenheim and signed there until 2023.

In July 2017 Feldkamp was awarded the Fritz Walter Medal by the DFB as the best junior player.

== International career ==
Feldkamp debuted on 17 April 2013, in the German U-15 national team and was later also a regular player in the U-16 and U-17 age groups. Feldkamp took part in the 2016 European Championships in Slovakia for the U-19s and played in all 3 games. With the U-20 selection, she took part in the 2016 World Cup in Papua New Guinea and the 2018 World Cup in France, where Germany reached the quarter-finals. Feldkamp made her international debut for the senior German team on 10 April 2021, starting in the friendly match against Australia. The home match finished as a 5–2 win for Germany.

== Career statistics ==
As of 10 November 2022

Germany
Year	Apps	Goals
2021	8	0
2022	7	0
Total	15	0

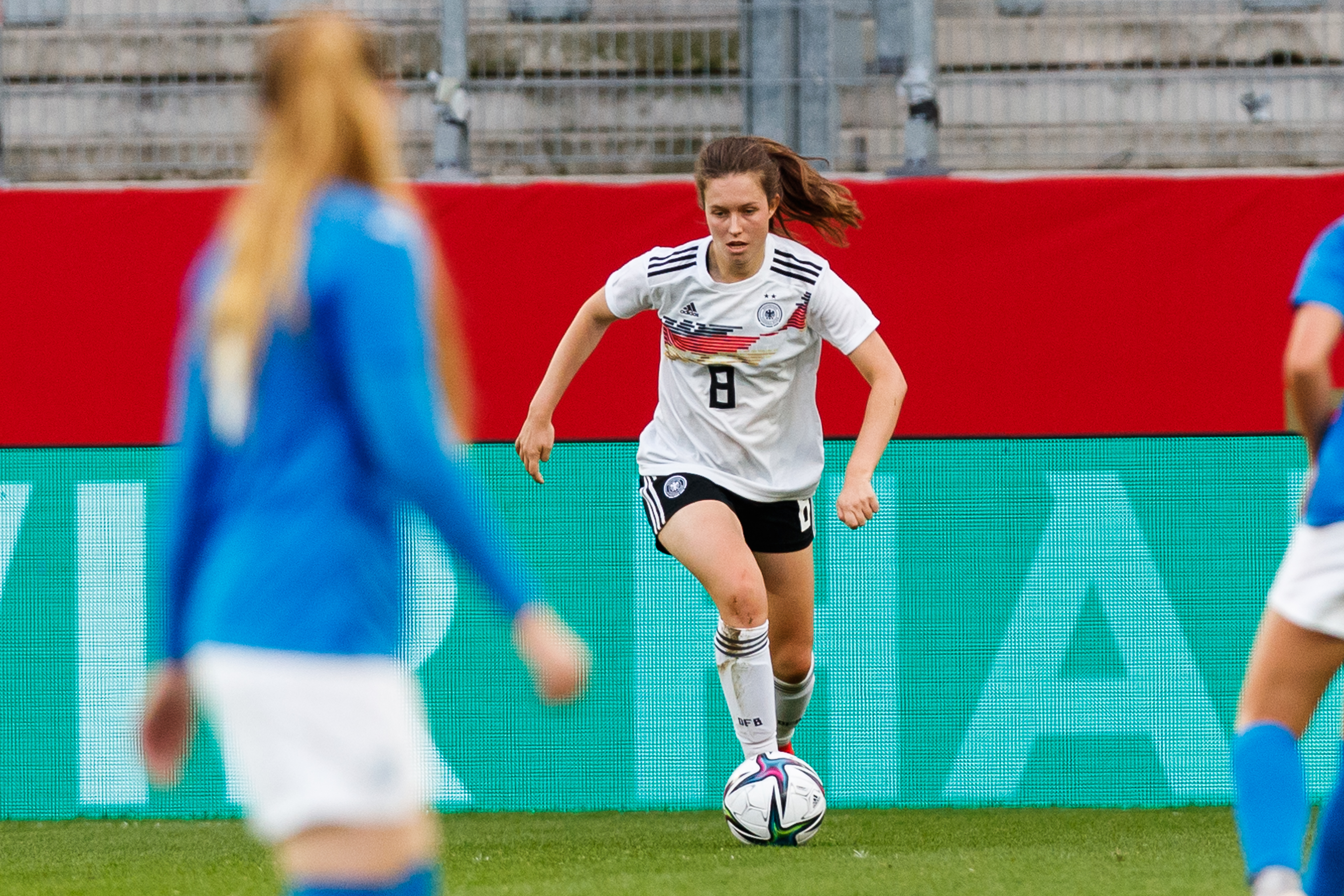
Feldkamp in 2021

== Honours ==
SGS Essen

- DFB-Pokal Frauen runner-up: 2019–20

Individual

- Fritz Walter Medal, Gold: 2017
