= Germany women's national under-23 football team =

National association football team

Germany U-23
- Association: Deutscher Fußball-Bund
- Head coach: Kathrin Peter
- Most caps: Carolin Schiewe (13 caps)
- Top scorer: Sophie Weidauer (5 goals)
| First colours | Second colours |

First international
- Germany 1-0 Norway (Bad Neuenahr-Ahrweiler, Germany; 26 June 2007)

Biggest win
- Finland 0-6 Germany (Lapua, Finland; 22 July 2007)

Biggest defeat
- Germany 0-4 United States (Vaasa, Finland; 24 July 2007)

The Germany women's national under-23 football team represents the female under-23s of Germany and is controlled by the German Football Association, the governing body of football in Germany.

== Results and fixtures ==
The following is a list of match results, as well as any future matches that have been scheduled.

Legend

Win Draw Lose Void or postponed Fixture

== Players ==
=== Current squad ===
The following players were named for the matches against Netherlands and Norway on 4 April and 7 April 2025.

Caps and goals as of 2 May 2025.

| No. | Pos. | Player | Date of birth (age) | Caps | Goals | Club |
|---|---|---|---|---|---|---|
| 1 | GK | Ena Mahmutovic | 23 December 2003 (age 22) | 3 | 0 | (German Football Association) Bayern Munich |
| 12 | GK | Laura Dick | 13 June 2003 (age 23) | 4 | 0 | (German Football Association) TSG Hoffenheim |
| 23 | GK | Rebecca Adamczyk | 3 April 2005 (age 21) | 0 | 0 | (German Football Association) SC Freiburg |
| 2 | DF | Carlotta Wamser | 1 November 2003 (age 23) | 8 | 2 | (German Football Association) Eintracht Frankfurt |
| 3 | DF | Kristin Kögel (captain) | 21 September 1999 (age 27) | 7 | 0 | (German Football Association) Bayer Leverkusen |
| 4 | DF | Vanessa Diehm | 22 March 2004 (age 22) | 6 | 0 | (German Football Association) TSG Hoffenheim |
| 5 | DF | Selina Ostermeier | 15 January 1999 (age 27) | 6 | 0 | (German Football Association) Bayer Leverkusen |
| 13 | DF | Julia Mickenhagen | 10 April 2005 (age 21) | 2 | 0 | (German Football Association) Bayer Leverkusen |
| 14 | DF | Alina Axtmann | 25 June 2005 (age 21) | 1 | 0 | (German Football Association) SC Freiburg |
| 15 | DF | Sara Ritter | 25 July 2005 (age 21) | 1 | 0 | (German Football Association) TSG Hoffenheim |
| 22 | DF | Tomke Schneider | 31 July 2004 (age 22) | 4 | 0 | (German Football Association) Union Berlin |
| 6 | MF | Lisanne Gräwe | 11 February 2003 (age 23) | 2 | 1 | (German Football Association) Eintracht Frankfurt |
| 7 | MF | Loreen Bender | 21 August 2005 (age 21) | 2 | 0 | (German Football Association) Bayer Leverkusen |
| 8 | MF | Sofie Zdebel | 8 August 2004 (age 22) | 6 | 0 | (German Football Association) Bayer Leverkusen |
| 16 | MF | Katharina Piljić | 5 September 2003 (age 23) | 5 | 0 | (German Football Association) Bayer Leverkusen |
| 18 | MF | Mathilde Janzen | 14 February 2005 (age 21) | 2 | 0 | (Swedish Football Association) Kristianstads DFF |
| 21 | DF | Chiara Hahn | 2 January 2002 (age 24) | 0 | 0 | (German Football Association) TSG Hoffenheim |
| 9 | FW | Shekiera Martinez | 4 July 2001 (age 25) | 7 | 1 | (The Football Association) West Ham United |
| 10 | FW | Gia Corley | 20 May 2002 (age 24) | 8 | 1 | (United States Soccer Federation) San Diego Wave |
| 11 | FW | Tuana Mahmoud | 3 March 2003 (age 23) | 8 | 2 | (German Football Association) Werder Bremen |
| 17 | FW | Vanessa Fudalla | 21 October 2001 (age 25) | 4 | 1 | (German Football Association) RB Leipzig |
| 19 | FW | Sophie Weidauer | 10 February 2002 (age 24) | 7 | 5 | (German Football Association) Werder Bremen |
| 20 | FW | Larissa Mühlhaus | 13 January 2003 (age 23) | 6 | 0 | (German Football Association) Werder Bremen |

=== Additional players ===
The following players were named to a squad in the last 12 months.

| Pos. | Player | Date of birth (age) | Caps | Goals | Club | Latest call-up |
