= Damir Bektić =

German footballer

Personal information
- Date of birth: 30 January 1997 (age 29)
- Place of birth: Berlin, Germany
- Height: 1.82 m (6 ft 0 in)
- Position: Midfielder

Team information
- Current team: SV Tasmania Berlin

Youth career
- –2016: Hertha BSC

Senior career*
Years	Team	Apps	(Gls)
2016–2017	Hertha BSC II	12	(0)
2018	Werder Bremen II	1	(0)
2018–2019	FC St. Pauli II	21	(1)
2019–2020	Energie Cottbus	5	(0)
2020–	SV Tasmania Berlin	5	(1)

International career
2013–2014	Germany U17	14	(0)
- * Club domestic league appearances and goals as of 1 July 2021

Damir Bektić (born 30 January 1997) is a German professional footballer who plays as a midfielder for SV Tasmania Berlin.

== Career ==
In May 2018, following Werder Bremen II's relegation from the 3. Liga, it was announced Bektić would be one of ten players to leave the club.

On 30 October 2019, Bektić joined FC Energie Cottbus on a deal for the rest of the season. He had been training with the team for three months after an injury break in the summer.

== International career ==
Born in Germany, Bektić is of Bosnian descent. He is a former youth international for Germany, having played for the Germany U17s.

== Honours ==
Individual

- Fritz Walter Medal U17 Silver: 2014
