= SGS Essen =

German women's football (soccer) club

- Full name: Sportgemeinschaft Essen-Schönebeck 19/68 e. V.
- Founded: 2000; 26 years ago
- Ground: Stadion Essen
- Capacity: 20,000
- Chairman: Helga Sander
- Head coach: Robert Augustin
- League: Frauen-Bundesliga
- 2025–26: Bundesliga, 13th of 14 (relegated)
Home colours	Away colours	Third colours

SGS Essen are a German multi-sports club based in Essen, North Rhine-Westphalia. The club was founded in 2000 from the merger of VfB Borbeck and SC Grün-Weiß Schönebeck. It is most renowned for its women's football team, which plays in the top-tier Frauen-Bundesliga.

== History ==
On 21 March 1973 SC Grün-Weiß Schönebeck established its women's section. After playing for several years in lower leagues, Schönebeck was promoted to the Verbandsliga (III) in 1992. They played in this league until 1999 with an intermezzo in 1996–97, when the club participated for a year in the Regionalliga (II). The promotion to the Regionalliga in 1999 was followed by five years of football in that league until Schönebeck gained promotion to the Bundesliga in 2004.

In the 2002–03 season the club had struggled in the Regionalliga and the aim for the 2003–04 season was to qualify for the 2. Bundesliga, starting in the next season. They won their league though and after a successful qualification round gained promotion to the highest league in German women's football. Since Schönebeck has established itself in the Bundesliga, generally achieving mid-table results. The best result was a 4th place in 2018–19. The team has reached the German cup semi-finals in 2007 and 2010.

The club's biggest success came by reaching the women's cup finals of the 2013–14 DFB-Pokal and the 2019–20 DFB-Pokal.

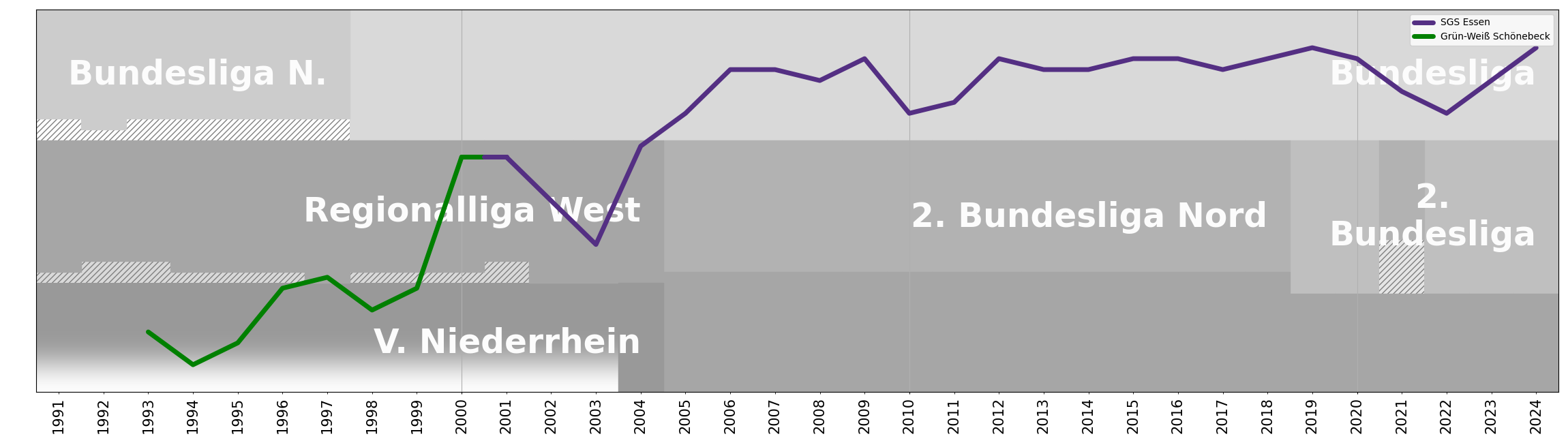
Historical league performance of SGS Essen

== Current squad ==
As of 12 July 2026

Note: Flags indicate national team as defined under FIFA eligibility rules; some limited exceptions apply. Players may hold more than one non-FIFA nationality.

No.	Pos.	Nation	Player
1	GK	GER	Kim Sindermann
2	MF	GER	Julie Terlinden
3	DF	SUI	Joëlle Steiner
4	DF	GER	Teresa Buonarroti
5	DF	GER	Abigail Enobore
6	MF	GER	Jule Schnieder
7	MF	GER	Emilia Watermeier
8	MF	GER	Antonia Baaß
10	MF	GER	Laura Bröring
11	MF	GER	Helen Börner
12	GK	GER	Emilia Navarro
13	FW	HUN	Vanessza Nagy
14	DF	GER	Anja Heuschkel

No.	Pos.	Nation	Player
15	DF	GER	Laura Pucks
17	DF	GER	Karla Brinkmann
18	DF	AUT	Anna Wirnsberger
19	DF	AUT	Selina Albrecht
20	FW	GER	Leonie Köpp
21	MF	GER	Lia Henkelmann
23	FW	GER	Kyra Spitzner
24	GK	GER	Pia Lucassen
26	DF	GER	Lany Mia Bäcker
29	MF	GER	Alexandra Nestel
31	MF	GER	Jana Feldkamp
32	GK	GER	Julia Kassen

=== Former players ===
- (Japan) Kozue Ando (Japanese international)
- (Germany) Nicole Anyomi
- (Hungary) Cecília Gáspár (Hungarian international)
- (Germany) Linda Dallmann
- (Germany) Sara Doorsoun
- (Germany) Marina Hegering
- (Germany) Irini Ioannidou
- (Germany) Turid Knaak
- (Portugal) Ana Leite (Portuguese international)
- (Canada) Emily Zurrer (Canadian international)
- (Greece) Sofia Inguanta (née Nati) (Greek international)
- (Germany) Lena Oberdorf
- (Germany) Lea Schüller
- (Germany) Elisa Senß
- (Germany) Carlotta Wamser
- (Germany) Sophia Winkler
- (Belgium) Shari Van Belle (Belgian international)
