= Albena Stadium =

Football complex in Albena, Bulgaria

Stadion Albena
- Стадион Албена
- Interactive map of Stadion Albena
- Address: 9620 Albena
- Location: Albena, Bulgaria
- Coordinates: 43°22′05″N 28°04′48″E
- Owner: Albena
- Capacity: 3,000; 1,200; 200
- Surface: grass
- Field size: 104 by 68 metres (113.7 yd × 74.4 yd) 91 by 61 metres (99.5 yd × 66.7 yd) 100 by 66 metres (109.4 yd × 72.2 yd) 3x100 by 64 metres (109.4 yd × 70.0 yd)

Website
- albena.bg/bg/futbol

Stadion Albena (Bulgarian: Стадион Албена, English: 'Albena Stadium') is a football complex with 3 football pitches in Albena, Bulgaria. The pitches are built and equipped according to the requirements of the Bulgarian Football Union and UEFA.

== Stadiums ==
=== Stadion Albena 1 ===
Albena Stadium 1 has a 104 × 68 m playing field with a grass area of 112 × 72 m and a seating capacity of 3,000 spectators. The stadium is equipped with benches for players, substitutes, referees, and a doctor, as well as a VIP area with 30 seats and a dedicated catering zone. A full-color LED screen (3 × 2.5 m) provides visual information during events.

The facility includes two fully equipped changing rooms, each featuring a dressing room with 26 lockers and an analysis board, a massage and medical room, showers and toilets, a recovery bath, and air conditioning with central heating. Additional functional spaces include a delegate's room, a referees’ locker room with lockers, showers, and toilets, a medical room, sound room, video control room, press center, and spectator toilets.

=== Stadion Albena 2 ===
Albena Stadium has a 91 × 61 m playing field with a grass area of 94 × 65 m and a seating capacity of 1,200 spectators. The stadium provides benches for players and substitutes, designated places for the referee and doctor, and a scoreboard.

The facility includes two fully equipped changing rooms, each featuring a dressing room with 26 lockers and an analysis board, a massage and medical room, showers and toilets, a recovery bath, and air conditioning with central heating. Additional areas include a delegate's room, a referees’ locker room equipped with lockers, showers, and toilets, a medical room, a sound system, a press center, and toilets for spectators.

=== Stadion Albena 3 ===
Albena Stadium has a 100 × 66 m playing field with a grass area of 110 × 80 m and a seating capacity of 200 spectators. The stadium is equipped with benches for players and substitutes, a bench for the referee and doctor, and a scoreboard.

The facility includes two fully equipped changing rooms, each featuring a dressing room with 26 lockers and an analysis board, a massage and medical room, showers and toilets, a recovery bath, and air conditioning with central heating. Additional spaces include a delegate room, a referees’ locker room equipped with lockers, showers, and toilets, a medical room, a sound system, a press center, and toilets for spectators.
