= Kim Sindermann =

German footballer (born 2001)

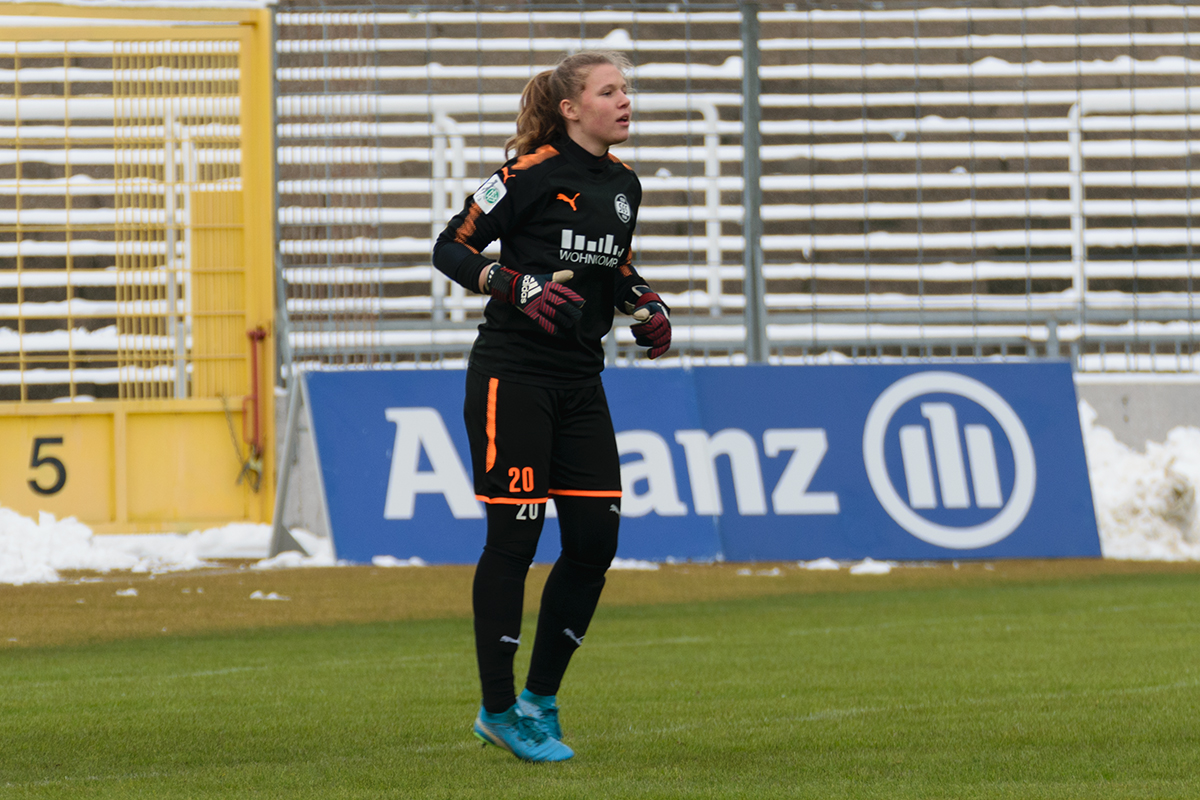

Personal information
- Full name: Kim Lea Sindermann
- Date of birth: 1 January 2001 (age 25)
- Place of birth: Bochum, Germany
- Height: 1.70 m (5 ft 7 in)
- Position: Goalkeeper

Team information
- Current team: SGS Essen
- Number: 1

Senior career*
Years	Team	Apps	(Gls)
2017–	SGS Essen II	17	(0)
2017–	SGS Essen	67	(0)
- * Club domestic league appearances and goals as of 22 November 2026

Kim Lea Sindermann (born 1 January 2001) is a German professional footballer who plays as a goalkeeper for Frauen-Bundesliga club SGS Essen.
