= Carlotta Wamser =

German footballer

- Wamser with Germany in 2026

Personal information
- Date of birth: 1 November 2003 (age 23)
- Place of birth: Herford, Germany
- Height: 1.67 m (5 ft 6 in)
- Position: Right-back

Team information
- Current team: Manchester City
- Number: 37

Youth career
- TuS Grastrup-Retzen
- TBV Lemgo
- 2017–2020: SpVg Brakel

Senior career*
Years	Team	Apps	(Gls)
2020–2022	SGS Essen	42	(6)
2022	Eintracht Frankfurt II	2	(2)
2022–2025	Eintracht Frankfurt	48	(7)
2024	→ FC Köln (loan)	11	(1)
2025–2026	Bayer Leverkusen	20	(2)
2026–	Manchester City	11	(0)

International career^{‡}
2017–2018	Germany U15	5	(1)
2018	Germany U16	2	(1)
2019–2020	Germany U17	13	(11)
2021–2022	Germany U19	6	(4)
2021–2022	Germany U20	5	(0)
2025–	Germany	16	(2)
- * Club domestic league appearances and goals as of 22:25, 22 November 2026 (UTC) ‡ National team caps and goals as of 21:15, 13 October 2026 (UTC)

Carlotta Wamser (born 1 November 2003) is a German footballer who plays as a right-back for Women’s Super League club Manchester City and the Germany national team.

== Club career ==
Born in Herford, Carlotta Wamser grew up in Bad Salzuflen and started her career at local club TuS Grastrup – Retzen. In 2017 she switched to SpVg Brakel via TBV Lemgo. In Brakel, she first played in the male C youth and rose in the second-class Westphalian League. In addition, she and her team won the Westphalian Futsal Championship in 2019. In the 2019–20 season, Wamser played in the B junior state league and was awarded the Fritz Walter medal in bronze in 2020.

In the summer of 2020, Wamser moved to Bundesliga club SGS Essen and signed a contract until 2023. She made her Bundesliga debut on 4 September 2020, in the 3–0 defeat against VfL Wolfsburg. Wamser played in all games in the 2020–21 season and was her team's top scorer with five goals. The SGS fans voted Wamser player of the season. Wamser made 42 league appearances for Essen, scoring six goals.

For the 2022–23 season, Wamser moved to Eintracht Frankfurt and received a contract until 30 June 2025.

At the beginning of January 2024, Wamser went on loan to league rivals 1. FC Köln until the end of the season. She netted the winner in the home game against Werder Bremen, bringing the score to 2–1 in the 81st minute.

On 31 August 2026, Wamser joined Women's Super League champions Manchester City on a four-year contract.

== International career ==
With the Germany U17 national team, Wamser won the 2019 European Championship by beating the Netherlands 3–2 in the final. Wamser was also voted into the tournament's all-star team.

On 12 June 2025, Wamser was called up to the Germany squad for the UEFA Women's Euro 2025.

== Career statistics ==
As of 13 October 2026

Appearances and goals by national team and year
National team	Year	Apps	Goals
Germany	2025	8	0
Germany	2026	8	2
Total		16	2

Scores and results list Germany's goal tally first, score column indicates score after each Wamser goal.

List of international goals scored by Carlotta Wamser
No.	Date	Venue	Opponent	Score	Result	Competition
1	7 March 2026	Lyse Arena, Stavanger, Norway	Norway	4–0	4–0	2027 FIFA World Cup qualification
2	5 June 2026	RheinEnergieStadion, Cologne, Germany	Norway	2–0	2–0	2027 FIFA World Cup qualification

== Honours ==
Germany U17

- U17 European Champion : 2019

Individual

- Fritz Walter Medal: Bronze 2020, Silver (U19) 2022
