= Sophie Weidauer =

German footballer (born 2002)

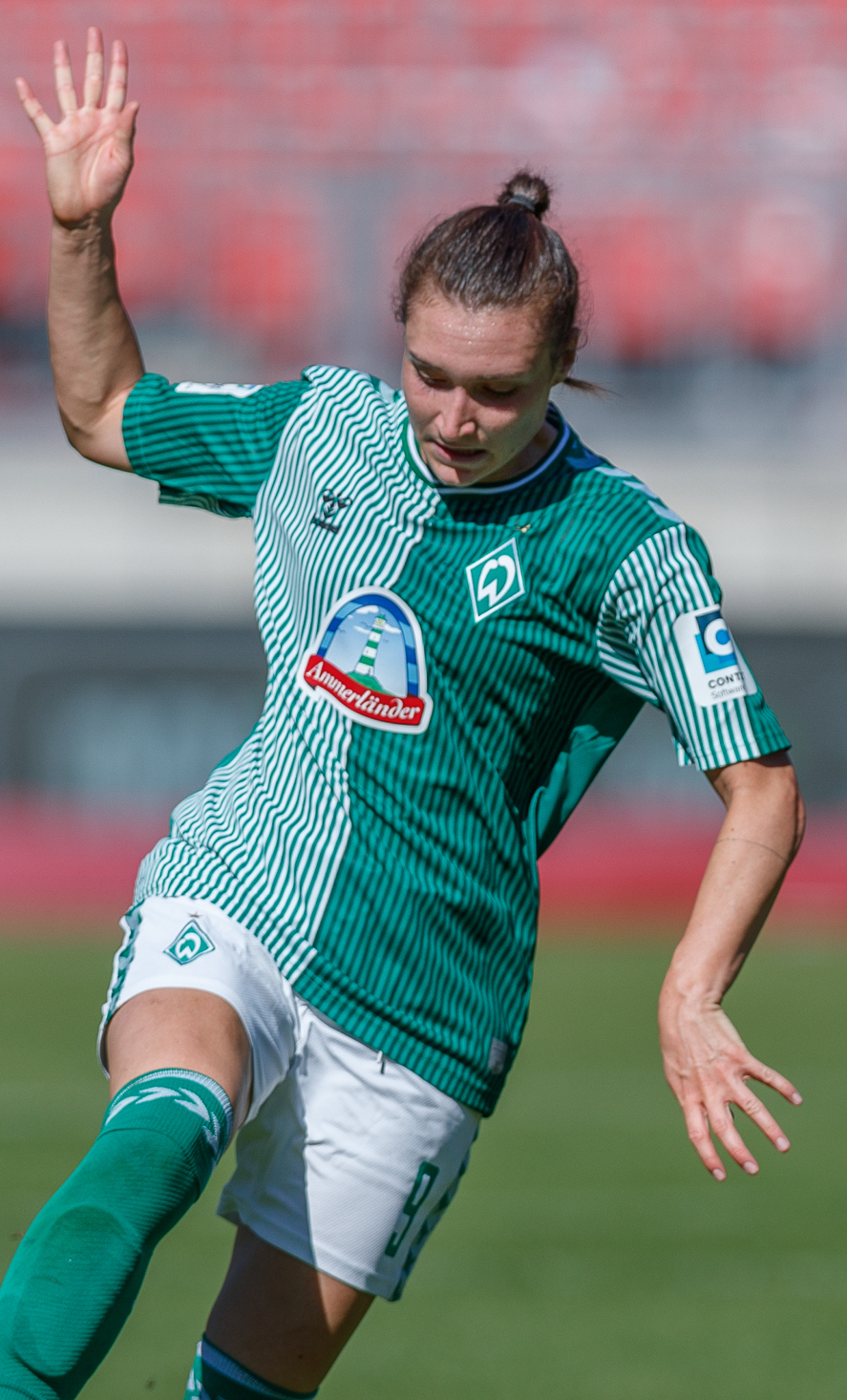
- Weidauer with Werder Bremen in 2023

Personal information
- Date of birth: 10 February 2002 (age 24)
- Place of birth: Stollberg, Germany
- Height: 1.68 m (5 ft 6 in)
- Position: Forward

Team information
- Current team: Union Berlin
- Number: 9

Senior career*
Years	Team	Apps	(Gls)
2018–19	Turbine Potsdam II	18	(12)
2019–2023	Turbine Potsdam	81	(12)
2023–2025	Werder Bremen	44	(12)
2025–	Union Berlin	32	(6)

International career^{‡}
2018–19	Germany women's U17	15	(10)
2020	Germany women's U19	6	(8)
2022	Germany women's U20	3	(1)
2025–	Germany women's U23	17	(9)
- * Club domestic league appearances and goals as of 14 November 2026 ‡ National team caps and goals as of 18:05, 9 June 2026 (UTC)

Sophie Weidauer (born 10 February 2002) is a German footballer who plays as a forward for Frauen-Bundesliga club Union Berlin.

== Early life ==
Weidauer was born 10 February 2002 in Stollberg, Germany. At age 12, she moved to Potsdam and attended a sports boarding school so she could play with the youth club at Turbine Potsdam.

== Club career ==
Weidauer started her career playing for Turbine Potsdam II for the 2018–19 season, while she was also playing for Germany's women's U17 national team. The following season, she was called up to play for Turbine Potsdam, where she remained until the end of the 2023 season. During her time with Turbine Potsdam, Weidauer played in 81 games and scored 12 goals. In 2021, the team won the KAIF Trophy. She also made five appearances in the DFB-Pokal Frauen cup, scoring five goals. The team was runner-up for the 2021–22 season.

For the 2023–24 season, Weidauer transferred to Werder Bremen.

== International career ==
Weidauer has represented Germany at youth level, including on Germany's women's national under-17 (2018–19), under-19 (2020), and under-20 football teams (2022). During this time, she played in the 2018 UEFA Women's Under-17 Championship, where the team came in second behind Spain, as well as in the 2019 UEFA Women's Under-17 Championship, where Germany came in first.
