= Lisanne Gräwe =

German footballer (born 2003)

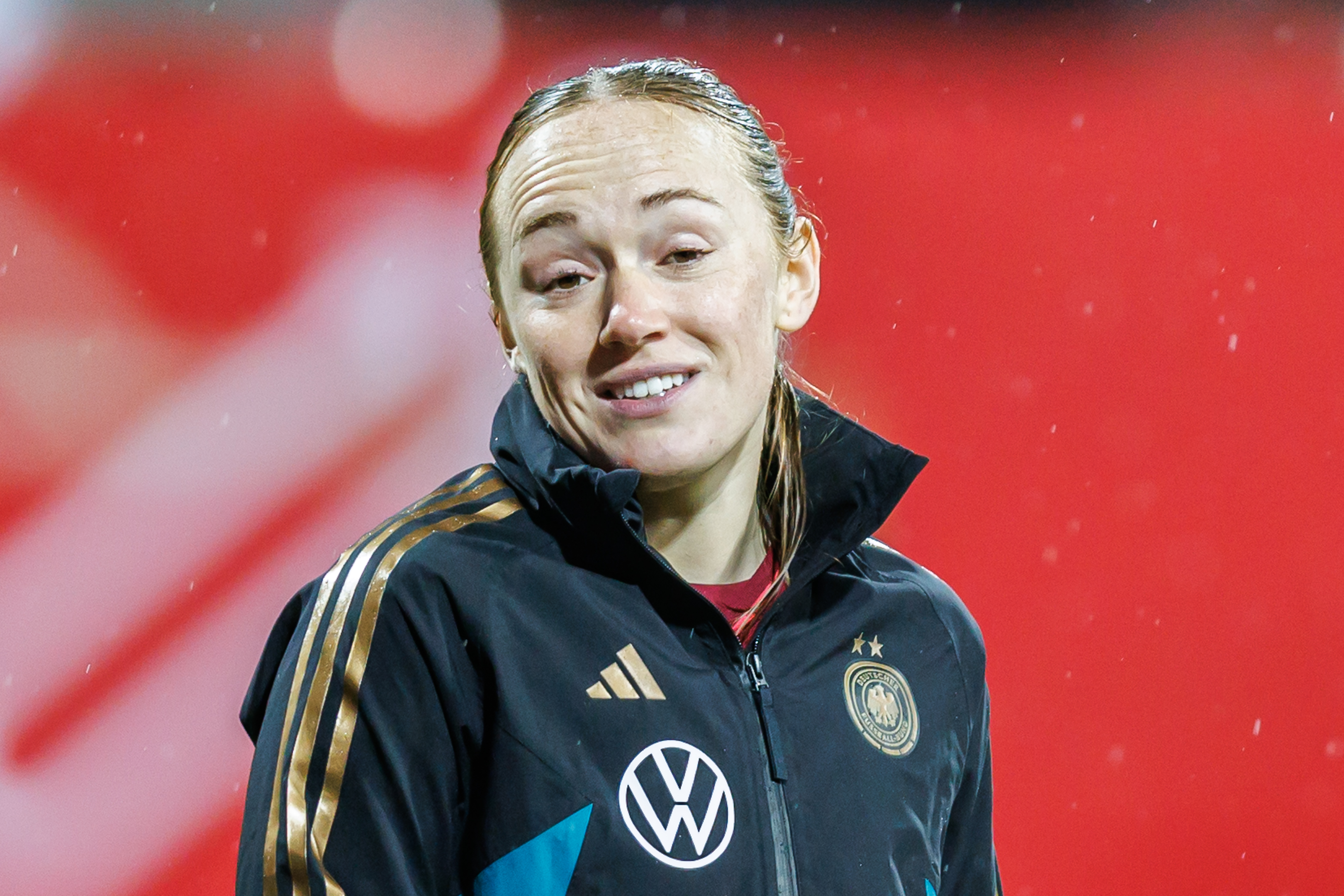
- Gräwe with Germany in 2025

Personal information
- Date of birth: 11 February 2003 (age 23)
- Place of birth: Rheda-Wiedenbrück, Germany
- Height: 1.61 m (5 ft 3 in)
- Position: Midfielder

Team information
- Current team: Union Berlin
- Number: 6

Senior career*
Years	Team	Apps	(Gls)
2019–2021	VfL Wolfsburg II	23	(1)
2020–2021	VfL Wolfsburg	1	(0)
2021–2023	Bayer Leverkusen	33	(1)
2023–2026	Eintracht Frankfurt	67	(4)
2026–	Union Berlin	8	(0)

International career^{‡}
2016–2018	Germany U15	9	(1)
2018	Germany U16	2	(0)
2019–2020	Germany U17	13	(1)
2021–2022	Germany U19	6	(1)
2021–2022	Germany U20	7	(1)
2025–	Germany U23	4	(1)
2024–	Germany	6	(0)
- * Club domestic league appearances and goals as of 20 November 2026 ‡ National team caps and goals as of 22:45, 9 June 2026 (UTC)

Lisanne Gräwe (born 11 February 2003) is a German footballer who plays as a midfielder for Frauen-Bundesliga club Union Berlin. She has previously played for VfL Wolfsburg, Bayer 04 Leverkusen, and Eintracht Frankfurt.

== Career statistics ==
As of 9 June 2026

Appearances and goals by national team and year
Germany
Year	Apps	Goals
2024	3	0
2026	3	0
Total	6	0
