= Germany women's national football team =

Women's association football team

Germany
- Nickname(s): DFB-Frauenteam (DFB Women's Team); DFB-Frauen (DFB Women)
- Association: Deutscher Fußball-Bund (DFB)
- Confederation: UEFA
- Head coach: Christian Wück
- Captain: Giulia Gwinn
- Most caps: Birgit Prinz (214)
- Top scorer: Birgit Prinz (128)
- Home stadium: Various
- FIFA code: GER
First colours	Second colours	Anniversary colours

FIFA ranking
- Current: 3 (20 October 2026)
- Highest: 1 (October 2003 – December 2006, October – December 2007, December 2014 – March 2015, March 2017)
- Lowest: 6 (August – December 2023)

First international
- West Germany 5–1 Switzerland (Koblenz, West Germany; 10 November 1982)

Biggest win
- Germany 17–0 Kazakhstan (Wiesbaden, Germany; 19 November 2011)

Biggest defeat
- United States 6–0 Germany (Decatur, United States; 14 March 1996)

World Cup
- Appearances: 9 (first in 1991)
- Best result: Champions (2003, 2007)

European Championship
- Appearances: 13 (first in 1989)
- Best result: Champions (1989, 1991, 1995, 1997, 2001, 2005, 2009, 2013)

Olympic Games
- Appearances: 6 (first in 1996)
- Best result: (gold) Gold medal (2016)

Nations League Finals
- Appearances: 2 (first in 2024)
- Best result: Runners-up (2025)
Medal record
FIFA Women's World Cup
Gold medal – first place	2003 United States	Team
Gold medal – first place	2007 China	Team
Silver medal – second place	1995 Sweden	Team
UEFA Women's Championship
Gold medal – first place	1989 West Germany	Team
Gold medal – first place	1991 Denmark	Team
Gold medal – first place	1995 Germany	Team
Gold medal – first place	1997 Norway–Sweden	Team
Gold medal – first place	2001 Germany	Team
Gold medal – first place	2005 England	Team
Gold medal – first place	2009 Finland	Team
Gold medal – first place	2013 Sweden	Team
Silver medal – second place	2022 England	Team
Olympic Games
Gold medal – first place	2016 Rio de Janeiro	Team
Bronze medal – third place	2000 Sydney	Team
Bronze medal – third place	2004 Athens	Team
Bronze medal – third place	2008 Beijing	Team
Bronze medal – third place	2024 Paris	Team
UEFA Women's Nations League Finals
Silver medal – second place	2025 France, Germany, Spain & Sweden	Team
Bronze medal – third place	2024 France, Netherlands & Spain	Team
- Website: DFB.de (in German)

The Germany women's national football team (German: Deutsche Fußballnationalmannschaft der Frauen) represents Germany in international women's football. The team is governed by the German Football Association (DFB).

The Germany national team is one of the most successful in women's football. They are two-time world champions, having won the 2003 and 2007 tournaments. The team has won eight of the fourteen UEFA European Championships, claiming six consecutive titles between 1995 and 2013. They, along with the Netherlands, are one of the two nations that have won both the women's and men's European tournament. Also, they and Spain are the only two teams that have won both the women's and men's World Cup tournament. Germany has won Olympic gold in 2016, after three consecutive bronze medals at the Women's Olympic Football Tournament, finishing third in 2000, 2004, 2008 and won another bronze medal in 2024. Birgit Prinz holds the record for most appearances and is the team's all-time leading goalscorer. Prinz has also set international records; she has received the FIFA World Player of the Year award three times and is the joint second overall top goalscorer at the Women's World Cup.

Women's football was long met with scepticism in Germany, and official matches were banned by the DFB until 1970. However, the women's national team has grown in popularity since winning the World Cup in 2003, as it was chosen as Germany's Sports Team of the Year. As of August 2025, Germany is ranked fifth in the FIFA Women's World Rankings.

== History ==
=== Early history ===
In 1955, the DFB decided to forbid women's football in all its clubs in West Germany. In its explanation, the DFB cited that "this combative sport is fundamentally foreign to the nature of women" and that "body and soul would inevitably suffer damage". Further, the "display of the body violates etiquette and decency". In spite of this ban, more than 150 unofficial international matches were played in the 1950s and 1960s. On 30 October 1970, the ban on women's football was lifted at the DFB annual convention.

Other football associations had already formed official women's national teams in the 1970s, the DFB long remained uninvolved in women's football. In 1981, DFB official Horst R. Schmidt was invited to send a team to the unofficial women's football world championship. Schmidt accepted the invitation but hid the fact that West Germany had no women's national team at the time. To avoid humiliation, the DFB sent the German club champions Bergisch Gladbach 09, who went on to win the tournament and repeat the same feat three years later in 1984. Seeing a need, the DFB established the women's national team in 1982. DFB president Hermann Neuberger appointed Gero Bisanz, an instructor at the Cologne Sports College, to set up the team.

=== 1982–1994: Difficult beginnings and first European titles ===
In September 1982, Bisanz organised two scouting training courses from which he selected a squad of 16 players. The team's first international match took place on 10 November 1982 in Koblenz. Following the tradition of the men's team, Switzerland was chosen as West Germany's first opponent. Doris Kresimon scored the first international goal in the 25th minute. In the second half, 18-year-old Silvia Neid contributed two goals to the 5–1 victory; Neid later became the assistant coach in 1996 and the head coach in 2005.

With five draws and one defeat, West Germany failed to qualify for the inaugural 1984 European Championship, finishing third in the qualifying group. In the beginning, Bisanz's primary objective was to close the gap to the Scandinavian countries and Italy – then the strongest teams in Europe. He emphasized training in basic skills and the need for an effective youth programme. Starting in 1985, Bisanz increasingly called-up younger players, but at first had little success with this concept, as West Germany again failed to qualify for the 1987 European Championship finals.

Undefeated and without conceding a goal, the German team qualified for the European Championship for the first time in 1989; the tournament was played on home soil in West Germany. The semi-final against Italy was the first international women's football match shown live on German television. The game was decided by a penalty shootout, in which goalkeeper Marion Isbert saved three penalty kicks and scored the winning penalty herself. On 2 July 1989 in Osnabrück, West Germany played Norway in the final. Before a crowd of 22,000, they beat favourites Norway and won 4–1 with goals from Ursula Lohn, Heidi Mohr and Angelika Fehrmann. This victory marked the team's first international title.

After the German reunification, the East German football association joined the DFB. The East German women's national football team had played only one official international match, losing 3–0 to Czechoslovakia in a friendly match on 9 May 1990. The unified German team defended their title successfully at the 1991 European Championship. After winning all games in the qualifying group, Germany again met Italy in the semi-final, this time winning 3–0. On 14 July 1991, the German team once more faced Norway in the final. The game went to extra time, during which Heidi Mohr and Silvia Neid scored for Germany and secured the 3–1 victory.

In November 1991, Germany participated in the first Women's World Cup in China. Following victories over Nigeria, Taiwan and Italy, the German team reached the quarter-final without conceding a single goal. Silvia Neid scored the first German World Cup goal on 17 November 1991 against Nigeria. Germany won the quarter-final against Denmark 2–1 after extra time, but lost 2–5 in the semi-final to the United States, who went on to win the tournament. Following a 0–4 defeat in the third-place match against Sweden, Germany finished fourth in the tournament.

The German team failed to defend their title at the 1993 European Championship, suffering a semi-final defeat to Italy in a penalty shootout, and later losing 1–3 against Denmark in the third-place playoff. Despite the disappointing result, new talents such as Steffi Jones, Maren Meinert and Silke Rottenberg made their tournament debut and later became key players for the German team.

=== 1995–2002: Olympic and World Cup disappointments ===
Birgit Prinz scored in a major tournament for the first time in 1995. Germany won its third European Championship during the same year. After winning all qualification matches, scoring 55 goals, the German team defeated England 6–2 over two legs in the semi-final. Germany met Sweden in the final, which was played at the Fritz Walter Stadion in Kaiserslautern, Germany, on 26 March 1995. The Swedish team managed to score early, but Germany came back to win 3–2 with goals from Maren Meinert, Prinz and Bettina Wiegmann.

At the 1995 Women's World Cup in Sweden, the German team lost against the Scandinavian hosts, but still succeeded in winning their group by beating Japan and Brazil. Germany won the quarter-final against England 3–0, and defeated China 1–0 with a late goal by Bettina Wiegmann in the semi-final. On 18 June 1995 in Stockholm, the German team appeared in their first Women's World Cup final. Facing Norway, they lost the match 0–2, but as runners-up achieved their best World Cup result until then.

Women's football was first played as an Olympic sport at the 1996 Summer Olympics. Bettina Wiegmann scored the first Olympic goal in the opening match against Japan, which Germany won 3–2. After losing their second group game against Norway 2–3, and drawing with Brazil 1–1, Germany was eliminated, finishing third in the group with four points from three matches. Head coach Gero Bisanz resigned after the tournament and his assistant since 1983, Tina Theune, took over as the new national coach. Silvia Neid ended her playing career and was appointed the new assistant coach.

The 1997 European Championship was the first test for new coach Theune. Following a defeat against Norway, Germany finished second in the qualifying group and only secured qualification by beating Iceland in a relegation play-off. After drawing with Italy and Norway, a victory over Denmark in the last group game saw the German team go through to the knockout stage. They beat Sweden 1–0 in the semi-final, and on 12 July 1997, claimed their fourth European championship with a 2–0 win over Italy, with goals from Sandra Minnert and Birgit Prinz.

At the 1999 Women's World Cup in the United States, the German team also failed to qualify directly, but managed to beat Ukraine in a qualifying play-off. Germany started their World Cup campaign by drawing with Italy and winning 6–0 over Mexico. In the last group game, Germany drew 3–3 against Brazil; by conceding a last minute equalizer, Germany failed to win the group and subsequently had to face the hosts in the quarter-final. With 54,642 people in attendance, among them U.S. President Bill Clinton, the crowd at the Jack Kent Cooke Stadium was the biggest the German team had ever played in front of. Despite leading twice, they lost 2–3 to the eventual World Cup winners.

Germany competed at the 2000 Summer Olympics, winning all three group games against Australia, Brazil and Sweden. The German team dominated the semi-final against Norway, but lost the game 0–1 after an own goal by Tina Wunderlich in the 80th minute. They beat Brazil 2–0 in the third place match with goals from Birgit Prinz and Renate Lingor, and won the bronze medal. It was the first Olympic medal for the German Football Associations since 1988 when the men's team also won bronze.

In 2001, Germany hosted the European Championship. Following victories over Sweden, Russia and England in the group stage, the German team beat Norway 1–0 in the semi-final courtesy of a diving header by Sandra Smisek. On 7 July 2001 in Ulm, they met Sweden in the final, which was played in heavy rain. The game was scoreless after 90 minutes and went to extra time, where Claudia Müller scored a golden goal and secured the fifth European title for Germany.

=== 2003–2023: Two consecutive World Cup titles ===
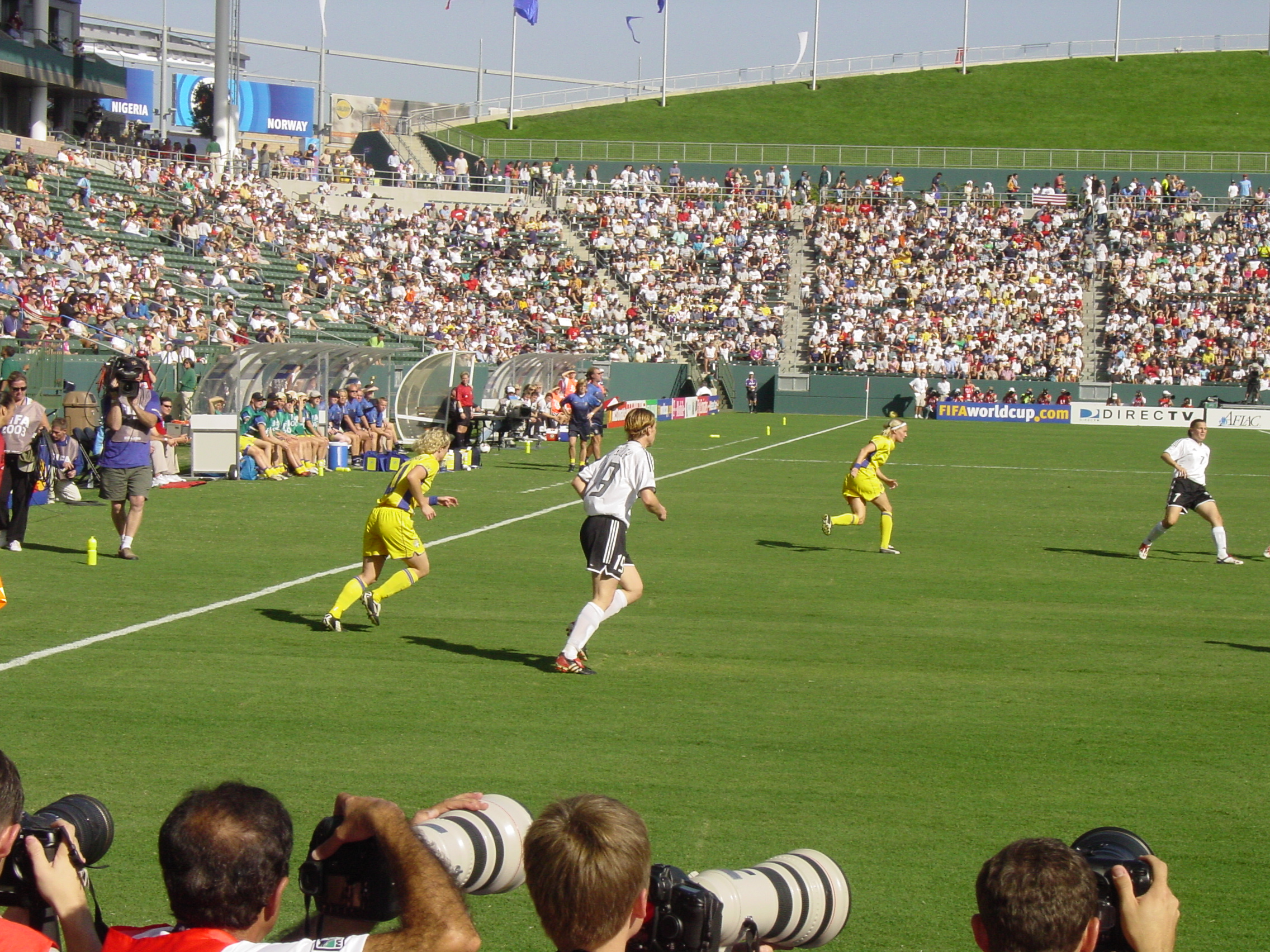
Germany playing Sweden in the 2003 Women's World Cup final

At the 2003 Women's World Cup in the United States, Germany was drawn in a group with Canada, Japan and Argentina. After winning all three group games, the German team defeated Russia 7–1 in the quarter-final, which set up another clash with the United States. Germany's Kerstin Garefrekes scored after 15 minutes and goalkeeper Silke Rottenberg made several key saves. In the dying minutes of the semi-final, Maren Meinert and Birgit Prinz sealed the 3–0 win. On 12 October 2003, Germany met Sweden in the World Cup final in Los Angeles. The Scandinavians went ahead before half time, but Maren Meinert equalized shortly after the break. The game went to extra time, where Nia Künzer headed the winning golden goal in the 98th minute to claim Germany's first Women's World Cup title. Birgit Prinz was honoured as the tournament's best player and top goalscorer.

With wins over China and Mexico, the German team finished first in their group at the 2004 Summer Olympics. They beat Nigeria 2–1 in the quarter-final, but suffered a 1–2 semi-final loss to the United States after extra time. In the third place match, Germany defeated Sweden 1–0 with a goal by Renate Lingor, winning the team's second Olympic bronze medal.

The 2005 European Championship was held in England. With wins over Norway, Italy and France in Round 1, the German team advanced to the semi-final, where they defeated Finland 4–1. On 19 June 2005, they met Norway for the third time in the European championship final. Germany won 3–1 with goals from Inka Grings, Renate Lingor and Birgit Prinz and added a sixth European title. Head coach Tina Theune stepped down after the tournament and her assistant Silvia Neid took over as national coach. In 2006, Germany won the annual Algarve Cup for the first time.

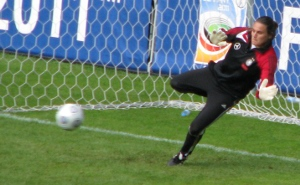
Nadine Angerer saved a penalty in the 2007 Women's World Cup final.

As reigning world champion, Germany played the opening game at the 2007 Women's World Cup in China, outclassing Argentina 11–0. After a goalless draw against England and a 2–0 win over Japan, the German team defeated North Korea 3–0 in the quarter-final. They beat Norway by the same result in the semi-final, with goals from Kerstin Stegemann, Martina Müller and a Norwegian own goal. On 30 September 2007, Germany faced Brazil in the World Cup final in Shanghai. Birgit Prinz put Germany in front after half time and goalkeeper Nadine Angerer saved a penalty by Brazilian Marta. Simone Laudehr scored a second goal after 86 minutes, which sealed the German 2–0 victory. Germany was the first team (men's and women's game) to win the World Cup without conceding a goal and the first to successfully defend the Women's World Cup title. With 14 goals, Prinz became the tournament's overall top goalscorer.

In a replay of the 2007 World Cup final, the German team drew 0–0 with Brazil in the opening game at the 2008 Summer Olympics. They then beat both Nigeria and North Korea to advance to the quarter-final, where they defeated Sweden 2–0 after extra time. In the semi-final, Germany again met Brazil. Birgit Prinz scored in the 10th minute, but the German team lost 1–4 after conceding three goals to Brazilian counter-attacks in the second half. They beat Japan 2–0 for the bronze medal, with Fatmire Bajramaj scoring both goals. The third consecutive semi-final loss at the Olympics was seen as a disappointment by both the players and the German press.

Germany qualified for the 2009 European Championship in Finland winning all eight games and scoring 34 goals. They beat Norway, France and Iceland in the group stage to advance to the quarter-final, where they won 2–1 against Italy. After trailing Norway at half-time in the semi-final, the German team fought back to a 3–1 victory. On 10 September 2009, they defeated England 6–2 for their seventh European trophy. Birgit Prinz and Inka Grings scored twice, with Melanie Behringer and Kim Kulig also scoring. Grings retained her award as the tournament's top scorer from 2005, while Germany extended their winning streak at the European Championship finals to a 19-match run dating back to 1997.

Germany hosted the 2011 FIFA Women's World Cup and won the three games on the group stage, over Canada, France and Nigeria. On the quarterfinals, the team suffered an upset by Japan, who won on overtime with a goal by Karina Maruyama. The defeat broke the Germans' streak of sixteen undefeated games at the World Cup.

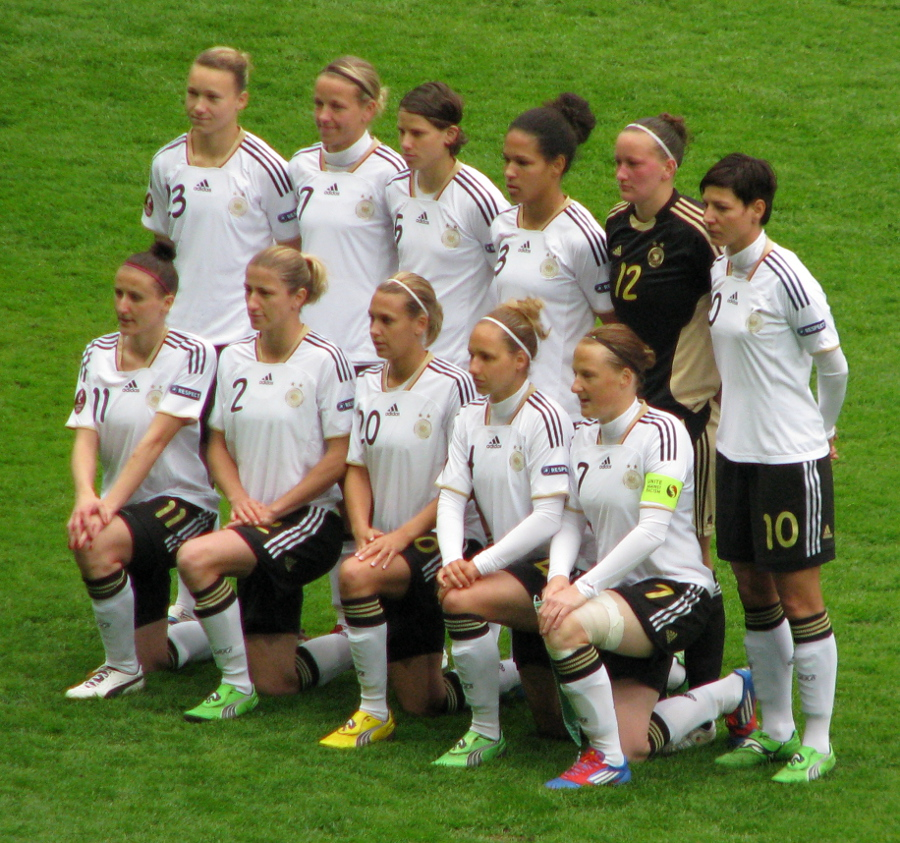
Germany women's national team in 2012

By failing to finish among the top two UEFA teams, Germany was unable to qualify for the 2012 Summer Olympics.

At the 2013 European Championship in Sweden, the Germans won their sixth straight continental title, with the decisive game being a 1–0 victory over Norway. Goalkeeper Nadine Angerer, who stopped two penalties during the final, was chosen as the tournament's best player.

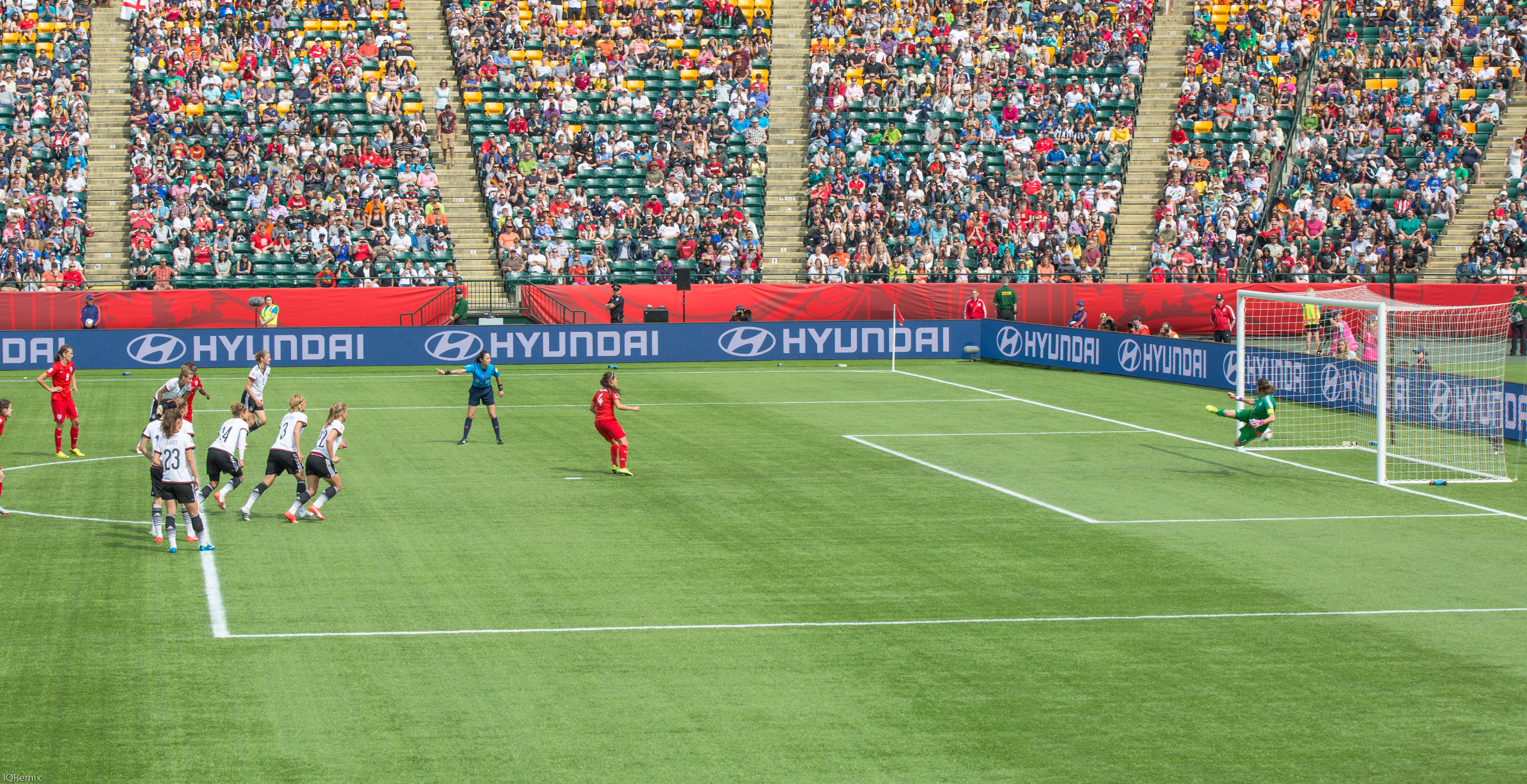
Fara Williams calmly slots a penalty beyond Nadine Angerer at the 2015 FIFA Women's World Cup, to inflict Germany's first ever defeat by England

The 2015 FIFA Women's World Cup had Germany again reaching the top four. In the semi-final against the United States, Célia Šašić, who wound up as the tournament's top scorer, missed a penalty, and afterwards goals by Carli Lloyd and Kelley O'Hara lead to an American victory. The third place match saw the Germans lose their first ever match to England after 21 contests, due to a penalty kick by Fara Williams during extra time.

At the 2019 Women's World Cup Germany were in Group B with China PR, South Africa, and Spain. They topped the group with three wins and defeated Nigeria in the Round of 16. Germany was eliminated by Sweden in the quarter-finals, losing to them for the first time in 24 years and conceding their only goals of the tournament and so failed to qualify for the Olympic football tournament of Tokyo 2020.

At the 2022 European Championship, Germany reached the final, where the team lost 1–2 after extra time against the host of the tournament, England. For Germany, the record winners of the competition, this was their ninth appearance in a Euro final and the first in which they were defeated.

Germany entered the 2023 FIFA Women's World Cup as one of the title favourites, being second in the FIFA Rankings at the time. Drawn into Group H alongside Morocco, Colombia, and South Korea, they seemed to have a strong start after defeating Morocco 6–0. However, they would lose to Colombia 2–1. After tying with South Korea 1–1 alongside Morocco's 1–0 victory against Colombia, they were eliminated and missed the knockout stage for the first time in their history. This was widely described as one of the biggest upsets in the history of the Women's World Cup.

== Team image ==
=== Nicknames ===
The Germany women's national football team has been known or nicknamed as "Die Nationalelf (The National Eleven)".

=== Kits and crest ===
Emblem for the Olympic Games

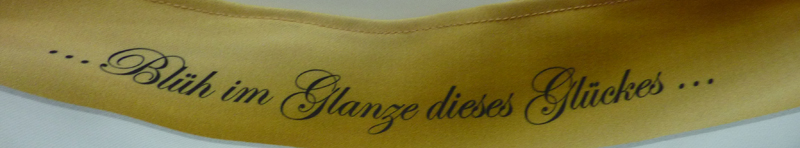
Verse of the national anthem on the collar.

The German women's national football team wears white shirts with black shorts and white socks, following the tradition of the German men's team – black and white are the colours of Prussia. The current change kit is all dark green. In the past, Germany also used green shirts with white shorts and green socks as the away kit, as well as a red and black kit, with black shorts and red socks.

The women's national team originally played with the emblem of the German men's team, a variation of the DFB logo with the Federal Eagle of Germany (Bundesadler) and three stars at the top for the men's 1954, 1974 and 1990 World Cup titles. Since their first Women's World Cup win in 2003, the team displays its own World Cup titles; initially with one star, and since 2007, with two stars at the top of the emblem. While being reigning world champions, Germany also displayed the newly created "FIFA Women's World Champions Badge" on their shirts from 2009 until 2011 when they were succeeded by Japan.

In accordance with the rules of the International Olympic Committee, Germany does not wear its official uniform with the logo of the German Football Association while competing at the Summer Olympics. Instead, the DFB badge is replaced by the coat of arms of Germany. Like all DFB squads, the women's national team is supplied by Adidas. The team's main sponsor is the German insurance company Allianz.

=== Home stadium ===
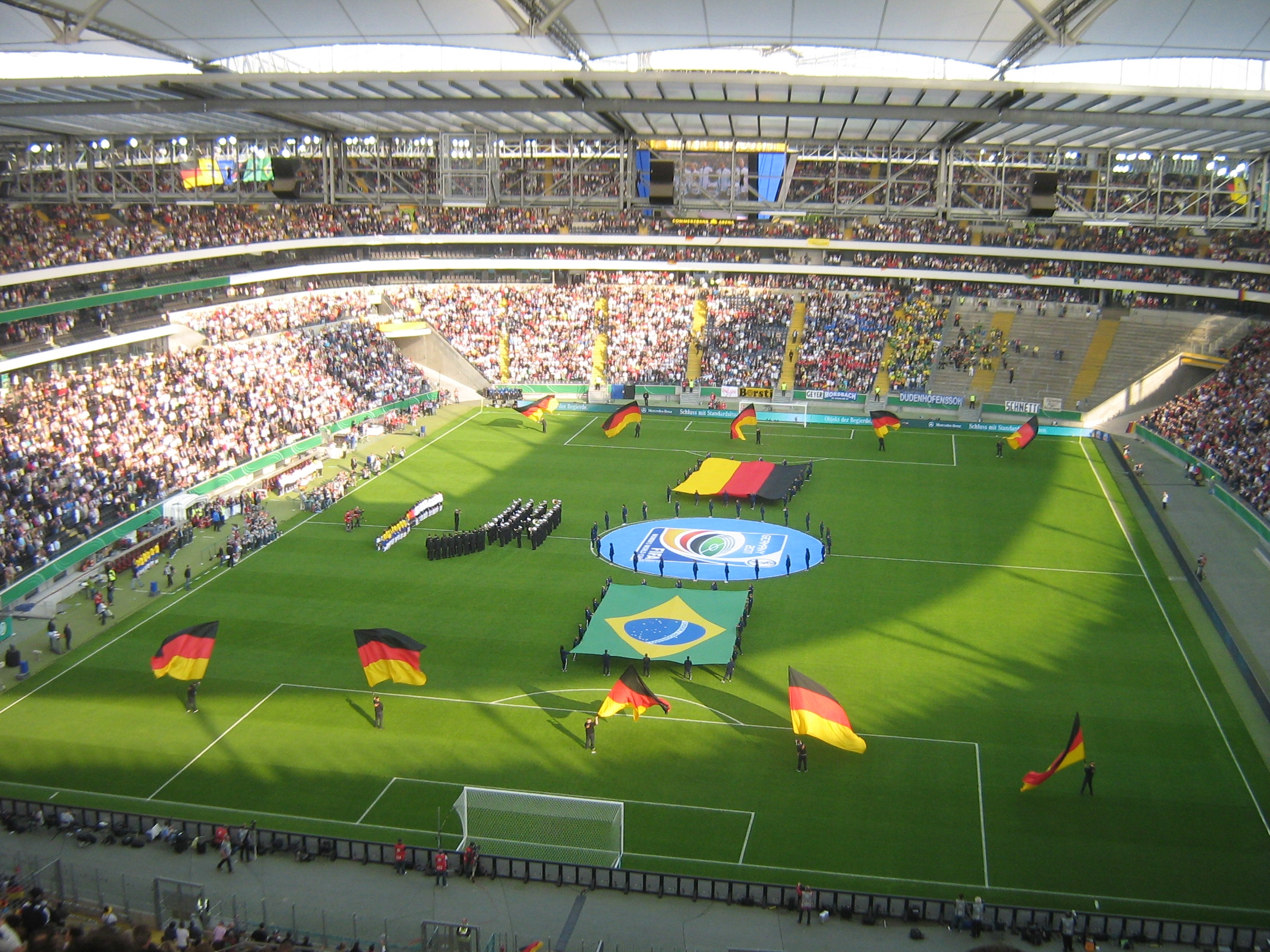
Germany playing Brazil before a crowd of 44,825 in Frankfurt.

The Germany national football team has no national stadium. Like the men, the women's team play their home matches in different stadiums throughout the country. As of June 2011, they have played in 87 different German cities. Most home games have been held in Osnabrück with six matches, followed by Ulm (five games), and Bochum, Kaiserslautern, Koblenz, Lüdenscheid, Rheine, Siegen and Weil am Rhein (three games each). The first home match in former East Germany was played in Aue in May 1991.

In the 1980s and 1990s, home matches were mostly played in smaller towns with no professional football clubs. As the team became more successful, especially after the World Cup win in 2003, the number of spectators rose accordingly.

The record attendance for Germany was 73,680 in the 2011 Women's World Cup opening game against Canada at the Olympic Stadium in Berlin. That game also set a new European record in women's football. Away from home, the team's crowd record was 54,642 in the 1999 Women's World Cup quarter-final against the United States at the Jack Kent Cooke Stadium in Landover.

=== Acceptance and popularity ===
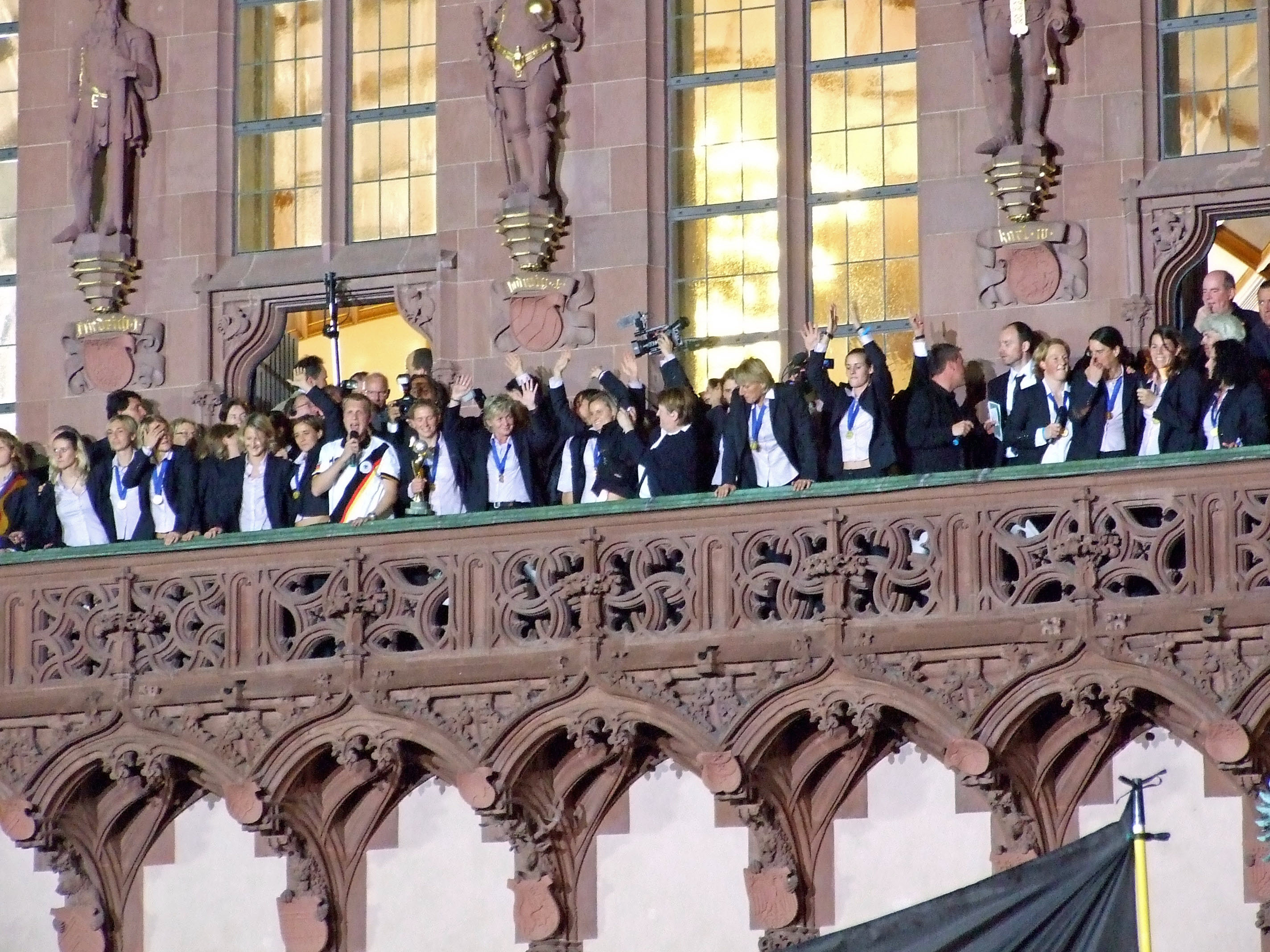
Arrival in Frankfurt after winning the 2007 Women's World Cup

For most of the 20th century, women's football was a niche sport in Germany and was frowned upon. The 2003 World Cup title marked the breakthrough for the women's national football team in Germany. The final was watched by 10.48 million viewers on German television (a 33.2 percent market share) and the German team was welcomed home by almost 10,000 fans at Frankfurt's city hall. Later that year, they were honoured as the 2003 German Sports Team of the Year. Nia Künzer's World Cup winning golden goal was voted Germany's 2003 Goal of the Year, the first time the award was won by a female player. Each member of the World Cup squad received a prearranged bonus of 15,000 euros for winning the tournament; four years later the players received 50,000 euros for their successful title defense. Since 2005, almost all of the women's national football team's matches have been shown live on German television. In 2009, one million of the 6.7 million DFB members were female.

The final of the 2007 Women's World Cup was seen by 9.05 million television viewers (a 50.5 percent market share). After the team returned to Germany, they were celebrated by a crowd of 20,000 in Frankfurt. In December 2007, all players of the World Cup squad received the Silberne Lorbeerblatt (Silver Laurel Leaf), the highest state decoration for athletes in Germany. National coach Silvia Neid was awarded the Federal Cross of Merit on ribbon by German president Horst Köhler.

Women's football is one of the fastest growing sports in Germany. Attendance for the women's Bundesliga more than tripled in one year, with an average of 806 in 2022 to an average of 2,723 in 2023.

In 2022 the most watched sporting event on German TV with nearly 18 million people watching was the women's national team final of the Euros against England. The following year the women kept more views than the men's team with 10.37 million television viewers.

== Results and fixtures ==
The following is a list of match results in the last 12 months, as well as any future matches that have been scheduled.

Legend

Win Draw Loss Fixture

=== 2025 ===
28 November 2025 Nations League F	Germany	0–0	Spain	Kaiserslautern
20:30		Report		Stadium: Fritz-Walter-Stadion; Attendance: 40,159; Referee: Iuliana Demetrescu (Romania)

2 December 2025 Nations League F	Spain	3–0 (3–0 agg.)	Germany	Madrid
18:30	Pina 61', 74'; López 68'	Report		Stadium: Metropolitano Stadium; Attendance: 55,843; Referee: Silvia Gasperotti (Italy)

=== 2026 ===
3 March FIFA WC Q	Germany	5–0	Slovenia	Dresden
17:45	Endemann 6'; Senß 12'; Dallmann 48'; Mühlhaus 53'; Schüller 71'	Report		Stadium: Rudolf-Harbig-Stadion; Attendance: 19,169; Referee: Eleni Antoniou (Greece)

7 March FIFA WC Q	Norway	0–4	Germany	Stavanger
18:00		Report	Senß 18'; Wamser 45+1'; Endemann 45+4'; Brand 58'	Stadium: Lyse Arena; Attendance: 8,532; Referee: Stéphanie Frappart (France)

14 April FIFA WC Q	Germany	5–1	Austria	Nuremberg
18:15	Anyomi 17'; Endemann 52'; Puntigam 68' (o.g.); Brand 76'; Schüller 83'	Report	D'Angelo 77'	Stadium: Max-Morlock-Stadion; Attendance: 24,237; Referee: Volha Blotskaya (Belarus)

18 April FIFA WC Q	Austria	0–0	Germany	Ried
18:00		Report		Stadium: BWT X Upper Austrian Arena; Attendance: 4,300; Referee: Iuliana Demetrescu (Romania)

5 June FIFA WC Q	Germany	2–0	Norway	Cologne
20:35	Müller 18'; Wamser 27'	Report		Stadium: RheinEnergieStadion; Attendance: 33,425; Referee: Marta Huerta De Aza (Spain)

9 June FIFA WC Q	Slovenia	0–2	Germany	Ljubljana
18:00		Report	Prašnikar 39' (o.g.); Martinez 50'	Stadium: Stožice Stadium; Attendance: 3,000; Referee: Michalina Diakow (Poland)

9 October Friendly match	Germany	4–2	Australia	Karlsruhe
20:30	Kössler 23', 30'; Küver 83'; Nüsken 90+4'	Report	Kerr 45+2'; McNamara 90+3'	Stadium: Wildparkstadion; Attendance: 26,352; Referee: Olivia Tschon (Austria)

13 October Friendly match	Germany	2–1	Japan	Bremen
17:45	Dallmann 28'; Bühl 73'	Report	Tanikawa 15'	Stadium: Weserstadion; Attendance: 26,574; Referee: Karoline Marie Jensen (Norway)

29 November Friendly match	Argentina	v	Germany	La Plata
20:15 UTC−3		Report		Stadium: Estadio Único Diego Armando Maradona

4 December Friendly match	Germany	v	Peru	Rio de Janeiro, Brazil
18:15 UTC−3		Report		Stadium: São Januário

=== 2027 ===
2 March Nations League GS	Sweden	v	Germany
		Report

6 March Nations League GS	Germany	v	Scotland
		Report

20 April Nations League GS	Germany	v	Netherlands
		Report

24 April Nations League GS	Netherlands	v	Germany
		Report

11 June Nations League GS	Scotland	v	Germany
		Report

15 June Nations League GS	Germany	v	Sweden
		Report

== Coaching staff ==
=== Current technical staff ===
Position	Name
Head coach	Christian Wück
Assistant coaches	Maren Meinert; Saskia Bartusiak
Fitness coach	Julius Balsmeier
Goalkeeping coach	Michael Fuchs
Team doctor	Tobias Schmenn
Kit Manager	Steve Smith

=== Manager history ===
Name	Tenure	P	W	D	L	%	Achievements
(Germany) Gero Bisanz	1982–1996	127	83	17	27	65.35	1984 European Championship – failed to qualify 1987 UEFA Euro – failed to qualify 1989 UEFA Euro – champions 1991 UEFA Euro – champions 1991 Women's World Cup – fourth place 1993 UEFA Euro – fourth place 1995 UEFA Euro – champions 1995 Women's World Cup – runners-up 1996 Summer Olympics – group stage
(Germany) Tina Theune	1996–2005	135	93	18	24	68.89	1997 UEFA Euro – champions 1999 Women's World Cup – quarter-final 2000 Summer Olympics – bronze medal 2001 UEFA Euro – champions 2003 Women's World Cup – champions 2004 Summer Olympics – bronze medal 2005 UEFA Euro – champions
(Germany) Silvia Neid	2005–2016	169	125	22	22	73.96	2007 Women's World Cup – champions 2008 Summer Olympics – bronze medal 2009 UEFA Euro – champions 2011 Women's World Cup – quarter-final 2012 Summer Olympics – failed to qualify 2013 UEFA Euro – champions 2015 Women's World Cup – fourth place 2016 Summer Olympics – champions
(Germany) Steffi Jones	2016–2018	22	13	4	5	59.09	2017 UEFA Euro – quarter-final
(Germany) Horst Hrubesch (interim)	2018	8	7	1	0	87.50	
(Germany) Martina Voss-Tecklenburg	2019–2023	57	40	5	12	70.18	2019 Women's World Cup – quarter-final 2020 Summer Olympics – failed to qualify 2022 UEFA Euro – runners-up
(Germany) Horst Hrubesch (interim)	2023–2024	18	12	2	4	66.67	2024 Summer Olympics – bronze medal
(Germany) Christian Wück	2024–	24	14	5	5	58.33	2025 UEFA Euro – semi-final
Total		559	386	74	99	69.05	

*Key: P–games played, W–games won, D–games drawn; L–games lost, %–win percentage. Statistics as of 5 June 2026.

Gero Bisanz, then the chief instructor for DFB coaching training, was appointed in 1982 as the first coach of the women's national team and led the team to three European Championships in 1989, 1991 and 1995. Germany also was runners-up at the 1995 Women's World Cup. He resigned after the German team was eliminated in Round 1 at the 1996 Summer Olympics. Tina Theune, a longtime assistant and the first woman to acquire the highest German football coaching license, took over as head coach after the 1996 Summer Olympics. She is the most successful coach in the team's history, with three European Championship titles and the 2003 Women's World Cup title. During her time as head coach, Germany also won the bronze medal at the 2000 and 2004 Summer Olympics. Theune benefited from an effective youth programme and integrated several Under-19 players into the national team. She stepped down after winning the European Championship in 2005.

Silvia Neid became head coach in 2005 after her promotion from assistant coach and head coach of the under-19 team. By winning the 2007 Women's World Cup, Neid became the first Germany national team coach of either gender to win the World Cup at the first attempt. At her first Summer Olympics as a coach in 2008, Germany won the bronze medal for a third time. Neid was also responsible for Germany's seventh European Championship in 2009. She coached the Germany national team until 2016 and her assistant was Ulrike Ballweg. Steffi Jones was chosen as head coach ahead of Neid's retirement and was replaced by interim head coach Horst Hrubesch from March to November 2018. Martina Voss-Tecklenburg then became the new coach in 2019; the contract was voided in November 2023 after a group stage exit in the 2023 FIFA Women's World Cup. After another interim stint for Hrubesch through the 2024 Summer Olympics, Christian Wück took over as head coach. His official title is DFB-Trainer.

== Players ==
=== Current squad ===
The following players were called up for the friendly matches against Australia and Japan on 9 and 13 October 2026, respectively.

Caps and goals correct as of 13 October 2026, after the match against Japan.

No.	Pos.	Player	Date of birth (age)	Caps	Goals	Club
1	GK	Ena Mahmutovic	23 December 2003 (age 22)	4	0	(German Football Association) Bayern Munich
12	GK	Stina Johannes	23 January 2000 (age 26)	5	0	(German Football Association) VfL Wolfsburg
21	GK	Laura Dick	13 June 2003 (age 23)	0	0	(German Football Association) TSG Hoffenheim
2	DF	Marie Müller	25 July 2000 (age 26)	3	1	(United States Soccer Federation) Portland Thorns FC
3	DF	Camilla Küver	10 June 2003 (age 23)	7	1	(German Football Association) VfL Wolfsburg
4	DF	Luzie Zähringer	10 May 2008 (age 18)	0	0	(German Football Association) VfB Stuttgart
5	DF	Janina Minge	11 June 1999 (age 27)	35	1	(German Football Association) VfL Wolfsburg
7	DF	Sarai Linder	26 October 1999 (age 27)	36	1	(German Football Association) VfL Wolfsburg
13	DF	Carlotta Wamser	1 November 2003 (age 23)	16	2	(German Football Association) Bayer Leverkusen
17	DF	Franziska Kett	24 October 2004 (age 22)	15	0	(German Football Association) Bayern Munich
23	DF	Sophia Kleinherne	12 April 2000 (age 26)	39	1	(German Football Association) VfL Wolfsburg
9	MF	Sjoeke Nüsken	22 January 2001 (age 25)	61	8	(The Football Association) Chelsea
11	MF	Shekiera Martinez	4 July 2001 (age 25)	6	1	(The Football Association) Tottenham Hotspur
16	MF	Linda Dallmann	2 September 1994 (age 32)	79	16	(German Football Association) Bayern Munich
20	MF	Elisa Senß	1 October 1997 (age 29)	38	4	(Royal Spanish Football Federation) Real Madrid
22	MF	Jule Brand	16 October 2002 (age 24)	77	13	(French Football Federation) Lyon
24	MF	Lisa Baum	26 November 2006 (age 19)	1	0	(The Football Association) Arsenal
8	FW	Nicole Anyomi	10 February 2000 (age 26)	36	4	(German Football Association) Eintracht Frankfurt
10	FW	Laura Freigang	1 February 1998 (age 28)	44	17	(German Football Association) Eintracht Frankfurt
14	FW	Cora Zicai	29 November 2004 (age 21)	8	2	(German Football Association) VfL Wolfsburg
18	FW	Melissa Kössler	4 March 2000 (age 26)	6	2	(United States Soccer Federation) Denver Summit FC
19	FW	Klara Bühl	7 December 2000 (age 25)	80	31	(German Football Association) Bayern Munich

=== Recent call-ups ===
The following players have also been called up to the squad within the past 12 months.

Pos.	Player	Date of birth (age)	Caps	Goals	Club	Latest call-up
GK	Ann-Katrin Berger	9 October 1990 (age 36)	34	0	(United States) Gotham FC	v. Slovenia, 9 June 2026
DF	Bibiane Schulze ^{INJ}	12 November 1998 (age 28)	7	0	(Spain) Athletic Bilbao	v. Australia, 9 October 2026
DF	Giulia Gwinn ^{INJ} (captain)	2 July 1999 (age 27)	71	14	(Germany) Bayern Munich	v. Australia, 9 October 2026
DF	Kathrin Hendrich	6 April 1992 (age 34)	91	5	(United States) Chicago Stars	v. Slovenia, 9 June 2026
DF	Rebecca Knaak	23 June 1996 (age 30)	15	0	(England) Manchester City	v. Slovenia, 9 June 2026
DF	Jella Veit	3 May 2005 (age 21)	1	0	(Germany) Union Berlin	v. Austria, 18 April 2026
MF	Lisanne Gräwe	11 February 2003 (age 23)	6	0	(Germany) Union Berlin	v. Slovenia, 9 June 2026
MF	Sydney Lohmann	19 June 2000 (age 26)	44	6	(England) Manchester City	v. Spain, 2 December 2025
MF	Alara Şehitler	27 November 2006 (age 19)	4	0	(Germany) Bayern Munich	v. Spain, 2 December 2025
FW	Lea Schüller ^{MED}	12 November 1997 (age 29)	87	56	(England) Manchester United	v. Australia, 9 October 2026
FW	Selina Cerci ^{INJ}	31 May 2000 (age 26)	20	5	(England) Arsenal	v. Australia, 9 October 2026
FW	Larissa Mühlhaus	13 January 2003 (age 23)	4	1	(Germany) Werder Bremen	v. Australia, 9 October 2026
FW	Vivien Endemann ^{INJ}	7 August 2001 (age 25)	21	4	(England) Liverpool	v. Australia, 9 October 2026
Notes: ^{INJ} = Withdrew due to injury; ^{MED} = Withdrew due to medical reasons; ^{PRE} = Preliminary squad; ^{RET} = Retired from the national team; ^{WD} = Player withdrew from the squad due to non-injury issue

== Records ==
As of 9 June 2026

Players in bold are still active with the national team.

=== Most appearances ===
Rank	Player	Career	Caps	Goals
1	Birgit Prinz	1994–2011	214	128
2	Kerstin Stegemann	1995–2009	191	8
3	Ariane Hingst	1996–2011	174	10
4	Anja Mittag	2004–2017	158	50
5	Bettina Wiegmann	1989–2003	154	51
6	Renate Lingor	1995–2008	149	35
7	Sandra Minnert	1992–2007	147	16
8	Nadine Angerer	1996–2015	146	0
9	Alexandra Popp	2010–2024	145	67
10	Doris Fitschen	1986–2001	144	16

=== Top goalscorers ===
Rank	Player	Career	Goals	Caps	Avg.
1	Birgit Prinz	1994–2011	128	214	0.60
2	Heidi Mohr	1986–1996	83	104	0.80
3	Alexandra Popp	2010–2024	67	145	0.46
4	Inka Grings	1996–2012	64	96	0.67
5	Célia Šašić	2005–2015	63	111	0.57
6	**Lea Schüller**	2017–present	56	87	0.64
7	Bettina Wiegmann	1989–2003	51	154	0.33
8	Anja Mittag	2004–2017	50	158	0.32
9	Silvia Neid	1982–1996	48	111	0.43
10	Kerstin Garefrekes	2001–2011	43	130	0.33

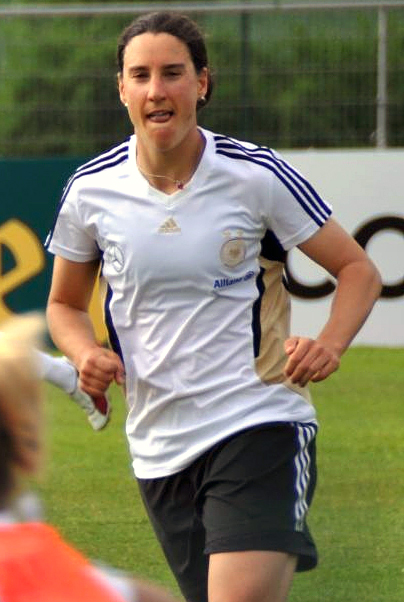
Birgit Prinz is the most capped German player with 214 caps, and the top ever scorer with 128.

Birgit Prinz, a former team captain who retired after the 2011 World Cup, holds the record for Germany for appearances, having played 214 times from 1994 to 2011. She is one of 21 German players to have reached 100 caps. Kerstin Stegemann is second, having played 191 times. Bettina Wiegmann, Germany's team captain during the 2003 World Cup win, comes fourth with 154 games. Prinz exceeded Wiegmann's record as the most capped player in November 2006. Prinz also held the record for most appearances by a European player until 15 June 2021, when she was surpassed by Sweden's Caroline Seger.

Wiegmann and Prinz have successively been awarded the title of honorary captain of the German women's national football team.

The title of Germany's highest goalscorer is also held by Prinz. She scored her first goal in July 1994 against Canada and finished her career with 128 goals (averaging 0.60 goals per game). Heidi Mohr, as well as being the second-highest scorer, is also the most prolific with 83 goals coming from 104 games (averaging 0.80 goals per game). Two players share the record for goals scored in one match: Conny Pohlers scored five goals in October 2001 against Portugal, and Inka Grings scored five times in February 2004, again facing Portugal. Silvia Neid, the former Germany national coach, is the sixth highest goalscorer with 48 goals in 111 games.

The largest margin of victory achieved by Germany is 17–0 against Kazakhstan during a European Championship qualifying game in November 2011. The record defeat, a 6–0 loss against the United States, occurred during a friendly match in March 1996.

Former goalkeeper Nadine Angerer has the most appearances for a goalkeeper, with 145 games as goal keeper (89 without conceding a goal) and one game as a substitute as defender. Silke Rottenberg is second with 126 caps and 68 games without conceding a goal. Bettina Wiegmann holds the record of 14 goals from penalty kicks; Renate Lingor comes in second with 8 goals. Tina Wunderlich scored the team's only own goal in the semi-final of the 2000 Summer Olympics against Norway; it was the game's only goal.

The German team also holds several international records. In 2007, they were the first to win two consecutive Women's World Cup titles and they achieved the then-biggest win in tournament history by beating Argentina 11–0, Germany is also the only team to win the women's World Cup without conceding a goal and the only country to win both World Cups. With 14 goals, Prinz became the overall top goalscorer at the Women's World Cup in 2007, and she and Brazilian Marta are the only women to have received the FIFA World Player of the Year award at least three times.

=== Player of the Year ===
- 2017: Linda Dallmann
- 2018: Svenja Huth
- 2019: Giulia Gwinn
- 2020: Lena Oberdorf
- 2021: Lea Schüller
- 2022: Alexandra Popp
- 2023: Klara Bühl
- 2024: Giulia Gwinn

== Competitive record ==
=== FIFA Women's World Cup ===
Germany is one of the most successful nations at the FIFA Women's World Cup, having won the tournament twice and finishing runner-up once. The German team won the World Cup in 2003 and 2007. At the first World Cup in 1991, they finished in fourth place. In 1995, Germany reached the World Cup final, but were defeated by Norway. The team's worst result was a Group stage exit in 2023. Overall, the German team has appeared in three Women's World Cup finals, and is a five-time semi-finalist. They have participated in every Women's World Cup and have a 31–6–10 win–draw–loss record.

FIFA Women's World Cup record								Qualification record					
Year	Result	Pld	W	D	L	GF	GA	Pld	W	D	L	GF	GA
(China) 1991	Fourth place	6	4	0	2	13	10	UEFA Women's Euro 1991					
(Sweden) 1995	Runners-up	6	4	0	2	13	6	UEFA Women's Euro 1995					
(United States) 1999	Quarter-finals	4	1	2	1	12	7	8	5	1	2	15	6
(United States) 2003	Champions	6	6	0	0	25	4	6	6	0	0	30	1
(China) 2007	Champions	6	5	1	0	21	0	8	8	0	0	31	3
(Germany) 2011	Quarter-finals	4	3	0	1	7	4	Qualified as host					
(Canada) 2015	Fourth place	7	3	2	2	20	6	10	10	0	0	62	4
(France) 2019	Quarter-finals	5	4	0	1	10	2	8	7	0	1	38	3
(Australia) (New Zealand) 2023	Group stage	3	1	1	1	8	3	10	9	0	1	47	5
(Brazil) 2027	Qualified							6	5	1	0	18	1
(Costa Rica) (Jamaica) (Mexico) (United States) 2031	To be determined							To be determined					
(United Kingdom) 2035	To be determined							To be determined					
Total:10/10	2 Titles	47	31	6*	10	129	42	50	45	1*	4	223	20

*Denotes draws including knockout matches decided on penalty kicks.
**Gold background colour indicates that the tournament was won.
***Red border colour indicates tournament was held on home soil.

=== Olympic Games ===
Women's football debuted at the 1996 Summer Olympics and Bettina Wiegmann scored the first Olympic goal in the opening game of the tournament. However, Germany failed to progress to the knockout stage and was eliminated in the group stages. Four years later the German team won the bronze medal at the 2000 Summer Olympics. They again finished third at both the 2004 and the 2008 Summer Olympics.

The German team qualified for all Women's Olympic Football Tournaments until 2008. However, they failed to qualify for the 2012 tournament as UEFA used the 2011 World Cup for qualification, and Germany ended below France and Sweden. The German team beat Sweden in the Olympics final in Rio in 2016 to obtain their first Olympic gold medal.

Summer Olympics record
Year	Result	Pld	W	D	L	GF	GA
(United States) 1996	Group stage	3	1	1	1	6	6
(Australia) 2000	Bronze medalists	5	4	0	1	8	2
(Greece) 2004	Bronze medalists	5	4	0	1	14	3
(China) 2008	Bronze medalists	6	4	1	1	7	4
(United Kingdom) 2012	Did not qualify						
(Brazil) 2016	Gold medalists	6	4	1	1	14	6
(Japan) 2020	Did not qualify						
(France) 2024	Bronze medalists	6	3	1	2	9	6
(United States) 2028	To be determined						
(Australia) 2032	To be determined						
Total:6/8	1 Title	31	20	4	7	58	27

=== UEFA Women's Championship ===
Germany failed to qualify for the first two UEFA European Championships in 1984 and 1987. Since 1989, the German team has participated in every tournament and is the record European champion with eight titles. Germany has won six consecutive championships from 1995 to 2013 and has an overall finals record of 38 wins, 7 draws, and 6 losses.

UEFA Women's Championship record								Qualifying record							
Year	Result	Pld	W	D	L	GF	GA	Pld	W	D	L	GF	GA	P/R	Rnk
1984****	Did not qualify							6	0	5	1	6	7	–	
(Norway) 1987	Did not qualify							6	2	1	3	5	7	–	
(West Germany) 1989	Champions	2	1	1	0	5	2	8	5	3	0	21	1	–	
(Denmark) 1991	Champions	2	2	0	0	6	1	8	7	1	0	24	2	–	
(Italy) 1993	Fourth place	2	0	1	1	2	4	3	2	1	0	10	0	–	
(England) (Germany) (Norway) (Sweden) 1995	Champions	3	3	0	0	9	4	8	8	0	0	60	0	–	
(Norway) (Sweden) 1997	Champions	5	3	2	0	6	1	8	6	1	1	22	3	–	
(Germany) 2001	Champions	5	5	0	0	13	1	6	5	1	0	27	5	–	
(England) 2005	Champions	5	5	0	0	15	2	8	8	0	0	50	2	–	
(Finland) 2009	Champions	6	6	0	0	21	5	8	8	0	0	34	1	–	
(Sweden) 2013	Champions	6	4	1	1	6	1	10	9	1	0	64	3	–	
(Netherlands) 2017	Quarter-finals	4	2	1	1	5	3	8	8	0	0	35	0	–	
(England) 2022	Runners-up	6	5	0	1	14	3	8	8	0	0	46	1	–	
(Switzerland) 2025	Semi-finals	5	2	1	2	6	7	6	5	0	1	17	8	(Note: From Euro 2025 onwards a new qualifying format was introduced, linked to the Women's Nations League where teams are divided into leagues with promotion/relegation between the leagues at the end of each cycle.)	3rd
(Germany) 2029	Qualified as host							Qualified as host							
Total	13/15	51	38	7*	6	108	34	101	81	14*	6	421	40	3rd	

*Denotes draws including knockout matches decided on penalty kicks.
**Gold background colour indicates that the tournament was won.
***Red border colour indicates tournament was held on home soil.
****Missing flag indicates no host country; tournament was played in two-leg knockout rounds (with the exception of the 1995 final).

=== UEFA Women's Nations League ===
UEFA Women's Nations League record
League phase												Finals							
Season	LG	GP	Pos	Pld	W	D	L	GF	GA	P/R	Rnk	Year	Pos	Pld	W	D	L	GF	GA
2023/24	A	3	1st	6	4	1	1	14	3	Same position	3rd	(France) (Netherlands) (Spain) 2024	3rd	2	1	0	1	3	2
2025	A	1	1st	6	5	1	0	26	4	Same position	2nd	(France) (Germany) (Spain) (Sweden) 2025	2nd	4	1	2	1	3	5
Total				12	9	2	1	40	7	3rd and 2nd		Total	0 Titles	6	2	2	2	6	7

▲	Promoted at end of season
Same position	No movement at end of season
▼	Relegated at end of season
*	Participated in promotion/relegation play-offs

== Honours ==
=== Major competitions ===
- FIFA Women's World Cup
  - Champions (2): 2003, 2007
  - Runners-up (1): 1995
- UEFA Women's Championship
  - Champions (8): 1989, 1991, 1995, 1997, 2001, 2005, 2009, 2013
  - Runners-up (1): 2022
- Summer Olympic Games
  - Gold Medal (1): 2016
  - Bronze Medal (4): 2000, 2004, 2008, 2024
- UEFA Women's Nations League
  - Runners-up (1): 2025
  - Third place (1): 2024

=== Summary ===
Competition	1st place, gold medalist(s)	2nd place, silver medalist(s)	3rd place, bronze medalist(s)	Total
FIFA Women's World Cup	2	1	0	3
UEFA Women's Championship	8	1	0	9
Summer Olympic Games	1	0	4	5
UEFA Women's Nations League	0	1	1	2
Total	11	2	5	18

=== Friendly ===
- Algarve Cup
  - Champions (4): 2006, 2012, 2014, 2020
  - Runners-up (3): 2005, 2010, 2013
  - Third place (1): 2015
- Women's World Invitational Tournament
  - Champions (2): 1981, (Note: by Bergisch Gladbach (women)) 1984 (Note: by Bergisch Gladbach (women))
  - Third place (1): 1987 (Note: by Bergisch Gladbach (women))
- SheBelieves Cup
  - Runners-up (2): 2016, 2017
- Four Nations Tournament
  - Runners-up (1): 2002
  - Third place (3): 2003, 2005, 2007
- Mundialito Cup
  - Runners-up (1): 1984

=== Awards ===
FIFA Women's World Cup Fair Play Trophy

- Winners: 1991

FIFA Women's World Cup Most Entertaining Team

- Winners: 2003

German Sports Team of the Year

- Winners: 2003, 2009

Silbernes Lorbeerblatt

- Winners: 1989, 1991, 1995, 1997, 2001, 2003, 2005, 2007, 2009, 2013, 2016

Bambi Award

- Winners: 2003, 2007

== Titles ==
Awards and achievements
Preceded by 1999 United States	World Champions; 2003 (first title); 2007 (second title)	Succeeded by 2011 Japan
Preceded by 2012 United States	Olympic champions 2016 (first title)	Succeeded by 2020 Canada
Preceded by 1987 Norway	European Champions; 1989 (first title); 1991 (second title)	Succeeded by 1993 Norway
Preceded by 1993 Norway	European Champions; 1995 (third title); 1997 (fourth title); 2001 (fifth title); 2005 (sixth title); 2009 (seventh title); 2013 (eighth title)	Succeeded by 2017 Netherlands

== See also ==
- Sport in Germany
  - Football in Germany
    - Women's football in Germany
- Germany women's national football team
  - Germany women's national football team results
  - List of Germany women's international footballers
- Germany women's national youth football team
  - Germany women's national under-23 football team
  - Germany women's national under-21 football team
  - Germany women's national under-20 football team
  - Germany women's national under-19 football team
  - Germany women's national under-17 football team
