= 2026–27 FC Barcelona Femení season =

Football season

Barcelona Femení
2026–27 season
- President: Joan Laporta
- Head coach: Pere Romeu
- Stadium: Johan Cruyff Stadium; Camp Nou (select matches)
- Liga F: 1st
- Copa de la Reina: Round of 16
- Supercopa de España: Semi-finals
- UEFA Champions League: League Phase
- FIFA Champions Cup: Semi-finals
- Top goalscorer: League: Clàudia Pina (11); All: Clàudia Pina (18)
- Average home league attendance: 12,215
Home colours	Away colours	Third colours
- All statistics correct as of 19 November 2026.

The 2026–27 season is the 39th and current season in the history of FC Barcelona Femení. The team is competing in the domestic league, the Copa de la Reina, Supercopa de España Femenina, the UEFA Women's Champions League and the FIFA Champions Cup. They are the defending champions of the former four, and competing for the first time in the latter.

== Kits ==
- Supplier: Nike
- Sponsors: Spotify (front) / Bimbo (sleeves) / Barça Foundation (back)

Home	Home alternate	Away	Third

== Players ==
=== First team ===
No.	Pos.	Nat.	Name	Age	EU	Since	App.	Goals	Ends	Notes
Goalkeepers
1	GK	(Spain)	Gemma Font	27	EU	2018	52	0	2027	Made in La Masia
13	GK	(Spain)	Cata Coll	25	EU	2019	134	0	2029	
25	GK	(United States)	Tyler McCamey	25	Non-EU	2026	0	0	2028	
Defenders
2	DF	(Spain)	Irene Paredes (3rd captain)	35	EU	2021	189	20	2027	
3	DF	(Netherlands)	Renee van Asten	20	EU	2026	10	2	2030	
5	DF	(Spain)	Laia Aleixandri	26	EU	2025	21	4	2029	Made in La Masia
8	DF	(Spain)	Marta Torrejón (vice-captain)	36	EU	2013	502	75	2027	
21	DF	(Spain)	Carla Julià	19	EU	2025	29	7	2030	
22	DF	(Netherlands)	Esmee Brugts	23	EU	2023	140	35	2027	
23	DF	(Spain)	Aïcha Cámara	19	EU	2023	53	1	2028	Made in La Masia
24	DF	(Spain)	Martina Fernández	22	EU	2026	44	2	2029	
Midfielders
6	FW	(Switzerland)	Sydney Schertenleib	19	EU	2024	81	14	2027	
12	MF	(Spain)	Patricia Guijarro (captain)	28	EU	2015	392	79	2027	
14	MF	(Spain)	Aitana Bonmatí (4th captain)	28	EU	2016	349	119	2028	Made in La Masia
16	MF	(Spain)	Clara Serrajordi	18	EU	2024	57	4	2028	Made in La Masia
18	MF	(Portugal)	Kika Nazareth	24	EU	2024	77	20	2028	
19	MF	(Spain)	Vicky López	20	EU	2022	136	34	2028	Made in La Masia
Forwards
7	FW	(Brazil)	Kerolin	27	Non-EU	2026	12	3	2030	
9	FW	(Spain)	Clàudia Pina	25	EU	2017	236	121	2029	Made in La Masia
10	FW	(Norway)	Caroline Graham Hansen (5th captain)	31	EU	2019	246	121	2028	
17	FW	(Poland)	Ewa Pajor	29	EU	2024	103	82	2027	

- Last updated: 19 November 2026
- Source: FCBarcelona.com, LigaF.es, UEFA.com
- Ordered by squad number.

=== Reserve team ===
N	Pos.	Nat.	Name	Age	EU	Since	App	Goals	Ends	Transfer fee	Notes
26	DF	(Spain)	Julia Torres	17	EU	2024	1	0			
27	MF	(Spain)	Rosalía Domínguez	18	EU	2024	13	0			
28	FW	(Spain)	Lúa Arufe	18	EU	2026	8	0			
29	MF	(Spain)	Carolina Ferrera	16	EU	2026	5	1	2029		
30	DF	(Spain)	Charlotta Ohlander	16	EU	2025	0	0	2029		
31	FW	(Morocco)	Mayssa Baha	15	EU	2026	7	1	2028		
32	DF	(Spain)	Maria Llorella	20	EU	2022	4	0		Youth system	
33	DF	(Spain)	Daniela Martínez	19	EU	2023	0	0	2028	Youth system	
34	FW	(Netherlands)	Liv Pennock	18	EU	2026	0	0			
35	MF	(Spain)	Elena Vizuete	16	EU	2023	2	0	2028	Youth system	
36	FW	(Denmark)	Nikoline Nielsen	17	EU	2026	0	0	2028		
38	MF	(Spain)	Laia Cabetas	17	EU	2025	2	0	2028	Youth system	
39	DF	(Spain)	Noa Jiménez	18	EU	2026	3	0	2028	Youth system	
40	FW	(Spain)	Lídia Gilbert	16	EU	2024	0	0	2028	Youth system	
41	DF	(Spain)	Martina González	18	EU	2023	3	0	2026	Youth system	
42	FW	(Spain)	Anna Quer	18	EU	2025	0	0			
43	DF	(Spain)	Julia Pastor	17	EU	2026	0	0		Youth system	
45	FW	(Italy)	Giulia Galli	18	EU	2026	0	0			
46	FW	(Morocco)	Kautar Azraf	18	EU	2025	0	0		Youth system	
	MF	(Spain)	Bea Pérez	18	EU	2023	0	0	2028	Youth system	

- Last updated: 19 November 2026
- Source: FCBarcelona.com
- Ordered by squad number.

=== Contract renewals ===
No.	Pos.	Nat.	Name	Date	Until	Source
Coach		(Spain)	Pere Romeu	17 June 2026	30 June 2028	
10	FW	(Norway)	Caroline Graham Hansen	15 July 2026	30 June 2028	
8	DF	(Spain)	Marta Torrejón	24 July 2026	30 June 2027	
21	DF	(Spain)	Carla Julià	24 July 2026	30 June 2030	
26	DF	(Portugal)	Iara Lobo	4 August 2026	30 June 2028	

== Transfers ==
As with the previous summer, Barcelona faced a large exodus of its best players and mid-transfer window had amassed 19 senior team departures since 2024. The 2025 exits were considered a financial sacrifice in order to be able to renew key players in 2026; instead, those players all left for free upon expiration of their contracts, largely to foreign (particularly English) teams. Meanwhile, signings were predominantly foreign academy products, with Barcelona's own top-level youth players also leaving the club in larger numbers than expected. This was considered a failure of internal management at the club, as it should not expect to struggle to retain players with its multi-champion sporting programme, despite financial failings in other departments of the wider club restricting the team's spending ability.

=== In ===
No.	Pos.	Nat.	Player	Moving from	Type	Fee	Source
Summer
	DF	(Spain)	Julia Torres	Sevilla	Transfer	€300,000	
	DF	(Spain)	Laura Martín	Villarreal	Loan return		
	MF	(Poland)	Weronika Araśniewicz	(Germany) VfL Wolfsburg	Loan return		
	MF	(Italy)	Giulia Dragoni	(Italy) AS Roma	Loan return		
	DF	(Netherlands)	Renee van Asten	(Netherlands) AFC Ajax	Transfer	Undisclosed fee	
	GK	(United States)	Tyler McCamey	(United States) Dallas Trinity FC	Free transfer		
	DF	(Spain)	Martina Fernández	(England) Everton	Transfer	Undisclosed fee	
	GK	(Canada)	Khadijah Cissé	(United States) Kentucky Wildcats	Free transfer		
	FW	(Brazil)	Kerolin	(England) Manchester City	Transfer	€1,500,000	
Total				€1,800,000			

=== Out ===
No.	Pos.	Nat.	Player	Moving to	Type	Fee	Source
Summer
11	MF	(Spain)	Alexia Putellas	(England) London City Lionesses	End of contract		
4	DF	(Spain)	Mapi León	(England) London City Lionesses	End of contract		
22	DF	(Spain)	Ona Batlle	(England) Arsenal	End of contract		
	MF	(Spain)	Emma Gálvez	CD Tenerife B	End of contract		
42	FW	(Spain)	Natalia Escot	Espanyol	End of contract		
25	GK	(Spain)	Txell Font	Badalona Women	End of contract		
7	FW	(Spain)	Salma Paralluelo	(France) OL Lyonnes	End of contract		
33	DF	(Spain)	Noah Bezis Ureña		End of contract		
38	FW	(Spain)	Laia Martret	(Germany) Hoffenheim	Transfer	Undisclosed fee	
35	FW	(Norway)	Martine Fenger	(Germany) Hoffenheim	Transfer	Undisclosed fee	
39	MF	(Spain)	Ainoa Gómez	Deportivo Abanca	Loan		
40	DF	(Spain)	Adriana Ranera	Deportivo Abanca	Loan		
	MF	(Spain)	Montse Alabart	Villarreal	Loan		
	MF	(Poland)	Weronika Araśniewicz	(Germany) VfL Wolfsburg	Transfer	Undisclosed fee	
32	FW	(Spain)	Celia Segura	Atlético Madrid	Loan		
	MF	(Italy)	Giulia Dragoni	(England) Chelsea	Transfer	>€500,000	
26	DF	(Portugal)	Iara Lobo	(Italy) Parma	Loan		

== Pre-season and friendlies ==
Win Draw Loss Fixtures

12 August 2026 Friendly	Barcelona	3–1	(France) Montpellier	Sant Joan Despí
19:00 CEST	Guijarro 45+2'; Pina 57'; Baha 83'	Report	Torrent (yellow card) 45'; Rouquet 51'; Chabod (yellow card) 65'; Lair (yellow card) 65'	Stadium: Johan Cruyff Stadium; Referee: Ainara Andrea

15 August 2026 Friendly	Manchester City (England)	2–2	Barcelona	Manchester
17:00 CEST	Greenwood 57'; Clinton 67'	Report	Graham 5'; López 24'	Stadium: Academy Stadium

21 August 2026 Joan Gamper Trophy	Barcelona	3–1	(England) Brighton	Sant Joan Despí
20:00 CEST	Brugts 6'; Pina 22'; Graham 32'	Report	Seike 12'	Stadium: Johan Cruyff Stadium; Attendance: 3,904; Referee: Tetyana Fernández Vila

== Competitions ==
=== Overall record ===
Competition	First match	Last match	Starting round	Record							
Competition	First match	Last match	Starting round	Pld	W	D	L	GF	GA	GD	Win %
Liga F	30 August 2026	23 May 2027	Matchday 1	11	9	1	1	42	6	+36	81.82
Copa de la Reina			Round of 16					—			
Supercopa de España	19 January 2027	24 January 2027	Semi-finals					—			
UEFA Women's Champions League	23 September 2026		League phase	5	4	1	0	26	3	+23	80.00
FIFA Champions Cup	27 January 2027	31 January 2027	Semi-finals					—			
Total				16	13	2	1	68	9	+59	81.25

Last updated: 19 November 2026
Source: Competitions

Current position
Competition won

=== Liga F ===
==== League table ====
Pos	Team	Pld	W	D	L	GF	GA	GD	Pts	Qualification or relegation
1	Barcelona	11	9	1	1	42	6	+36	28	Qualification for the Champions League league phase
2	Real Madrid	11	7	3	1	26	21	+5	24	Qualification for the Champions League league phase
3	Atlético Madrid	11	7	1	3	24	13	+11	22	Qualification for the Champions League third qualifying round
4	Athletic Club	11	5	4	2	17	12	+5	19	
5	Tenerife	10	5	2	3	17	15	+2	17	

Updated to match(es) played on 15 November 2026. Source: LigaF.es
Rules for classification: 1) Points; 2) Head-to-head points; 3) Goal difference; 4) Number of goals scored

==== Results summary ====
Overall								Home						Away					
Pld	W	D	L	GF	GA	GD	Pts	W	D	L	GF	GA	GD	W	D	L	GF	GA	GD
11	9	1	1	42	6	+36	28	5	0	0	24	3	+21	4	1	1	18	3	+15

Last updated: 15 November 2026.
Source: La Liga

==== Results by round ====
Round	1	2	3	4	5	6	7	8	9	10	11	12	13	14	15	16	17	18	19	20	21	22	23	24	25	26	27	28	29	30
Ground	H	A	H	A	A	H	A	H	A	H	A	H	H	A	A	H	A	H	A	H	A	H	A	H	H	A	A	H	A	H
Result	W	W	W	W	W	W	L	W	W	W	D																			
Position	1	1	1	1	1	1	1	1	1	1	1	1																		
Points	3	6	9	12	15	18	18	21	24	27	28																			

Updated to match(es) played on 15 November 2026. Source: La Liga
A = Away; H = Home; W = Win; D = Draw; L = Loss; P = Postponed

==== Matches ====
30 August 2026 1	Barcelona	5–0	Tenerife	Sant Joan Despí
19:00 CEST	Graham 27'; Pina 39', (yellow card) 90+4'; Pajor 48'; van Asten 52'; Paredes 63'; Fernández (yellow card) 73'; Coll (yellow card) 81'	Report	Martín (yellow card) 66'; Koko (yellow card) 76'; Cabrera (yellow card) 90+4'	Stadium: Johan Cruyff Stadium; Attendance: 2,458; Referee: Lorena del Mar Trujillano Gallardo
Note: Renee van Asten's goal marks the 4000th goal of the club in all official competitions.

5 September 2026 2	Sevilla	0–4	Barcelona	Seville
20:30 CEST		Report	Brugts 9'; Pina 45+2'; Torrejón 45+5'; López 55'	Stadium: Estadio Jesús Navas; Attendance: 971; Referee: Melissa López Osorio
Note: This game marks Pere Romeu's 100th game as head coach.

12 September 2026 3	Barcelona	4–2	Atlético Madrid	Sant Joan Despí
19:00 CEST	López 26'; Brugts 49', 86', (yellow card) 90+3'; Graham 64'	Report	Poljak 9'; Jensen 54'	Stadium: Johan Cruyff Stadium; Attendance: 3,207; Referee: Lorena del Mar Trujillano

18 September 2026 4	Alavés	0–6	Barcelona	Vitoria-Gasteiz
20:00 CEST		Report	Graham (yellow card) 10', (goal) 19'; Schertenleib 30'; Ferrera 45'; Pina 55', 73', 90+4'	Stadium: Mendizorrotza Stadium; Attendance: 1,509; Referee: Alicia Espinosa

26 September 2026 5	Logroño United	0–2	Barcelona	Logroño
16:30 CEST		Report	Mayssa 17', (yellow card) 83'; Guijarro 71'	Stadium: Estadio Las Gaunas; Attendance: 1,837; Referee: Arantza Gallastegui
Note: At 15 years old, 8 months and 12 days, Mayssa Baha is the youngest player ever to score for the first team.

4 October 2026 6	Barcelona	7–0	Real Madrid	Barcelona
19:00 CEST	Pina 4', 28', 32', 45'; Graham 33'; Pajor 55'; Schertenleib 88'	Report	Navarro (yellow card) 19'; Caruso (yellow card) 52'; Caicedo (yellow card) 90'	Stadium: Camp Nou; Attendance: 40,533; Referee: María Gloria Planes
Note: Originally scheduled at 17:00 CEST but postponed to 19:00 due to weather conditions. Record assistance for a Liga F game.

18 October 2026 7	Real Sociedad	2–1	Barcelona	Zubieta
12:00 CEST	Marcos 13'; Marín 45+1'; Aparicio (yellow card) 58'; Álvarez (yellow card) 87'; Camino (yellow card) 88'	Report	Guijarro 1'; Fernández (yellow card) 18'; Bonmatí (yellow card) 33'; Romeu (yellow card) 85'	Stadium: Zubieta Facilities; Attendance: 1,245; Referee: Melissa López

24 October 2026 8	Barcelona	3–0	Granada	Sant Joan Despí
20:30 CEST	Guijarro (yellow card) 45+2'; Brugts 67'; Hansen 72'; Mérida 90' (o.g.)	Report		Stadium: Johan Cruyff Stadium; Attendance: 2,663; Referee: Eugenia Gil Soriano
Note: Game played with the "GOLF" logo on jerseys in place of Spotify.

1 November 2026 9	Badalona Women	0–4	Barcelona	Palamós
12:30 CET	Cubedo (yellow card) 44'; Llompart (yellow card) 48'; Pinillos (yellow card) 58'; Martínez (red card) 59'; Sarasola (yellow card) 90+3'	Report	Kerolin 5', 65'; Graham 61' (pen.); Fernández (yellow card) 63'; Pina 75'	Stadium: Estadi Palamós Costa Brava; Attendance: 2,810; Referee: Arantza Gallastegui

8 November 2026 10	Barcelona	5–1	Madrid CFF	Sant Joan Despí
16:00 CET	Brugts 39'; Pajor 45+1'; Julià 68'; Guijarro 73'; Pina 79'	Report	Carrasco (yellow card) 35'; González (yellow card) 36'; Konan 82', (yellow card) 88'; Holt (yellow card) 85'	Stadium: Johan Cruyff Stadium; Attendance: 2,572; Referee: Lorena Del Mar Trujillano
Note: Marks Marta Torrejón's 500th game and Ewa Pajor's 100th game.

15 November 2026 11	Deportivo Abanca	1–1	Barcelona	A Coruña
18:00 CET	Montesinos 48'	Report	Pina (yellow card) 79'; Romeu (yellow card) 89'; van Asten 90+12'	Stadium: Riazor; Attendance: 4,112; Referee: Elisabeth Calvo Valentín

22 November 2026 12	Barcelona	v	Athletic Club	Sant Joan Despí
19:00 CET				Stadium: Johan Cruyff Stadium

8 December 2026 13	Barcelona	v	Espanyol	Sant Joan Despí
17:00 CET				Stadium: Johan Cruyff Stadium

13 December 2026 14	Valencia	v	Barcelona	Paterna
				Stadium: Ciudad Deportiva de Paterna

10 January 2027 15	Eibar	v	Barcelona	Eibar
				Stadium: Ipurua Municipal Stadium

17 January 2027 16	Barcelona	v	Sevilla	Sant Joan Despí
				Stadium: Johan Cruyff Stadium

24 January 2027 17	Atlético Madrid	v	Barcelona	Alcalá de Henares
				Stadium: Centro Deportivo Wanda Alcalá de Henares

31 January 2027 18	Barcelona	v	Badalona Women	Sant Joan Despí
				Stadium: Johan Cruyff Stadium

7 February 2027 19	Granada	v	Barcelona	Granada
				Stadium: Ciudad Deportiva del Granada CF

14 February 2027 20	Barcelona	v	Logroño United	Sant Joan Despí
				Stadium: Johan Cruyff Stadium

21 February 2027 21	Real Madrid	v	Barcelona	Madrid
				Stadium: Alfredo Di Stéfano Stadium

14 March 2027 22	Barcelona	v	Alavés	Sant Joan Despí
				Stadium: Johan Cruyff Stadium

21 March 2027 23	Athletic Club	v	Barcelona	Biscay
				Stadium: Lezama Facilities

28 March 2027 24	Barcelona	v	Valencia	Sant Joan Despí
				Stadium: Johan Cruyff Stadium

4 April 2027 25	Barcelona	v	Eibar	Sant Joan Despí
				Stadium: Johan Cruyff Stadium

11 April 2027 26	Tenerife	v	Barcelona	Santa Cruz de Tenerife
				Stadium: Estadio Heliodoro Rodríguez López

2 May 2027 27	Espanyol	v	Barcelona	Sant Adrià de Besòs
				Stadium: Ciutat Esportiva Dani Jarque

9 May 2027 28	Barcelona	v	Real Sociedad	Sant Joan Despí
				Stadium: Johan Cruyff Stadium

19 May 2027 29	Madrid CFF	v	Barcelona	Fuenlabrada
				Stadium: Estadio Fernando Torres

23 May 2027 30	Barcelona	v	Deportivo Abanca	Sant Joan Despí
				Stadium: Johan Cruyff Stadium

=== UEFA Women's Champions League ===
==== League phase ====
Pos	Team	Pld	W	D	L	GF	GA	GD	Pts	Qualification
1	(Royal Spanish Football Federation) Barcelona (Q)	5	4	1	0	26	3	+23	13	Advance to the quarter-finals (seeded)
2	(French Football Federation) OL Lyonnes (Q)	5	4	1	0	22	0	+22	13	Advance to the quarter-finals (seeded)
3	(German Football Association) Bayern Munich (T)	5	3	2	0	13	5	+8	11	Advance to the quarter-finals (seeded)
4	(The Football Association) Chelsea (T)	5	3	2	0	4	0	+4	11	Advance to the quarter-finals (seeded)
5	(The Football Association) Manchester City (T)	5	2	3	0	10	5	+5	9 (Note: Ranked based on away goals scored, Manchester City 8, Real Madrid 3)	Advance to the knockout phase play-offs (seeded)

Updated to match(es) played on 19 November 2026. Source: UEFA
Rules for classification: League phase tiebreakers
(Q) Qualified for the phase indicated; (T) Qualified, but not yet for the particular phase indicated
Notes:

Round	1	2	3	4	5	6
Ground	H	A	A	H	H	A
Result	W	W	W	D	W	
Position	2	1	1	2	1	
Points	3	6	9	10	13	

Source: UEFA
A = Away; H = Home; W = Win; D = Draw; L = Loss

23 September 2026 1	Barcelona (Spain)	5–2	(France) Paris FC	Sant Joan Despí
21:00 CEST	Kerolin 18'; Serrajordi 28'; Piajor 35', 70'; Graham 43'	Report	Viens 5'; Baquerizo (yellow card) 22'; Mateo 73'	Stadium: Johan Cruyff Stadium; Attendance: 2,574; Referee: Michalina Diakow(Poland)
Note: This game marks the 900th victory for the team in all competitions.

30 September 2026 2	Roma (Italy)	0–6	(Spain) Barcelona	Rome, Italy
18:45 CEST		Report	Graham 19', 60'; Oladipo 39' (o.g.); Pina 53', 75'; Paredes (yellow card) 72'; Pajor 85'	Stadium: Stadio Tre Fontane; Attendance: 2,460; Referee: Kirsty Dowle (England)

29 October 2026 3	Køge (Denmark)	0–8	(Spain) Barcelona	Køge, Denmark
21:00 CET	Jereko (yellow card) 11'	Report	Graham 12' (pen.); Piajor 33'; Brugts 54'; Guijarro 59'; Serrajordi 62'; Kika 67'; Pina 70', 85'; Domínguez (yellow card) 90+3'	Stadium: Køge Stadium; Attendance: 5,884; Referee: Volha Blotskaya (Belarus)
Note: First game of Noa Jiménez with the first team.

12 November 2026 4	Barcelona (Spain)	1–1	(England) Arsenal	Barcelona
18:45 CET	Lluch (yellow card) 45+1'; Graham 59'; Cámara (yellow card) 66'	Report	Maanum 22', (yellow card) 55'; Russo (yellow card) 78'	Stadium: Camp Nou; Attendance: 26,171; Referee: Ivana Martinčić (Croatia)
Note: Originally scheduled on 11 November, but postponed due to a planned general strike in Spain.

19 November 2026 5	Barcelona (Spain)	6–0	(Switzerland) Servette	Sant Joan Despí
21:00 CET	Bonmatí 19'; Pina 26', 77', 88'; Brugts 31'; Graham 62' (pen.)	Report	Sobal (yellow card) 34'; Terchoun (yellow card) 53'; Nakkach (yellow card) 87'; Simon (yellow card) 90+1'	Stadium: Johan Cruyff Stadium; Attendance: 2,005; Referee: Franziska Wildfeuer (Germany)

16 December 2026 6	Bayern Munich (Germany)	v	(Spain) Barcelona	Unterhaching, Germany
21:00 CET				Stadium: Sportpark Unterhaching

=== Copa de la Reina ===
Barcelona entered the competition in the Round of 16.

December 2026 Round of 16	v
--:-- CET (UTC+1)

=== Supercopa de España Femenina ===
19 January 2027 Semi-final	Barcelona	v	Real Sociedad
--:-- CET (UTC+1)

=== FIFA Champions Cup ===
27 January 2027 Semi-final	Barcelona (Spain)	v	(Brazil) Cruzeiro	Miami, USA
16:30 EST (UTC−5)		Report		Stadium: Nu Stadium

== Statistics ==
=== Overall ===
As of 19 November 2026

No..	Pos.	Nat.	Player	Liga F		Copa de la Reina		Supercopa de España		Champions Cup		Champions League		Total		Discipline		Notes
No..	Pos.	Nat.	Player	Apps	Goals	Apps	Goals	Apps	Goals	Apps	Goals	Apps	Goals	Apps	Goals	Yellow card	Red card	Notes
Goalkeepers
1	GK	(Spain)	Gemma Font	3	0	0	0	0	0	0	0	0	0	3	0	0	0	
13	GK	(Spain)	Cata Coll	8	0	0	0	0	0	0	0	5	0	13	0	1	0	
25	GK	(United States)	Tyler McCamey	0	0	0	0	0	0	0	0	0	0	0	0	0	0	
Defenders
2	DF	(Spain)	Irene Paredes	5+1	1	0	0	0	0	0	0	3	0	9	1	1	0	
3	DF	(Netherlands)	Renee van Asten	5+2	2	0	0	0	0	0	0	2+1	0	10	2	0	0	
5	DF	(Spain)	Laia Aleixandri	0	0	0	0	0	0	0	0	0	0	0	0	0	0	
8	DF	(Spain)	Marta Torrejón	5+3	1	0	0	0	0	0	0	0+3	0	11	1	0	0	
21	DF	(Spain)	Carla Julià	3+3	1	0	0	0	0	0	0	0+2	0	8	1	0	0	
22	DF	(Netherlands)	Esmee Brugts	6+3	5	0	0	0	0	0	0	5	2	14	7	1	0	
23	DF	(Spain)	Aïcha Cámara	4+2	0	0	0	0	0	0	0	3+1	0	10	0	1	0	
24	DF	(Spain)	Martina Fernández	9+2	0	0	0	0	0	0	0	2+2	0	15	0	3	0	
39	DF	(Spain)	Noa Jiménez	1	0	0	0	0	0	0	0	0+2	0	3	0	0	0	
41	DF	(Spain)	Martina González	1+1	0	0	0	0	0	0	0	0	0	2	0	0	0	
Midfielders
6	MF	(Switzerland)	Sydney Schertenleib	8+3	2	0	0	0	0	0	0	5	0	16	2	0	0	
12	MF	(Spain)	Patricia Guijarro	6+5	3	0	0	0	0	0	0	5	1	16	4	1	0	
14	MF	(Spain)	Aitana Bonmatí	4+2	0	0	0	0	0	0	0	2+2	1	10	1	1	0	
16	MF	(Spain)	Clara Serrajordi	6+1	0	0	0	0	0	0	0	5	2	12	2	0	0	
18	MF	(Portugal)	Kika Nazareth	2+3	0	0	0	0	0	0	0	0+1	1	6	1	0	0	
19	MF	(Spain)	Vicky López	4	2	0	0	0	0	0	0	0	0	4	2	0	0	
27	MF	(Spain)	Rosalía Domínguez	4+2	0	0	0	0	0	0	0	0+4	0	10	0	1	0	
29	MF	(Spain)	Carolina Ferrera	2+2	1	0	0	0	0	0	0	0+1	0	5	1	0	0	
35	MF	(Spain)	Elena Vizuete	0+2	0	0	0	0	0	0	0	0	0	2	0	0	0	
38	MF	(Spain)	Laia Cabetas	1	0	0	0	0	0	0	0	0+1	0	2	0	0	0	
Forwards
7	FW	(Brazil)	Kerolin	7+3	2	0	0	0	0	0	0	2	1	12	3	0	0	
9	FW	(Spain)	Clàudia Pina	5+4	11	0	0	0	0	0	0	5	7	14	18	2	0	
10	FW	(Norway)	Caroline Graham Hansen	8+2	6	0	0	0	0	0	0	5	6	15	12	1	0	
17	FW	(Poland)	Ewa Pajor	9+1	3	0	0	0	0	0	0	5	4	15	7	0	0	
28	FW	(Spain)	Lúa Arufe	3+2	0	0	0	0	0	0	0	0+1	0	6	0	0	0	
31	FW	(Morocco)	Mayssa Baha	3+4	1	0	0	0	0	0	0	0	0	7	1	1	0	
Own goals (0)

=== Goalscorers ===
As of 19 November 2026

Rank	No.	Pos.	Nat.	Player	Liga F	Copa de la Reina	Supercopa de España	Champions Cup	Champions League	Total
1	9	FW	(Spain)	Clàudia Pina	11	—	—	—	7	18
2	10	FW	(Norway)	Caroline Graham Hansen	6	—	—	—	6	12
3	17	FW	(Poland)	Ewa Pajor	3	—	—	—	4	7
3	22	DF	(Netherlands)	Esmee Brugts	5	—	—	—	2	7
5	12	MF	(Spain)	Patri Guijarro	3	—	—	—	1	4
6	7	FW	(Brazil)	Kerolin	2	—	—	—	1	3
7	16	MF	(Spain)	Clara Serrajordi	—	—	—	—	2	2
7	19	MF	(Spain)	Vicky López	2	—	—	—	—	2
7	6	MF	(Switzerland)	Sydney Schertenleib	2	—	—	—	—	2
7	3	DF	(Netherlands)	Renee van Asten	2	—	—	—	—	2
11	14	MF	(Spain)	Aitana Bonmatí	—	—	—	—	1	1
11	18	MF	(Portugal)	Kika Nazareth	—	—	—	—	1	1
11	2	DF	(Spain)	Irene Paredes	1	—	—	—	—	1
11	8	DF	(Spain)	Marta Torrejón	1	—	—	—	—	1
11	21	DF	(Spain)	Carla Julià	2	—	—	—	—	1
11	29	MF	(Spain)	Carolina Ferrera	1	—	—	—	—	1
11	31	FW	(Morocco)	Mayssa Baha	1	—	—	—	—	1
Own goals (from the opponents)					1	—	—	—	1	2
Totals					42	—	—	—	26	68

=== Hat-tricks ===
Player	Against	Minutes	Score after goals	Result	Date	Competition	Ref
(Spain) Clàudia Pina	(Spain) Alavés	55', 73', 90+4'	0–4, 0–5, 0–6	0-6 (A)	18 September 2026	Liga F	
(Spain) Clàudia Pina^{4}	(Spain) Real Madrid	4', 28', 32', 45'	1–0, 2–0, 3–0, 5–0	7-0 (H)	4 October 2026	Liga F	
(Spain) Clàudia Pina	(Switzerland) Servette	26', 77', 88'	2–0, 5–0, 6–0	6-0 (H)	19 November 2026	Women's Champions League	

(H) – Home; (A) – Away; (N) – Neutral venue (final)
^{4} – Player scored four goals.

=== Assists ===
As of 18 November 2026

Rank	No.	Pos.	Nat.	Player	Liga F	Copa de la Reina	Supercopa de España	Champions Cup	Champions League	Total
1	10	FW	(Norway)	Caroline Graham Hansen	7	—	—	—	4	11
1	17	FW	(Poland)	Ewa Pajor	8	—	—	—	3	11
3	9	FW	(Spain)	Clàudia Pina	3	—	—	—	3	6
3	12	MF	(Spain)	Patri Guijarro	6	—	—	—	—	6
5	16	MF	(Spain)	Clara Serrajordi	—	—	—	—	3	3
6	3	DF	(Netherlands)	Renee van Asten	—	—	—	—	2	2
6	22	DF	(Netherlands)	Esmee Brugts	—	—	—	—	2	2
6	18	MF	(Portugal)	Kika Nazareth	1	—	—	—	1	2
6	14	MF	(Spain)	Aitana Bonmatí	1	—	—	—	1	2
6	7	FW	(Brazil)	Kerolin	2	—	—	—	—	2
11	6	MF	(Switzerland)	Sydney Schertenleib	—	—	—	—	1	1
11	8	DF	(Spain)	Marta Torrejón	1	—	—	—	—	1
11	21	DF	(Spain)	Carla Julià	1	—	—	—	—	1
11	27	MF	(Spain)	Rosalía Domínguez	1	—	—	—	—	1
Totals					31	—	—	—	20	51

=== Cleansheets ===
As of 19 November 2026

Rank	No.	Nat.	Player	Liga F	Copa de la Reina	Supercopa de España	Champions Cup	Champions League	Total
1	13	(Spain)	Cata Coll	5	—	—	—	3	8
2	1	(Spain)	Gemma Font	2	—	—	—	—	2
Totals				7	—	—	—	3	10

=== Disciplinary record ===
As of 15 November 2026

No.	Pos.	Nat.	Player	Liga F			Copa de la Reina			Supercopa de España			Champions Cup			Champions League			Total		
No.	Pos.	Nat.	Player	Yellow card	(yellow card) (yellow-red card)	Red card	Yellow card	(yellow card) (yellow-red card)	Red card	Yellow card	(yellow card) (yellow-red card)	Red card	Yellow card	(yellow card) (yellow-red card)	Red card	Yellow card	(yellow card) (yellow-red card)	Red card	Yellow card	(yellow card) (yellow-red card)	Red card
Coach		(Spain)	Pere Romeu	2															2		
Assistant Coach		(Spain)	Enric Lluch													1			1		
24	DF	(Spain)	Martina Fernández	3															3		
9	FW	(Spain)	Clàudia Pina	2															2		
2	DF	(Spain)	Irene Paredes													1			1		
23	DF	(Spain)	Aïcha Cámara													1			1		
27	MF	(Spain)	Rosalía Domínguez													1			1		
12	MF	(Spain)	Patri Guijarro	1															1		
13	GK	(Spain)	Cata Coll	1															1		
14	MF	(Spain)	Aitana Bonmatí	1															1		
31	FW	(Morocco)	Mayssa Baha	1															1		
10	FW	(Norway)	Caroline Graham Hansen	1															1		
22	DF	(Netherlands)	Esmee Brugts	1															1		
Totals				13												4			17		

Source: FCBarcelona.com
Ordered by (red card) , (second yellow card) and (yellow card)
(yellow card) = Number of bookings; (second yellow card) = Number of sending offs after a second yellow card; (red card) = Number of sending offs by a direct red card.

=== Injury record ===
No.	Pos.	Nat.	Name	Type	Status	Source	Match	Inj. Date	Ret. Date
14	MF	(Spain)	Aitana Bonmatí	left ankle disconfort		La Vanguardia	in training	July 2026	26 September 2026
18	MF	(Portugal)	Kika Nazareth	Adductor injury — left thigh		FCB X	in training	10 August 2026	4 September 2026
16	MF	(Spain)	Clara Serrajordi	Right radial styloid fracture		FCB X	in Spain U20 training	16 August 2026	18 September 2026
3	DF	(Netherlands)	Renee van Asten	Anterior rectus quadriceps overload — right leg		FCB X	in training	21 August 2026	30 August 2026
22	DF	(Netherlands)	Esmee Brugts	Tibialis posterior muscle injury — right leg		FCB X	in training	26 August 2026	4 September 2026
1	GK	(Spain)	Gemma Font	UCL thumb sprain — left hand		FCB X	in training	30 August 2026	12 September 2026
3	DF	(Netherlands)	Renee van Asten	Posterior myofascial injury — right rectus		FCB X	in training	11 September 2026	30 September 2026
2	DF	(Spain)	Irene Paredes	Muscular injury — left soleus		FCB X	in training	11 September 2026	23 September 2026
18	MF	(Portugal)	Kika Nazareth	Myoaponeurotic injury — right rectus femoris		FCB X	in training	22 September 2026	18 October 2026
19	MF	(Spain)	Vicky López	Myofibrillar injury — right rectus femoris		FCB X	in training	22 September 2026	
2	DF	(Spain)	Irene Paredes	Myofibrillar biceps injury — left leg		FCB X	in training	27 October 2026	12 November 2026
18	MF	(Portugal)	Kika Nazareth	Myofibrillar thigh injury — right leg		FCB X	in training	31 October 2026	
7	FW	(Brazil)	Kerolin	Myofibrillar injury — right foot		FCB X	in training	9 November 2026	

- Player is injured
- Player has recovered from injury
Last updated: 12 November 2026
Source: FC Barcelona

== Awards ==
Name	Position	Award	Ref.
(Spain) Cata Coll	Goalkeeper	Premi Barça Jugadors 2025–26	
(Spain) Rosalía Domínguez	Midfielder	FIFA U-20 Women's World Cup Golden Ball	
(Spain) Clàudia Pina	Forward	Liga F Player of the Month – September	
(Spain) Patri Guijarro	Midfielder	Trofeo Aldo Rovira 2025–26	
(Spain) Vicky López	Midfielder	Kopa Trophy (2026)	
(Spain) Pere Romeu	Head coach	Johan Cruyff Trophy (2026)	
(Spain) Cata Coll	Goalkeeper	Yashin Trophy (2026)	
FC Barcelona		Club of the Year (France Football) (2026)	
(Spain) Alexia Putellas	Midfielder	Ballon d'Or Féminin (2026)	
(Spain) Clàudia Pina	Forward	FIFPRO World 11 – Women's World XI 2026	
(Spain) Aitana Bonmatí	Midfielder	FIFPRO World 11 – Women's World XI 2026	
(Spain) Irene Paredes	Defender	FIFPRO World 11 – Women's World XI 2026	
(Spain) Alexia Putellas	Midfielder	FIFPRO World 11 – Women's World XI 2026	
(Spain) Mapi León	Defender	FIFPRO World 11 – Women's World XI 2026	
(Italy) Giulia Galli	Forward	Best Italian Golden Girl (2026)	
