= CSW =

CSW may refer to:

== Entertainment ==
- Central States Wrestling, an American wrestling promotion (1948–1989)
- Collins Scrabble Words, a word list for the board game Scrabble

== Occupations ==
- Clinical social worker, a credential
- Commercial sex worker
- Communication Support Worker, to assist deaf students

== Organisations ==
=== Schools in the United States ===
- The Cambridge School of Weston, Massachusetts (founded 1886)
- Charter School of Wilmington, Delaware (founded 1996)
- College of the Southwest, Hobbs, New Mexico (so named 1962–2008)

=== Other organisations ===
- Central and South West Corporation, an American public utility (until 2000)
- Christian Solidarity Worldwide, a British human rights charity (founded 1977)
- Combinatie Sportclub Wilnis, a Dutch football club (formed 1946)
- United Nations Commission on the Status of Women, an intergovernmental advisory board (formed 1946)

== Places ==
- Cashew MRT station, Singapore
- Cheung Sha Wan, Hong Kong
  - Cheung Sha Wan station

== Science and technology ==
- Catalog Service for the Web, a geospatial XML standard
- Cerebral salt-wasting syndrome, a rare endocrine disorder
- Craig Steven Wright (born 1970), Australian computer scientist

== Other uses ==
- Credit spread widening, in finance, a deterioration in credit quality
- Crew-served weapon, a type of military weapon system
