= Patricia Guijarro =

Spanish footballer (born 1998)

Patri Guijarro
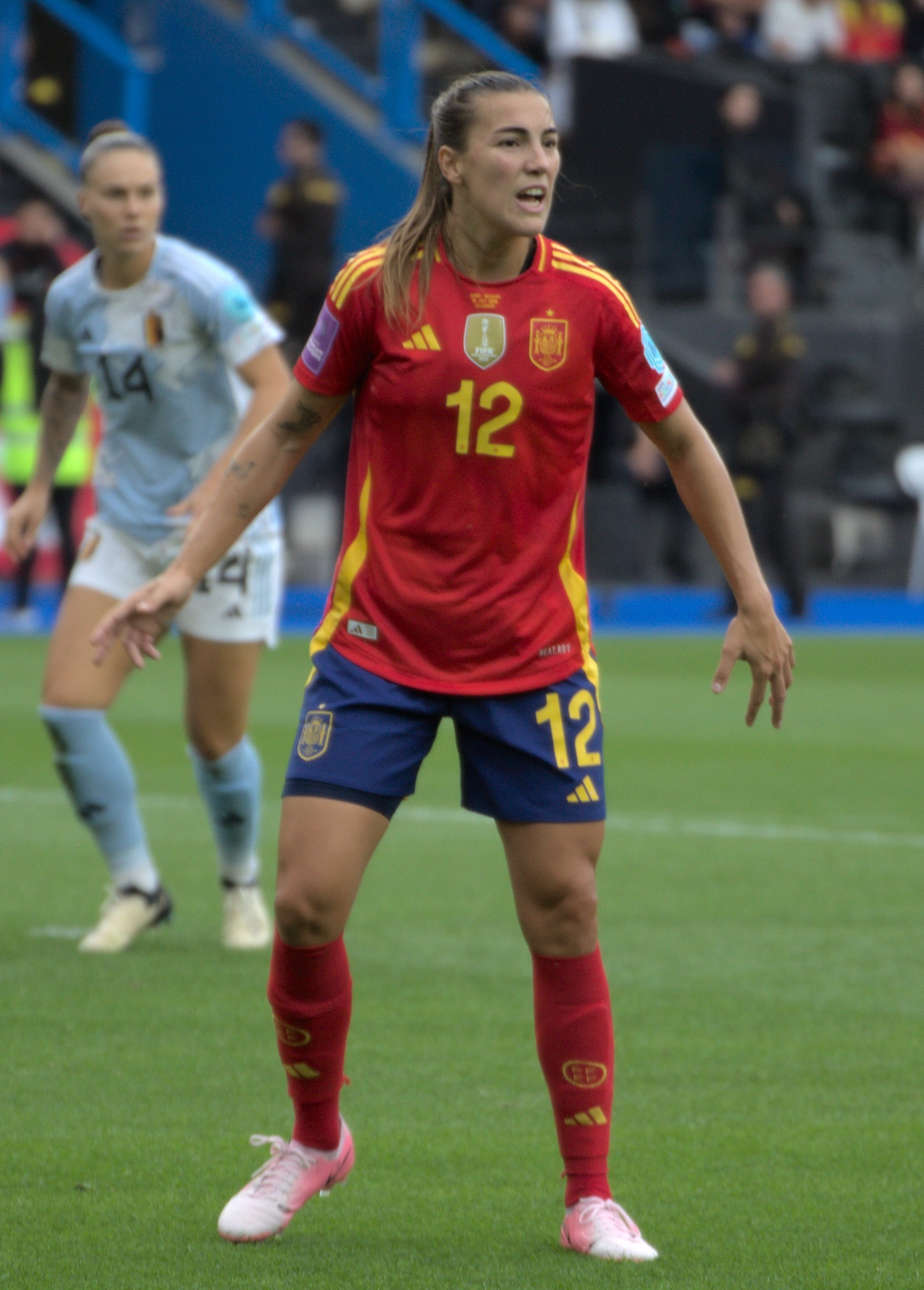
- Guijarro with Spain in 2024

Personal information
- Full name: Patricia Guijarro Gutiérrez
- Date of birth: 17 May 1998 (age 28)
- Place of birth: Palma de Mallorca, Spain
- Position: Midfielder

Team information
- Current team: Barcelona
- Number: 12

Youth career
- Collerense

Senior career*
Years	Team	Apps	(Gls)
2012–2013	Collerense B		
2013–2015	Collerense	51	(7)
2015–	Barcelona	253	(54)

International career^{‡}
2013–2015	Spain U17	26	(10)
2015–2017	Spain U19	19	(6)
2016–2018	Spain U20	10	(7)
2017–	Spain	80	(15)
Medal record
Women's football
Representing Spain
UEFA Women's Championship
Runner-up	2025 Switzerland
FIFA U-20 Women's World Cup
Runner-up	2018 France
UEFA Women's Under-19 Championship
Winner	2017 Northern Ireland
Runner-up	2016 Slovakia
UEFA Women's Under-17 Championship
Winner	2015 Iceland
- * Club domestic league appearances and goals as of 10:21, 17 October 2026 (UTC) ‡ National team caps and goals as of 16:33, 10 October 2026 (UTC)

Patricia Guijarro Gutiérrez (born 17 May 1998) is a Spanish professional footballer who primarily plays as a holding or central midfielder for Liga F club Barcelona which she captains and the Spain national team. Mostly deployed as a "number six", she is widely recognised as one of the best deep-lying playmakers in football.

Guijarro has played a major role in Spain's most recent youth national team success, making important contributions to their under-17, under-19, and under-20 teams. Most notably, she received the Golden Ball and Golden Boot at the 2018 U-20 World Cup as Spain finished second. Additionally, after her transfer to FC Barcelona Femení from UD Collerense in 2015, she has found both domestic success and European success with the club. Patri was part of the Barcelona squad that reached their first Champions League final in 2019, as well as being integral part of the Barcelona side that won the 2020–21 UEFA Champions League. She scored two goals in the 2023 Champions League final as she won her second Champions League title with Barcelona. Her performances for Spain's youth teams, senior side and Barcelona have made her widely considered one of the best midfielders in the world.

== Early life ==
Patricia Guijarro was born on 17 May 1998, in Palma, the capital city of the island of Mallorca. She recounts being born into a "football family" and shared an interest in the sport with her parents since a young age. She started playing football at age seven under her father's influence. The first club she played for was hometown club CF Patronato.

== Club career ==
=== Collerense ===
At fourteen years old, Guijarro was called up to play with the youth levels of the UD Collerense squad after she was no longer allowed to play with boys.

She was promoted to Collerense's first team at just fifteen years old. In a match against Barcelona, she caught the attention of then Barcelona coach Xavi Llorens who moved to sign her the following summer.

=== Barcelona ===
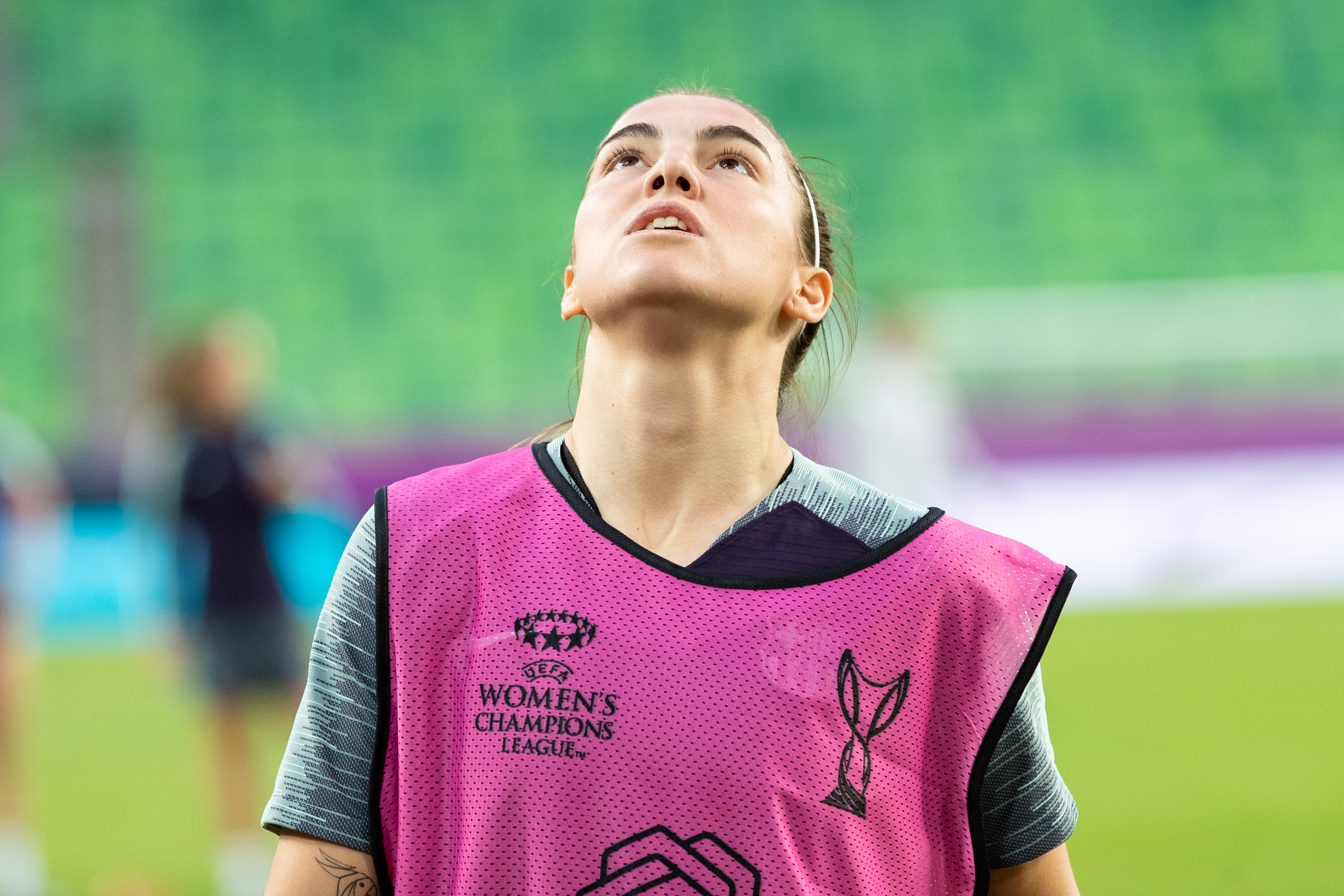
Guijarro warming up with Barcelona before the 2019 UEFA Women's Champions League final

Patri's transfer from Collerense to FC Barcelona was finalised in June 2015 with a three-year deal. She made her debut for the Blaugrana aged 17 in the 2015–16 season.

At the start of the 2017–18 season, she scored in a 3–0 Copa Catalunya victory against Espanyol, earning her third Copa Catalunya trophy. In the semi-final of the 2017–18 Champions League, Patri scored her first ever UWCL goal away at Lyon that helped keep Barcelona in the tie. In the home leg, however, Barcelona were the victims of a Eugénie Le Sommer strike that Guijarro nearly knocked off the goal-line, and exited in the quarter-finals to the eventual tournament winners. She played in each of Barcelona's matches in the 2018 Copa de la Reina, including the semi-final that went to penalties. Patri successfully converted her penalty as Barcelona advanced to their seventh Copa de la Reina final. She started the final against Atlético Madrid that went to extra time and was rescued by a Mariona Caldentey goal in the 122nd minute that won her her second Copa de la Reina title.

For a large portion of the 2018–19 season, Guijarro was sidelined with a ganglion cyst injury on her right foot that lasted almost 5 months and required two operations. She was discharged from injury hours before the 2019 Champions League Final, but did not feature in Barcelona's 4–1 loss to Lyon later that day.

At the start of the 2019–20 season, Patri was given a captaincy role for the first time by becoming the team's fifth-choice captain. In February 2020, she played in the first edition of the Supercopa de España Femenina, and was the first Barcelona player to score in the semi-finals against Atlético Madrid with a volley from outside the box. Guijarro started the final against Real Sociedad, a huge 10–1 win that earned Barça and Patri their first ever Supercopa de España Femenina trophy.

In the first game of Barcelona's 2020–21 league season, Patri scored the opening goal in a match against Real Madrid Femenino to make her the first goalscorer in the Women's Clásico. Later that same season, Guijarro started the 2021 Champions League Final on 16 May 2021, where she had to play out of position as a right-sided centre-back due to regular central defensive starter Andrea Pereira being suspended for the final. A day before her 23rd birthday, Patri played all 90 minutes as Barça destroyed Chelsea 4–0 in the final to win their first-ever Champions League (UWCL) trophy and to become the first Spanish women's side to complete the treble.

Following the departure of first-captain Vicky Losada, Guijarro stepped into the fourth-captaincy role ahead of the 2021–22 season. In the 2022–23 campaign, Patri made 40 appearances as Barcelona retained the Spanish title once more and she was instrumental to their Champions League triumph. With Barça 2–0 down to Wolfsburg in the final, Guijarro scored twice in the first five minutes of the second half to spark a dramatic 3–2 comeback victory for the Blaugrana, culminating with Fridolina Rolfö's 70th-minute winner. After this impressive performance, Patri was named the UWCL final Player of the Match.

On 6 October 2023, Patri extended her contract at Barcelona until June 2027. Having developed into a world-class deep-lying midfielder, Guijarro received a 2023 Ballon d'Or nomination, where she placed eighth in the final ranking.

One of five Barcelona players given a perfect rating for their perfect 2023–24 season, Patri started the most games as captain for the team and progressed in her leadership capabilities. Guijarro continued playing as a central midfielder, where her high-quality passing meant the team's play typically went through her and her positional sense allowed the likes of Aitana Bonmatí, Alexia Putellas, Mariona and Clàudia Pina to shine in advanced attacking areas. The 2023–24 campaign saw Barça become the first Spanish women's team to complete a continental quadruple.

The consistent Guijarro began to receive regular worldwide acclaim. Not only did she come 11th in the ranking for the 2024 Ballon d'Or, but she was also included in The Best FIFA Women's World XIs for both 2024 and 2025. her form for club and country earned her yet another Ballon d'Or nomination in 2025, where she achieved her best-ever ranking of sixth position.

On 21 September 2025, Patri crowned her 350th match for Barcelona by assisting a goal for Vicky López, which was the third goal of a 5–0 away win at Sevilla. On 16 October, Barça confirmed that Guijarro had suffered a stress fracture in the navicular bone and was set to be injured for around three months.

Patri is seen as an all-time Barça great, having played over 350 times for the club and scored over 60 goals (as of the 2024–25 season). She has been incredibly successful, winning seven Spanish league (Liga F) titles, four Champions Leagues, eight Copas de la Reina and six Supercopa de España Femenina trophies.

== International career ==
=== Youth ===
Guijarro has had extensive individual and team success at the youth level.

Spain U17

Guijarro's first international youth tournament experience came when she was fifteen, with a callup to play for Spain at the 2013 UEFA Under-17 European Championship. She played all 90 minutes of Spain's two matches in the finals. The first finals match against Sweden went to penalties, and despite her penalty conversion, Spain lost the shootout 4–5. They got some compensation, however, by defeating Belgium 4–0 in the next match. Guijarro scored Spain's third goal of the match as they bowed out as third-place finishers.

Months later, in November, Guijarro was part of the Spain team at 2014 UEFA Under-17 European Championship. She kicked off her tournament with a win against then-World champions France by scoring a goal from a corner to make the score 2–0. A 4–0 thrashing of Germany put them at the top of their group and found them playing England in the semi-finals, a match they won 2–0. She drew first blood in the final against Germany, scoring in the ninth minute with a shot from outside the area. Germany found a goal later in the match, and it stayed tied through extra time, ending up in penalties. She scored Spain's first and only penalty as Germany exacted revenge for their group stage loss by defeating them 3–1 in the shootout.

In April of the following year, she participated in the 2014 U-17 World Cup. Guijarro's two tournament goals came in a quarter-final brace against Nigeria, one of which was a penalty and the other a close-range shot from a loose ball. She earned player of the match as Spain moved onto the semi-finals. Spain went on to win the semifinal tie against Italy to reach their first U17 World Cup final, but were defeated by 2–0 Japan as Spain recorded a runner-up finish in consecutive U17 tournaments.

The 2015 UEFA Under-17 European Championship was her final tournament as a U17 player. After two group stage wins and a draw, Spain finished above Germany, and they met France yet again in the knockout round. For the third time in a row at U17 UEFA tournaments, Spain faced a penalty shootout. Unlike the other times, however, they were successful, with Spain's only miss out of the five attempts coming from Guijarro, who hit the post. She started the final where Spain found themselves winning 5–2 against Switzerland, her first ever international title. She was selected again for the Team of the Tournament.

Spain U19

At the 2016 UEFA Under-19 European Championship, she played every minute of the group stage wins against Germany and Austria as Spain swept Group B and moved on to win 4–3 against Netherlands in the semi-final. Against France in the final, Spain had plenty of attempts on goal, and in a last-gasp effort to secure a comeback, she missed a shot from a corner service which was parried out after two more Spain shots. Spain came runner-up as Guijarro played every minute of every match she featured in and was named to the team of the tournament.

Spain's first match of the 2017 UEFA Under-19 European Championship was a win against Northern Ireland. Guijarro's first tournament goal came in the 53rd minute as a volley from distance. Following a loss against Germany, Spain was to play Scotland who had 3 points and 1 point, respectively, meaning whoever won the match moved onto the next round and automatically qualified for the 2018 U-20 World Cup. She scored the game winner and her second tournament goal in that match, allowing Spain to finish second in the table with 6 points as they moved onto the knockouts.

In the semi-finals against the Netherlands, she sent in an assist for Maite Oroz that put Spain up 2–1. Guijarro scored the game winning third goal in the 77th minute, securing Spain's trip to their fourth consecutive U19 EURO final even after they would concede again in the 85th. In the final of the tournament, she responded to France's opening goal with a volley in the box serviced from a corner. As the match advanced, the scoreline went to 2–2 until the 89th minute when she scored her third match-winner of the tournament with a headed goal off of a Carmen Menayo free-kick. With that goal, Spain ended their streak of three consecutive finals defeats at the U19 EUROs and won their first U19 EURO title since 2004. She was given the Golden Ball as the tournament's best player, the Golden Boot as the tournament's highest scorer, and named to the Team of the Tournament.

Spain U20

Spain had a relatively unsuccessful run at the 2016 U-20 World Cup. Guijarro's first and only tournament goal came in a 5–0 win against Canada, in which she also assisted a Lucía García stoppage time strike. She then started in a win against Japan and was rested for a loss against Nigeria. At the end of the group stage, Spain sat at second in the table, advancing them to the knockouts. They bowed out in a 3–2 loss against North Korea in the quarter-finals.

Guijarro was named vice captain for the 2018 U-20 World Cup. She started the tournament by scoring a hat-trick against Paraguay in the first match of the group stage. She went on to score again in the group stage against the United States in a match that ended a 2–2 draw, effectively knocking out the United States in the group stages for the first time ever in a U20 tournament.

In the quarter-finals, Spain faced Group D runner-ups Nigeria, and Guijarro scored yet another match-winner just before halftime. With her match winner, Spain reached the semi-finals of a U-20 World Cup for the first time ever. Spain met the previous tournament's runner-up, France, in the next round. She headed in her sixth goal of the tournament in the semifinal matchup, which had her leading in the Golden Boot race. Her goal was the only goal of the tie and Spain advanced to their first U-20 Women's World Cup final with a 1–0 win. Spain lost their captain Aitana Bonmatí through suspension against France, so Guijarro started with the captain's band for the final against Japan. Despite many attempts on goal, she was kept scoreless in the final against Japan as Spain fell 1–3.

Before the final, England forward Georgia Stanway tied her six-goal tally in the third-place match against France. They both ended their tournaments with six goals and she shared top scorer honours with Stanway, but Guijarro earned the Golden Boot by registering an additional three assists. She was also awarded the Golden Ball and was named to the Team of the Tournament. The tournament was her final youth international experience as she transitioned to a full senior international between 2018 and 2019. As of 2019, she remains Spain's highest scorer with the U-20 team with seven goals.

=== Senior ===
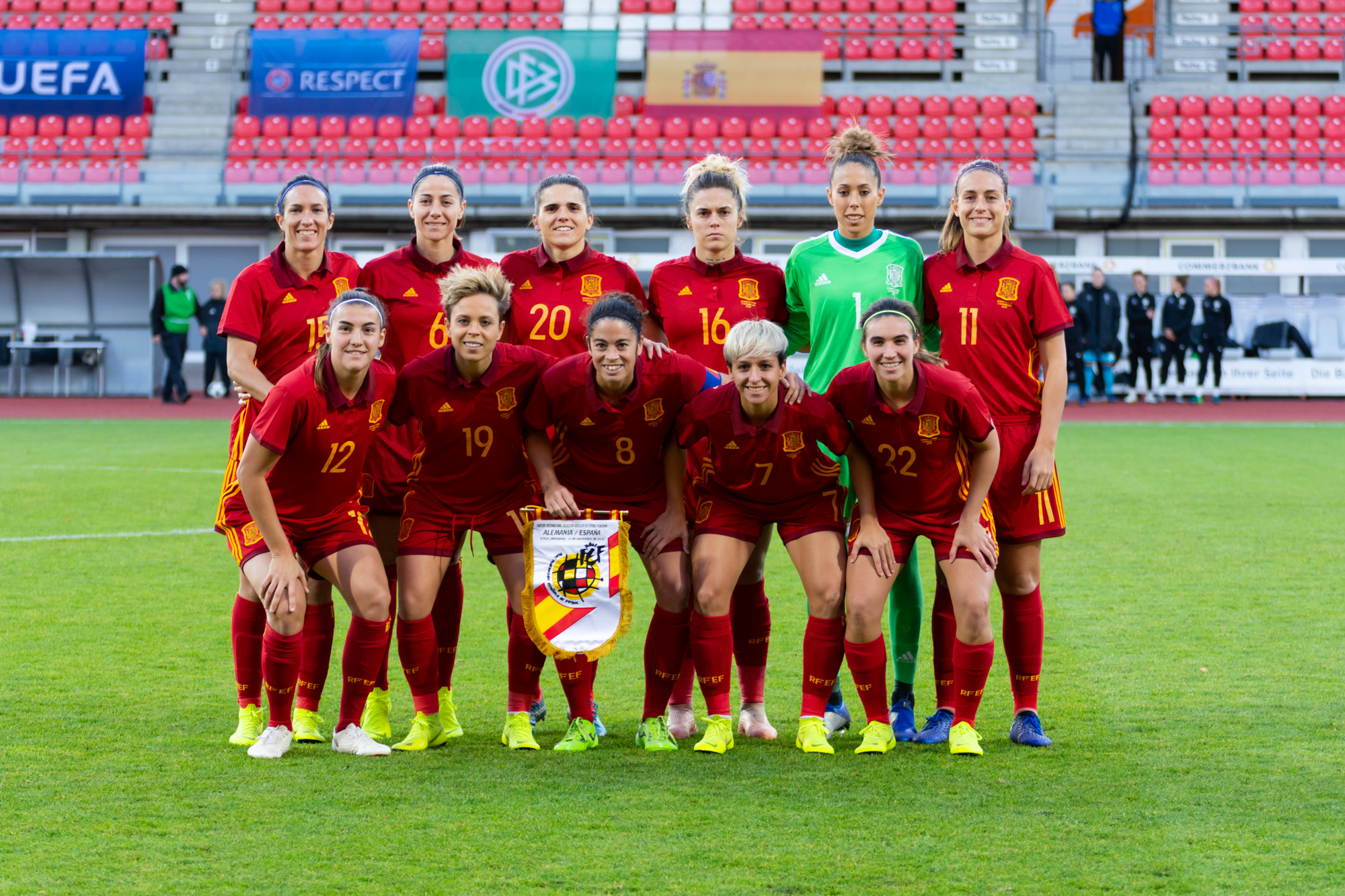
Guijarro (second row, left) lining up with Spain national team in 2018

Her first senior national team cap and start came in a goalless draw against Iceland at the 2017 Algarve Cup. This was the final match of the group stages, and their point and goal difference put them in the first place match against Canada. She subbed on for Mapi León late in the match to help maintain a 1–0 lead. This victory earned Guijarro and Spain their first ever senior international title.

Patri played every match for Spain in the 2019 World Cup qualifiers where she scored two goals. Her first senior international goal was a 91st minute match-winner that came in a qualifying match against Serbia, keeping them on top of the qualification group. Her second international goal came against Austria four days later in a 4–0 win. Spain won all of their qualifying matches and were the first European team to qualify for the tournament other than the hosts France.

By 2018, Guijarro had established herself as a regular starter with the Spain national team. At the 2018 Cyprus Cup, she played in two of Spain's group stage matches- two wins against Austria and the Czech Republic. Seven points and a +3 goal difference at the end of the group stage meant Spain were to face Italy in the final of the tournament. In the 80th minute of the final, Patri connected with service from a corner to send in Spain's second goal. Spain's 2–0 win was Spain's first Cyprus Cup title and Guijarro's second title with Spain's senior team.

Patri was called to Spain's 2019 World Cup squad days after being discharged from a long-term injury on her right foot. She sat out the first match against South Africa as a precaution for her recently healed injury. The midfielder made her World Cup debut in the next match, a group stage clash against European powerhouse Germany, subbing on in the 65th minute for Silvia Meseguer. She then started and played all 90 minutes of Spain's next two matches- a draw in the final group stage match against China and Spain's first ever knockout match of a World Cup against the United States. Spain and Guijarro fell in the Round of 16 to the eventual tournament winners despite producing a hard-fought performance.

Guijarro was included in Spain's squad for the Euro 2022 held in England. She started all four of her nation's matches at the competition. Spain were knocked out by hosts and eventual winners England in the quarter-finals following a 2-1 loss after extra time.

Patri was one of Las 15, a group of players who made themselves unavailable for international selection in September 2022 due to their dissatisfaction with head coach Jorge Vilda, and among the dozen who were not involved 11 months later as Spain won the World Cup.

On 10 June 2025, Guijarro was called up to the Spain squad for the Euro 2025. In the final group stage match, she scored in a 3-1 win over Italy. A key player at the base of the Spanish midfield, Patri started all six of their games and produced controlling midfield performances as La Roja reached the final. On 27 July, she started in the Euro 2025 final and was the only Spanish player to score in the penalty shootout as Spain lost to England 3–1 on penalties after a 1–1 draw.

As of December 2025, Patri is Spain's eighth most-capped player of all-time with over 70 international appearances.

== Style of play ==
Guijarro was described by FIFA in 2018 as a box-to-box midfielder who is able to be a creative presence at every stage of an attacking play; Guijarro considers herself an offensive player, saying she has been deployed in both defensive and forward midfield roles for Spain and Barcelona. She felt she was used more defensively at Barcelona than with Spain. In 2018, club and country teammate Aitana Bonmatí also felt that Guijarro helped the team "by making runs into the box". By 2023, Guijarro was considered a deep-lying playmaker at Barcelona.

She is a physical presence on the pitch, and has spatial awareness to anticipate defensive and attacking situations. Barcelona's midfield operates with passing play, and Guijarro's passing range is typically short, tight, passes that keep the ball moving and allow her to facilitate link-up play. In the deeper areas of the pitch, Guijarro plays horizontal passes, different to her deep-lying Barcelona midfield teammates Keira Walsh and Ingrid Syrstad Engen, keeping momentum in possession with her teammates and accelerating forward off the ball. Using her speed and physicality to break past markers, Guijarro is able to finish moves she starts and contribute in attack. Higher up the pitch she advances the ball and can also provide crosses into the box. If she stays back instead, her defensive awareness allows other midfielders to press in advanced areas; her midfield defensive work is characterised by ball-winning duels.

== Personal life ==
Patri's idol is former Spain teammate and fellow Balearic Islands native Virginia Torrecilla. She has also cited Andrés Iniesta as an idol.

She was the first girl at La Masia to complete the Baccalaureate and, as of 2018, was studying physiotherapy.

== Career statistics ==
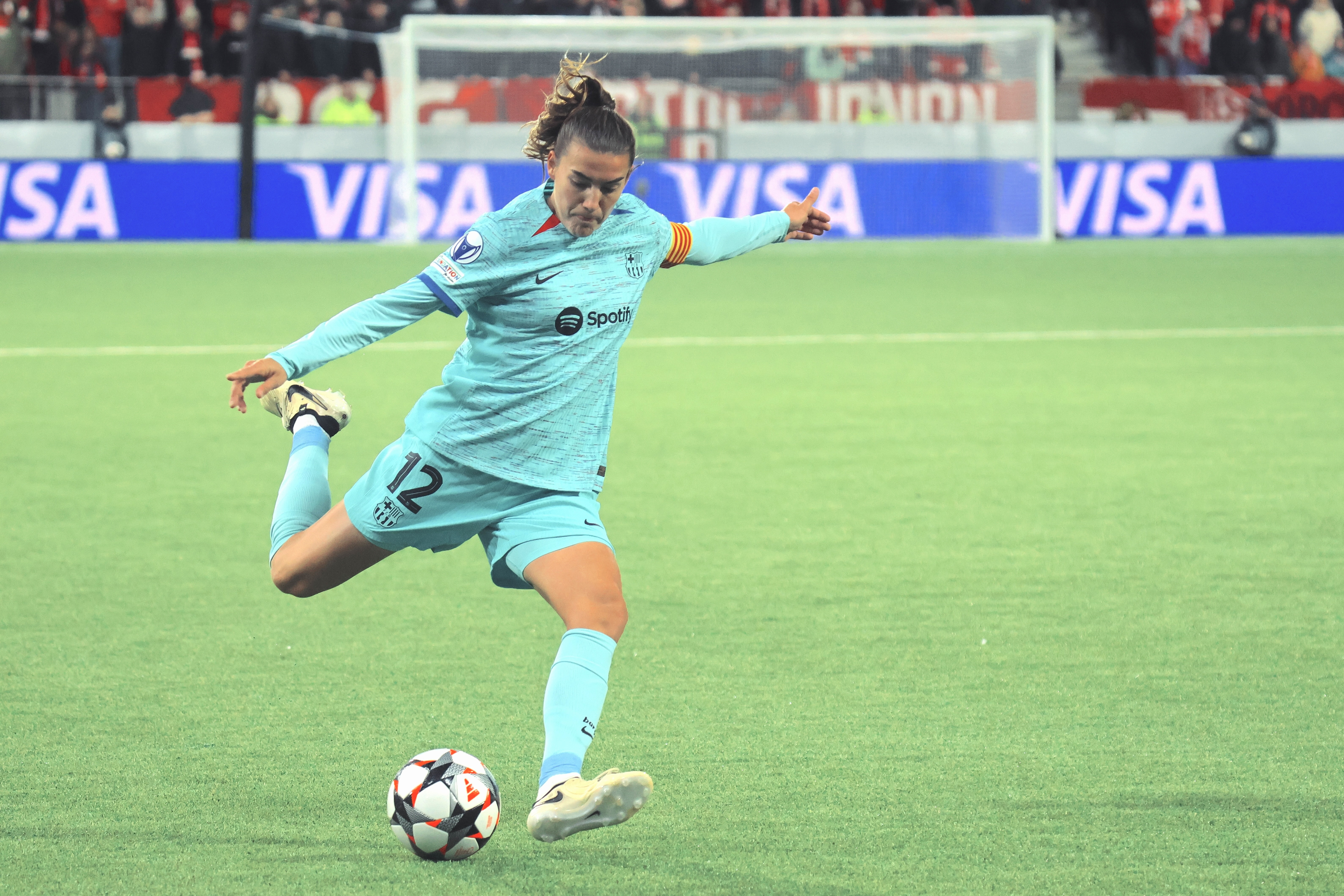
Guijarro with Barcelona in March 2024

=== Club ===
As of match played 4 October 2026

Appearances and goals by club, season and competition
Club	Season	League			Copa de la Reina		Continental		Other		Total	
Club	Season	Division	Apps	Goals	Apps	Goals	Apps	Goals	Apps	Goals	Apps	Goals
Collerense	2013–14	Primera División	22	3	—		—		—		22	3
Collerense	2014–15	Primera División	29	4	—		—		—		29	4
Collerense	Total		51	7	—		—		—		51	7
Barcelona	2015–16	Primera División	23	6	3	1	5 (Note: Appearances in UEFA Women's Champions League)	0	—		31	7
Barcelona	2016–17	Primera División	20	2	2	0	5	0	—		27	2
Barcelona	2017–18	Primera División	25	9	4	0	6	1	—		35	10
Barcelona	2018–19	Primera División	14	4	1	0	3	2	—		18	6
Barcelona	2019–20	Primera División	18	2	4	1	5	1	2 (Note: Appearances in Supercopa de España)	1	29	5
Barcelona	2020–21	Primera División	29	8	3	1	7	0	1	0	40	9
Barcelona	2021–22	Primera División	25	4	3	0	8	0	2	0	38	4
Barcelona	2022–23	Liga F	28	3	0	0	10	4	2	0	40	7
Barcelona	2023–24	Liga F	23	5	5	1	10	4	2	0	40	10
Barcelona	2024–25	Liga F	25	7	4	1	11	0	2	1	42	9
Barcelona	2025–26	Liga F	17	3	4	0	7	0	2	0	30	3
Barcelona	2026–27	Liga F	6	1	0	0	2	0	0	0	8	1
Barcelona	Total		253	54	33	5	79	12	13	2	378	73
Career total			304	61	33	5	79	12	13	2	429	80

=== International ===
As of match played 20 July 2022

Appearances and goals by national team and year
National team	Year	Apps	Goals
Spain	2017	5	2
Spain	2018	13	1
Spain	2019	9	1
Spain	2020	6	3
Spain	2021	9	3
Spain	2022	11	1
Spain	2024	12	0
Spain	2025	1	1
Total		66	12

Scores and results list Spain's goal tally first, score column indicates score after each Guijarro goal.

List of international goals scored by Patricia Guijarro
#	Date	Venue	Opponent	Score	Result	Competition
1	24 November 2017	Voždovac Stadium, Belgrade, Serbia	Serbia	2–1	2–1	2019 FIFA Women's World Cup qualification
2	28 November 2017	Estadi de Son Moix, Palma de Mallorca, Spain	Austria	2–0	4–0	2019 FIFA Women's World Cup qualification
3	7 March 2018	AEK Arena, Larnaca, Cyprus	Italy	2–0	2–0	2018 Cyprus Women's Cup
4	4 October 2019	Estadio Riazor, A Coruña, Spain	Azerbaijan	1–0	4–0	UEFA Women's Euro 2022 qualifying
5	19 September 2020	Zimbru Stadium, Chișinău, Moldova	Moldova	8–0	9–0	UEFA Women's Euro 2022 qualifying
6	23 October 2020	Estadio de La Cartuja, Seville, Spain	Czech Republic	2–0	4–0	UEFA Women's Euro 2022 qualifying
7	27 November 2020	La Ciudad del Fútbol, Las Rozas de Madrid, Spain	Moldova	8–0	10–0	UEFA Women's Euro 2022 qualifying
8	9 April 2021	Estadio Municipal de Marbella, Marbella, Spain	Netherlands	1–0	1–0	Friendly
9	15 June 2021	Estadio Municipal de Santo Domingo, Alcorcón, Spain	Denmark	2–0	3–0	Friendly
10	16 September 2021	Tórsvøllur, Tórshavn, Faroe Islands	Faroe Islands	8–0	10–0	2023 FIFA Women's World Cup qualification
11	2 September 2022	La Ciudad del Fútbol, Las Rozas de Madrid, Spain	Hungary	3–0	3–0	2023 FIFA Women's World Cup qualification
12	4 April 2025	Estádio Capital do Móvel, Paços de Ferreira, Portugal	Portugal	1–0	4–2	2025 UEFA Women's Nations League
13	11 July 2025	Stadion Wankdorf, Bern, Switzerland	Italy	2–1	3–1	UEFA Women's Euro 2025
14	5 June 2026	Estadi Mallorca Son Moix, Palma de Mallorca, Spain	England	1–0	4–0	2027 FIFA World Cup qualification
15	10 October 2026	Audi Field, Washington, D.C., United States	United States	1–0	2–0	Friendly

== Honours ==
FC Barcelona

- Primera División: 2019–20, 2020–21, 2021–22, 2022–23, 2023–24, 2024–25, 2025–26
- Copa de la Reina: 2017, 2018, 2019–20, 2020–21, 2021–22, 2023–24, 2024–25, 2025–26
- Supercopa de España Femenina: 2019–20, 2021–22, 2022–23, 2023–24, 2024–25, 2025–26
- Copa Catalunya: 2015, 2016, 2017, 2018, 2019
- UEFA Women's Champions League: 2020–21, 2022–23, 2023–24, 2025–26

Spain U17

- UEFA Women's Under-17 Championship: 2015

Spain U19

- UEFA Women's Under-19 Championship: 2017; runner-up: 2016

Spain U20

- FIFA U-20 Women's World Cup runner-up: 2018

Spain

- UEFA Women's Championship runner-up: 2025
- Algarve Cup: 2017
- Cyprus Cup: 2018

Individual

- UEFA Women's Under-17 Championship Team of the Tournament: 2015
- UEFA Women's Under-19 Championship Team of the Tournament: 2016, 2017
- UEFA Women's Under-19 Championship Golden Ball: 2017
- UEFA Women's Under-19 Championship Golden Boot: 2017
- FIFA U-20 Women's World Cup Golden Ball: 2018
- FIFA U-20 Women's World Cup Golden Boot: 2018
- UEFA Women's Championship Team of the Tournament: 2025
- UEFA Women's Champions League Squad of the Season: 2020–21, 2022–23, 2023–24, 2024–25, 2025–26
- UEFA Women's Champions League Final MVP: 2023
- Liga F Player of the Month: November 2024
- The Best FIFA Women's 11: 2024, 2025
- AFE Awards – Best Liga F player: 2025–26
- Memorial Aldo Rovira Award: 2025–26

=== Awards and recognition ===
In 2018, Guijarro made The Guardian's yearly list of the 100 best women's footballers, coming in at number 68. They described her as one of the best midfielders in the world.
