= 2027 FIFA Women's World Cup qualification – UEFA League A =

Tournament details
- Dates: 3 March – 9 June 2026
- Teams: 16

Tournament statistics
- Matches played: 48
- Goals scored: 144 (3 per match)
- Attendance: 462,189 (9,629 per match)
- Top scorer(s): (Spain) Edna Imade (5 goals)
- Women's Nations League Women's World Cup qualifying

League A of the Women's European Qualifiers will determine four of the European teams to qualify for the 2027 FIFA Women's World Cup final tournament in Brazil and twelve of the teams to advance to the play-off phase.

== Format ==
The sixteen highest-ranked teams in the 2025 UEFA Women's Nations League overall phase ranking were drawn into four groups of four teams each. Each group will be contested in a league format where each team plays each other team at home and away.

Group winners will qualify directly for the 2027 FIFA Women's World Cup, and all other teams will advance to the play-off phase. In addition, all fourth-place teams will be relegated to League B for the following 2027 UEFA Women's Nations League.

=== Schedule ===
The match schedule will be as follows:

Matchday	Date
Matchday 1	3 March 2026
Matchday 2	7 March 2026
Matchday 3	14 April 2026
Matchday 4	18 April 2026
Matchday 5	5 June 2026
Matchday 6	9 June 2026

== Seeding ==
Teams were allocated to League A according to the 2025 Women's Nations League overall phase rankings and were seeded into four pots of four teams. The draw for the league phase took place on 4 November 2025 at 13:00 CET.

Pot 1
Team	Rank
France	1
Germany	2
Spain	3
Sweden	4

Pot 2
Team	Rank
Netherlands	5
England	6
Italy	7
Norway	8

Pot 3
Team	Rank
Denmark (Note: Austria, Denmark, Iceland, and Republic of Ireland participated in the League A vs League B promotion/relegation matches in October 2025 to determine each team's league allocation.)	9
Austria	10
Iceland	11
Poland	12

Pot 4
Team	Rank
Slovenia	13
Serbia	14
Ukraine	15
Republic of Ireland	16

== Groups ==
The fixture list was confirmed by UEFA following the draw. Times are CET/CEST, (Note: CET (UTC+1) for matches until 29 March 2026 (matchdays 1–2), and CEST (UTC+2) for matches thereafter (matchdays 3–6).) as listed by UEFA (local times, if different, are in parentheses).

=== Group A1 ===
Pos	Team	Pld	W	D	L	GF	GA	GD	Pts	Qualification or relegation	(Denmark)	(Italy)	(Sweden)	(Serbia)
1	Denmark	6	4	2	0	12	5	+7	14	Qualification to 2027 FIFA Women's World Cup	—	0–0	2–1	3–1
2	Italy	6	2	3	1	12	4	+8	9	Advance to play-offs	1–1	—	0–1	3–0
3	Sweden	6	2	2	2	6	6	0	8	Advance to play-offs	1–2	2–2	—	1–0
4	Serbia (R)	6	0	1	5	2	17	−15	1	Advance to play-offs and relegation to League B	1–4	0–6	0–0	—

Source: UEFA
Rules for classification: Tiebreakers
(R) Relegated
3 March 2026
18:00

Denmark	3–1	Serbia
Bredgaard 13'; Vangsgaard 19'; Harder 64' (pen.)	Report (FIFA); Report (UEFA)	Stokić 40'

Forum Horsens Stadium, Horsens
Attendance: 2,814
Referee: Abigail Byrne (England)
3 March 2026
18:15

Italy	0–1	Sweden
	Report (FIFA); Report (UEFA)	Angeldahl 22'

Stadio Oreste Granillo, Reggio Calabria
Attendance: 6,008
Referee: Olatz Rivera Olmedo (Spain)

7 March 2026
16:00

Serbia	0–0	Sweden
	Report (FIFA); Report (UEFA)

Serbian FA Sports Center, Stara Pazova
Attendance: 412
Referee: Fabienne Michel (Germany)
7 March 2026
18:15

Italy	1–1	Denmark
Piemonte 19'	Report (FIFA); Report (UEFA)	Holdt 63'

Stadio Romeo Menti, Vicenza
Attendance: 5,278
Referee: Désirée Blanco (Switzerland)

14 April 2026
18:15

Serbia	0–6	Italy
	Report (FIFA); Report (UEFA)	Girelli 20'; Oliviero 36'; Lenzini 45'; Caruso 61'; Cantore 88'; Greggi 90+4'

Dubočica Stadium, Leskovac
Attendance: 686
Referee: Eleni Antoniou (Greece)
14 April 2026
19:00

Sweden	1–2	Denmark
Jusu Bah 8'	Report (FIFA); Report (UEFA)	Harder 30'; Thomsen 90+2'

Gamla Ullevi, Gothenburg
Attendance: 12,573
Referee: Ivana Martinčić (Croatia)

18 April 2026
15:00

Denmark	0–0	Italy
	Report (FIFA); Report (UEFA)

Parken Stadium, Copenhagen
Attendance: 12,013
Referee: Emanuela Rusta (Albania)
18 April 2026
16:00

Sweden	1–0	Serbia
Blackstenius 50'	Report (FIFA); Report (UEFA)

Nationalarenan, Solna
Attendance: 20,097
Referee: Désirée Blanco (Switzerland)

5 June 2026
18:15

Italy	3–0	Serbia
Bergamaschi 61'; Caruso 81'; Bonansea 88'	Report (FIFA); Report (UEFA)

Arena Garibaldi, Pisa
Attendance: 3,216
Referee: Lina Lehtovaara (Finland)
5 June 2026
19:15

Denmark	2–1	Sweden
Fløe 25'; Harder 65'	Report (FIFA); Report (UEFA)	Rytting Kaneryd 52'

Odense Stadium, Odense
Attendance: 5,902
Referee: Stéphanie Frappart (France)

9 June 2026
19:00

Sweden	2–2	Italy
Lundkvist 70'; Rolfö 73'	Report (FIFA); Report (UEFA)	Oliviero 36'; Piemonte 45'

Gamla Ullevi, Gothenburg
Attendance: 12,816
Referee: Iuliana Demetrescu (Romania)
9 June 2026
19:00

Serbia	1–4	Denmark
Poljak 15'	Report (FIFA); Report (UEFA)	Fløe 8'; Vangsgaard 14', 42'; Harder 40' (pen.)

Serbian FA Sports Center, Stara Pazova
Attendance: 280
Referee: Rasa Grigonė (Lithuania)

=== Group A2 ===
Pos	Team	Pld	W	D	L	GF	GA	GD	Pts	Qualification or relegation	(France)	(Netherlands)	(Republic of Ireland)	(Poland)
1	France	6	4	1	1	11	5	+6	13	Qualification to 2027 FIFA Women's World Cup	—	1–1	1–0	4–1
2	Netherlands	6	3	2	1	12	9	+3	11	Advance to play-offs	2–1	—	2–1	3–1
3	Republic of Ireland	6	3	0	3	9	9	0	9	Advance to play-offs	1–2	3–2	—	1–0
4	Poland (R)	6	0	1	5	6	15	−9	1	Advance to play-offs and relegation to League B	0–2	2–2	2–3	—

Source: UEFA
Rules for classification: Tiebreakers
(R) Relegated
3 March 2026
18:00

Poland	2–2	Netherlands
Pajor 24'; Tomasiak 84'	Report (FIFA); Report (UEFA)	Buurman 44'; Roord 47'

Gdańsk Stadium, Gdańsk
Attendance: 3,540
Referee: Ivana Projkovska (North Macedonia)
3 March 2026
19:30 (18:30 UTC)

Republic of Ireland	1–2	France
McCabe 12'	Report (FIFA); Report (UEFA)	Malard 71', 79'

Tallaght Stadium, Dublin
Attendance: 8,376
Referee: Tess Olofsson (Sweden)

7 March 2026
20:45

Netherlands	2–1	Republic of Ireland
Beerensteyn 20', 82'	Report (FIFA); Report (UEFA)	McCabe 50' (pen.)

Stadion Galgenwaard, Utrecht
Attendance: 12,244
Referee: Frida Klarlund (Denmark)
7 March 2026
21:10

France	4–1	Poland
Katoto 20', 40'; Karchaoui 59' (pen.); Diani 71'	Report (FIFA); Report (UEFA)	Pajor 29'

Stade Gaston Gérard, Dijon
Attendance: 8,707
Referee: Alina Peşu (Romania)

14 April 2026
18:00

Poland	2–3	Republic of Ireland
Pawollek 43'; Pajor 78'	Report (FIFA); Report (UEFA)	Murphy 12'; McCabe 20'; Sheva 59'

Gdańsk Stadium, Gdańsk
Attendance: 4,270
Referee: Hristiyana Guteva (Bulgaria)
14 April 2026
20:45

Netherlands	2–1	France
van Asten 11'; Brugts 68'	Report (FIFA); Report (UEFA)	Baltimore 54'

Rat Verlegh Stadion, Breda
Attendance: 6,503
Referee: Marta Huerta De Aza (Spain)

18 April 2026
16:00 (15:00 UTC+1)

Republic of Ireland	1–0	Poland
Sheva 42'	Report (FIFA); Report (UEFA)

Aviva Stadium, Dublin
Attendance: 18,267
Referee: Aleksandra Česen (Slovenia)
18 April 2026
21:10

France	1–1	Netherlands
Katoto 45+1'	Report (FIFA); Report (UEFA)	Kaptein 76'

Stade de l'Abbé-Deschamps, Auxerre
Attendance: 8,334
Referee: Maria Sole Ferrieri Caputi (Italy)

5 June 2026
18:30

Poland	0–2	France
	Report (FIFA); Report (UEFA)	Malard 47'; Baltimore 63'

Gdańsk Stadium, Gdańsk
Attendance: 11,713
Referee: Kirsty Dowle (England)
5 June 2026
20:30 (19:30 UTC+1)

Republic of Ireland	3–2	Netherlands
Carusa 19'; Larkin 71'; Barrett 90'	Report (FIFA); Report (UEFA)	Janssen 70' (pen.); Pelova 81'

Páirc Uí Chaoimh, Cork
Attendance: 12,569
Referee: Katalin Kulcsár (Hungary)

9 June 2026
21:00

France	1–0	Republic of Ireland
Malard 40'	Report (FIFA); Report (UEFA)

Stade des Alpes, Grenoble
Attendance: 7,559
Referee: Désirée Blanco (Switzerland)
9 June 2026
21:00

Netherlands	3–1	Poland
Kaptein 24'; Leuchter 61'; Rijsbergen 81'	Report (FIFA); Report (UEFA)	Kamczyk 83' (pen.)

Asito Stadion, Almelo
Attendance: 8,021
Referee: Fabienne Michel (Germany)

=== Group A3 ===
Pos	Team	Pld	W	D	L	GF	GA	GD	Pts	Qualification or relegation	(Spain)	(England)	(Iceland)	(Ukraine)
1	Spain	6	5	0	1	21	3	+18	15	Qualification to 2027 FIFA Women's World Cup	—	4–0	3–0	5–0
2	England	6	5	0	1	13	5	+8	15	Advance to play-offs	1–0	—	2–0	3–0
3	Iceland	6	2	0	4	3	12	−9	6	Advance to play-offs	1–6	0–1	—	1–0
4	Ukraine (R)	6	0	0	6	2	19	−17	0	Advance to play-offs and relegation to League B	1–3	1–6	0–1	—

Source: UEFA
Rules for classification: Tiebreakers
(R) Relegated
3 March 2026
18:00 (20:00 UTC+3)

Ukraine	1–6	England
Kalinina 58'	Report (FIFA); Report (UEFA)	Russo 47', 51'; Stanway 64' (pen.), 70'; Park 78', 89'

Mardan Sports Complex, Antalya (Turkey) (Note: Due to the Russian invasion of Ukraine, Ukraine are required to play their home matches at neutral venues until further notice.)
Attendance: 275
Referee: Catarina Campos (Portugal)
3 March 2026
19:00

Spain	3–0	Iceland
Pina 39', 54'; Imade 76'	Report (FIFA); Report (UEFA)

Estadio Municipal de Castalia, Castellón de la Plana
Attendance: 7,586
Referee: Emanuela Rusta (Albania)

7 March 2026
13:30 (12:30 UTC)

England	2–0	Iceland
Bronze 22'; Stanway 78'	Report (FIFA); Report (UEFA)

City Ground, Nottingham
Attendance: 27,474
Referee: Silvia Gasperotti (Italy)
7 March 2026
18:00 (20:00 UTC+3)

Ukraine	1–3	Spain
Ovdiychuk 76'	Report (FIFA); Report (UEFA)	Imade 44'; L. Corrales 45+3'; López 55' (pen.)

Mardan Sports Complex, Antalya (Turkey)
Attendance: 264
Referee: Maïka Vanderstichel (France)

14 April 2026
20:00 (19:00 UTC+1)

England	1–0	Spain
Hemp 3'	Report (FIFA); Report (UEFA)

Wembley Stadium, London
Attendance: 62,306
Referee: Tess Olofsson (Sweden)
14 April 2026
20:30 (18:30 UTC)

Iceland	1–0	Ukraine
Jóhannsdóttir 47'	Report (FIFA); Report (UEFA)

Laugardalsvöllur, Reykjavík
Attendance: 1,453
Referee: Shona Shukrula (Netherlands)

18 April 2026
16:00

Spain	5–0	Ukraine
Imade 2', 47'; Méndez 61'; Navarro 71'; López 76'	Report (FIFA); Report (UEFA)

Estadio Nuevo Arcángel, Córdoba
Attendance: 10,768
Referee: Fabienne Michel (Germany)
18 April 2026
18:30 (16:30 UTC)

Iceland	0–1	England
	Report (FIFA); Report (UEFA)	Russo 21'

Laugardalsvöllur, Reykjavík
Attendance: 4,100
Referee: Michalina Diakow (Poland)

5 June 2026
18:00

Ukraine	0–1	Iceland
	Report (FIFA); Report (UEFA)	Pálmadóttir 25'

Stadion Stali Mielec, Mielec (Poland)
Attendance: 214
Referee: Hristiyana Guteva (Bulgaria)
5 June 2026
21:00

Spain	4–0	England
Guijarro 19'; Putellas 37', 55'; Pina 78'	Report (FIFA); Report (UEFA)

Estadi Mallorca Son Moix, Palma de Mallorca
Attendance: 17,528
Referee: Ivana Martinčić (Croatia)

9 June 2026
21:00 (20:00 UTC+1)

England	3–0	Ukraine
Carter 14'; Stanway 37'; Mead 67'	Report (FIFA); Report (UEFA)

Everton Stadium, Liverpool
Attendance: 26,015
Referee: Emanuela Rusta (Albania)
9 June 2026
21:00 (19:00 UTC)

Iceland	1–6	Spain
Boama 58'	Report (FIFA); Report (UEFA)	López 5', 50'; Imade 37'; Paralluelo 45'; Pina 68'; Bonmatí 84'

Laugardalsvöllur, Reykjavík
Attendance: 2,517
Referee: Miriama Bočková (Slovakia)

=== Group A4 ===
Pos	Team	Pld	W	D	L	GF	GA	GD	Pts	Qualification or relegation	(Germany)	(Norway)	(Austria)	(Slovenia)
1	Germany	6	5	1	0	18	1	+17	16	Qualification to 2027 FIFA Women's World Cup	—	2–0	5–1	5–0
2	Norway	6	4	0	2	11	9	+2	12	Advance to play-offs	0–4	—	2–1	5–0
3	Austria	6	1	1	4	3	9	−6	4	Advance to play-offs	0–0	0–1	—	1–0
4	Slovenia (R)	6	1	0	5	3	16	−13	3	Advance to play-offs and relegation to League B	0–2	2–3	1–0	—

Source: UEFA
Rules for classification: Tiebreakers
(R) Relegated
3 March 2026
17:45

Germany	5–0	Slovenia
Endemann 6'; Senß 12'; Dallmann 48'; Mühlhaus 53'; Schüller 71'	Report (FIFA); Report (UEFA)

Rudolf-Harbig-Stadion, Dresden
Attendance: 19,169
Referee: Eleni Antoniou (Greece)
3 March 2026
18:00

Austria	0–1	Norway
	Report (FIFA); Report (UEFA)	Naalsund 81'

Datenpol Arena, Maria Enzersdorf
Attendance: 1,480
Referee: Kirsty Dowle (England)

7 March 2026
18:00

Norway	0–4	Germany
	Report (FIFA); Report (UEFA)	Senß 18'; Wamser 45+1'; Endemann 45+4'; Brand 58'

Lyse Arena, Stavanger
Attendance: 8,532
Referee: Stéphanie Frappart (France)
7 March 2026
19:00

Slovenia	1–0	Austria
Kramžar 21'	Report (FIFA); Report (UEFA)

Bonifika Stadium, Koper
Attendance: 543
Referee: Hristiyana Guteva (Bulgaria)

14 April 2026
18:00

Norway	5–0	Slovenia
Hegerberg 45+2', 88'; Blakstad 69'; Graham Hansen 76'; Sævik 86'	Report (FIFA); Report (UEFA)

Åråsen Stadion, Lillestrøm
Attendance: 3,658
Referee: Martina Molinaro (Italy)
14 April 2026
18:15

Germany	5–1	Austria
Anyomi 17'; Endemann 52'; Puntigam 68' (o.g.); Brand 76'; Schüller 83'	Report (FIFA); Report (UEFA)	D'Angelo 77'

Max-Morlock-Stadion, Nuremberg
Attendance: 24,237
Referee: Volha Blotskaya (Belarus)

18 April 2026
17:00

Slovenia	2–3	Norway
Zver 43', 70' (pen.)	Report (FIFA); Report (UEFA)	Hegerberg 36'; Jensen 66'; Gaupset 90+2'

Ptuj City Stadium, Ptuj
Attendance: 631
Referee: Rasa Grigonė (Lithuania)
18 April 2026
18:00

Austria	0–0	Germany
	Report (FIFA); Report (UEFA)

BWT X Upper Austrian Arena, Ried im Innkreis
Attendance: 4,300
Referee: Iuliana Demetrescu (Romania)

5 June 2026
18:00

Austria	1–0	Slovenia
Naschenweng 54'	Report (FIFA); Report (UEFA)

Sportclub-Platz Dornbach, Vienna
Attendance: 3,350
Referee: Olatz Rivera Olmedo (Spain)
5 June 2026
20:35

Germany	2–0	Norway
Müller 18'; Wamser 27'	Report (FIFA); Report (UEFA)

RheinEnergieStadion, Cologne
Attendance: 33,425
Referee: Marta Huerta De Aza (Spain)

9 June 2026
18:00

Slovenia	0–2	Germany
	Report (FIFA); Report (UEFA)	Prašnikar 39' (o.g.); Martinez 50'

Stožice Stadium, Ljubljana
Attendance: 3,000
Referee: Michalina Diakow (Poland)
9 June 2026
18:00

Norway	2–1	Austria
Bjelde 46'; Graham Hansen 48'	Report (FIFA); Report (UEFA)	Dunst 51'

Ullevaal Stadion, Oslo
Attendance: 7,256
Referee: Ivana Projkovska (North Macedonia)

== Overall standings ==
Pos	Grp	Team	Pld	W	D	L	GF	GA	GD	Pts
1	A4	Germany	6	5	1	0	18	1	+17	16
2	A3	Spain	6	5	0	1	21	3	+18	15
3	A1	Denmark	6	4	2	0	12	5	+7	14
4	A2	France	6	4	1	1	11	5	+6	13
5	A3	England	6	5	0	1	13	5	+8	15
6	A4	Norway	6	4	0	2	11	9	+2	12
7	A2	Netherlands	6	3	2	1	12	9	+3	11
8	A1	Italy	6	2	3	1	12	4	+8	9
9	A2	Republic of Ireland	6	3	0	3	9	9	0	9
10	A1	Sweden	6	2	2	2	6	6	0	8
11	A3	Iceland	6	2	0	4	3	12	−9	6
12	A4	Austria	6	1	1	4	3	9	−6	4
13	A4	Slovenia	6	1	0	5	3	16	−13	3
14	A2	Poland	6	0	1	5	6	15	−9	1
15	A1	Serbia	6	0	1	5	2	17	−15	1
16	A3	Ukraine	6	0	0	6	2	19	−17	0

Source: UEFA
Rules for classification: Tiebreakers

== Goalscorers ==
There were 146 goals scored in 48 matches, for an average of 3.04 goals per match.

5 goals

- (Spain women's national football team) Edna Imade

4 goals

- (Denmark women's national football team) Pernille Harder
- (England women's national football team) Georgia Stanway
- (France women's national football team) Melvine Malard
- (Spain women's national football team) Vicky López
- (Spain women's national football team) Clàudia Pina

3 goals

- (Denmark women's national football team) Amalie Vangsgaard
- (England women's national football team) Alessia Russo
- (France women's national football team) Marie-Antoinette Katoto
- (Germany women's national football team) Vivien Endemann
- (Norway women's national football team) Ada Hegerberg
- (Poland women's national football team) Ewa Pajor
- (Republic of Ireland women's national football team) Katie McCabe

2 goals

- (Denmark women's national football team) Cecilie Fløe
- (England women's national football team) Jessica Park
- (France women's national football team) Sandy Baltimore
- (Germany women's national football team) Jule Brand
- (Germany women's national football team) Lea Schüller
- (Germany women's national football team) Elisa Senß
- (Germany women's national football team) Carlotta Wamser
- (Italy women's national football team) Arianna Caruso
- (Italy women's national football team) Elisabetta Oliviero
- (Italy women's national football team) Martina Piemonte
- (Netherlands women's national football team) Lineth Beerensteyn
- (Netherlands women's national football team) Wieke Kaptein
- (Norway women's national football team) Caroline Graham Hansen
- (Republic of Ireland women's national football team) Marissa Sheva
- (Slovenia women's national football team) Mateja Zver
- (Spain women's national football team) Alexia Putellas

1 goal

- (Austria women's national football team) Nicole Billa
- (Austria women's national football team) Chiara D'Angelo
- (Austria women's national football team) Barbara Dunst
- (Austria women's national football team) Katharina Naschenweng
- (Austria women's national football team) Louise Schöffel
- (Denmark women's national football team) Sofie Bredgaard
- (Denmark women's national football team) Olivia Holdt
- (Denmark women's national football team) Janni Thomsen
- (England women's national football team) Lucy Bronze
- (England women's national football team) Jess Carter
- (England women's national football team) Lauren Hemp
- (England women's national football team) Beth Mead
- (France women's national football team) Kadidiatou Diani
- (France women's national football team) Sakina Karchaoui
- (Germany women's national football team) Nicole Anyomi
- (Germany women's national football team) Linda Dallmann
- (Germany women's national football team) Shekiera Martinez
- (Germany women's national football team) Larissa Mühlhaus
- (Germany women's national football team) Marie Müller
- (Iceland women's national football team) Alexandra Jóhannsdóttir
- (Iceland women's national football team) Thelma Karen Pálmadóttir
- (Iceland women's national football team) Linda Líf Boama
- (Italy women's national football team) Valentina Bergamaschi
- (Italy women's national football team) Barbara Bonansea
- (Italy women's national football team) Sofia Cantore
- (Italy women's national football team) Cristiana Girelli
- (Italy women's national football team) Giada Greggi
- (Italy women's national football team) Martina Lenzini
- (Netherlands women's national football team) Esmee Brugts
- (Netherlands women's national football team) Veerle Buurman
- (Netherlands women's national football team) Dominique Janssen
- (Netherlands women's national football team) Romée Leuchter
- (Netherlands women's national football team) Victoria Pelova
- (Netherlands women's national football team) Liz Rijsbergen
- (Netherlands women's national football team) Jill Roord
- (Netherlands women's national football team) Renee van Asten
- (Norway women's national football team) Thea Bjelde
- (Norway women's national football team) Julie Blakstad
- (Norway women's national football team) Signe Gaupset
- (Norway women's national football team) Synne Jensen
- (Norway women's national football team) Lisa Naalsund
- (Norway women's national football team) Karina Sævik
- (Poland women's national football team) Ewelina Kamczyk
- (Poland women's national football team) Tanja Pawollek
- (Poland women's national football team) Paulina Tomasiak
- (Republic of Ireland women's national football team) Amber Barrett
- (Republic of Ireland women's national football team) Kyra Carusa
- (Republic of Ireland women's national football team) Abbie Larkin
- (Republic of Ireland women's national football team) Emily Murphy
- (Serbia women's national football team) Allegra Poljak
- (Serbia women's national football team) Sara Stokić
- (Slovenia women's national football team) Zara Kramžar
- (Spain women's national football team) Aitana Bonmatí
- (Spain women's national football team) Lucía Corrales
- (Spain women's national football team) Patricia Guijarro
- (Spain women's national football team) María Méndez
- (Spain women's national football team) Eva Navarro
- (Spain women's national football team) Salma Paralluelo
- (Sweden women's national football team) Filippa Angeldahl
- (Sweden women's national football team) Stina Blackstenius
- (Sweden women's national football team) Monica Jusu Bah
- (Sweden women's national football team) Hanna Lundkvist
- (Sweden women's national football team) Fridolina Rolfö
- (Sweden women's national football team) Johanna Rytting Kaneryd
- (Ukraine women's national football team) Yana Kalinina
- (Ukraine women's national football team) Olha Ovdiychuk

1 own goal

- (Austria women's national football team) Sarah Puntigam (against Germany)
- (Slovenia women's national football team) Lara Prašnikar (against Germany)
