= Renee van Asten =

Dutch footballer (born 2006)

Personal information
- Full name: Renee Margaretha Oda van Asten
- Date of birth: 7 October 2006 (age 20)
- Place of birth: De Ronde Venen, Netherlands
- Height: 1.72 m (5 ft 8 in)
- Position: Defender

Team information
- Current team: Barcelona
- Number: 3

Youth career
- CSW Wilnis
- 2022–2025: Ajax

Senior career*
Years	Team	Apps	(Gls)
2025–2026	Ajax	15	(1)
2026–	Barcelona	1	(1)

International career^{‡}
2021–2022	Netherlands U16	7	(0)
2022–2023	Netherlands U17	7	(0)
2024	Netherlands U20	1	(0)
2026–	Netherlands U23	2	(0)
2026–	Netherlands	2	(1)
- * Club domestic league appearances and goals as of 03:41, August 31, 2026 (UTC) ‡ National team caps and goals as of 23:30, 18 April 2026 (UTC)

Renee Margaretha Oda van Asten (born 7 October 2006) is a Dutch professional footballer who plays as a defender for Liga F club Barcelona and the Netherlands national team. She has previously played for Eredivisie club Ajax, where she was named the Vrouwen Eredivisie Talent of the Year in 2026.

== Early life ==
van Asten was born in De Ronde Venen and grew up in the town of Mijdrecht as the youngest of five siblings. Originally put into dance lessons by her parents, van Asten started playing joined her two older brothers by switching to football around the age of 6. She played multiple years for local club CSW Wilnis before moving to a boys' team later on. While at Wilnis, van Asten won a Dutch 4-a-side street football championship at 9 years old.

In 2022, van Asten joined AFC Ajax's academy at the under-16 level. Over the next few years, she ascended through the U16 ranks before earning a spot on Ajax's under-19 talent team. In 2024, she helped the talent team win the youth KNVB Cup title, scoring a goal in Ajax's championship victory over FC Eindhoven. van Asten was also recruited by Harvard University in the United States, but she chose to stay with Ajax as opposed to playing college soccer for the Crimson.

== Club career ==
van Asten missed the 2024–25 domestic season as she recuperated from a knee injury suffered on international duty. In May 2025, Ajax signed van Asten to a first-team contract, a two-year deal lasting until 2027, ahead of her return to play. van Asten played her first match back from injury on 30 August 2025, participating in a friendly match versus Paris Saint-Germain. On 6 September 2025, she made her competitive professional debut, starting in a league game against ADO Den Haag. She scored her first senior goal on 16 October, netting against Grasshopper Club Zurich to help Ajax qualify for the main stages of the UEFA Women's Europa Cup. As the season continued, van Asten's versatility and positive performances cemented herself as a constant in Ajax's starting lineup. After the end of the 2025–26 league season, Van Asten was named Talent of the Year in the Eredivisie.

On 22 July 2026, van Asten was announced to have been acquired Spanish powerhouse Barcelona via transfer and signed to a four-year contract until 2030. She scored a goal on her Liga F debut on 30 August, contributing to a 5–0 season-opening victory over UD Tenerife.

== International career ==
van Asten has represented the Netherlands at multiple youth international levels. In 2022 and 2023, she played for and captained the under-17 national team. In July 2023, she was named to the roster that competed in the 2023 UEFA Women's Under-19 Championship, but an injury prevented her from competing. The following year, she was called up to play for the under-20s at the 2024 FIFA U-20 Women's World Cup. However, she sustained a cruciate ligament injury in a pre-tournament friendly against Spain that forced her to withdraw and watch on from afar as the Netherlands finished the tournament in fourth place. Injury problems would continue to be a trend for van Asten, who was also forced to withdraw from two matches in 2025 due to health concerns.

In April 2026, van Asten, who had been expecting to be spending the window playing for the Netherlands youth program, received her first senior national team call-up ahead of a pair of the Netherlands' 2027 FIFA Women's World Cup qualification matches against France. On 14 April, she made her senior international debut and scored her first senior goal, starting and netting the opener in a 2–1 Dutch victory to start off the series with a win.

== Personal life ==
While playing professionally with Ajax, van Asten was also an active student at the Vrije Universiteit Amsterdam. She initially enrolled to study law before later changing her focus to criminology.

== Career statistics ==
=== Club ===
As of 28 April 2026

Appearances and goals by club, season and competition
Club	Season	League			Cup		Continental (Note: Includes the UEFA Women's Europa Cup)		Total	
Club	Season	Division	Apps	Goals	Apps	Goals	Apps	Goals	Apps	Goals
AFC Ajax	2025–26	Eredivisie	15	1	—		5	1	20	2
Career total			15	1	0	0	5	1	20	2

=== International ===
As of match played 9 June 2026

Appearances and goals by national team and year
National team	Year	Apps	Goals
Netherlands	2026	3	1
Total		3	1

Scores and results list Netherlands' goal tally first, score column indicates score after each van Asten goal.

List of international goals scored by Renee van Asten
No.	Date	Venue	Opponent	Score	Result	Competition
1	14 April 2026	Rat Verlegh Stadion, Breda, Netherlands	France	1–0	2–1	2027 FIFA Women's World Cup qualification

== Honours ==
Individual

- Eredivisie Talent of the Year: 2025–26
