= Mayssa Baha =

Moroccan footballer (born 2011)

Personal information
- Full name: Mayssa Baha Abelhadj
- Date of birth: 16 January 2011 (age 15)
- Place of birth: Málaga, Spain
- Height: 1.74 m (5 ft 9 in)
- Position: Forward

Team information
- Current team: Barcelona
- Number: 31

Youth career
- FUS
- Málaga
- Barcelona

Senior career*
| Years | Team | Apps | (Gls) |
| 2026– | Barcelona | 3 | (1) |

International career
- Morocco U17
- * Club domestic league appearances and goals

Mayssa Baha Abelhadj (Arabic: ميساء بهاء أبيلحاج, pronounced [ˈmiːsaː bɦaː ʔaːbiːlˈħaːd͡ʒ]; born 16 February 2011) is a professional footballer who plays as a forward for Liga F club Barcelona. Born in Spain, she plays for the Morocco under-17 national team. She is the youngest player, male or female, to ever score for Barcelona, as well as the youngest player to ever score in Liga F.

== Early life ==
Baha was born on 16 February 2011 in Málaga, Spain and is a native of the city. The daughter of Morocco international Nabil Baha, she is the younger sister of Moroccan footballer Ziyad Baha.

== Club career ==
As a youth player, Baha joined the youth academy of Moroccan side FUS. Following her stint there, she joined the youth academy of Málaga in Spain, where she played under Spanish manager Rubén Gallego.

Subsequently, she joined the youth academy of Spanish outfit Barcelona at the age of 13. Ahead of the 2026–27 season, she was promoted to the club's senior team. In a Liga F match against Logroño United on 26 September 2026, she scored her first senior goal for the club in what would end in a 2–0 away victory for Barcelona at the Estadio Las Gaunas in Las Gaunas, Logroño, La Rioja. The goal made her the youngest goalscorer, male or female, in Barcelona's history, breaking a record set by Spanish men's team player Lamine Yamal, as well as the youngest ever goalscorer in Liga F.

== International career ==
Baha is a Morocco youth international and is eligible to represent Spain internationally, having been born in the country. During the autumn of 2025, she played for the Morocco women's national under-17 football team at the 2025 FIFA U-17 Women's World Cup.

== Style of play ==
Baha plays as a forward. Spanish newspaper Artículo 14 wrote in 2026 that she is "a 1.74-metre-tall striker with a physique that allows her to compete with older players and a remarkable knack for finding the net. Her goalscoring instinct is precisely one of the aspects that has stood out most in her career".
