= 2021–22 Supercopa de España Femenina =

2021–22 Supercopa de España
Spanish Women's Super Cup

Tournament details
- Host country: Spain
- City: Las Rozas de Madrid
- Dates: 19–23 January 2022
- Teams: 4

Final positions
- Champions: Barcelona (2nd title)
- Runners-up: Atlético Madrid

Tournament statistics
- Matches played: 3
- Goals scored: 13 (4.33 per match)
- Attendance: 2,323 (774 per match)
- Top scorer: Caroline Graham Hansen (3 goals)

The 2021–22 Supercopa de España Femenina was the third edition of the current Supercopa de España Femenina, an annual women's football competition for clubs in the Spanish football league system that were successful in its major competitions in the preceding season.

Barcelona won the tournament for their second Supercopa title.

== Draw ==
The draw for the competition was held on 7 January 2022. The Final took place at La Ciudad del Fútbol in Las Rozas de Madrid on 23 January 2022.

== Qualification ==
The competition featured both finalists of the 2020–21 Copa de la Reina, as well as the next two highest-ranked clubs at the 2020–21 Primera División that had not already qualified through the cup final.

=== Qualified teams ===
The following four teams qualified for the tournament.

Team	Method of qualification
Barcelona	2020–21 Primera División and 2020–21 Copa de la Reina winner
Levante	2020–21 Copa de la Reina finalist
Real Madrid	2020–21 Primera División runner-up
Atlético Madrid	2020–21 Primera División fourth

== Matches ==
=== Bracket ===
Semi-finals
19 January 2022
Barcelona	1
Real Madrid	0
20 January 2022
Levante	2
Atlético Madrid	3

Final
23 January 2022
Barcelona	7
Atlético Madrid	0

=== Semi-finals ===
19 January 2022
19:15

Barcelona	1–0	Real Madrid
A. Putellas 90+1'	Report

La Ciudad del Fútbol, Las Rozas de Madrid
Attendance: 700
Referee: Olatz Rivera Olmedo (Basque Country)

20 January 2022
19:30

Levante	2–3	Atlético Madrid
Carol 41'; Gio 80'	Report	D. Castellanos 31'; M. López 71'; Ludmila 77'

La Ciudad del Fútbol, Las Rozas de Madrid
Attendance: 500
Referee: Eugenia Gil Soriano (Galicia)

=== Final ===
23 January 2022
12:00

Barcelona	7–0	Atlético Madrid
Engen 16'; Hansen 24', 27', 50'; Rolfö 47'; Martens 85', 90'	Report

La Ciudad del Fútbol, Las Rozas de Madrid
Attendance: 1,123
Referee: Marta Huerta de Aza (Tenerife)

Barcelona	Atlético Madrid

GK	1	(Spain) Sandra Paños
DF	2	(Spain) Irene Paredes	(substituted off) 74'
DF	3	(Spain) Jana Fernández	(substituted off) 65'
DF	8	(Spain) Marta Torrejón
DF	16	(Sweden) Fridolina Rolfö	(substituted off) 65'
MF	11	(Spain) Alexia Putellas (c)	(substituted off) 65'
MF	12	(Spain) Patricia Guijarro
MF	23	(Norway) Ingrid Engen	(substituted off) 74'
FW	7	(Norway) Caroline Graham Hansen
FW	10	(Spain) Jennifer Hermoso	(yellow card) 78'
FW	22	(Netherlands) Lieke Martens
Substitutes:
DF	4	(Spain) María Pilar León	(substituted in) 74'
DF	5	(Spain) Melanie Serrano	(substituted in) 74'
DF	15	(Spain) Leila Ouahabi	(substituted in) 65'
DF	17	(Spain) Andrea Pereira	(substituted in) 65'
FW	6	(Spain) Clàudia Pina
FW	20	(Nigeria) Asisat Oshoala	(substituted in) 65'
Manager:
(Spain) Jonatan Giráldez

GK	1	(Sweden) Hedvig Lindahl
DF	4	(Spain) Laia Aleixandri
DF	5	(Netherlands) Merel van Dongen
DF	11	(Spain) Carmen Menayo	(substituted off) 59'
DF	19	(France) Aïssatou Tounkara
MF	7	(Spain) Maitane López	(yellow card) 23'
MF	10	(Colombia) Leicy Santos	(substituted off) 59'
MF	15	(Spain) Silvia Meseguer (c)	(substituted off) 85'
FW	8	(Brazil) Ludmila da Silva	(substituted off) 71'
FW	9	(Venezuela) Deyna Castellanos	(substituted off) 71'
FW	21	(Spain) Sheila García
Substitutes:
GK	13	(Spain) Lola Gallardo
GK	24	(Spain) Paula Vizoso
DF	27	(Sweden) Hanna Lundkvist
MF	6	(Spain) Amanda Sampedro	(substituted in) 59'
MF	14	(Spain) Virginia Torrecilla	(substituted in) 85'
MF	17	(Spain) Bárbara Latorre	(substituted in) 59'
MF	22	(Argentina) Estefanía Banini	(substituted in) 71'
MF	23	(Spain) Claudia Iglesias
FW	16	(Nigeria) Rasheedat Ajibade	(substituted in) 71'
Manager:
(Spain) Óscar Fernández

== See also ==
- 2021–22 Primera División
- 2021–22 Copa de la Reina
