= Kerolin =

Brazilian footballer (born 1999)

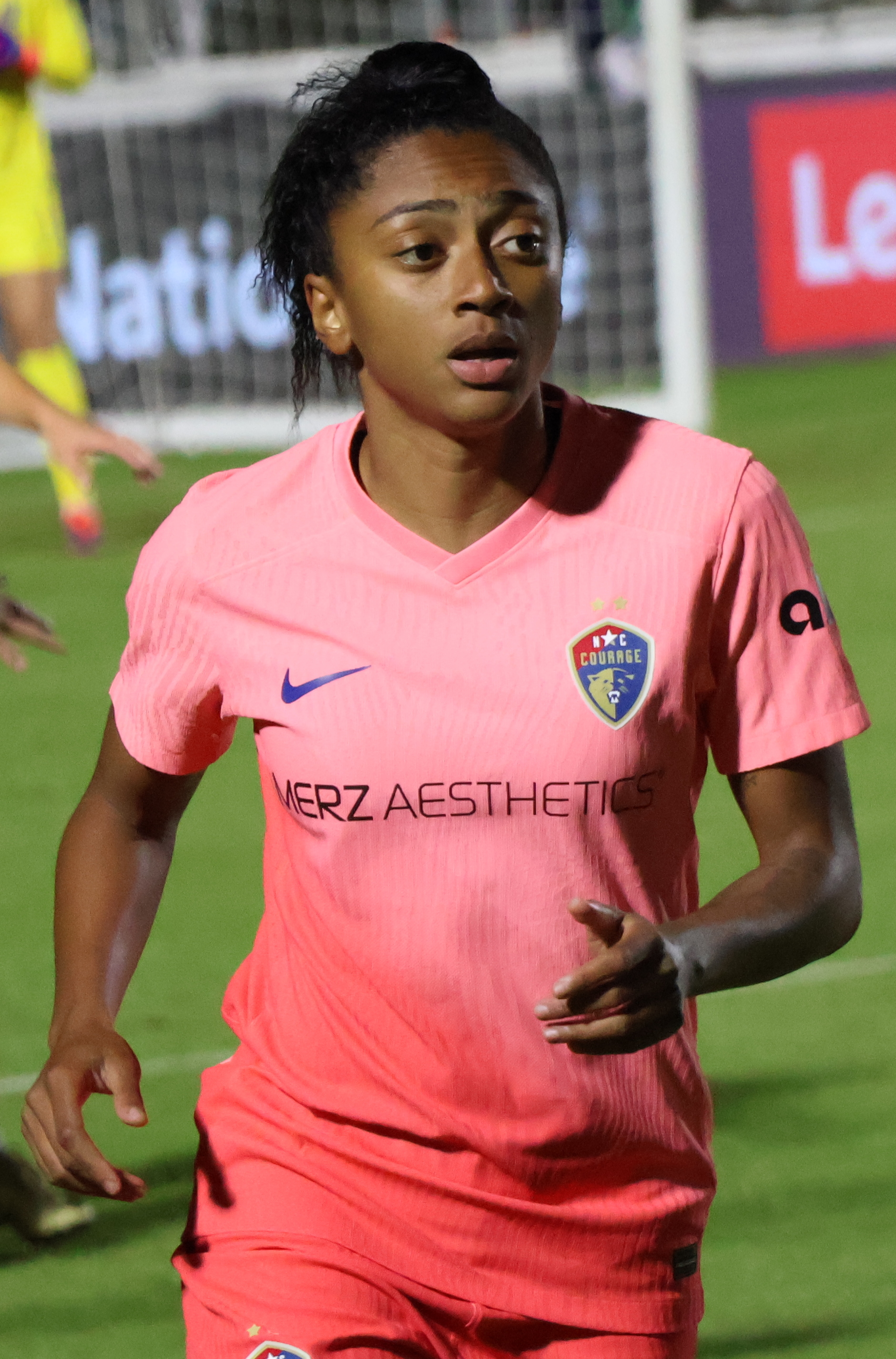
- Kerolin with the North Carolina Courage in 2024

Personal information
- Full name: Kerolin Nicoli Israel Ferraz
- Date of birth: 17 November 1999 (age 26)
- Place of birth: Bauru, São Paulo, Brazil
- Height: 1.64 m (5 ft 5 in)
- Positions: Right winger; forward

Team information
- Current team: Barcelona
- Number: 7

Senior career*
Years	Team	Apps	(Gls)
2016	Valinhos		
2017	Ponte Preta	17	(4)
2017	→ Corinthians/Audax (loan)	4	(0)
2018	Ponte Preta	23	(8)
2018	→ Osasco Audax (loan)	3	(1)
2019	Palmeiras	0	(0)
2020–2021	Madrid CFF	24	(5)
2022–2025	North Carolina Courage	37	(17)
2025–2026	Manchester City	26	(12)
2026–	Barcelona	9	(2)

International career^{‡}
2018	Brazil U-20		
2018–	Brazil	60	(15)
Medal record
Women's football
Representing Brazil
Copa América Femenina
Winner	2025 Ecuador
Olympic Games
Silver medal – second place	2024 Paris
- * Club domestic league appearances and goals as of 20:29, 4 November 2026 (UTC) ‡ National team caps and goals as of 23:40, 25 April 2026 (UTC)

Kerolin Nicoli Israel Ferraz (Brazilian Portuguese: [keɾoˈlĩ niˈkɔli izʁaˈɛw feˈʁas]; born 17 November 1999), commonly known mononymously as Kerolin, is a Brazilian professional footballer who plays as a right winger or forward for Liga F club Barcelona and the Brazil national team.

In 2018, she was elected the breakout female player in the Brasileirão by the Brazilian Football Confederation, having scored 14 goals in 35 games for Ponte Preta. She was named the NWSL Most Valuable Player with the North Carolina Courage in 2023.

== Early life ==
Kerolin was raised by her mother and was estranged from her father. The family lived in Bauru, then moved to Campinas, where they lodged on a farm as they could not afford to pay rent. When she was 12 years old she was hospitalised with osteomyelitis and cellulitis in her leg and advised to stop playing contact sport.

== Club career ==
=== Early career ===
Kerolin was among several promising young footballers to emerge from the youth system of Valinhos Futebol Clube, a women's team run by the local authority's sports and leisure department and coached by Ana Lúcia Gonçalves. Valinhos agreed a collaboration with Guarani FC in January 2016, to enter the 2016 Campeonato Paulista de Futebol Feminino as Guarani/Valinhos.

When Associação Atlética Ponte Preta decided to form a women's section in 2017, they took over the Valinhos club, with 17-year-old Kerolin among the squad they inherited. She was voted the best player of the 2017 Campeonato Paulista after scoring 10 goals in 21 games for semi-finalists Ponte Preta.

She was then sent on loan to Corinthians/Audax for their successful 2017 Copa Libertadores Femenina campaign in October 2017. She scored in a penalty shootout win over Colo-Colo following a 0–0 draw in the final at Estadio Arsenio Erico, Asunción.

In 2018 she scored 14 goals in 35 games for Ponte Preta and was named Campeonato Brasileiro de Futebol Feminino "Revelação" (transl. Revelation) at the end of season awards. It was reported that Kerolin's consistently good performances for Ponte Preta and the youth national teams made her a transfer target for other Brazilian clubs, as well as for professional clubs in France and China.

The combined Corinthians/Audax team which Kerolin had helped to win the 2017 Copa Libertadores split when Corinthians withdrew from that partnership and set up their own women's team. This left Audax with a slot at the 2018 Copa Libertadores Femenina but with no team. A deal was made for Valinhos (who had been playing as Ponte Preta in domestic competitions) to represent Audax at the Copa Libertadores. Kerolin scored in a 4–0 win over Peñarol, but Audax were eliminated at the group stage.

Palmeiras urgently required a women's team in December 2018, as they faced being banned from the lucrative men's Copa Libertadores under CONMEBOL rules which required all participants to run women's teams. A partnership agreement saw Palmeiras agree to fund the salaries of the Valinhos players and staff, who would use the Palmeiras name but continue to play and train in Valinhos.

=== Palmeiras and doping ban ===
In January 2019 Kerolin agreed the transfer to Palmeiras, signing a one-year contract and joining up again with her previous coach Ana Lúcia Gonçalves. The following month it was announced that Kerolin had failed a doping test after testing positive for GW1516 after playing for Audax in a match at the 2018 Copa Libertadores Femenina. Kerolin's sample revealed traces of GW1516. She remained provisionally suspended by CONMEBOL in July 2019, when Palmeiras's coach Gonçalves was sacked on suspicion of involvement in doping cases affecting the clubs she had worked at and inappropriately acting as a sports agent for the players in her charge. After a tribunal hearing, Kerolin was issued with a two-year ban that expired in January 2021.

=== Madrid ===
In April 2021, having served her ban, Kerolin transferred to Madrid CFF. She joined several other Brazilian players at the Spanish Primera División club, and thanked God for the opportunity to restart her football career.

=== North Carolina Courage ===
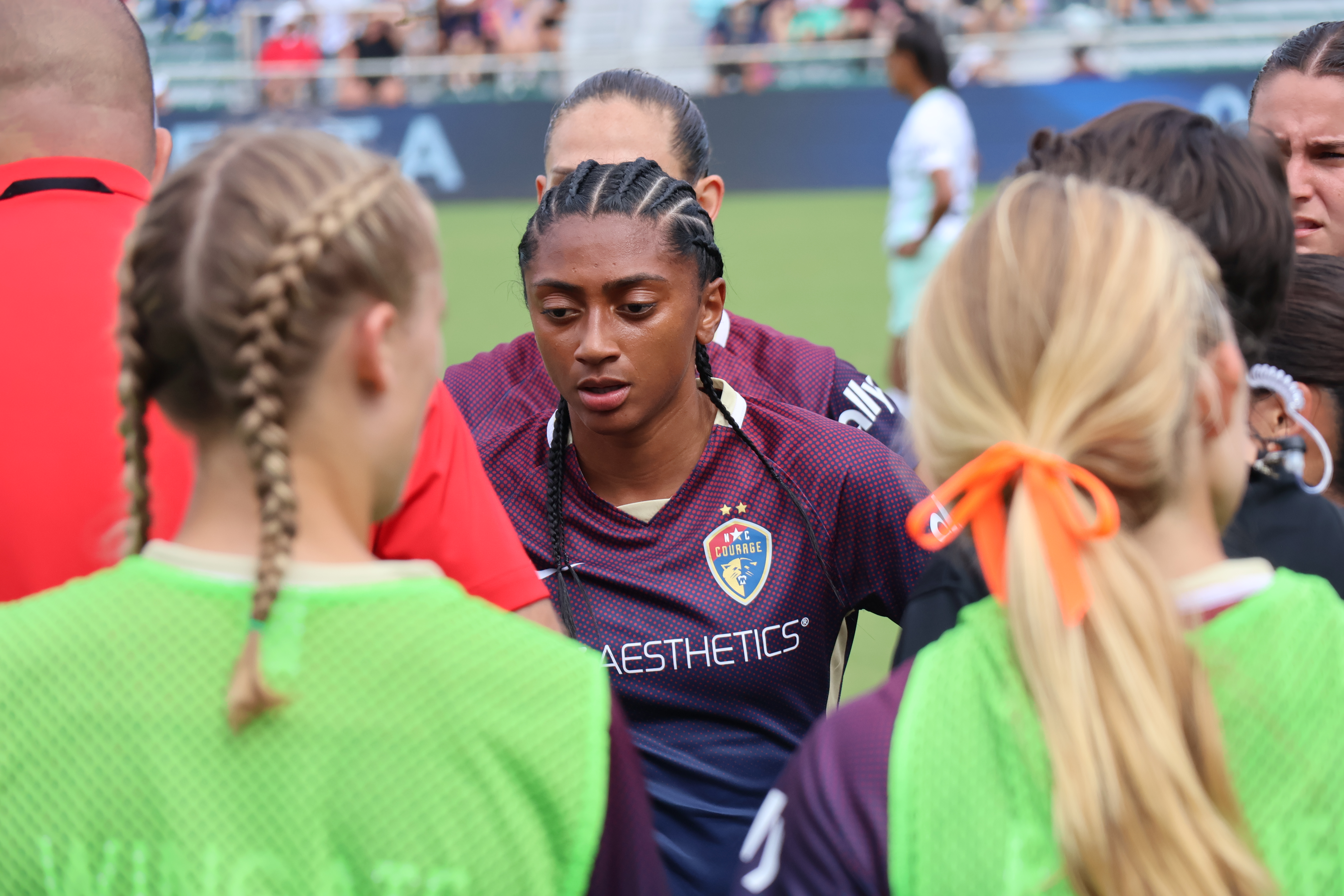
Kerolin in a huddle after scoring in the 2023 NWSL Challenge Cup final

On 10 January 2022, Kerolin signed a three-year deal with the North Carolina Courage. She made her club debut as a substitute in the opening Challenge Cup game against NJ/NY Gotham FC on 3 April. She scored her first goal for the Courage in the Challenge Cup final, opening in a 2–1 win over the Washington Spirit and being named the most valuable player of the match. She started 13 games in the 2022 regular season and recorded six goals and four assists. At the end of the season, she was named to the NWSL Best XI second team.

On 10 June 2023, Kerolin scored her first NWSL hat-trick in a 5–0 win over the Chicago Red Stars. She contributed to the Courage's defense of the Challenge Cup, scoring in the final against Racing Louisville. Her tally of 10 regular-season goals was second only to Golden Boot winner Sophia Smith, leading the Courage to finish the regular season third in the standings. However, she suffered an anterior cruciate ligament tear days before the playoffs, and the Courage lost to eventual champions NJ/NY Gotham FC in the opening round. After the season, Kerolin was voted the NWSL Most Valuable Player, becoming the first South American to win the award.

Kerolin scored in her second match back from injury on 29 September 2024, a 3–1 win over the Chicago Red Stars. She made six club appearances in the season, with one of her three starts in a 1–0 quarterfinal loss to the Kansas City Current.

=== Manchester City ===
On 22 January 2025, Kerolin was signed by Women's Super League club Manchester City on a deal until the summer of 2028. A month later, on 9 February, she netted her first goal in a 3–1 victory over Leicester City in the FA Cup. On 1 February 2026, she scored a hat-trick in a 5–1 win over Chelsea, becoming the first player to accomplish this against a reigning champion.

=== Barcelona ===
On 4 August 2026, Kerolin joined Liga F side Barcelona on a contact until 2030 for a reported fee of around £1.3m, the largest fee for a female Brazilian player.

== International career ==
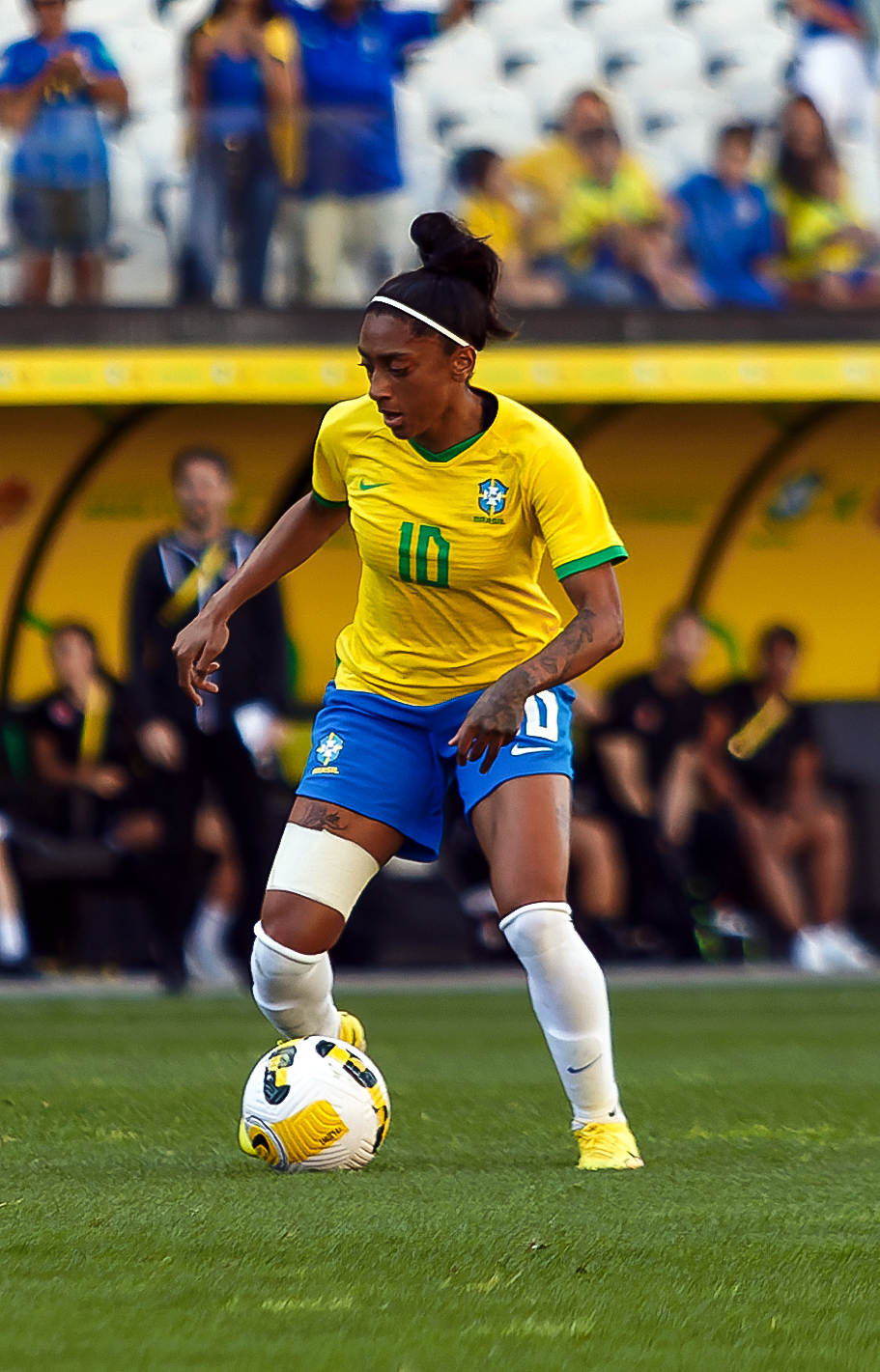
Kerolin in 2022

Kerolin was one of four Guarani/Valinhos players to be called up by the Brazil women's national under-17 football team for the 2016 South American U-17 Women's Championship. She remained in the squad for the 2016 FIFA U-17 Women's World Cup in Jordan. In 2018, Kerolin scored two goals over three games she played representing the Brazil women's national under-20 football team at the FIFA U-20 Women's World Cup in France.

The senior Brazil women's national football team head coach Vadão called Kerolin up for the first time in September 2018, for a friendly match against England at Meadow Lane, Nottingham. She earned her first cap in the match, appearing as a 56th-minute substitute for Debinha in Brazil's 1–0 defeat.

After breaking into the senior national team, she was praised by veteran teammate Formiga: "Kerolin has a huge future. She's got so much talent and she doesn't have fear. If she keeps her feet on the ground, she can go as far as she wants. It's up to her."

Kerolin was not eligible to play at the 2019 FIFA Women's World Cup because she was provisionally suspended from football and still awaiting the final judgement from CONMEBOL in respect of her failed doping tests.

On 6 January 2021, Kerolin's suspension ended and she was called into a national team training camp for evaluation by Brazil's new coach Pia Sundhage. Sundhage said: "I heard a lot of good things about her [Kerolin]. She is an excellent player. Yes, she has been out of action for two years, but we will see how she will do."

Kerolin played the 2023 FIFA Women's World Cup, where Brazil fell in the group stage.

In 2024, Kerolin won a silver medal at the 2024 Summer Olympics. She scored one goal in the tournament, the last in Brazil's 4-2 defeat of Spain in the semifinals, but wound up missing the final lost to the United States.

== Career statistics ==
=== Club ===
As of match played 1 November 2026

Appearances and goals by club, season and competition
Club	Season	League			Playoff (Note: NWSL Playoffs)		State league (Note: Campeonato Paulista de Futebol Feminino)		National cup (Note: Includes Copa de la Reina, Women's FA Cup)		League cup (Note: Includes NWSL Challenge Cup, Women's League Cup)		Continental		Total			
Club	Season	Division	Apps	Goals	Apps	Goals	Apps	Goals	Apps	Goals	Apps	Goals	Apps	Goals	Apps	Goals		
Ponte Preta	2017	Brasileirão Feminino	14	2	—		3	2	—		—		—		17	4		
Ponte Preta	2018	Brasileirão Feminino	10	3	—		13	5	—		—		—		23	8		
Ponte Preta	Total		24	5	—		16	7	0	0	0	0	0	0	40	12		
Corinthians/Audax (loan)	2017	Brasileirão Feminino	—		—		—		—		—		4	0	4	0		
Osasco Audax (loan)	2018	Brasileirão Feminino	—		—		—		—		—		3 (Note: Appearance(s) in Copa Libertadores Femenina)	1	3	1		
Palmeiras	2019	Brasileirão Feminino	0	0	—		0	0	—		—		0	0	0	0		
Madrid CFF	2020–21	Primera División	10	1	—		—		1	0	—		—		11	1		
Madrid CFF	2021–22	Primera División	14	4	—		—		0	0	—		—		14	4		
Madrid CFF	Total		24	5	0	0	0	0	1	0	0	0	0	0	25	5		
North Carolina Courage	2022	NWSL	13	6	—		—		—		5	1	—		18	7		
North Carolina Courage	2023	NWSL	19	10	0	0	—		—		5	1	—		24	11		
North Carolina Courage	2024	NWSL	5	1	1	0	—		—		—		—		6	1		
North Carolina Courage	Total		37	17	1	0	0	0	0	0	10	2	0	0	48	19		
Manchester City	2024–25	Women's Super League	11	3	—		—		3	1	2	0	2 (Note: Appearance(s) in UEFA Women's Champions League)	0	18	4		
Manchester City	2025–26	Women's Super League	15	9	—		—		3	0	1	1	—		19	10		
Manchester City	Total		26	12	0	0	0	0	6	1	3	1	2	0	37	14		
Barcelona	2026–27	Liga F	9	2	—		—		0	0	—		2	1	0	0	11	3
Career total			120	41	1	0	16	7	7	1	13	3	9	1	157	51		

=== International ===
As of match played 18 April 2026

Appearances and goals by national team and year
National team	Year	Apps	Goals
Brazil	2018	2	0
Brazil	2021	7	5
Brazil	2022	20	0
Brazil	2023	8	0
Brazil	2024	7	1
Brazil	2025	10	6
Brazil	2026	6	3
Total		60	15

Scores and results list Brazil's goal tally first, score column indicates score after each Kerolin goal.

List of international goals scored by Kerolin
No.	Date	Venue	Opponent	Score	Result	Competition
1	20 September 2021	Amigão, Paraíba, Brazil	Argentina	1–0	4–1	Friendly
2	26 November 2021	Arena da Amazônia, Manaus, Brazil	India	4–1	6–1	2021 International Women's Football Tournament of Manaus
3	28 November 2021	Arena da Amazônia, Manaus, Brazil	Venezuela	1–1	4–1	2021 International Women's Football Tournament of Manaus
4	28 November 2021	Arena da Amazônia, Manaus, Brazil	Venezuela	3–1	4–1	2021 International Women's Football Tournament of Manaus
5	1 December 2021	Chile	1–0	2–0	2021 International Women's Football Tournament of Manaus	
6	6 August 2024	Stade Vélodrome, Marseille, France	Spain	4–1	4–2	2024 Summer Olympics
7	8 April 2025	PayPal Park, San Jose, United States	United States	1–1	2–1	Friendly
8	30 May 2025	Arena Corinthians, São Paulo, Brazil	Japan	3–0	3–1	Friendly
9	27 June 2025	Stade des Alpes, Grenoble, France	France	2–0	2–3	Friendly
10	16 July 2025	Estadio Gonzalo Pozo Ripalda, Quito, Ecuador	Bolivia	3–0	6–0	2025 Copa América Femenina
11	16 July 2025	Estadio Gonzalo Pozo Ripalda, Quito, Ecuador	Bolivia	4–0	6–0	2025 Copa América Femenina
12	16 July 2025	Estadio Gonzalo Pozo Ripalda, Quito, Ecuador	Bolivia	5–0	6–0	2025 Copa América Femenina
13	27 February 2026	Estadio Alejandro Morera Soto, Alajuela, Costa Rica	Costa Rica	1–0	5–2	Friendly
14	11 April 2026	Arena Pantanal, Cuiabá, Brazil	South Korea	4–0	5–1	2026 FIFA Series
15	14 April 2026	Arena Pantanal, Cuiabá, Brazil	Zambia	5–0	6–1	2026 FIFA Series

== Honours ==
North Carolina Courage

- NWSL Challenge Cup: 2022, 2023

Manchester City

- Women's Super League: 2025–26
- Women's FA Cup: 2025–26

Brazil

- Copa América Femenina: 2022
- Summer Olympics silver medal: 2024

Individual

- NWSL First XI: 2023
- NWSL Second XI: 2022
- NWSL Most Valuable Player: 2023
