= 2027 Supercopa de España Femenina =

2027 Supercopa de España
Spanish Women's Super Cup

Tournament details
- Host country: Spain
- Dates: 19–24 January 2027
- Teams: 4

The 2027 Supercopa de España Femenina is the eighth edition of the current Supercopa de España Femenina, an annual women's football competition for clubs in the Spanish football league system that were successful in its major competitions in the preceding season.

== Qualification ==
The competition features both finalists (Barcelona and Atlético Madrid) of the 2025–26 Copa de la Reina, as well as the next two highest-ranked clubs in the 2025–26 Liga F that had not already qualified through the cup final: Real Madrid (2nd) and Real Sociedad (3rd). The location of the tournament will be announced at a later date by the RFEF.

=== Qualified teams ===
The following four teams qualified for the tournament :

Team	Method of qualification	Appearance	Last appearance as	Total performance		
Team	Method of qualification	Appearance	Last appearance as	Winner	Runner-up	Semi-finalist
Barcelona	2025–26 Copa de la Reina winner	8th	2025–26 winner	6	0	1
Atlético Madrid	2025–26 Copa de la Reina runner-up	7th	2025–26 semi-finalist	1	1	4
Real Madrid	2025–26 Liga F runner-up	6th	2025–26 runner-up	0	2	3
Real Sociedad	2025–26 Liga F third place	4th	2024–25 semi-finalist	0	2	1

Coincidentally, it's the same men's four teams that will participate in this year's 2027 Supercopa de España.

== Matches ==
=== Bracket ===
Semi-finals
19 January 2027
Barcelona
Real Sociedad
19 January 2027
Real Madrid
Atlético Madrid

Final
24 January 2027

=== Semi-finals ===
19 January 2027
CET (UTC+1)

Barcelona	v	Real Sociedad

19 January 2027
CET (UTC+1)

Real Madrid	v	Atlético Madrid

=== Final ===
24 January 2027
CET (UTC+1)

v

Manager:	Manager:

Most valuable player (MVP):

Assistant referees:

Fourth official:

Match rules

- 90 minutes.
- Penalty shoot-out if scores still level.
- Maximum of twelve named substitutes.
- Maximum of five substitutions, with a sixth allowed in extra time.
- Maximum of one concussion substitution.

== See also ==
- 2026–27 Copa de la Reina
- 2026–27 Liga F
