= Combinatie Sportclub Wilnis =

Dutch football club

Combinatie Sportclub Wilnis (CSW, originally meaning Christelijke Sportclub Wilnis) is an association football from Wilnis founded on 7 June 1946. Its top men's team competed in the Eerste klasse Saturday, having promoted from second position Tweede Klasse in 2017. The club is very active also in women's soccer, often competing for the women's national cup.

== History ==
From 1946 through the 1970s, CSW mainly played in local leagues and also spent a few years in the Vierde and Derde Klasse. In the 1980s through 2000s it competed mainly in the Tweede Klasse with only some seasons spent in the Eerste Klasse and Derde Klasse. In the 2010s the team is most frequently playing in the Eerste Klasse.

CSW won section championships in the Vierde Klasse (in 1975), Derde Klasse (in 1979, 1981 and 2009), and Tweede Klasse (in 2010 and 2015). It won the championship in 2015 after beating Mijdrecht-side, SV Argon, 3–2.

== Externe link ==
- Official site
