= Supercopa de España Femenina =

- Organiser(s): Royal Spanish Football Federation
- Founded: 1997 (original format); 2019 (new format)
- Region: Spain
- Teams: 2 (until 2000); 4 (2019–present)
- Current champions: Barcelona (6th title)
- Most championships: Barcelona (6 titles)
- Website: rfef.es
- 2027 Supercopa de España Femenina

The Supercopa de España Femenina or the Spanish Women's Super Cup is a super cup tournament in Spanish football, contested by the winners and runners up of the Copa de la Reina and the remaining highest ranked teams from the Primera División that had not already qualified through the cup final.

== History ==
From 1997 to 2000, four editions of the Supercopa were played between the winners of the League and the Copa de la Reina, with San Vicente CFF winning its first edition, Atlético Málaga the second, Eibartarrak FT achieving the third edition and Levante (after absorbing San Vicente) winning the last.

The competition was re-instated in December 2019 by the Royal Spanish Football Federation. It was announced the Supercopa would expand to four teams, the winners and runners-up of the Copa de la Reina and Primera División.

== Finals by year ==
=== Two-team format ===
Year	Winners	Runners-up	Scores
1997	San Vicente	Espanyol	2–5, 2–1
1998	Atlético Málaga	Lagunak	4–3, 1–0
1999	Eibartarrak	Oroquieta Villaverde	3–0, 0–5
2000	Levante	Puebla	5–1, 1–2

=== Four-team format ===
Season	Host	Winners	Runners-up	Score	Semi-finalists
2019–20	Helmántico, Villares de la Reina	Barcelona	Real Sociedad	10–1	Atlético Madrid and Levante
2020–21	Juegos Mediterráneos, Almería	Atlético Madrid	Levante	3–0	Barcelona and Logroño
2021–22	La Ciudad del Fútbol, Las Rozas de Madrid	Barcelona	Atlético Madrid	7–0	Real Madrid and Levante
2022–23	Estadio Romano, Mérida	Barcelona	Real Sociedad	3–0	Real Madrid and Sporting Huelva
2023–24	Estadio Municipal de Butarque, Leganés	Barcelona	Levante	7–0	Atlético Madrid and Real Madrid
2024–25	Estadio Municipal de Butarque, Leganés	Barcelona	Real Madrid	5–0	Atlético Madrid and Real Sociedad
2025–26	Nou Estadi Castàlia, Castellón de la Plana	Barcelona	Real Madrid	2–0	Atlético Madrid and Athletic Bilbao

== See also ==
- Women's football in Spain
