= 2024–25 FC Bayern Munich (women) season =

Bayern Munich (women)
2024–25 season
- President: Herbert Hainer
- Head coach: Alexander Straus
- Stadium: FC Bayern Campus
- Bundesliga: 1st
- DFB-Pokal: Winners
- DFB-Supercup: Winners
- UEFA Champions League: Quarter-finals
- Top goalscorer: League: Pernille Harder (14 goals); All: Pernille Harder (23 goals)
Home colours	Away colours	Third colours

The 2024–25 FC Bayern Munich Frauen season is the club's 25th consecutive season in the Bundesliga. Bayern Munich starts the season with a derby against VfL Wolfsburg in the newly reinstated DFB-Supercup on 25 August 2024.

== Season events ==
On 5 June 2024, Bayern Munich announced the signing of Ena Mahmutovic from MSV Duisburg on contract until 20 June 2027.

On 19 June 2024, Bayern Munich announced that Karólína Lea Vilhjálmsdóttir, who was on loan to Bayer Leverkusen during the 2023–24 season, prolonged her contract until 30 June 2026 and also prolonged her loan to Bayer Leverkusen for another season.

On 1 July 2024, Bayern Munich announced that Bianca Rech has been promoted from the department head to director of the women's section of the club, as a result of internal restructuring.

On 9 July 2024, Bayern Munich announced that the defender Giulia Gwinn, who has accumulated a total of 28 appearances for Bayern Munich in the previous season, has prolonged her contract until 30 June 2027.

On 21 July 2024, Bayern Munich announced that Natalia Padilla, who has just returned from a loan to 1. FC Köln has been loaned to Sevilla for the 2024–25 season.

On 30 July 2024, Bayern Munich announced the signing of Julia Zigiotti Olme from the Super League club Brighton & Hove Albion on contract until 30 June 2026.

On 13 August 2024, Bayern Munich announced that Jovana Damnjanović prolonged her contract by two years, until 30 June 2027.

== Players ==
No.	Pos.	Nat.	Name	Age	EU	Since	App.	Goals	Ends	Notes
Goalkeepers
1	GK	(Germany)	Maria Luisa Grohs	25	EU	2019	69	0	2026	
32	GK	(Germany)	Ena Mahmutovic	22	EU	2024	0	0	2027	
41	GK	(Germany)	Anna Wellmann	31	EU	2023	3	0	2026	
Defenders
2	DF	(Sweden)	Linda Sembrant	39	EU	2024	13	1	2025	
4	DF	(Iceland)	Glódís Perla Viggósdóttir	30	Non-EU	2021	100	8	2026	
5	DF	(Sweden)	Magdalena Eriksson	32	EU	2023	20	5	2026	
6	DF	(Norway)	Tuva Hansen	28	Non-EU	2023	38	0	2026	
7	DF	(Germany)	Giulia Gwinn	26	EU	2019	85	14	2027	
13	DF	(Brazil)	Tainara	27	Non-EU	2022	30	2	2025	
15	DF	(Colombia)	Ana María Guzmán	21	Non-EU	2023	0	0	2027	
19	DF	(Austria)	Katharina Naschenweng	28	EU	2023	27	3	2026	
22	DF	(France)	Magou Doucouré	25	EU	2024	0	0	2025	
28	DF	(Germany)	Michelle Ulbrich	29	EU	2025	0	0	2025	
30	DF	(Germany)	Carolin Simon	33	EU	2019	108	15	2025	
Midfielders
8	MF	(Germany)	Lena Oberdorf	24	EU	2024	0	0	2028	
10	MF	(Germany)	Linda Dallmann	31	EU	2019	139	48	2026	
12	MF	(Germany)	Sydney Lohmann	25	EU	2016	146	30	2026	
14	MF	(Germany)	Alara Şehitler	19	EU	2023	6	1	2027	
16	MF	(Sweden)	Julia Zigiotti Olme	28	EU	2024	0	0	2026	
18	MF	(Japan)	Momoko Tanikawa	21	Non-EU	2025	0	0		
25	MF	(Austria)	Sarah Zadrazil	33	EU	2020	127	4	2026	
26	MF	(Scotland)	Samantha Kerr	27	Non-EU	2023	17	0	2026	
27	MF	(Italy)	Arianna Caruso	26	EU	2025	0	0	2025	
31	MF	(England)	Georgia Stanway	27	Non-EU	2022	68	17	2026	
Forwards
9	FW	(Serbia)	Jovana Damnjanović	31	Non-EU	2017	139	55	2027	
11	FW	(Germany)	Lea Schüller	28	EU	2020	130	80	2026	
17	FW	(Germany)	Klara Bühl	25	EU	2020	121	33	2027	
20	FW	(Germany)	Franziska Kett	21	EU	2020	38	2	2027	
21	FW	(Denmark)	Pernille Harder	33	EU	2023	24	13	2026	
24	FW	(Poland)	Weronika Zawistowska	26	EU	2023	0	0	2025	

- Last updated: 26 August 2024
- Source: FCBayern.de, DFB.de
- Ordered by squad number.
- Notes: Flags indicate national team as defined under FIFA eligibility rules. Players may hold more than one non-FIFA nationality.
  Appearances and goals scored for FC Bayern Munich II not included.

=== Contract renewals ===
No.	Pos.	Nat.	Name	Date	Until	Source
2	DF	(Sweden)	Linda Sembrant	19 May 2024	2025	
–	man.	(Norway)	Alexander Straus	21 May 2024	2026	
23	MF	(Iceland)	Karólína Lea Vilhjálmsdóttir	19 June 2024	2026	
7	DF	(Germany)	Giulia Gwinn	8 July 2024	2027	
9	FW	(Serbia)	Jovana Damnjanović	13 August 2024	2027	
1	GK	(Germany)	Maria Luisa Grohs	16 November 2024	2026	
20	FW	(Germany)	Franziska Kett	21 December 2024	2027	
17	FW	(Germany)	Klara Bühl	11 March 2025	2027	
14	MF	(Germany)	Alara Şehitler	12 March 2025	2027	
30	DF	(Germany)	Carolin Simon	24 March 2025	2026	

== Transfers ==
=== In ===
No.	Pos.	Nat.	Player	Moving from	Type	Fee	Source
Summer
8	MF	(Germany)	Lena Oberdorf	(Germany) VfL Wolfsburg	Transfer	undisclosed	
2	DF	(Sweden)	Linda Sembrant	(Italy) Juventus	Transfer	undisclosed	
35	DF	(Germany)	Julia Landenberger	(Germany) RB Leipzig	Loan return		
32	GK	(Germany)	Ena Mahmutovic	(Germany) MSV Duisburg	Transfer	undisclosed	
–	DF	(Norway)	Emilie Bragstad	(Germany) Bayer Leverkusen	Loan return		
–	FW	(Poland)	Natalia Padilla	(Germany) 1. FC Köln	Loan return		
16	MF	(Sweden)	Julia Zigiotti Olme	(England) Brighton & Hove Albion	Transfer	undisclosed	
22	DF	(France)	Magou Doucouré	(France) Lille	Transfer	free	
Winter
18	MF	(Japan)	Momoko Tanikawa	(Sweden) FC Rosengård	Loan return		
28	DF	(Germany)	Michelle Ulbrich	(Germany) Werder Bremen	Loan		
27	MF	(Italy)	Arianna Caruso	(Italy) Juventus	Loan		

=== Out ===
No.	Pos.	Nat.	Player	Moving to	Type	Fee	Source
Summer
2	DF	(Sweden)	Linda Sembrant	(Italy) Juventus	Loan return		
35	DF	(Germany)	Julia Landenberger	(Germany) RB Leipzig	Transfer	undisclosed	
–	DF	(Norway)	Emilie Bragstad	(Germany) Bayer Leverkusen	Transfer	undisclosed	
18	MF	(Netherlands)	Jill Baijings	(England) Aston Villa	Loan		
44	GK	(Iceland)	Cecilía Rán Rúnarsdóttir	(Italy) Inter Milan	Loan		
–	FW	(Poland)	Natalia Padilla	(Spain) Sevilla	Loan		
3	DF	(France)	Inès Belloumou	(England) West Ham United	Transfer	undisclosed	
Winter
15	DF	(Colombia)	Ana María Guzmán	(United States) Utah Royals	Loan		
26	MF	(Scotland)	Sam Kerr	(England) Liverpool	Loan		

== Pre-season and friendlies ==
Win Draw Loss Fixtures

1 August 2024 Friendly	Bayern Munich	5–2	St. Gallen	Munich
13:00 CEST (UTC+2)	Şehitler 34'; Stanway 39'; Harder 59', 75'; Damnjanović 61'	Report	Colombo 47'; Nilsson 81'	Stadium: FC Bayern Campus; Attendance: 0 (Note: Played behind closed doors.)

7 August 2024 Friendly	Bayern Munich	3–0	FC Ingolstadt	Munich
19:00 CEST (UTC+2)	Simon 23'; Şehitler 29'; Damnjanović 68'	Report		Stadium: FC Bayern Campus; Attendance: 0

10 August 2024 Friendly	Bayern Munich	7–0	Slavia Prague	Ruderting
14:00 CEST (UTC+2)	Damnjanović 6', 10'; Dallmann 21'; Şehitler 63', 87', 88'; Kett 90'	Report		Stadium: Sportanlage Ruderting; Attendance: 1,500

20 August 2024 Friendly	Bayern Munich	0–0	Juventus	Unterhaching
18:00 CEST (UTC+2)		Report		Stadium: Sportpark Unterhaching; Attendance: 3,624; Referee: Marina Bachmann

== Competitions ==
=== Overview ===
Competition	First match	Last match	Starting round	Final position	Record							
Competition	First match	Last match	Starting round	Final position	Pld	W	D	L	GF	GA	GD	Win %
Bundesliga	30 August 2024	11 May 2025	Matchday 1	Winners	22	19	2	1	56	13	+43	86.36
DFB-Pokal	8 September 2024	1 May 2025	2nd round	Winners	5	5	0	0	19	6	+13	100.00
DFB-Supercup	25 August 2024		Final	Winners	1	1	0	0	1	0	+1	100.00
UEFA Champions League	9 October 2024	26 March 2025	Group stage	Quarter-finals	8	4	1	3	18	12	+6	50.00
Total					36	29	3	4	94	31	+63	80.56

Source: Competitions

=== DFB-Supercup ===
25 August 2024 Final	Bayern Munich	1–0	VfL Wolfsburg	Dresden
18:15 CEST (UTC+2)	Bühl 9'	Report		Stadium: Rudolf-Harbig-Stadion; Attendance: 16,690; Referee: Fabienne Michel

=== Bundesliga ===
==== Standings ====
Pos	Team	Pld	W	D	L	GF	GA	GD	Pts	Qualification or relegation
1	Bayern Munich (C)	22	19	2	1	56	13	+43	59	Qualification for Champions League league phase
2	VfL Wolfsburg	22	16	3	3	57	18	+39	51	Qualification for Champions League league phase
3	Eintracht Frankfurt	22	16	2	4	68	22	+46	50	Qualification for Champions League third qualifying round
4	Bayer Leverkusen	22	13	4	5	38	21	+17	43	
5	SC Freiburg	22	11	5	6	34	31	+3	38	

Source: DFB
Rules for classification: 1) Points; 2) Goal difference; 3) Goals scored; 4) Head-to-head results; 5) Head-to-head away goals scored; 6) Away goals scored; 7) Play-off.
(C) Champions

==== Result summary ====
Overall								Home						Away					
Pld	W	D	L	GF	GA	GD	Pts	W	D	L	GF	GA	GD	W	D	L	GF	GA	GD
22	19	2	1	56	13	+43	59	10	1	0	32	6	+26	9	1	1	24	7	+17

Source: DFB

==== Matchdays ====
Matchday	1	2	3	4	5	6	7	8	9	10	11	12	13	14	15	16	17	18	19	20	21	22
Ground	A	H	H	A	H	A	A	H	A	H	A	H	A	A	H	A	H	H	A	H	A	H
Result	W	W	W	W	W	L	W	D	D	W	W	W	W	W	W	W	W	W	W	W	W	W
Position	1	1	1	1	1	2	1	1	3	3	2	2	2	2	1	1	1	1	1	1	1	1
Points	3	6	9	12	15	15	18	19	20	23	26	29	32	35	38	41	44	47	50	53	56	59

Source: DFB
A = Away; H = Home; W = Win; D = Draw; L = Loss

==== Results ====
30 August 2024 1	Turbine Potsdam	0–2	Bayern Munich	Potsdam
17:00 CEST (UTC+2)	Cramer (yellow card) 13'; Bernhardt (yellow card) 83'	Report	Sembrant 22', 85'	Stadium: Karl-Liebknecht-Stadion; Attendance: 6,106; Referee: Franziska Wildfeuer

13 September 2024 2	Bayern Munich	6–2	RB Leipzig	Munich
18:30 CEST (UTC+2)	Sembrant (yellow card) 20' (yellow-red card) 74'; Dallmann 44', (yellow card) 64', Stanway 45+4'; Bühl 55', 68'; Schüller 73', 89'	Report	Fudalla 3', 76' (pen.); Joly (yellow card) 37'	Stadium: FC Bayern Campus; Attendance: 2,500; Referee: Riem Hussein

23 September 2024 3	Bayern Munich	5–1	TSG Hoffenheim	Munich
18:00 CEST (UTC+2)	Stanway 42' (pen.); Harder 45+1', 57', 88'; Simon (yellow card) 72'; Lohmann 90+3'	Report	Cerci 28'; Doorn (yellow card) 73'	Stadium: FC Bayern Campus; Attendance: 2,500; Referee: Davina Lutz

29 September 2024 4	Werder Bremen	0–4	Bayern Munich	Bremen
14:00 CEST (UTC+2)	Mahmoud (yellow card) 35'	Report	Viggósdóttir (yellow card) 21' (yellow-red card) 51'; Schüller 26'; Stanway 71'; Damnjanović (yellow card) 78'; Grohs (yellow card) 83'; Harder 85'; Damnjanović 86'	Stadium: Weserstadion Platz 11; Attendance: 2,650; Referee: Naemi Breier

5 October 2024 5	Bayern Munich	1–0	1. FC Köln	Munich
14:00 CEST (UTC+2)	Bühl 71'; Stanway (yellow card) 85'	Report	Achcińska (yellow card) 25'; Hechler (yellow card) 33'; Vogt (yellow card) 90+2'	Stadium: FC Bayern Campus; Attendance: 2,500; Referee: Fabienne Michel

12 October 2024 6	VfL Wolfsburg	2–0	Bayern Munich	Wolfsburg
17:45 CEST (UTC+2)	Endemann 5'; Beerensteyn 67'; Jónsdóttir (yellow card) 90+4'	Report	Hansen (yellow card) 20'; Sembrant (yellow card) 77'	Stadium: Volkswagen Arena; Attendance: 17,152; Referee: Franziska Wildfeuer

20 October 2024 7	Bayer Leverkusen	2–3	Bayern Munich	Leverkusen
18:30 CEST (UTC+2)	Kramer 20'; Mickenhagen 51', (yellow card) 61' (yellow-red card) 73'	Report	Zadrazil 50'; Viggósdóttir (yellow card) 57'; Stanway 66' (pen.); Şehitler 90'	Stadium: Ulrich-Haberland-Stadion; Attendance: 2,399; Referee: Angelika Söder

4 November 2024 8	Bayern Munich	1–1	Eintracht Frankfurt	Munich
18:00 CET (UTC+1)	Harder 34'	Report	Anyomi 68'; Kleinherne (yellow card) 80'	Stadium: FC Bayern Campus; Attendance: 2,500; Referee: Riem Hussein

8 November 2024 9	SC Freiburg	2–2	Bayern Munich	Freiburg
18:30 CET (UTC+1)	Karl 16'; Zicai 30'; Vobian (yellow card) 72'	Report	Şehitler 50'; Weronika Zawistowska 90+1'	Stadium: Dreisamstadion; Referee: Nadine Westerhoff

17 November 2024 10	Bayern Munich	5–0	Carl Zeiss Jena	Munich
14:00 CET (UTC+1)	Viggósdóttir 19'; Bühl 29'; Schüller 81', 90+4'; Damnjanović 82'	Report	Juckel (yellow card) 64'; Reuter (yellow card) 75'	Stadium: FC Bayern Campus; Attendance: 2,500; Referee: Karoline Wacker

7 December 2024 11	SGS Essen	0–2	Bayern Munich	Essen
14:00 CET (UTC+1)	Potsi (yellow card) 9'; Maier (yellow card) 22'	Report	Harder 30'; Zigiotti Olme (yellow card) 68'; Dallmann (yellow card) 81'; Stanway (yellow card) 85', (goal) 90+3'; Damnjanović (yellow card) 90+1'	Stadium: Stadion an der Hafenstraße; Attendance: 3,411; Referee: Franziska Wildfeuer

15 December 2024 12	Bayern Munich	2–0	Turbine Potsdam	Munich
14:00 CET (UTC+1)	Simon 29', 51'; Zigiotti (yellow card) 79'	Report	Limani (yellow card) 63'	Stadium: FC Bayern Campus; Attendance: 2,500; Referee: Anna-Lena Heidenreich

2 February 2025 13	RB Leipzig	0–1	Bayern Munich	Leipzig
18:30 CET (UTC+1)	Joly (red card) 90+2'	Report	Eriksson 11'; Zigiotti (yellow card) 76'	Stadium: RB-Trainingszentrum Cottaweg; Attendance: 2,015; Referee: Davina Lutz

9 February 2025 14	TSG Hoffenheim	1–3	Bayern Munich	Sinsheim
14:00 CET (UTC+1)	Grabowska 25'; Dongus (yellow card) 48'; Diehm (yellow card) 90+2'	Report	Bühl 34'; Damnjanović (yellow card) 51'; Şehitler 71'; Harder 90'	Stadium: Dietmar-Hopp-Stadion; Attendance: 2,829; Referee: Fabienne Michel

16 February 2025 15	Bayern Munich	1–0	Werder Bremen	Munich
15:15 CET (UTC+1)	Harder 16'	Report	Arfaoui (yellow card) 86'	Stadium: FC Bayern Campus; Attendance: 2,500; Referee: Miriam Schwermer

9 March 2025 16	1. FC Köln	0–3	Bayern Munich	Cologne
14:00 CET (UTC+1)	Wiankowska (yellow card) 73'	Report	Simon 8'; Harder 31'; Lohmann 55'	Stadium: RheinEnergieStadion; Attendance: 35,711; Referee: Karoline Wacker

14 March 2025 17	Bayern Munich	3–1	VfL Wolfsburg	Munich
16:55 CET (UTC+1)	Harder 13', 47'; Lohmann (yellow card) 16'; Zadrazil (yellow card) 54'; Schüller 69'	Report	Popp (yellow card) 16'; Lattwein (yellow card) 51'; Jónsdóttir (yellow card) 71'; Beerensteyn 75'	Stadium: FC Bayern Campus; Attendance: 2,500; Referee: Fabienne Michel

30 March 2025 18	Bayern Munich	2–0	Bayer Leverkusen	Munich
15:15 CEST (UTC+2)	Bühl 56'; Schüller 68'; Gwinn (yellow card) 72'	Report	Kögel (yellow card) 80'	Stadium: FC Bayern Campus; Attendance: 2,500; Referee: Riem Hussein

12 April 2025 19	Eintracht Frankfurt	0–3	Bayern Munich	Frankfurt am Main
14:00 CEST (UTC+2)		Report	Schüller 12'; Bühl 29'; Harder 48'	Stadium: Deutsche Bank Park; Attendance: 30,500; Referee: Karoline Wacker

27 April 2025 20	Bayern Munich	3–1	SC Freiburg	Munich
14:00 CEST (UTC+2)	Schüller 21'; Harder 67'; Viggósdóttir 79'; Damnjanović (yellow card) 83'	Report	Fölmli 28'	Stadium: FC Bayern Campus; Attendance: 2,500; Referee: Sina Diekmann

5 May 2025 21	Carl Zeiss Jena	0–1	Bayern Munich	Jena
18:00 CEST (UTC+2)		Report	Ulbrich 89'	Stadium: Ernst-Abbe-Sportfeld; Attendance: 2,729; Referee: Selina Menzel

11 May 2025 22	Bayern Munich	3–0	SGS Essen	Munich
14:00 CEST (UTC+2)	Schüller 36', 64'; Harder 45'	Report		Stadium: FC Bayern Campus; Attendance: 2,500; Referee: Davina Lutz

=== DFB-Pokal ===
8 September 2024 Second round	SC Sand	0–6	Bayern Munich	Willstätt
14:00 CEST (UTC+2)		Report	Damnjanović 6'; Kerr (yellow card) 23'; Stanway 25'; Dallmann 58'; Gwinn 69'; Olme 72'; Schüller 89'	Stadium: Adams Arena; Attendance: 2,378; Referee: Selina Menzel

24 November 2024 Round of 16	SC Freiburg	1–2	Bayern Munich	Freiburg
16:00 CET (UTC+1)	Zicai 62'	Report	Felde 27' (o.g.); Schüller 55'	Stadium: Dreisamstadion; Attendance: 7,755; Referee: Davina Lutz

12 February 2025 Quarter-final	Bayern Munich	4–1 (a.e.t.)	Eintracht Frankfurt	Munich
18:30 CET (UTC+1)	Eriksson (yellow card) 45'; Zadrazil (yellow card) 45+1'; Lohmann (yellow card) 85'; Damnjanović 90', 109'; Viggósdóttir 93'; Zigiotti Olme (yellow card) 98'; Tanikawa 104'	Report	Lührßen (yellow card) 10'; Gräwe (yellow card) 70'; Anyomie (yellow card) 76'; Simon 80' (o.g.); Doorsoun (yellow card) 104'	Stadium: FC Bayern Campus; Attendance: 2,500; Referee: Franziska Wildfeuer

22 March 2025 Semi-final	Bayern Munich	3–2	TSG Hoffenheim	Munich
14:00 CET (UTC+1)	Harder 35', 40' (pen.), 53'; Kett (yellow card) 89'	Report	Diehm (yellow card) 6'; Memeti 14', (yellow card) 61'; Delacauw 24'; Janssens (yellow card) 31'; Cazalla (yellow card) 44'; Doorn (yellow card) 90+5'	Stadium: FC Bayern Campus; Attendance: 2,500; Referee: Miriam Schwermer

1 May 2025 Final	Bayern Munich	4–2	Werder Bremen	Cologne
16:00 CEST (UTC+2)	Schüller 6', 65', 79'; Simon 30', (yellow card) 37'; Viggósdóttir (yellow card) 51'; Damnjanović (yellow card) 71'	Report	Dieckmann 45+2'; Mühlhaus (yellow card) 61', (goal) 90+4'	Stadium: RheinEnergieStadion; Attendance: 45,146; Referee: Annika Kost

=== UEFA Champions League ===
==== Group stage ====
Pos	Team	Pld	W	D	L	GF	GA	GD	Pts	Qualification	ARS	BAY	JUV	VÅL
1	(England) Arsenal	6	5	0	1	17	9	+8	15	Advance to quarter-finals	—	3–2	1–0	4–1
2	(Germany) Bayern Munich	6	4	1	1	17	6	+11	13	Advance to quarter-finals	5–2	—	4–0	3–0
3	(Italy) Juventus	6	2	0	4	4	11	−7	6		0–4	0–2	—	3–0
4	(Norway) Vålerenga	6	0	1	5	3	15	−12	1		1–3	1–1	0–1	—

Source: UEFA
Rules for classification: Group stage tiebreakers

===== Results =====
9 October 2024 1	Bayern Munich (Germany)	5–2	(England) Arsenal	Munich
18:45 CEST (UTC+2)	Viggósdóttir 43'; Lohmann 56'; Harder 73', 78', 86'	Report	Caldentey 30'; Codina (yellow card) 41', (goal) 65'	Stadium: FC Bayern Campus; Attendance: 2,500; Referee: Lina Lehtovaara (Finland)

16 October 2024 2	Juventus (Italy)	0–2	(Germany) Bayern Munich	Biella
18:45 CEST (UTC+2)	Bennison (yellow card) 22'; Girelli (yellow card) 90+3'	Report	Dallmann 17'; Harder 73'	Stadium: Stadio La Marmora-Pozzo; Attendance: 956; Referee: Ivana Projkovska (North Macedonia)

12 November 2024 3	Bayern Munich (Germany)	3–0	(Norway) Vålerenga	Munich
21:00 CET (UTC+1)	Harder 10'; Gwinn 17' (pen.); Zadrazil 90+2'	Report	Tennebø (yellow card) 40'; Thomsen (yellow card) 66'	Stadium: FC Bayern Campus; Attendance: 2,500; Referee: Alina Peşu (Romania)

21 November 2024 4	Vålerenga (Norway)	1–1	(Germany) Bayern Munich	Oslo
18:45 CET (UTC+1)	Thorsnes 88'	Report	Stanway (yellow card) 31'; Damnjanović 75', (yellow card) 84'	Stadium: Intility Arena; Attendance: 2,314; Referee: Goga Kikacheishvili (Georgia)

12 December 2024 5	Bayern Munich (Germany)	4–0	(Italy) Juventus	Munich
18:45 CET (UTC+1)	Damnjanović 22'; Harder 52'; Bühl 73'; Şehitler 82'	Report		Stadium: FC Bayern Campus; Attendance: 2,500; Referee: Stéphanie Frappart (France)

18 December 2024 6	Arsenal (England)	3–2	(Germany) Bayern Munich	Borehamwood
21:00 CET (UTC+1)	Viggósdóttir 7' (o.g.); Russo 59'; Foord (yellow card) 74'; Caldentey 86' (pen.); McCabe (yellow card) 90'	Report	Eriksson 39', 58'; Stanway (yellow card) 67'; Schüller (yellow card) 87'	Stadium: Meadow Park; Attendance: 3,385; Referee: Tess Olofsson (Sweden)
Note: Due to a scheduling conflict with an EFL Cup match involving Arsenal's men's team, the match was moved from the Emirates Stadium to Meadow Park in Borehamwood.

==== Knockout phase ====
===== Quarter-finals =====
18 March 2025 First leg	Bayern Munich (Germany)	0–2	(France) Lyon	Munich
21:00 CET (UTC+1)	Zadrazil (yellow card) 45+5'	Report	Chawinga 35'; Dumornay 65'	Stadium: FC Bayern Campus; Attendance: 2,500; Referee: Olatz Rivera Olmedo (Spain)

26 March 2025 Second leg	Lyon (France)	4–1	(Germany) Bayern Munich	Décines-Charpieu
18:45 CET (UTC+1)	Dumornay 46'; Diani 54'; Chawinga 60'; Hegerberg 90+4'	Report	Bühl 33'; Simon (yellow card) 52'; Hansen (yellow card) 87'	Stadium: Parc Olympique Lyonnais; Attendance: 13,947; Referee: Iuliana Elena Demetrescu (Romania)

== Statistics ==
=== Summary ===
As of 11 May 2025

No.	Pos.	Nat.	Player	Bundesliga		DFB-Pokal		DFB-Supercup		Champions League		Total		Discipline		Notes
No.	Pos.	Nat.	Player	Apps	Goals	Apps	Goals	Apps	Goals	Apps	Goals	Apps	Goals	Yellow card	Red card	Notes
Goalkeepers
1	GK	(Germany)	Maria Luisa Grohs	10	0	1	0	1	0	5	0	17	0	0	0	
32	GK	(Germany)	Ena Mahmutovic	12	0	4	0	0	0	3	0	19	0	0	0	
41	GK	(Germany)	Anna Wellmann	0	0	0	0	0	0	0	0	0	0	0	0	
Defenders
2	DF	(Sweden)	Linda Sembrant	11	2	1	0	0	0	6	0	18	2	0	0	
4	DF	(Iceland)	Glódís Perla Viggósdóttir	18	2	4	1	1	0	6	1	29	4	0	0	
5	DF	(Sweden)	Magdalena Eriksson	11	1	4	0	1	0	4	2	20	3	0	0	
6	DF	(Norway)	Tuva Hansen	20	0	4	0	1	0	8	0	33	0	0	0	
7	DF	(Germany)	Giulia Gwinn	19	0	4	1	1	0	8	1	32	2	0	0	
13	DF	(Brazil)	Tainara	0	0	0	0	0	0	0	0	0	0	0	0	
15	DF	(Colombia)	Ana María Guzmán	2	0	0	0	0	0	0	0	2	0	0	0	
19	DF	(Austria)	Katharina Naschenweng	0	0	0	0	0	0	0	0	0	0	0	0	
22	DF	(France)	Magou Doucouré	0	0	0	0	0	0	1	0	1	0	0	0	
28	DF	(Germany)	Michelle Ulbrich	4	1	2	0	0	0	0	0	6	1	0	0	
30	DF	(Germany)	Carolin Simon	22	3	5	1	1	0	6	0	34	4	0	0	
--	DF	(Germany)	Luzie Zähringer	0	0	1	0	0	0	0	0	1	0	0	0	
Midfielders
8	MF	(Germany)	Lena Oberdorf	0	0	0	0	0	0	0	0	0	0	0	0	
10	MF	(Germany)	Linda Dallmann	18	1	2	1	1	0	8	1	29	3	0	0	
12	MF	(Germany)	Sydney Lohmann	17	2	5	0	1	0	6	1	29	3	0	0	
14	MF	(Germany)	Alara Şehitler	16	3	2	0	0	0	5	1	23	4	0	0	
16	MF	(Sweden)	Julia Zigiotti Olme	16	0	4	1	0	0	5	0	25	1	0	0	
18	MF	(Japan)	Momoko Tanikawa	6	0	2	1	0	0	2	0	10	1	0	0	
25	MF	(Austria)	Sarah Zadrazil	17	1	4	0	1	0	7	1	29	2	0	0	
26	MF	(Scotland)	Samantha Kerr	8	0	1	0	0	0	2	0	11	0	0	0	
27	MF	(Italy)	Arianna Caruso	7	0	2	0	0	0	2	0	11	0	0	0	
31	MF	(England)	Georgia Stanway	12	5	2	1	1	0	6	0	21	6	0	0	
Forwards
9	FW	(Serbia)	Jovana Damnjanović	17	2	5	3	1	0	6	2	29	7	0	0	
11	FW	(Germany)	Lea Schüller	22	11	5	5	1	0	7	0	35	16	0	0	
17	FW	(Germany)	Klara Bühl	22	7	4	0	1	1	8	2	35	10	0	0	
20	FW	(Germany)	Franziska Kett	7	0	2	0	1	0	1	0	11	0	0	0	
21	FW	(Denmark)	Pernille Harder	22	14	5	3	1	0	8	6	36	23	0	0	
24	FW	(Poland)	Weronika Zawistowska	8	1	1	0	0	0	4	0	13	1	0	0	

=== Goalscorers ===
As of match played 11 May 2025

Includes all competitive matches. The list is sorted alphabetically by surname when total goals are equal.

Rank	No.	Pos.	Nat.	Player	Bundesliga	DFB-Pokal	DFB-Supercup	Champions League	Total
1	21	FW	(Denmark)	Pernille Harder	14	3	0	6	23
2	11	FW	(Germany)	Lea Schüller	11	5	0	0	16
3	17	FW	(Germany)	Klara Bühl	7	0	1	2	10
4	9	FW	(Serbia)	Jovana Damnjanović	2	3	0	2	7
5	31	MF	(England)	Georgia Stanway	5	1	0	0	6
6	14	MF	(Germany)	Alara Şehitler	3	0	0	1	4
6	30	DF	(Germany)	Carolin Simon	3	1	0	0	4
6	4	DF	(Iceland)	Glódís Perla Viggósdóttir	2	1	0	1	4
9	10	MF	(Germany)	Linda Dallmann	1	1	0	1	3
9	5	DF	(Sweden)	Magdalena Eriksson	1	0	0	2	3
9	12	MF	(Germany)	Sydney Lohmann	2	0	0	1	3
12	7	DF	(Germany)	Giulia Gwinn	0	1	0	1	2
12	2	DF	(Sweden)	Linda Sembrant	2	0	0	0	2
12	25	MF	(Austria)	Sarah Zadrazil	1	0	0	1	2
15	18	FW	(Japan)	Momoko Tanikawa	0	1	0	0	1
15	28	FW	(Germany)	Michelle Ulbrich	1	0	0	0	1
15	24	FW	(Poland)	Weronika Zawistowska	1	0	0	0	1
15	16	MF	(Sweden)	Julia Zigiotti Olme	0	1	0	0	1
Own goals (from the opponents)					0	1	0	0	1
Totals					56	19	1	18	94

==== Hat-tricks ====
Player	Against	Minutes	Score after goals	Result	Date	Competition	Ref
(Denmark) Pernille Harder	TSG Hoffenheim (H)	45, 57, 88	2–1, 3–1, 4–1	5–1	23 September 2024	Bundesliga	
(Denmark) Pernille Harder	Arsenal (H)	73, 78, 86	3–2, 4–2, 5–2	5–2	9 October 2024	Champions League	
(Denmark) Pernille Harder	TSG Hoffenheim (H)	35, 40, 53	1–2, 2–2, 3–2	3–2	22 March 2025	DFB-Pokal	
(Germany) Lea Schüller	Werder Bremen (N)	6, 65, 79	1–0, 3–1, 4–1	4–2	1 May 2025	DFB-Pokal	

(H) – Home; (A) – Away; (N) – Neutral venue (final)

=== Clean sheets ===
As of 11 May 2025

Rank	No.	Pos.	Nat.	Player	Bundesliga	DFB-Pokal	DFB-Supercup	Champions League	Total
1	1	GK	(Germany)	Maria Luisa Grohs	5	1	1	2	9
1	32	GK	(Germany)	Ena Mahmutovic	8	0	0	1	9
Totals					13	1	1	3	18

=== Disciplinary record ===
As of 5 February 2025

No.	Pos.	Nat.	Player	Bundesliga			DFB-Pokal			DFB-Supercup			Champions League			Total		
No.	Pos.	Nat.	Player	Booked	(yellow card) (yellow-red card)	Sent off (straight red)	Booked	(yellow card) (yellow-red card)	Sent off (straight red)	Booked	(yellow card) (yellow-red card)	Sent off (straight red)	Booked	(yellow card) (yellow-red card)	Sent off (straight red)	Booked	(yellow card) (yellow-red card)	Sent off (straight red)
1	GK	(Germany)	Maria Luisa Grohs	1	0	0	0	0	0	0	0	0	0	0	0	1	0	0
2	DF	(Sweden)	Linda Sembrant	1	1	0	0	0	0	0	0	0	0	0	0	1	1	0
4	DF	(Iceland)	Glódís Perla Viggósdóttir	1	1	0	0	0	0	0	0	0	0	0	0	1	1	0
6	DF	(Norway)	Tuva Hansen	1	0	0	0	0	0	0	0	0	0	0	0	1	0	0
9	FW	(Serbia)	Jovana Damnjanović	2	0	0	0	0	0	0	0	0	1	0	0	3	0	0
10	MF	(Germany)	Linda Dallmann	2	0	0	0	0	0	0	0	0	0	0	0	2	0	0
11	FW	(Germany)	Lea Schüller	0	0	0	0	0	0	0	0	0	1	0	0	1	0	0
16	MF	(Sweden)	Julia Zigiotti Olme	3	0	0	0	0	0	0	0	0	0	0	0	3	0	0
26	MF	(Scotland)	Sam Kerr	0	0	0	0	0	0	1	0	0	0	0	0	1	0	0
30	DF	(Germany)	Carolin Simon	1	0	0	0	0	0	0	0	0	0	0	0	1	0	0
31	MF	(England)	Georgia Stanway	2	0	0	0	0	0	0	0	0	2	0	0	4	0	0
Totals				14	2	0	0	0	0	1	0	0	4	0	0	19	2	0
