= Franziska Kett =

German footballer (born 2004)

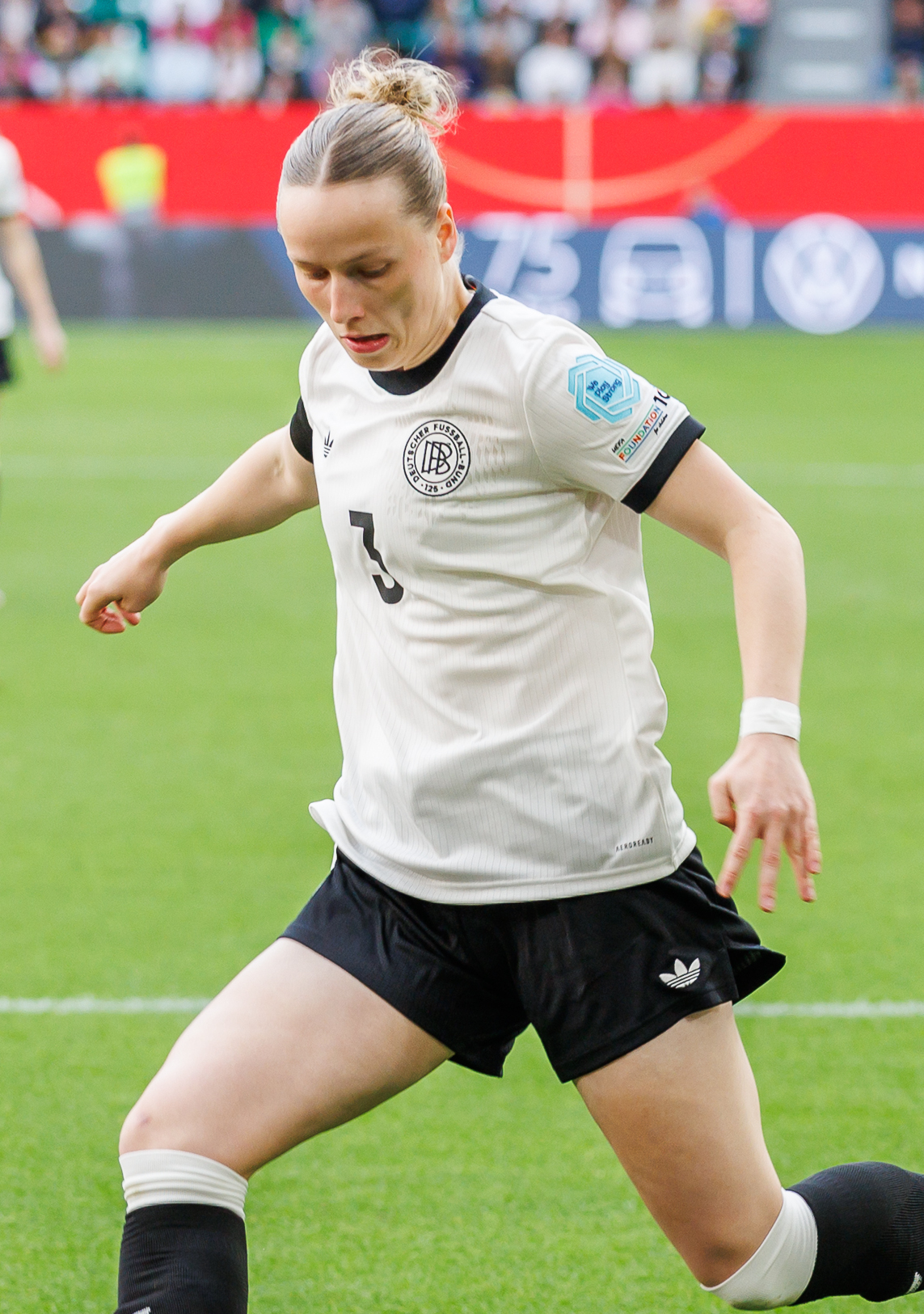
- Kett with Germany in 2025

Personal information
- Date of birth: 24 October 2004 (age 22)
- Place of birth: Deggendorf, Germany
- Height: 1.71 m (5 ft 7 in)
- Position: Left-back

Team information
- Current team: Bayern Munich
- Number: 20

Youth career
- –2020: SpVgg Grün-Weiss Deggendorf
- 2020–2021: Bayern Munich

Senior career*
| Years | Team | Apps | (Gls) |
| 2021–2025 | Bayern Munich II | 21 | (9) |
| 2022– | Bayern Munich | 56 | (4) |

International career^{‡}
| 2017–2018 | Germany U15 | 8 | (7) |
| 2020 | Germany U17 | 2 | (0) |
| 2022–2023 | Germany U19 | 15 | (6) |
| 2024– | Germany U20 | 2 | (0) |
| 2025– | Germany | 15 | (0) |
Medal record
Women's football
Representing Germany
UEFA Women's Under-19 Championship
| Runner-up | 2023 Belgium |
- * Club domestic league appearances and goals as of 6 November 2026 ‡ National team caps and goals as of 21:05, 13 October 2026 (UTC)

Franziska Kett (born 24 October 2004) is a German professional footballer who plays as a left-back for Frauen-Bundesliga club Bayern Munich and the Germany women's national team.

== Club career ==
Kett began playing football at FC Edenstetten in the Lower Bavarian district of Deggendorf at the age of four. She was later part of SpVgg Grün-Weiß Deggendorf up to the U15 age group before being signed by Bayern Munich for the 2020–21 season for their U17 youth team. Before she was promoted to the second team in the following season, she played for them on 6 June 2021 (matchday 18) in the 2–1 defeat against Eintracht Frankfurt II; on the last day of the pre-season, she came in for Annika Wohner in the 77th minute. In the 2021–22 season she already played 15 league games in which she scored six goals; she scored her first on 26 September 2021 (matchday 5) in a 4–1 win in the home game against the second team of VfL Wolfsburg with the goal to make it 1–0 in the 22nd minute.

In March 2022, she signed her first professional contract with Bayern Munich. She made her first-team Bundesliga debut on 25 September 2022 in a 3–0 win in the home game against Werder Bremen, substituting for Carolin Simon in the 84th minute. She also made her debut on 29 September 2022 in the second leg of the second qualifying round to participate in the 2022–23 Champions League in a 3–1 win over Real Sociedad San Sebastián as a late substitute. Kett scored her first Bundesliga goal on 30 October 2022 in a 3–1 win in the home game against SV Meppen. During the season, Kett played a total of 21 matches in the Bundesliga and Champions League, scoring twice and assisting four times as Bayern won the league.

The following season, Kett played eight matches in the league and four in the Champions League before suffering a muscular injury that prematurely ended her campaign. Bayern once again won the Bundesliga title. During Kett's comeback, which came during Bayern's 1-0 win over Wolfsburg in the 2024 DFB-Supercup, she suffered an ankle joint injury on her left leg. Kett extended her Bayern contract until 2027 in December 2024. She returned to action against Werder Bremen in February 2025 and played in seven league matches, only starting her final game versus Jena.

== International career ==
Kett was a player in the Bavarian Football Association’s select team in the competition for the national cup in their age groups U14, U16 and U18 from 2017 to 2019 in a total of 14 games, in which she scored six goals; her first on her debut on 25 May 2017 in Duisburg in a 1–1 draw against the national team of the Westphalia Football and Athletics Association. Kett made her international debut for the U15 national team during a lfriendly against the United States U15; she scored Germany's consolation goal in a 6–1 loss. She made eight appearances in this age group, in which she scored seven goals. Two years later, she was used in two international matches by the U17 national team. Kett played 15 times for Germany's U19 team, before sustaining a season-ending (2022/23) injury against Norway in April 2023. She returned to action during the 2023 UEFA Under-19 Championship, where she scored the extra time winner against France in the semi-final. In recognition of her performances, Kett was given the Fritz Walter Medal for players born in 2004.

In March 2025, Kett was called up to the Germany first team for the first time by coach Christian Wück. She started her first game during a 4–0 win against Scotland. After a total of three senior appearances, Kett was called up for the UEFA Euro 2025 as part of Wück's 23-player squad. She made her tournament debut in the quarter-final, starring defensively as Germany won on penalties despite suffering a red card in the 13th minute. Kett also played in the semi-final versus Spain, a match which Germany lost 0–1 in extra time.

== Playing style ==
Having originally played as a forward, Kett moved to the left back position in 2025. She described herself as "a nasty player" with strong offensive capabilities and good tackling. The latter attribute was praised in her Euros debut against France, where Kett staved off the pressure from Kadidiatou Diani and neutralised Delphine Cascarino in particular.

== Career statistics ==
=== Club ===
As of match played 19 November 2026

Appearances and goals by club, season and competition
| Club | Season | League | | | DFB-Pokal | | Continental | | Other | | Total | |
| Club | Season | Division | Apps | Goals | Apps | Goals | Apps | Goals | Apps | Goals | Apps | Goals |
|---|---|---|---|---|---|---|---|---|---|---|---|---|
| Bayern Munich II | 2020–21 | 2. Frauen-Bundesliga | 1 | 0 | — | | — | | — | | 1 | 0 |
| Bayern Munich II | 2021–22 | 2. Frauen-Bundesliga | 15 | 6 | — | | — | | — | | 15 | 6 |
| Bayern Munich II | 2022–23 | 2. Frauen-Bundesliga | 3 | 2 | — | | — | | — | | 3 | 2 |
| Bayern Munich II | 2023–24 | 2. Frauen-Bundesliga | 1 | 1 | — | | — | | — | | 1 | 1 |
| Bayern Munich II | 2024–25 | 2. Frauen-Bundesliga | 1 | 0 | — | | — | | — | | 1 | 0 |
| Bayern Munich II | Total | | 21 | 9 | — | | — | | — | | 21 | 9 |
| Bayern Munich | 2022–23 | Frauen-Bundesliga | 13 | 2 | 2 | 0 | 8 (Note: Appearance(s) in UEFA Champions League) | 0 | — | | 23 | 2 |
| Bayern Munich | 2023–24 | Frauen-Bundesliga | 8 | 0 | 2 | 0 | 4 | 0 | — | | 14 | 0 |
| Bayern Munich | 2024–25 | Frauen-Bundesliga | 7 | 0 | 2 | 0 | 1 | 0 | 1 (Note: Appearance in DFB-Supercup) | 0 | 11 | 0 |
| Bayern Munich | 2025–26 | Frauen-Bundesliga | 22 | 2 | 3 | 1 | 9 | 1 | 1 | 0 | 35 | 4 |
| Bayern Munich | 2026–27 | Frauen-Bundesliga | 6 | 0 | 2 | 0 | 5 | 1 | 0 | 0 | 13 | 1 |
| Bayern Munich | Total | | 56 | 4 | 11 | 1 | 27 | 2 | 2 | 0 | 96 | 7 |
| Career total | | | 77 | 13 | 11 | 1 | 27 | 2 | 2 | 0 | 117 | 16 |

=== International ===
As of 13 October 2026

Appearances and goals by national team and year
| National team | Year | Apps | Goals |
|---|---|---|---|
Germany
| Germany | 2025 | 9 | 0 |
| Germany | 2026 | 6 | 0 |
| Total | | 15 | 0 |

== Honours ==
Bayern Munich

- Bundesliga: 2022–23, 2023–24, 2024–25, 2025–26
- DFB-Pokal: 2024–25, 2025–26
- DFB-Supercup: 2024, 2025

Germany U19

- UEFA Women's Under-19 Championship runner-up: 2023

Individual

- Fritz Walter Medal U19 Gold: 2023
- UEFA Women's Under-19 Championship Team of the Tournament: 2023
- UEFA Women's Championship Team of the Tournament: 2025

== Education ==
Kett attended Gymnasium München Nord, where she graduated in 2025.
