= Ena Mahmutovic =

German association football player (born 2003)

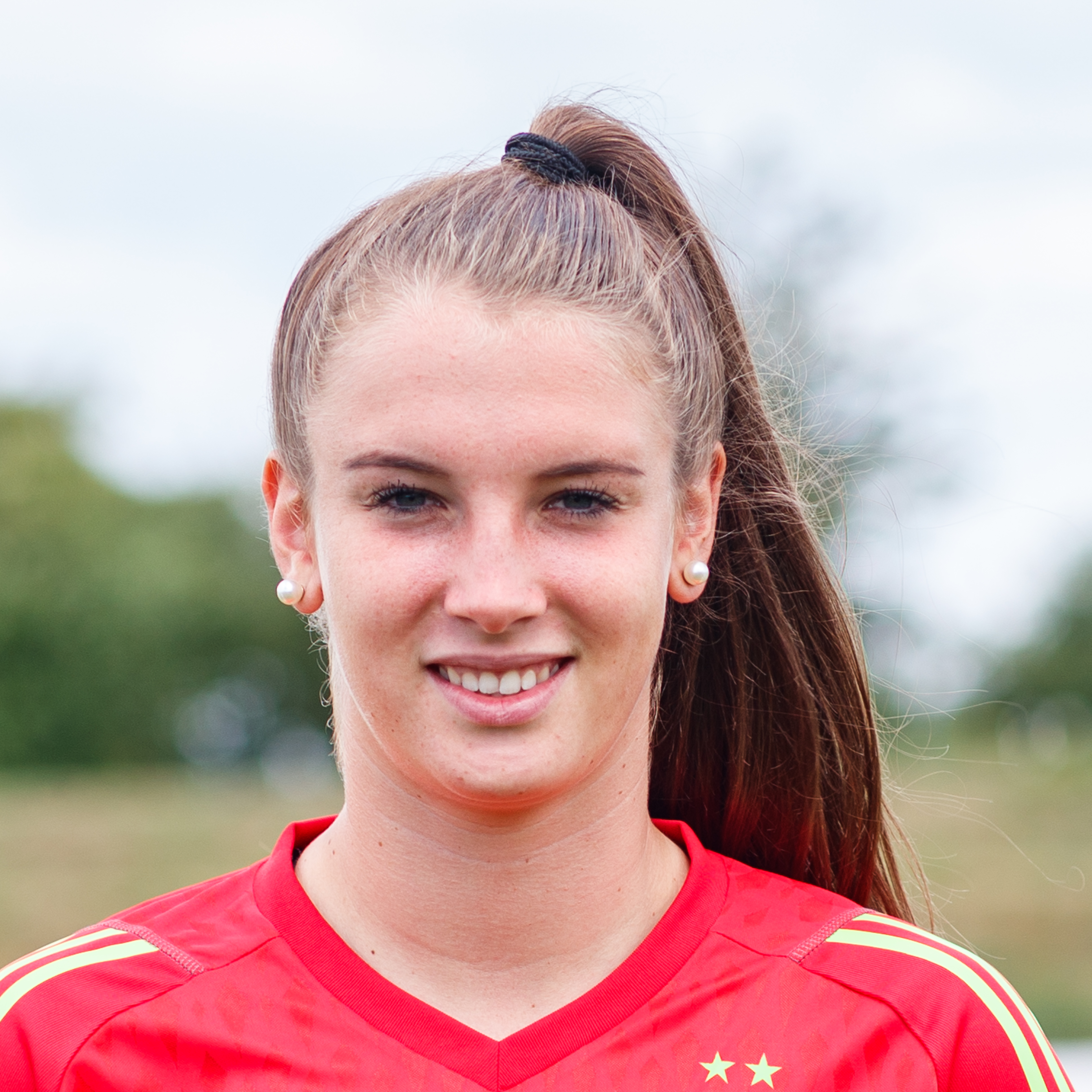
- Mahmutovic in 2023

Personal information
- Date of birth: 23 December 2003 (age 22)
- Place of birth: Duisburg, Germany
- Height: 1.77 m (5 ft 10 in)
- Position: Goalkeeper

Team information
- Current team: Bayern Munich
- Number: 1

Youth career
- –2013: Eintracht Duisburg
- 2014–2019: MSV Duisburg

Senior career*
| Years | Team | Apps | (Gls) |
| 2019–2024 | MSV Duisburg | 56 | (0) |
| 2024– | Bayern Munich II | 3 | (0) |
| 2024– | Bayern Munich | 38 | (0) |

International career^{‡}
| 2024– | Germany U-23 | 1 | (0) |
| 2024– | Germany | 4 | (0) |
- * Club domestic league appearances and goals as of 14 November 2026 ‡ National team caps and goals as of 13 October 2026

Ena Mahmutovic (Bosnian: [ˈɛna maxmuˈtɔʋitɕ]; born 23 December 2003) is a German footballer who plays as a goalkeeper for Bayern Munich in the Bundesliga and the Germany national team.

== Club career ==
=== Youth teams ===
Mahmutovic, born and raised in Duisburg, Germany, from Bosniak parents, began playing football as a goalkeeper at Eintracht Duisburg before moving to the youth team at MSV Duisburg. Belonging to the B youth team, she was used from 1 October 2016 to 21 May 2017 in 14 league games of the B-Juniorinnen-Niederrheinliga. From 10 September to 18 November 2017 she played eight more league games in this league. During this period, she came on 23 September 2017 for the first time in the B-Junior Bundesligato the mission, to which she was able to add six more by 28 April 2018.

=== Duisburg first team ===
At the start of the 2019–20 season, she was promoted to the first team, for which she made her competitive debut on 30 May 2020 (matchday 17). In the Bundesliga away game with Bayer Leverkusen, she came on as a field player for Meret Günster in the 90th minute of the 2–0 win. In the following season she already played four league games, including the last three of the season. After relegation, she played eight league games in the 2nd Bundesliga, from which she returned to the Bundesliga with her team in second place. During this division, she also made her debut in the DFB-Pokal. On 27 September 2021 she lost 3–1 in the second round to VfL Wolfsburg.

During 2022–23, Mahmutovic became Duisburg's starting goalkeeper, playing in 21 league games and keeping six clean sheets despite a tenth-placed finish. Mahmutovic was recognised as one of the leagues best goalkeepers, with match-deciding performances such as during a 1–0 win over SV Meppen which secured crucial points to prevent Duisburg's relegation. She was voted Duisburg's player of the season by the club's fans. On 3 November 2023, it was announced she had been elected Duisburg's Athlete of the Year 2023. The 2023–24 season became a disaster for Duisburg, which got relegated after scoring just four points amidst financial troubles. In spite of this, Mahmutovic remained a key player, playing every match and making the most saves out of every goalkeeper in the division.

=== Success at Bayern ===
Her performances were recognised by Bayern Munich, whom she joined in the summer with a contract dated until 2027. Having made her league debut for the team in a 1-1 draw versus Frankfurt, Mahmutovic soon usurped Maria Luisa Grohs to become Bayern's main keeper; she played in twelve league matches and kept a clean sheet on eight occasions. Praised for her strong reflexes, Mahmutovic notched a league-best 87.5% save percentage. She also made her Champions League debut versus Vålerenga, where she made numerous close-quarter saves. Bayern won the league and DFB-Pokal double, with Mahmutovic playing against Werder Bremen in the final.

== International career ==
As a player in the U18 selection team of the Lower Rhine Football Association, she played in three matches for the state cup from 3 to 6 October 2019 at the Wedau sports school.

She was part of the 21-player squad for the U20 national team for the 2022 World Cup tournament in Costa Rica, but was not used. Her team was eliminated from the tournament after the group B preliminary round.

In 2023 Mahmutovic took part in the DFB training camp in Marbella and was selected for the international match against the Sweden national team on 21 February 2023 in Duisburg's Schauinsland Reisen Arena – the first test in the World Cup year. She was first nominated for the senior national team by national coach Martina Voss-Tecklenburg.

Mahmutovic made her senior debut against Italy, where her dribbling attempt whilst being pressed led to Italy scoring the 2–1 winner.

On 12 June 2025, Mahmutovic was called up to the Germany squad for the UEFA Women's Euro 2025.

== Career statistics ==
=== Club ===
As of match played 19 November 2026:

Appearances and goals by club, season and competition
| Club | Season | League | | | National Cup | | Continental | | Other | | Total | |
| Club | Season | Division | Apps | Goals | Apps | Goals | Apps | Goals | Apps | Goals | Apps | Goals |
|---|---|---|---|---|---|---|---|---|---|---|---|---|
| MSV Duisburg | 2019–20 | Frauen-Bundesliga | 1 | 0 | — | | — | | – | | 1 | 0 |
| MSV Duisburg | 2020–21 | Frauen-Bundesliga | 4 | 0 | — | | — | | – | | 4 | 0 |
| MSV Duisburg | 2021–22 | Frauen-Bundesliga | 8 | 0 | 1 | 0 | — | | – | | 9 | 0 |
| MSV Duisburg | 2022–23 | Frauen-Bundesliga | 21 | 0 | 2 | 0 | — | | – | | 23 | 0 |
| MSV Duisburg | 2023–24 | Frauen-Bundesliga | 21 | 0 | 3 | 0 | — | | – | | 24 | 0 |
| MSV Duisburg | Total | | 55 | 0 | 6 | 0 | 0 | 0 | 0 | 0 | 61 | 0 |
| Bayern Munich | 2024–25 | Frauen-Bundesliga | 12 | 0 | 4 | 0 | 3 (Note: Appearances in UEFA Women's Champions League) | 0 | – | | 19 | 0 |
| Bayern Munich | 2025–26 | Frauen-Bundesliga | 17 | 0 | 5 | 0 | 8 | 0 | 1 (Note: Appearances in DFB-Supercup) | 0 | 31 | 0 |
| Bayern Munich | 2026–27 | Frauen-Bundesliga | 9 | 0 | 1 | 0 | 5 | 0 | 1 | 0 | 16 | 0 |
| Total | | | 37 | 0 | 10 | 0 | 16 | 0 | 2 | 0 | 65 | 0 |
| Bayern Munich II | 2024–25 | 2. Frauen-Bundesliga | 3 | 0 | — | | — | | – | | 3 | 0 |
| Career Total | | | 94 | 0 | 16 | 0 | 16 | 0 | 1 | 0 | 127 | 0 |

=== International ===
As of 13 October 2026

Appearances and goals by national team and year
| National team | Year | Apps | Goals |
|---|---|---|---|
| Germany | 2024 | 1 | 0 |
| Germany | 2026 | 3 | 0 |
| Total | | 4 | 0 |

== Honours ==
Bayern Munich

- Bundesliga: 2024–25, 2025–26
- DFB-Pokal: 2024–25, 2025–26
- DFB-Supercup Frauen: 2025, 2026
