= Sydney Lohmann =

German footballer (born 2000)

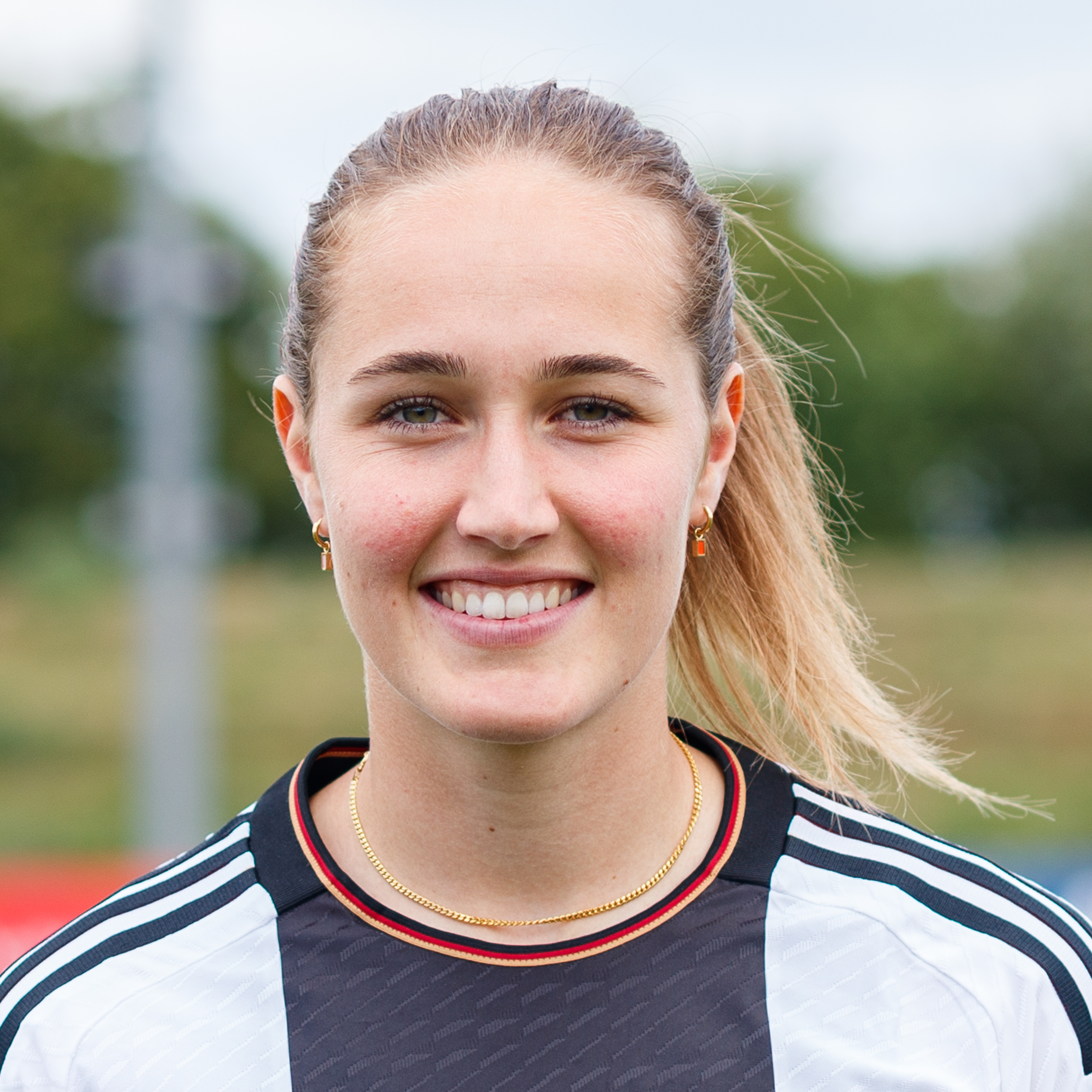
- Lohmann at the national team in 2023

Personal information
- Full name: Sydney Matilda Lohmann
- Date of birth: 19 June 2000 (age 26)
- Place of birth: Bad Honnef, Germany
- Height: 1.76 m (5 ft 9 in)
- Position: Midfielder

Team information
- Current team: Manchester City
- Number: 22

Youth career
- SV Lengenfeld
- VfL Kaufering
- –2016: SC Fürstenfeldbruck
- 2016: Bayern Munich

Senior career*
Years	Team	Apps	(Gls)
2016–2018	Bayern Munich II	14	(3)
2017–2025	Bayern Munich	119	(23)
2025–	Manchester City	11	(0)

International career^{‡}
2014–2015	Germany U15	6	(4)
2015–2016	Germany U16	7	(0)
2016–2017	Germany U17	16	(1)
2017–2019	Germany U19	10	(0)
2018–	Germany	44	(6)
Medal record
Olympic Games
Bronze medal – third place	2024 Paris	Team
UEFA Women's Championship
Silver medal – second place	2022 England
UEFA Women's Nations League
Bronze medal – third place	2024 France–Netherlands–Spain
- * Club domestic league appearances and goals as of 22:45, 25 October 2026 (UTC) ‡ National team caps and goals as of 17:56, 31 October 2025 (UTC)

Sydney Matilda Lohmann (German pronunciation: [ˈloːman]; born 19 June 2000) is a German professional footballer who plays as a central midfielder for Women's Super League club Manchester City and the Germany national team.

== Club career ==
=== Youth career & Bayern Munich II ===
Lohmann grew up in Pürgen in Upper Bavaria. In her childhood, she first played for SV Lengenfeld and then for VfL Kaufering, both in the district of Landsberg am Lech.

From the youth team at SC Fürstenfeldbruck, Lohmann joined FC Bayern Munich's under-17 team ahead of the 2016–17 season. For the B youth team, she played six league games in the junior Bundesliga and scored two goals. Lohmann's debut on 17 September 2016 (1st matchday) in a 3–1 home win against 1. FC Nürnberg's B youth team was crowned with her first goal; a 20th minute penalty to make it 2–0.

At the same time, Lohmann was already playing for Bayern II in the 2. Frauen-Bundesliga Süd. She made her debut on 28 August 2016 (1st matchday) in a 1–0 away win against 1. FC Saarbrücken. On 19 February 2017 (12th matchday), Lohmann scored her first goal for Bayern II in the reverse match against Saarbrücken, putting her side 2–1 ahead in the 88th minute of an eventual 3–1 home win.

=== Bayern Munich ===
Lohmann's progression saw her begin to play for Bayern Munich's first team. She made her Frauen-Bundesliga debut on 19 March 2017 (matchday 14) in a 2–0 loss away to VfL Wolfsburg. She scored her first Bundesliga goal on 5 November 2017 (matchday 7) in the 29th minute of a 3–1 home victory over MSV Duisburg, putting Bayern 2–1 ahead. She made her UEFA Women's Champions League debut during the 2018–19 season.

On 4 October 2020 (4th matchday), Lohmann's 90th minute penalty at SGS Essen to make it 2–0 saw her score the 1000th goal for a Bayern team in the Bundesliga. A month later, she extended her contract with Munich through to 2024. Sydney scored her first Champions League goal on 10 December 2020 in a 3–1 win at Ajax. She impressively scored ten goals in 20 league matches to help Bayern win the 2020–21 Frauen-Bundesliga, the club's first title since 2015–16.

On 16 March 2024, Sydney signed a contract extension to stay at Bayern until June 2026. The attacking midfielder was part of the Bayern side which went a record-breaking 44 matches unbeaten in the Frauen-Bundesliga from December 2021 to October 2024. Along the way, Lohmann won the 2022–23 and 2023–24 league titles respectively with Die Frauen, as well as the 2024 DFB-Supercup Frauen.

=== Manchester City ===
On 9 July 2025, it was announced that midfielder Lohmann had signed for Manchester City joining the English Women's Super League club on a three-year deal from Bayern Munich. Upon signing she said "I've always had the thought to playing abroad at some point in my career and I just had the feeling that this year was the right time to do that."

== International career ==
Lohmann made her debut in the national jersey of the DFB in the U15 national team on 28 October 2014, which won 13–0 in Glasgow against the host team. She scored her first two international goals two days later at the same place in an 8–0 win in the second game against the Scotland U15 national team.

She was capped seven times on the U16 national team, making her debut on 29 June 2015 in a 2–1 win over Norway in the Nordic Cup tournament in Denmark.

Her first cap for the U17 national team occurred on 19 March 2016 in a 2–0 win over Switzerland. On this team, she took part in the European Championship in Belarus from 4 to 16 May 2016. The team won the tournament, with Lohmann playing two group games on 4 and 7 May against Spain and Italy, which ended 2–2 and 0–0, respectively.

She debuted for the U19 national team on 3 April 2018 in Senec in an 8–0 victory over Slovakia in the second-round qualifier of Group 2 for the 2018 European Championship in Switzerland.

She made her debut for the senior national team on 10 November 2018 in Osnabrück in a 5–2 win in a friendly against Italy, coming on for Lina Magull in the 71st minute. She scored her first international goal on 22 September 2020 in the seventh European Championship qualifier in Group I in a 3–0 win against Montenegro, scoring the final goal in the 59th minute.

National coach Martina Voss-Tecklenburg included her in the squad for the 2022 European Championship in England. The German team reached the final where they fell to the English national team, with Lohmann playing in four games.

Lohmann was called up to the Germany squad for the 2023 FIFA Women's World Cup and made one appearance at the tournament.

On 3 July 2024, Lohmann was called up to the Germany squad for the 2024 Summer Olympics. She played in five of Germany's six matches at the tournament and helped the team win a bronze medal in the Olympic women's football event in Paris. Germany beat world champions Spain 1–0 in Lyon in the Bronze medal match.

On 12 June 2025, Lohmann was called up to the Germany squad for the UEFA Women's Euro 2025.

== Career statistics ==
=== Club ===
As of match played 18 November 2026

Appearances and goals by club, season and competition
Club	Season	League			National Cup (Note: Includes DFB-Pokal, Women's FA Cup)		League Cup (Note: Includes Women's League Cup)		Continental (Note: Includes UEFA Women's Champions League)		Other (Note: Includes DFB-Supercup)		Total	
Club	Season	Division	Apps	Goals	Apps	Goals	Apps	Goals	Apps	Goals	Apps	Goals	Apps	Goals
Bayern Munich II	2016–17	2. Frauen-Bundesliga	6	1	—		—		—		—		6	1
Bayern Munich II	2017–18	2. Frauen-Bundesliga	8	2	—		—		—		—		8	2
Bayern Munich II	Total		14	3	0	0	0	0	0	0	0	0	14	3
Bayern Munich	2016–17	Frauen-Bundesliga	4	0	0	0	—		0	0	—		4	0
Bayern Munich	2017–18	Frauen-Bundesliga	1	1	0	0	—		0	0	—		1	1
Bayern Munich	2018–19	Frauen-Bundesliga	21	3	4	1	—		3	0	—		28	4
Bayern Munich	2019–20	Frauen-Bundesliga	13	0	1	0	—		3	0	—		17	0
Bayern Munich	2020–21	Frauen-Bundesliga	20	10	1	1	—		6	4	—		27	15
Bayern Munich	2021–22	Frauen-Bundesliga	8	1	2	0	—		2	0	—		12	1
Bayern Munich	2022–23	Frauen-Bundesliga	17	5	2	0	—		9	1	—		28	6
Bayern Munich	2023–24	Frauen-Bundesliga	18	1	4	1	—		6	1	—		28	3
Bayern Munich	2024–25	Frauen-Bundesliga	17	2	5	0	—		6	1	1	0	29	3
Bayern Munich	Total		119	23	19	3	0	0	35	7	1	0	174	33
Manchester City	2025–26	Women's Super League	10	0	3	0	2	0	—		—		15	0
Manchester City	2026–27	Women's Super League	1	0	0	0	—		3	0	—		4	0
Manchester City	Total		11	0	3	0	2	0	3	0	0	0	19	0
Career total			144	26	22	3	2	0	38	7	1	0	207	36

=== International ===
As of match played 28 October 2025

Appearances and goals by national team and year
National team	Year	Apps	Goals
Germany	2018	1	0
Germany	2020	4	1
Germany	2021	6	0
Germany	2022	8	2
Germany	2023	7	1
Germany	2024	10	0
Germany	2025	8	2
Total		44	6

Scores and results list Germany's goal tally first, score column indicates score after each Lohmann goal.

List of international goals scored by Sydney Lohmann
No.	Date	Venue	Opponent	Score	Result	Competition
1	22 September 2020	Podgorica, Montenegro	Montenegro	3–0	3–0	UEFA Women's Euro 2021 qualifying
2	24 June 2022	Erfurt, Germany	Switzerland	7–0	7–0	Friendly
3	6 September 2022	Plovdiv, Bulgaria	Bulgaria	5–0	8–0	2023 FIFA Women's World Cup qualification
4	7 April 2023	Sittard, Netherlands	Netherlands	1–0	1–0	Friendly
5	3 June 2025	Vienna, Austria	Austria	1–0	6–0	2025 UEFA Women's Nations League
6	3 June 2025	Vienna, Austria	Austria	5–0	6–0	2025 UEFA Women's Nations League

== Honours ==
Bayern Munich

- Bundesliga: 2020–21, 2022–23, 2023–24, 2024–25
- DFB-Pokal: 2024–25
- DFB-Supercup: 2024
- German B Junior Champion: 2017

Manchester City

- Women's Super League: 2025–26
- Women's FA Cup: 2025–26

Germany U17

- U17 European Championship: 2016, 2017

Germany U19

- U19 European Championship runner-up: 2018

Germany

- Summer Olympics bronze medal: 2024
- UEFA Women's Championship runner-up: 2022
- UEFA Women's Nations League third place: 2023–24

Individual

- Silbernes Lorbeerblatt: 2024
