= Tuva Hansen =

Norwegian footballer (born 1997)

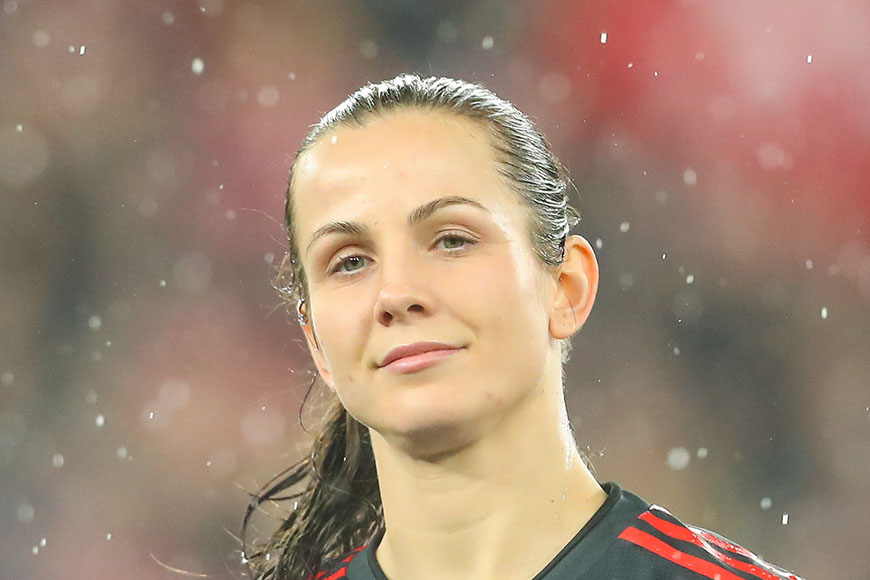
- Hansen with Bayern Munich in 2023

Personal information
- Date of birth: 4 August 1997 (age 29)
- Place of birth: Bryne, Norway
- Height: 1.65 m (5 ft 5 in)
- Position: Defender

Team information
- Current team: West Ham United
- Number: 5

Youth career
- 2012: Bryne
- 2013: Klepp

Senior career*
Years	Team	Apps	(Gls)
2013	Klepp	8	(0)
2014	Arna-Bjørnar	10	(0)
2015–2020	Klepp	127	(2)
2021–2022	Brann	42	(2)
2023–2026	Bayern Munich	52	(0)
2026–	West Ham United	8	(0)

International career^{‡}
2011–2012	Norway U15	6	(1)
2012–2013	Norway U16	14	(2)
2013–2014	Norway U17	10	(3)
2014–2016	Norway U19	32	(2)
2015–2019	Norway U23	13	(0)
2017–	Norway	62	(2)
- * Club domestic league appearances and goals as of 15:22, 25 May 2026 (UTC) ‡ National team caps and goals as of 17:39, 1 May 2026 (UTC)

Tuva Hansen (born 4 August 1997) is a Norwegian professional footballer who plays as a defender for Women's Super League club West Ham United and the Norway national team.

== Club career ==
=== Early career ===
Hansen started her senior career in Klepp after having played in Bryne. She debuted in Toppserien in 2013, when she played for Klepp. In 2014, she played for Arna-Bjørnar. In the club, she played together with her older sister Hege Hansen.

=== Klepp ===
In November 2014, both Tuva and her sister Hege Hansen announced that they moved back to Klepp. In 2015, Tuva played all of the matches for Klepp in Toppserien, and she was nominated for Statoil’s young talent prize. She grew on the experience and became a solid defender. Upon the appointment of manager Olli Harder she also became the captain of the club. In 2016, Tuva was named player of the year by Jærbladet, the local newspaper. After the 2016 season, she said no to move to LSK Kvinner, the team that won both Toppserien and the cup that year. In 2018, she was part of the Klepp team that came second, and therefore got silver, in Toppserien. And in 2019, they got bronze.

=== Sandviken/Brann ===
In November 2020, Sandviken announced that they had signed both Tuva Hansen and her teammate Elisabeth Terland from Klepp. Hansen quickly became a leader in the team and was the captain already from her first season. That season also became a success, and Sandviken won Toppserien 2021 7 November 2021, in the second last match of the season. That match was against Klepp, Hansen’s former club. Sandviken won 8-0, which meant that Klepp got relegated, something that made Hansen cry after the match in an interview with NRK. Sportskollektivet.no named Hansen player of the year 2021.

=== Bayern Munich ===
Bayern Munich announced 1 December 2022 that they had signed Hansen. She officially joined the club on 1 January 2023, after the transfer window opened. Upon leaving the Frauen Bundesliga club in January 2026, Hansen had won three German championship titles, the DFB Cup and two Supercup titles, making 77 appearances in the three years that she was at the club.

=== West Ham United ===
West Ham United announced the permanent signing of Hansen on 28 January 2026, becoming Rita Guarino's fourth signing of the 2025-26 winter transfer window.

== International career ==
Hansen has played matches for several Norway youth national teams, including U15, U16, U17, U19, and U23, and also the Norway national team.

She was called up to the national team for the first time in November 2016. She debuted when she was 19 years old, in a 0-3 loss against Spain in the Algarve Cup in March 2017. Since April 2021 she has been called up regularly, including at the 2022 Algarve Cup. Hansen was part of the squad that was called up to the UEFA Women's Euro 2022. She played in all three group games until her team was knocked out. She scored her first international goal in a 1-0 win against Belgium in qualifying for the 2023 World Cup, which saw Norway qualify for the World Cup.

On 19 June 2023, she was included in the 23-player Norwegian squad for the FIFA Women's World Cup 2023.

On 16 June 2025, Hansen was called up to the Norway squad for the UEFA Women's Euro 2025.

== Personal life ==
Hansen has together with her dog, Vilja, gained much popularity on social media; among others they had over 65 million views on their TikTok profile in August 2021. As of 10 October 2021, they had 102,000 followers on Instagram and 900,000 on TikTok. Several of their videos have been seen by millions of people.

In May 2025, Hansen confirmed that she is in a relationship with Fredrik Graham Hansen, the brother of international teammate Caroline Graham Hansen.

In July 2025, she had a second operation for endometriosis.

Hansen has studied to become an occupational therapist.

Tuva Hansen is the daughter of the former footballer Hugo Hansen, and the younger sister of Cato Hansen and Hege Hansen, both of whom have also played in top leagues and national teams. Hege and Tuva have played one match together on the Norway national team. The first match Tuva played for the national team, was also the last match Hege played.

== Career statistics ==
=== Club ===
As of match played 16 May 2026

Appearances and goals by club, season and competition
Club	Season	League			National cup (Note: Includes Norwegian Women's Cup, DFB-Pokal, Women's FA Cup)		League cup (Note: Includes Women's League Cup)		Continental		Other		Total	
Club	Season	Division	Apps	Goals	Apps	Goals	Apps	Goals	Apps	Goals	Apps	Goals	Apps	Goals
Klepp	2013	Toppserien	8	0	1	0	—		—		—		9	0
Arna-Bjørnar	2014	Toppserien	10	0	2	1	—		—		—		12	1
Klepp	2015	Toppserien	22	0	2	0	—		—		—		24	0
Klepp	2016	Toppserien	22	0	1	0	—		—		—		23	0
Klepp	2017	Toppserien	22	0	3	0	—		—		—		25	0
Klepp	2018	Toppserien	22	0	4	0	—		—		—		26	0
Klepp	2019	Toppserien	22	0	2	0	—		—		—		24	0
Klepp	2020	Toppserien	17	2	1	0	—		—		—		18	2
Klepp	Total		127	2	13	0	0	0	0	0	0	0	140	2
Brann	2021	Toppserien	18	0	4	0	—		1	0	—		23	0
Brann	2022	Toppserien	24	2	5	2	—		0	0	—		29	2
Brann	Total		42	2	9	2	0	0	1	0	0	0	52	4
Bayern Munich	2022–23	Frauen-Bundesliga	12	0	2	0	—		2	0	—		16	0
Bayern Munich	2023–24	Frauen-Bundesliga	14	0	3	0	—		2	0	—		19	0
Bayern Munich	2024–25	Frauen-Bundesliga	20	0	3	0	—		8	0	1	0	32	0
Bayern Munich	2025–26	Frauen-Bundesliga	6	0	0	0	—		0	0	0	0	6	0
Bayern Munich	Total		52	0	8	0	0	0	12	0	1	0	73	0
West Ham United	2025–26	Women's Super League	8	0	1	0	0	0	—		—		9	0
Career total			247	4	34	3	0	0	13	0	1	0	295	7

=== International ===
As of match played 7 March 2026

Appearances and goals by national team and year
National team	Year	Apps	Goals
Norway	2017	2	0
Norway	2020	1	0
Norway	2021	9	0
Norway	2022	11	1
Norway	2023	13	0
Norway	2024	11	1
Norway	2025	13	0
Norway	2026	2	0
Total		62	2

Scores and results list Norway's goal tally first, score column indicates score after each Hansen goal.

List of international goals scored by Tuva Hansen
No.	Date	Venue	Opponent	Score	Result	Competition
1	2 September 2022	Den Dreef, Leuven, Belgium	Belgium	1–0	1–0	2023 FIFA Women's World Cup qualification
2	29 November 2024	Inver Park, Larne, Northern Ireland	Northern Ireland	2–0	4–0	UEFA Women's Euro 2025 qualifying play-offs

== Honours ==
Sandviken

- Toppserien: 2021, 2022
- Norwegian Women's Cup: 2022

Bayern Munich

- Frauen-Bundesliga: 2022–23, 2023–24, 2024–25
- DFB-Pokal: 2024–25
- DFB-Supercup: 2024
