= Maria Luisa Grohs =

German footballer

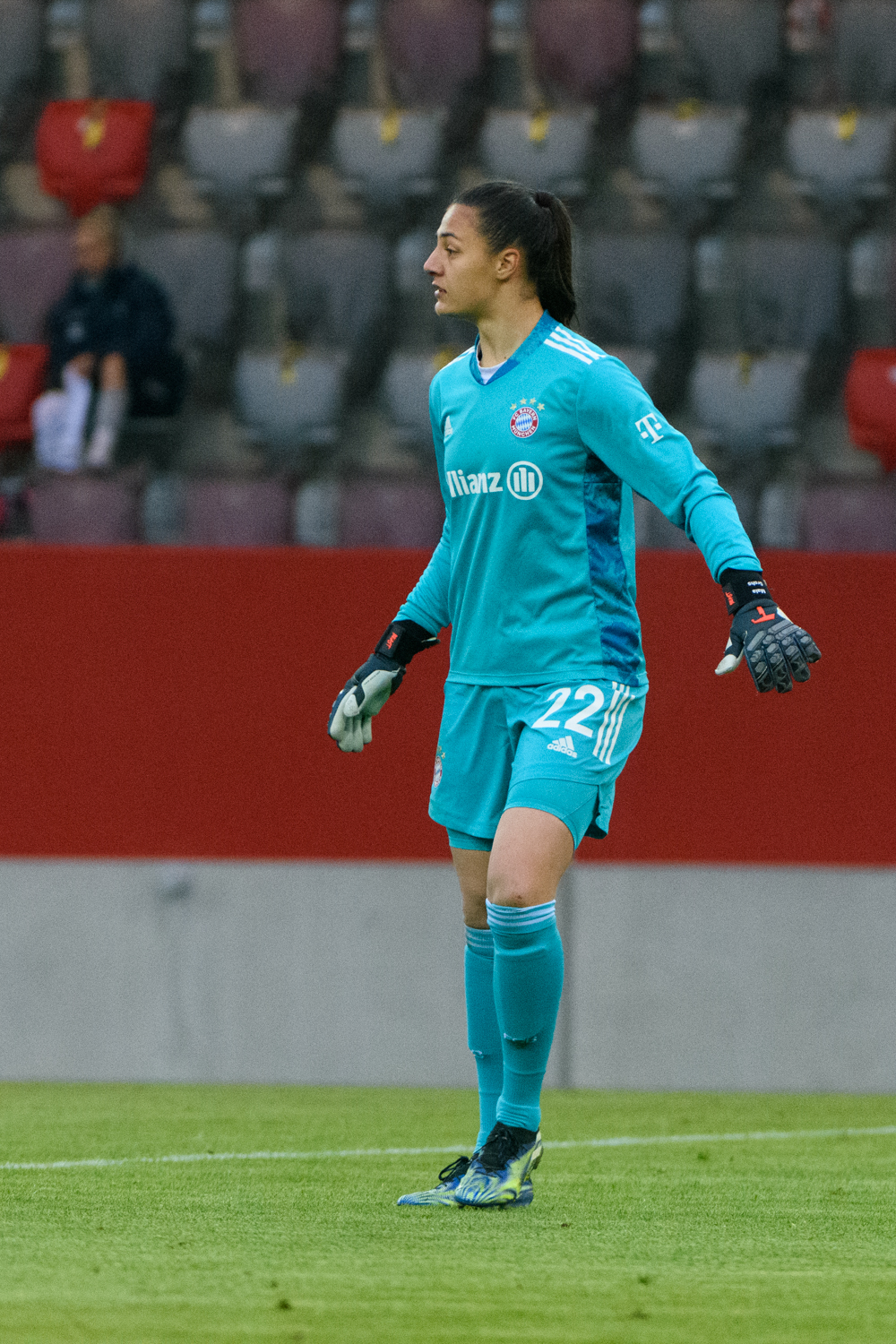
- Grohs with Bayern Munich in 2021

Personal information
- Full name: Maria Luisa Grohs
- Date of birth: 13 June 2001 (age 25)
- Place of birth: Münster, Germany
- Height: 1.80 m (5 ft 11 in)
- Position: Goalkeeper

Team information
- Current team: OL Lyonnes
- Number: 25

Youth career
- 2016: 1. FC Gievenbeck
- 2016–2019: VfL Bochum

Senior career*
Years	Team	Apps	(Gls)
2019–2025	Bayern Munich II	24	(0)
2019–2026	Bayern Munich	63	(0)
2026–	OL Lyonnes	3	(0)

International career^{‡}
2017	Germany U16	3	(0)
2017–2018	Germany U17	9	(0)
2019–2020	Germany U19	6	(0)
2025–	Germany	0	(0)
2026–	Germany U23	3	(0)
- * Club domestic league appearances and goals as of 8 November 2026 ‡ National team caps and goals as of 15 October 2026

Maria Luisa "Mala" Grohs (German pronunciation: [ˈgʁoːs]; born 13 June 2001) is a German footballer who plays as a goalkeeper for Première Ligue club OL Lyonnes and the Germany national team.

== Club career ==
=== Youth ===
As a teenager, Grohs played for local club 1. FC Gievenbeck.

In 2016, Grohs joined the youth division at VfL Bochum, where she played 17 games in the B-Juniorinnen-Bundesliga. At the end of the 2016–17 season, the team got relegated to the B-Juniorinnen-Regionalliga West. Grohs played for Bochum for the next 2 seasons.

=== Professional ===
==== Bayern Munich II ====
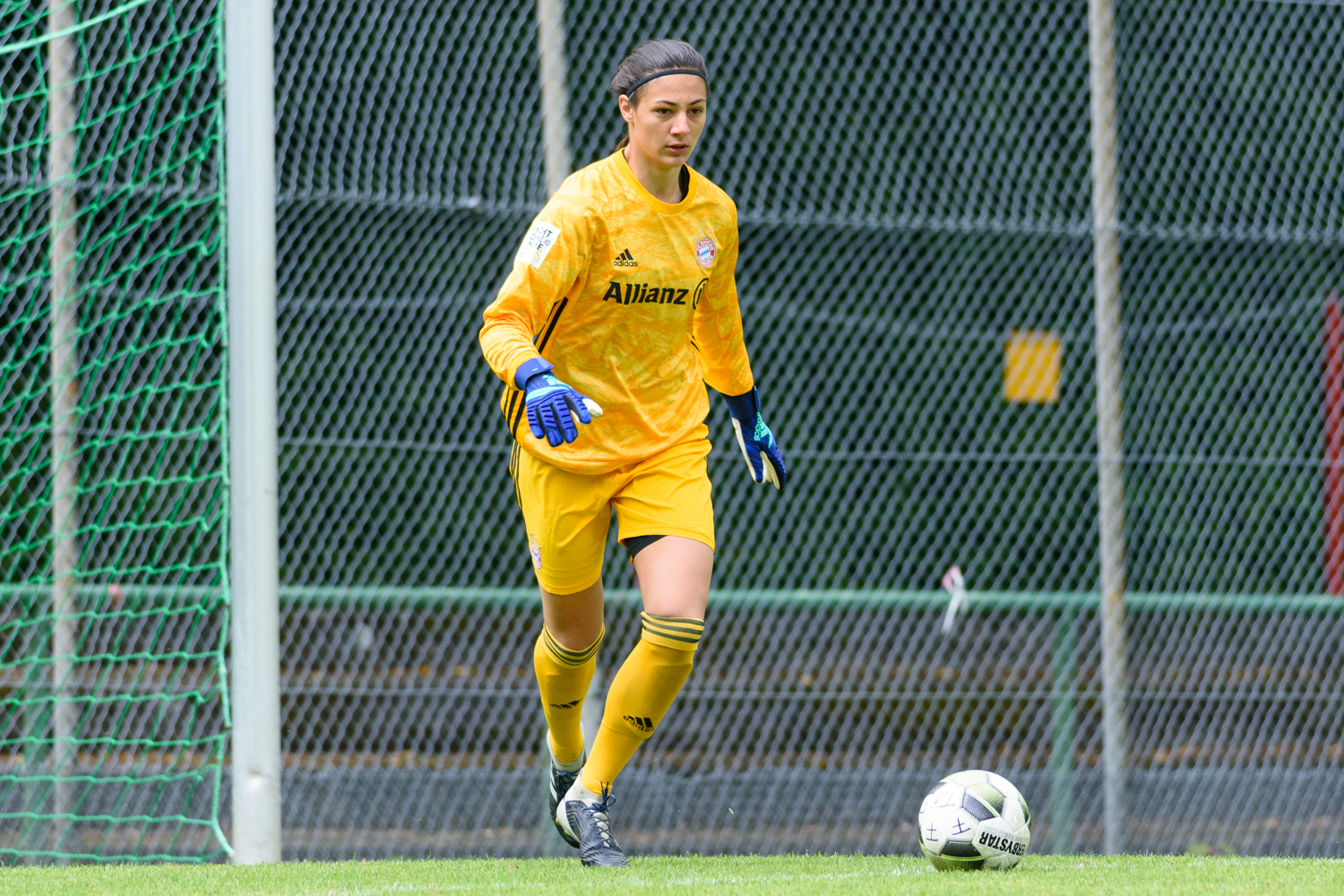
Grohs with Bayern Munich in 2019.

For the 2019–20 season, Grohs moved to Frauen-Bundesliga side Bayern Munich. At first, Grohs played for Bayern second team in the 2. Frauen-Bundesliga. She made her debut on 11 August 2019, in a win 4:1 vs Eintracht Frankfurt second team.

==== Bayern Munich ====
On 30 January 2021, Grohs made her debut for the first team, in Bayern victory 13–0 over Walddörfer SV in the DFB-Pokal round-of-16. On 17 April 2021, she made her Frauen-Bundesliga debut, in a defeat 3–2 to Hoffenheim.

At the beginning of the 2022–23 season, Grohs became the first-choice goalkeeper at Bayern, starting all the games. On 27 October 2022, in a match vs Benfica Lisbon in the group-stage of the Champions League, at a status of 2–2 in the 89th minute, Grohs saved a Benfica penalty, and minutes later Georgia Stanway scored the winner in a 3–2 win for FC Bayern. She left the club by the end of the 2025–26 season.

=== OL Lyonnes ===
On 12 June 2026, Grohs joined Première Ligue club OL Lyonnes on a one-year contract until 2027.

== International career ==
Since 2017, Grohs was a youth international for Germany on several selection levels. In addition, between 2015 and 2018, she played under the Westphalian Football and Athletics Association in the National Pokal.

On 16 February 2017, Grohs made her debut for Germany U16, in a win 2–1 over Portugal U16. 4 days later, she played in a defeat 2–0 to Netherlands U16. On 29 November 2017, she made her debut for Germany U17, in a win 4–1 vs Finland U17. From 30 August 2019 to 9 March 2020, Grohs took part in 6 games for Germany U19.

In September 2022, Grohs was called up to train with the German national team for the first time.

== Personal life ==
Grohs is studying for a bachelor's degree at the Technical University of Munich; her initial choice was Aerospace Engineering, but in the end enrolled in Mechanical Engineering. In an interview Grohs mentioned that she would have tried to get into the ESA space programme and train as an astronaut if she had not become a professional footballer. In November 2024 she published that she had been diagnosed with a malignant tumor and that she would therefore be missing from the team indefinitely. As a result, her contract was extended by another year until 2026. In December, she and FC Bayern announced that all medical measures and interventions were successful and that, ideally, she could start training again in January. She returned to team training in January 2025.

== Career statistics ==
As of match played 19 November 2026

Appearances and goals by club, season and competition
Club	Season	League			DFB-Pokal		Continental		Other		Total	
Club	Season	Division	Apps	Goals	Apps	Goals	Apps	Goals	Apps	Goals	Apps	Goals
Bayern Munich II	2019–20	2. Frauen-Bundesliga	10	0	—		—		—		10	0
Bayern Munich II	2020–21	2. Frauen-Bundesliga	3	0	—		—		—		3	0
Bayern Munich II	2021–22	2. Frauen-Bundesliga	9	0	—		—		—		9	0
Bayern Munich II	2024–25	2. Frauen-Bundesliga	2	0	—		—		—		2	0
Bayern Munich II	Total		24	0	—		—		—		24	0
Bayern Munich	2020–21	Frauen-Bundesliga	2	0	1	0	0	0	—		3	0
Bayern Munich	2022–23	Frauen-Bundesliga	21	0	4	0	10 (Note: Appearances in UEFA Women's Champions League)	0	—		35	0
Bayern Munich	2023–24	Frauen-Bundesliga	21	0	3	0	6	0	—		30	0
Bayern Munich	2024–25	Frauen-Bundesliga	10	0	1	0	5	0	1 (Note: Appearance in DFB-Supercup)	0	17	0
Bayern Munich	2025–26	Frauen-Bundesliga	9	0	0	0	2	0	—		11	0
Bayern Munich	Total		63	0	9	0	23	0	1	0	96	0
Lyon	2026–27	Première Ligue	3	0	0	0	5	0	—		8	0
Career Total			90	0	9	0	28	0	1	0	128	0

== Honours ==
Bayern Munich

- Frauen-Bundesliga: 2020–21, 2022–23, 2023–24 2024–25, 2025–26
- DFB-Pokal: 2024–25, 2025–26
- DFB-Supercup: 2024
