= Michelle Ulbrich =

German footballer (born 1996)

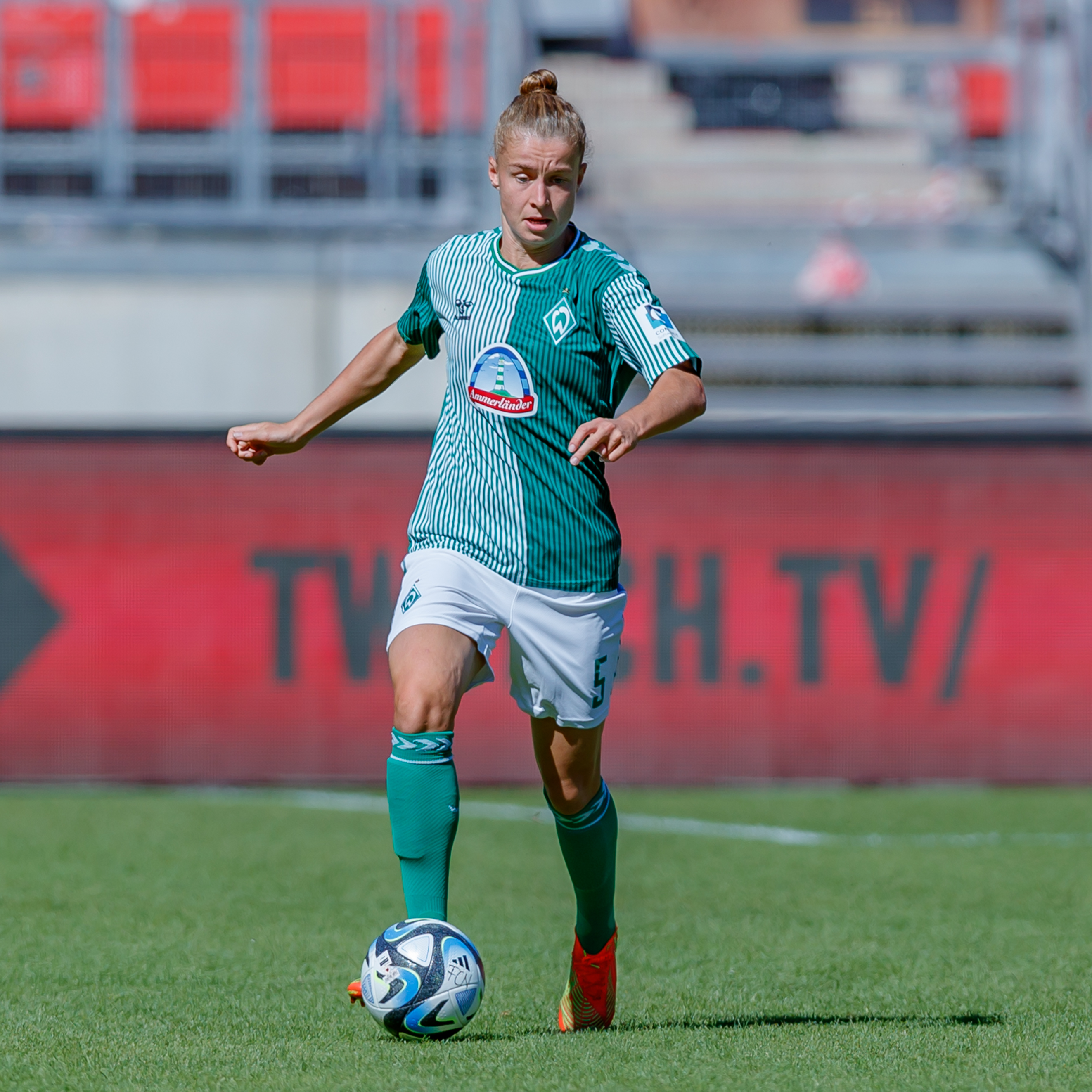
- Ulbrich with Werder Bremen in 2023

Personal information
- Date of birth: 3 November 1996 (age 30)
- Place of birth: Bremen, Germany
- Height: 1.76 m (5 ft 9 in)
- Position: Centre-back

Team information
- Current team: Werder Bremen
- Number: 5

Youth career
- BTS Neustadt
- 2012–2013: Werder Bremen

Senior career*
Years	Team	Apps	(Gls)
2012–	Werder Bremen	271	(19)
2025	→ Bayern Munich (loan)	5	(1)
- * Club domestic league appearances and goals as of 21 November 2026

Michelle Ulbrich (born 3 November 1996) is a German professional footballer who plays as a centre-back for Frauen-Bundesliga club Werder Bremen.

== Honours ==
Bayern Munich

- Bundesliga: 2024–25
- DFB-Pokal: 2024–25
