= Carolin Simon =

German footballer (born 1992)

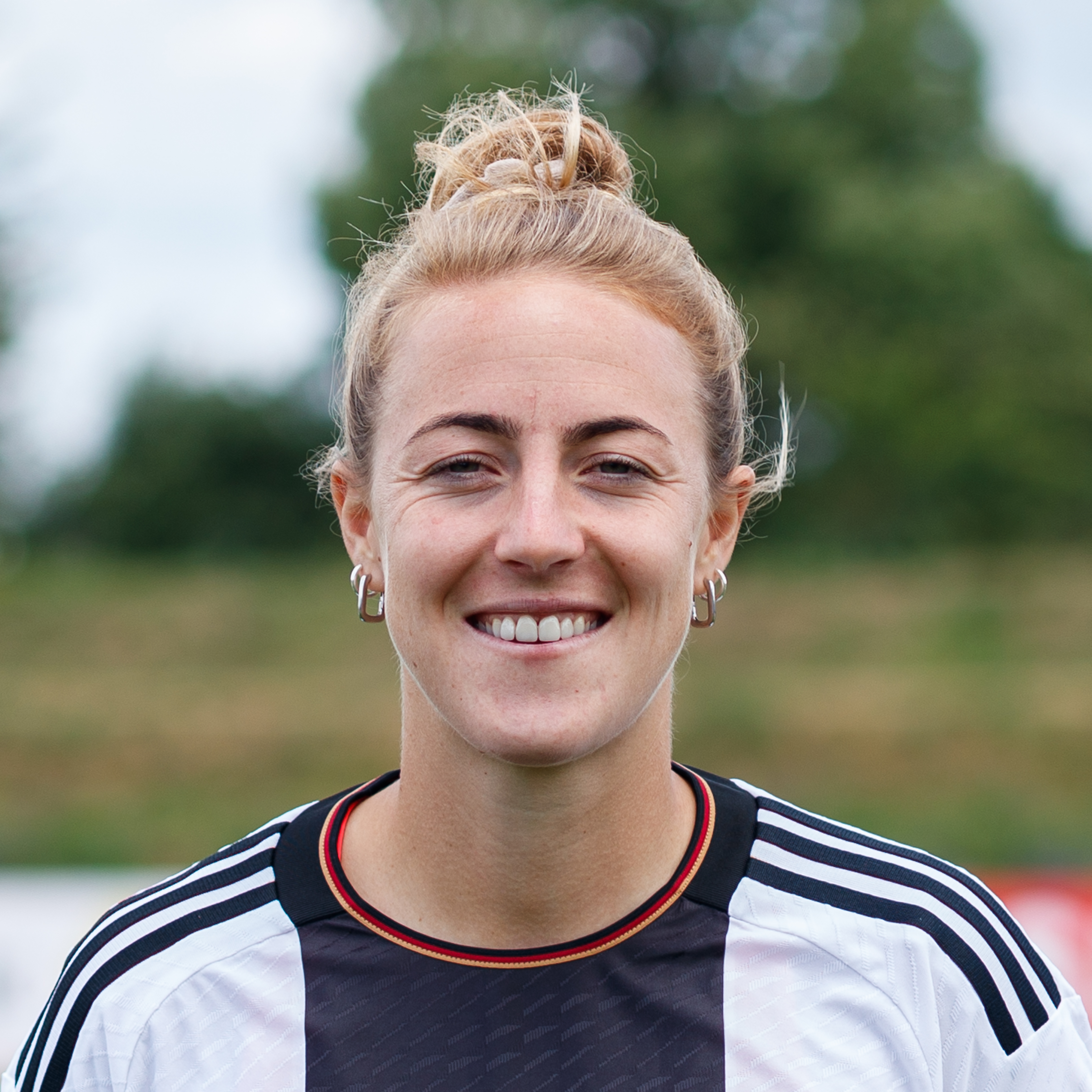
- Simon with Germany in 2023

Personal information
- Full name: Carolin Simon
- Date of birth: 24 November 1992 (age 33)
- Place of birth: Kassel, Germany
- Height: 1.65 m (5 ft 5 in)
- Position: Defender

Team information
- Current team: Bayer 04 Leverkusen
- Number: 30

Youth career
- –2008: GSV Eintracht Baunatal

Senior career*
Years	Team	Apps	(Gls)
2008–2009	TSV Jahn Calden	16	(8)
2010–2012	Hamburger SV	48	(6)
2012–2013	VfL Wolfsburg	0	(0)
2012–2013	VfL Wolfsburg II	7	(3)
2013–2016	Bayer 04 Leverkusen	70	(6)
2016–2018	SC Freiburg	35	(5)
2018–2019	Lyon	13	(0)
2019–2026	Bayern Munich	110	(12)
2024	Bayern Munich II	1	(0)
2026–	Bayer 04 Leverkusen	8	(0)

International career
2007	Germany U15	5	(0)
2007–2008	Germany U16	5	(0)
2008–2009	Germany U17	24	(2)
2009–2011	Germany U19	19	(5)
2011–2012	Germany U20	8	(2)
2016–2023	Germany	22	(3)
- * Club domestic league appearances and goals as of 20 November 2026

Carolin Simon (born 24 November 1992) is a German professional footballer who plays as a defender for Bayer 04 Leverkusen.

== Club career ==
Carolin Simon began her career with the GSV Eintracht Baunatal and moved in the summer of 2008 to third division TSV Jahn Calden. On 1 January 2010, she joined the Bundesliga team Hamburger SV for which she made 48 top-flight appearances and scored six goals over the span of two and a half years. After HSV was relegated to the Regionalliga in the summer of 2012, Simon signed with VfL Wolfsburg. However, In Wolfsburg, she appeared in only two DFB Pokal matches, as well as for the second team. In January 2013, the club announced the cancellation of the contract by mutual consent. Shortly thereafter, Simon signed with Bayer 04 Leverkusen until 30 June 2016. In Leverkusen, she was regularly in the starting line-up in the following three and a half years, and in 2015 won the last DFB-Hallenpokal with the team. After expiry of her contract in mid-2016, Simon joined SC Freiburg.

On July 2, 2018, Champions League winners Olympique Lyonnais announced the signing of Simon.

She moved to Bayern Munich for the 2019/20 season.After seven years, Simon left FC Bayern, where he played 170 competitive matches, scored 19 goals, and won five league titles and two cups.

In the summer of 2026, Carolin Simon returned to Bayer 04 Leverkusen, a club she had previously played for from 2013 to 2016. She signed a contract there running until 2028.

== International career ==
Simon played for the German national teams since 2007, in the age groups U-15 to U-20. With latter, she participated in the 2012 FIFA U-20 Women's World Cup, where the team conceded only one goal; in a 0–1 lost final against the United States. Previously, Simon won the 2008 and 2009 the UEFA Women's Under-17 Championship. She also won the 2011 UEFA Women's Under-19 Championship.

== Career statistics ==
=== International ===
Appearances and goals by national team and year
National team	Year	Apps	Goals
Germany
Germany	2016	1	0
Germany	2017	7	0
Germany	2018	6	2
Germany	2019	6	1
Germany	2022	1	0
Germany	2023	1	0
Total		22	3

Scores and results list Germany's goal tally first, score column indicates score after each Simon goal.

List of international goals scored by Carolin Simon
No.	Date	Venue	Opponent	Score	Result	Competition
1	4 September 2018	Tórshavn, Faroe Islands	Faroe Islands	4–0	8–0	2019 FIFA Women's World Cup qualification
2	4 September 2018	Tórshavn, Faroe Islands	Faroe Islands	7–0	8–0	2019 FIFA Women's World Cup qualification
3	30 May 2019	Regensburg, Germany	Chile	2–0	2–0	Friendly

== Honours ==
Bayer 04 Leverkusen

- DFB-Hallenpokal: 2015

Olympique Lyon

- Division 1 Féminine: 2018–19
- Coupe de France Féminine: 2018–19
- UEFA Women's Champions League: 2018–19

Bayern Munich

- Frauen-Bundesliga: 2020–21, 2022–23, 2023–24, 2024–25, 2025–26
- DFB-Pokal: 2024–25, 2025–26
- DFB-Supercup: 2024, 2025

Germany U17

- UEFA Women's Under-17 Championship: 2008, 2009
- FIFA U-17 Women's World Cup third place: 2008

Germany U19

- UEFA Women's Under-19 Championship: 2011

Germany U20

- FIFA U-20 Women's World Cup runner-up: 2012
