= Magou Doucouré =

French footballer (born 2000)

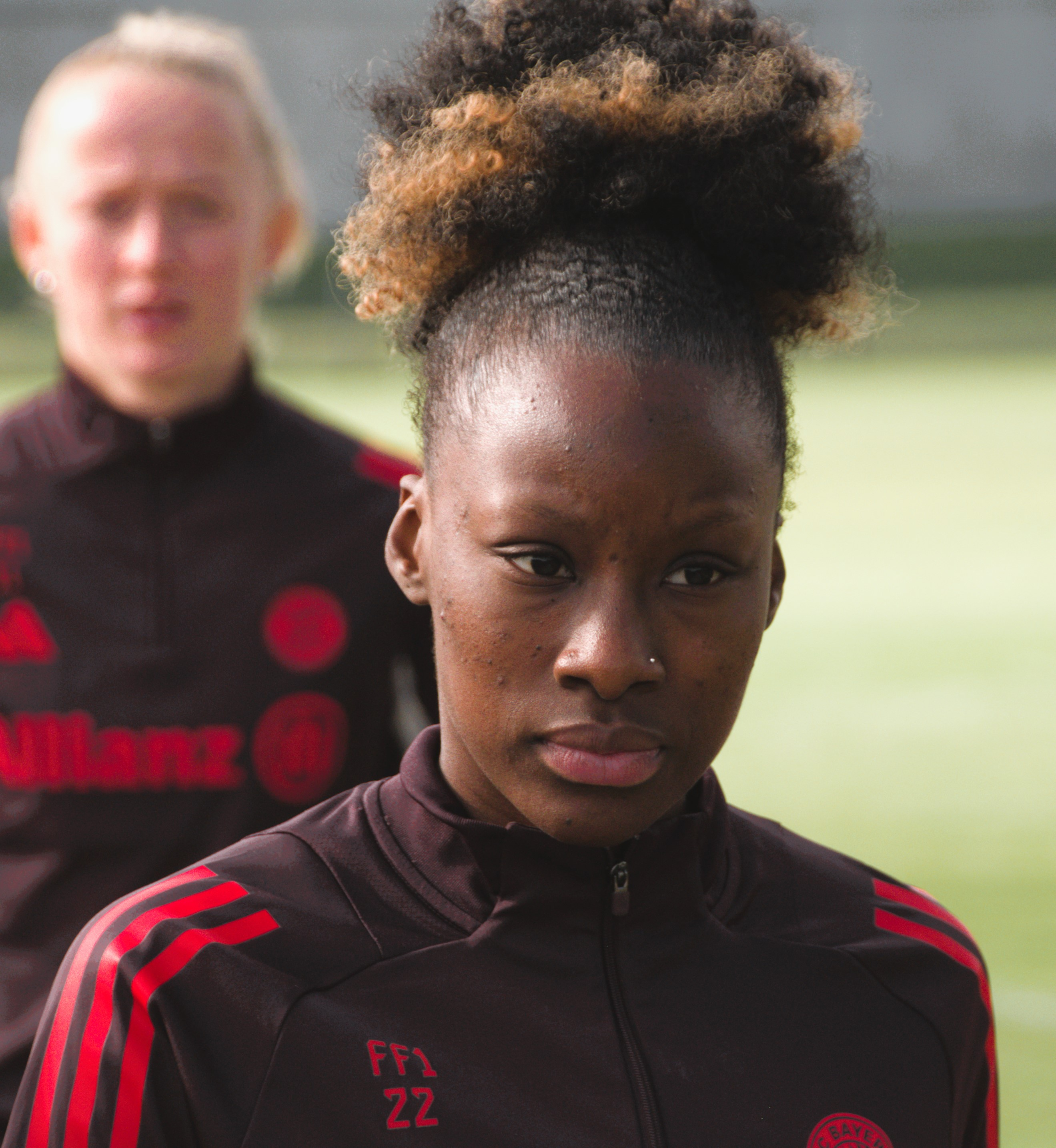
- Doucouré with Bayern Munich in 2024

Personal information
- Full name: Magou Bangou Doucouré
- Date of birth: 21 October 2000 (age 26)
- Place of birth: Paris, France
- Position: Defender

Team information
- Current team: Hamburger SV
- Number: 2

Youth career
- 2011–2014: RFC Argenteuil
- 2014–2015: Paris Saint-Germain
- 2015–2017: Paris FC

Senior career*
Years	Team	Apps	(Gls)
2017–2023	Reims	106	(1)
2023–2024	Lille	11	(0)
2024	Bayern Munich II	4	(0)
2024–2025	Bayern Munich	0	(0)
2025–2026	Napoli	4	(0)
2026–	Hamburger SV	22	(1)

International career
2018–2019	France U19	5	(0)
2020	France U20	1	(0)
2021–2022	France U23	7	(0)
- * Club domestic league appearances and goals as of 21 November 2026

Magou Bangou Doucouré (born 21 October 2000) is a French professional footballer who plays as a defender for Frauen-Bundesliga club Hamburger SV. She has previously played for Reims, Lille, Bayern Munich and Napoli.

== Club career ==
Doucouré has played for French clubs Reims and Lille in Première Ligue from 2019 to 2024. Previously, she played two seasons for Reims in the 2nd division.

On 12 September 2024, Doucouré signed a one-year contract with Frauen-Bundesliga club Bayern Munich. She made her debut for the first team on 12 November 2024 as a substitute in a UEFA Women's Champions League group match against Vålerenga.

On July 12, 2025, her signing with the Italian first division club Napoli was announced.

In January 2026, Doucouré joined Frauen-Bundesliga club Hamburger SV.
