= Lou-Ann Joly =

French footballer (born 2002)

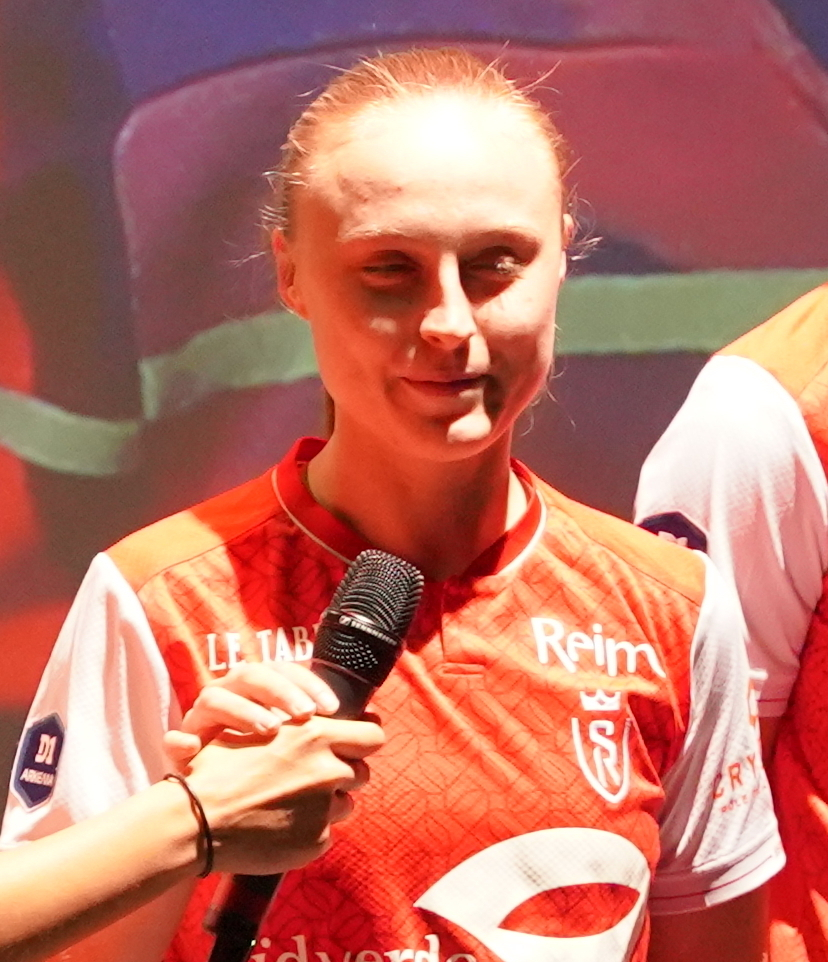
- Joly in 2024

Personal information
- Date of birth: 14 April 2002 (age 24)
- Place of birth: Bétheny, France
- Height: 1.60 m (5 ft 3 in)
- Position: Midfielder

Team information
- Current team: RB Leipzig
- Number: 6

Youth career
- 2009–2011: Bétheny FC
- 2011–2020: Reims

Senior career*
Years	Team	Apps	(Gls)
2018–2024	Reims	93	(1)
2024–	RB Leipzig	42	(0)

International career
2018	France U16	2	(0)
2018–2019	France U17	7	(2)
2021	France U20	2	(0)
2023–2026	France U23	15	(0)
- * Club domestic league appearances and goals as of 22:15, 8 October 2026 (UTC)

Lou-Ann Joly (born 14 April 2002) is a French professional footballer who plays as a midfielder for Frauen-Bundesliga club RB Leipzig. She has previously played for Reims.

== International career ==
Joly has represented France at youth level.
