= Larissa Mühlhaus =

German association football player

- Mühlhaus with Germany in 2026

Personal information
- Full name: Larissa Michelle Mühlhaus
- Date of birth: 13 January 2003 (age 23)
- Place of birth: Hamburg, Germany
- Height: 1.79 m (5 ft 10 in)
- Position: Forward

Team information
- Current team: Eintracht Frankfurt
- Number: 47

Youth career
- –2017: FC St. Pauli
- 2017–2020: Hamburger SV

Senior career*
Years	Team	Apps	(Gls)
2020–2024	Hamburger SV	70	(54)
2024–2026	Werder Bremen	47	(26)
2026–	Eintracht Frankfurt	8	(1)

International career^{‡}
2022	Germany U19	4	(0)
2024–2025	Germany U-23	10	(4)
2026–	Germany	4	(1)
- * Club domestic league appearances and goals as of 21 November 2026 ‡ National team caps and goals as of 19:45, 9 June 2026 (UTC)

Larissa Michelle Mühlhaus (born 13 January 2003) is a German footballer who plays as a forward for Frauen-Bundesliga club Eintracht Frankfurt and the Germany national team.

== Club career ==
Mühlhaus had previously played for Hamburg. In 2023, Mühlhaus was the top goal scorer in the 2. Frauen-Bundesliga.

In 2024, Mühlhaus joined SV Werder Bremen. In the 2025/26 season, she won the Bundesliga top scorer award with 17 goals.

On 24 April 2026, Mühlhaus was announced to be moving to Eintracht Frankfurt at the end of the season on a free transfer; she signed a three-year deal with her new club.

== International career ==
Mühlhaus played for Germany's under-19 and under-23 teams until 2025. Having initially been nominated for the under-23 squad in February 2026, Mühlhaus instead replaced the injured Selina Cerci for the senior team's 2027 FIFA World Cup qualifiers on short notice. She made her debut by being substituted on at half-time against Slovenia, before scoring Germany's fourth goal in a 5–0 home win.

== Career statistics ==
As of 9 June 2026

Appearances and goals by national team and year
National team	Year	Apps	Goals
Germany	2026	4	1
Total		4	1

Scores and results list Germany's goal tally first, score column indicates score after each Mühlhaus goal.

List of international goals scored by Larissa Mühlhaus
No.	Date	Venue	Opponent	Score	Result	Competition
1	3 March 2026	Rudolf-Harbig-Stadion, Dresden, Germany	Slovenia	4–0	5–0	2027 FIFA World Cup qualification
