= 2024 DFB-Supercup Frauen =

DFB-Supercup Frauen
German Women's Supercup
- Event: DFB-Supercup Frauen
| Bayern Munich | VfL Wolfsburg |
| 1 | 0 |
- Date: 25 August 2024
- Venue: Rudolf-Harbig-Stadion, Dresden
- Referee: Fabienne Michel
- Attendance: 16,690

The 2024 DFB-supercup, known as Google Pixel Supercup der Frauen for sponsorship reasons, was the seventh iteration and first after restart, of German women's super cup, contested by the winners of the previous season's top league and national cup competition.

In 2024, the contestants were Bayern Munich, as the champions of the 2023–24 Bundesliga, and VfL Wolfsburg as the winners of the 2023–24 DFB-Pokal.

Dresden had been chosen to host the 2024 edition, with the match scheduled for 25 August 2024.

Bayern Munich won the game 1–0.

== Match ==
25 August 2024
18:15 CEST (UTC+2)

| Bayern Munich | 1–0 | VfL Wolfsburg |
|---|---|---|
| Bühl 9' | Report |

Rudolf-Harbig-Stadion, Dresden
Attendance: 16,690
Referee: Fabienne Michel

| Bayern Munich | VfL Wolfsburg |

| GK | 1 | (Germany) Maria Luisa Grohs |
| RB | 6 | (Norway) Tuva Hansen |
| CB | 4 | (Iceland) Glódís Perla Viggósdóttir (c) |
| CB | 5 | (Sweden) Magdalena Eriksson |
| LB | 7 | (Germany) Giulia Gwinn | (substituted off) 78' |
| CM | 31 | (England) Georgia Stanway |
| CM | 25 | (Austria) Sarah Zadrazil |
| RW | 10 | (Germany) Linda Dallmann | (substituted off) 71' |
| AM | 21 | (Denmark) Pernille Harder |
| LW | 17 | (Germany) Klara Bühl | (substituted off) 78' |
| CF | 9 | (Serbia) Jovana Damnjanović | (substituted off) 64' |
Substitutes:
| GK | 41 | (Germany) Anna Wellmann |
| DF | 2 | (Sweden) Linda Sembrant |
| DF | 30 | (Germany) Carolin Simon | (substituted on) 78' |
| MF | 12 | (Germany) Sydney Lohmann | (substituted on) 71' |
| MF | 16 | (Sweden) Julia Zigiotti Olme |
| MF | 26 | (Scotland) Sam Kerr |
| FW | 11 | (Germany) Lea Schüller | (substituted on) 64' |
| FW | 20 | (Germany) Franziska Kett | (substituted on) 78' |
| FW | 24 | (Poland) Weronika Zawistowska |
Manager:
(Germany) Alexander Straus

| GK | 1 | (Germany) Merle Frohms |
| RB | 2 | (Netherlands) Lynn Wilms |
| CB | 4 | (Germany) Kathrin Hendrich | (substituted off) 75' |
| CB | 31 | (Germany) Marina Hegering |
| LB | 14 | (Spain) Nuria Rábano | (substituted off) 62' |
| DM | 6 | (Germany) Janina Minge | (substituted off) 85' |
| CM | 10 | (Germany) Svenja Huth (c) |
| CM | 8 | (Germany) Lena Lattwein |
| RF | 23 | (Iceland) Sveindís Jane Jónsdóttir |
| CF | 9 | (Netherlands) Lineth Beerensteyn | (substituted off) 62' |
| LF | 29 | (Germany) Jule Brand | (substituted off) 75' |
Substitutes:
| GK | 22 | (Germany) Lisa Schmitz |
| DF | 24 | (Germany) Joelle Wedemeyer | (substituted on) 75' |
| DF | 39 | (Germany) Sarai Linder | (substituted on) 62' |
| MF | 7 | (Germany) Chantal Hagel | (substituted on) 85' |
| MF | 13 | (Hungary) Luca Papp |
| MF | 18 | (Norway) Justine Kielland |
| FW | 11 | (Germany) Alexandra Popp | (substituted on) 62' |
| FW | 20 | (Spain) Ariana Arias |
| FW | 25 | (Germany) Vivien Endemann | (substituted on) 75' |
Manager:
(Germany) Tommy Stroot

Assistant referees:
Daniela Göttlinger
Annette Hanf
Fourth official:
Karoline Wacker
Video assistant referee:
Riem Hussein
Assistant video assistant referee:
Franziska Wildfeuer

Match rules

- 90 minutes
- Penalty shoot-out if scores level
- Maximum of nine named substitutes
- Maximum of five substitutions
- Maximum of three substitution opportunities
