= 2024–25 Frauen-Bundesliga =

Frauen-Bundesliga
- Season: 2024–25
- Dates: 30 August 2024 – 11 May 2025
- Champions: Bayern Munich
- Relegated: Turbine Potsdam
- Champions League: Bayern Munich; VfL Wolfsburg; Eintracht Frankfurt
- Matches: 132
- Goals: 411 (3.11 per match)
- Top goalscorer: Lineth Beerensteyn; Selina Cerci (16 goals)
- Biggest home win: Frankfurt 9–0 Potsdam
- Biggest away win: Potsdam 0–7 Hoffenheim
- Highest scoring: Frankfurt 9–0 Potsdam
- Longest winning run: 13 matches Munich
- Longest unbeaten run: 16 matches Munich
- Longest winless run: 22 matches Potsdam
- Longest losing run: 14 matches Potsdam
- Attendance: 355,407 (2,692 per match)

The 2024–25 season of the Frauen-Bundesliga was the 35th season of Germany's premier women's football league. It ran from 30 August 2024 to 11 May 2025.

Bayern Munich won their third consecutive Frauen-Bundesliga title after a 3–1 win over SC Freiburg at home on 27 April 2025.

In June 2024, the DFB announced that the 2025–26 season would be played with 14 teams, so in this season only one team got relegated.

The fixtures were announced on 15 July 2024.

== Teams ==
Locations of teams in the 2024–25 Frauen-Bundesliga

=== Team changes ===
Promoted from 2023–24 2. Bundesliga	Relegated from 2023–24 Bundesliga
Turbine Potsdam; Carl Zeiss Jena	1. FC Nürnberg; MSV Duisburg

=== Stadiums ===
Team	Home city	Home ground	Capacity
Werder Bremen	Bremen	Weserstadion Platz 11	5,500
SGS Essen	Essen	Stadion Essen	20,650
Eintracht Frankfurt	Frankfurt	Stadion am Brentanobad	5,650
SC Freiburg	Freiburg	Dreisamstadion	24,000
TSG Hoffenheim	Hoffenheim	Dietmar-Hopp-Stadion	6,350
Carl Zeiss Jena	Jena	Ernst-Abbe-Sportfeld	10,445
1. FC Köln	Cologne	Franz-Kremer-Stadion	5,457
RB Leipzig	Leipzig	Sportanlage Gontardweg	1,300
Bayer Leverkusen	Leverkusen	Ulrich-Haberland-Stadion	3,200
Bayern Munich	Munich	FC Bayern Campus	2,500
Turbine Potsdam	Potsdam	Karl-Liebknecht-Stadion	10,787
VfL Wolfsburg	Wolfsburg	AOK Stadium	5,200

== League table ==
Pos	Team	Pld	W	D	L	GF	GA	GD	Pts	Qualification or relegation
1	Bayern Munich (C)	22	19	2	1	56	13	+43	59	Qualification for Champions League league stage
2	VfL Wolfsburg	22	16	3	3	57	18	+39	51	Qualification for Champions League league stage
3	Eintracht Frankfurt	22	16	2	4	68	22	+46	50	Qualification for Champions League second round
4	Bayer Leverkusen	22	13	4	5	38	21	+17	43	
5	SC Freiburg	22	11	5	6	34	31	+3	38	
6	TSG Hoffenheim	22	12	0	10	49	30	+19	36	
7	Werder Bremen	22	9	2	11	28	39	−11	29	
8	RB Leipzig	22	8	3	11	30	40	−10	27	
9	SGS Essen	22	5	5	12	21	30	−9	20	
10	1. FC Köln	22	3	5	14	18	51	−33	14	
11	Carl Zeiss Jena	22	2	4	16	7	43	−36	10	
12	Turbine Potsdam (R)	22	0	1	21	5	73	−68	1	Relegation to the 2. Frauen-Bundesliga

Source: DFB
Rules for classification: 1) Points; 2) Goal difference; 3) Goals scored; 4) Head-to-head results; 5) Head-to-head away goals scored; 6) Away goals scored; 7) Play-off.
(C) Champions; (R) Relegated

== Results ==
Home \ Away	BRE	ESS	FRA	FRE	HOF	JEN	KÖL	LEI	LEV	MUN	POT	WOL
Werder Bremen	—	1–0	1–4	0–3	1–0	3–0	1–2	1–4	1–1	0–4	2–0	1–3
SGS Essen	0–1	—	1–3	0–0	1–2	4–1	0–0	0–0	0–2	0–2	2–1	0–2
Eintracht Frankfurt	0–1	2–1	—	6–0	3–1	2–0	8–0	3–0	3–2	0–3	9–0	3–0
SC Freiburg	3–2	1–0	3–2	—	0–3	1–1	2–0	4–1	1–2 (Note: The match, originally ended in a 3–2 win for Leverkusen, was replayed due to an error by the referee.)	2–2	3–0	1–1
TSG Hoffenheim	1–0	1–0	0–1	2–3	—	4–0	5–1	5–2	1–0	1–3	6–0	0–3
Carl Zeiss Jena	0–1	0–2	0–3	0–2	0–3	—	2–2	1–1	0–2	0–1	1–0	0–1
1. FC Köln	1–4	2–2	0–4	0–2	0–3	0–1	—	1–3	1–2	0–3	4–0	0–0
RB Leipzig	2–0	0–3	0–2	1–1	3–1	2–0	2–1	—	0–1	0–1	4–1	0–2
Bayer Leverkusen	6–0	1–1	2–2	2–0	2–1	1–0	1–1	1–0	—	2–3	3–0	1–0
Bayern Munich	1–0	3–0	1–1	3–1	5–1	5–0	1–0	6–2	2–0	—	2–0	3–1
Turbine Potsdam	1–4	0–3	0–6	0–1	0–7	0–0	0–1	0–3	1–3	0–2	—	0–4
VfL Wolfsburg	3–3	5–1	6–1	3–0	2–1	3–0	5–1	5–0	3–1	2–0	3–1	—

Source: DFB
Legend: Blue = home team win; Yellow = draw; Red = away team win.

== Statistics ==
=== Top scorers ===
Rank	Player	Club	Goals
1	(Netherlands) Lineth Beerensteyn	VfL Wolfsburg	16
1	(Germany) Selina Cerci	TSG Hoffenheim	16
4	(Germany) Nicole Anyomi	Eintracht Frankfurt	14
4	(Germany) Laura Freigang	Eintracht Frankfurt	14
4	(Denmark) Pernille Harder	Bayern Munich	14
6	(Denmark) Cornelia Kramer	Bayer Leverkusen	12
7	(Germany) Giovanna Hoffmann	RB Leipzig	11
7	(Germany) Lea Schüller	Bayern Munich	11
9	(Germany) Vanessa Fudalla	RB Leipzig	10
9	(Germany) Larissa Mühlhaus	Werder Bremen	10
9	(Switzerland) Géraldine Reuteler	Eintracht Frankfurt	10

=== Hat-tricks ===
Player	Club	Against	Result	Date
(Germany) Laura Freigang	Eintracht Frankfurt	Turbine Potsdam	6–0 (A)	22 September 2024
(Denmark) Pernille Harder	Bayern Munich	TSG Hoffenheim	5–1 (H)	23 September 2024
(Japan) Remina Chiba	Eintracht Frankfurt	SC Freiburg	6–0 (H)	14 October 2024
(Germany) Laura Freigang	Eintracht Frankfurt	1. FC Köln	8–0 (H)	9 November 2024
(Germany) Larissa Mühlhaus	Werder Bremen	Turbine Potsdam	4–1 (A)	1 February 2025
(Slovenia) Lara Prašnikar	Eintracht Frankfurt	Turbine Potsdam	9–0 (H)	9 February 2025
(Belgium) Féli Delacauw	TSG Hoffenheim	Turbine Potsdam	7–0 (A)	29 March 2025
(Netherlands) Lineth Beerensteyn^{4}	VfL Wolfsburg	SGS Essen	5–1 (H)	30 March 2025
(Germany) Selina Cerci	TSG Hoffenheim	Carl Zeiss Jena	4–0 (H)	11 May 2025

(H) – Home; (A) – Away
^{4} – Player scored four goals.

=== Clean sheets ===
Rank	Player	Club	Clean sheets
1	(Germany) Stina Johannes	Eintracht Frankfurt	11
2	(Germany) Friederike Repohl	Bayer Leverkusen	9
3	(Germany) Laura Dick	TSG Hoffenheim	8
3	(Germany) Ena Mahmutovic	Bayern Munich	8
5	(Germany) Rafaela Borggräfe	SC Freiburg	7
6	(Germany) Merle Frohms	VfL Wolfsburg	6
6	(Switzerland) Livia Peng	Werder Bremen	6
8	(Germany) Maria Luisa Grohs	Bayern Munich	5
9	(Germany) Anneke Borbe	VfL Wolfsburg	4
9	(Switzerland) Elvira Herzog	RB Leipzig	4
9	(Germany) Sophia Winkler	SGS Essen	4

== See also ==
- 2024 DFB-Supercup Frauen
- 2024–25 DFB-Pokal Frauen
