= FC Bayern Campus =

Sports complex in Munich, Germany

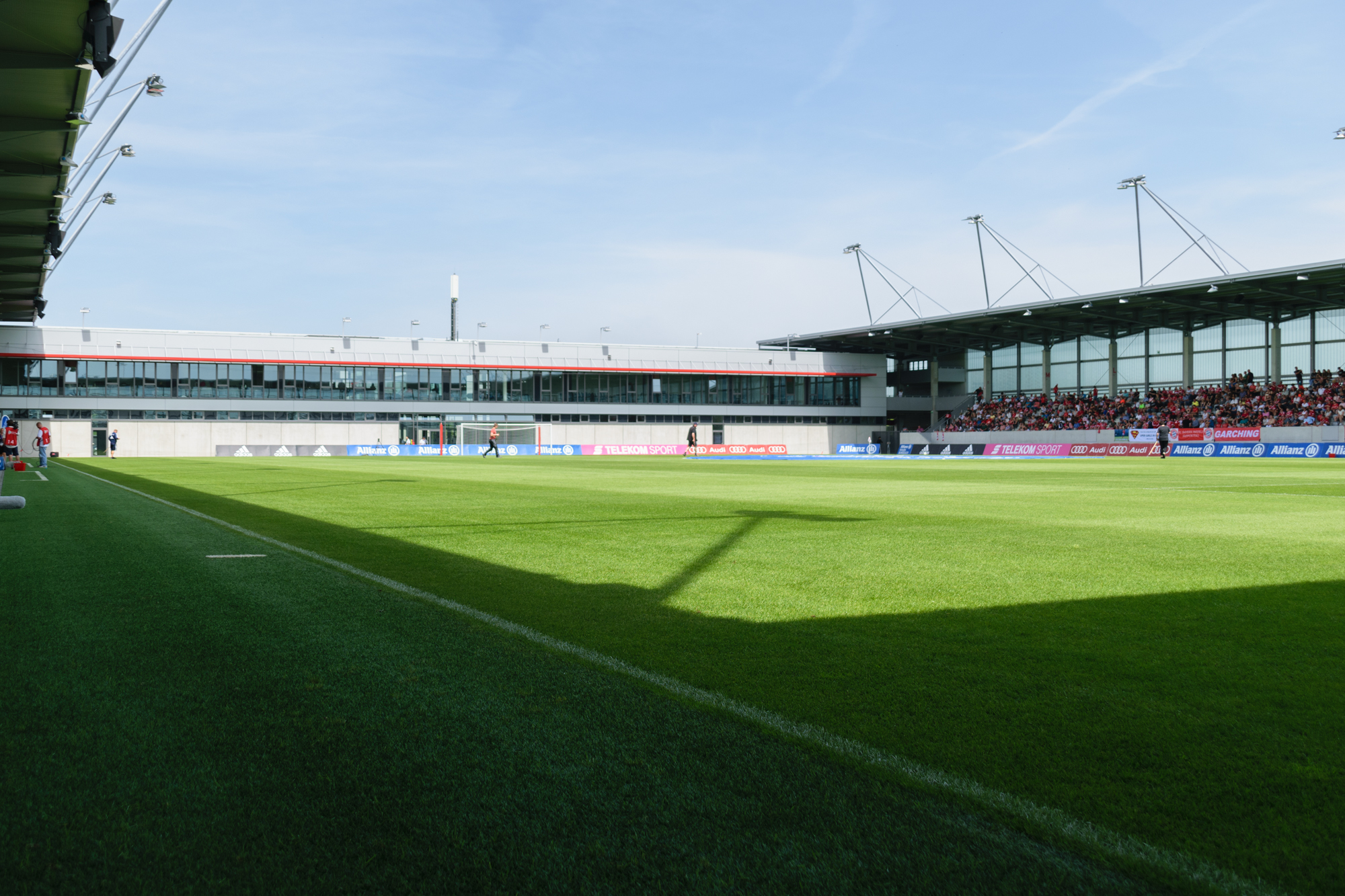
- Interactive map of FC Bayern Campus
- Address: Ingolstädter Straße 272; 80939 Munich
- Location: Munich, Germany
- Coordinates: 48°12′45″N 11°35′27″E
- Owner: Bayern Munich
- Operator: Bayern Munich
- Capacity: 2,500
- Type: Stadium
- Surface: Grass
- Scoreboard: Yes
- Record attendance: 4,347

Construction
- Groundbreaking: 2015
- Built: 2015–2017
- Opened: 21 August 2017
- Cost: €70,000,000

Tenants
- Bayern Munich Junior Team (2017–present); Bayern Munich (women) (2017–present)

Website
- The Campus - fcbayern.com

The FC Bayern Campus is a sports complex located in the north of Munich. It was built between 2015 and 2017 on the northern part of the Fürst-Wrede-Kaserne by football club Bayern Munich to create a central location for the clubs' youth teams. The construction costs amounted to €70 million. The campus has facilities for football, basketball, handball and table tennis, spread over an area of 30 hectares. The campus has 8 football pitches for youth teams from the U-9s to the U-19s and the women's and girls' teams. The Allianz FC Bayern Akademie is located on the campus site and the academy has 35 apartments for young talents who don't live in the Greater Munich area. The academy building also has offices for youth coaches and staff. It includes a stadium with a capacity of 2,500 for matches in Under 17 Bundesliga, Under 19 Bundesliga, DFB Youth Cup and the UEFA Youth League. Jochen Sauer is the director of the academy and Hermann Gerland is the athletic director.

The first sold-out match took place on 17 June 2018 in the final of the Under 17 Bundesliga between the Under-17 teams of Bayern Munich and Borussia Dortmund. On 5 November 2023, a test match against Wolfsburg with increased capacity was run successfully.
