= 2022–23 Frauen-Bundesliga =

Frauen-Bundesliga
- Season: 2022–23
- Dates: 16 September 2022 – 29 May 2023
- Champions: Bayern Munich
- Relegated: SV Meppen; Turbine Potsdam
- Champions League: Bayern Munich; VfL Wolfsburg; Eintracht Frankfurt
- Matches: 132
- Goals: 427 (3.23 per match)
- Top goalscorer: Alexandra Popp (16 goals)
- Biggest home win: Munich 11–1 Potsdam
- Biggest away win: Duisburg 0–6 Essen
- Highest scoring: Munich 11–1 Potsdam
- Longest winning run: 15 games Munich
- Longest unbeaten run: 17 games Munich
- Longest winless run: 15 games Potsdam
- Longest losing run: 13 games Potsdam
- Attendance: 359,428 (2,723 per match)

The 2022–23 season of the Frauen-Bundesliga was the 33rd season of Germany's premier women's football league. It ran from 16 September 2022 to 28 May 2023.

The fixtures were announced on 5 July 2022.

Bayern Munich won their fourth title, while SV Meppen and Turbine Potsdam were relegated to the 2. Frauen-Bundesliga.

== Teams ==
Locations of teams in the 2022–23 Frauen-Bundesliga

=== Team changes ===
Promoted from 2021–22 2. Bundesliga	Relegated from 2021–22 Bundesliga
SV Meppen; MSV Duisburg	SC Sand; Carl Zeiss Jena

=== Stadiums ===
Team	Home city	Home ground	Capacity
Werder Bremen	Bremen	Weserstadion Platz 11	5,500
MSV Duisburg	Duisburg	PCC-Stadion	3,000
SGS Essen	Essen	Stadion Essen	20,650
Eintracht Frankfurt	Frankfurt	Stadion am Brentanobad	5,650
SC Freiburg	Freiburg	Dreisamstadion	24,000
1899 Hoffenheim	Hoffenheim	Dietmar-Hopp-Stadion	6,350
1. FC Köln	Cologne	Franz-Kremer-Stadion	5,457
Bayer Leverkusen	Leverkusen	Ulrich-Haberland-Stadion	3,200
SV Meppen	Meppen	Hänsch-Arena	16,500
Bayern Munich	Munich	FC Bayern Campus	2,500
Turbine Potsdam	Potsdam	Karl-Liebknecht-Stadion	10,787
VfL Wolfsburg	Wolfsburg	AOK Stadium	5,200

== League table ==
Pos	Team	Pld	W	D	L	GF	GA	GD	Pts	Qualification or relegation
1	Bayern Munich (C)	22	19	2	1	67	8	+59	59	Qualification for Champions League group stage
2	VfL Wolfsburg	22	19	0	3	75	17	+58	57	Qualification for Champions League second round
3	Eintracht Frankfurt	22	17	3	2	57	22	+35	54	Qualification for Champions League first round
4	1899 Hoffenheim	22	15	3	4	55	25	+30	48	
5	Bayer Leverkusen	22	9	3	10	31	28	+3	30	
6	SC Freiburg	22	7	3	12	36	47	−11	24	
7	SGS Essen	22	6	5	11	26	42	−16	23	
8	Werder Bremen	22	5	6	11	16	39	−23	21	
9	1. FC Köln	22	5	4	13	20	44	−24	19	
10	MSV Duisburg	22	5	3	14	15	47	−32	18	
11	SV Meppen (R)	22	5	2	15	16	40	−24	17	Relegation to 2. Bundesliga
12	Turbine Potsdam (R)	22	2	2	18	13	68	−55	8	Relegation to 2. Bundesliga

Source: DFB
Rules for classification: 1) Points; 2) Goal difference; 3) Goals scored; 4) Head-to-head points; 5) Head-to-head goal difference; 6) Head-to-head goals scored; 7) Head-to-head away goals scored; 8) Away goals scored; 9) Play-off.
(C) Champions; (R) Relegated

== Results ==
Home \ Away	BRE	DUI	ESS	FRA	FRE	HOF	KÖL	LEV	MEP	MUN	POT	WOL
Werder Bremen	—	0–0	3–2	0–2	1–2	1–1	1–0	0–2	0–0	0–2	1–1	2–3
MSV Duisburg	0–1	—	0–6	0–1	1–1	0–1	2–1	0–1	1–0	0–4	3–0	0–3
SGS Essen	0–0	0–0	—	0–4	2–1	2–3	4–0	0–0	1–0	1–2	2–1	0–3
Eintracht Frankfurt	3–1	3–2	4–1	—	4–1	3–3	2–0	1–0	6–0	0–0	3–0	4–0
SC Freiburg	1–1	4–1	5–2	2–4	—	0–1	1–3	3–2	3–1	0–3	0–1	0–4
1899 Hoffenheim	4–0	7–0	2–0	3–3	3–2	—	4–0	3–1	4–0	0–4	6–1	1–2
1. FC Köln	2–0	4–0	1–1	0–2	0–0	3–1	—	0–0	1–2	0–5	4–2	0–4
Bayer Leverkusen	0–2	2–0	6–0	2–3	2–0	0–1	1–0	—	0–1	0–0	3–0	1–4
SV Meppen	2–0	0–2	1–1	0–1	1–2	0–2	1–0	1–2	—	0–2	2–0	2–3
Bayern Munich	3–0	4–0	2–0	2–1	8–2	1–0	4–0	2–0	3–1	—	11–1	1–0
Turbine Potsdam	1–2	0–3	0–1	0–3	0–5	1–3	0–0	1–5	3–1	0–3	—	0–2
VfL Wolfsburg	8–0	4–0	4–0	5–0	2–1	1–2	7–1	6–1	3–0	2–1	5–0	—

Source: DFB
Legend: Blue = home team win; Yellow = draw; Red = away team win.

== Top scorers ==
Rank	Player	Club	Goals
1	(Germany) Alexandra Popp	VfL Wolfsburg	16
2	(Slovenia) Lara Prašnikar	Eintracht Frankfurt	14
2	(Germany) Lea Schüller	Bayern Munich	14
4	(Poland) Ewa Pajor	VfL Wolfsburg	12
5	(Germany) Laura Freigang	Eintracht Frankfurt	10
6	(Germany) Melissa Kössler	1899 Hoffenheim	9
6	(Germany) Janina Minge	SC Freiburg	9
8	(Germany) Nicole Anyomi	Eintracht Frankfurt	8
8	(Germany) Mandy Islacker	1. FC Köln	8
8	(Germany) Lina Magull	Bayern Munich	8
8	(Germany) Ramona Maier	SGS Essen	8
8	(Kosovo) Erëleta Memeti	1899 Hoffenheim	8

== See also ==
- 2022–23 DFB-Pokal Frauen
