= 2026–27 Copa de la Reina de Fútbol =

2026–2027 Copa de la Reina de Fútbol
Campeonato de España Copa de Su Majestad la Reina

Tournament details
- Country: Spain
- Teams: 48

Tournament statistics
- Matches played: 24
- Goals scored: 75 (3.13 per match)
- All statistics correct as of 30 September 2026.

The 2026–27 Copa de la Reina de Fútbol is the 45th edition of the Spanish women's association football national cup organized by the Royal Spanish Football Federation (RFEF).

Barcelona are the defending champions.

== Schedule and format ==
All ties are played in a single-match decider at the home ground of the lower division opponent. All matches ending in a tie will be decided by a penalty shootout if there's still a tie. Additionally, the two finalists will be selected for the Supercopa de España Femenina taking place in January 2028.

Round	Draw date	Match date	Fixtures	Clubs	Format details
First round	19 August 2026	8–9 September 2026	16	32 → 16	Knock-out tournament type: Single match.
Second round	11 September 2026	29–30 September 2026	8	16 → 8	Knock-out tournament type: Single match.
Third round	5 October 2026	12–25 November 2026	8	16 → 8	Knock-out tournament type: Single match.
Round of 16			8	16 → 8	Knock-out tournament type: Single match.
Quarter-finals			4	8 → 4	Knock-out tournament type: Single match.
Semi-finals			2	4 → 2	Knock-out tournament type: Single match.
Final			1	2 → 1	Single match.

== First round ==
=== Draw ===
The draw was completed by the RFEF on 19 August 2026, at the Ciudad del Fútbol de Las Rozas in Madrid. The games were played on the 8th and 9th of September 2026.

=== Teams ===
The teams participating in the First round are:

2 teams relegated from 2025-26 Liga F	6 teams from 2026-2027 Primera Federación	24 teams from 2026-27 Segunda Federación	
Alhama CF; Levante	Albacete; Cacereño; Osasuna; RU Tenerife; Sport Extremadura; Villarreal	AEM; CD Argual; Balears; Bizkerre Club; Burgos CF; Celta Vigo; Córdoba CF; Elche; Europa; CD Femarguín Gran Canaria; Getafe; Guiniguada Apolinario; SD Huesca; Málaga	Olympia Las Rozas; Pozuelo de Alarcón; Racing Club; Real Avilés; Real Betis; Real Oviedo; CD Samper; Sporting Club; Sporting de Gijón; Zaragoza CFF

=== Matches ===
8 September 2026	Racing Club	2–4	Osasuna	El Astillero
18:00 CEST (UTC+2)	García 61'; Gutiérrez 90+2' (pen.)	Report	Sarriegi 17'; López 48', 85'; Igoa 55'	Stadium: Campos de Sport de La Planchada; Referee: Lucía Sainz-Pardo Ruiz

8 September 2026	Huesca	2–2 (6–5 p)	Zaragoza CFF	Huesca
19:00 CEST (UTC+2)	Hernández 11', 35' (pen.)	Report	Ondiviela 21'; Valej 68'	Stadium: Base Aragonesa de Fútbol; Referee: José Antonio Gimeno Otal
	Penalties
	Sancho (penalty scored); Palomino (penalty scored); Cameron (penalty scored); Díaz Crespo (penalty scored); Arnas (penalty scored); Dopico (penalty scored)		Cardona (penalty scored); Ramos (penalty scored); Reina (penalty scored); Mitkovska (penalty scored); Cañada (penalty scored); Ondiviela (penalty missed)

8 September 2026	AEM	1–1 (2–4 p)	Europa	Lleida
19:00 CEST (UTC+2)	Bareiro 33'	Report	Santana 59'	Stadium: Camp de Futbol Municipal de Recasens; Referee: Alba Arija Asín
	Penalties
	Molina (penalty scored); Farreras (penalty scored); Mocholi (penalty missed); Sánchez (penalty missed)		Márquez (penalty scored); Fernández (penalty scored); Lobo (penalty missed); Andrino (penalty scored); Díaz (penalty scored)

8 September 2026	Alhama CF	1–0	Albacete	Alhama de Murcia
19:30 CEST (UTC+2)	Altuve 73'	Report		Stadium: Campo Municipal de Fútbol Jose Kubala; Referee: Cristina Yolanda Aguilera Manzano

9 September 2026	CD Argual	4–2	RU Tenerife	Santa Cruz de Tenerife
16:30 CEST (UTC+2)	Zárate 23'; Arguelles 63'; Capdevila 67'; Plaza 77'	Report	González 55'; López 84'	Stadium: Estadio Municipal Aceró; Referee: Diana Carolina Luna González

9 September 2026	Getafe	1–0	Pozuelo de Alarcón	Getafe
17:00 CEST (UTC+2)	Bodolo 11'	Report		Stadium: Complejo Deportivo Municipal Alhóndiga; Referee: Paula Porcuna Sánchez

9 September 2026	Real Oviedo	3–0	Sporting de Gijón	Oviedo
17:30 CEST (UTC+2)	Garrido 43'; Muñoz 45+2'; Sordo 47'	Report		Stadium: El Requexón; Referee: Sara Diaz Alvarez

9 September 2026	Elche	1–6	Levante	Elche
18:00 CEST (UTC+2)	Barcia 53'	Report	Escoms 8'; Sanadri 13', 71'; Arias 33'; Marín 41'; Silva 87'	Stadium: Poliesportiu Municipal d'Altabix; Referee: Naira Martinez

9 September 2026	Córdoba	2–1	Real Betis	Córdoba
18:15 CEST (UTC+2)	Muñoz 1' (pen.), 63'	Report	Riumalló 69'	Stadium: Ciudad Deportiva Córdoba CF; Referee: Maria Del Carmen Palma Navarro

9 September 2026	Sporting Club	1–0	Málaga	Huelva
18:30 CEST (UTC+2)	Gasienica 80' (pen.)	Report		Stadium: Ciudad Deportiva Decano; Referee: Paula Sánchez Rodríguez

9 September 2026	Balears	0–1	Villarreal	Palma de Mallorca
18:30 CEST (UTC+2)		Report	González 43'	Stadium: Campo de Son Malferit; Referee: Sonia Valenzuela Chaouqi

9 September 2026	Celta Vigo	0–0 (4–2 p)	Real Avilés	Vigo
19:00 CEST (UTC+2)		Report		Stadium: A Madroa Facilities; Referee: Uxia Boimorto Blanco
	Penalties
	Couso (penalty scored); Toubes (penalty scored); Fernández (penalty missed); Albiol (penalty scored); Debén (penalty scored)		Oliveira (penalty scored); Douglas (penalty missed); Moreno (penalty missed); Rodriguez (penalty scored)

9 September 2026	Burgos	2–1	Bizkerre Club	Burgos
19:00 CEST (UTC+2)	Tores 9'; Mata 19'	Report	Zeberio 11'	Stadium: Ciudad Deportiva de Castañares; Referee: Leyre Antolin Miguel

9 September 2026	Guiniguada Apolinario	1–0	Femarguín Gran Canaria	Las Palmas
19:30 CEST (UTC+2)	Parralejo 66' (o.g.)	Report		Stadium: Campo de Fútbol Parque Atlántico; Referee: Michelle Santana Corchado

9 September 2026	Sport Extremadura	3–3 (3–4 p)	Cacereño	Badajoz
20:30 CEST (UTC+2)	Martínez 22', 86'; Chaves 33'	Report	Varela 9'; Carillo 30'; Jiménez 67'	Stadium: Instalaciones Deportivas Municipales El Vivero; Referee: Raquel Suárez González
	Penalties
	Chaves (penalty missed); Lima (penalty scored); Labrador (penalty scored); Herrera (penalty scored); Montilla (penalty missed)		Carillo (penalty scored); Caparroz (penalty scored); Jiménez (penalty missed); Sánchez (penalty scored); Moran (penalty scored)

9 September 2026	CD Samper	2–0	Olympia Las Rozas	Coslada
21:00 CEST (UTC+2)	Ruiz de la Fuente 25'; Delgado 47'	Report		Stadium: El Olivo; Referee: Sandra González López Rey

== Second round ==
=== Draw ===
The draw took place by the RFEF on 11 September 2026 at 11:00 CEST (UTC+2), at the Ciudad del Fútbol de Las Rozas in Madrid. The games were played on 29 and 30 September 2026.

=== Matches ===
29 September 2026	Huesca	0–1	Osasuna	Huesca
19:00 CEST (UTC+2)		Report	Igoa 68'	Stadium: Base Aragonesa de Fútbol; Referee: Andres Nadal

30 September 2026	Burgos	0–4	Cacereño	Burgos
17:00 CEST (UTC+2)		Report	Sánchez 36', 71', 77'; Mbappé 90+2'	Stadium: Ciudad Deportiva de Castañares; Referee: Paloma Sánchez

30 September 2026	CD Argual	2–0	Guiniguada Apolinario	Santa Cruz de Tenerife
17:00 CEST (UTC+2)	González 1'; Pérez 48'	Report		Stadium: Estadio Municipal Aceró; Referee: Estilita de los Ángeles González

30 September 2026	Celta Vigo	3–1	Real Oviedo	Vigo
17:30 CEST (UTC+2)	Acevedo 45+1', 59'; Albiol 90+2'	Report	Cano 80'	Stadium: A Madroa Facilities; Referee: Daniela Romero

30 September 2026	Levante	3–1	Alhama CF	Bunyol
18:00 CEST (UTC+2)	Arias 3'; Sanadri 87'; Férez 90+1'	Report	Moreno 84'	Stadium: Ciudad Deportiva de Buñol; Referee: Amy Peñalver Pearce

30 September 2026	Sporting Club	7–1	Córdoba	Huelva
18:00 CEST (UTC+2)	Gasienica 4'; Cintado 8', 47'; Durán 50' (pen.), 90'; Mejias 58'; Quintana 61'	Report	Rodríguez (red card) 42'; Orzaez 88'	Stadium: Ciudad Deportiva Decano; Referee: Ana Perez

30 September 2026	Europa	4–0	Villarreal	Barcelona
19:30 CEST (UTC+2)	Serrat 37', 43'; Fernández 78' (pen.); Arcos 88'	Report		Stadium: Nou Sardenya; Referee: Sandra González

30 September 2026	CD Samper	1–0	Getafe	Coslada
21:00 CEST (UTC+2)	García 48'	Report		Stadium: El Olivo; Referee: Alejandra Raza

== Third round ==
=== Draw ===
The draw took place by the RFEF on 5 October 2026 at 16:30 CEST (UTC+2), at the Ciudad del Fútbol de Las Rozas in Madrid. All games originally scheduled to be played on 3–5 November 2026 were postponed by the RFEF due to the death of player Jesús de Miguel.

=== Teams ===
The teams participating in the Third round are:

Winners of Second round	Teams in position 9 to 14 from 2025-26 Liga F	Teams promoted to 2026-27 Liga F
Osasuna; Cacereño; CD Argual; Celta Vigo; Levante; Sporting Club; Europa; CD Samper	Madrid CFF; Badalona Women; Espanyol; Deportivo Abanca; Eibar; Logroño United	Alavés; Valencia

=== Matches ===
12 November 2026	Osasuna	2–3	Logroño United	Pamplona
19:00 CET (UTC+1)	Parada 2'; Churruca 90'	Report	Adamolekun 20'; Redondo 37'; Barquero 72'	Stadium: Tajonar Facilities; Referee: Beatriz Cuesta

12 November 2026	Europa	0–1	Deportivo Abanca	Barcelona
20:00 CET (UTC+1)		Report	García 90+2'	Stadium: Nou Sardenya; Referee: Lorena del Mar Trujillano

18 November 2026	Levante	0–1	Eibar	Bunyol
18:00 CET (UTC+1)		Report	Rico 65'	Stadium: Ciudad Deportiva de Buñol; Referee: Ágata López

18 November 2026	Cacereño	1–1 (2–4 p)	Alavés	Cáceres
19:00 CET (UTC+1)	Carrillo Moreno 40'	Report	Brasero-Carreira 49'	Stadium: Manuel Sánchez Delgado; Referee: Eugenia Gil Soriano
	Penalties
	Mbappé (penalty scored); López Rico (penalty scored); Lezcano (penalty missed); Cervera (penalty missed)		Altamira (penalty scored); López (penalty scored); Reyes Moreno (penalty scored); Viles (penalty missed); Brima (penalty scored)

18 November 2026	CD Samper	0–3	Valencia	Coslada
20:30 CET (UTC+1)		Report	Morató 15'; Izquierdo 15' (o.g.); Gómez 53'	Stadium: El Olivo; Referee: Zulema González González

19 November 2026	Celta Vigo	2–1	Espanyol	Vigo
19:00 CET (UTC+1)	Couso 45+3'; Fernández 74' (pen.)	Report	Torrás 31'	Stadium: A Madroa Facilities; Referee: Alicia Espinosa

19 November 2026	CD Argual	2–0	Madrid CFF	Santa Cruz de Tenerife
19:00 CET (UTC+1)	Linazasoro 83'; Carro 90+2'	Report		Stadium: Municipal Aceró; Referee: Ylenia Sánchez

25 November 2026	Sporting Club	v	Badalona Women	Huelva
19:00 CET (UTC+1)				Stadium: Ciudad Deportiva Decano; Referee: Melissa López

== Round of 16 ==
=== Teams ===
The teams involved in the Round of 16 will be:

Winners of Third round	Teams in position 1 to 8 from 2025-26 Liga F
Logroño United; Deportivo Abanca; Eibar; Alavés; Valencia; Celta Vigo; CD Argual	Barcelona; Real Madrid; Real Sociedad; Tenerife; Atlético Madrid; Granada; Athletic Club; Sevilla

== Top goalscorers ==
As of 30 September 2026

Rank	Player	Club	Goals
1	(Spain) Marina Sánchez	Cacereño	3
1	(Spain) Sanadri	Levante	3
