= Francisco Blake Mora =

Mexican politician

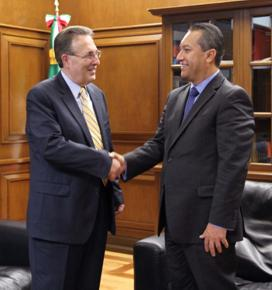
- Blake (right) meets with Earl Anthony Wayne

Secretary of the Interior of Mexico
- In office 14 July 2010 – 11 November 2011
- President: Felipe Calderón
- Preceded by: Fernando Gómez Mont
- Succeeded by: Alejandro Poiré Romero

Personal details
- Born: José Francisco Blake Mora; 22 May 1966 Tijuana, Baja California, Mexico
- Died: 11 November 2011 (aged 45) Chalco, State of Mexico, Mexico
- Party: National Action Party
- Spouse: Gloria Cossío
- Children: José Francisco Blake Cossío, Gloria Elissa Blake Cossío
- Education: Autonomous University of Baja California
- Profession: Politician, lawyer
- Cabinet: Felipe Calderón

José Francisco Blake Mora (Spanish pronunciation: [xoˈse fɾanˈsisko ˈβlejk ˈmoɾa]; 22 May 1966 – 11 November 2011) was a Mexican lawyer and politician who served as the Secretary of the Interior in the cabinet of Felipe Calderón from 2010 to 2011. He was Mexico's top cabinet secretary and key figure in the battle against the drug cartels and corruption in the country. Blake Mora was also an important official in the dialogues of Felipe Calderón's drug policy, where he constantly traveled to meet with governors and victims of the drug war.

== Early life and education ==
Blake Mora was born in a working-class family in Tijuana, Baja California. He obtained a degree in law from the Autonomous University of Baja California (UABC) and a diploma in strategic planning and public policy from the Autonomous Technological Institute of Mexico (ITAM).

== Career ==
Blake Mora was elected to the office of Alderman of the City of Tijuana from 1995 to 1998, and later served as a federal deputy for the Fifth Federal Electoral District of Baja California in the LVIII Legislature from 2000 to 2003. He then served as a member of the Congress of Baja California from 2004 to 2007. According to Fox News, Blake Mora gained popularity as a public official because he had promoted the cooperation of military forces and civil authorities to combat the drug cartels in his home state of Baja California before becoming Secretary of Interior.

On 1 November 2007, he was appointed Secretary General of the Government of Baja California by Governor José Guadalupe Osuna Millán. In 2009, he was named as a possible candidate for the office of Attorney General of the Republic. On 14 July 2010, President Felipe Calderón named him Secretary of the Interior to replace Fernando Gómez Mont.

Blake Mora promoted Felipe Calderón's strategy of eradicating the organized crime in Mexico and the notoriously corruption-plagued state and police forces. The British newspaper The Guardian described Blake Mora as Mexico's number-two official in fighting the drug cartels, after the president. In addition, Blake Mora carried out the project for new national identity card for underage people, with modern features that included digitalized fingerprints and iris images saved in government databases, which was intended to prevent criminals from using false IDs.

== Death ==
Blake Mora died in a helicopter accident along with seven other people in Chalco de Díaz Covarrubias, Estado de México, just outside Mexico City. There were no survivors as the aircraft slammed into a hill. The helicopter, an Aérospatiale Super Puma, was traveling to Cuernavaca, Morelos for a meeting of prosecutors when it went down. Marcelo Ebrard, the Head of Government of the Federal District, said in an interview through CNN México that the helicopter was "completely destroyed," since it crashed head-on against a hill. Then, the helicopter impacted several times over the terrain as the pilot tried to land the aircraft safely.

Reports state that early in the morning before Blake Mora left Mexico City, the helicopter took a few minutes to take off due to dense fog, which has made observers speculate that visibility was a major factor of the collision. After the helicopter failed to arrive at the estimated time, aircraft were sent to investigate the situation, and eventually reported the damaged helicopter at 11:12 a.m. local time. Along with Blake Mora, the following people were killed in the accident: Felipe Zamora, general of legal affairs; José Alfredo García Medina, director of social communications; Diana Hayton Sánchez, Blake Mora's secretary; René de León Zapien, lieutenant general; Felipe Cortés and Pedro Ramón Escobar, both air force lieutenants; and Jorge Luis Juárez Gómez, army sergeant.

Although not confirmed, some sources claimed that the President Felipe Calderón had plans to travel in the helicopter that Blake Mora was killed in, and was awaiting the flight until the accident occurred. President Calderón said that the helicopter was flying in foggy conditions, and that the crash "was probably an accident." Investigations regarding his death were carried out immediately after the accident. The death of Blake Mora is the second loss of an incumbent Secretary of the Interior during the Calderón presidency, the first one being Juan Camilo Mouriño, who died in a plane crash in 2008.

Blake Mora's last Twitter post before his death recalled Mouriño's death:

Today we remember Juan Camilo Mouriño three years after his passing, a human being who worked to construct a better Mexico.

=== Reactions ===
- United States – The president of the United States, Barack Obama, "called to tell President Calderón that he was shocked and saddened to learn of the tragic death of the Mexican Interior Minister Francisco Blake Mora, along with, apparently, seven of his Mexican government colleagues, in a helicopter crash earlier today. Obama said that his thoughts and prayers are with the families of those who were lost, with President Calderón, and with the Mexican people. The United States worked closely with those who were lost in this crash and considered them to be close partners, and know that they were strong public servants for the Mexican people. And the President reinforced his commitment to the close partnership between the United States and Mexico in this difficult time and committed to stay in close touch with President Calderón going forward."
- United Nations (Translation): "The news filled us with dismay... [and we] respectfully unite in the national mourning."
- Mexico – The president of Mexico, Felipe Calderón, said that Blake Mora was not only an exceptional public servant, but also was an "exceptional Mexican." They gave a speech and said that Mexico had lost a "great patriot and a good friend," and promised to work to the best of his abilities to bring the causes of the accident and bring transparency.
- The National Action Party remembered that Blake Mora was a "politician of huge trajectory." "We reiterate our trust in the Federal government to lead the investigations of Blake Mora's death."
- The Institutional Revolutionary Party asked for a transparent investigation and clear reasons to uncover the unfortunate incident.
- The Party of the Democratic Revolution sent its condolences to Blake Mora's family and those of the passengers killed. They awaited the upcoming results of the investigations.
- The Ecologist Green Party of Mexico expressed its condolences to the president Felipe Calderón for the irreparable loss of a "close collaborator" and good friend of his. They affirmed their unity in the national mourning.

=== Controversy ===
The question of whether this incident was a mere coincidence or a conspiracy has been discussed in numerous newspapers, blogs, and other internet sites. However, President Calderón has tried to quell any suggestions of sabotage, saying Blake Mora's helicopter "was always under guard" in the hangar of Mexico's equivalent of the Secret Service and that it had recently undergone maintenance. Before Blake Mora, Juan Camilo Mouriño, who was also head of the Interior, was killed in an airplane accident on 4 November 2008, with the presidential security adviser Jose Luis Vasconcelos and six other officials. And on 21 September 2005, Ramón Martín Huerta, the former Public Security Secretary, also died in a helicopter accident with José Antonio Bernal, who worked for the Human Rights Commission, Tomás Valencia, head chief of the Federal Police in Mexico, and six other officials. Although not proven, these high-profile deaths have fueled speculations on whether they were foul plays by the drug cartels.

Moreover, the death of Blake Mora and the seven others in a helicopter crash puts into relevance the fact that Mexico has no law or protocol that would prevent senior officials from flying in the same aircraft, as in other governments worldwide, to preserve the integrity of government and decision makers. Mexican law has no protocols to prevent the president or his cabinet, including members of the Legislature or the Judiciary, from travelling in the same vehicle for security reasons. In addition, CNN México announced that soon after the death of Mexico's interior secretary, one Twitter user posted on Blake Mora's page a day before his death caught the attention of the media. At the time of the plane crash, only 14 hours had passed since the tweet was posted. One individual under the username @Morf0 posted the following message on Blake Mora's Twitter page:

Tomorrow at 11:11 a Secretary will fall from the sky ... avoid Reforma.

Nevertheless, the man that posted the Twitter message was interviewed through a phone call on live television, and claimed that his tweet was a prank among a community of internet surfers that were attempting to make predictions online. On another note, Hiram Fernando Escobar said his brother Pedro, co-pilot of the aircraft, told him two days before the incident that the helicopter was not ready to travel on Friday, the day he crashed in a mountainous area south of Mexico City. Pedro Escobar allegedly told his brother that the helicopter was "not well" and presented signs of failure. In addition, the helicopter, an Aérospatiale Super Puma, was bought from a casino in the United States in 1985, and had been used for governmental purposes in Mexico since 1987. The controversy lies on the idea that the helicopter was "out-of-date" and that it was bought with a considerable amount of flight hours.

=== Investigations ===
Aeronautic specialists from United States, Mexico, and France, along with Eurocopter, assisted the Mexican government in investigating the helicopter accident that killed Blake Mora. President Calderon has solicited help from the National Transportation Safety Board, a U.S. agency specialized in aviation accidents, as well as France's BEA to work together in the investigation regarding the secretary's death. Experts in the Mexican Air Force will also be aiding in the investigations. After preliminary investigation and visual contacts of the accident, the wreckage did not show any damage caused by an explosion or fire, which has made investigators deduce that the collision was due to poor visibility. Investigations by the Secretariat of Communications and Transportation prove that the pilot of the helicopter did not lose control of the aircraft. Initial investigations show that the coordinates of where accident occurred coincide with the last record taken by the helicopter's radar. Moreover, government sources mention that the pilot of the helicopter took a different route in an attempt to escape the cloudiness and find a lower and more visible trajectory to their destination, but eventually wrecked in a hill known as Ayaqueme, situated in the municipality of Chalco.

Forensic investigations and autopsies show that "...all (the deaths) were (caused by) traumas," since the bodies came very complete, and doctors mention that the cause of death of all occupants of the helicopter was due to a very severe impact. Moreover, experts mention that if the helicopter had flown 200 feet (60 meters) higher or 300 meters further south, the helicopter would have not crashed. The reasons why the pilot decided to fly over 200 miles per hour against the mainland, without opening the landing gear, still remains a mystery.

=== Aftermath ===
After Blake's death, his functions as Secretary of the Interior were temporarily assumed by the Secretary of Government, Juan Marcos Gutiérrez, while President Calderón appointed a new secretary. Several academics and journalists from the National Autonomous University of Mexico, the Monterrey Institute of Technology and Higher Education, the Universidad Veracruzana, and CNN México have debated the possible impacts Blake Mora's death can have on Mexico's drug policy and politics. In addition, CNN has sponsored tweets on Twitter and forum discussions on Facebook through the program known as Mexico Opina to allow people to debate and analyze the causes and consequences of Blake Mora's death.

Felipe Calderón, the president of Mexico, named Alejandro Poiré Romero as the new interior minister, six days after the previous head of the agency, Francisco Blake Mora, died in a helicopter accident.

=== Legacy ===
Felipe Calderón inaugurated a boulevard in Tijuana, Baja California called "José Francisco Blake Mora" on 11 October 2012.

== Personal life ==
According to information published by sources of Baja California, Blake Mora used to go to Mass every Sunday with his family and spend all day together, and share important dates, like Father's Day, with his loved ones. In addition, he used to spend quality time fishing, a hobby his father taught him when he was young.

Political offices
Preceded by Fernando Gómez Mont	Secretary of the Interior; 14 July 2010 – 11 November 2011	Succeeded by Alejandro Poiré Romero
