= Alejandro Poiré Romero =

Mexican politician

Alejandro Poiré
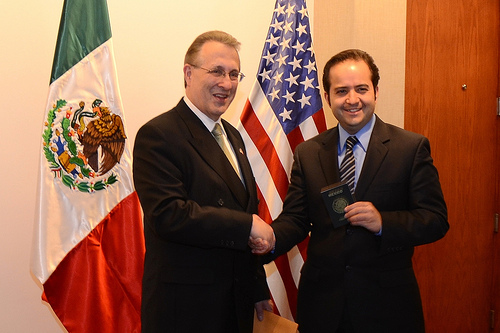
- Alejandro Poiré (right) enrolls on the Global Entry.

Secretary of the Interior of Mexico
- In office 17 November 2011 – 1 December 2012
- President: Felipe Calderón
- Preceded by: Francisco Blake Mora
- Succeeded by: Miguel Ángel Osorio Chong

Personal details
- Born: Alejandro Poiré Romero; 1971 (age 54–55) Mexico City, Mexico
- Education: Mexico's Autonomous Institute of Technology, Harvard University
- Profession: Politician
- Cabinet: Felipe Calderón
- Website: presidencia.gob.mx

Alejandro Poiré Romero (Spanish pronunciation: [aleˈxandɾo pwaˈɾe roˈmeɾo]; born January 15, 1971) is a Mexican politician who served as the Secretary of the Interior in the cabinet of Felipe Calderón from 17 November 2011 to 1 December 2012, following the death of Francisco Blake Mora in a helicopter crash on 11 November 2011.

Before his post as the Secretary of the Interior, Poiré served as spokesman of Mexico's national security in the cabinet of Felipe Calderón. He is often regarded as the face and voice of Mexico's strategy against drug trafficking and organized crime. Moreover, Poiré has the task of telling Mexicans—and the world—the government's strategy in the fight against the drug cartels and organized crime in the country's drug war. He has worked in many operatives against organized crime, and he strengthened the security in Tamaulipas. He has published several studies on democratization, public opinion and political parties; in addition, he has lectured in several universities in Mexico, the United States, Latin America and Europe. Most of his work can be read in Reforma, Milenio, Milenio Semanal, Hoja por Hoja, Letras Libres, Cambio, Nexos and other newspapers.

== Career ==
Alejandro Poiré was born in Mexico City in 1971. He holds a bachelor's degree in political science from Mexico's Autonomous Institute of Technology, where he served as head of the department for four years, and a doctoral degree from Harvard University. In addition, while serving as spokesman for Mexico's national security, Poiré serves as the director-general of the Ministry of Public Safety and the CISEN. He has also been a professor at the Massachusetts Institute of Technology, Stanford University, Robert F. Kennedy and John F. Kennedy School of Government in Harvard University, and as director of the Federal Electoral Institute and INEGI, where he helped the realization of the Primera Encuesta Nacional de Cultura Política y Prácticas Ciudadanas. On 26 May 2010, Poiré was named undersecretary of the Office of Population, Migration, and Religious Affairs, and later formed part of the Federal Public Administration.

In 2013, Poiré was named head of the Escuela de Gobierno y Transformación Pública and the Instituto de Administración Pública of the Monterrey Institute of Technology and Higher Education. He is also a member of the advisory board for the Mexico Institute at the Woodrow Center.

== See also ==
- List of Monterrey Institute of Technology and Higher Education faculty

Political offices
Preceded by Francisco Blake Mora	Secretary of the Interior; 2011–2012	Succeeded by Miguel Ángel Osorio Chong
