= Embassy of Mexico, London =

Embassy of Mexico in London
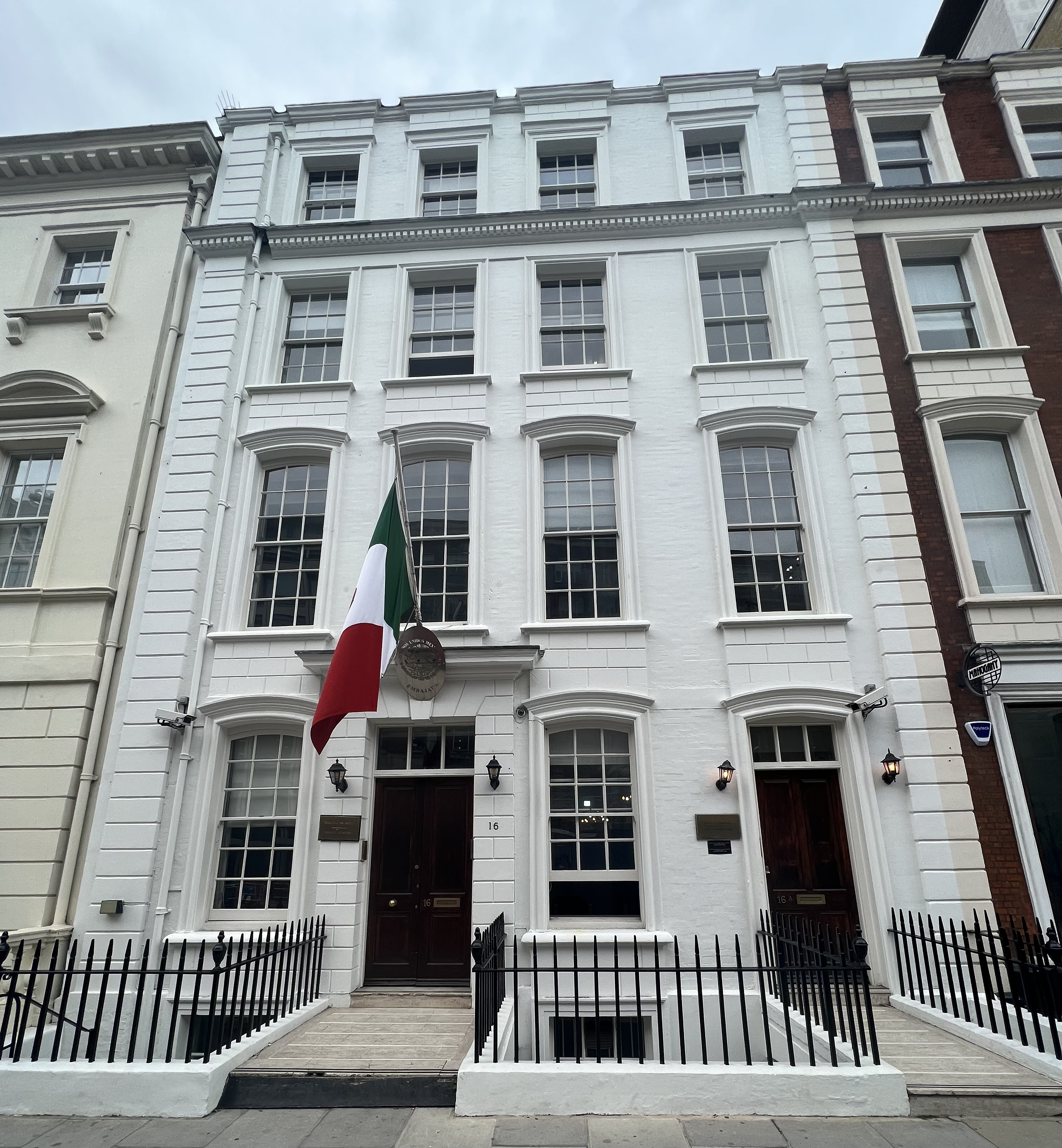
- Location: Mayfair, London
- Address: 16 St. George Street, London, W1S 1FD
- Coordinates: 51.5129°N 0.1436°W
- Ambassador: Josefa González-Blanco

The Embassy of Mexico in London is the diplomatic mission of Mexico in the United Kingdom. Mexico also maintains a building at 8 Halkin Street in Belgravia which serves as the Ambassador’s Official Residence.

In 2011 a pro-Zapatista demonstration was held at the embassy, with the Mexican tricolour being replaced with the Zapatista flag.

The embassy building in St George's Street, together with its neighbour, is Grade II listed.

== Ambassador ==
The Ambassador of Mexico to the Court of St James's is the highest ranking diplomatic representative of the United Mexican States to the United Kingdom.

Diplomatic representatives of Mexico to the Court of St James's
Name	Rank	Appointment	Credentials	End of mission
José Mariano Michelena	Confidential agent	26 March 1824	27 June 1824	7 July 1825
Vicente Rocafuerte	Chargé d'affaires	6 July 1825	—N/a	26 December 1826
Tomás Murphy	Chargé d'affaires	26 December 1826	—N/a	23 May 1827
Vicente Rocafuerte	Chargé d'affaires	19 July 1827	—N/a	18 September 1829
Manuel Eduardo de Gorostiza	Chargé d'affaires	4 June 1829	—N/a	25 August 1830
Manuel Eduardo de Gorostiza	Envoy	29 August 1830	10 November 1830	14 May 1833
José Máximo Garro	Envoy	12 April 1833	28 August 1833	6 May 1835
Miguel Santa María	Envoy	30 January 1835	24 June 1835	23 April 1837
Agustín de Iturbide y Huarte	Chargé d'affaires ad interim	27 August 1835	—N/a	26 May 1838
Juan Nepomuceno Almonte	Chargé d'affaires ad interim	26 May 1838	8 June 1838	27 October 1838
José Máximo Garro	Envoy	17 August 1838	29 November 1838	27 July 1839
Tomás Murphy	Chargé d'affaires ad interim	28 May 1839	24 July 1839	2 October 1842
Tomás Murphy	Envoy	2 October 1842	1 March 1843	28 August 1846
José María Mendoza	Chargé d'affaires ad interim	28 September 1846	21 December 1846	22 March 1847
José María Luis Mora	Envoy	29 December 1846	28 March 1847	14 July 1850
José María Mendoza	Chargé d'affaires ad interim	14 July 1850	—N/a	3 April 1851
Francisco Facio	Chargé d'affaires ad interim	26 July 1851	27 October 1851	9 July 1853
Joaquín María del Castillo y Lanzas	Envoy	29 May 1853	8 August 1853	6 December 1855
José María González de la Vega	Chargé d'affaires ad interim	31 October 1855	—N/a	13 December 1856
Juan Nepomuceno Almonte	Envoy	28 April 1856	15 December 1856	9 August 1858
Tomás Murphy	Envoy	25 May 1858	29 October 1858	28 January 1861[12]
Francisco de Arrangoiz	Envoy	5 August 1864	10 November 1864	4 August 1865
José María Durán	Envoy	9 October 1865	s/d	1 January 1867
Ángel Núñez de Ortega	Chargé d'affaires ad interim	1 January 1867	—N/a	25 April 1867
Juan Nepomuceno Almonte	Envoy	10 February 1867	25 April 1867	21 May 1867
Ignacio Mariscal	Envoy	29 May 1883	22 August 1883	6 August 1884
Ignacio Mariscal	Envoy	4 October 1884	10 December 1884	20 December 1884
Pablo Martínez del Campo	Chargé d'affaires ad interim	18 December 1884	24 December 1884	13 May 1887
Francisco Zacarías Mena	Envoy	8 November 1886	13 May 1887	29 June 1888
Pablo Martínez del Campo	Chargé d'affaires ad interim	29 June 1888	—N/a	3 July 1892
Benito Gómez Farías	Envoy	31 May 1892	26 November 1892	18 August 1893
Cayetano Romero	Chargé d'affaires ad interim	18 August 1893	—N/a	20 November 1894
Manuel de Yturbe y del Villar	Envoy	6 October 1894	20 November 1894	18 April 1899
Cayetano Romero	Chargé d'affaires ad interim	18 April 1899	—N/a	2 March 1900
Sebastián Bernardo de Mier	Envoy	18 October 1899	14 March 1900	21 June 1901
Cayetano Romero	Chargé d'affaires ad interim	5 June 1901	—N/a	10 November 1901
Alfonso Lancaster Jones	Envoy	23 October 1901	11 February 1902	25 May 1903
Pedro Rincón Gallardo y Terreros	Envoy	23 April 1903	9 October 1903	17 April 1907
Miguel Covarrubias	Envoy	15 May 1907	26 October 1907	5 June 1911
Miguel de Béistegui y Septién	Envoy	15 June 1911	8 August 1911	31 May 1912
Miguel Covarrubias	Envoy	12 April 1912	11 June 1912	7 March 1913
Bartolomé Carbajal y Rosas	Envoy	27 February 1913	21 July 1913	17 September 1914
Miguel Covarrubias	Confidential agent	28 February 1914	—N/a	5 September 1914
Miguel Covarrubias	Chargé d'affaires	5 September 1914	17 September 1914	13 January 1915
Isidro Fabela Alfaro	Confidential agent	1 May 1915	—N/a	4 August 1915
Juan Sánchez-Azcona y Díaz Covarrubias	Confidential agent	4 August 1915	—N/a	21 October 1915
Félix Fulgencio Palavicini	Confidential agent	14 June 1920	22 July 1920	23 July 1920
Miguel Covarrubias	Envoy	1 August 1920	23 October 1920	17 April 1921
Juan Francisco Urquidi	Archivist	26 February 1921	—N/a	22 September 1922
Alberto Mascareñas	Archivist	22 September 1922	—N/a	29 October 1924
Gilberto Valenzuela Galindo	Envoy	23 September 1925	7 November 1925	15 January 1929
Leopoldo Ortiz Liebich	Envoy	16 January 1929	26 March 1929	7 August 1932
Alberto Mascareñas	Envoy	27 May 1932	23 July 1932	20 January 1934
Javier Sánchez Mejorada	Envoy	20 January 1934	13 March 1934	31 December 1934
Leónides Andrew Almazán	Envoy	1 January 1935	19 February 1935	3 December 1935
Narciso Bassols García	Envoy	1 January 1936	13 March 1936	4 January 1937
Primo Villa Michel	Envoy	1 February 1937	11 March 1937	1 November 1938
Gustavo Luders de Negri	Archivist	13 May 1938	—N/a	11 November 1941
José Maximiliano Alfonso de Rosenzweig Díaz	Envoy	1 November 1941	22 January 1942	16 February 1944
José Maximiliano Alfonso de Rosenzweig Díaz	Ambassador	16 February 1944	20 April 1944	20 October 1945
Federico Jiménez O'Farril	Ambassador	1 November 1945	15 February 1946	4 October 1951
Francisco Asís de Icaza y León	Ambassador	21 January 1952	11 March 1952	15 April 1955
Gustavo Luders de Negri	Chargé d'affaires ad interim	18 May 1955	—N/a	16 July 1957
Pablo Campos Ortiz	Ambassador	1 June 1957	24 July 1957	16 May 1960
Gustavo Luders de Negri	Chargé d'affaires ad interim	16 May 1960	—N/a	22 December 1960
Antonio Armendariz Cárdenas	Ambassador	1 September 1960	18 January 1961	6 February 1965
Eduardo Suárez Aranzolo	Ambassador	1 March 1965	4 May 1965	4 September 1970
Vicente Sánchez Gavito	Ambassador	12 August 1970	25 November 1970	25 July 1973
Hugo B. Margáin Gleason	Ambassador	1 July 1973	7 August 1973	7 December 1976
Manuel Tello Macías	Ambassador	29 December 1976	16 March 1977	15 June 1979
Héctor Cárdenas Rodríguez	Chargé d'affaires ad interim	20 June 1979	—N/a	13 January 1980
José Juan de Olloqui y Labastida	Ambassador	8 November 1979	21 February 1980	5 November 1982
Francisco Cuevas Cancino	Ambassador	18 January 1983	1 February 1983	7 January 1986
Jorge Eduardo Navarrete López	Ambassador	5 November 1985	14 February 1986	21 March 1989
Bernardo Sepúlveda Amor	Ambassador	17 January 1989	9 March 1989	1 March 1993
José Juan de Olloqui y Labastida	Ambassador	23 July 1993	28 October 1993	31 December 1994
Andrés Rozental Gutman	Ambassador	25 December 1994	4 May 1995	20 April 1997
Santiago Oñate Laborde	Ambassador	4 April 1997	4 June 1997	20 February 2001
Alma Rosa Moreno Razo	Ambassador	30 January 2001	s/d	February 2004
Juan José Bremer	Ambassador	8 January 2004	18 March 2004	30 November 2009
Eduardo Medina-Mora Icaza	Ambassador	10 November 2009	23 February 2010	December 2012
Diego Antonio Gómez Pickering	Ambassador	4 December 2013	13 May 2014	2016
Julián Ventura Valero	Ambassador	7 March 2017	13 March 2017	15 December 2018
Josefa González Blanco Ortiz Mena	Ambassador	23 April 2021	9 June 2021	26 January 2026
Alejandro Gertz Manero	Ambassador	26 January 2026	6 May 2026	

== Gallery ==
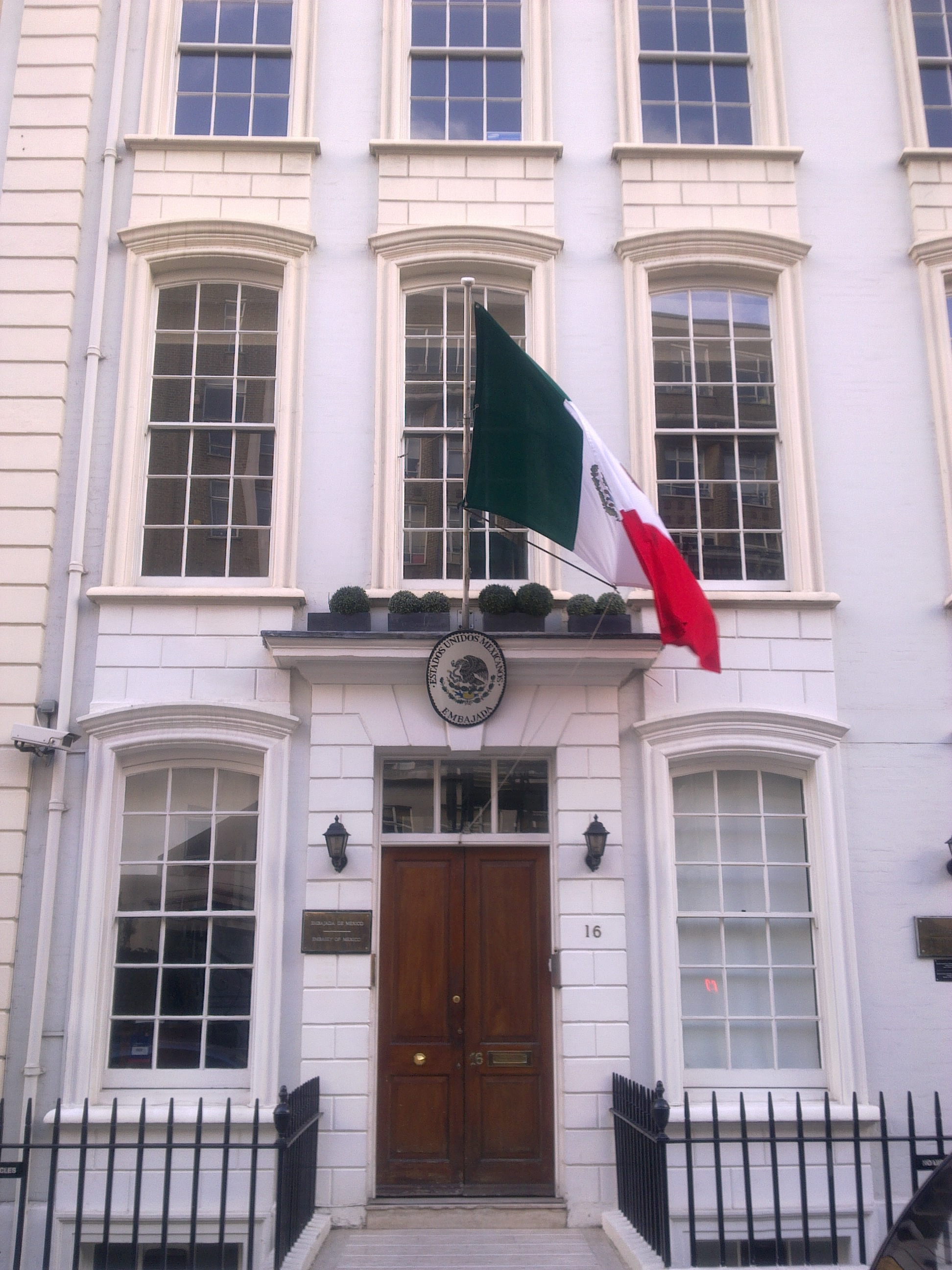
The Embassy

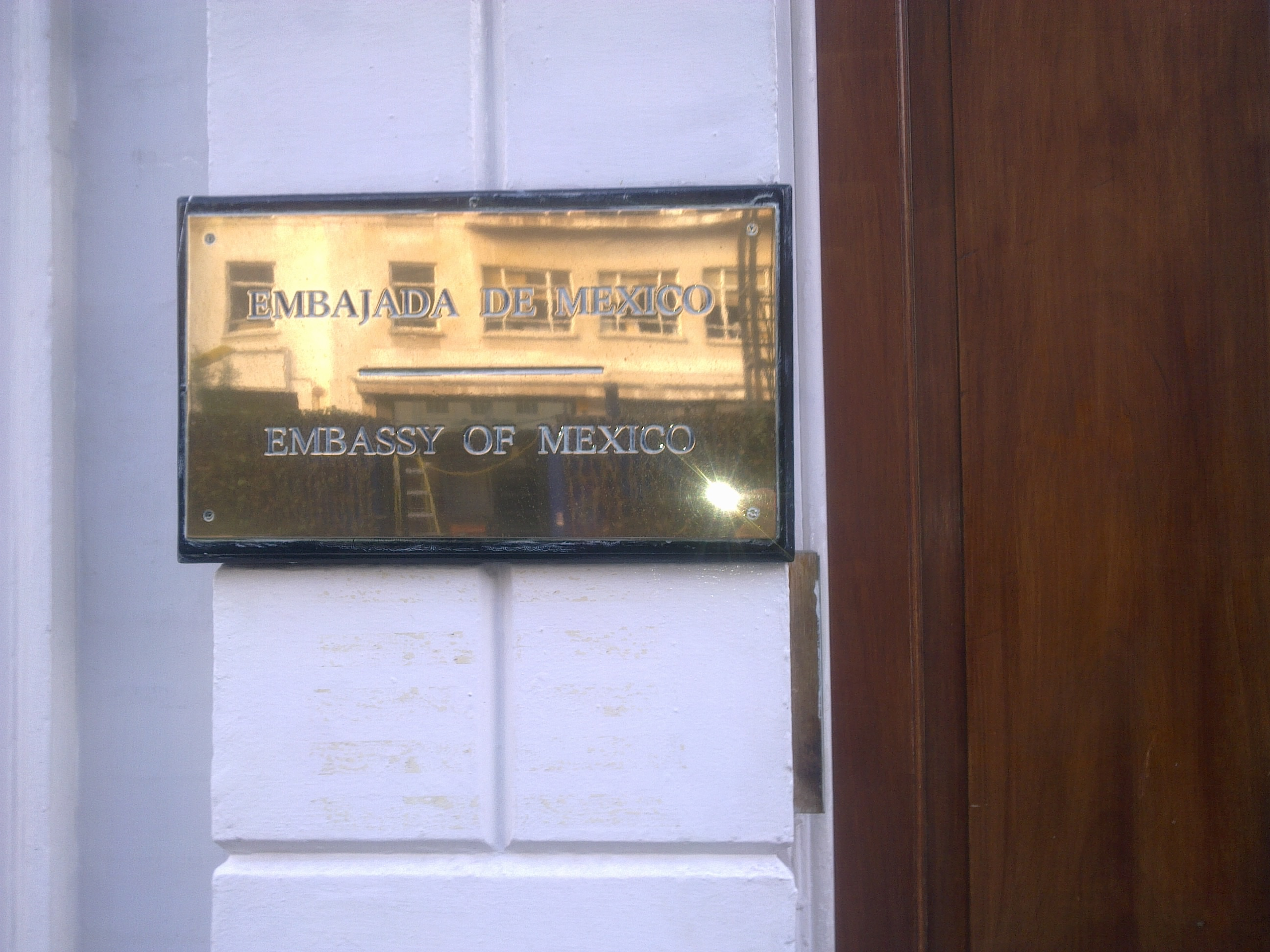
Plaque outside the embassy in English and Spanish

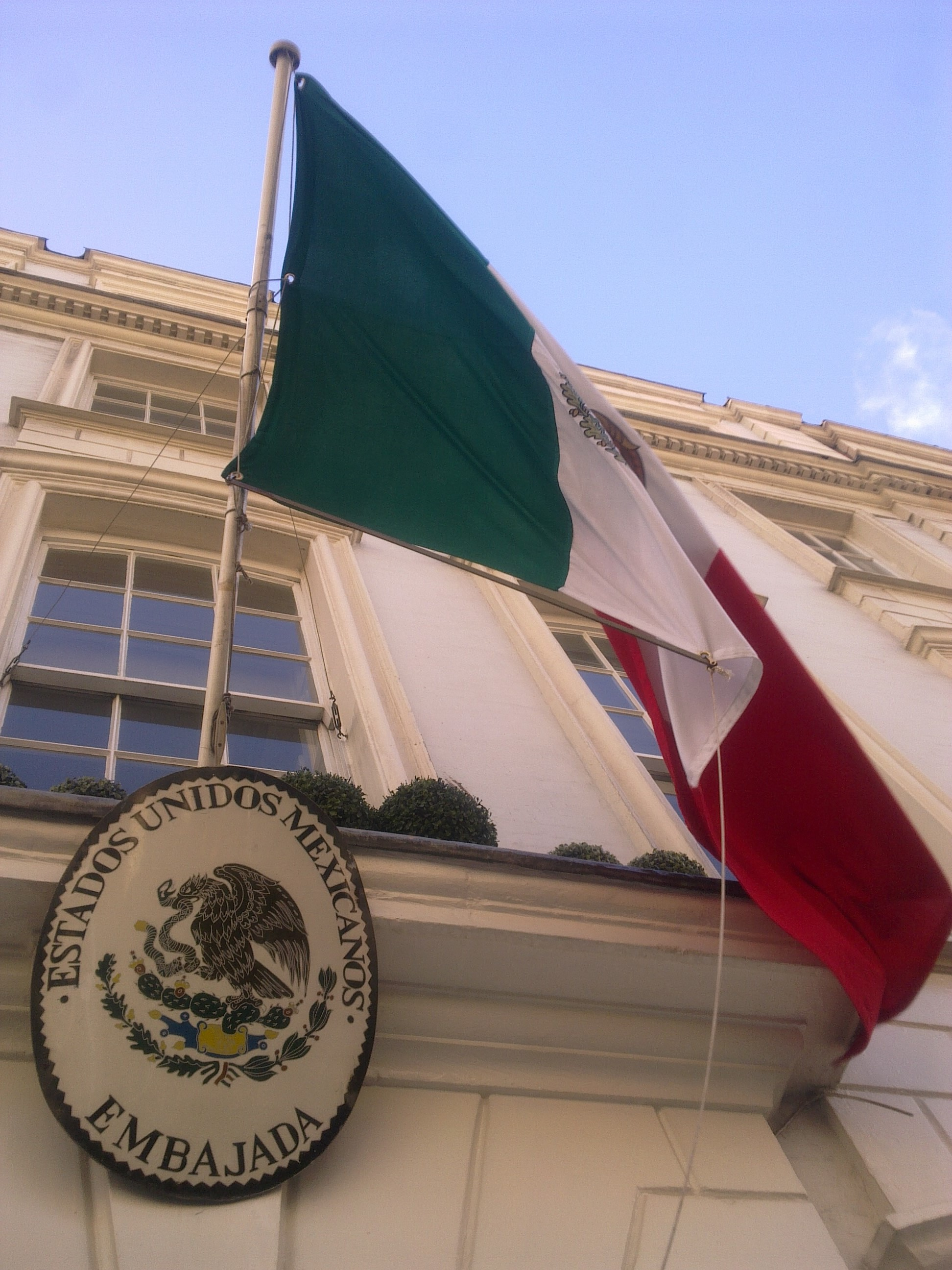
The Mexican flag and Coat of arms above the entrance

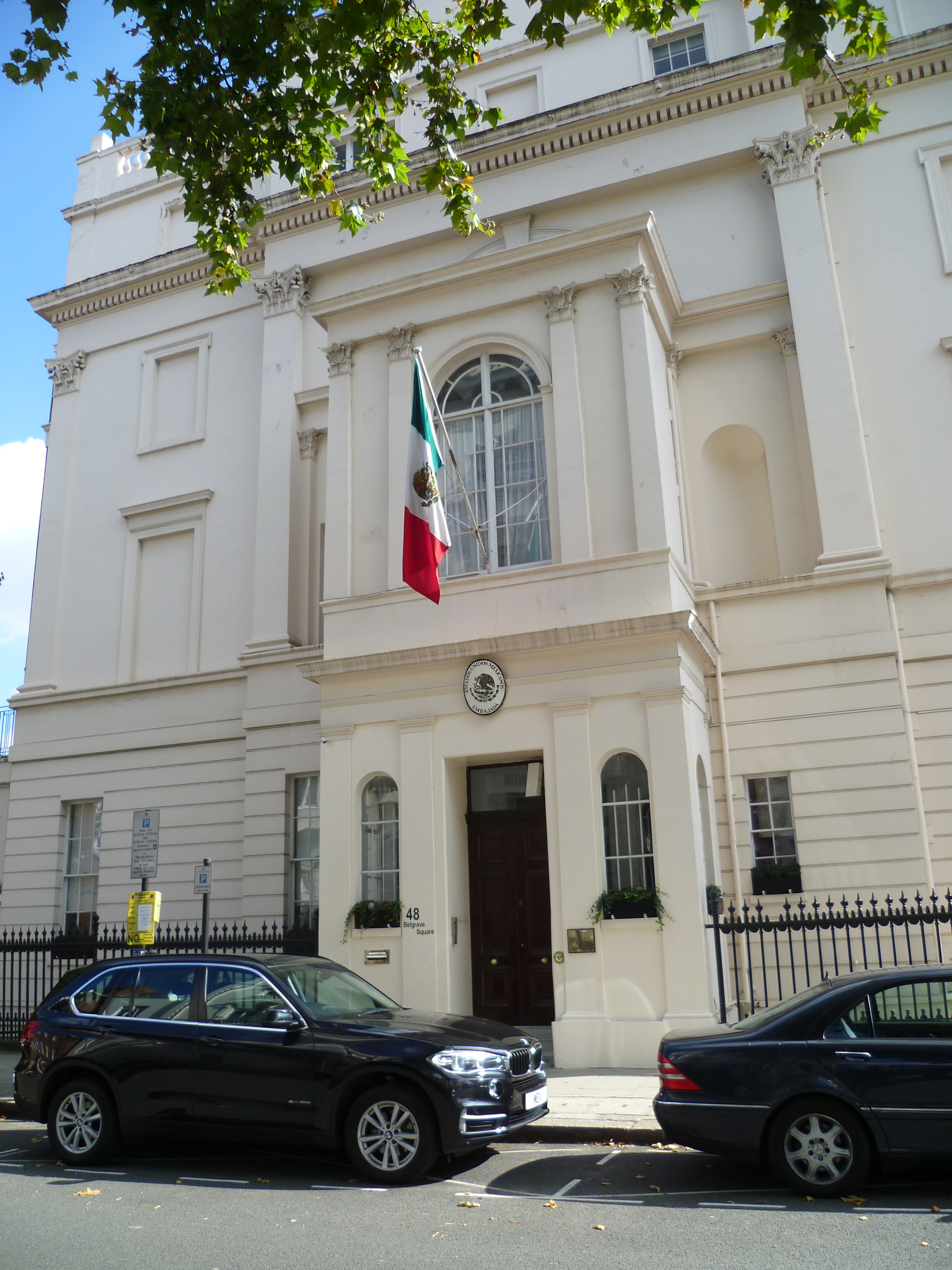
Residence of the Mexican Ambassador in London

== See also ==
- Foreign relations of Mexico
- List of diplomatic missions of Mexico
- Secretariat of Foreign Affairs
