= Urquidi =

Urquidi is a Basque surname. Notable people with the surname include:

- José Urquidy (born 1995), Mexican baseball player
- Juan Francisco Urquidi (1881–1938), Mexican politician and diplomat
- Víctor Urquidi (1919–2004), Mexican economist
