= Alejandro Gertz Manero =

Mexican lawyer and politician (born 1939)

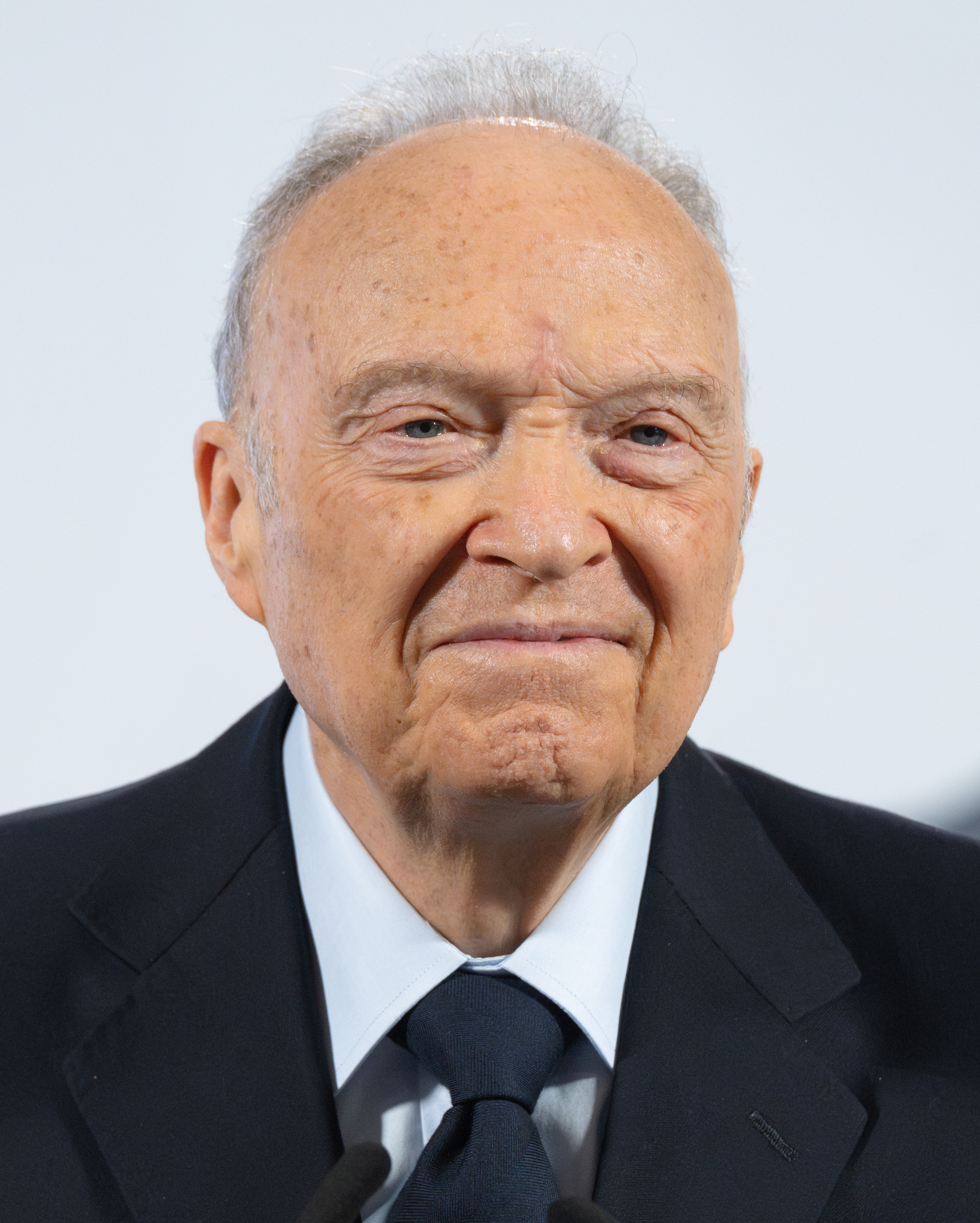
- Gertz Manero in 2025

Ambassador of Mexico to the United Kingdom
- Incumbent
- Assumed office 26 January 2026
- President: Claudia Sheinbaum
- Preceded by: Josefa González-Blanco Ortiz-Mena

Attorney General of Mexico
- In office 18 January 2019 – 27 November 2025
- Preceded by: Office established
- Succeeded by: Ernestina Godoy Ramos

Prosecutor General of Mexico
- Acting; 1 December 2018 – 18 January 2019
- President: Andrés Manuel López Obrador
- Preceded by: Alberto Elías Beltrán
- Succeeded by: Office abolished

1st Secretary of Public Security
- In office 1 December 2000 – 3 June 2004
- President: Vicente Fox
- Preceded by: Office established
- Succeeded by: Ramón Martín Huerta
Other offices
Member of the Chamber of Deputies
In office 1 September 2009 – 31 August 2012
Constituency	Fifth electoral region
Secretary of Citizen Security of Mexico City
In office 29 August 1998 – 4 December 2000
Preceded by	Rodolfo Debernardi Debernardi
Succeeded by	Leonel Godoy Rangel

Personal details
- Born: 31 October 1939 (age 87) Mexico City, Mexico
- Party: Independent (Note: Although Gertz Manero was part of the Convergence parliamentary group during the 61st Legislature of the Mexican Congress, he was not formally a member of the party.)
- Education: Escuela Libre de Derecho (LLB); National Autonomous University of Mexico (PhD)
- Profession: Lawyer and politician

Alejandro Gertz Manero (Note: In this Mexican name, the surname is Gertz and the second or maternal family name is Manero.) (born 31 October 1939) is a Mexican lawyer and politician. He served as secretary of public security from 2000 to 2004 during the first part of Vicente Fox's government. In the 2009 mid-term election, he was elected to a plurinominal seat in the Chamber of Deputies. He later served as attorney general under Andrés Manuel López Obrador and Claudia Sheinbaum from 2019 until his resignation in November 2025.

On 7 January 2026, President Sheinbaum announced her intention for Gertz Manero to be appointed ambassador to the United Kingdom. He presented his letters of credence to King Charles III on 6 May 2026.

== Controversies ==
In 2021 he was admitted to the National Researchers System by a special committee, after having tried unsuccessfully for 11 years due to insufficient scientific output. Writer Guillermo Sheridan showed evidence of plagiarism in a biography of Guillermo Prieto published by Gertz Manero, which was also reported by a group of 77 researchers.

In 2022 he was accused of abusing his position as federal attorney general for a personal vendetta, illegally persecuting and jailing Alejandra Cuevas and Laura Morán for the death of his brother Federico Gertz in 2015. He was accused of influence trafficking and criminal association by the former Counsel to the President, Julio Scherer Ibarra. He owns several real estate properties in Madrid, Ibiza, Paris, New York, and Los Angeles, and bought 122 luxury vehicles.

When he was secretary of public security in the government of president Vicente Fox, Gertz Manero was detained by DEA and ATF when he landed in New York in an official government plane, carrying a false passport and US$50,000 in cash. In 2022 the US government opened another investigation on him.

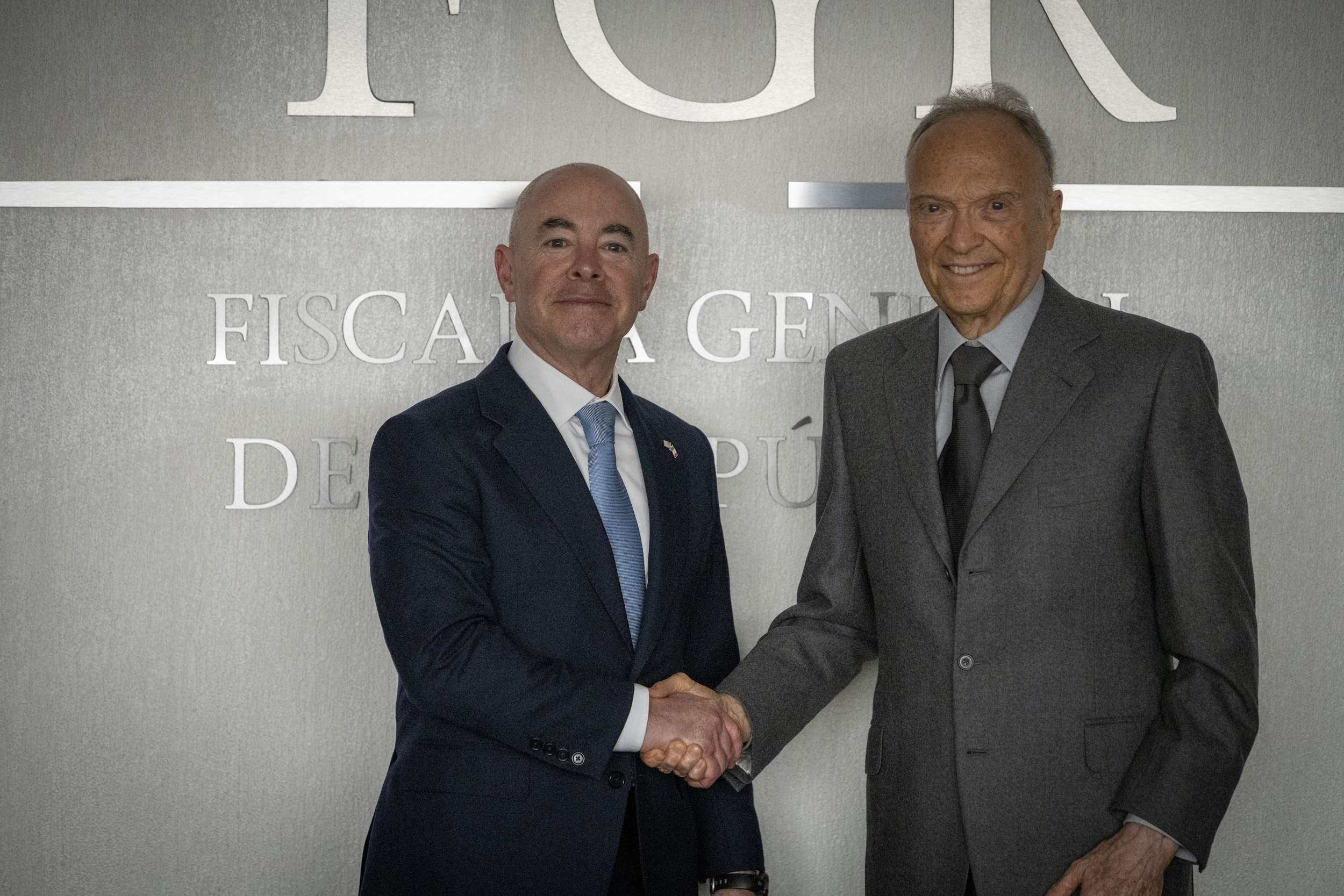
Gertz Manero meets with U.S. Homeland Security Secretary Alejandro Mayorkas at FGR Headquarters in Mexico City in June 2021.

== Notes ==
Political offices
Preceded by New office	Secretary of Public Security; 2000–2004	Succeeded by Ramón Martín Huerta
Preceded by Alberto Elías Beltrán	Attorney General of Mexico; 2018–2025	Succeeded by Ernestina Godoy Ramos
