= Julián Ventura Valero =

Mexican diplomat

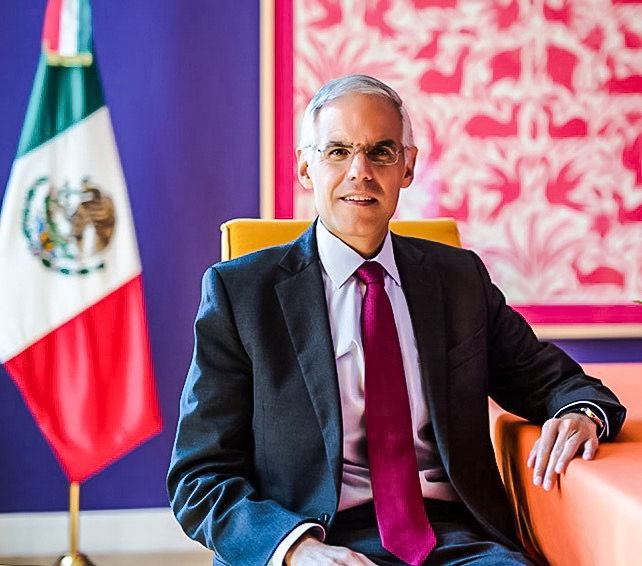

Deputy Secretary of Foreign Affairs of Mexico
- In office 1 December 2018 – 1 January 2020
- President: Andrés Manuel López Obrador
- Succeeded by: Carmen Moreno Toscano

Mexican Ambassador to the United Kingdom
- In office 7 March 2017 – 15 December 2018
- President: Enrique Peña Nieto
- Preceded by: Diego Gómez Pickering
- Succeeded by: Josefa González Blanco Ortiz Mena

Personal details
- Born: 15 May 1966 (age 60) Tampico, Tamaulipas, Mexico
- Education: University of British Columbia
- Occupation: Diplomat

Julián Ventura Valero (born 15 May 1966) is a Mexican diplomat, who served as Deputy Secretary of Foreign Affairs of Mexico from December 2018 to January 2020, G-20 Sherpa, and Chair of the Matías Romero Institute, the foreign ministry's diplomatic Academy.

He joined the Mexican Foreign Service in 1990 and was appointed to the rank of career ambassador in 2006.

In the Mexican Ministry of Foreign Affairs he has served as undersecretary for North American affairs (2009-2012); director-general for Asia-Pacific affairs (2003-2007); chief of cabinet of the secretary of foreign affairs (2002-2003); and chief of cabinet of the deputy secretary for African, Asia-Pacific, Europe, Middle Eastern and United Nations affairs (2001-2002).

Abroad, he has served as ambassador to the United Kingdom (2017-2018); ambassador to the People’s Republic of China (2013-2017); deputy chief of mission in the embassy to the United States of America (2007-2009); alternate representative to the Organization of American States (1998-2001); head of political and media affairs in the embassy in Cuba (1995-1998); and alternate representative to the international organizations in Vienna, Austria (1990-1995).

Over the course of his diplomatic career he has represented Mexico in numerous multilateral conferences in the United Nations, the Inter-American System, APEC, the World Forum on Migration and Development and the G-20.

He holds a degree in history from the University of British Columbia (Vancouver, Canada).

== Publications ==
- "México en la Región Asia-Pacífico, Prioridad Ineludible", Foreign Affairs en Español, Mexico, volumen 7, núm. 1, enero-marzo de 2007.
- "La política exterior de México en Asia-Pacífico en el período 2000-2006", Revista Mexicana de Política Exterior, Mexico, Instituto Matías Romero, núms. 79-80, junio de 2007.

https://revistadigital.sre.gob.mx/images/stories/numeros/n79-80/ventura.pdf

- "China y Japón: Socios Estratégicos para México", Laura Rubio Díaz Leal (coord.), China y Japón: modernización económica, cambio político y posicionamiento mundial, Mexico, ITAM, Senado de la República, Editorial Porrúa, 2008.
- "Presente y futuro de México en América del Norte", en Foreign Policy (edición mexicana), Mexico, vol. 1, núm. 1, diciembre de 2011-enero de 2012.
- "Relaciones gubernamentales entre Canadá y México", en Alex Bugailiskis y Andrés Rozental (eds.), Canadá entre las naciones 2011-2012. Canada and Mexico: La Agenda Pendiente, Canada, Carleton University, 2012. http://ru.micisan.unam.mx/bitstream/handle/123456789/21477/L0092-RELACIONES_GUBERNAMENTALES-43.pdf?sequence=1&isAllowed=y
- "Relaciones económicas México-China: Una agenda de oportunidades", Julián Ventura y Rodirigo Meléndez Armada, Revista de Política Exterior, Instituto Matías Romero, Núm.108, septiembre-diciembre de 2016, Mexico https://revistadigital.sre.gob.mx/images/stories/numeros/n108/venturamelendrez.pdf

=== Articles and Editorials ===
- What Biden, Trudeau and López Obrador can do for you. Dallas Morning News, 18.11.21.

https://www.dallasnews.com/opinion/commentary/2021/11/18/what-biden-trudeau-and-lopez-obrador-can-do-for-you/

- Los 20 en el 21. Reforma, 03.11.21.

https://reforma.com/GfF8Or/los-20-en-el-21/

- Rumbo norteamericano. Reforma, 27.09.21.

https://reforma.com/2L21er

- Afganistán y las potencias: primera radiografía. Revista Nexos, 27.08.21.

https://www.nexos.com.mx/?p=60101

- Afganistán: Las vueltas del tiempo. Reforma, 17.08.21.

https://reforma.com/ivpRbr

- Biden: seis meses. Reforma, 27.07.21.

https://reforma.com/xOhCDr

- North America should use the USMCA trade agreement to leverage influence around the world. Dallas Morning News, 19.07.21.

https://www.dallasnews.com/opinion/commentary/2021/07/19/north-america-should-use-the-usmca-trade-agreement-to-leverage-influence-around-the-world/

- In Latin America, President Biden should play the long game. Dallas Morning News, 22.06.21.

https://www.dallasnews.com/opinion/commentary/2021/06/21/in-latin-america-president-biden-should-play-the-long-game/

- Las Pandemias del Porvenir. Reforma, 24.01.21.

https://reforma.com/1NW2Ar

- The road back to effective multilateralism: A view from Mexico. America’s Global Role: The View from Abroad. Chatham House. 09.02.21.

https://americas.chathamhouse.org/article/road-back-to-multilateralism-view-from-mexico/

- México en el G20: Solidaridad global para una recuperación inclusiva. El Universal, 24.11.20.

https://www.eluniversal.com.mx/opinion/julian-ventura/mexico-en-el-g20-solidaridad-global-para-una-recuperacion-inclusiva

- Cooperación en tiempos de crisis: México en el G20. Milenio, 30.03.20.

https://www.milenio.com/opinion/julian-ventura/columna-julian-ventura/cooperacion-en-tiempos-de-crisis-mexico-en-el-g20

- Mexico and Qatar: 45 years of friendship and collaboration. The Peninsula, 01.07.20.

https://www.thepeninsulaqatar.com/opinion/01/07/2020/Mexico-and-Qatar-45-years-of-friendship-and-collaboration

- La diversificación inteligente de la presencia global de México. Excelsior, 03.12.19.

https://www.excelsior.com.mx/opinion/columnista-invitado-nacional/la-diversificacion-inteligente-de-la-presencia-global-de-mexico

- Alianza transpacífica. Reforma, 20.11.19.

https://reforma.com/ILq0V2NMMMfr

- México e India: Mirando hacia el futuro. El Universal, 08.10.19.

https://www.eluniversal.com.mx/opinion/julian-ventura/mexico-e-india-mirando-hacia-el-futuro

- Mexico and Ethiopia: Building upon 70 years of friendship. The Reporter, 05.10.19.

https://www.thereporterethiopia.com/article/mexico-and-ethiopia-building-upon-70-years-friendship

- Alcance global. Reforma, 12.09.19.

https://reforma.com/zVVDppD0kyXr

- Mexico and Ghana working together for stronger relationship. GhanaWeb, 21.08.19.

https://www.ghanaweb.com/GhanaHomePage/NewsArchive/Mexico-and-Ghana-working-together-for-stronger-relationship-773874

- México en África: abriendo nuevos espacios de oportunidad. La Razón, 19.08.19

https://www.razon.com.mx/archivo/sin-categoria/mexico-en-africa-abriendo-nuevos-espacios-de-oportunidad/

- México y Reino Unido: Una firme asociación en un contexto global cambiante. El Universal, 08.08.19.

https://www.eluniversal.com.mx/julian-ventura/mexico-y-reino-unido-una-firme-asociacion-en-un-contexto-global-cambiante

- La nueva agenda de México en Beijing. El Universal, 30.06.19.

https://www.eluniversal.com.mx/articulo/julian-ventura/nacion/la-nueva-agenda-de-mexico-en-beijing

- México, G20 e inclusión social. Reforma, 27.06.19.

https://reforma.com/7JyDJThm2jmr

- México, China y una agenda económica de oportunidades. El Universal, 12.05.19.

https://www.eluniversal.com.mx/articulo/julian-ventura/nacion/mexico-china-y-una-agenda-economica-de-oportunidades

- México y Alemania, renovando su alianza para el futuro. El Universal, 03.05.19.

https://www.eluniversal.com.mx/columna/julian-ventura/nacion/mexico-y-alemania-renovando-su-alianza-para-el-futuro

- La promoción económica: al centro de la política exterior. El Financiero, 21.03.19.

https://www.elfinanciero.com.mx/opinion/colaborador-invitado/la-promocion-economica-al-centro-de-la-politica-exterior/

- MIKTA: cooperación y desarrollo. Reforma, 08.02.19.

https://reforma.com/MrkukjdoqGfr

- 45 años de Relaciones Diplomáticas entre México y China. China Hoy, 24.03.17.

https://almomento.mx/45-anos-relaciones-diplomaticas-mexico-china/

- México y la economía mundial del siglo XXI. Excelsior, 16.05.16

https://www.excelsior.com.mx/opinion/mexico-global/2016/05/16/1092843

- México: Plataforma de acercamiento entre China y América Latina y el Caribe, El Financiero, 14.10.15.

https://www.elfinanciero.com.mx/opinion/julian-ventura/mexico-plataforma-de-acercamiento-entre-china-y-america-latina-y-el-caribe/

- China, destino estratégico para productos del campo mexicano. Milenio, 20.09.15.

https://www.milenio.com/opinion/julian-ventura/columna-julian-ventura/china-destino-estrategico-productos-campo-mexicano

- México y China de cara al futuro. Excelsior, 10.11.14. https://www.google.com/url?client=internal-element-cse&cx=012394942619524936727:aqmfejabqhs&q=https://www.excelsior.com.mx/opinion/mexico-global/2014/11/10/991531&sa=U&ved=2ahUKEwiC797o4eDwAhVTVc0KHRPIDDc4KBAWMAR6BAgNEAI&usg=AOvVaw115m4ZEHgfj7QzIe-y91AnReferences
