= Mariana Díaz =

Mariana Díaz may refer to:

- Mariana Díaz Oliva (born 1976), Argentine retired tennis player
- Mariana Diaz Ximenez (born 1983), East Timorese marathon runner
- Mariana Díaz (footballer) (born 1990), Mexican footballer

== See also ==
- Mariano Díaz (disambiguation)
