= Mariano Díaz (disambiguation) =

Mariano Díaz (born 1993) is a Dominican footballer.

Mariano Díaz may also refer to:

- Mariano Díaz (photographer) (born 1929), Venezuelan photographer
- Mariano Díaz (cyclist) (born 1939), Spanish cyclist

== See also ==
- Mariano Dias (born 1960), Indian footballer
- Mariana Díaz (disambiguation)
