= Diego Gómez Pickering =

Mexican diplomat (born 1977)

Diego Gómez Pickering KCVO
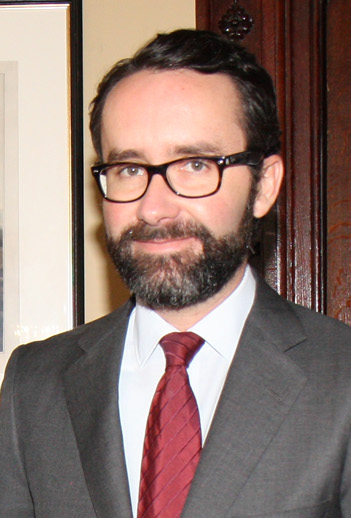

Consul-General of Mexico in New York City
- In office June 2016 – 30 November 2018
- President: Enrique Peña Nieto
- Preceded by: Sandra Fuentes-Berain Villenave
- Succeeded by: Jorge Islas López

Mexican Ambassador to the United Kingdom
- In office 4 December 2013 – June 2016
- President: Enrique Peña Nieto
- Preceded by: Eduardo Medina-Mora Icaza
- Succeeded by: Julián Ventura Valero

Personal details
- Born: 6 November 1977 (age 49) Mexico City, Mexico
- Education: Instituto Tecnológico Autónomo de México; Columbia University; Indian Institute of Mass Communication; Euclid University; Universitat Pompeu Fabra
- Occupation: Diplomat, journalist, writer
- Website: http://www.diegogomezpickering.com

Diego Gómez Pickering KCVO (born 1977) is a Mexican diplomat and writer, who served from December 2013 to June 2016 as Mexico's Ambassador to the United Kingdom. From June 2016 to November 2018 he served as the Consul-General of Mexico in New York City and Bermuda.

In 2007 he joined the Mexican Foreign Service where he served in the Mexican Ministry of Foreign Affairs as diplomatic attaché at the General Directorate for Africa and the Middle East. From 2007 to 2008 he was posted as political affairs, press and cultural attaché at the Mexican Embassy in Nairobi, Kenya.

On 13 May 2014, Gómez Pickering presented his credentials to Queen Elizabeth II at Buckingham Palace accrediting him as Mexico's representative to the United Kingdom.

In March 2015 he was part of the Mexican State visit of President Enrique Peña Nieto to the United Kingdom. He was appointed an Honorary Knight Commander of the Royal Victorian Order by the United Kingdom, awarded an Honorary Freedom by the City of London and appointed Knight Commander of the Order of Antonio José de Irisarri by Guatemala. He was named Diplomat of the Year 2015 by Diplomat Magazine.

== Bibliography ==
=== Novels ===
- La foto del recuerdo (2006)
- Juan sin nombre, la historia del negro conquistador (2026)

=== Collections ===
- Un mundo de historias (2017)

=== Essays and nonfiction ===
- Los jueves en Nairobi (2010)
- La primavera de Damasco (2013)
- Diario de Londres, apuntes de un embajador mexicano en Reino Unido (2019)
- Cartas de Nueva York, crónicas desde la tumba del imperio (2020)
- África, radiografía de un continente (2023)

=== Poetry ===
- P (2022)
- El estado que guardan las cosas (2026)
