= As Celtas =

- Founded: 9 May 2024; 2 years ago
- Ground: Instalaciones deportivas de A Madroa
- President: Marián Mouriño
- League: Segunda Federación
- 2025–26: Group I, 3rd of 14

As Celtas (literally "The Celtic Women" in Galician) is a Spanish women's football team. The team was founded in 2024 as part of RC Celta de Vigo, and plays in the Segunda Federación, the third tier of women's football in the country.

== History ==
In September 2023, Carlos Mouriño resigned as president of RC Celta de Vigo after 17 years in charge, leaving the club to his daughter Marián Mouriño. She became the first female president of the 100-year-old club, and announced on her official appointment in December that the club would have a women's team for the following season.

On 9 May 2024, the club was launched at an event including Celta's men's first team. Through a merger with nearby team UD Mos, the women's first team had a place in the Tercera Federación, the fourth tier of women's football in Spain. The new women's sector also launched with a reserve team and two youth teams.

In their debut season, 2024–25, As Celtas won promotion as runners-up to Deportivo Abanca B, their equivalents from Celta's main rival Deportivo de La Coruña. Promotion was confirmed on the final day with a 6–0 win at Villa de Simancas, concluding a campaign with 24 wins and 3 draws from 30 games, 110 goals scored and 17 conceded.
