= Fernando Gómez Mont =

Mexican politician

Fernando Francisco Gómez Mont Urueta

Secretary of the Interior
- In office November 10, 2008 – July 14, 2010
- President: Felipe Calderón
- Preceded by: Juan Camilo Mouriño
- Succeeded by: José Francisco Blake Mora

Personal details
- Born: January 11, 1963 (age 63) Mexico City, Mexico
- Party: Independent
- Education: Escuela Libre de Derecho
- Profession: Politician, Lawyer

Fernando Francisco Gómez Mont Urueta (born January 11, 1963) is a Mexican lawyer and politician who served as Secretary of the Interior. He was appointed by President Felipe Calderón on November 10, 2008, following the death of secretary Juan Camilo Mouriño in a plane crash on November 4. Gómez Mont was a member of the National Action Party until his resignation from the party on February 10, 2010. He presented his resignation on July 14, 2010, and President Calderon appointed Francisco Blake Mora to take charge of the Secretary of the Interior.

== Personal life and education ==
Gómez Mont is the son of Felipe Gómez Mont, one of the founders and main ideologists of the National Action Party. He was born in Mexico City in 1963 and became a member of the party during his adolescent years. His father had already died by this time.

Gómez Mont studied law at the Escuela Libre de Derecho. In 1999 he was a federal deputy in the LV Legislature where he presided over the Justice Commission of the Chamber of Deputies. He represented the National Action Party in the Federal Electoral Institute, a post he resigned to become a private lawyer.

Gómez Mont was an advisor to President Ernesto Zedillo along with Luis Téllez (former Secretary of Communications and Transportation in President Calderón's cabinet); he also worked with then Attorney General Antonio Lozano Gracia in the investigation of the 1994 assassination of presidential candidate Luis Donaldo Colosio.

In his private practice he carried President Carlos Salinas and Tomás Peñaloza Webb in a supposed fraud to the Mexican Social Security Institute, and represented Rogelio Montemayor in the Pemexgate investigation in 2006.

Political offices
Preceded by Juan Camilo Mouriño	Secretary of the Interior; 2008 - 2010	Succeeded by José Francisco Blake Mora
