= Marián Mouriño =

Spanish businesswoman (born 1975)

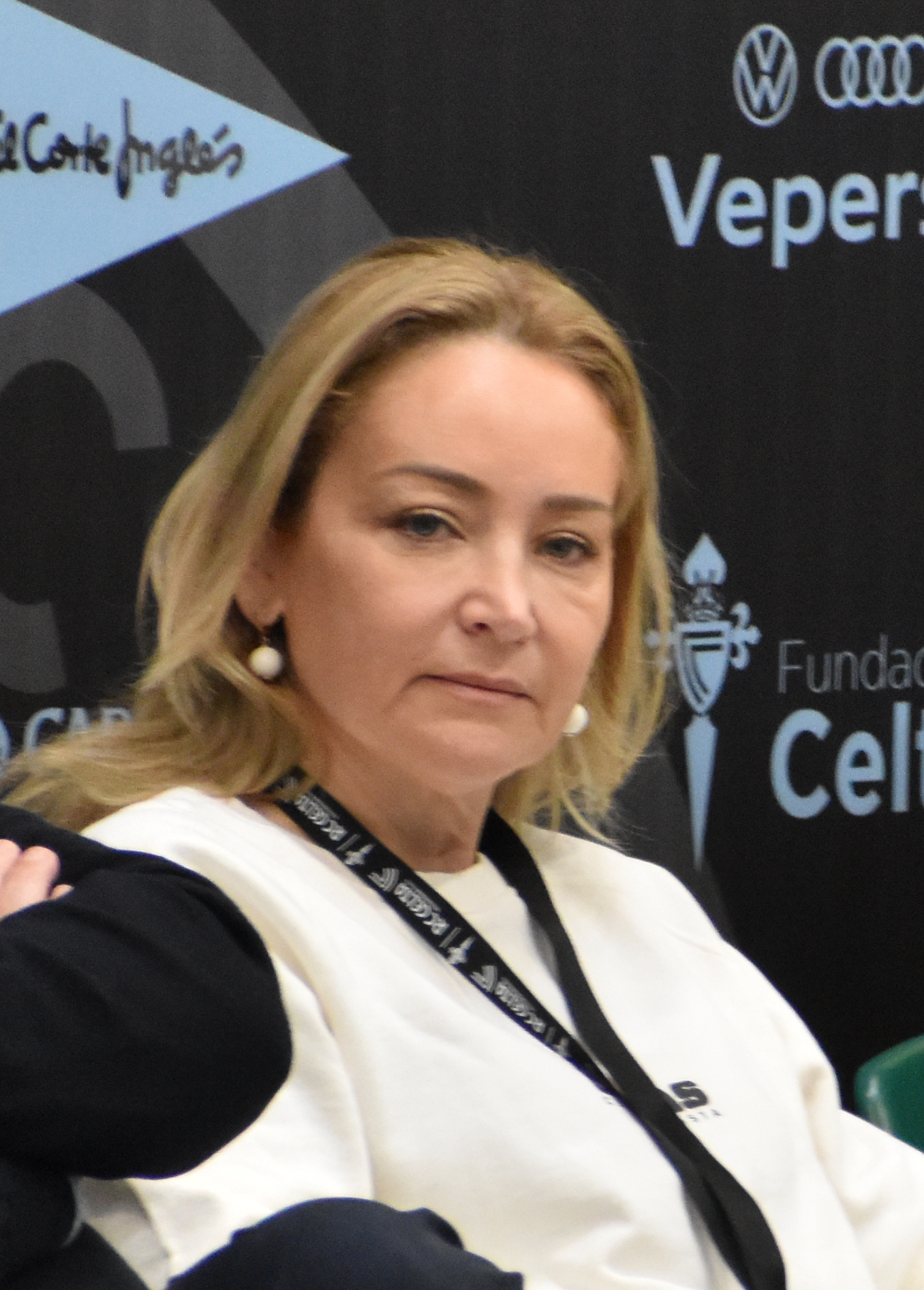
Mouriño in 2025

María de los Ángeles Mouriño Terrazo (born 25 May 1975) is a Spanish businesswoman. She became president of the football club Celta Vigo in 2023, the first woman in the position.

== Biography ==
Mouriño was born in Madrid and raised in Spain and Mexico. Her father Carlos Mouriño is a businessman from Galicia who was the longest-serving president of Celta Vigo; he was in office from 2006 to 2023. Her older brother Juan Camilo Mouriño (1971–2008) was Mexico's Secretary of the Interior, and died in an aeroplane disaster while in office. She graduated with a degree in business administration from the University of Miami and a master's degree in business management and marketing from IESIDE Business Institute in Vigo.

Mouriño spent most of her career working with her father's company Grupo Energético del Sureste (GES), including as its chief executive officer in Spain, and as Celta's marketing director from 2005 to 2009. In Mexico, she was a regional advisor to BBVA. She returned to Galicia in 2019, and took control of GES two years later.

On 28 September 2023, Carlos Mouriño resigned as president of Celta and his daughter succeeded him as the first woman president in the 100-year history of the club. The succession was approved on 13 December at a shareholders' meeting. She announced that for the following season, the club would have a women's football team. This team was launched as As Celtas in May 2024 by merging with nearby third-division club UD Mos. The club won promotion to the third-tier Segunda Federación in its first season. At the same time, the men's team finished seventh in the 2024–25 La Liga and returned to European football for the first time in nine years, a result that she said had a positive effect on the club's finances.
