= Secretariat of Public Security =

Former federal ministry of the Mexican Executive Cabinet

Mexico Secretariat of Public Security
- Secretaría de la Seguridad Pública
- Secretariat of Public Security logo

Agency overview
- Formed: 2000
- Dissolved: 2013
- Jurisdiction: Mexico
- Headquarters: Av. Constituyentes 947, Belén de Las Flores, Álvaro Obregón, 01110 Ciudad de México, Distrito Federal, Mexico Mexico City; 19°23′44.2536″N 99°13′17.619″W
- Employees: 21,600
- Annual budget: $126 million
- Agency executive: Manuel Mondragón y Kalb, Secretary
- Child agency: Federal Police (Mexico)
- Website: http://www.ssp.gob.mx

The Secretariat of Public Security, also known as the Ministry of Public Security (Spanish: Secretaría de Seguridad Pública, SSP), was the federal ministry of the Mexican Executive Cabinet that aimed to preserve freedom, order, and public peace and safeguard the integrity and rights of the people. The Assistant Attorney General uses the Powers of the Union to prevent the commission of crimes, develop public security policies of the Federal Executive, propose policies on crime, administer the federal prison system, and administer justice to juvenile offenders based on the Organic Law of the Federal Public Administration and other federal laws, regulations, decrees, agreements, and orders of the President of the Republic. It had its headquarters in Álvaro Obregón, Mexico City.

== History ==
Then-president-elect Enrique Peña Nieto announced on November 15, 2012, that he would eliminate the Secretariat of Public Security as part of his planned administrative reforms after taking office. It was dissolved on January 3, 2013, and replaced by the National Security Commission (Spanish: Comisión Nacional de Seguridad), an internal organ of the Secretariat of the Interior.

In 2018, the then-president Andrés Manuel López Obrador established the Secretariat of Security and Citizen Protection, to replace the National Security Commission.

== Functions ==
The Secretariat planned and conducted its activities according to the objectives, strategies, priorities, National Development Plans, and the National Program issued by the Head of the Federal Executive. According to Article 30a of the Organic Law of the Federal Civil Service, it had an office with the following main functions: developing security policies and proposing public policy on crime at the federal level, including rules, instruments, and actions to effectively prevent the commission of crimes, proposing Federal Executive measures to ensure consistent policies between the criminal divisions of the federal public service, chairing the National Council for Public Security at the Council of National Security, policies, actions, and strategies of coordination in the field of crime prevention and criminal justice policy for the entire national territory, dealing expeditiously with complaints and citizens' complaints regarding the exercise of its powers, organizing, managing, administering, and monitoring the PFP, and ensuring the honest performance of its staff and implementing its disciplinary system, safeguarding the integrity and heritage of the people, preventing the commission of federal crimes, and preserving freedom, order, and public peace, establishing a system to collect, analyze, examine, and process information for the prevention of crime, using methods that ensure strict adherence to human rights and running the penalties for federal crimes and administering the federal prison system, as well as organizing and conducting activities to support those that have been released.

== Organization ==
For the study, planning, and dispatching of matters within its competence, the Secretariat was composed of the following administrative units and bodies:

- I. Subsecretary Strategy and Police Intelligence;
- II. Subsecretary Prevention, Linkage and Human Rights;
- III. Subsecretary Federal Prison System;
- IV. Subsecretary Assessment and Institutional Development;
- V. Major Official;
- VI. General Coordination of Legal Affairs;
- VII. General Coordination of Mexico Shelf;
- VIII. General Directorate of Social Communication;
- IX. Directorate General for International Affairs;
- X. Directorate General for Coordination and Development of State and Municipal Police;
- XI. Directorate General of Private Security;
- XII. General Crime Prevention;
- XIII. DG Entailment and Civic Participation;
- XIV. Directorate General of Human Rights;
- XV. General Directorate of Standardization and Development Facility;
- XVI. General Directorate of Security Transfer of Offenders and Prison;
- XVII. Directorate General of Planning and Evaluation;
- XVIII. Directorate General of Transparency and Regulatory Improvement;
- XIX. General Directorate of Professional Police Career and Regulations;
- XX. Directorate General of Planning and Budget Organization;
- XXI. Directorate General of Human Resources;
- XXII. Department of Material Resources and General Services;
- XXIII. Directorate General of Public Works and Services;
- XXIV. Directorate General of Administrative Systems and
- XXV. Decentralized administrative bodies:
  - a) Federal Police;
  - b) Executive Secretary of the National System of Public Security;
  - c) Prevention and Social Rehabilitation and
  - d) Council of Children.

== List of secretaries ==
- President Vicente Fox
  - (2000 - 2004) : Alejandro Gertz Manero
  - (2004 - 2005) : Ramón Martín Huerta
  - (2005 - 2006) : Eduardo Medina-Mora Icaza
- President Felipe Calderón
  - (2006 - 2012): Genaro García Luna
- President Enrique Peña Nieto
  - (2012 - 2013): Manuel Mondragón y Kalb
