= Elene Viles =

Spanish footballer (born 2001)

Personal information
- Full name: Elene Viles Odriozola
- Date of birth: 2 July 2001 (age 25)
- Place of birth: Azpeitia, Spain
- Position: Midfielder

Team information
- Current team: Deportivo Alavés
- Number: 18

Youth career
- 2015–2017: Lagun Onak

Senior career*
Years	Team	Apps	(Gls)
2017–2018	Lagun Onak		
2018–2019	Real Sociedad B		
2019–2025	Real Sociedad	21	(0)
2025–	Deportivo Alavés	29	(3)
- * Club domestic league appearances and goals as of 2 May 2026

Elene Viles Odriozola (born 2 July 2001) is a Spanish footballer who plays as a midfielder for Deportivo Alavés.

== Club career ==
Viles started her career at Lagun Onak.
