= Manuel Eduardo de Gorostiza =

19th century Mexican writer, dramatist and diplomat (1789–1851)

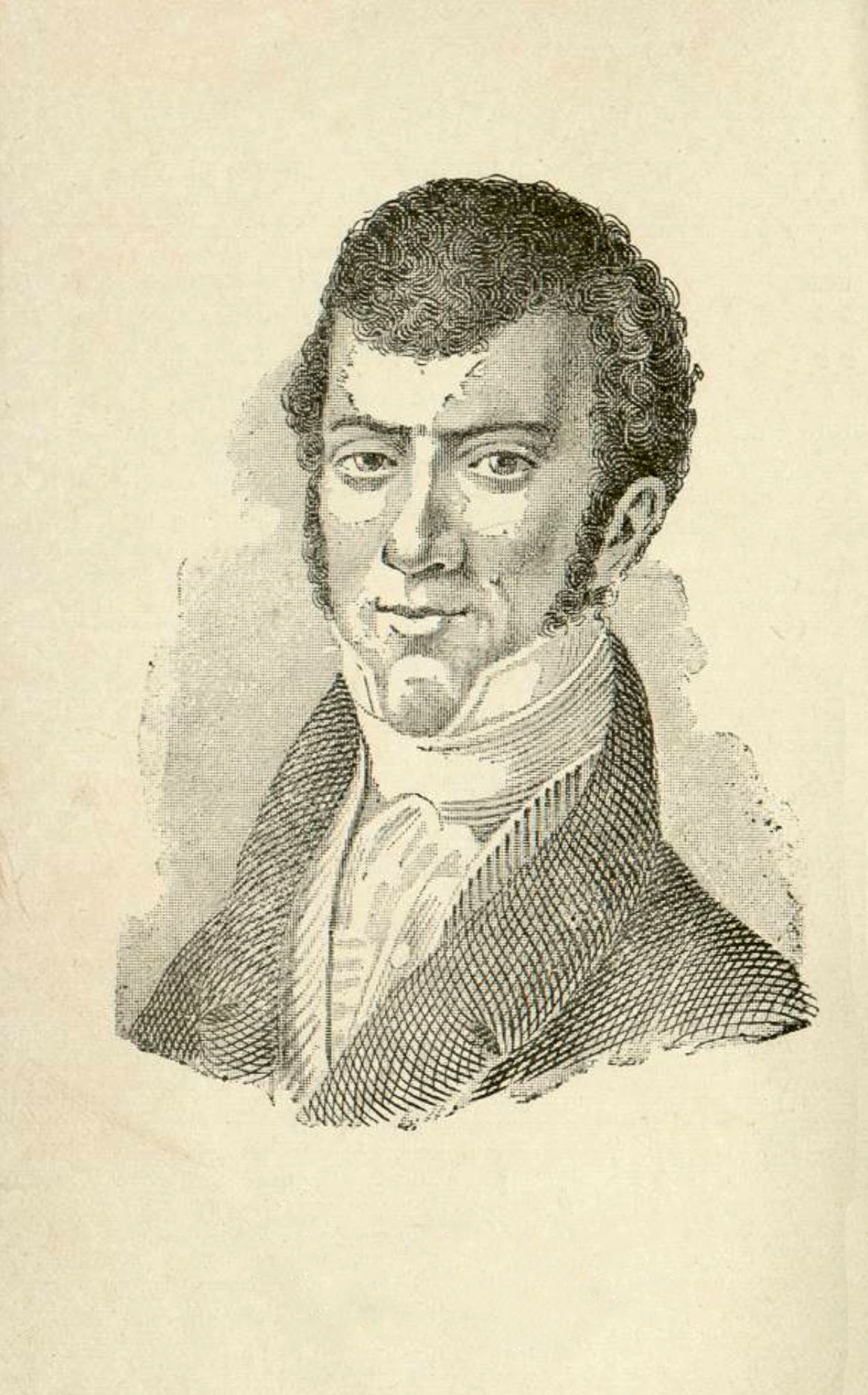
Manuel Eduardo de Gorostiza

Manuel María del Pilar Eduardo de Gorostiza y Cepeda (13 October 1789 – 23 October 1851) was a Mexican writer, dramatist and diplomat. He was the son of Pedro Fernández de Gorostiza, governor of the port of Veracruz, and the poet Rosario Cepeda. Gorostiza was in 1824 the first Mexican ambassador to the United Kingdom of the Netherlands. Later he was ambassador in London. Gorostiza was the Mexican envoy to the United States in 1836 with the mission to halt the support of Washington to Texas. As Mexican Minister of Foreign Affairs in 1838 and 1839 he had to deal with the Republic of Texas.
