= Carlos Mouriño =

Spanish-Mexican businessman

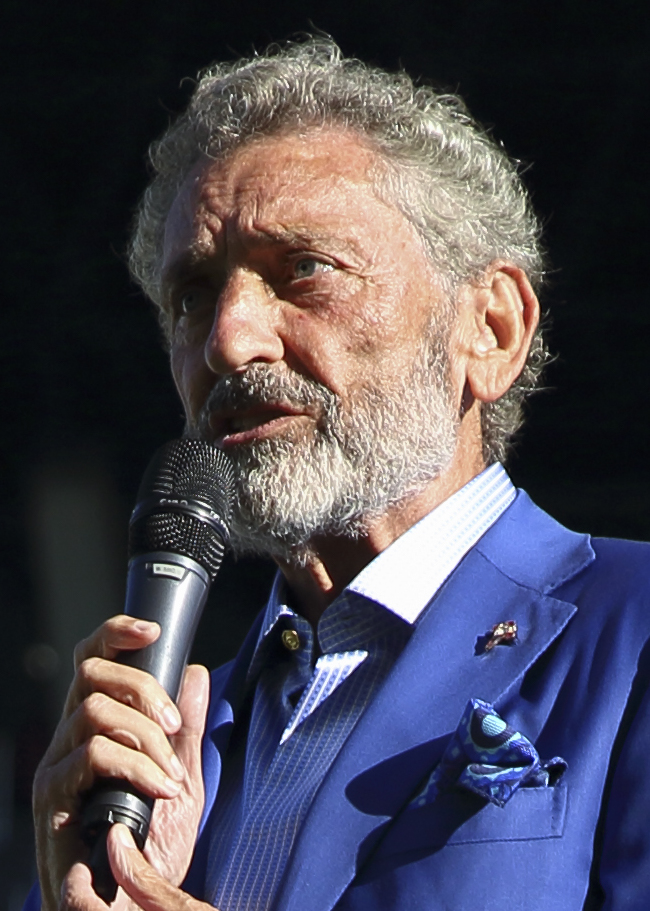
Mouriño in 2018

Manuel Carlos Mouriño Atanes (born 4 March 1943) is a Spanish businessman. He was the president of the football club Celta Vigo from 2006 to 2023.

After starting his career in his native Vigo and in Madrid, he emigrated to Mexico City in 1978 to operate his father-in-law's businesses. In 1985, he purchased a chain of petrol stations in Campeche, which expanded into other states. His assets diversified into construction and fast food franchising in the 1990s and 2000s. Politically, he endorsed the National Action Party (PAN), of which his son Juan Camilo (1971–2008) was a member.

Mouriño returned to Galicia in 2000, becoming a board member at Celta in 2003 and president in 2006. After being relegated and going through a financial crisis, the team won promotion back to La Liga in 2012 and he became their longest-serving president in 2017. He resigned in late 2023 and was succeeded by his daughter Marián Mouriño.

== Biography ==
=== Early life and career ===
Born in Vigo in Galicia, Mouriño was educated by the Salesians. He worked for a local travel agency and as a car accessory salesperson before moving to Madrid, becoming head of administration at the Riomiño metalworks and director general of Nautrónica, an American transport and arms company.

=== Career in Mexico ===
Following Nautrónica's financial crisis, Mouriño emigrated to Mexico in 1978 to manage his father-in-law's assets in Mexico City, including hotels, furniture shops and bakeries. In the same year, he founded Ivancar, a car mat manufacturer; Iztapalapa, a paper recycler, followed in 1984. After two armed attacks on his hotels, and wishing to spend more time with his family, he bought a chain of five petrol stations in Campeche in 1985, buying the shares from his two business partners three years later.

In the late 1980s and early 1990s, Mouriño's business interests diversified into housing, as state governor Abelardo Carrillo Zavala ordered new constructions. Mouriño lost one million Mexican pesos in the early 1990s after investing in Banco Unión. In 1997, he registered Grupo Energético del Sureste (GES), operating petrol stations in other southeastern states and since 2003 holding franchises for fast food such as Church's Chicken and Burger King.

Politically, Mouriño had strong relationships with Institutional Revolutionary Party (PRI) politicians such as Carrillo Zavala, but endorsed the National Action Party (PAN) in 1992. He campaigned for Vicente Fox in the 2000 Mexican general election. He stopped political activity after the rise of his son Juan Camilo Mouriño (1971–2008) in the PAN.

=== President of Celta ===
Mouriño returned to Galicia in 2000. He became a member of the board at Celta Vigo in December 2003 and became president in May 2006 after buying the majority of shares possessed by predecessor Horacio Gómez. One of his earliest actions was replacing manager Fernando Vázquez with former Barcelona player Hristo Stoichkov, who had never been a head coach before; the team were relegated in 2006–07 and Stoichkov was dismissed early into the next campaign.

In 2009, Celta narrowly avoided relegation to Segunda División B and entered bankruptcy proceedings over a €69 million debt. Mouriño reduced the debt by 85% and negotiated with the treasury, allowing for the bill to be reduced to €20 million to be paid by 2020. During the club's financial crisis, he received offers from investors who wished to relocate it to another city. In 2011–12, the team achieved promotion back to La Liga as runners-up. Mouriño surpassed Gómez's record in March 2017 as the longest-serving president of Celta.

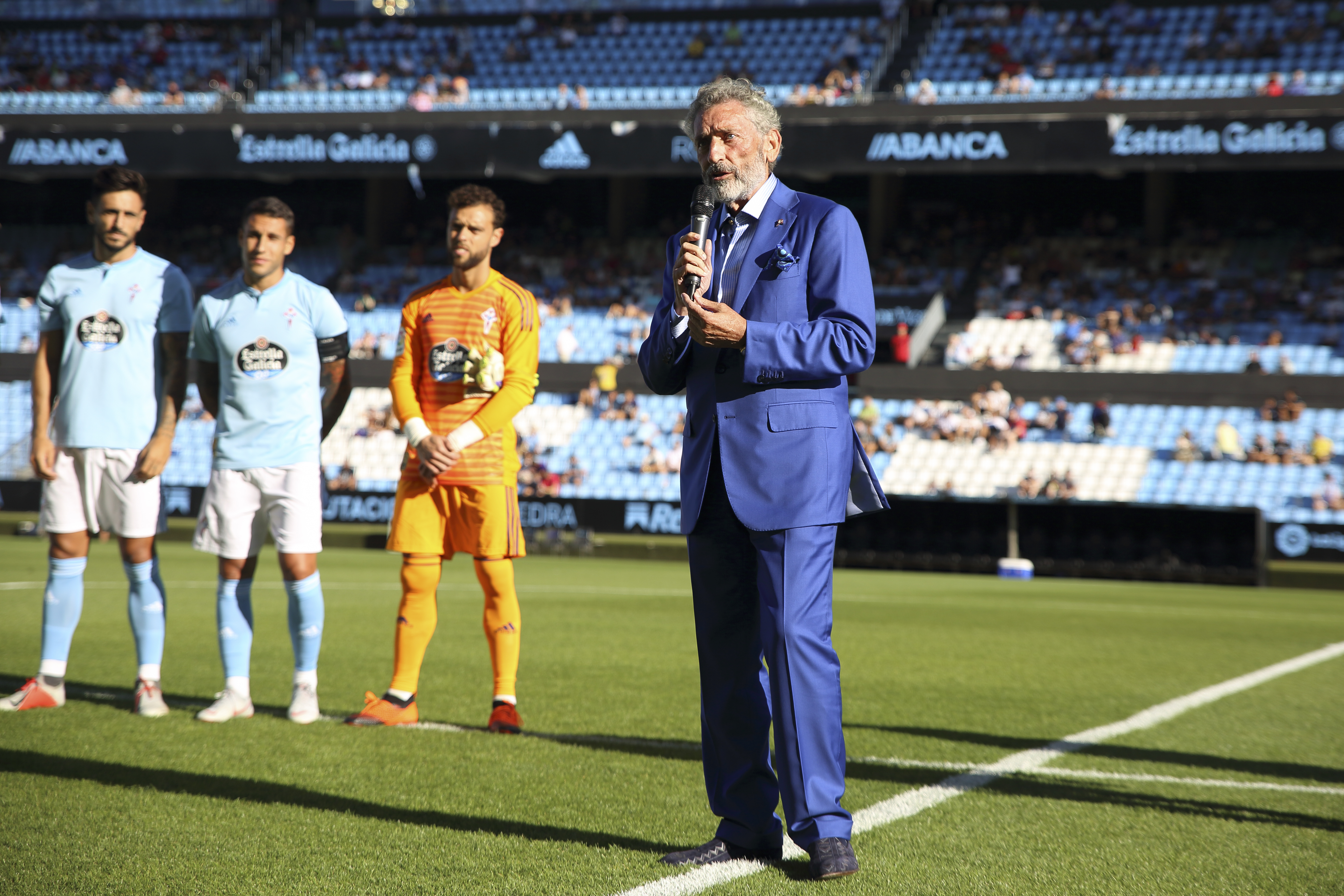
Mouriño at a pre-season friendly in August 2018

Mouriño clashed with Abel Caballero, the mayor of Vigo from the Spanish Socialist Workers' Party (PSOE). Caballero's administration refused to sell or lease the Balaídos stadium to the club and also refused planning permission for Mouriño's plan to build a training and commercial centre in nearby Mos. In 2018, the club issued an instruction for no director to interact with Caballero during matches. Mouriño threatened to relocate the club during his feud with the mayor. Mouriño was criticised by fans in 2019 for politicising the club by hosting events for the People's Party inside the headquarters.

In 2019, Mouriño's club signed Santi Mina, a player who they had previously sold to Valencia. Mina was convicted of sexual abuse in 2022. The following year, he said of the player: "Santi Mina has had a problem, but he doesn't stop being an academy player, apart from [the crime], which is 100% condemnable, we don't have any problem with him". He was criticised for this statement by the president of the club's federation of fans, and by local feminist groups. Mouriño said that he regretted not inserting a clause in Mina's contract allowing Celta to fire him if found guilty, an application that would be legal in Spain.

Mouriño had a public dispute with player Denis Suárez in the summer of 2022 as the midfielder allegedly turned down four offers to play elsewhere for more money, as Celta looked to sell him due to his high wages. Mouriño had wanted to sell Suárez for over a year beforehand, due to disputes with the player's agent.

In November 2022, approaching his 80th birthday, Mouriño declared that he would remain in the presidency until at least the club's centenary in August. In September 2023, he resigned and his daughter Marián Mouriño succeeded him as Celta's first female president.
