= Juan Camilo Mouriño =

Mexican politician

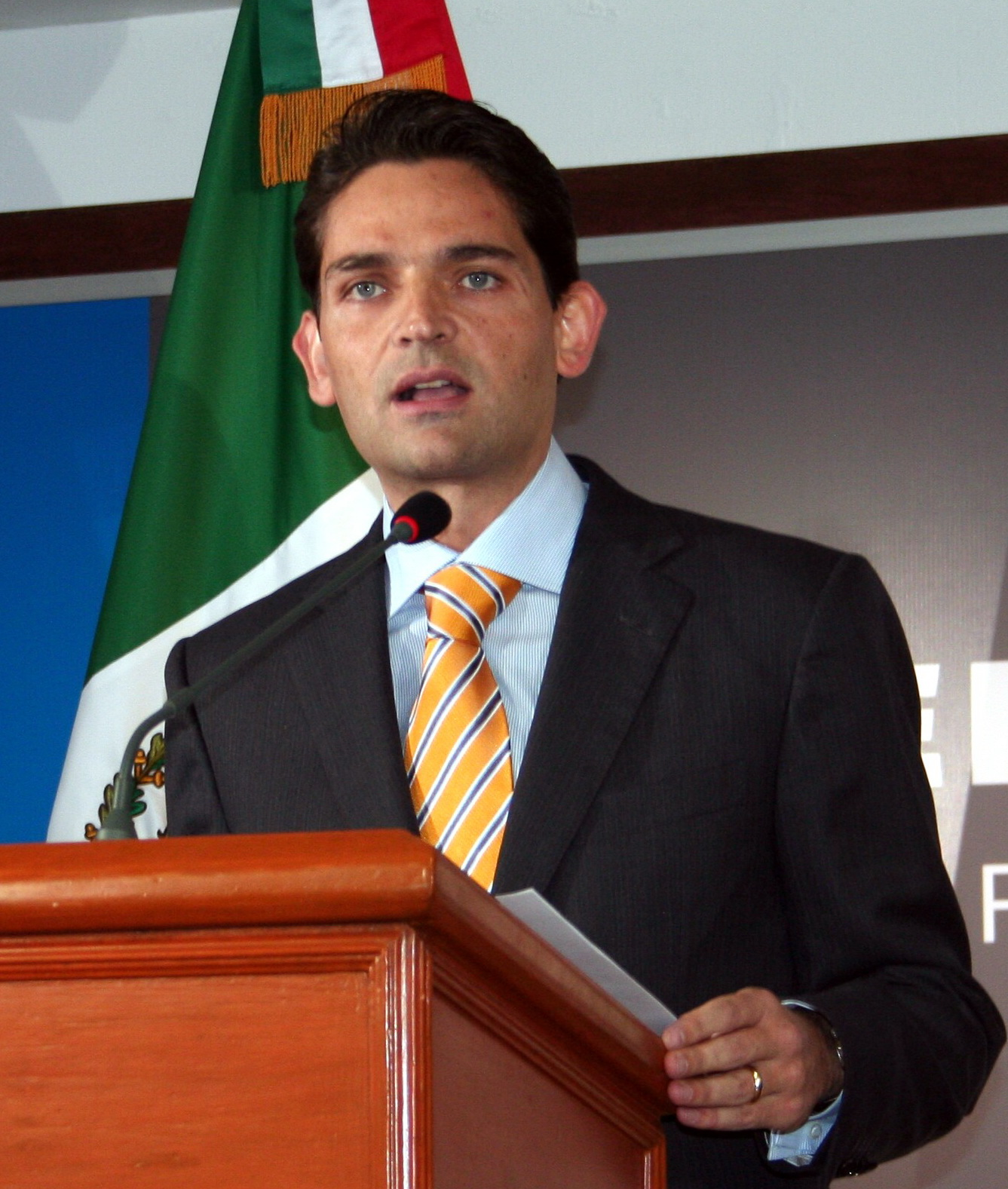
- Mouriño in March 2008

Secretary of the Interior of Mexico
- In office 16 January 2008 – 4 November 2008
- President: Felipe Calderón
- Preceded by: Francisco Ramírez Acuña
- Succeeded by: Fernando Gómez-Mont

Personal details
- Born: Juan Camilo Mouriño Terrazo; 1 August 1971 Madrid, Spain
- Died: 4 November 2008 (aged 37) Mexico City, Mexico
- Cause of death: Plane crash
- Party: National Action Party
- Spouse: Mari Gely Escalante Castillo
- Relations: Carlos Mouriño (father); Marián Mouriño (sister)
- Children: 3
- Education: University of Tampa
- Profession: Economist

Juan Camilo Mouriño Terrazo (1 August 1971 – 4 November 2008) was a Spanish-born Mexican politician affiliated with the National Action Party (PAN) and the Secretary of the Interior in the cabinet of President Felipe Calderón.

== Personal life and education ==
Mouriño was born in Madrid to Carlos Mouriño, a Spanish immigrant to Mexico. His father was president of Spanish football club RC Celta de Vigo from 2006 to 2023, when he was succeeded by daughter Marián Mouriño. Mouriño Terrazo studied economics at the University of Tampa and at the Universidad Autónoma de Campeche.

== Political career ==
Mouriño served as local deputy in the State Congress of Campeche and as a federal deputy during the LVIII Legislature (2000–2003) of the Congress of the Union. In 2003 he unsuccessfully ran for municipal president (mayor) of Campeche.

His political career had been linked to Felipe Calderón: when Calderón served as Secretary of Energy Mouriño was designated under-secretary of Energy; during Calderón's presidential campaign he was the coordinator of the campaign first and then under-coordinator when Josefina Vázquez Mota became general-coordinator. In September 2006 he was designated head of Calderón's transition team and then on 1 December 2006, President Calderón appointed him as the Chief of the Presidency's Office.

On 15 January 2008, Mouriño was designated Secretary of the Interior.

== Scandals ==
Juan Camilo Mouriño came under public scrutiny due to some contracts that appear to be signed by him as a representative of the companies owned by his father, while he was local deputy in Campeche, and later as an undersecretary of energy (under then energy secretary Calderón), both government-related positions.

Andrés Manuel López Obrador showed also two new contracts to demonstrate that Mouriño could have engaged in abuse of power, since it seemed he was still shareholder of the companies that benefited from those contracts.

== Death ==
Mouriño was in a SEGOB-owned Learjet 45 that crashed into rush-hour Mexico City traffic on 4 November 2008, killing all nine people on board. The crash occurred in one of the most up-scale districts of Mexico City, and only 1 kilometre from the Presidential Residence, Los Pinos.

Secretary Mouriño had spent the day at an official function in the state of San Luis Potosí and left the state capital's international airport at 17:00 local time. There is a confirmed number of 14 fatalities: five passengers (including him), three crew (pilot, co-pilot and one stewardess), and seven people at ground zero, plus about 40 injured, as a result of the incident. Also among those who died was Mexican politician and lawyer José Luis Santiago Vasconcelos, who was travelling with Mouriño.

=== Investigation ===
The two black boxes police found from the accident were sent to the United States to determine the cause(s) of the plane crash. In November 2009, the Mexican government announced that the main cause of the crash was turbulence encountered because of the pilot's failure to slow down in time and approaching too close to the wake turbulence of a 767.

Political offices
| Preceded by Francisco Ramírez Acuña | Secretary of the Interior; 2008 | Succeeded by Fernando Gómez-Mont |
