= Ramón Martín Huerta =

Mexican politician

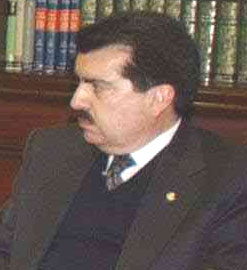

Governor of Guanajuato
- In office 9 August 1999 – 25 September 2000
- Preceded by: Vicente Fox
- Succeeded by: Juan Carlos Romero Hicks

2nd Secretary of Public Security
- In office 7 June 2004 – 21 September 2005
- President: Vicente Fox
- Preceded by: Alejandro Gertz Manero
- Succeeded by: Eduardo Medina Mora

Deputy of the Congress of the Union for the 2nd Circumscription
- In office 1 September 1988 – 31 August 1991

Personal details
- Born: 24 January 1957 San Juan de los Lagos, Jalisco, Mexico
- Died: 21 September 2005 (aged 48)
- Party: National Action Party
- Spouse: María Esther Montes (m. 1989)

Ramón Martín Huerta (24 January 1957 – 21 September 2005) was a Mexican politician affiliated with the National Action Party (PAN). He served in Vicente Fox's cabinet as Public Security Secretary.

== Personal life ==
Ramón Martín Huerta was born in San Juan de los Lagos, Jalisco on 24 January 1957. He studied business administration in the Universidad del Bajío. He was married to María Esther Montes Hernández with whom he had 3 children: Héctor Ramón, César Alejandro and Denisse.

== Political career ==
During the 1980s he joined the PAN and became an active member. He was Director of Guanajuato's Industrials Association; there he met Vicente Fox and introduced him into politics.

From 1988 to 1991 he served in the lower house of the Mexican Congress. He was assigned personal secretary of former Governor Carlos Medina Plascencia. When Vicente Fox was elected Governor of Guanajuato he became a cabinet member and later, when Fox resigned in 1999 to run for the presidency, he was appointed substitute governor.

A trusted Fox ally and friend, Martín Huerta worked as the Secretary of the Interior from 2000 to 2004. In 2004 President Fox assigned Martín Huerta as Public Safety Secretary, replacing former incumbent Alejandro Gertz Manero.

== Helicopter crash ==
Ramón Martín Huerta, his deputy and seven others crashed in cloud-shrouded mountains outside Mexico City on Wednesday 21 September 2005 killing everyone on board. The craft, a Bell 412 helicopter, crashed into a wooded mountaintop about 11,200 feet (3700 m) high at a spot about 20 miles (30 km) outside Mexico City.

It has been speculated that the crash was caused by organized crime. However, authorities have always stated it was an accident.

Political offices
Preceded by Alejandro Gertz Manero	Secretary of Public Safety; 2004–2005	Succeeded by Eduardo Medina-Mora Icaza
Preceded by Vicente Fox Quesada	Governor of Guanajuato; 1999–2000	Succeeded by Juan Carlos Romero Hicks
