= Sanadri =

Spanish footballer (born 2000)

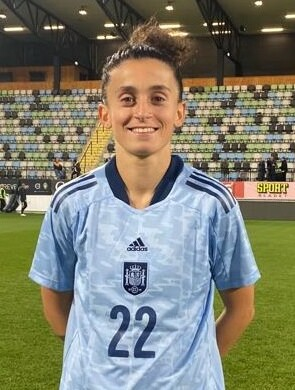

Personal information
- Full name: Marta San Adrián Rocandio
- Date of birth: 22 February 2000 (age 26)
- Place of birth: San Sebastián, Spain
- Position: Forward

Team information
- Current team: Alavés
- Number: 23

Youth career
- 2013–2014: Añorga

Senior career*
Years	Team	Apps	(Gls)
2014–2017	Añorga B		
2017–2018	Añorga		
2018–2023	Alavés	93+	(28+)
2023–2026	Athletic Club	30	(2)
2025	→ Alavés (loan)	10	(6)

International career^{‡}
2021–2022	Spain U23	2	(1)
2022–	Basque Country	1	(0)
- * Club domestic league appearances and goals as of 25 July 2025 ‡ National team caps and goals as of 21:20, 16 December 2023 (UTC)

Marta San Adrián Rocandio (born 22 February 2000), often known as Sanadri, is a Spanish professional footballer who plays as a forward for Athletic Club. She previously played for Alavés.

== Club career ==
Sanadri started her career in Añorga's academy. She joined Alavés in 2018.

In 2023 she moved to Athletic Club on a three-year contract.

After making only nine appearances from the bench in the first half of the 2024–25 Liga F season, withou scoring, she was loaned back to second-tier Alavés for the remainder of the campaign, along with teammate Nerea Bengoa.

== international career ==
She has been selected for the Spain under-23 squad, and for the unofficial Basque Country women's national football team (which plays only occasionally), making her first appearance in December 2022 against Chile.
