= Mariana Díaz (footballer) =

Mexican footballer (born 1990)

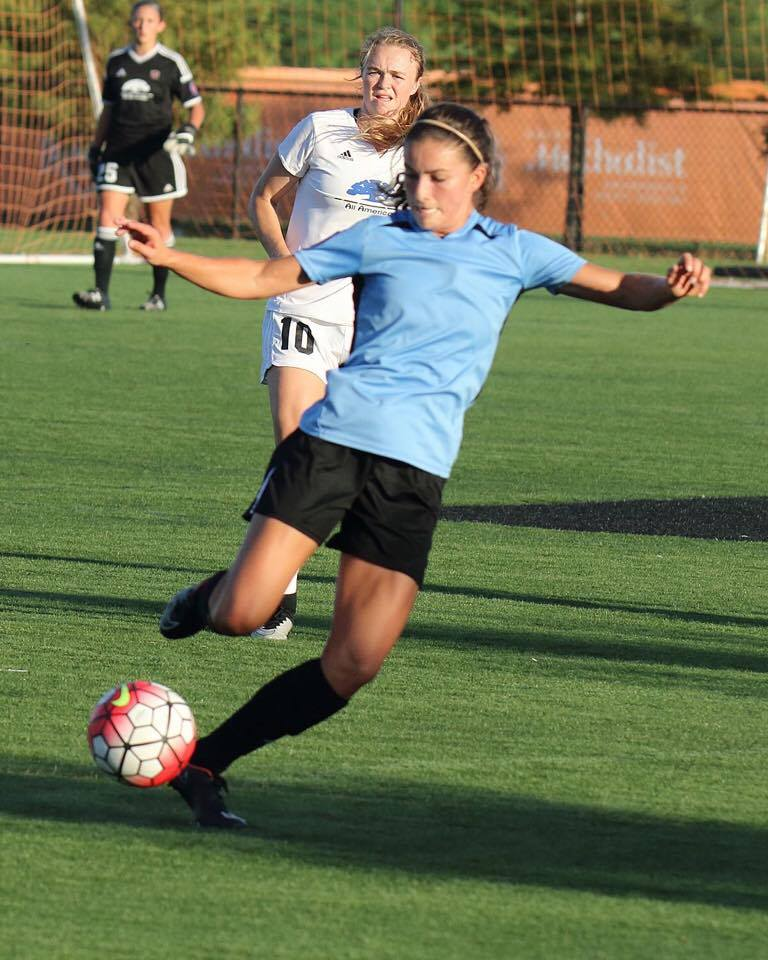

Personal information
- Full name: Mariana Díaz Leal Arrillaga
- Date of birth: 29 May 1990 (age 36)
- Place of birth: Querétaro City, Mexico
- Height: 1.70 m (5 ft 7 in)
- Position: Striker

Team information
- Current team: Sport Extremadura

Senior career*
Years	Team	Apps	(Gls)
2015–2016	Houston Aces	10	(2)
2016–2017	San Zaccaria	13	(1)
2017	Houston Aces	7	(1)
2017–2018	Santa Teresa	18	(3)
2018	Houston Aces		
2018–2021	Santa Teresa	13	(0)
2021	Valadares Gaia	0	(0)
2022	Querétaro	18	(2)
2023–	Sport Extremadura	0	(0)

International career
- Mexico
- * Club domestic league appearances and goals as of 15 October 2017

Mariana Díaz Leal Arrillaga (born 29 May 1990) is a Mexican footballer who plays as a striker.

== Club career ==
She previously played in the United Women's Soccer and the Italian Serie A for Houston Aces and San Zaccaria, respectively.

== International career ==
Mexico called up Díaz Leal for training sessions in October 2015.
