= Organic Law of the Federal Public Administration =

The Organic Law of the Federal Public Administration (Spanish: Ley Orgánica de la Administración Pública Federal) was a decree of the Congress of Mexico that provides the basis for the organization of the federal government of Mexico, both centralized and parastatal. It was published in the Official Gazette on 29 December 1976.

The Office of the President, the Secretaries of State, the Administrative Departments and the Legal Counsel of the Federal Executive, comprise the central public administration. The decentralized bodies, state owned enterprises, national institutions of credit, national credit auxiliary organizations, national institutions and surety insurance and trusts, make up the government parastatal.

== See also ==
- Organic Law of the Attorney General's Office (Ley Orgánica de la Procuraduría General de la República)
