= Josefa González-Blanco Ortiz-Mena =

Mexican ecologist and politician

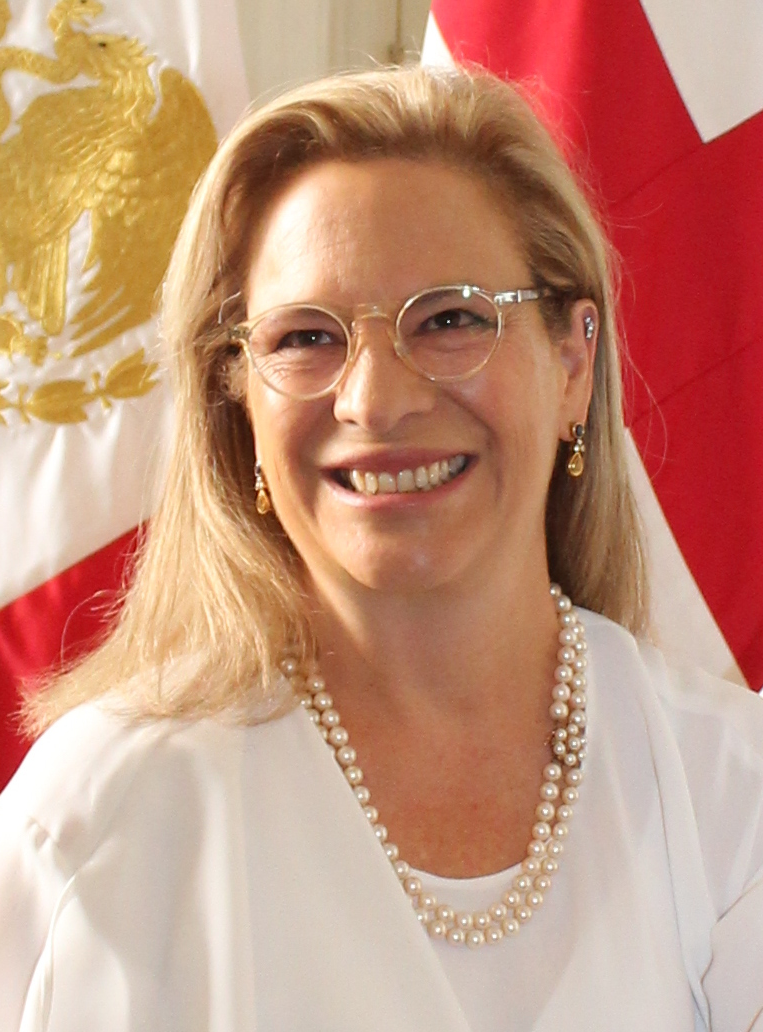
Josefa González-Blanco Ortiz-Mena in 2021.

Josefa González Blanco Ortiz Mena (born 9 March 1965) is a Mexican ecologist, politician and diplomat from the National Regeneration Movement who was the Secretary of Environment from 2018 to 2019. She served as the Mexican ambassador to the United Kingdom from 23 April 2021 to 26 January 2026. On 9 June 2021, she presented her credentials to Queen Elizabeth II at Buckingham Palace accrediting her as Mexico's representative to the United Kingdom.

== Early life and education ==
Josefa González Blanco was born in Mexico City in 1965 to Patrocinio González Garrido and Patricia Ortiz Mena Salinas. She attended Anáhuac University where she studied Law and graduated with a degree in law in 1989. In 2014, she graduated from the John F. Kennedy University with a Master's in Transformative Art.

== Career ==
She was secretary of environment and natural resources in the federal government between 2018 and 2019, leading the national policy on natural resources and environmental regulation. She was administrative secretary of the Postgraduate Program of the Faculty of Law of the National Autonomous University of Mexico and promoter of various social, cultural and environmental programs and projects.

=== Secretary of Environment and Natural Resources ===
From 2017 to 2018, she was coordinator of the strategic agenda of Morena. In 2018, she assumed the title of the Secretariat as the first secretary of the environment and natural resources of the López Obrador administration, becoming the second woman to hold the position in the history of the federal agency. On 25 May 2019, she resigned from her office as environment secretary after causing delay to a commercial flight she was meant to board.

=== Ambassador to the United Kingdom ===
In March 2021, she was appointed ambassador to the United Kingdom by the Senate of the Republic. On 23 April 2021, she officially assumed her duties as representative of Mexico in London, after presenting a copy of her credentials to the ministry of foreign affairs.
