= Juan Francisco Urquidi =

Mexican politician and diplomat (1881–1938)

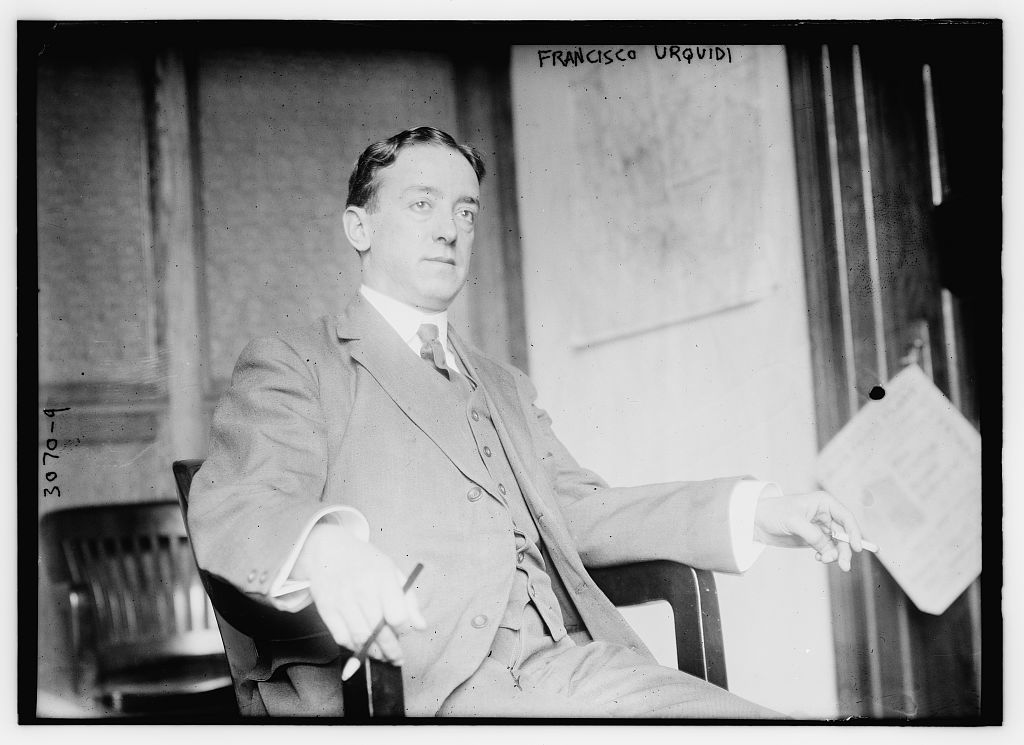

Envoy extraordinary and minister plenipotentiary of Mexico to Colombia
- In office 8 October 1923 – 21 November 1927
- Preceded by: José Maximiliano Alfonso de Rosenzweig Díaz
- Succeeded by: Julio Madero González

Envoy extraordinary and minister plenipotentiary of Mexico to El Salvador
- In office 5 June 1928 – 16 March 1930
- Preceded by: Julio Madero González
- Succeeded by: Francisco de Asís de Icaza y León (interim)

Personal details
- Born: Juan Francisco Urquidi Márquez; 16 July 1881 Mexico City
- Died: 14 December 1938 (aged 57) Mexico City
- Spouse: Beatrice Mary (m. 1917)
- Children: Víctor L. Urquidi Magda Urquidi de Acosta, María Catalina Urquidi Bingham
- Education: Massachusetts Institute of Technology

Juan Francisco Urquidi Márquez (16 July 1881 – 14 December 1938) was a Mexican politician and diplomat who served as envoy extraordinary and minister plenipotentiary of Mexico to Colombia from 8 October 1923 to 21 November 1927, and as envoy extraordinary and minister plenipotentiary of Mexico to El Salvador from 5 June 1928 to 16 March 1930. From 15 May to 29 October 1914, he also served as confidential agent of President Venustiano Carranza in the United States.

== Biography ==
Urquidi was born on 16 July 1881 in Mexico City into a wealthy family with ancestry in Chihuahua. His father was Francisco de Paula Urquidi Cárdeña (1821–1881) and his mother Catalina Márquez Barraza (1835–1896). He completed high school at Dean Academy in Franklin, Massachusetts, and eventually graduated from the Massachusetts Institute of Technology with a bachelor's degree in civil engineering.

He married Australian-born nurse Mary Bingham in 1917 He died on 14 December 1938 in Mexico City.
