= RB Leipzig affiliated teams =

Leipzig reserve, women's, junior, and academy teams

Association football club RB Leipzig-affiliated teams include a reserve team, women's team, and junior and academy teams.

== Reserve team ==
=== History ===
The first reserve team was formed out of the second team of SSV Markranstädt. Its inaugural season was 2009–10 in the Bezirksliga Leipzig. The team finished in first place and won promotion to the 2010–11 Sachsenliga. As part of the deal with SSV Markranstädt, the team returned to SSV Markranstädt after the 2009–10 season, and played the 2010–11 Sachsenliga as their new first team.

In order to replace the reserve team and to avoid having to begin with its reserve team from the bottom of the German football league system, RB Leipzig partnered with ESV Delitzsch from Delitzsch in northwest Saxony. RB Leipzig adopted the first team of ESV Delitzsch as its new reserve team and purchased its playing right for Bezirksliga Leipzig. The team again finished first place and won promotion to the 2011–12 Sachsenliga, to face the first team of SSV Markranstädt.

With the impending bankruptcy of FC Sachsen Leipzig, which folded in June 2011, RB Leipzig considered purchasing its playing right for the Oberliga for its reserve team, but later withdrew their offer. A condition for the acquisition was that at least 51 percent of the players in the team had to be integrated in the new club, but RB Leipzig instead chose to develop its own reserve team.

Tino Vogel was appointed head coach for the 2011–12 season. The team was joined by senior defender Ingo Hertzsch, who had left the professional team. The reserve team came fourth in the Sachsenliga. The league was won by SSV Markranstädt, who recaptured a playing right for the Oberliga. The team finished the 2012–13 Sachsenliga season in third place. The team came first in 2013–14 Sachsenliga, and won promotion to NOFV-Oberliga Süd. Forward Tom Nattermann scored 32 goals during the season, finishing the 2013–14 Sachsenliga as the league's top goal scorer by a wide margin.

The 2014–15 season included opponents such as SSV Markranstädt and 1. FC Lokomotive Leipzig, but the reserve team successfully adapted to the Oberliga and came to dominate. The team finished the 2014–15 NOFV-Oberliga Süd in first place, and won promotion to the Regionalliga Nordost. Nattermann scored 26 goals, beaten only by Jan Nezmar from FC Oberlausitz Neugersdorf.

Before the 2015–16 season, almost half of the players from the previous season left the team, including Nattermann, who left for FC Erzgebirge Aue. The new players almost all came from the club's own ranks, including six players from the A-junior team. The reserve team finished its first season in the Regionalliga in 11th place.

Incumbent B-junior coach Robert Klauß was appointed head coach for the 2016–17 season, replacing Vogel. Vogel continued his career at the club as a scout in central Germany, while his former assistant coach Olaf Holetschek continued as a scout in junior football. The team was reinforced by more players from the A-junior team, as well as 19-year-old talent Dominik Martinović from the Bayern Munich A-junior team. The reserve team was the youngest in the Regionalliga before the 2016–17 season. The average age stood at 19 years and 5 months in June 2016.

RB Leipzig disbanded the U23 team after the 2016–17 season, while keeping the U19 and U17 squads.

=== Stadium ===
The reserve team's home matches were at Stadion am Bad in Markranstädt. The stadium is the traditional home ground of SSV Markanstädt. In 2013, RB Leipzig made plans to build its own amateur stadium. The first plans envisioned a 5,000-seat stadium at the RB Leipzig training center at Cottaweg. However, the limited space at Cottaweg and complicated approval procedures, scuppered the plan. The club instead a spot near the Sportschule Egidius Braun of the Saxony Football Association (SFV) at Abtaundorf.

=== Past seasons ===
Season	League	Place	W	D	L	GF	GA	Pts
2009–10	Bezirksliga Leipzig (VII)	1	23	5	2	109	27	74
2010–11	Bezirksliga Leipzig	1	18	6	6	65	32	60
2011–12	Sachsenliga (VI)	4	15	8	7	62	34	53
2012–13	Sachsenliga	3	21	4	5	69	25	67
2013–14	Sachsenliga	1	23	6	1	99	18	75
2014–15	NOFV-Oberliga Süd (V)	1	23	3	4	82	21	72
2015–16	Regionalliga Nordost (IV)	11	12	8	14	49	48	44
2016–17	Regionalliga Nordost	3	17	9	8	67	42	60
Green marks a season followed by promotion

=== Honours ===
==== League ====
- NOFV-Oberliga Süd (V)
  - Champions: 2014-15
- Sachsenliga (VI)
  - Champions: 2013–14
- Bezirksliga Leipzig (VII)
  - Champions: 2009–10, 2010–11

== Women's football ==
=== History ===
Past seasons
Season	League (tier)	Place
2017–18	Regionalliga Nordost (III)	4
2018–19	Regionalliga Nordost	3
2019–20	Regionalliga Nordost	1
2020–21	2. Frauen-Bundesliga (II)	3
2021–22	2. Frauen-Bundesliga (II)	3
Green marks a season followed by promotion

RB Leipzig entered women's football in 2016. The club initially planned to partner with Leipziger FC 07, forming a joint team in the fourth tier Landesliga Sachsen. The partnership was meant to last for one year, after which RB Leipzig was to continue as an independent, and reserved the right to advance. RB Leipzig and Leipziger FC 07 were given a playing right for the 2016–17 Landesliga Sachsen on a wild card by the Saxony Football Association (SFV). A few weeks before the start of the season, the partnership ended and RB Leipzig announced that it was to compete as an independent.

The first squad gathered 17 players from FFV Leipzig, five talents from the RB Leipzig women's junior teams and one from the reserve team of FF USV Jena. The team was trained by Sebastian Popp, former head coach of women's football team SV Eintracht Leipzig-Süd. The SFV expected the RB Leipzig women's team, with the state training centre for women's and girls' football, to advance from Landesliga Sachsen to Bundesliga within 3 to 5 years.

The team played its first competitive match on 7 August 2016 in the first round of the 2016–17 Saxony Cup away against SV Johannstadt 90. RB Leipzig recorded a 7–0 victory, and advanced to the next round.

The RB Leipzig women's team joined the 2016–17 Landesliga Sachsen (effectively skipping the 5th tier), generating criticism from several clubs. The criticisms were heard, and after a roundtable discussion with other clubs and the SFV, Leipzig offered to play the season starting seven youth players each game. The SFV also ordered the first three games to be replayed and disqualified Leipzig from the Saxony Cup. RB Leipzig won the league with four matchdays.

The team play home matches at the Sportanlage Gontardweg, which is the location of the state training centre for women's and girls football of the SFV, taken over by RB Leipzig from FFV Leipzig in July 2016.

=== Players ===
==== First Team Squad ====
As of 20 September 2022.

Note: Flags indicate national team as defined under FIFA eligibility rules; some limited exceptions apply. Players may hold more than one non-FIFA nationality.

No.	Pos.	Nation	Player
1	GK	GER	Gina Schüller
2	DF	GER	Frederike Kempe
3	DF	GER	Johanna Kaiser
4	DF	GER	Anika Metzner
5	DF	GER	Josefine Schaller
7	MF	SVN	Korina Janež
8	MF	GER	Gianna Rackow
9	MF	DEN	Louise Ringsing
10	MF	GER	Marie-Luise Herrmann
11	MF	GER	Barbara Brecht
12	GK	SUI	Elvira Herzog
13	MF	GER	Lea Mauly

No.	Pos.	Nation	Player
16	MF	GER	Lea-Sophie Misch
17	MF	GER	Emily Reißmann
19	MF	GER	Jenny Hipp
20	DF	GER	Victoria Krug
21	FW	GER	Vanessa Fudalla
22	DF	DEN	Christina Beck
24	DF	GER	Fatma Sakar
26	MF	GER	Luca Graf
27	FW	GER	Marlene Müller
29	FW	GER	Larissa Schreiber
30	FW	MNE	Medina Dešić

==== Honours ====
===== League =====
- Regionalliga Nordost (III)
  - Champions: 2019-20
- Landesliga Sachsen (IV)
  - Champions: 2016-17

===== Cup =====
- Saxony Cup (Note: Also named Landespokal Sachsen.) (de)
  - Champions: 2018-19

== Junior football ==
RB Leipzig had 17 men and women's junior teams totaling 250 players, including the Reserve team as of 2015. 25 players were youth nationals by the turn of the year.

Training and matches are conducted at several grounds. The main ground is the RB training centre at Cottaweg, which is shared with the professional team. Other grounds include the Sportschule Egidius Braun of the Saxony Football Association (SFV) at Abtnaundorf. The RB training center with its sports complex is currently used by men's junior teams from U14 to the Reserve team, as the location of the youth academy.

The club arranges the RB Leipzig Football School several times per year. The school is a multi-day training camp for boys and girls aged between seven and 14 years. A planned training camp in Halle in 2015 was cancelled for security reasons, after threats of violence from local fans.

RB Leipzig partners with SC Pfullendorf. The club cooperated in junior football with local clubs such as 1. FC Lokomotive Leipzig, BSV Schönau 1983 and ESV Delitzsch.

The 17 RB Leipzig junior teams collected 9 league titles and 3 cup titles together during the 2014–15 season. The following season RB Leipzig junior teams collected 8 league titles and 6 cup titles.

=== Men's junior football ===
The A-D junior teams were acquired from FC Sachsen Leipzig in the summer of 2009. After leaving his job as head coach of the professional team in 2010, Vogel served as head coach of the A-junior team, and was then appointed head coach of the reserve team in 2011.

The B-junior team qualified for the Under 17 Bundesliga in 2011. The team then won Under 17 Bundesliga Nord/Nordost and qualified for the German championship for the first time in 2014. The team reached the final, but were defeated by Borussia Dortmund.

The A-junior team qualified for the Under 19 Bundesliga in 2014. Incumbent B-junior coach Frank Leicht was announced as head coach for the 2014–15 season. He was replaced as B-junior coach by Achim Beierlorzer, who had been worked for four years as B-junior coach at SpVgg Greuther Fürth. Achim Beierlorzer was later replaced by incumbent U14 coach Robert Klauß.

The 2014–15 season proved successful. The A-junior team won the Under 19 Bundesliga Nord/Nordost, and the B-junior team returned as champion of the Under 17 Bundesliga Nord/Nordost. RB Leipzig was the only club in Germany with two teams left in the final rounds of the German championship in 2015.

As of 2015, the club had 14 men's junior teams, ranging from U8 to the Reserve team. Two players from the A-junior team, Vitaly Janelt and Dominik Franke, were selected to play for the Germany national under-17 team in the 2015 FIFA U-17 World Cup.

=== Women's junior football ===
In June 2013, RB Leipzig created its first two women's junior football teams (C and D), starting from the 2013–14 season. The C team was to be trained by Mandy Morgenstern and start in the Bezirksliga. The D team was to be trained by Susann Seiring and start in the 1. Kreisklasse.

In June 2016, RB Leipzig took over the state training centre for women's and girls' football of the Saxony Football Association (SFV) at Gontardweg from women's football club FFV Leipzig as of 1 July 2016. The deal followed a period of financial difficulties for FFV Leipzig, which had sought to transfer its youth academy to RB Leipzig. The take over included the U17, U15 and U13 teams of FFV Leipzig, which from the 2016–17 season will be integrated into the RB Leipzig junior teams.

As of 2015, the club had three women's junior teams, ranging from B- to D-juniors. The D-junior team won the 2015–16 Landespokal, collecting the club's first title of the season.

=== Honours ===
==== League ====
- Under 19 Bundesliga North/Northeast
  - Champions: 2014–15
- Under 17 Bundesliga
  - Runners-up: 2014
- Under 17 Bundesliga North/Northeast
  - Champions: 2013–14, 2014–15, 2017–18
  - Runners-up: 2015–16, 2016–17
- Under 19 Regionalliga Nordost (II)
  - Champions: 2013–14
- Under 17 Regionalliga Nordost (II)
  - Champions: 2010–11
- Under 17 Women's Landesliga Sachsen (IV)
  - Champions: 2015-16
  - Runners-up: 2014-15

==== Cup ====
- Under 19 DFB-Pokal (de)
  - Runners-up: 2018-19
- Under 19 Saxony Cup (Note: Also named Landespokal Sachsen.)
  - Winners: (4) 2011–12, 2012–13, 2015–16, 2018-19
- Under 17 NOFV-Pokal (de)
  - Winners: (3) 2012–13, 2015–16, 2017–18
  - Runners-up: 2011-12
- Under 17 Saxony Cup
  - Winners: (6) 2011–12, 2012–13, 2013–14, 2014–15, 2016–17, 2017–18

== Youth academy ==
The RB Leipzig youth academy is multi-layered. It is located at the RB Leipzig training centre at Cottaweg. The establishment of a successful youth academy is an integral part of the club's long-term strategy and philosophy. Red Bull GmbH owner Dietrich Mateschitz said at the club's founding that his hopes were that the majority of the professional team would in the future have come through the ranks of the club's academy. Sporting director Ralf Rangnick said in 2012 that the ambition was to each year inject one or two players from the youth academy to the professional team.

Planning began in 2010, while the first section was opened in August 2011. Shortly after Ralf Ragnick became Sporting director in July 2012, he began an extensive restructuring of the club. RB Leipzig recruited the duo Frieder Schrof and Thomas Albeck from the VfB Stuttgart youth academy in September 2012. Schrof had for years been successfully employed at VfB Stuttgart. During his time at the club, the A- and B-junior teams won 15 German championships and Schrof became head of the youth department. Soon thereafter, RB Leipzig recruited Thomas Schlieck from Schalke 04. Schlieck had previously been employed as goalkeeper coordinator at Schalke 04 and before that worked for twelve years as goalkeeping coach at Arminia Bielefeld. Schlieck became goalkeeper coordinator, responsible for goalkeeper training and development from the U8 to the professional team. He also worked with goalkeeper scouting.

The youth academy became a certified DFB-Youth academy in October 2012.

Expansion began in January 2014. The plans included a 13,500 m^{2} sports complex, with extensive youth facilities. The academy together with three of its schooling partners, the Sächsisches Landesgymnasium für Sport Leipzig, the Sportoberschule Leipzig and the Rahn Dittrich Group in Leipzig, received certificate as DFB-Elite school in November 2014. 105 youth players were enrolled in the partners' schools as of September 2014. Other partners included the Gutenbergschule and the Sportschule Egidius Braun of the Saxony Football Federation (SFV).

The youth academy was certified with the highest rating, three stars and the label "Excellent", by the DFB and the DFL in July 2015. The certificate placed the youth academy among Germany's highest rated.

The sports complex at the RB Training centre was opened in September 2015. The training centre includes a boarding school with rooms for 50 students, more than any other in the Bundesliga. 48 rooms were occupied by players aged between 15 and 19 years by October 2015.

The style of play taught at the academy is aggressive, ball oriented, and run intensive, with forward defense and fast transitions. The youth academy demands supreme discipline from its players. Youth players have to pay attention to their physical shape and also to their appearance. The academy imposes fines for weight gains and its Code of conduct forbids unusual hair styles and tattoos.

The scouting system operates worldwide, in cooperation with other football clubs in the Red Bull sporting portfolio. Up to U11, only children from Leipzig and the immediate vicinity are recruited. Up to U15, players within a radius of 100 kilometres are scouted. From U16 and above, scouting is done worldwide. Asked what type of players the academy looked for, Schrof said that players who come to RB Leipzig, must comply with the club's philosophy: be ball-hunters, be mentally and physically fast.

For scouting purposes, the club arranges an annual "Talent Scouting Day", where boys and girls aged between six and 16 years are considered. The Talent Scouting Day lasts three to five days. Young players are tested in speed, technique training, a 5-a-side tournament and a final match. The most talented players are invited to train with the junior teams. Talent Scouting Day in 2015 had 1,000 applicants, of which 700 were selected. At the end of the day, 90 young players received invitations. Talent Scouting Day in 2015 drew participants from Leipzig and surrounding cities, from Saxony-Anhalt, Thuringia, Berlin, Mecklenburg-Western Pomerania, Lower Saxony, Baden-Württemberg, and even Austria.

The RB Leipzig academy was accused of poaching players from other clubs in questionable ways. One of the first to complain was FC Carl Zeiss Jena in 2012. The club said that young talents had been poached right at its own youth academy and with lucrative offers. Similar complaints came from other clubs in Saxony and Saxony-Anhalt. Later complaints came from Eintracht Frankfurt, after 15-year-old talent Renat Dadachev left the club for RB Leipzig in 2014, allegedly for much higher pay. Shrof reacted in an interview in 2014, saying that the club was not interested in attracting young players with money. He said that young players coming to RB Leipzig for money, have gone to the wrong place, and that the club wants to attract young players with good conditions for development and good education. In another interview in 2015, he added that what the club does is reasonable and legitimate, and like other clubs. In 2015, RB Leipzig was noted for signing the 15-year-old talent Elias Abouchabaka from Hertha BSC for a transfer-fee of 250,000 euros. The signing was preceded by a legal dispute and criticism. RB Leipzig was accused by Hertha BSC for disregarding a Gentlemen's agreement on young talents between the 36 Bundesliga clubs.

The academy cooperates with the youth academies of FC Red Bull Salzburg, New York Red Bulls and Red Bull Brasil. The academy also cooperated with the youth academy of the now dissolved Red Bull Ghana. The cooperation covers several areas, primarily scouting, medicine and training philosophy. The cooperation in scouting forms a network, reaching worldwide. In Europe, scouting is divided. RB Leipzig scouts more to the north, and FC Red Bull Salzburg scouts more to the south.
