= 2022–23 RB Leipzig (women) season =

RB Leipzig
2022–23 season
- Owner: Red Bull GmbH
- CEO: Oliver Mintzlaff
- Head coach: Saban Uzun
- Stadium: Trainingszentrum Platz 1 Stadion am Bad
- 2. Frauen-Bundesliga: 1st
- 2022–23 DFB-Pokal Frauen: Quarter-finals
- Top goalscorer: League: Vanessa Fudalla (12); All: Vanessa Fudalla (13)
- Biggest win: 10-2 vs FC Köln II, 2. Frauen-Bundesliga, 2 October 2022
- Biggest defeat: 2-3 vs Andernach, 2. Frauen-Bundesliga, 6 November 2022
Home colours	Away colours	Third colours
- All statistics correct as of 1 February 2023.

The 2022–23 season is the 7th season in the history of RB Leipzig Women and their third consecutive season in the second division. The club are participating in the 2. Frauen-Bundesliga and the DFB-Pokal Frauen.

On 10 June 2022, the club announced that Saban Uzan would be the team's new coach after Katja Greulich left the post to take the same job at FC Basel. Uzan returns to management after a sabbatical having previously managed VfL Sindelfingen's women's team in the Frauen-Bundesliga and Wolfsburg's U-23 squad.

== Competitions ==
=== Overall record ===
Competition	First match	Last match	Starting round	Record							
Competition	First match	Last match	Starting round	Pld	W	D	L	GF	GA	GD	Win %
2. Frauen-Bundesliga	28 August 2022	29 May 2023	Matchday 1	11	9	1	1	38	11	+27	81.82
DFB-Pokal Frauen	11 September 2022	TBD	Round of 32	2	2	0	0	8	1	+7	100.00
Total				13	11	1	1	46	12	+34	84.62

Last updated: 5 February 2023
Source: Soccerway

=== 2. Frauen-Bundesliga ===
==== League table ====
Pos	Team	Pld	W	D	L	GF	GA	GD	Pts	Promotion or relegation
1	RB Leipzig (C, P)	26	21	1	4	84	23	+61	64	Promotion to Bundesliga
2	1. FC Nürnberg (P)	26	17	1	8	54	31	+23	52	Promotion to Bundesliga
3	FSV Gütersloh	26	16	3	7	49	29	+20	51	
4	Bayern Munich II (Note: Reserve teams cannot compete in the Frauen-Bundesliga and are therefore ineligible for promotion.)	26	13	4	9	35	28	+7	43	
5	SG Andernach	26	11	9	6	62	39	+23	42	

Source: DFB
Rules for classification: 1) Points; 2) Goal difference; 3) Goals scored; 4) Head-to-head results; 5) Head-to-head away goals scored; 6) Away goals scored; 7) Play-off.
(C) Champions; (P) Promoted

=== DFB-Pokal Frauen ===
11 September 2022 Second round	Türkiyemspor Berlin	0–6	RB Leipzig	Berlin
14:00		Report	Fudalla 10'; Hipp 22', 49'; Brecht 44'; Schreiber 50'; Dešić 75'	Stadium: Willi-Kressmann-Stadion; Attendance: 153; Referee: Irina Stremel

19 November 2022 Round of 16	RB Leipzig	2–1	Eintracht Frankfurt	Leipzig
12:00	Müller 53', 89'	Report	Freigang 16'	Stadium: Trainingszentrum Platz 1 Attendance: 1,300; Referee: Franziska Wildfeuer

28 February 2023 Quarter-finals	RB Leipzig	v	SGS Essen	Leipzig
18:00		Report		Stadium: Trainingszentrum Platz 1
