= 2023–24 FC Bayern Munich II (women) season =

Bayern Munich II (women)
2023–24 season
- President: Herbert Hainer
- Head Coach: Clara Schöne
- Stadium: Sportpark Aschheim, Aschheim, Bavaria
- 2. Frauen-Bundesliga: 6th

The 2023–24 FC Bayern Munich II (women) season started on 20 August 2023. The Bayern Munich II women's team finished in fourth place in the 2022–23 2. Frauen-Bundesliga season. On 21 June 2023, the German Football Association announced that the Bayern Munich women's team received their license, along with the rest Frauen-Bundesliga and 2. Frauen-Bundesliga clubs, for the 2023–24 season.

== Season review ==
=== August ===
Bayern Munich II opened up their season against SV Weinberg. The match took place on 20 August 2023 at Sportpark Aschheim in Aschheim, Bavaria. The match finished in a 1–1 draw. Bayern Munich II's goal came from an own goal from Mara Grimm and Leonie Haberäcker scored SV Weinberg's goal. Bayern Munich II and SV Weinberg finished matchday one tied for eighth place. Matchday two was against 1899 Hoffenheim II and took place on 27 August 2023 at Ensinger-Stadion. Bayern Munich II won 2–0 with goals from Carla Schwarz and Celina Senftl. Bayern Munich II moved up to sixth place.

=== September ===
Bayern Munich II started September with a match against VfL Wolfsburg II. The match took place on 3 September 2023 at Sportpark Aschheim in Aschheim. Carla Schwarz scored for Bayern Munich II and Sury Lamontana and Yasu Wöhrn scored for VfL Wolfsburg II. Bayern Munich II remained in sixth place. Bayern Munich II faced Turbine Potsdam on 17 September 2023 at Karl-Liebknecht-Stadion in Potsdam, Brandenburg. Turbine Potsdam won 1–0 with a goal from Viktoria Schwalm. Bayern Munich II dropped down to eighth place.

=== October ===
Bayern Munich II started October with a match against SG Andernach. The match took place on 1 October 2023 at Sportpark Aschheim in Aschheim. The match finished in a 1–1 draw. Franziska Kett scored for Bayern Munich II and Leonie Stöhr scored for SG Andernach. Bayern Munich II finished matchday five in 10th place. The next match was against Borussia Mönchengladbach on 8 October 2023 at Grenzlandstadion in Mönchengladbach. Borussia Mönchengladbach won the match 2–1. Carla Schwarz scored for Bayern Munich II. Sarah Schmitz and Emily Tichelkamp scored for Borussia Mönchengladbach. Bayern Munich II dropped down to 11th place. Bayern Munich II went on to lose against FC Ingolstadt. Bayern Munich II lost 1–0. Bayern Munich II dropped down to 12th place.

== 2. Frauen-Bundesliga ==
=== League results ===
| Date | Opponent | Venue | Results F–A | Bayern Munich II goalscorers | Attendance | Pos. | Ref. |
|---|---|---|---|---|---|---|---|
| 20 August 2023 | SV Weinberg | Home | 1–1 | Grimm (O.G.) | 88 | T8th | |
| 27 August 2023 | 1899 Hoffenheim II | Away | 2–0 | Schwarz, Senftl | 75 | 6th | |
| 3 September 2023 | VfL Wolfsburg II | Home | 1–2 | Schwarz | 57 | 6th | |
| 17 September 2023 | Turbine Potsdam | Away | 0–1 | — | 739 | 8th | |
| 1 October 2023 | SG Andernach | Home | 1–1 | Kett | 64 | 10th | |
| 8 October 2023 | Borussia Mönchengladbach | Away | 1–2 | Schwarz | 308 | 11th | |
| 15 October 2023 | FC Ingolstadt | Home | 0–1 | — | 112 | 12th | |
| 22 October 2023 | SV Meppen | Away | | | | | |
| 5 November 2023 | Carl Zeiss Jena | Home | | | | | |
| 12 November 2023 | SC Sand | Away | | | | | |
| 19 November 2023 | Hamburger SV | Away | | | | | |
| 10 December 2023 | FSV Gütersloh | Home | | | | | |
| 17 December 2023 | Eintracht Frankfurt II | Away | | | | | |
| 18 February 2024 | SV Weinberg | Away | | | | | |
| 3 March 2024 | 1899 Hoffenheim II | Home | | | | | |
| 10 March 2024 | VfL Wolfsburg II | Away | | | | | |
| 17 March 2024 | Turbine Potsdam | Home | | | | | |
| 24 March 2024 | SG Andernach | Away | | | | | |
| 31 March 2024 | Borussia Mönchengladbach | Home | | | | | |
| 14 April 2024 | FC Ingolstadt | Away | | | | | |
| 21 April 2024 | SV Meppen | Home | | | | | |
| 28 April 2024 | Carl Zeiss Jena | Away | | | | | |
| 5 May 2024 | SC Sand | Home | | | | | |
| 12 May 2024 | Hamburger SV | Home | | | | | |
| 19 May 2024 | FSV Gütersloh | Away | | | | | |
| 26 May 2024 | Eintracht Frankfurt II | Home | | | | | |

=== League table ===
| Pos | Team | Pld | W | D | L | GF | GA | GD | Pts | Qualification or relegation |
|---|---|---|---|---|---|---|---|---|---|---|
| 1 | Turbine Potsdam (C, P) | 26 | 17 | 4 | 5 | 37 | 18 | +19 | 55 | Promotion to Bundesliga |
| 2 | Carl Zeiss Jena (P) | 26 | 16 | 6 | 4 | 58 | 28 | +30 | 54 | Promotion to Bundesliga |
| 3 | SV Meppen | 26 | 16 | 5 | 5 | 46 | 14 | +32 | 53 | |
| 4 | Hamburger SV | 26 | 15 | 5 | 6 | 58 | 33 | +25 | 50 | |
| 5 | SG Andernach | 26 | 13 | 7 | 6 | 42 | 32 | +10 | 46 | |
| 6 | SC Sand | 26 | 12 | 7 | 7 | 45 | 32 | +13 | 43 | |
| 7 | FSV Gütersloh | 26 | 12 | 6 | 8 | 46 | 39 | +7 | 42 | |
| 8 | Eintracht Frankfurt II (Note: Reserve teams cannot compete in the Frauen-Bundesliga and are therefore ineligible for promotion.) | 26 | 11 | 4 | 11 | 33 | 35 | −2 | 37 | |
| 9 | Borussia Mönchengladbach | 26 | 8 | 7 | 11 | 31 | 38 | −7 | 31 | |
| 10 | FC Ingolstadt | 26 | 7 | 6 | 13 | 26 | 43 | −17 | 27 | |
| 11 | Bayern Munich II | 26 | 6 | 5 | 15 | 33 | 42 | −9 | 23 | |
| 12 | SV 67 Weinberg (Note: Although finishing in 12th place and in the relegation zone, Weinberg was not relegated as MSV Duisburg did not take their spot in the 2024–25 2. Frauen-Bundesliga.) | 26 | 5 | 5 | 16 | 31 | 62 | −31 | 20 | |
| 13 | VfL Wolfsburg II (R) | 26 | 4 | 4 | 18 | 20 | 60 | −40 | 16 | Relegation to Regionalliga |
| 14 | TSG Hoffenheim II (R) | 26 | 3 | 3 | 20 | 19 | 49 | −30 | 12 | Relegation to Regionalliga |

Source: DFB
Rules for classification: 1) Points; 2) Goal difference; 3) Goals scored; 4) Head-to-head results; 5) Head-to-head away goals scored; 6) Away goals scored; 7) Play-off.
(C) Champions; (P) Promoted; (R) Relegated

=== Results summary ===
| Overall | | | | | | | | Home | | | | | | Away | | | | | |
| Pld | W | D | L | GF | GA | GD | Pts | W | D | L | GF | GA | GD | W | D | L | GF | GA | GD |
|---|---|---|---|---|---|---|---|---|---|---|---|---|---|---|---|---|---|---|---|
| 5 | 1 | 2 | 2 | 5 | 5 | 0 | 5 | 0 | 2 | 1 | 3 | 4 | −1 | 1 | 0 | 1 | 2 | 1 | +1 |

Last updated: 21 October 2023.
Source: League results

== Roster and statistics ==
=== Roster, appearances, goals, and discipline ===
==== Roster, appearances, goals, and discipline ====
Roster, appearances, goals, minutes played and discipline
| Players | App. | Gls. | Discipline | | |
| Players | App. | Gls. | Yellow card | (yellow card) (red card) | Red card |
Goalkeepers
| Veronika Litzlfelder | 0 | 0 | 0 | 0 | 0 |
| Juliane Schmid | 3 | 0 | 0 | 0 | 0 |
Defenders
| Merita Gashi | 0 | 0 | 0 | 0 | 0 |
| Jana Kappes | 3 | 0 | 0 | 0 | 0 |
| Theresa Keitel | 3 | 0 | 0 | 0 | 0 |
| Luise Reinwald | 0 | 0 | 0 | 0 | 0 |
| Eszter Reszler | 3 | 0 | 2 | 0 | 0 |
| Carlotta Schwoerer | 3 | 0 | 0 | 0 | 0 |
Midfielders
| Ella Blücher | 1 | 0 | 0 | 0 | 0 |
| Antonia Dehm | 3 | 0 | 0 | 0 | 0 |
| Sarah Ernst | 0 | 0 | 0 | 0 | 0 |
| Nike Herrmann | 3 | 0 | 1 | 0 | 0 |
| Melina Hoffmann | 2 | 0 | 0 | 0 | 0 |
| Greta Hünten | 0 | 0 | 0 | 0 | 0 |
| Lisa Karl | 3 | 0 | 0 | 0 | 0 |
| Stefanie Reischmann | 3 | 0 | 0 | 0 | 0 |
| Leonie Reß | 3 | 0 | 0 | 0 | 0 |
| Carla Schwarz | 3 | 2 | 0 | 0 | 0 |
| Celina Senftl | 3 | 1 | 0 | 0 | 0 |
| Sophia Weixler | 1 | 0 | 0 | 0 | 0 |
Forwards
| Moria Engelberg | 0 | 0 | 0 | 0 | 0 |
| Laura Gloning | 0 | 0 | 0 | 0 | 0 |
| Paula Rintzner | 2 | 0 | 0 | 0 | 0 |
| Amelie Roduner | 0 | 0 | 0 | 0 | 0 |

==== Goalscorers ====
Goalscorers from the 2. Frauen-Bundesliga
| Player | Goals |
|---|---|
| Carla Schwarz | 2 |
| Celina Senftl | 1 |
| Own goals | 1 |

==== Own goals ====
Own goals by Bayern Munich II
| No. | Player | Competition | Opponent | Final score | Ref. |
|---|---|---|---|---|---|
| 1 | None–to–date | | | — | |

Own goals by opposing players
| No. | Player | Competition | Team | Final score | Ref. |
|---|---|---|---|---|---|
| 1 | Mara Grimm | 2. Frauen-Bundesliga | 1899 Hoffenheim II | 2–0 | |

=== Clean sheets ===
Clean sheets
| No. | Goalkeeper | Opponent | Final score | Ref. |
|---|---|---|---|---|
| 1 | Juliane Schmid | 1899 Hoffenheim II | 2–0 | |
