= Lena Ostermeier =

German association football player

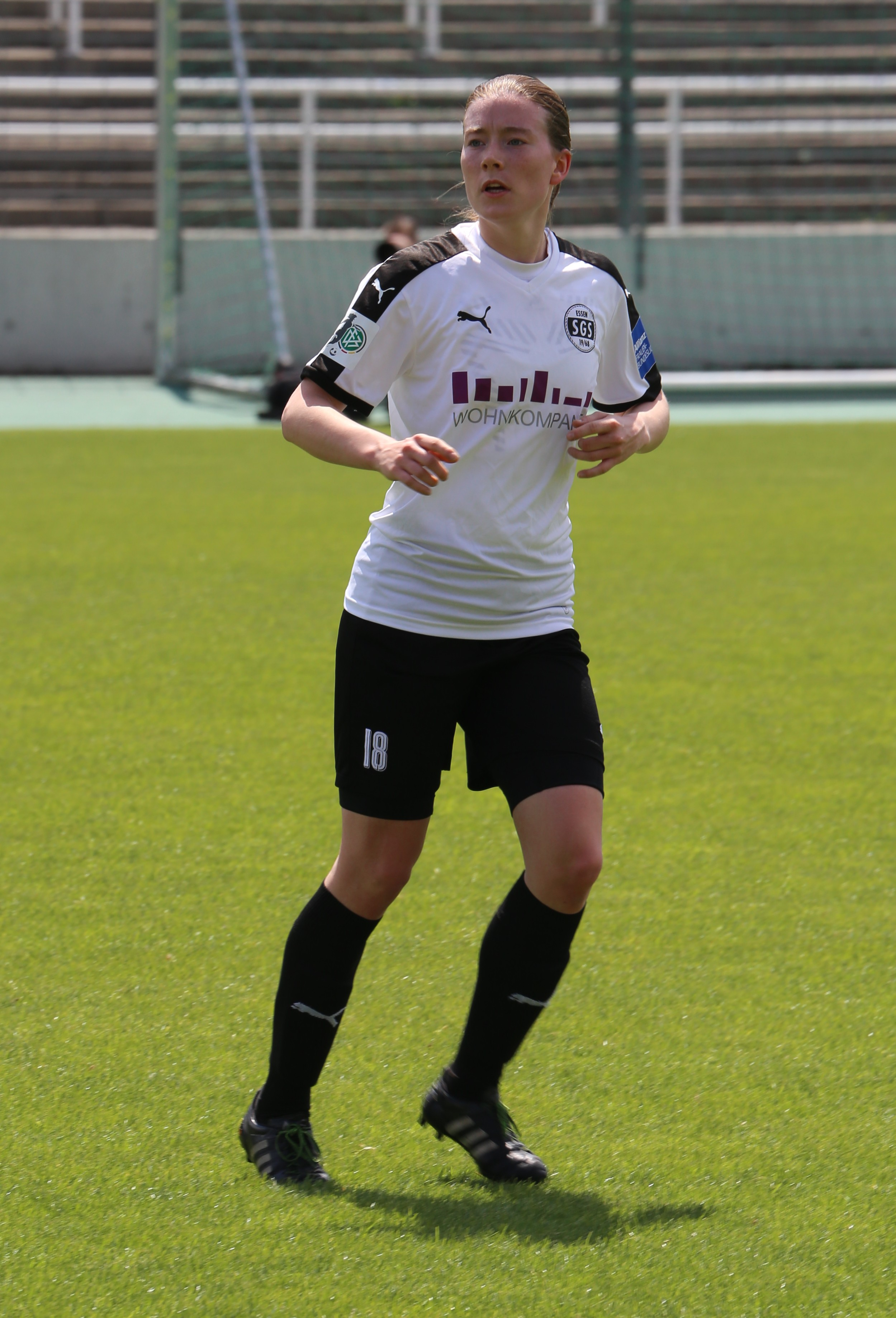
- Ostermeier in 2017

Personal information
- Date of birth: 1 October 1996 (age 30)
- Place of birth: Schwerte, Germany
- Height: 1.68 m (5 ft 6 in)
- Position: Midfielder

Team information
- Current team: Borussia Dortmund
- Number: 18

Youth career
- –2012: SF Sölderholz 1893
- 2012–2013: SGS Essen

Senior career*
Years	Team	Apps	(Gls)
2013–2014	SGS Essen II	19	(0)
2013–2026	SGS Essen	211	(4)
2026–	Borussia Dortmund	12	(1)

International career
2014	Germany U19	2	(0)
- * Club domestic league appearances and goals as of 20 November 2026

Lena Ostermeier (born 1 October 1996) is a German footballer who plays as a midfielder for Borussia Dortmund].

== Career ==
Ostermeier started playing football in Dortmund with the Sportfreunde Sölderholz in 1893 and went through several youth departments.

In the summer of 2012 she moved from the B-juniors at SF Sölderholz 1893 to SGS Essen in the youth department and played with the B-juniors in the newly founded Bundesliga West/Southwest. Due to a reduced squad due to injury, Ostermeier was promoted from the U-17 to the Bundesliga squad at the beginning of 2013.

On 31 March 2013, at the age of 16, she made her Bundesliga debut in the away game at VfL Wolfsburg when she came on as a substitute for Linda Dallmann in the 89th minute of the game.

In the 2023–24 season, she scored the winner in the 1-0 away victory against 1. FC Köln.

On June 9, 2026, she moved to the Regionalliga club Borussia Dortmund.

== Personal life ==
Ostermeier has a Dr. rer. nat. on the topic "Stability of selected liquid-liquid phase separations in biomolecular systems" from 2023. She wrote this at the TU Dortmund in the Faculty of Chemistry and Chemical Biology in the Department of Physical Chemistry with Prof. (ret.) Roland Winter.
