= Vanessa Fudalla =

German footballer (born 2001)

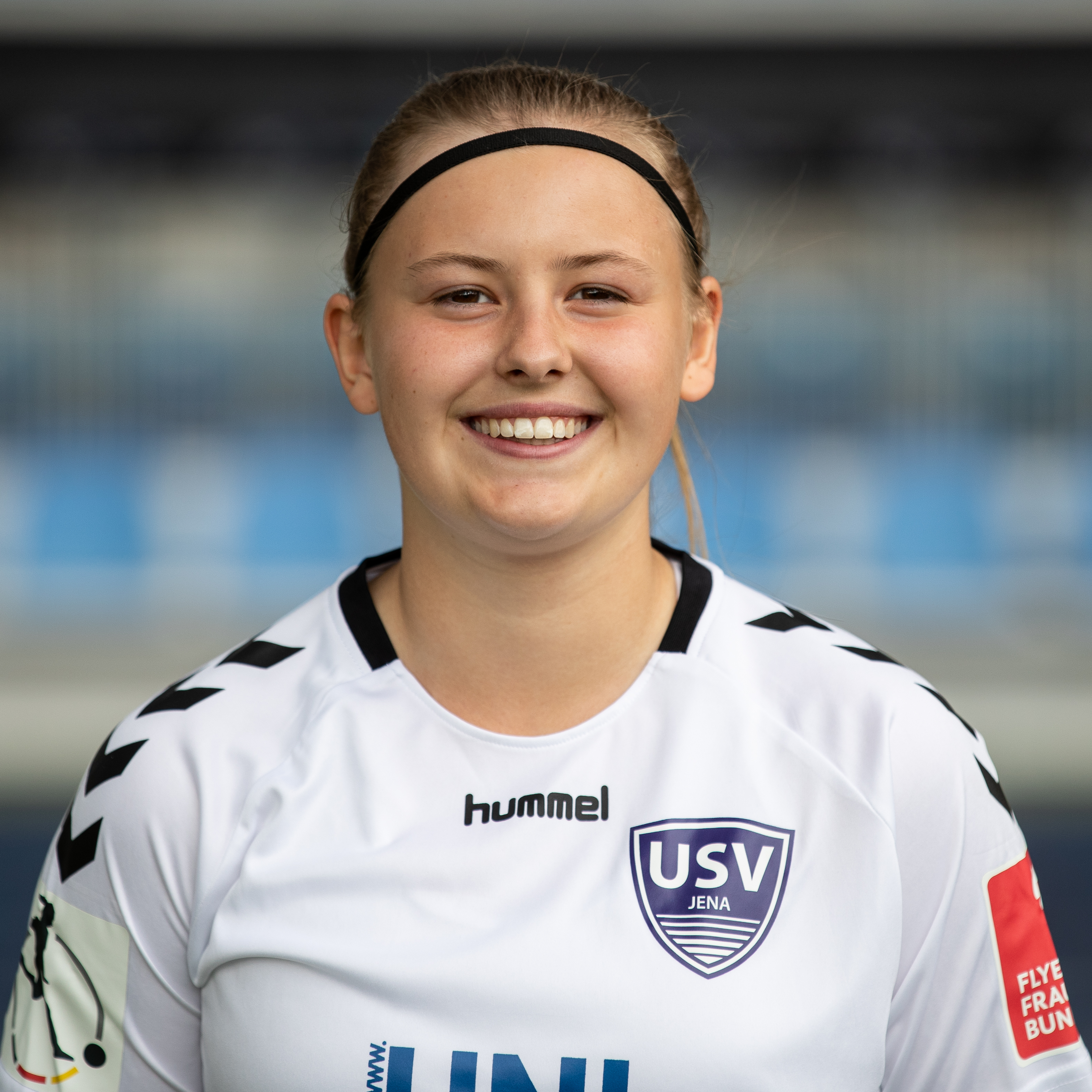
- Fudalla with Carl Zeiss Jena in 2019

Personal information
- Date of birth: 21 October 2001 (age 25)
- Place of birth: Nuremberg, Germany
- Height: 1.55 m (5 ft 1 in)
- Positions: Midfielder; forward

Team information
- Current team: Bayer Leverkusen
- Number: 21

Youth career
- 2015–2017: 1. FC Nürnberg
- 2017–2018: Bayern Munich

Senior career*
Years	Team	Apps	(Gls)
2017–2019	Bayern Munich II	33	(20)
2019–2020	Carl Zeiss Jena	17	(2)
2020–2025	RB Leipzig	95	(63)
2025–	Bayer Leverkusen	33	(14)

International career
2015–2016	Germany U15	5	(0)
2017	Germany U16	6	(0)
2017–2018	Germany U17	19	(8)
2019	Germany U19	3	(6)
2024–2025	Germany U23	4	(1)
- * Club domestic league appearances and goals as of 20 November 2026

Vanessa Fudalla (born 21 October 2001) is a German professional footballer who plays as a midfielder and forward for Frauen-Bundesliga club Bayer Leverkusen.

== Career ==
=== Youth ===
After starting her footballing career at local club DJK Langwasser in 2007, Fudalla moved around multiple clubs in the area until entering the 1. FC Nürnberg youth ranks in 2015. She moved to the under-17s at Bayern Munich two years later; that year Fudalla made her senior team debut for Bayern II in the 2. Bundesliga against Saarbrücken. Her first goal came in March 2018 during a win against Sindelfingen.

=== Bayern Munich II ===
Her debut for Bayern Munich II came on 12 November 2017 when she was substituted for Melanie Kuenrath in 68th minute. She scored her first goal on 18 March 2018 in a 3–1 win against VfL Sindelfingen with the goal to make it 2–1 in the 59th minute. Fudalla and Bayern II won the 2. Bundesliga, as she scored 17 goals to finish second in the goal scoring charts. However, as the second team of a first-division side, Bayern II were denied promotion to the Bundesliga.

=== FF USV Jena ===
Fudalla progressed to the Bundesliga ahead of the 2019–20 season, signing for newly-promoted club FF USV Jena. Her Bundesliga debut came on the first matchday on 17 August 2019 in the home game against TSG 1899 Hoffenheim, which ended in a 6–1 defeat. She scored her first Bundesliga goal on the fourth matchday on 22 September 2019 home against 1. FC Köln with a penalty kick in the 71st minute to bring the final score to a 2–2 draw. The team failed to win a game throughout the season and was eventually relegated, with Fudalla scoring two goals.

=== RB Leipzig ===
During the subsequent summer, Fudalla moved to RB Leipzig. After three seasons in the 2. Bundesliga, Fudalla fired Leipzig to promotion during the 2022–23 campaign, becoming the league's most prolific player with 20 goals.

Back in the top flight for the 2023–24 season, Fudalla made her first game-changing contribution during Leipzig's first home game in the Bundesliga, lobbing Essen's keeper for her first goal and executing a short solo run for her second, which eventually brought the team a 3–2 victory. The team struggled from thereon out, taking just one point from the subsequent five games. Fudalla returned to the scoring charts with a shot from range in a 1–1 draw versus Leverkusen, before taking home an assist to Lydia Andrade in a loss against Hoffenheim. Following the winter break, the German began starring in the division, scoring once versus Cologne, twice during a spectacular 4–4 draw in Essen and both goals in an upset victory against Eintracht Frankfurt. She scored both goals in the 2–1 home victory against Eintracht Frankfurt.

== Career statistics ==
As of match played 20 November 2026

Appearances and goals by club, season and competition
Club	Season	League			DFB-Pokal		Total	
Club	Season	Division	Apps	Goals	Apps	Goals	Apps	Goals
Bayern Munich II	2017–18	2. Frauen-Bundesliga Süd	11	1	—		11	1
Bayern Munich II	2018–19	2. Frauen-Bundesliga	22	17	—		22	17
Bayern Munich II	Total		33	18	—		33	18
FF USV Jena	2019–20	Frauen-Bundesliga	17	2	—		17	2
RB Leipzig	2020–21	2. Frauen-Bundesliga Nord	6	6	3	0	9	6
RB Leipzig	2021–22	2. Frauen-Bundesliga	26	17	2	1	28	18
RB Leipzig	2022–23	2. Frauen-Bundesliga	19	20	4	3	23	23
RB Leipzig	2023–24	Frauen-Bundesliga	22	10	2	2	24	12
RB Leipzig	2024–25	Frauen-Bundesliga	22	10	1	0	23	10
RB Leipzig	Total		95	63	12	6	107	69
Bayer Leverkusen	2025–26	Frauen-Bundesliga	25	14	2	0	27	14
Bayer Leverkusen	2026–27	Frauen-Bundesliga	8	0	0	0	8	0
Bayer Leverkusen	Total		33	14	2	0	35	14
Career total			161	95	14	6	175	101

== Honours ==
RB Leipzig

- 2. Frauen-Bundesliga: 2022–23
