= Nike Herrmann =

German footballer

Personal information
- Full name: Nike Herrmann
- Date of birth: 30 March 2002 (age 24)
- Place of birth: Germany
- Position: Midfielder

Youth career
- –2019: Bayern Munich (women)

Senior career*
Years	Team	Apps	(Gls)
2019–	Bayern Munich II (women)	47	(2)
- * Club domestic league appearances and goals as of 15:07, 22 December 2023 (UTC)

Nike Herrmann is a German footballer who currently plays as a defender for Bayern Munich II (women) in the 2. Frauen-Bundesliga.

== Career ==
Herrmann came up through the Bayern Munich youth system and made her debut for Bayern Munich's reserve team in the 2019–20 2. Frauen-Bundesliga.

== Career statistics ==
As of match played 17 September 2023

Appearances and goals by club, season and competition
Club	Season	League		
Club	Season	Division	Apps	Goals
Bayern Munich II	2019–20	2. Frauen-Bundesliga	3	0
Bayern Munich II	2020–21	2. Frauen-Bundesliga	10	1
Bayern Munich II	2021–22	2. Frauen-Bundesliga	14	1
Bayern Munich II	2022–23	2. Frauen-Bundesliga	16	1
Bayern Munich II	2023–24	2. Frauen-Bundesliga	4	0
Bayern Munich II	Total		47	2
Career Total			47	2
