= Frederike Kempe =

German footballer (born 1997)

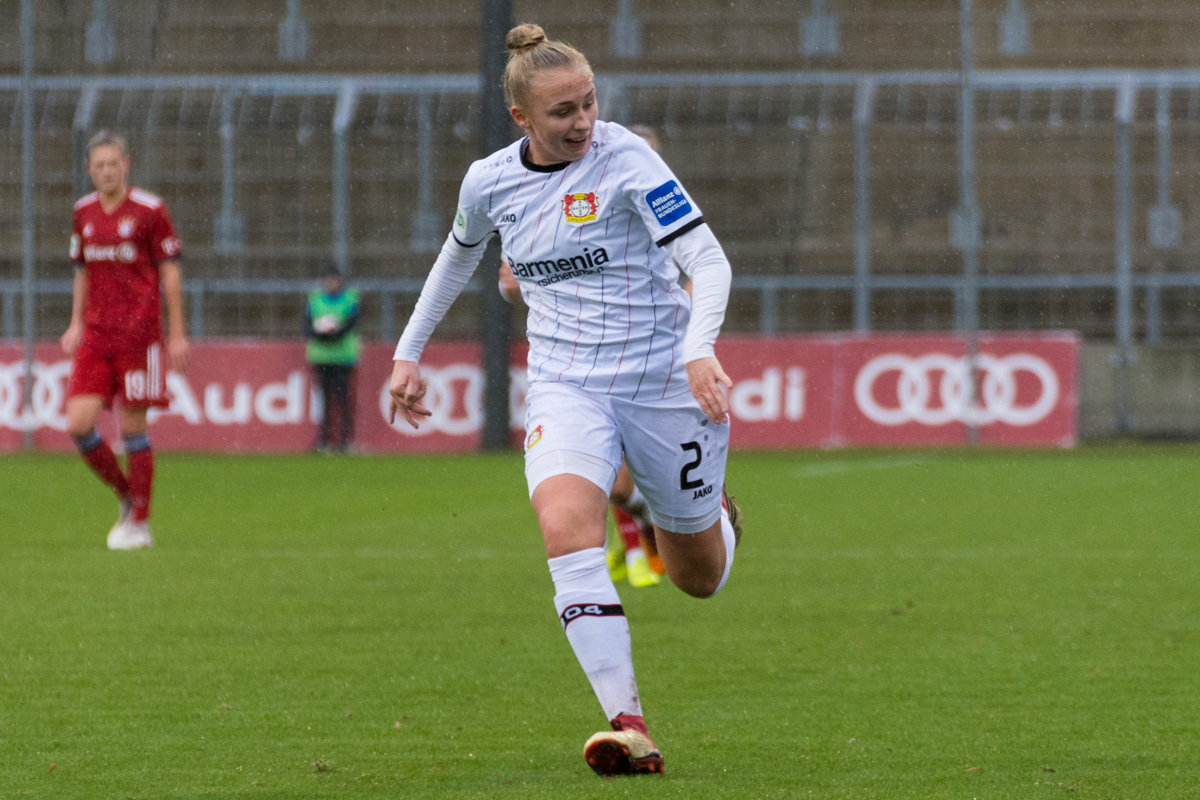
- Kempe in 2018

Personal information
- Date of birth: 10 February 1997 (age 29)
- Place of birth: Germany
- Height: 1.69 m (5 ft 7 in)
- Position: Defender

Team information
- Current team: Borussia Dortmund
- Number: 21

Senior career*
Years	Team	Apps	(Gls)
2014–2015	FSV Gütersloh 2009	17	(0)
2015–2021	Bayer Leverkusen	74	(2)
2021–2025	RB Leipzig	63	(4)
2025–	Borussia Dortmund	34	(9)

International career
2013	Germany U16	1	(0)
2015–2016	Germany U19	4	(0)
2016	Germany U20	3	(0)
- * Club domestic league appearances and goals as of 20 November 2026

Frederike Kempe (born 10 February 1997) is a German professional footballer who plays as a midfielder for Frauen-Regionalliga West club Borussia Dortmund.

== Career ==
Kempe started her career at FSV Gütersloh 2009, before joining Bayer Leverkusen in 2015. In 2021, she signed for RB Leipzig.

== Honours ==
RB Leipzig

- 2. Frauen-Bundesliga: 2022–23
