= Lydia Andrade =

Swiss footballer

Personal information
- Full name: Lydia Nunes Martins Andrade
- Date of birth: 20 February 1999 (age 27)
- Place of birth: Grabs, Switzerland
- Height: 1.67 m (5 ft 6 in)
- Position: Midfielder

Team information
- Current team: 1. FC Köln
- Number: 17

Youth career
- 2009–2014: FC Haag
- 2014–2015: FC St. Gallen
- 2015: FC Haag
- 2015–2016: FC St. Gallen
- 2016–2019: FC Zürich

Senior career*
Years	Team	Apps	(Gls)
2019–2022	FC Zürich	46	(16)
2022–2023	SV Meppen	22	(1)
2023–2025	RB Leipzig	37	(5)
2025–	1. FC Köln	26	(8)

International career^{‡}
2024-	Switzerland	7	(0)
- * Club domestic league appearances and goals as of 21 November 2026 ‡ National team caps and goals as of 12:12, 10 October 2026 (UTC)

Lydia Nunes Martins Andrade (born 20 February 1999) is a Swiss professional footballer who plays as a forward for Frauen-Bundesliga club 1. FC Köln and the Switzerland national team.

Born in Grabs, Switzerland, to Angolan parents, Andrade holds dual Swiss and Angolan citizenship.

== Career ==
Having played for FC Zürich throughout her youth, Andrade made her senior team debut for the teams under-21s in October 2017. She progressed to the senior team in 2019 and remained with the team until 2022, winning a league and cup double in her final season. In the summer of 2022, Andrade signed for newly-promoted Bundesliga side SV Meppen. After finishing eleventh and being relegated on the final matchday, the Swiss player moved to RB Leipzig, penning a two-year contract. She scored her first two goals for Leipzig in a second-round DFB-Pokal tie against Gütersloh, before marking her first league goal in a 1-3 loss to Eintracht Frankfurt. In 2025, she signed a two-year contract at fellow Bundesliga side 1. FC Köln.

== Career statistics ==
=== Club ===
As of match played 21 November 2026

Appearances and goals by club, season and competition
Club	Season	League			National cup (Note: Includes Swiss Cup, DFB-Pokal)		Continental		Other		Total	
Club	Season	Division	Apps	Goals	Apps	Goals	Apps	Goals	Apps	Goals	Apps	Goals
FC Zürich	2019–20	Swiss Super League	13	1	2	1	2 (Note: Appearances in UEFA Women's Champions League)	0	—		17	2
FC Zürich	2020–21	Swiss Super League	21	10	4	1	2	0	—		27	11
FC Zürich	2021–22	Swiss Super League	12	5	4	1	2	0	5	2	23	8
FC Zürich	Total		46	16	10	3	6	0	5	2	67	21
SV Meppen	2022–23	Frauen-Bundesliga	22	1	2	0	—		—		24	1
RB Leipzig	2023–24	Frauen-Bundesliga	22	4	2	2	—		—		24	6
RB Leipzig	2024–25	Frauen-Bundesliga	15	1	1	0	—		—		16	1
RB Leipzig	Total		37	5	3	2	0	0	0	0	40	7
1. FC Köln	2025–26	Frauen-Bundesliga	15	4	1	1	—		—		16	5
1. FC Köln	2026–27	Frauen-Bundesliga	11	4	1	0	—		—		12	4
1. FC Köln	Total		26	8	2	1	0	0	0	0	28	8
Career total			111	29	16	6	6	0	5	2	159	38

=== International ===
As of match played 9 October 2026

Appearances and goals by national team and year
National team	Year	Apps	Goals
Switzerland
Switzerland	2024	5	0
Switzerland	2025	0	0
Switzerland	2026	2	0
Total		7	0
