= Eszter Reszler =

German footballer

Personal information
- Full name: Eszter Reszler
- Date of birth: 12 September 2006 (age 20)
- Place of birth: Germany
- Position: Defender

Youth career
- –2023: Bayern Munich (women)

Senior career*
Years	Team	Apps	(Gls)
2022–	Bayern Munich II (women)	17	(1)
- * Club domestic league appearances and goals as of 00:45, 22 December 2023 (UTC)

Eszter Reszler is a German footballer who currently plays as a defender for Bayern Munich II (women) in the 2. Frauen-Bundesliga.

== Career ==
Reszler came up through Bayern Munich's youth system and made her debut for the reserve team in the 2022–23 2. Frauen-Bundesliga season.

== Career statistics ==
As of match played 19 May 2023

Appearances and goals by club, season and competition
Club	Season	League		
Club	Season	Division	Apps	Goals
Bayern Munich II	2022–23	2. Frauen-Bundesliga	4	0
Bayern Munich II	2023–24	2. Frauen-Bundesliga	22	1
Bayern Munich II	Total		26	1
Career Total			26	1
