= Juliane Schmid =

German footballer (born 2004)

Personal information
- Full name: Juliane Schmid
- Date of birth: 15 July 2004 (age 22)
- Place of birth: Germany
- Position: Goalkeeper

Team information
- Current team: Turbine Potsdam

Youth career
- –2021: Bayern Munich (women)

Senior career*
Years	Team	Apps	(Gls)
2020–2025	Bayern Munich II	34	(0)
2025	Rheindorf Altach	6	(0)
2025-2026	TSG Hoffenheim II	1	(0)
2025-2026	TSG Hoffenheim	0	(0)
2023–	Turbine Potsdam	0	(0)
- * Club domestic league appearances and goals as of 5 July 2026

Juliane Schmid is a German footballer who currently plays as a goalkeeper for 2. Frauen-Bundesliga club Turbine Potsdam.

== Career ==
Schmid cam up through the youth system of Bayern Munich (women). Her first season with Bayern Munich II (women) was the 2020–21 season where she made six appearances.

== Career statistics ==
As of match played 17 December 2023

Appearances and goals by club, season and competition
Club	Season	League		
Club	Season	Division	Apps	Goals
Bayern Munich II	2020–21	2. Frauen-Bundesliga	6	0
Bayern Munich II	2021–22	2. Frauen-Bundesliga	11	0
Bayern Munich II	2022–23	2. Frauen-Bundesliga	4	0
Bayern Munich II	2023–24	2. Frauen-Bundesliga	13	0
Bayern Munich II	Total		34	0
Career Total			34	0
