= Christina Beck =

Danish association football player

Personal information
- Full name: Christina Beck
- Date of birth: 21 August 1996 (age 30)
- Place of birth: Skærbæk, Tønder Municipality, Denmark
- Position: Defender

Senior career*
Years	Team	Apps	(Gls)
2017–2019	Kolding IF	26	(0)
2019–2021	AGF	37	(2)
2021–2022	Brøndby IF	32	(2)
2022–2023	RB Leipzig	16	(0)
Total		111	(4)
- * Club domestic league appearances and goals

Christina Beck (born 21 August 1996) is a Danish former professional footballer who played as a defender.

== Honours ==
RB Leipzig

- 2. Frauen-Bundesliga: 2022–23
