= Best Secret GmbH =

E-commerce company based in Dornach, Germany

BESTSECRET
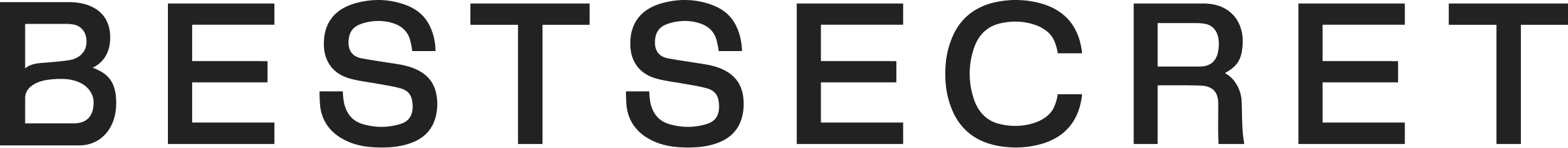
- Founded: 2007
- Headquarters: Aschheim (Dornach), Munich (district), Upper Bavaria, Germany
- Key people: Managing Directors: Dr. Moritz Hahn, Axel Salzmann, Dr. Andreas Reichhart, Dominik Rief
- Number of employees: 1400-1600
- Parent: Schustermann & Borenstein GmbH

The BESTSECRET, a subsidiary of Schustermann & Borenstein GmbH, is an e-commerce company for designer merchandise based in Dornach (near Munich), Germany. Best Secret functions as a closed shopping community.

== History ==
The beginning of Schustermann & Borenstein date back to 1924. The traditional family-run business is run by the third generation. BESTSECRET was founded as a subsidiary of Schustermann & Borenstein in 2007 to create an online presence.

== Business Model ==
BESTSECRET's works as a closed shopping community. This means that the offers are only available to registered members and these members have access to a selection of permanently reduced designer merchandise. In order to maintain this pricing policy and yet protect the exclusivity of the brands, access to the online store is limited to 250,000 members. A prospective user must be recommended by an existing member to gain access. However, the COO, Marian Schikora, will review any new recommendation to ensure that the total number of members is kept low (for example, only a limited number of people per region can become members).

== Internationalization ==
The company is active in Germany, Greece, Austria, Switzerland, France, Sweden, Latvia, Netherlands, Slovenia, Croatia, Italy, Ireland, Belgium, Bulgaria, Romania and Cyprus. In addition, Best Secret GmbH acquired the Swiss online fashion retailer FashionFriends on April 1, 2016.

== Investors ==
In 2012, Schustermann & Borenstein sold two-thirds of its shares to Axa Private Equity Group (now Ardian), which included shares in BESTSECRET. The remaining shares remained family-owned by Daniel Schustermann, Emil Schustermann, Benno Borenstein and Daniel Borenstein, who continue to run the operating business.

In 2016, Ardian sold the Schustermann & Borenstein and BestSecret company shares to Permira. The enterprise value lay approximately between 700 and 750 million euro.

In 2020, Moritz Hahn (former SVP at Zalando) joined BESTSECRET as a Co-CEO of the company.

== Logistics Locations ==
BESTSECRET warehouse moved to a new central warehouse in Poing near Munich in 2015. The size of the facility is 28,800 square metres and has a capacity of up to 4 million items of clothing.

== Development Locations ==
BESTSECRET development centres are located in Granada and Munich.

== Cargo Container Hardwood Beetle Incident ==
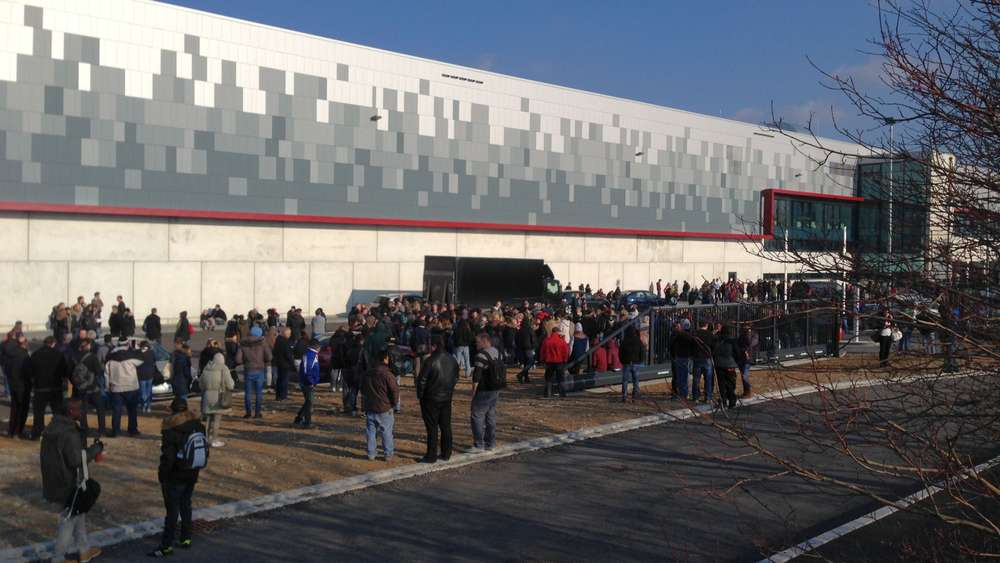
Evacuation process as two containers from Asia when contaminants were being sprayed against the longhorned beetle.

In 2016, there was one incident in which nine employees were injured and another 51 had to seek medical treatment. The cause was traced back to two containers from China, which were provided with means that were intended to prevent the import of Asian longhorn beetle. Employees complained of airborne contaminants that caused irritation to the eyes and respiratory tract. The product in question was returned. The warehouse was put back into service the following day. Daniel Schustermann promised to introduce stricter security measures in the future to protect employees.

== Awards ==
2nd Place for Shopping Club in Online Retail – Test Bild Beste Service-Qualität 2017/18
