= Louise Ringsing =

Danish footballer (born 1996)

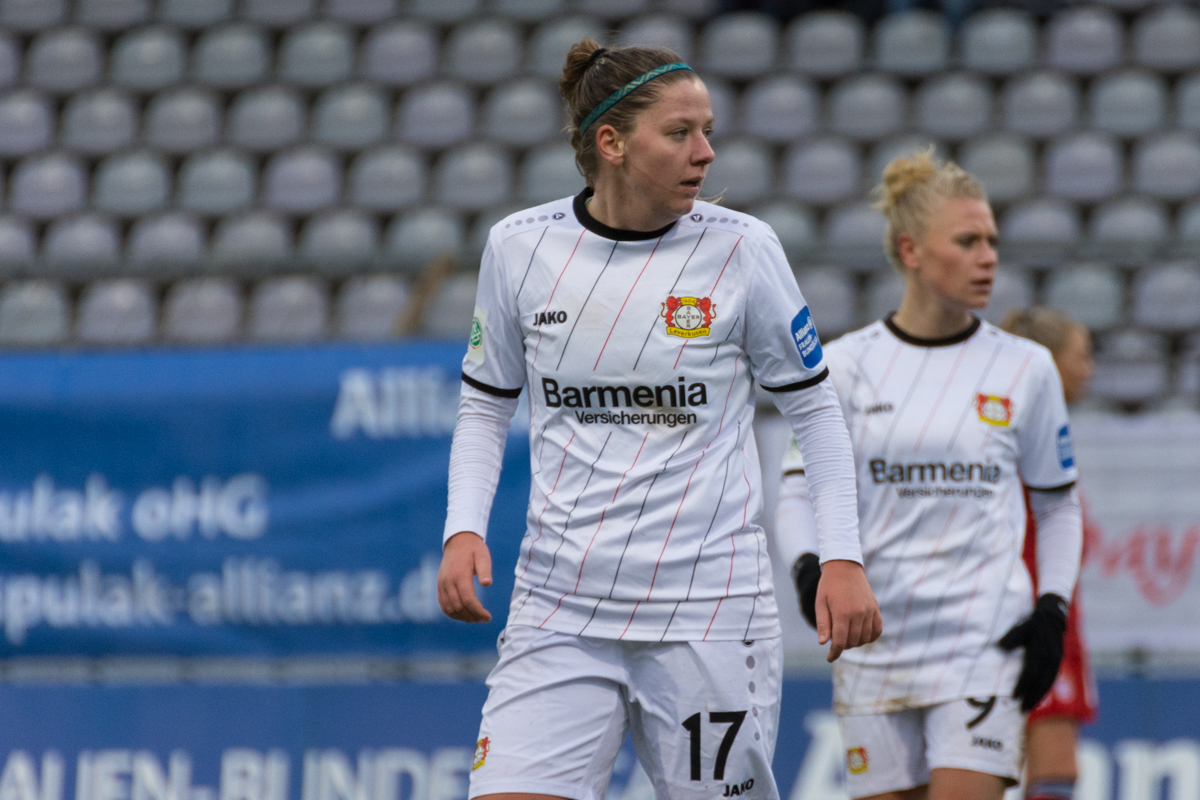
- Ringsing in 2018

Personal information
- Full name: Louise Ringsing
- Date of birth: 20 August 1996 (age 30)
- Place of birth: Karise, Denmark
- Height: 1.76 m (5 ft 9 in)
- Position: Midfielder

Team information
- Current team: B.93
- Number: 27

Youth career
- 2000–2003: Karise IK
- 2003–2006: Strøby AIK
- 2006–2007: Haslev FC
- 2007–2010: Solrød FC
- 2010–2011: Brøndby
- 2011–2013: Turbine Potsdam

Senior career*
Years	Team	Apps	(Gls)
2013–2016	Brøndby		
2016–2017	Fortuna Hjørring	20	(2)
2018–2019	Bayer 04 Leverkusen	29	(2)
2019–2020	Brøndby	14	(0)
2020–2023	RB Leipzig	57	(12)
2023–2026	Næstved HG	16	(3)
2026–	B.93		

International career
2011–2012	Denmark U16	10	(0)
2011–2013	Denmark U17	13	(0)
2013–2015	Denmark U19	23	(1)
2015–2017	Denmark U23	3	(0)

Managerial career
- 2023–2026: Næstved HG
- * Club domestic league appearances and goals as of 23 March 2024

Louise Ringsing (born 20 August 1996) is a Danish football defender and coach who plays for B-Liga club B.93. Ringsing has represented Denmark at youth level, and has also appeared for the Denmark women's national under-23 team. She has previously played for German Frauen-Bundesliga club Bayer 04 Leverkusen and then-2. Frauen-Bundesliga club RB Leipzig, and Danish A-Liga clubs Brøndby and Fortuna Hjørring, as well as B-Liga side Næstved HG.

== Club career ==
She started playing for Brøndby IF and Turbine Potsdam in her youth years. After two years in Germany, she went back to Brøndby IF until 2016 and then signed with Fortuna Hjørring. In 2018, she joined Bayer 04 Leverkusen, where she played in one year, until she came back to Denmark for Brøndby IF. In the summer of 2020 she signed with RB Leipzig, where she stayed for three years. After winning the championship in the second German women's division, she returned to Denmark once again, where she joined Næstved Boldklub. She also coaches the team together with her father Arne. Ringsing got her UEFA A coaching license in January 2025.

== Personal life ==
Outside of football, Ringsing has studied to become a teacher in 2025 she is a teacher for a school "sct. Jørgens school".

== Honours ==
RB Leipzig

- 2. Frauen-Bundesliga: 2022–23
