= Ramona Maier =

Ramona Maier may refer to:

- Ramona Farcău, formerly Maier, (born 1979), Romanian retired handballer
- Ramona Maier (footballer) (born 1995), German footballer
