= Carla Schwarz =

German footballer (born 2006)

Personal information
- Full name: Carla Schwarz
- Date of birth: 26 June 2006 (age 20)
- Place of birth: Germany
- Position: Midfielder

Youth career
- 2018–2020: FC Ingolstadt 04 (women)
- 2020–2023: Bayern Munich (women)

Senior career*
Years	Team	Apps	(Gls)
2022–	Bayern Munich II (women)	24	(4)
- * Club domestic league appearances and goals as of 00:50, 22 December 2023 (UTC)

Carla Schwarz is a German footballer who currently plays as a midfielder for Bayern Munich II (women) in the 2. Frauen-Bundesliga.

== Career ==
Schwarz cam up through the youth system of Bayern Munich (women). Her first season with Bayern Munich II (women) was the 2022–23 season where she scored one goal in 14 appearances.

== Career statistics ==
As of match played 17 December 2023

Appearances and goals by club, season and competition
Club	Season	League		
Club	Season	Division	Apps	Goals
Bayern Munich II	2022–23	2. Frauen-Bundesliga	14	1
Bayern Munich II	2023–24	2. Frauen-Bundesliga	10	3
Bayern Munich II	Totals		24	4
Career Totals			24	4
