= Elvira Herzog =

Swiss footballer (born 2000)

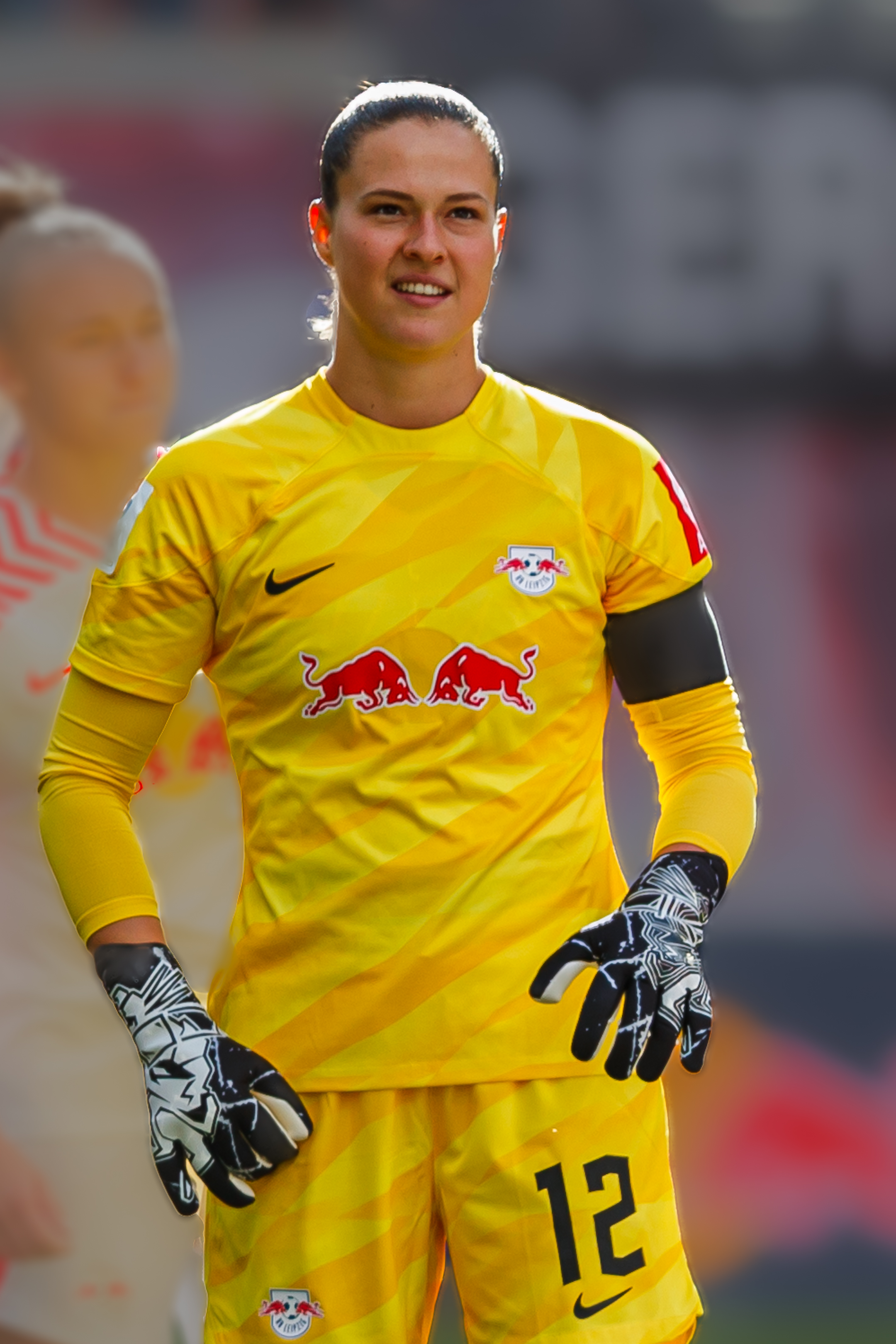
- Herzog with RB Leipzig in 2023

Personal information
- Full name: Elvira Johanna Herzog
- Date of birth: 5 March 2000 (age 26)
- Place of birth: Zürich, Switzerland
- Height: 1.79 m (5 ft 10 in)
- Position: Goalkeeper

Team information
- Current team: RB Leipzig
- Number: 1

Youth career
- 2009–2011: FC Unterstrass
- 2011–2016: FC Zürich

Senior career*
Years	Team	Apps	(Gls)
2016–2019	FC Zürich	25	(0)
2019–2020	FC Köln	18	(0)
2020–2021	SC Freiburg	6	(0)
2021–2022	FC Köln	1	(0)
2022–	RB Leipzig	93	(0)

International career^{‡}
2015–2016	Switzerland U17	8	(0)
2017–2019	Switzerland U19	8	(0)
2019–	Switzerland	23	(0)
- * Club domestic league appearances and goals as of 21:58, 8 October 2026 (UTC) ‡ National team caps and goals as of 21:58, 8 October 2026 (UTC)

Elvira Johanna Herzog (born 5 March 2000) is a Swiss professional footballer who plays as a goalkeeper for Frauen-Bundesliga club RB Leipzig and the Switzerland national team.

== Club career ==
Herzog started her career in autumn 2009 at FC Unterstrass, and joined FC Zürich Letzikids in 2011 at the age of 11, before moving up to the first team in 2016. She made her Zürich debut against Yverdon Féminin on 2 December 2017 and kept a clean sheet. On 9 July 2019, Herzog moved to Germany to join 1. FC Köln. After 1. FC Köln were relegated from the Bundesliga, she moved to SC Freiburg for the 2020–21 season. After the resurgence of 1. FC Köln in the Bundesliga, she moved to 2021–22 season back to her old club, were played in one league game.

Ahead of the 2022–23 season, Herzog switched to RB Leipzig in the 2. Bundesliga. In a title-winning year, the Swiss goalie played in 18 of the 26 matches, taking seven clean sheets. For the following season, Leipzig signed new goalkeeping coach Michael Gurski to further develop Herzog and teammates Gina Schüller and Eve Boettcher. Despite a challenging first half of the 2023–24 Bundesliga campaign that included just one clean sheet against Nürnberg, Herzog signed a contract extension until 2027.

== International career ==
After eleven games for the U-17 and 16 games for the U-19 of Switzerland, she was called up to the senior national team for the first time on 4 June 2019. She made her debut for the Switzerland national team on 14 June 2019 against Serbia, coming on as a substitute for Nadja Furrer. Her first competitive fixture came in a Euro qualifying fixture versus Belgium, where she made errors that led to two goals after crosses, in a game Switzerland lost 4–0. Herzog missed out on the 2022 Euros and was only placed on the reserve list for the 2023 World Cup. Having developed positively in previous seasons and proven her worth during appearances in 2024 — including saving a penalty against Sweden — Herzog became the Swiss starting goalkeeper in 2024. However, following a strong season by Livia Peng, it was announced days before the 2025 Euros in Switzerland that Herzog would be relegated to second choice by manager Pia Sundhage.

On 23 June 2025, Herzog was called up to the Switzerland squad for the UEFA Women's Euro 2025.

== Career statistics ==
=== International ===
As of match played 9 June 2026

Appearances and goals by national team and year
National team	Year	Apps	Goals
Switzerland
Switzerland	2019	1	0
Switzerland	2020	2	0
Switzerland	2021	0	0
Switzerland	2022	0	0
Switzerland	2023	4	0
Switzerland	2024	10	0
Switzerland	2025	5	0
Switzerland	2026	1	0
Total		23	0

== Honours ==
Zürich

- Swiss Championship: 2017–18, 2018–19
- Swiss Cup: 2017–18, 2018–19

RB Leipzig

- 2. Frauen-Bundesliga: 2022–23
