= Borussia Dortmund (women) =

- Founded: October 2020; 6 years ago
- Ground: Stadion Rote Erde, Dortmund
- Capacity: 10,000
- President: Reinhold Lunow
- CEO: Lars Ricken
- Head coach: Markus Högner
- League: Regionalliga West
- 2025–26: Regionalliga West, 2nd
Home colours	Away colours	Third colours

Borussia Dortmund is a German women's association football team based in Dortmund, North Rhine-Westphalia.

The club achieved back-to-back promotions, going unbeaten in their first three seasons, ultimately reaching the Regionalliga and winning the Kreispokal four times in a row.

== History ==
Borussia Dortmund's women's football department was announced in September 2020. The first team debuted in the 2021–22 season of Kreisliga (7th division) under coach Thomas Sulewski, with former professional players such as Christian Timm and Annike Krahn as advisors. On 8 August 2021, Stadion Rote Erde hosted the first match of the women's team, in which they won 3–1 against TSV 1860 Munich. In 2023–24, they achieved promotion to the fourth-tier Westfalenliga.

On 27 April 2025, a record attendance of 10,000 spectators witnessed the women's team victory 2–1 against their rivals FC Schalke 04 in the Stadion Rote Erde. A month later, on 11 May, they secured promotion to the Regionalliga (3rd division) by finishing in first place after a dominant 7–0 victory over SV Fortuna Freudenberg.

On 1 June 2025, Borussia Dortmund defeated FC Schalke 2–0 in the Westfalenpokal final in front of 10,000 spectators in the Stadion Rote Erde. This qualified Borussia Dortmund for the first time to the playoffs of the 2025–26 DFB-Pokal Frauen. In their first DFB-Pokal participation, they secured a 3–1 win over Borussia Mönchengladbach in the playoffs. However, they were eliminated in the next round, following a 2–0 defeat to reigning champions Bayern Munich. In the 2025–26 season, the club finished second in the Regionalliga West, two points behind 1. FC Köln II, narrowly missing out on promotion. During the season, the club defeated Deutz 05 3–0 on the field; however, the result was later overturned and awarded to Deutz 05 after the club was found to have fielded Sara Ito, who was deemed an ineligible substitute.

== Statistics ==
Seasons highlighted in green indicate a promotion; '–' means 'not qualified'.

Season	Division	League	Place	W	D	L	Goals	Points	DFB-Pokal	Westfalenpokal	Kreispokal
2021–22	7	Kreisliga A Dortmund Gruppe 2	1.	18	0	0	143–3	54	–	–	Winner
2021–22	7	Promotion Game KL A DO – Winner Gruppe 1 vs. 2	1.	1	0	0	4–0	3			
2022–23	6	Bezirksliga Staffel 4	1.	24	0	0	143–5	72	–	Quarterfinal	Winner
2023–24	5	Landesliga Staffel 2	1.	23	1	0	124–6	70	–	Semifinal	Winner
2024–25	4	Verbandsliga Westfalen/Westfalenliga	1.	24	1	1	115–15	73	–	Winner	Winner
2025–26	3	Regionalliga West	2.	21	3	2	114–13	66	First Round	Second Round	–
2026–27	3	Regionalliga West	1.	11	0	0	53–0	33	–	Qualified	–

== Squad ==
As of 1 July 2026

Note: Flags indicate national team as defined under FIFA eligibility rules; some limited exceptions apply. Players may hold more than one non-FIFA nationality.

No.	Pos.	Nation	Player
1	GK	GER	Laura van der Laan
2	DF	GER	Yasu Wöhrn
3	DF	SUR	Jenske Steenwijk
6	MF	GER	Ricarda Walkling
7	FW	GER	Ramona Maier
8	MF	GER	Noreen Günnewig
9	FW	GER	Dana Marquardt
10	FW	GER	Rita Schumacher
11	FW	GER	Alexandra Popp
13	DF	GER	Paula Reimann
14	MF	JPN	Sara Ito
15	MF	GER	Marina Scholz
16	DF	GER	Jacqueline Meißner

No.	Pos.	Nation	Player
17	MF	GER	Ronja Leubner
18	DF	GER	Lena Ostermeier
19	FW	GER	Annika Enderle
20	DF	GER	Ann-Sophie Vogel
21	DF	GER	Frederike Kempe
22	DF	GER	Melanie Schuster
23	GK	GER	Caroline Blum
24	GK	AUT	Manuela Zinsberger
25	DF	GER	Lara Schmidt
29	FW	GER	Emilia Pauls
31	GK	GER	Deniese Lichatschow
32	MF	GER	Mia Scholle

== Former Players ==
- (Singapore) Danelle Tan

== Current staff ==
As of 1 July 2026

Coaching staff
(Germany) Markus Högner	Head coach
(Germany) Tim Treude (Germany) Erfan Esmaily	Assistant coach
(Germany) Josephine Plehn	Goalkeeping coach
(Germany) Marcel Merkel	Team manager
(Germany) Luisa Schulz	Physiotherapist
(Germany) Benedikt Terschluse	Training scientist
