= Amelie Roduner =

Swiss–Austrian footballer (born 2005)

Personal information
- Full name: Amelie Roduner
- Date of birth: 9 March 2005 (age 21)
- Place of birth: Switzerland
- Position: Forward

Team information
- Current team: Bayern Munich II (women)

Youth career
- –2022: Bayern Munich (women)

Senior career*
Years	Team	Apps	(Gls)
2021–	Bayern Munich II (women)	32	(5)
- * Club domestic league appearances and goals as of 21:18, 5 September 2023 (UTC)

Amelie Roduner is a Swiss–Austrian footballer who plays as a forward for Bayern Munich II (women).

== Career ==
Roduner came up through the youth system if Bayern Munich. She came up to play for Bayern Munich II during the 2021–22 season where she scored three goals in 12 appearances.

== Career statistics ==
As of match played 29 May 2023

Appearances and goals by club, season and competition
Club	Season	League		
Club	Season	Division	Apps	Goals
Bayern Munich II	2021–22	2. Frauen-Bundesliga	12	3
Bayern Munich II	2022–23	2. Frauen-Bundesliga	20	2
Bayern Munich II	2023–24	2. Frauen-Bundesliga	0	0
Bayern Munich II	Total		32	5
Career Total			32	5
