= Karise =

- Town
- Karise Church in Karise

- Location in Denmark Karise (Denmark Region Zealand)
- Coordinates: 55°18′25″N 12°11′52″E
- Country: Denmark
- Region: Zealand (Sjælland)
- Municipality: Faxe

Area
  - Urban: 1.3 km^{2} (0.50 sq mi)

Population (2026)
  - Urban: 2,431
  - Urban density: 1,900/km^{2} (4,800/sq mi)
- Time zone: UTC+1 (CET)
  - Summer (DST): UTC+2 (CEST)
- Postal code: DK-4653 Karise

Karise is the main town of Karise Parish in Faxe Municipality, Region Sjælland ("Zealand Region") in the southeast of Denmark. Karise town has a population of 2,431 (1 January 2026) (Karise Parish: 2,903 (2026))

Karise is mentioned in 1261, when Peder Olufsen, a local Lord, in his will donated 12 marks to the consecration of Karise Church.

Until the municipal reform of 1972, Karise was part of its own Karise Municipality.

== Karise Church ==
The church is built as a fortified church which served as a place of refuge during wendish incursions in the 13th century. At that time the stream on the east side of the church was a navigable fjord, rendering the surrounding villages an easy target for the wendish pirates. The architecture of the church displays both romanesque and gothic style features. The windows in the apse are romanesque round arches while the windows in the nave are gothic pointed arches.

The double function of the church as both of a fortress and a church can be seen in the unusual design of having two church towers. One of the towers has later been lowered to give the church a more classic Danish church look. The larger tower also still have archer holes.

The yellow and grey memorial chapel on the southern side of the church was built in 1766-1769 by Count A. G. Moltke and designed by C. F. Harsdorff. The neo-classical style of the chapel contrasts the medieval brickwork of the church.

== The Town ==
The original village was situated northwest of the church. A large part of the village was consumed in a great fire in 1804 and never rebuilt since the village was undergoing enclosure. Modern day Karise is centered on the railway station which was built in 1879. The railway connects Karise with neighbouring towns Faxe and Hårlev as well as Køge and Copenhagen.

== Karise in fiction ==
According to the legend of Mrs. Marthe, her estate Karisegård was destroyed by wendish pirates. Mrs. Marthe fled to a small chamber above the apse of Karise Church and remained there until her property was reconstructed.

Poet and novelist B. S. Ingemann mentions the fictive person Karl of Riise in his historic novel Valdemar the Victorius (Danish: Valdemar Seier). Karl of Riise was a squire of archbishop Anders Sunesen during the Northern Crusades against the Estonians. In the Battle of Lindanise in 1219, Karl af Rise is mentioned as being the person who caught the Danish flag, Dannebrog, when it fell from the sky.

Karise is mentioned in a few folk songs. Most famous are "Lille fregnede Louise (fra Karise)" and "Slikkehans". Karise is also mentioned in the comedy song "Syd for Køge" by Monrad & Rislund.

The title of the Danish national play Elves' Hill (Danish: Elverhøj) refers to a small mound situated 2.5 kilometers northeast of Karise.

== Notable people ==
- Louise Ringsing (born 1996 in Karise) a footballer who plays for Brøndby IF and for the Denmark women's national under-23 team
