= Lara Marti =

Swiss footballer (born 1999)

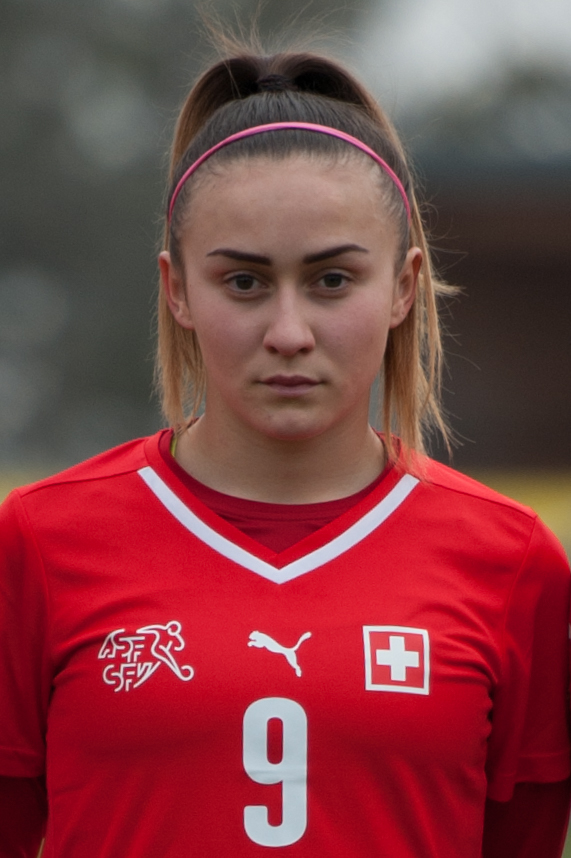
- Marti in 2016

Personal information
- Full name: Lara Katinka Marti
- Date of birth: 21 September 1999 (age 27)
- Place of birth: Basel, Switzerland
- Height: 1.62 m (5 ft 4 in)
- Position: Midfielder

Team information
- Current team: RB Leipzig
- Number: 30

Youth career
- FC Lausen 72
- FC Liestal
- Basel

Senior career*
Years	Team	Apps	(Gls)
2016–2020	Basel	61	(13)
2020–2024	Bayer Leverkusen	47	(1)
2024–	RB Leipzig	24	(0)

International career^{‡}
2016	Switzerland U17	5	(1)
2017–2018	Switzerland U19	12	(0)
2019–	Switzerland	18	(0)
- * Club domestic league appearances and goals as of 11 May 2025 ‡ National team caps and goals as of 25 February 2025

Lara Katinka Marti (born 21 September 1999) is a Swiss professional footballer who plays as a midfielder for Frauen Bundesliga club RB Leipzig and the Switzerland national team.

== Club career ==
Marti started playing football in 2008 at FC Lausen 72 and switched to the youth department of FC Basel via FC Liestal in 2014. After initially being part of the under-19 squad there, she made her debut in the Nationalliga in February 2016 at the age of 16. In the following four seasons, she made a total of 62 league appearances for her team, scoring nine goals.

For the 2020/21 season, Marti moved to German Bundesliga club Bayer 04 Leverkusen, where she signed a two-year contract. She made her Bundesliga debut on 4 October 2020 against VfL Wolfsburg.

== International career ==
Marti has represented Switzerland at various youth levels. She was part of the under-19 team at the 2018 UEFA Women's Under-19 Championship, where she made three appearances. She made her debut for the Switzerland national team on 14 June 2019 against Serbia, starting the match.

== Career statistics ==
=== International ===
As of match played 25 February 2025

Appearances and goals by national team and year
National team	Year	Apps	Goals
Switzerland	2019	1	0
Switzerland	2020	1	0
Switzerland	2021	6	0
Switzerland	2022	3	0
Switzerland	2023	4	0
Switzerland	2024	2	0
Switzerland	2025	1	0
Total		18	0
