= 2023–24 Frauen-Bundesliga =

Frauen-Bundesliga
- Season: 2023–24
- Dates: 15 September 2023 – 20 May 2024
- Champions: Bayern Munich
- Relegated: 1. FC Nürnberg; MSV Duisburg
- Champions League: Bayern Munich; VfL Wolfsburg; Eintracht Frankfurt
- Matches: 132
- Goals: 422 (3.2 per match)
- Top goalscorer: Ewa Pajor (18 goals)
- Biggest home win: Hoffenheim 9–0 Duisburg
- Biggest away win: Nürnberg 1–9 Wolfsburg
- Highest scoring: Nürnberg 1–9 Wolfsburg
- Longest winning run: 10 games Munich
- Longest unbeaten run: 22 games Munich
- Longest winless run: 22 games Duisburg
- Longest losing run: 5 games Duisburg
- Attendance: 379,686 (2,876 per match)

The 2023–24 season of the Frauen-Bundesliga was the 34th season of Germany's premier women's football league. It ran from 15 September 2023 to 20 May 2024.

The fixtures were announced on 14 July 2023.

== Teams ==
Locations of teams in the 2023–24 Frauen-Bundesliga

=== Team changes ===
| Promoted from 2022–23 2. Bundesliga | Relegated from 2022–23 Bundesliga |
|---|---|
| RB Leipzig; 1. FC Nürnberg | SV Meppen; Turbine Potsdam |

=== Stadiums ===
| Team | Home city | Home ground | Capacity |
|---|---|---|---|
| Werder Bremen | Bremen | Weserstadion Platz 11 | 5,500 |
| MSV Duisburg | Duisburg | PCC-Stadion | 3,000 |
| SGS Essen | Essen | Stadion Essen | 20,650 |
| Eintracht Frankfurt | Frankfurt | Stadion am Brentanobad | 5,650 |
| SC Freiburg | Freiburg | Dreisamstadion | 24,000 |
| TSG Hoffenheim | Hoffenheim | Dietmar-Hopp-Stadion | 6,350 |
| 1. FC Köln | Cologne | Franz-Kremer-Stadion | 5,457 |
| RB Leipzig | Leipzig | Sportanlage Gontardweg | 1,300 |
| Bayer Leverkusen | Leverkusen | Ulrich-Haberland-Stadion | 3,200 |
| Bayern Munich | Munich | FC Bayern Campus | 2,500 |
| 1. FC Nürnberg | Nuremberg | Max-Morlock-Stadion | 50,000 |
| VfL Wolfsburg | Wolfsburg | AOK Stadium | 5,200 |

=== Personnel and kits ===
| Team | Manager | Captain | Kit manufacturer | Shirt sponsors (front) | Shirt sponsors (back) | Shirt sponsors (sleeve) |
|---|---|---|---|---|---|---|
| Werder Bremen | (Germany) Thomas Horsch | (Germany) Lina Hausicke | Hummel | Ammerländer | ELEMENTS Ausstellungen | CONTACT Software |
| MSV Duisburg | (Germany) Thomas Gerstner | (Germany) Yvonne Zielinski | Capelli | 28 BLACK | None | Kununu |
| SGS Essen | (Germany) Markus Högner | (Germany) Jacqueline Meißner | Puma | Die Wohnkompanie | Visit Essen | ifm |
| Eintracht Frankfurt | (Germany) Niko Arnautis | (Poland) Tanja Pawollek | Nike | Indeed | None | Elotrans reload |
| SC Freiburg | (Germany) Theresa Merk | (Germany) Hasret Kayikçi | Nike | Badenova | None | JobRad |
| TSG Hoffenheim | (Germany) Stephan Lerch | (Germany) Fabienne Dongus | Joma | syNeo | None | Union Investment |
| 1. FC Köln | (Germany) Daniel Weber | (Israel) Sharon Beck | Hummel | Deutsche Telekom | Schaebens | SAP |
| RB Leipzig | (Germany) Şaban Uzun | (Germany) Victoria Krug | Nike | Red Bull | None | AOC Die Stadtentwickler |
| Bayer Leverkusen | (Netherlands) Robert de Pauw | (Germany) Elisa Senß | Castore | Barmenia | Früh | s2-Software |
| Bayern Munich | (Norway) Alexander Straus | (Iceland) Glódís Perla Viggósdóttir | Adidas | Allianz | None | Deutsche Telekom |
| 1. FC Nürnberg | (Netherlands) Thomas Oostendorp | (Germany) Lea Paulick | Adidas | Nürnberger Versicherung | Autohaus Kummich | Edeka App |
| VfL Wolfsburg | (Germany) Tommy Stroot | (Germany) Alexandra Popp | Nike | Volkswagen | None | Dermaroller |

== League table ==
| Pos | Team | Pld | W | D | L | GF | GA | GD | Pts | Qualification or relegation |
|---|---|---|---|---|---|---|---|---|---|---|
| 1 | Bayern Munich (C) | 22 | 19 | 3 | 0 | 60 | 8 | +52 | 60 | Qualification for Champions League group stage |
| 2 | VfL Wolfsburg | 22 | 17 | 2 | 3 | 67 | 19 | +48 | 53 | Qualification for Champions League second round |
| 3 | Eintracht Frankfurt | 22 | 14 | 2 | 6 | 42 | 25 | +17 | 44 | Qualification for Champions League first round |
| 4 | SGS Essen | 22 | 10 | 5 | 7 | 33 | 26 | +7 | 35 | |
| 5 | TSG Hoffenheim | 22 | 10 | 4 | 8 | 43 | 35 | +8 | 34 | |
| 6 | Bayer Leverkusen | 22 | 8 | 7 | 7 | 34 | 25 | +9 | 31 | |
| 7 | Werder Bremen | 22 | 8 | 4 | 10 | 34 | 31 | +3 | 28 | |
| 8 | RB Leipzig | 22 | 7 | 5 | 10 | 26 | 41 | −15 | 26 | |
| 9 | SC Freiburg | 22 | 6 | 6 | 10 | 26 | 44 | −18 | 24 | |
| 10 | 1. FC Köln | 22 | 5 | 3 | 14 | 25 | 43 | −18 | 18 | |
| 11 | 1. FC Nürnberg (R) | 22 | 4 | 3 | 15 | 16 | 61 | −45 | 15 | Relegation to 2. Bundesliga |
| 12 | MSV Duisburg (R) | 22 | 0 | 4 | 18 | 16 | 64 | −48 | 4 | Demotion to Regionalliga |

Source: DFB
Rules for classification: 1) Points; 2) Goal difference; 3) Goals scored; 4) Head-to-head results; 5) Head-to-head away goals scored; 6) Away goals scored; 7) Play-off.
(C) Champions; (R) Relegated

== Results ==
| Home \ Away | BRE | DUI | ESS | FRA | FRE | HOF | KÖL | LEI | LEV | MUN | NÜR | WOL |
|---|---|---|---|---|---|---|---|---|---|---|---|---|
| Werder Bremen | — | 4–2 | 0–0 | 0–1 | 0–3 | 1–3 | 3–0 | 1–1 | 2–1 | 0–2 | 4–0 | 0–3 |
| MSV Duisburg | 0–2 | — | 0–1 | 1–2 | 2–2 | 0–2 | 0–0 | 1–1 | 1–3 | 1–5 | 1–2 | 1–4 |
| SGS Essen | 1–1 | 4–1 | — | 2–0 | 0–1 | 2–1 | 2–1 | 4–4 | 0–0 | 0–2 | 5–0 | 1–3 |
| Eintracht Frankfurt | 2–0 | 5–1 | 1–0 | — | 4–2 | 3–1 | 1–0 | 3–1 | 2–2 | 1–2 | 4–1 | 2–4 |
| SC Freiburg | 2–1 | 1–1 | 0–1 | 0–4 | — | 2–4 | 3–3 | 2–1 | 0–0 | 2–2 | 0–2 | 1–4 |
| TSG Hoffenheim | 1–1 | 9–0 | 0–3 | 1–3 | 2–3 | — | 1–1 | 2–1 | 2–2 | 1–4 | 2–0 | 2–1 |
| 1. FC Köln | 2–1 | 4–1 | 0–1 | 0–1 | 2–0 | 1–2 | — | 2–1 | 0–1 | 0–5 | 3–4 | 1–4 |
| RB Leipzig | 0–5 | 3–0 | 3–2 | 2–1 | 0–2 | 3–0 | 2–1 | — | 1–0 | 0–3 | 0–0 | 0–2 |
| Bayer Leverkusen | 2–3 | 4–1 | 0–0 | 2–0 | 3–0 | 1–2 | 2–0 | 1–1 | — | 1–2 | 6–0 | 1–1 |
| Bayern Munich | 3–0 | 2–0 | 2–0 | 0–0 | 4–0 | 1–0 | 2–0 | 5–0 | 3–0 | — | 4–0 | 2–1 |
| 1. FC Nürnberg | 1–5 | 2–1 | 0–4 | 0–2 | 0–0 | 0–3 | 1–3 | 0–1 | 1–2 | 1–1 | — | 1–9 |
| VfL Wolfsburg | 1–0 | 2–0 | 6–0 | 3–0 | 4–0 | 2–2 | 5–1 | 4–0 | 3–0 | 0–4 | 1–0 | — |

Source: DFB
Legend: Blue = home team win; Yellow = draw; Red = away team win.

== Statistics ==
=== Top scorers ===
| Rank | Player | Club | Goals |
|---|---|---|---|
| 1 | (Poland) Ewa Pajor | VfL Wolfsburg | 18 |
| 2 | (Germany) Nicole Anyomi | Eintracht Frankfurt | 11 |
| 2 | (Germany) Lea Schüller | Bayern Munich | 11 |
| 4 | (Germany) Vanessa Fudalla | RB Leipzig | 10 |
| 4 | (Poland) Nikola Karczewska | Bayer Leverkusen | 10 |
| 6 | (Germany) Vivien Endemann | VfL Wolfsburg | 9 |
| 6 | (Germany) Laura Freigang | Eintracht Frankfurt | 9 |
| 6 | (Denmark) Pernille Harder | Bayern Munich | 9 |
| 9 | (Serbia) Jovana Damnjanović | Bayern Munich | 8 |
| 9 | (Germany) Sophie Weidauer | Werder Bremen | 8 |

=== Hat-tricks ===
| Player | Club | Against | Result | Date |
|---|---|---|---|---|
| (Germany) Melissa Kössler | TSG Hoffenheim | MSV Duisburg | 9–0 (H) | 16 September 2023 |
| (Poland) Nikola Karczewska | Bayer Leverkusen | 1. FC Nürnberg | 6–0 (H) | 30 September 2023 |
| (Germany) Sophie Weidauer | Werder Bremen | RB Leipzig | 5–0 (A) | 11 November 2023 |
| (Poland) Ewa Pajor^{4} | VfL Wolfsburg | 1. FC Nürnberg | 9–1 (A) | 17 February 2024 |
| (Denmark) Pernille Harder | Bayern Munich | 1. FC Nürnberg | 4–0 (H) | 12 May 2024 |
| (Poland) Ewa Pajor | VfL Wolfsburg | SGS Essen | 6–0 (H) | 20 May 2024 |

^{4} Player scored four goals.

=== Clean sheets ===
| Rank | Player | Club | Clean sheets |
|---|---|---|---|
| 1 | (Germany) Maria Luisa Grohs | Bayern Munich | 14 |
| 2 | (Germany) Sophia Winkler | SGS Essen | 10 |
| 3 | (Germany) Merle Frohms | VfL Wolfsburg | 9 |
| 4 | (Germany) Friederike Repohl | Bayer Leverkusen | 8 |
| 5 | (Germany) Stina Johannes | Eintracht Frankfurt | 7 |
| 6 | (Germany) Rafaela Borggräfe | SC Freiburg | 5 |
| 6 | (Switzerland) Elvira Herzog | RB Leipzig | 5 |
| 6 | (Switzerland) Livia Peng | Werder Bremen | 5 |
| 9 | (Germany) Martina Tufekovic | TSG Hoffenheim | 4 |
| 10 | (Austria) Kristin Krammer | 1. FC Nürnberg | 2 |

== Attendances ==
| # | Football club | Average attendance |
|---|---|---|
| 1 | VfL Wolfsburg | 5,691 |
| 2 | 1. FC Köln | 4,914 |
| 3 | Bayern München | 3,964 |
| 4 | Eintracht Frankfurt | 3,736 |
| 5 | SC Freiburg | 3,571 |
| 6 | Werder Bremen | 3,361 |
| 7 | SGS Essen | 2,134 |
| 8 | RB Leipzig | 2,011 |
| 9 | 1. FC Nürnberg | 1,819 |
| 10 | 1899 Hoffenheim | 1,315 |
| 11 | Bayer Leverkusen | 1,010 |
| 12 | MSV Duisburg | 991 |

== See also ==
- 2023–24 DFB-Pokal Frauen
