= Jenske Steenwijk =

Dutch footballer (born 2004)

Personal information
- Date of birth: 8 November 2004 (age 22)
- Place of birth: Netherlands
- Height: 1.65 m (5 ft 5 in)
- Position: Defender

Team information
- Current team: Borussia Dortmund
- Number: 3

Youth career
- –2018: VV Emmen
- 2018–2021: SV Meppen

Senior career*
Years	Team	Apps	(Gls)
2021–2025	SV Meppen	59	(0)
2021–2024	SV Meppen II	5	(0)
2025–	Borussia Dortmund	32	(8)
- * Club domestic league appearances and goals as of 20 November 2026

Jenske Steenwijk (born 8 November 2004) is a Dutch footballer who plays as a defender for the German club Borussia Dortmund.

== Career ==
Steenwijk began her senior career with German side SV Meppen. In June 2025, she joined Borussia Dortmund.
