= Victoria Krug =

German footballer (born 1998)

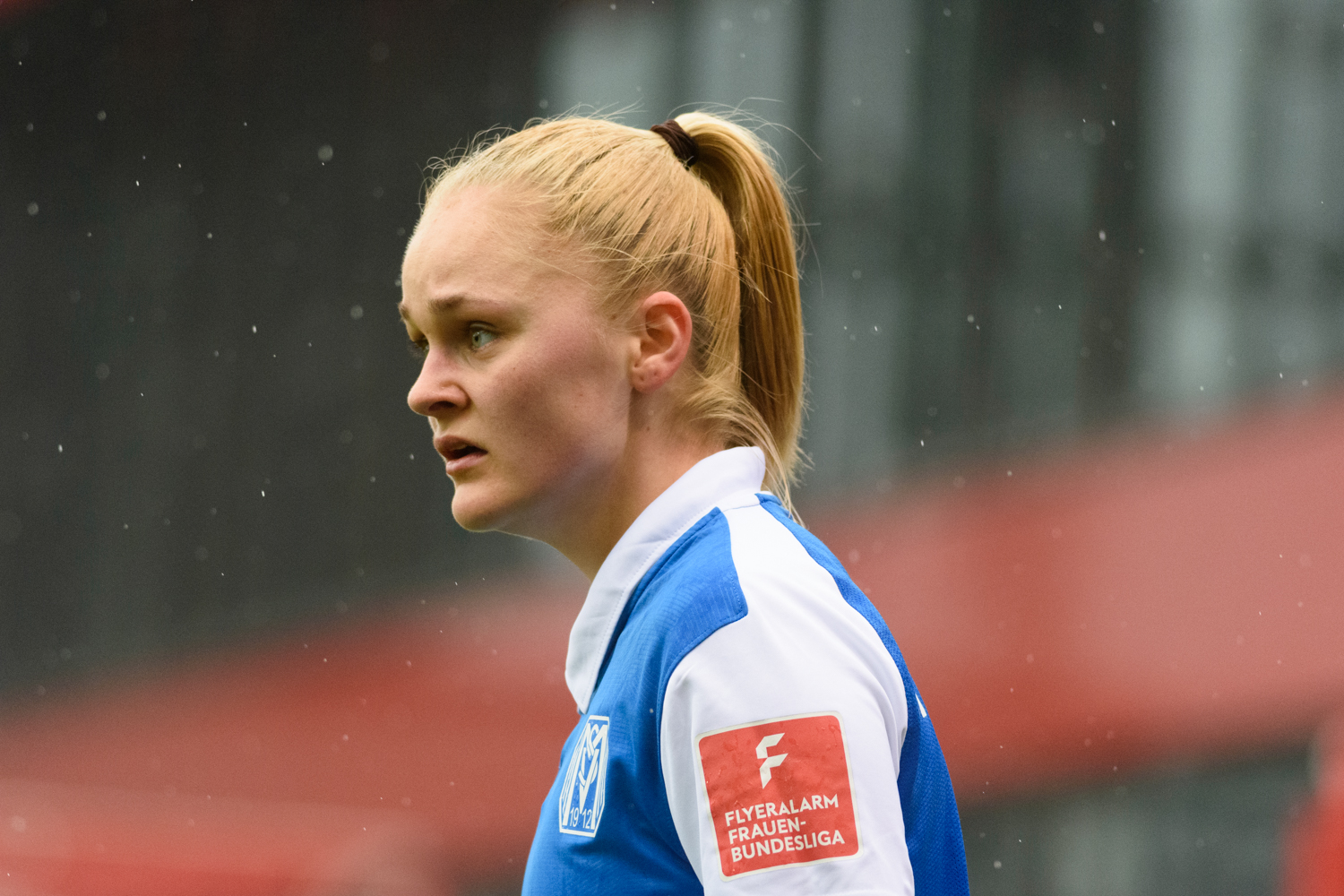
- Krug in 2021

Personal information
- Full name: Victoria Krug
- Date of birth: 12 January 1998 (age 28)
- Place of birth: Forst, Germany
- Height: 1.68 m (5 ft 6 in)
- Position: Defender

Team information
- Current team: Nantes
- Number: 13

Senior career*
Years	Team	Apps	(Gls)
2014–2017	1. FFC Turbine Potsdam II	29	(1)
2014–2017	1. FFC Turbine Potsdam	11	(0)
2020–2021	SV Meppen	20	(0)
2021–2026	RB Leipzig	103	(4)
2026–	Nantes	4	(0)

International career
2013–2014	Germany U16	7	(0)
2014–2015	Germany U17	13	(1)
2015	Germany U19	1	(0)
- * Club domestic league appearances and goals as of 16:53, 9 October 2026 (UTC)

Victoria Krug (born 12 January 1998) is a German professional footballer who plays as a defender for Première Ligue club Nantes. Krug became the first female footballer from Lusatia to play in the Frauen-Bundesliga.

== Honours ==
RB Leipzig

- 2. Frauen-Bundesliga: 2022–23
