= Sportpark Aschheim =

Football stadium in Germany

Coordinates: 48°09′43″N 11°43′25″E

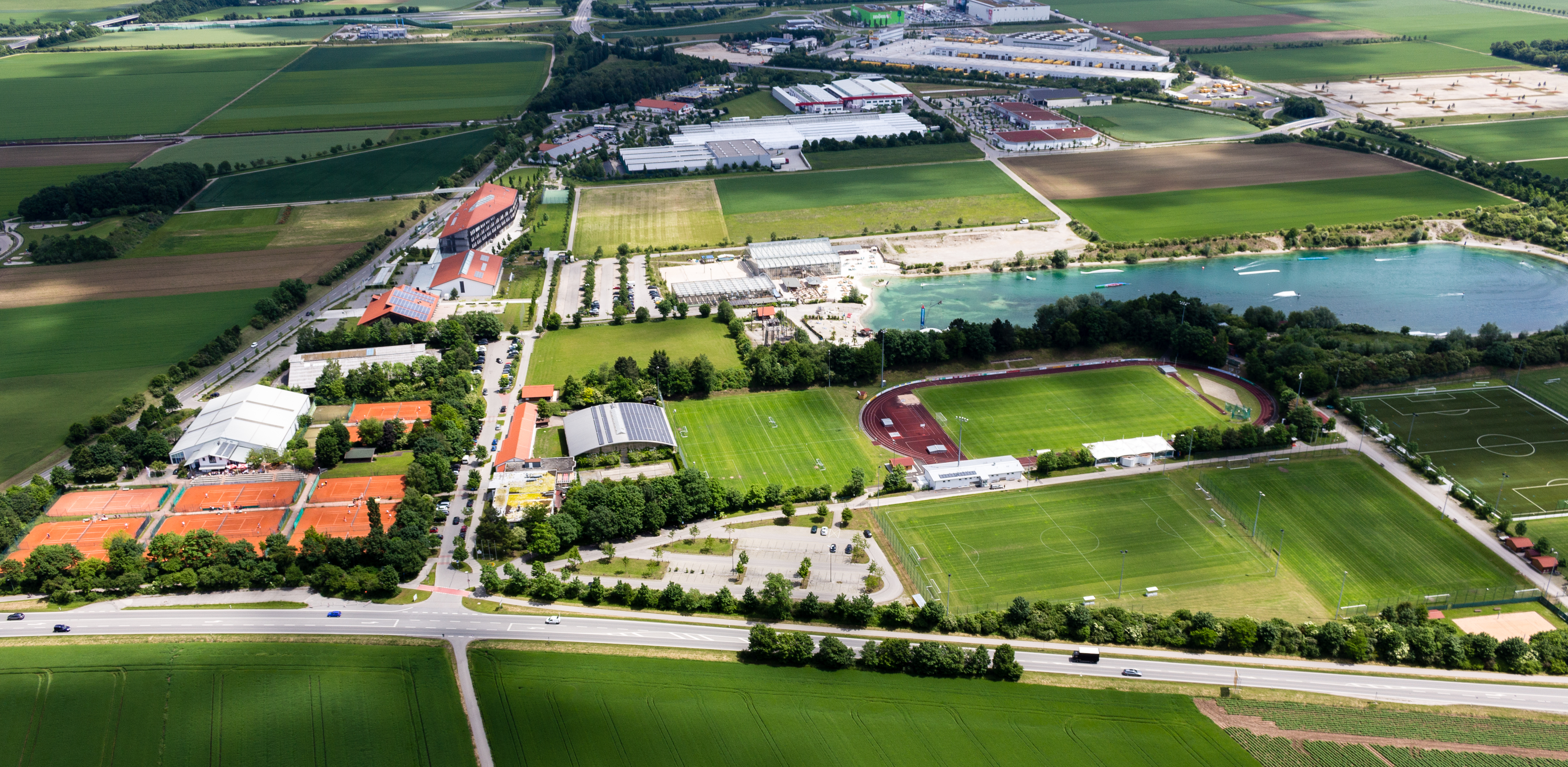
Sportpark Aschheim

Sportpark Aschheim is a football (soccer) stadium in Aschheim near Munich, Germany. It is the home stadium of FC Bayern Munich (women) and FC Aschheim 1956. The stadium has a capacity of 3,000 seats. It was also an official training ground during the 2006 FIFA World Cup, which was hosted by Germany.
