= Kotvrdovice =

- Municipality
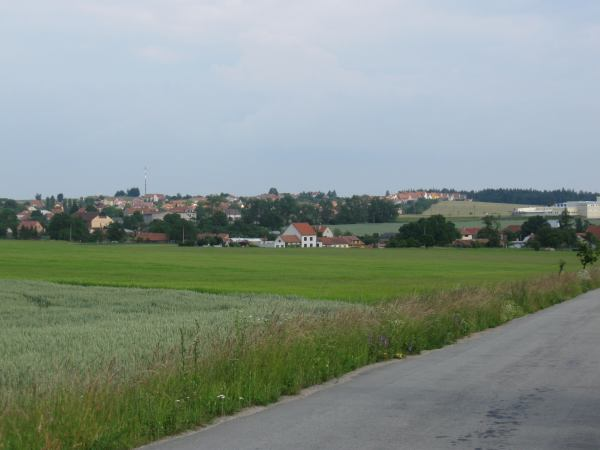
- General view of Kotvrdovice

- Flag Coat of arms

- Location in the Czech Republic
- Coordinates: 49°21′18″N 16°47′4″E
- Country: Czech Republic
- Region: South Moravian
- District: Blansko
- First mentioned: 1349

Area
  - Total: 5.58 km^{2} (2.15 sq mi)
- Elevation: 535 m (1,755 ft)

Population (2026-01-01)
  - Total: 927
  - Density: 166/km^{2} (430/sq mi)
- Time zone: UTC+1 (CET)
  - Summer (DST): UTC+2 (CEST)
- Postal code: 679 07
- Website: www.kotvrdovice.cz

Kotvrdovice (German: Gottfriedsschlag) is a municipality and village in Blansko District in the South Moravian Region of the Czech Republic. It has about 900 inhabitants.

== Demographics ==
Historical population
Year	Pop.	±%
1869	828	—
1880	862	+4.1%
1890	870	+0.9%
1900	845	−2.9%
1910	886	+4.9%
1921	962	+8.6%
1930	859	−10.7%
1950	848	−1.3%
1961	911	+7.4%
1970	890	−2.3%
1980	858	−3.6%
1991	866	+0.9%
2001	838	−3.2%
2011	862	+2.9%
2021	904	+4.9%
Source: Censuses

== Twin towns – sister cities ==
Kotvrdovice is twinned with:

- Aschheim, Germany
