= Sara Ito =

Japanese association football player

Personal information
- Date of birth: 11 November 2001 (age 25)
- Place of birth: Tokyo, Japan
- Height: 1.58 m (5 ft 2 in)
- Position: Midfielder

Team information
- Current team: Borussia Dortmund
- Number: 14

College career
Years	Team	Apps	(Gls)
- Furoku SC
–2019	Sekimae SC		

Senior career*
Years	Team	Apps	(Gls)
2019–2020	NTV Beleza	3	(0)
2021–2022	FC Wacker Innsbruck	9	(1)
2022–2023	Austria Wien	17	(2)
2023–2025	1. FFC Turbine Potsdam	41	(0)
2025–	Borussia Dortmund	35	(1)

International career
2017	Japan U16		
2018	Japan U17	3	(2)
2019	Japan U19		
- * Club domestic league appearances and goals as of 20 November 2026

Sara Ito (Japanese: 伊藤 沙羅, romanized: Itō Sara; born 11 November 2001) is a Japanese footballer who plays as midfielder and defender for German club Borussia Dortmund.

== Career ==
Ito started her career at NTV Beleza, before joining Austrian sides FC Wacker Innsbruck and Austria Wien, followed by German club 1. FFC Turbine Potsdam in 2023. In June 2025, she signed for Borussia Dortmund.

== International career ==
Ito has represented Japan at youth level.
