= Ramona Maier (footballer) =

German footballer

Personal information
- Date of birth: 15 September 1995 (age 31)
- Place of birth: Erding, Germany
- Height: 1.66 m (5 ft 5 in)
- Position: Forward

Team information
- Current team: Borussia Dortmund
- Number: 7

Youth career
- –2009: SpVgg Grün-Weiss Deggendorf
- 2009–2012: Bayern Munich

Senior career*
Years	Team	Apps	(Gls)
2012–2014	SC Regensburg		
2014–2022	FC Ingolstadt 04	168	(104)
2022–2026	SGS Essen	89	(21)
2026–	Borussia Dortmund	13	(7)
- * Club domestic league appearances and goals as of 20 November 2026

Ramona Maier (born 19 September 1995) is a German footballer who plays as a striker for Borussia Dortmund. Maier had previously played for FC Ingolstadt 04 and SGS Essen.
