= Jacqueline Meißner =

German footballer (born 1994)

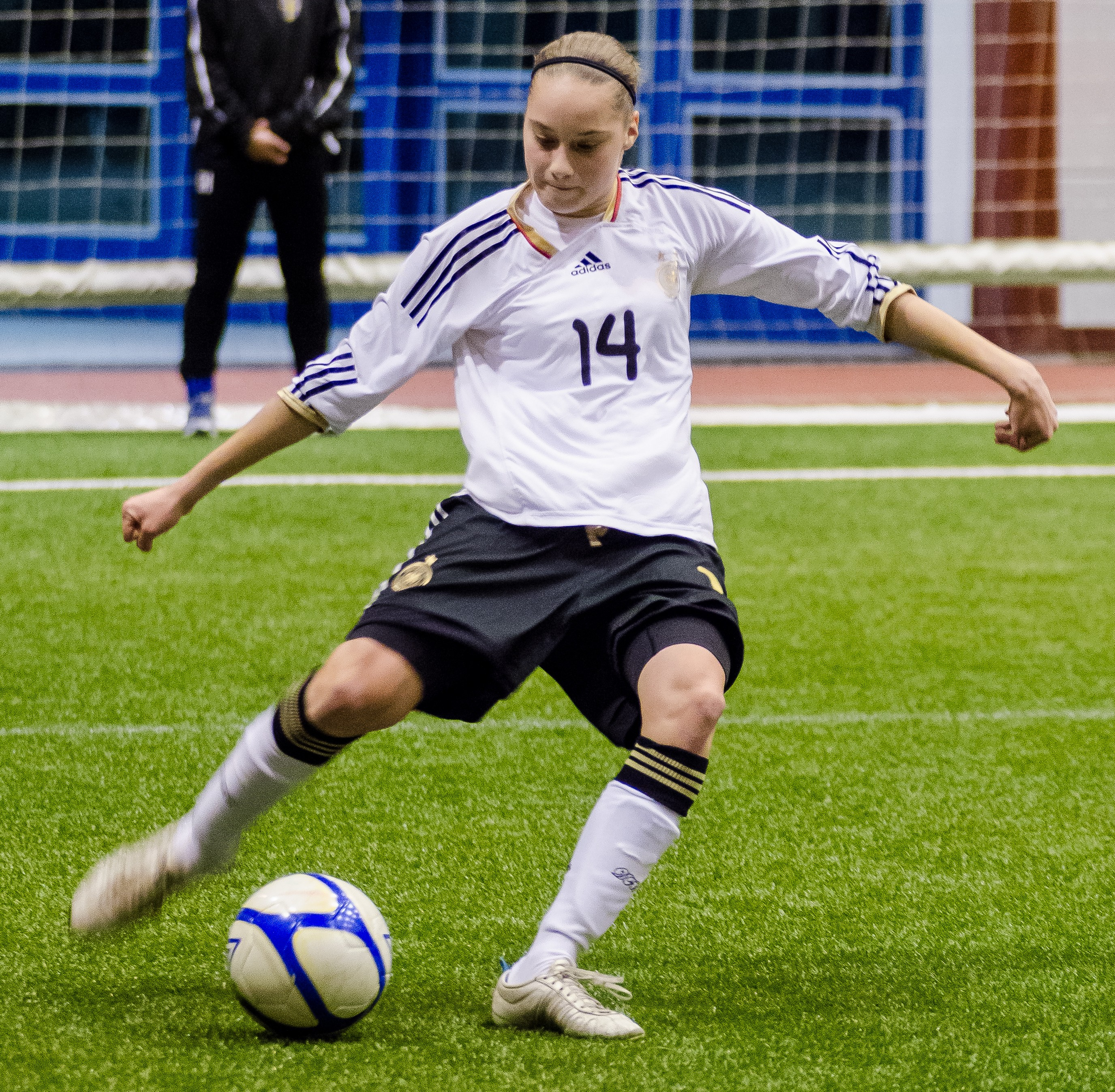
- Meißner with Germany U19 in 2012

Personal information
- Birth name: Jacqueline Klasen
- Date of birth: 4 February 1994 (age 32)
- Place of birth: Dortmund, Germany
- Height: 1.68 m (5 ft 6 in)
- Position: Right-back

Team information
- Current team: Borussia Dortmund
- Number: 16

Senior career*
Years	Team	Apps	(Gls)
2011–2026	SGS Essen	291	(13)
2026–	Borussia Dortmund	13	(2)

International career
2012–2013	Germany U19	6	(0)
2016–2018	Germany	3	(0)
- * Club domestic league appearances and goals as of 20 November 2026

Jacqueline Meißner (née Klasen; born 4 February 1994) is a German professional footballer who plays as a right-back for Frauen-Regionalliga club Borussia Dortmund. She made three appearances for the Germany national team from 2016 to 2018.

== Career statistics ==
=== International ===
As of match played 7 March 2018

Appearances and goals by national team and year
National team	Year	Apps	Goals
Germany	2016	1	0
Germany	2017	0	0
Germany	2018	2	0
Total		3	0
