= Markus Högner =

German footballer (born 1967)

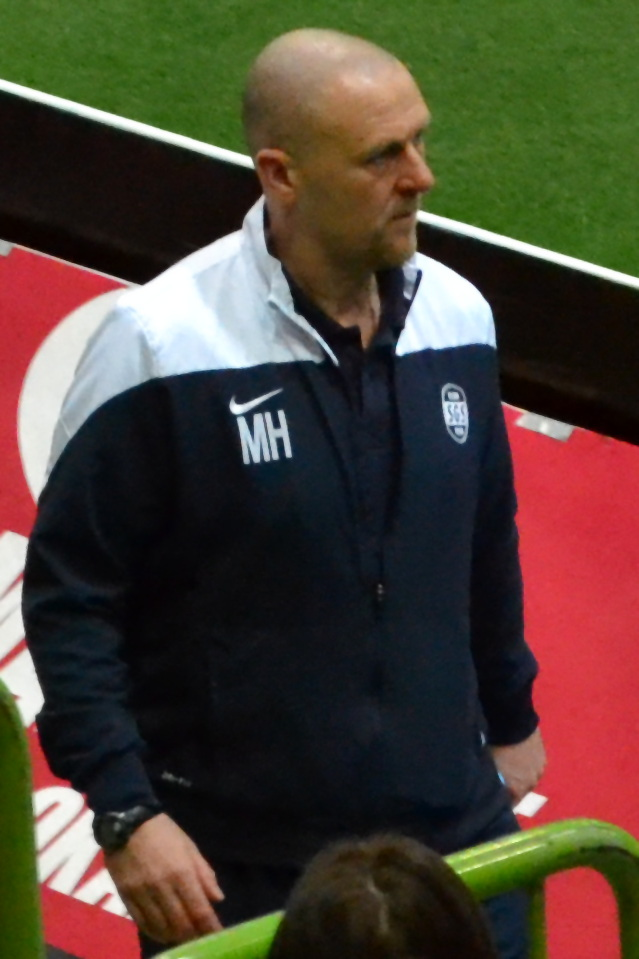
- Högner in 2016

Personal information
- Date of birth: 26 May 1967 (age 59)
- Place of birth: Ettringen, Mayen-Koblenz, Germany
- Position: Midfielder

Senior career*
Years	Team	Apps	(Gls)
1988–1991	Alemannia Aachen		
1992–1993	TuRU Düsseldorf		
1993–1995	Alajuelense		
1995–1999	SV Rhenania Würselen		
1999–2001	Union Solingen		

Managerial career
- 2004–2008: Alemannia Aachen (youth)
- 2008–2009: Schalke 04 II
- 2010–2016: SGS Essen
- 2018–2019: VfL Wolfsburg (women)
- 2019–2025: SGS Essen
- 2025–: Borussia Dortmund (women)
- * Club domestic league appearances and goals

Markus Högner (born 26 April 1967) is a German football coach and former player who coaches Borussia Dortmund (women).

== Coaching career ==
In the 2008–09 season, Högner became head coach of Schalke 04 II but was dismissed in May 2009.

From May 2010 until the summer of 2016, Högner served as head coach of the Bundesliga women's team SGS Essen.

In September 2016, he joined the German women's national team as assistant coach to Steffi Jones, working alongside Verena Hagedorn.

On 31 May 2018, he became assistant coach of the VfL Wolfsburg women's team. His contract was terminated on 8 January 2019.

Three days later, he signed a new contract with SGS Essen, returning as head coach for the 2019–20 season.

In February 2025, Högner took over as head coach of the Borussia Dortmund women's team.
