= Aschheim =

- Municipality
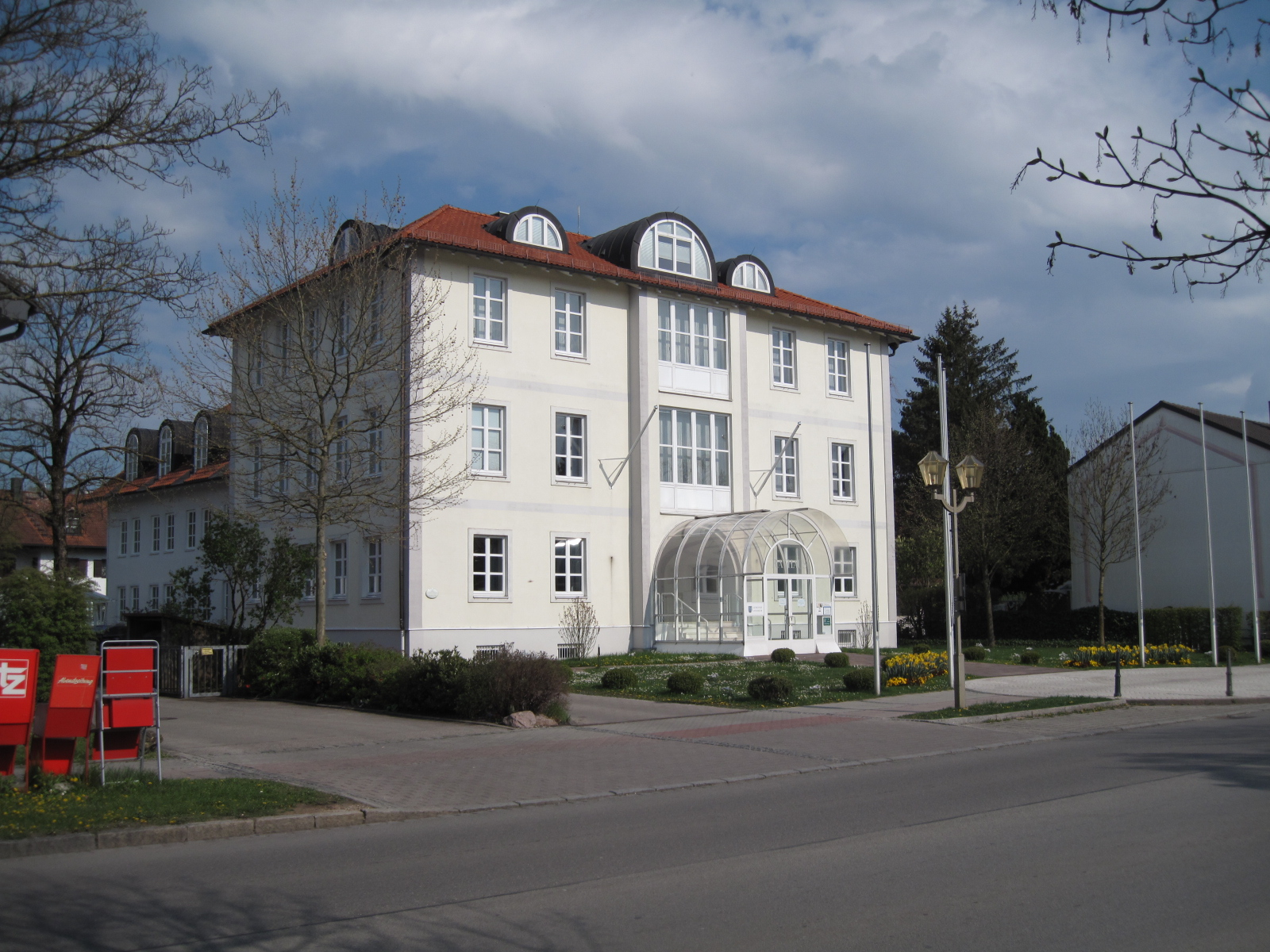
- Town hall

- Coat of arms

- Location of Aschheim within Munich district
- Interactive map of Aschheim
- Location within Germany Location within Bavaria
- Coordinates: 48°10′24″N 11°43′04″E
- Country: Germany
- State: Bavaria
- Admin. region: Oberbayern
- District: Munich
- Subdivisions: 2 Ortsteile

Government
  - Mayor (2020–26): Thomas Glashauser (CSU)

Area
  - Total: 28.05 km^{2} (10.83 sq mi)
- Elevation: 512 m (1,680 ft)

Population (2025-12-31)
  - Total: 8,998
  - Density: 320.8/km^{2} (830.8/sq mi)
- Time zone: UTC+01:00 (CET)
  - Summer (DST): UTC+02:00 (CEST)
- Postal codes: 85609
- Dialling codes: 089
- Vehicle registration: M
- Website: www.aschheim.de

Aschheim (German pronunciation: [ˈaʃhaɪm]) is a small town and municipality in the district of Munich in Bavaria in Germany. It lies beyond the northeastern outskirts of Munich.

Aschheim is the location of BMW's test track opened by the manufacturer in 1972, and also has a golf club, established in 1990.

== History ==
The name "Aschheim" was first mentioned in 756/757 as "ascheim". In the course of the administrative reforms in Bavaria between 1808 and 1818, Aschheim and Dornach became independent political communities. Aschheim Central School was completed in 1813, and a larger building was built in 1905. In 1835, the Bavarian king granted Aschheim as a fiefdom for the last time.

In 1929 the Ismaning Reservoir was built to the north of Aschheim.

On May 1, 1978, Aschheim and Dornach were united to form the municipality of Aschheim in the course of further administrative reforms.

== Notable people ==
- Patrick Bussler (born 1984), snowboarder

== Twin towns ==
Aschheim is twinned with:

- Mougins, France
- Leros, Greece
- Jedovnice, Czech Republic
- Kotvrdovice, Czech Republic
