= 1. FC Köln (women) =

- Founded: 2009
- Ground: Franz-Kremer-Stadion
- Capacity: 14,944
- President: Werner Wolf
- Coach: Britta Carlson
- League: Frauen-Bundesliga
- 2025–26: Bundesliga, 7th of 14
- Website: fc-koeln.de/1-frauen
Home colours	Away colours	Third colours

1. FC Köln Frauen is a German women's football club based in Cologne, North Rhine-Westphalia, currently competing in the Bundesliga, the top flight of German football.

== History ==
The club existed since July 2009 when FFC Brauweiler Pulheim dissolved their club to join 1. FC Köln. In their first season in 2009–10, they managed to come in third in the 2. Bundesliga. They achieved promotion to the Bundesliga in 2015. The team is coached by Daniel Weber.

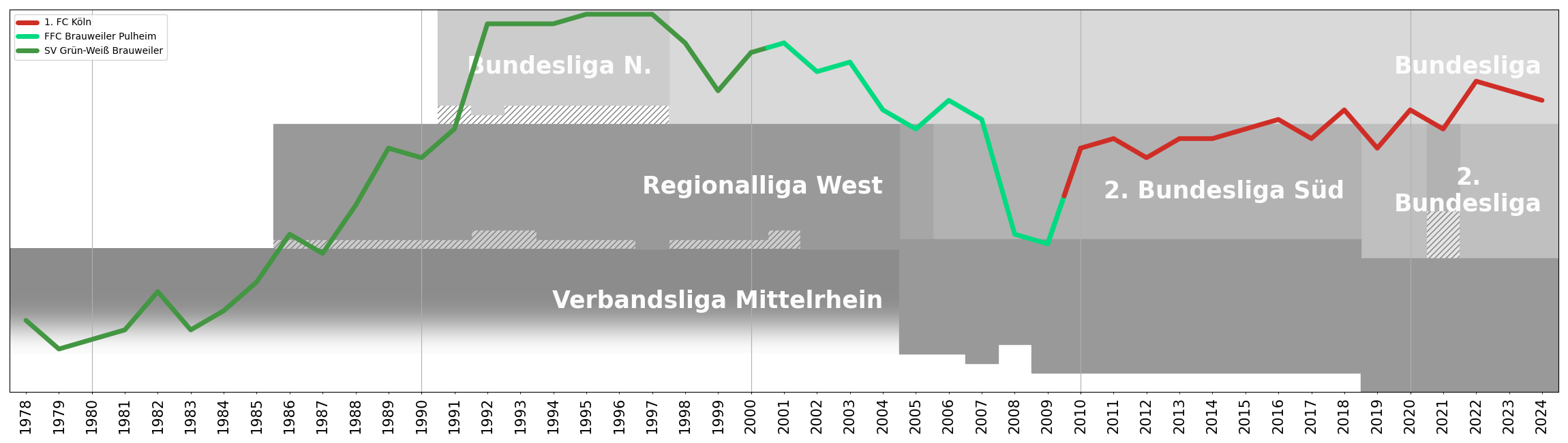
Chart of league positions at end of season

== Current squad ==
As of 6 August 2026

Note: Flags indicate national team as defined under FIFA eligibility rules; some limited exceptions apply. Players may hold more than one non-FIFA nationality.

No.	Pos.	Nation	Player
1	GK	GER	Lisa Schmitz
2	DF	GER	Lina Száraz
3	MF	ISL	Sædís Rún Heiðarsdóttir
4	DF	GER	Kathrin Hendrich
5	MF	AUT	Celina Degen
6	MF	GER	Jil Schäfer
7	FW	GER	Anna-Lena Stolze
8	MF	GER	Laura Vogt
9	FW	GER	Pauline Bremer
10	MF	POL	Weronika Zawistowska
11	DF	ISL	Sandra Jessen
12	GK	GER	Paula Hoppe
13	DF	GER	Merle Hokamp
14	DF	GER	Carlotta Imping
15	MF	GER	Amelie Bohnen
17	MF	SUI	Lydia Andrade

No.	Pos.	Nation	Player
18	MF	USA	Taylor Ziemer
19	FW	HUN	Dóra Zeller
20	MF	GER	Carolin Elsen
21	DF	GER	Anna Gerhardt
22	MF	GER	Julia Schiffarth
24	DF	NOR	Elise Stenevik
25	DF	GER	Laura Donhauser
26	FW	GER	Laureta Elmazi
27	MF	AUT	Laura Feiersinger
28	MF	AUT	Alina Kerschbaumer
29	FW	GER	Vanessa Leimenstoll
30	MF	GER	Sophie Nachtigall
31	GK	GER	Inga Schuldt
33	DF	GER	Marina Hegering (captain)
34	GK	SUI	Irina Fuchs
35	GK	GER	Pauline Nelles
37	DF	GER	Beke Sterner

=== Out on loan ===
Note: Flags indicate national team as defined under FIFA eligibility rules; some limited exceptions apply. Players may hold more than one non-FIFA nationality.

No.	Pos.	Nation	Player

== Former players ==
For notable current and former players, see Category:1. FC Köln (women) players.

- (Bosnia and Herzegovina) Lidija Kulis
- (Denmark) Stina Lykke Borg
- (Republic of Ireland) Amber Barrett
- (Poland) Sylwia Matysik
- (Canada) Christina Julien
- (Germany) Julia Arnold

== Past seasons ==
Season	League	Place	W	D	L	GF	GA	Pts	DFB-Cup
2009–10	2. Bundesliga (women)	3	14	3	5	54	24	45	Quarterfinal
2010–11	2. Bundesliga (women)	2	16	3	3	74	19	51	Round of 16
2011–12	2. Bundesliga (women)	4	10	3	9	36	28	33	Round 1
2012–13	2. Bundesliga (women)	2	17	4	1	66	14	55	Round of 16
2013–14	2. Bundesliga (women)	2	17	2	3	67	22	53	Quarterfinal
2014–15	2. Bundesliga (women)	1	20	2	0	67	14	62	Quarterfinal
2015–16	Bundesliga (women)	12	3	3	16	20	60	12	Round of 16
2016–17	2. Bundesliga (women)	2	15	2	5	48	23	47	Round 1
2017–18	Bundesliga (women)	11	3	2	17	8	78	11	Round of 16
2018–19	2. Bundesliga (women)	3	14	5	7	51	33	47	Round 2
2019–20	Bundesliga (women)	11	5	2	15	22	60	17	Round of 16
2020–21	2. Bundesliga (women)	1	15	1	0	49	10	46	Round of 16
2021–22	Bundesliga (women)	8	5	7	10	22	45	22	Round of 16
2022–23	Bundesliga (women)	9	5	4	13	20	44	19	Quarterfinal
2023–24	Bundesliga (women)	10	5	3	14	25	43	18	Round of 16
2024–25	Bundesliga (women)	10	3	5	14	18	51	15	Second round
Green marks a season followed by promotion, red a season followed by relegation.
