= RB Leipzig (women) =

- Full name: RasenBallsport Leipzig e.V.
- Nickname: Die Roten Bullen (The Red Bulls)
- Short name: RBL
- Founded: 2016; 10 years ago
- Ground: Trainingszentrum am Cottaweg, Platz 1, Leipzig
- Capacity: 2,015
- Owner: Red Bull GmbH (99%) (of GmbH)
- CEO: Oliver Mintzlaff
- Head coach: Jonas Stephan
- League: Frauen-Bundesliga
- 2025–26: Bundesliga, 10th of 14
- Website: https://rbleipzig.com
Home colours	Away colours	Third colours

RB Leipzig are a German women's football club based in Leipzig that competes in the Bundesliga, the top tier of football in Germany. Their second team has been part of the Regionalliga since 2020.

== History ==
=== Establishment ===
RB Leipzig entered women's football in 2016. The club initially planned to partner with Leipziger FC 07, forming a joint team in the fourth tier Landesliga Sachsen. The partnership was meant to last for one year, after which RB Leipzig was to continue as an independent, and reserved the right to advance. RB Leipzig and Leipziger FC 07 were given a playing right for the 2016–17 Landesliga Sachsen on a wild card by the Saxony Football Association (SFV). A few weeks before the start of the season, the partnership ended and RB Leipzig announced that it was to compete as an independent.

The first squad gathered 17 players from FFV Leipzig, five talents from the RB Leipzig women's junior teams and one from the reserve team of FF USV Jena. The team was trained by Sebastian Popp, former head coach of women's football team SV Eintracht Leipzig-Süd. The SFV expected the RB Leipzig women's team, with the state training centre for women's and girls' football, to advance from Landesliga Sachsen to Bundesliga within 3 to 5 years.

The team played its first competitive match on 7 August 2016 in the first round of the 2016–17 Saxony Cup away against SV Johannstadt 90. RB Leipzig recorded a 7–0 victory, and advanced to the next round.

The RB Leipzig women's team joined the 2016–17 Landesliga Sachsen (effectively skipping the 5th tier), generating criticism from several clubs. The criticisms were heard, and after a roundtable discussion with other clubs and the SFV, Leipzig offered to play the season starting seven youth players each game. The SFV also ordered the first three games to be replayed and disqualified Leipzig from the Saxony Cup. RB Leipzig won the league with four matchdays remaining.

After finishing 4th and 3rd in their first two seasons in the third tier, Leipzig won the Regionalliga Nordost and achieved promotion to the second division after the 2019–20 season's completion was cancelled due to the COVID-19 pandemic in Germany.

In the 2022–23 season, Leipzig secured promotion to the Bundesliga with six matches remaining. They later won the division's title with four matches left, following a 6–0 away win over Eintracht Frankfurt II.

== Stadium ==
The team play home matches at the Sportanlage Gontardweg, which is the location of the state training centre for women's and girls football of the SFV, taken over by RB Leipzig from FFV Leipzig in July 2016.

== Players ==
=== First team squad ===
As of 17 July 2026

Note: Flags indicate national team as defined under FIFA eligibility rules; some limited exceptions apply. Players may hold more than one non-FIFA nationality.

No.	Pos.	Nation	Player
1	GK	SUI	Elvira Herzog
3	DF	NOR	Andrea Norheim
4	DF	BEL	Zenia Mertens
5	MF	GER	Nele Quietzsch
6	DF	FRA	Lou-Ann Joly
7	FW	NED	Nikée van Dijk
8	FW	ISL	Emilía Ásgeirsdóttir
9	FW	GHA	Persis Oteng
12	DF	BEL	Jasmine Mathys
13	FW	GER	Sandra Starke
14	FW	GER	Marleen Schimmer
15	DF	HUN	Diána Németh
16	MF	AUT	Annabel Schasching

No.	Pos.	Nation	Player
17	FW	GER	Delice Boboy
18	MF	HUN	Sára Pusztai
19	FW	GER	Marie Kleemann
20	FW	SUI	Emanuela Pfister
22	DF	NED	Alieke Tuin
23	GK	AUT	Sophie Lindner
24	DF	DEN	Nikoline Dudek
25	DF	NED	Linde Veefkind
27	FW	SWE	Therese Simonsson
30	DF	SUI	Lara Marti
44	GK	GER	Mirja Kropp
71	GK	BEL	Aude Waldbillig
77	FW	NED	Charlotte Hulst

==== Out on loan ====
Note: Flags indicate national team as defined under FIFA eligibility rules; some limited exceptions apply. Players may hold more than one non-FIFA nationality.

No.	Pos.	Nation	Player
15	FW	JPN	Mai Kadowaki (on loan at RB Omiya Ardija until 30 June 2026)

=== Former players ===
For notable current and former players, see Category:RB Leipzig (women) players.

- (Austria) Julia Magerl
- (Sweden) Mimmi Larsson

== Seasons ==
Season	Division	Pld	W	D	L	GF	GA	Pts	Pos	DFB Pokal (Note: The DFB-Pokal Frauen only invites teams from the country's top two divisions, and the winners of the regional cups which serve as qualifying tournaments.)	Competition	Result	Competition	Result	Player(s)	Goals
Season	League									DFB Pokal	Europe		Other (Note: Only teams in the third division and below participate in the regional cups.)		Top League Scorer	
2016–17	Landesliga Frauen Sachsen	24	23	1	0	—	—	70	1st	-	—	—	Sachsenpokal	DQ (Note: Leipzig were disqualified after protests over the composition of their squad after their formation in the summer of 2016.)	—	—
2017–18	Regionalliga Nordost	22	15	2	5	—	—	47	4th	-	—	—	Sachsenpokal	SF	—	—
2018–19	Regionalliga Nordost	22	18	0	4	—	—	54	3rd	-	—	—	Sachsenpokal	W	—	—
2019–20	Regionalliga Nordost	15	14	1	0	—	—	43	1st (Note: Season was abandoned after 15 matches due to COVID-19.)	2R	—	—	Sachsenpokal	W	—	—
2020–21	2. Frauen-Bundesliga	16	8	2	6	32	30	26	3rd	R16	—	—	—	—	Vanessa Fudalla	6
2021–22	2. Frauen-Bundesliga	26	17	2	7	70	46	53	3rd	2R	—	—	—	—	Vanessa Fudalla	17
2022–23	2. Frauen-Bundesliga	26	21	1	4	84	23	64	1st	SF	—	—	—	—	Vanessa Fudalla	20
2023–24	Frauen-Bundesliga	22	7	5	10	26	41	26	8th	R16	—	—	—	—	Vanessa Fudalla	10
2024–25	Frauen-Bundesliga	22	8	3	11	30	40	27	8th	2R	—	—	—	—	Giovanna Hoffmann	11
2025–26	Frauen-Bundesliga	26	7	7	12	39	48	28	10th	R16	—	—	—	—	three players	6

=== Key ===
Key to league:

- P = Played
- W = Games won
- D = Games drawn
- L = Games lost
- GF = Goals for
- GA = Goals against
- Pts = Points
- Pos = Final position

Key to divisions and rounds:

- W = Champions
- RU = Final (Runners-up)
- SF = Semi-finals
- QF = Quarter-finals
- R32/R16 = Round of 32, Round of 16, etc.
- 1R/2R = 1st Round, 2nd Round, etc.

Champions	Runners-up	Current Season

== Honours ==
=== League ===
- 2. Bundesliga (II)
  - Champions: 2022–23
- Regionalliga Nordost (III)
  - Champions: 2019–20
- Landesliga Sachsen (IV)
  - Champions: 2016–17

=== Cup ===
- Saxony Cup (de)
  - Champions: 2018–19, 2019–20
