= 2022–23 2. Frauen-Bundesliga =

2. Frauen-Bundesliga
- Season: 2022–23
- Dates: 27 August 2022 – 29 May 2023
- Champions: RB Leipzig
- Promoted: RB Leipzig; 1. FC Nürnberg
- Relegated: SC Freiburg II; 1. FC Köln II; Turbine Potsdam II
- Matches played: 182
- Goals scored: 580 (3.19 per match)
- Top goalscorer: Vanessa Fudalla (20 goals)
- Biggest home win: Leipzig 10–2 Köln II; Leipzig 8–0 Hoffenheim II
- Biggest away win: Potsdam II 1–7 Andernach; Frankfurt II 0–6 Leipzig
- Highest scoring: Leipzig 10–2 Köln II
- Longest winning run: 4 games RB Leipzig
- Longest unbeaten run: 5 games three teams Gütersloh; Leipzig
- Longest winless run: 8 games Köln II
- Longest losing run: 2 games Freiburg II; Köln II
- Attendance: 35,861 (197 per match)

The 2022–23 season of the 2. Frauen-Bundesliga was the 19th season of Germany's second-tier women's football league. It ran from 16 September 2022 to 29 May 2023.

The fixtures were announced on 5 July 2022.

RB Leipzig and 1. FC Nürnberg were promoted to the Frauen-Bundesliga. SC Freiburg II, 1. FC Köln II and Turbine Potsdam II all got relegated to the Frauen-Regionalliga.

== Teams ==
Locations of teams in the 2022–23 2. Frauen-Bundesliga

=== Team changes ===
Entering league		Exiting league	
Promoted from 2021–22 Regionalliga	Relegated from 2021–22 Bundesliga	Promoted to 2022–23 Bundesliga	Relegated to 2022–23 Regionalliga
SC Freiburg II; Turbine Potsdam II; 1. FC Köln II	SC Sand; Carl Zeiss Jena	SV Meppen; MSV Duisburg	SV Elversberg; SV Henstedt-Ulzburg; Borussia Bocholt

=== Stadiums ===
Team	Home city	Home ground	Capacity
SG Andernach	Andernach	Stadion am Bassenheimer Weg	15,220
Eintracht Frankfurt II	Frankfurt	Stadion am Brentanobad	5,200
SC Freiburg II	Freiburg	Schönbergstadion	3,000
FSV Gütersloh	Gütersloh	Tönnies-Arena	4,252
1899 Hoffenheim II	Sinsheim	Ensinger-Stadion	4,000
FC Ingolstadt	Ingolstadt	ESV-Stadion	11,481
1. FC Köln II	Cologne	Neue Sandkaul	2,500
RB Leipzig	Leipzig	Sportanlage Gontardweg	1,300
Carl Zeiss Jena	Jena	Ernst-Abbe-Sportfeld	10,445
Bayern Munich II	Munich	FC Bayern Campus	2,500
1. FC Nürnberg	Nuremberg	Sportpark Valznerweiher	7,000
Turbine Potsdam II	Potsdam	Sportforum Waldstadt	5,000
SC Sand	Willstätt	Kühnmatt Stadion	2,000
VfL Wolfsburg II	Wolfsburg	AOK Stadion	5,200

== League table ==
Pos	Team	Pld	W	D	L	GF	GA	GD	Pts	Promotion or relegation
1	RB Leipzig (C, P)	26	21	1	4	84	23	+61	64	Promotion to Bundesliga
2	1. FC Nürnberg (P)	26	17	1	8	54	31	+23	52	Promotion to Bundesliga
3	FSV Gütersloh	26	16	3	7	49	29	+20	51	
4	Bayern Munich II (Note: Reserve teams cannot compete in the Frauen-Bundesliga and are therefore ineligible for promotion.)	26	13	4	9	35	28	+7	43	
5	SG Andernach	26	11	9	6	62	39	+23	42	
6	VfL Wolfsburg II	26	10	7	9	32	41	−9	37	
7	SC Sand	26	9	8	9	24	25	−1	35	
8	Carl Zeiss Jena	26	10	4	12	43	44	−1	34	
9	Eintracht Frankfurt II	26	10	4	12	38	43	−5	34	
10	1899 Hoffenheim II	26	9	6	11	37	49	−12	33	
11	FC Ingolstadt	26	9	4	13	27	43	−16	31	
12	SC Freiburg II (R)	26	8	4	14	39	43	−4	28	Relegation to Regionalliga
13	1. FC Köln II (R)	26	4	6	16	28	68	−40	18	Relegation to Regionalliga
14	Turbine Potsdam II (R)	26	3	3	20	28	74	−46	12	Relegation to Regionalliga

Source: DFB
Rules for classification: 1) Points; 2) Goal difference; 3) Goals scored; 4) Head-to-head results; 5) Head-to-head away goals scored; 6) Away goals scored; 7) Play-off.
(C) Champions; (P) Promoted; (R) Relegated

== Results ==
Home \ Away	AND	FR2	FRE	GÜT	HO2	ING	KÖ2	LEI	JEN	MU2	NÜR	PO2	SAN	WO2
SG Andernach	—	4–4	3–1	0–0	0–0	0–2	6–1	1–3	2–2	0–0	3–1	5–1	2–0	1–1
Eintracht Frankfurt II	1–2	—	3–1	1–1	0–1	3–2	0–1	0–6	3–1	1–2	1–2	4–1	2–1	1–0
SC Freiburg II	3–3	1–2	—	1–6	2–3	2–0	0–0	1–2	1–0	0–2	0–2	3–1	0–0	0–1
FSV Gütersloh	2–0	2–0	2–1	—	0–2	1–2	4–0	0–4	0–2	1–0	2–1	2–0	5–1	3–1
1899 Hoffenheim II	2–3	4–5	1–0	2–4	—	3–0	3–2	0–3	0–3	1–1	4–0	1–1	0–0	1–1
FC Ingolstadt	0–4	0–1	1–0	2–1	1–1	—	2–4	0–1	0–4	0–3	0–2	3–2	0–0	0–1
1. FC Köln II	1–1	0–0	0–3	0–1	3–1	1–2	—	1–4	2–3	0–3	0–2	2–1	1–1	3–3
RB Leipzig	2–3	2–1	5–2	1–2	8–0	0–1	10–2	—	5–1	3–0	1–0	5–0	0–1	3–1
Carl Zeiss Jena	3–2	2–1	0–4	2–2	1–3	2–2	5–1	1–2	—	2–0	2–3	1–2	1–0	2–2
Bayern Munich II	2–6	0–1	0–4	1–2	2–1	2–0	3–0	1–1	1–0	—	3–0	4–1	0–0	1–0
1. FC Nürnberg	2–1	2–1	2–4	2–0	3–0	3–0	6–2	1–2	1–0	2–1	—	3–0	2–3	5–0
Turbine Potsdam II	1–7	3–2	1–3	1–3	4–0	0–3	0–0	2–5	1–3	1–2	0–4	—	0–2	0–1
SC Sand	1–1	0–0	2–1	2–0	0–1	1–3	1–0	0–2	1–2	0–1	1–1	2–0	—	2–0
VfL Wolfsburg II	3–2	2–0	1–1	2–1	2–1	1–1	2–1	1–4	1–0	1–0	0–2	4–4	0–2	—

Source: DFB
Legend: Blue = home team win; Yellow = draw; Red = away team win.

== Top scorers ==
Rank	Player	Club	Goals
1	(Germany) Vanessa Fudalla	RB Leipzig	20
2	(Germany) Jacqueline Baumgärtel	FSV Gütersloh	14
3	(Germany) Medina Dešić	RB Leipzig	12
3	(Germany) Jenny Hipp	RB Leipzig	12
3	(Germany) Carolin Schraa	SG Andernach	12
6	(Germany) Luca-Emily Birkholz	Carl Zeiss Jena	11
6	(Germany) Kathrin Schermuly	SG Andernach	11
8	(Germany) Lisa Kossmann	SG Andernach	10
8	(Germany) Anne Rotzinger	SC Freiburg II	10
8	(Germany) Marie Steiner	1899 Hoffenheim II	10
