= 2020–21 in German football =

Football in Germany
- Season: 2020–21

Men's football
- Bundesliga: Bayern Munich
- 2. Bundesliga: VfL Bochum
- 3. Liga: Dynamo Dresden
- DFB-Pokal: Borussia Dortmund
- DFL-Supercup: Bayern Munich

Women's football
- Frauen-Bundesliga: Bayern Munich
- 2. Frauen-Bundesliga: Carl Zeiss Jena; 1. FC Köln
- DFB-Pokal Frauen: VfL Wolfsburg

The 2020–21 season was the 111th season of competitive football in Germany.

== Promotion and relegation ==
=== Pre-season ===
League	Promoted to league	Relegated from league
Bundesliga	Arminia Bielefeld; VfB Stuttgart	Fortuna Düsseldorf; SC Paderborn
2. Bundesliga	Würzburger Kickers; Eintracht Braunschweig	Wehen Wiesbaden; Dynamo Dresden
3. Liga	VfB Lübeck; Türkgücü München; 1. FC Saarbrücken; SC Verl	Chemnitzer FC; Preußen Münster; Sonnenhof Großaspach; Carl Zeiss Jena
Frauen-Bundesliga	Werder Bremen; SV Meppen	1. FC Köln; Carl Zeiss Jena
2. Frauen-Bundesliga	SpVg Berghofen; Borussia Bocholt; RB Leipzig; 1. FFC 08 Niederkirchen; Würzburger Kickers	None (season cancelled)

=== Post-season ===
League	Promoted to league	Relegated from league
Bundesliga	VfL Bochum; Greuther Fürth	Werder Bremen; Schalke 04
2. Bundesliga	Dynamo Dresden; Hansa Rostock; FC Ingolstadt	VfL Osnabrück; Eintracht Braunschweig; Würzburger Kickers
3. Liga	Viktoria Berlin; Borussia Dortmund II; SC Freiburg II; TSV Havelse	KFC Uerdingen^{1}; Bayern Munich II; VfB Lübeck; SpVgg Unterhaching
Frauen-Bundesliga	Carl Zeiss Jena; 1. FC Köln	SV Meppen; MSV Duisburg
2. Frauen-Bundesliga	SV Göttelborn; SV Henstedt-Ulzburg; 1. FC Nürnberg	Borussia Mönchengladbach; Turbine Potsdam II; Arminia Bielefeld; SpVg Berghofen; BV Cloppenburg; 1. FC Saarbrücken; Würzburger Kickers; 1. FFC 08 Niederkirchen

^1 KFC Uerdingen did not receive a 3. Liga license, sparing SV Meppen from relegation.

== National teams ==
Win Draw Loss Void

=== Germany national football team ===
==== Kits ====
Home	Away alt. 1

==== 2020–21 UEFA Nations League ====
===== 2020–21 UEFA Nations League A Group 4 =====
Pos	Team	Pld	W	D	L	GF	GA	GD	Pts	Qualification or relegation	(Spain)	(Germany)	(Switzerland)	(Ukraine)
1	Spain	6	3	2	1	13	3	+10	11	Qualification for Nations League Finals	—	6–0	1–0	4–0
2	Germany	6	2	3	1	10	13	−3	9		1–1	—	3–3	3–1
3	Switzerland	6	1	3	2	9	8	+1	6 (Note: Tied on head-to-head points (3). Head-to-head goal difference: Switzerland +2, Ukraine −2.)		1–1	1–1	—	3–0 (Note: The Switzerland v Ukraine match was awarded as a 3–0 win to Switzerland after being cancelled as Ukraine were placed in quarantine prior to the match due to positive SARS-CoV-2 tests in the team.)
4	Ukraine (R)	6	2	0	4	5	13	−8	6	Relegation to League B	1–0	1–2	2–1	—

Source: UEFA
Rules for classification: Tiebreakers
(R) Relegated

===== 2020–21 UEFA Nations League fixtures and results =====
3 September 2020 2020–21 UEFA Nations League A	Germany	1–1	Spain	Stuttgart
20:45 (20:45 UTC+2)	Werner 51'	Report	Gayà 90+6'	Stadium: Mercedes-Benz Arena; Attendance: 0 (Note: Due to the COVID-19 pandemic in Europe, all matches scheduled for September 2020 will be played behind closed doors.); Referee: Daniele Orsato (Italy)
Note: The match was played behind closed doors.

6 September 2020 2020–21 UEFA Nations League A	Switzerland	1–1	Germany	Basel
20:45 (20:45 UTC+2)	Widmer 58'	Report	Gündoğan 14'	Stadium: St. Jakob-Park; Attendance: 0 Referee: Michael Oliver (England)
Note: The match was played behind closed doors.

10 October 2020 2020–21 UEFA Nations League A	Ukraine	1–2	Germany	Kyiv
20:45 (21:45 UTC+3)	Malinovskyi 77' (pen.)	Report	Ginter 20'; Goretzka 49'	Stadium: NSC Olimpiyskiy; Attendance: 17,573; Referee: Orel Grinfeld (Israel)

13 October 2020 2020–21 UEFA Nations League A	Germany	3–3	Switzerland	Cologne
20:45 (20:45 UTC+2)	Werner 28'; Havertz 55'; Gnabry 60'	Report	Gavranović 5', 57'; Freuler 26'	Stadium: RheinEnergieStadion; Attendance: 0 Referee: Ruddy Buquet (France)
Note: Due to the COVID-19 pandemic in Germany, the match was played behind closed doors.

14 November 2020 2020–21 UEFA Nations League A	Germany	3–1	Ukraine	Leipzig
20:45 (20:45 UTC+1)	Sané 23'; Werner 33', 64'	Report	Yaremchuk 12'	Stadium: Red Bull Arena; Attendance: 0 Referee: Ovidiu Hațegan (Romania)
Note: Due to the COVID-19 pandemic in Germany, the match was played behind closed doors.

17 November 2020 2020–21 UEFA Nations League A	Spain	6–0	Germany	Seville
20:45 (20:45 UTC+1)	Morata 17'; Torres 33', 55', 71'; Rodri 38'; Oyarzabal 89'	Report		Stadium: La Cartuja; Attendance: 0 Referee: Andreas Ekberg (Sweden)
Note: Due to the COVID-19 pandemic in Spain, the match was played behind closed doors.

==== UEFA Euro 2020 ====
===== UEFA Euro 2020 Group F =====
Pos	Team	Pld	W	D	L	GF	GA	GD	Pts	Qualification
1	France	3	1	2	0	4	3	+1	5	Advance to knockout stage
2	Germany (H)	3	1	1	1	6	5	+1	4 (Note: Head-to-head result: Portugal 2–4 Germany.)	Advance to knockout stage
3	Portugal	3	1	1	1	7	6	+1	4	Advance to knockout stage
4	Hungary (H)	3	0	2	1	3	6	−3	2	

Source: UEFA
Rules for classification: Group stage tiebreakers
(H) Hosts

====== UEFA Euro 2020 fixtures and results ======
15 June 2021 Group F	France	1–0	Germany	Munich, Germany
21:00 (21:00 UTC+2)	Hummels 20' (o.g.)	Report		Stadium: Allianz Arena; Attendance: 13,000; Referee: Carlos del Cerro Grande (Spain)

19 June 2021 Group F	Portugal	2–4	Germany	Munich, Germany
18:00 (18:00 UTC+2)	Ronaldo 15'; Jota 67'	Report	Dias 35' (o.g.); Guerreiro 39' (o.g.); Havertz 51'; Gosens 60'	Stadium: Allianz Arena; Attendance: 12,926; Referee: Anthony Taylor (England)

23 June 2021 Group F	Germany	2–2	Hungary	Munich, Germany
21:00 (21:00 UTC+2)	Havertz 66'; Goretzka 84'	Report	Ád. Szalai 11'; Schäfer 68'	Stadium: Allianz Arena; Attendance: 12,413; Referee: Sergei Karasev (Russia)

29 June 2021 Round of 16	England	2–0	Germany	London, England
18:00 (17:00 UTC+1)	Sterling 75'; Kane 86'	Report		Stadium: Wembley Stadium; Attendance: 41,973; Referee: Danny Makkelie (Netherlands)

==== 2022 FIFA World Cup qualification ====
===== 2022 FIFA World Cup qualification Group J =====
Pos	Team	Pld	W	D	L	GF	GA	GD	Pts	Qualification	Germany	North Macedonia	Romania	Armenia	Iceland	Liechtenstein
1	Germany	10	9	0	1	36	4	+32	27	Qualification for 2022 FIFA World Cup	—	1–2	2–1	6–0	3–0	9–0
2	North Macedonia	10	5	3	2	23	11	+12	18	Advance to play-offs	0–4	—	0–0	0–0	3–1	5–0
3	Romania	10	5	2	3	13	8	+5	17		0–1	3–2	—	1–0	0–0	2–0
4	Armenia	10	3	3	4	9	20	−11	12		1–4	0–5	3–2	—	2–0	1–1
5	Iceland	10	2	3	5	12	18	−6	9		0–4	2–2	0–2	1–1	—	4–0
6	Liechtenstein	10	0	1	9	2	34	−32	1		0–2	0–4	0–2	0–1	1–4	—

Source: FIFA, UEFA
Rules for classification: Tiebreakers

===== 2022 FIFA World Cup qualification fixtures and results =====
25 March 2021 2022 FIFA World Cup qualification	Germany	3–0	Iceland	Duisburg
20:45 (20:45 UTC+1)	Goretzka 3'; Havertz 7'; Gündoğan 56'	Report		Stadium: Schauinsland-Reisen-Arena; Attendance: 0 (Note: Due to the COVID-19 pandemic in Europe, the match was played behind closed doors.); Referee: Srđan Jovanović (Serbia)

28 March 2021 2022 FIFA World Cup qualification	Romania	0–1	Germany	Bucharest
20:45 (21:45 UTC+3)		Report	Gnabry 17'	Stadium: Arena Națională; Attendance: 0 Referee: Clément Turpin (France)

31 March 2021 2022 FIFA World Cup qualification	Germany	1–2	North Macedonia	Duisburg
20:45 (20:45 UTC+2)	Gündoğan 63' (pen.)	Report	Pandev 45+2'; Elmas 85'	Stadium: Schauinsland-Reisen-Arena; Attendance: 0 Referee: Sergei Karasev (Russia)

==== Friendly matches ====
7 October 2020 Friendly	Germany	3–3	Turkey	Cologne
20:45 UTC+2	Draxler 45+1'; Neuhaus 58'; Waldschmidt 81'	Report	Tufan 49'; Karaca 67'; Karaman 90+4'	Stadium: RheinEnergieStadion; Attendance: 300; Referee: Benoît Bastien (France)

11 November 2020 Friendly	Germany	1–0	Czech Republic	Leipzig
20:45 (20:45 UTC+1)	Waldschmidt 13'	Report		Stadium: Red Bull Arena; Attendance: 0 Referee: Andris Treimanis (Latvia)

2 June 2021 Friendly	Germany	1–1	Denmark	Innsbruck, Austria
21:00 (21:00 UTC+2)	Neuhaus 48'	Report	Poulsen 71'	Stadium: Tivoli Stadion Tirol; Referee: Julian Weinberger (Austria)

7 June 2021 Friendly	Germany	7–1	Latvia	Düsseldorf
20:45 (20:45 UTC+2)	Gosens 19'; Gündoğan 21'; Müller 27'; Ozols 39' (o.g.); Gnabry 45'; Werner 50'; Sané 76'	Report	Saveljevs 75'	Stadium: Merkur Spiel-Arena; Referee: Nikola Dabanović (Montenegro)

=== Germany Olympic football team ===
==== Summer Olympics ====
Due to the COVID-19 pandemic, the games have been postponed to the summer of 2021, from 22 July to 7 August. However, their official name remains 2020 Summer Olympics.

=== Germany women's national football team ===
==== UEFA Women's Euro 2022 qualifying ====
===== UEFA Women's Euro 2022 qualifying Group I =====
Pos	Team	Pld	W	D	L	GF	GA	GD	Pts	Qualification	Germany	Ukraine	Ireland	Greece	Montenegro
1	Germany	8	8	0	0	46	1	+45	24	Final tournament	—	8–0	3–0	6–0	10–0
2	Ukraine	8	5	0	3	16	21	−5	15	Play-offs	0–8	—	1–0	4–0	2–1
3	Republic of Ireland	8	4	1	3	11	10	+1	13		1–3	3–2	—	1–0	2–0
4	Greece	8	2	1	5	6	21	−15	7		0–5	0–4	1–1	—	1–0
5	Montenegro	8	0	0	8	2	28	−26	0		0–3	1–3	0–3	0–4	—

Source: UEFA
Rules for classification: Tiebreakers

===== UEFA Women's Euro 2021 qualifying fixtures and results =====
19 September 2020 UEFA Women's Euro 2022 qualifying	Germany	3–0	Republic of Ireland	Essen
14:00 (14:00 UTC+2)	Hegering 8'; Marozsán 38'; Schüller 41'	Report		Stadium: Stadion Essen; Referee: Monika Mularczyk (Poland)
Note: The match was originally scheduled for 11 April 2020, 16:00, to be played at Preußenstadion in Münster, but was postponed due to the COVID-19 pandemic in Germany. It was played behind closed doors.

22 September 2020 UEFA Women's Euro 2022 qualifying	Montenegro	0–3	Germany	Podgorica
16:07 (16:07 UTC+2)		Report	Freigang 3'; Leupolz 45+2'; Lohmann 59'	Stadium: Podgorica City Stadium; Referee: Ainara Andrea Acevedo Dudley (Spain)
Note: The match was originally scheduled for 14 April 2020, 16:10, but was postponed due to the COVID-19 pandemic in Germany. It was played behind closed doors.

27 November 2020 UEFA Women's Euro 2022 qualifying	Germany	6–0	Greece	Ingolstadt
16:00 (16:00 UTC+1)	Hegering 17'; Freigang 21', 39', 45'; Dallmann 72'; Krumbiegel 90+2'	Report		Stadium: Audi Sportpark; Attendance: 0 Referee: Marta Frías Acedo (Spain)
Note: The match was originally scheduled for 19 September 2020, but was postponed due to the COVID-19 pandemic in Germany.

1 December 2020 UEFA Women's Euro 2022 qualifying	Republic of Ireland	1–3	Germany	Dublin
18:00 (17:00 UTC±0)	McCabe 45' (pen.)	Report	Magull 21' (pen.); Waßmuth 29', 85'	Stadium: Tallaght Stadium; Attendance: 0 Referee: Sara Persson (Sweden)
Note: The match was originally scheduled for 22 September 2020, but was postponed due to the COVID-19 pandemic in Germany.

==== Friendly matches ====
27 October 2020 Friendly	Germany	Cancelled	England	Wiesbaden
16:00 (16:00 UTC+1)		Report		Stadium: Brita-Arena
Note: The match was cancelled on 25 October 2020 due to a positive COVID-19 test by an English official.

21 February 2021 Three Nations. One Goal	Germany	2–0	Belgium	Aachen
18:00 (18:00 UTC+1)	Huth 2'; Schüller 55'	Report		Stadium: New Tivoli; Attendance: 0 Referee: Lizzy van der Helm (Netherlands)

24 February 2021 Three Nations. One Goal	Netherlands	2–1	Germany	Venlo
18:30 (18:30 UTC+1)	Groenen 16'; Van de Donk 60'	Report	Freigang 44'	Stadium: De Koel; Attendance: 0 Referee: Viki De Cremer (Belgium)

10 April 2021 Friendly	Germany	5–2	Australia	Wiesbaden
16:10 (16:10 UTC+2)	Nüsken 11'; Hendrich 48'; Brand 62'; Freigang 64'; Dallmann 90+1'	Report	Gielnik 82', 90+2'	Stadium: Brita-Arena; Attendance: 0 Referee: Marta Frías Acedo (Spain)

13 April 2021 Friendly	Germany	3–1	Norway	Wiesbaden
16:00 (16:00 UTC+2)	Freigang 8'; Dallmann 17'; Krumbiegel 62'	Report	Reiten 4'	Stadium: Brita-Arena; Attendance: 0 Referee: Désirée Grundbacher (Switzerland)

10 June 2021 Friendly	France	1–0	Germany	Strasbourg
21:10 (21:10 UTC+2)	Dali 30'	Report		Stadium: Stade de la Meinau; Attendance: 5,000; Referee: Ivana Martinčić (Croatia)

15 June 2021 Friendly	Germany	0–0	Chile	Offenbach
15:00 (15:00 UTC+2)		Report		Stadium: Sparda-Bank-Hessen-Stadion; Attendance: 1,000; Referee: Maria Sole Caputi (Italy)

== League season ==
=== Men ===
==== Bundesliga ====
===== Bundesliga standings =====
Pos	Team	Pld	W	D	L	GF	GA	GD	Pts	Qualification or relegation
1	Bayern Munich (C)	34	24	6	4	99	44	+55	78	Qualification for the Champions League group stage
2	RB Leipzig	34	19	8	7	60	32	+28	65	Qualification for the Champions League group stage
3	Borussia Dortmund	34	20	4	10	75	46	+29	64	Qualification for the Champions League group stage
4	VfL Wolfsburg	34	17	10	7	61	37	+24	61	Qualification for the Champions League group stage
5	Eintracht Frankfurt	34	16	12	6	69	53	+16	60	Qualification for the Europa League group stage (Note: Since the winners of the 2020–21 DFB-Pokal, Borussia Dortmund, qualified for the Champions League based on league position, the Europa League group stage spot was passed to the sixth-placed team, and the Europa Conference League play-off round spot was passed to the seventh-placed team.)
6	Bayer Leverkusen	34	14	10	10	53	39	+14	52	Qualification for the Europa League group stage
7	Union Berlin	34	12	14	8	50	43	+7	50	Qualification for the Europa Conference League play-off round
8	Borussia Mönchengladbach	34	13	10	11	64	56	+8	49	
9	VfB Stuttgart	34	12	9	13	56	55	+1	45	
10	SC Freiburg	34	12	9	13	52	52	0	45	
11	1899 Hoffenheim	34	11	10	13	52	54	−2	43	
12	Mainz 05	34	10	9	15	39	56	−17	39	
13	FC Augsburg	34	10	6	18	36	54	−18	36	
14	Hertha BSC	34	8	11	15	41	52	−11	35	
15	Arminia Bielefeld	34	9	8	17	26	52	−26	35	
16	1. FC Köln (O)	34	8	9	17	34	60	−26	33	Qualification for the relegation play-offs
17	Werder Bremen (R)	34	7	10	17	36	57	−21	31	Relegation to 2. Bundesliga
18	Schalke 04 (R)	34	3	7	24	25	86	−61	16	Relegation to 2. Bundesliga

Source: DFB
Rules for classification: 1) Points; 2) Goal difference; 3) Goals scored; 4) Head-to-head results; 5) Head-to-head away goals scored; 6) Away goals scored; 7) Play-off.
(C) Champions; (O) Play-off winners; (R) Relegated

==== 2. Bundesliga ====
===== 2. Bundesliga standings =====
Pos	Team	Pld	W	D	L	GF	GA	GD	Pts	Qualification or relegation
1	VfL Bochum (C, P)	34	21	4	9	66	39	+27	67	Promotion to Bundesliga
2	Greuther Fürth (P)	34	18	10	6	69	44	+25	64	Promotion to Bundesliga
3	Holstein Kiel	34	18	8	8	57	35	+22	62	Qualification for promotion play-offs
4	Hamburger SV	34	16	10	8	71	44	+27	58	
5	Fortuna Düsseldorf	34	16	8	10	55	46	+9	56	
6	Karlsruher SC	34	14	10	10	51	44	+7	52	
7	Darmstadt 98	34	15	6	13	63	55	+8	51	
8	1. FC Heidenheim	34	15	6	13	49	49	0	51	
9	SC Paderborn	34	12	11	11	53	45	+8	47	
10	FC St. Pauli	34	13	8	13	51	56	−5	47	
11	1. FC Nürnberg	34	11	11	12	46	51	−5	44	
12	Erzgebirge Aue	34	12	8	14	44	53	−9	44	
13	Hannover 96	34	12	6	16	53	51	+2	42	
14	Jahn Regensburg	34	9	11	14	37	50	−13	38	
15	SV Sandhausen	34	10	4	20	41	60	−19	34	
16	VfL Osnabrück (R)	34	9	6	19	35	58	−23	33	Qualification for relegation play-offs
17	Eintracht Braunschweig (R)	34	7	10	17	30	59	−29	31	Relegation to 3. Liga
18	Würzburger Kickers (R)	34	6	7	21	37	69	−32	25	Relegation to 3. Liga

Source: DFB
Rules for classification: 1) Points; 2) Goal difference; 3) Goals scored; 4) Head-to-head points; 5) Head-to-head goal difference; 6) Head-to-head away goals scored; 7) Away goals scored; 8) Play-off.
(C) Champions; (P) Promoted; (R) Relegated

==== 3. Liga ====
===== 3. Liga standings =====
Pos	Team	Pld	W	D	L	GF	GA	GD	Pts	Qualification or relegation
1	Dynamo Dresden (C, P)	38	23	6	9	61	29	+32	75	Promotion to 2. Bundesliga and qualification for DFB-Pokal
2	Hansa Rostock (P)	38	20	11	7	52	33	+19	71	Promotion to 2. Bundesliga and qualification for DFB-Pokal
3	FC Ingolstadt (O, P)	38	20	11	7	56	40	+16	71	Qualification for promotion play-offs and DFB-Pokal
4	1860 Munich	38	18	12	8	69	35	+34	66	Qualification for DFB-Pokal
5	1. FC Saarbrücken	38	16	11	11	66	51	+15	59	
6	Wehen Wiesbaden	38	15	11	12	57	53	+4	56	
7	SC Verl	38	14	13	11	66	55	+11	55	
8	Waldhof Mannheim	38	13	13	12	50	55	−5	52	
9	Hallescher FC	38	14	10	14	51	58	−7	52	
10	FSV Zwickau	38	13	12	13	46	45	+1	51	
11	1. FC Magdeburg	38	14	9	15	42	45	−3	51	
12	Viktoria Köln	38	13	12	13	52	59	−7	51	
13	Türkgücü München	38	12	11	15	45	55	−10	47	
14	1. FC Kaiserslautern	38	8	19	11	47	52	−5	43	
15	MSV Duisburg	38	11	10	17	52	67	−15	43	
16	KFC Uerdingen (Note: KFC Uerdingen were deducted three points, after they filed for insolvency.) (R)	38	11	11	16	38	50	−12	41	Relegation to Regionalliga (Note: KFC Uerdingen did not obtain a license for the next season and was therefore relegated, sparing SV Meppen from relegation.)
17	SV Meppen	38	12	5	21	37	61	−24	41	
18	Bayern Munich II (Note: Reserve teams are ineligible for promotion or DFB-Pokal qualification.) (R)	38	8	13	17	47	58	−11	37	Relegation to Regionalliga
19	VfB Lübeck (R)	38	8	11	19	41	57	−16	35	Relegation to Regionalliga
20	SpVgg Unterhaching (R)	38	9	5	24	40	57	−17	32	Relegation to Regionalliga

Source: DFB
Rules for classification: 1) Points; 2) Goal difference; 3) Goals scored; 4) Head-to-head results; 5) Head-to-head away goals scored; 6) Away goals scored; 7) Play-off.
(C) Champions; (O) Play-off winners; (P) Promoted; (R) Relegated

==== DFB-Pokal ====
===== Final =====
13 May 2021
20:45 CEST

RB Leipzig	1–4	Borussia Dortmund
Olmo 71'	Report	Sancho 5', 45+1'; Haaland 28', 87'

Olympiastadion, Berlin
Attendance: 0
Referee: Felix Brych (Munich)

==== DFL-Supercup ====
30 September 2020
20:30 CEST

Bayern Munich	3–2	Borussia Dortmund
Tolisso 18'; Müller 32'; Kimmich 82'	Report	Brandt 39'; Haaland 55'

Allianz Arena, Munich
Attendance: 0 (Note: The match was played behind closed doors due to the COVID-19 pandemic in Germany.)
Referee: Bibiana Steinhaus (Langenhagen)

=== Women ===
==== Frauen-Bundesliga ====
===== Frauen-Bundesliga standings =====
Pos	Team	Pld	W	D	L	GF	GA	GD	Pts	Qualification or relegation
1	Bayern Munich (C)	22	20	1	1	82	9	+73	61	Qualification for Champions League group stage
2	VfL Wolfsburg	22	19	2	1	71	17	+54	59	Qualification for Champions League second round
3	1899 Hoffenheim	22	14	2	6	54	23	+31	44	Qualification for Champions League first round
4	Turbine Potsdam	22	12	3	7	41	36	+5	39	
5	Bayer Leverkusen	22	10	3	9	32	39	−7	33	
6	Eintracht Frankfurt	22	9	3	10	43	29	+14	30	
7	SC Freiburg	22	9	3	10	30	35	−5	30	
8	SGS Essen	22	7	4	11	30	37	−7	25	
9	Werder Bremen	22	6	1	15	23	67	−44	19	
10	SC Sand	22	5	3	14	21	53	−32	18	
11	SV Meppen (R)	22	3	5	14	16	52	−36	14	Relegation to 2. Bundesliga
12	MSV Duisburg (R)	22	1	4	17	15	61	−46	7	Relegation to 2. Bundesliga

Source: DFB
Rules for classification: 1) Points; 2) Goal difference; 3) Goals scored; 4) Head-to-head points; 5) Head-to-head goal difference; 6) Head-to-head goals scored; 7) Head-to-head away goals scored; 8) Away goals scored; 9) Play-off.
(C) Champions; (R) Relegated

==== 2. Frauen-Bundesliga ====
===== 2. Frauen-Bundesliga North standings =====
Pos	Team	Pld	W	D	L	GF	GA	GD	Pts	Promotion, qualification or relegation
1	Carl Zeiss Jena (C, P)	16	10	5	1	29	11	+18	35	Promotion to Bundesliga
2	FSV Gütersloh	16	10	3	3	37	18	+19	33	
3	RB Leipzig	16	8	2	6	32	30	+2	26	
4	Borussia Bocholt	16	7	4	5	27	31	−4	25	
5	VfL Wolfsburg II (Note: Reserve teams cannot compete in the Frauen-Bundesliga and are therefore ineligible for promotion.)	16	6	4	6	26	19	+7	22	
6	Borussia Mönchengladbach (R)	16	6	3	7	22	24	−2	21	Qualification for relegation play-offs
7	Turbine Potsdam II (R)	16	5	5	6	27	26	+1	20	Relegation to Regionalliga
8	Arminia Bielefeld (R)	16	3	2	11	21	32	−11	11	Relegation to Regionalliga
9	SpVg Berghofen (R)	16	2	2	12	8	38	−30	8	Relegation to Regionalliga
10	BV Cloppenburg (Note: BV Cloppenburg withdrew its women's team after the club's bankruptcy.) (R)	0	0	0	0	0	0	0	0	Withdrawn

Source: DFB
Rules for classification: 1) Points; 2) Goal difference; 3) Goals scored; 4) Head-to-head points; 5) Head-to-head goal difference; 6) Head-to-head goals scored; 7) Head-to-head away goals scored; 8) Away goals scored; 9) Play-off.
(C) Champions; (P) Promoted; (R) Relegated

===== 2. Frauen-Bundesliga South standings =====
Pos	Team	Pld	W	D	L	GF	GA	GD	Pts	Promotion, qualification or relegation
1	1. FC Köln (C, P)	16	15	1	0	49	10	+39	46	Promotion to Bundesliga
2	Bayern Munich II (Note: Reserve teams cannot compete in the Frauen-Bundesliga and are therefore ineligible for promotion.)	16	8	3	5	30	20	+10	27	
3	SG Andernach	16	9	0	7	34	27	+7	27	
4	FC Ingolstadt	16	7	5	4	30	24	+6	26	
5	Eintracht Frankfurt II	16	8	1	7	30	22	+8	25	
6	1899 Hoffenheim II (O)	16	6	5	5	36	22	+14	23	Qualification for relegation play-offs
7	1. FC Saarbrücken (R)	16	4	5	7	27	36	−9	17	Relegation to Regionalliga
8	Würzburger Kickers (R)	16	3	2	11	19	35	−16	11	Relegation to Regionalliga
9	1. FFC 08 Niederkirchen (R)	16	0	2	14	4	63	−59	2	Relegation to Regionalliga

Source: DFB
Rules for classification: 1) Points; 2) Goal difference; 3) Goals scored; 4) Head-to-head points; 5) Head-to-head goal difference; 6) Head-to-head goals scored; 7) Head-to-head away goals scored; 8) Away goals scored; 9) Play-off.
(C) Champions; (O) Play-off winners; (P) Promoted; (R) Relegated

==== DFB-Pokal Frauen ====
===== Final =====
30 May 2021
16:00

Eintracht Frankfurt	0–1 (a.e.t.)	VfL Wolfsburg
	Report	Pajor 118'

RheinEnergieStadion, Cologne
Attendance: 0
Referee: Mirka Derlin

== German clubs in Europe ==
=== UEFA Super Cup ===
24 September 2020
21:00 UTC+2

Bayern Munich (Germany)	2–1 (a.e.t.)	(Spain) Sevilla
Goretzka 34'; Martínez 104'	Report	Ocampos 13' (pen.)

Puskás Aréna, Budapest
Attendance: 15,180
Referee: Anthony Taylor (England)

=== UEFA Champions League ===
==== Group stage ====
===== Group A =====
Pos	Team	Pld	W	D	L	GF	GA	GD	Pts	Qualification	BAY	ATM	SAL	LMO
1	(Germany) Bayern Munich	6	5	1	0	18	5	+13	16	Advance to knockout phase	—	4–0	3–1	2–0
2	(Spain) Atlético Madrid	6	2	3	1	7	8	−1	9	Advance to knockout phase	1–1	—	3–2	0–0
3	(Austria) Red Bull Salzburg	6	1	1	4	10	17	−7	4	Transfer to Europa League	2–6	0–2	—	2–2
4	(Russia) Lokomotiv Moscow	6	0	3	3	5	10	−5	3		1–2	1–1	1–3	—

Source: UEFA

===== Group B =====
Pos	Team	Pld	W	D	L	GF	GA	GD	Pts	Qualification	RMA	BMG	SHK	INT
1	(Spain) Real Madrid	6	3	1	2	11	9	+2	10	Advance to knockout phase	—	2–0	2–3	3–2
2	(Germany) Borussia Mönchengladbach	6	2	2	2	16	9	+7	8 (Note: Head-to-head points: Borussia Mönchengladbach 6, Shakhtar Donetsk 0.)	Advance to knockout phase	2–2	—	4–0	2–3
3	(Ukraine) Shakhtar Donetsk	6	2	2	2	5	12	−7	8	Transfer to Europa League	2–0	0–6	—	0–0
4	(Italy) Inter Milan	6	1	3	2	7	9	−2	6		0–2	2–2	0–0	—

Source: UEFA

===== Group F =====
Pos	Team	Pld	W	D	L	GF	GA	GD	Pts	Qualification	DOR	LAZ	BRU	ZEN
1	(Germany) Borussia Dortmund	6	4	1	1	12	5	+7	13	Advance to knockout phase	—	1–1	3–0	2–0
2	(Italy) Lazio	6	2	4	0	11	7	+4	10	Advance to knockout phase	3–1	—	2–2	3–1
3	(Belgium) Club Brugge	6	2	2	2	8	10	−2	8	Transfer to Europa League	0–3	1–1	—	3–0
4	(Russia) Zenit Saint Petersburg	6	0	1	5	4	13	−9	1		1–2	1–1	1–2	—

Source: UEFA

===== Group H =====
Pos	Team	Pld	W	D	L	GF	GA	GD	Pts	Qualification	PAR	RBL	MUN	IBS
1	(France) Paris Saint-Germain	6	4	0	2	13	6	+7	12 (Note: Tied on head-to-head points (3). Head-to-head away goals: Paris Saint-Germain 1, RB Leipzig 0.)	Advance to knockout phase	—	1–0	1–2	5–1
2	(Germany) RB Leipzig	6	4	0	2	11	12	−1	12	Advance to knockout phase	2–1	—	3–2	2–0
3	(England) Manchester United	6	3	0	3	15	10	+5	9	Transfer to Europa League	1–3	5–0	—	4–1
4	(Turkey) İstanbul Başakşehir	6	1	0	5	7	18	−11	3		0–2	3–4	2–1	—

Source: UEFA

==== Knockout phase ====
===== Round of 16 =====
Team 1	Agg.	Team 2	1st leg	2nd leg
Borussia Mönchengladbach (Germany)	0–4	(England) Manchester City	0–2	0–2
Lazio (Italy)	2–6	(Germany) Bayern Munich	1–4	1–2
RB Leipzig (Germany)	0–4	(England) Liverpool	0–2	0–2
Sevilla (Spain)	4–5	(Germany) Borussia Dortmund	2–3	2–2

===== Quarter-finals =====
Team 1	Agg.	Team 2	1st leg	2nd leg
Manchester City (England)	4–2	(Germany) Borussia Dortmund	2–1	2–1
Bayern Munich (Germany)	3–3 (a)	(France) Paris Saint-Germain	2–3	1–0

=== UEFA Europa League ===
==== Qualifying phase and play-off round ====
===== Second qualifying round =====
Team 1	Score	Team 2
Kukësi (Albania)	0–4	(Germany) VfL Wolfsburg

===== Third qualifying round =====
Team 1	Score	Team 2
VfL Wolfsburg (Germany)	2–0	(Ukraine) Desna Chernihiv

===== Play-off round =====
Team 1	Score	Team 2
AEK Athens (Greece)	2–1	(Germany) VfL Wolfsburg

==== Group stage ====
===== Group C =====
Pos	Team	Pld	W	D	L	GF	GA	GD	Pts	Qualification	LEV	SLP	HBS	NCE
1	(Germany) Bayer Leverkusen	6	5	0	1	21	8	+13	15	Advance to knockout phase	—	4–0	4–1	6–2
2	(Czech Republic) Slavia Prague	6	4	0	2	11	10	+1	12	Advance to knockout phase	1–0	—	3–0	3–2
3	(Israel) Hapoel Be'er Sheva	6	2	0	4	7	13	−6	6		2–4	3–1	—	1–0
4	(France) Nice	6	1	0	5	8	16	−8	3		2–3	1–3	1–0	—

Source: UEFA

===== Group L =====
Pos	Team	Pld	W	D	L	GF	GA	GD	Pts	Qualification	HOF	ZVE	LIB	GNT
1	(Germany) TSG Hoffenheim	6	5	1	0	17	2	+15	16	Advance to knockout phase	—	2–0	5–0	4–1
2	(Serbia) Red Star Belgrade	6	3	2	1	9	4	+5	11	Advance to knockout phase	0–0	—	5–1	2–1
3	(Czech Republic) Slovan Liberec	6	2	1	3	4	13	−9	7		0–2	0–0	—	1–0
4	(Belgium) Gent	6	0	0	6	4	15	−11	0		1–4	0–2	1–2	—

Source: UEFA

==== Knockout phase ====
===== Round of 32 =====
Team 1	Agg.	Team 2	1st leg	2nd leg
Young Boys (Switzerland)	6–3	(Germany) Bayer Leverkusen	4–3	2–0
Molde (Norway)	5–3	(Germany) 1899 Hoffenheim	3–3	2–0

=== UEFA Women's Champions League ===
==== Knockout phase ====
===== Round of 32 =====
Team 1	Agg.	Team 2	1st leg	2nd leg
Spartak Subotica (Serbia)	0–7	(Germany) VfL Wolfsburg	0–5	0–2
Ajax (Netherlands)	1–6	(Germany) Bayern Munich	1–3	0–3

===== Round of 16 =====
Team 1	Agg.	Team 2	1st leg	2nd leg
VfL Wolfsburg (Germany)	4–0	(Norway) LSK Kvinner	2–0	2–0
BIIK Kazygurt (Kazakhstan)	1–9	(Germany) Bayern Munich	1–6	0–3

===== Quarter-finals =====
Team 1	Agg.	Team 2	1st leg	2nd leg
Bayern Munich (Germany)	4–0	(Sweden) Rosengård	3–0	1–0
Chelsea (England)	5–1	(Germany) VfL Wolfsburg	2–1	3–0

===== Semi-finals =====
Team 1	Agg.	Team 2	1st leg	2nd leg
Bayern Munich (Germany)	3–5	(England) Chelsea	2–1	1–4
