= 2020–21 2. Frauen-Bundesliga =

2. Frauen-Bundesliga
- Season: 2020–21
- Dates: 4 October 2020 – 6 June 2021

The 2020–21 2. Frauen-Bundesliga was the 17th season of Germany's second-tier women's football league. The season began on 4 October 2020 and concluded on 6 June 2021. The champions of both divisions were promoted to the Frauen-Bundesliga, while the bottom three teams were relegated to the Frauen-Regionalliga.

This season initially consisted of 19 teams, as there was no relegation from the previous season, due to the COVID-19 pandemic in Germany. USV Jena joined forces with FC Carl Zeiss Jena and competed under their name. In a conference with the clubs, two systems were put to a vote. The majority of the clubs decided on one option, which is to re-divide the league into Nord and Süd. To get back to the desired strength of 14 teams and a single-league, there were six relegated teams: the last three in the ten-team division and last two teams from the nine-team division. The last team was determined between the teams who finished seventh in each division. Before the season, BV Cloppenburg withdrew its women's team from the 2. Bundesliga after bankruptcy and was thus relegated, reducing the league to 18 teams. On 3 November 2020, the league was paused. In late February 2021, it was announced that the season would continue on 21 March.

The fixtures were announced on 4 August 2020.

== Effects of the COVID-19 pandemic ==
On 31 August 2020, the DFB Executive Committee decided to allow for the use of five substitutions in matches during the 2020–21 season, which was implemented in other DFB competitions at the end of the previous season to lessen the impact of fixture congestion caused by the COVID-19 pandemic. The use of five substitutes, based on the decision of competition organisers, had been extended by IFAB until 2021.

== Teams ==
Locations of teams in the 2020–21 2. Frauen-Bundesliga

=== Team changes ===
Entering league		Exiting league	
Promoted from 2019–20 Regionalliga	Relegated from 2019–20 Bundesliga	Promoted to 2020–21 Bundesliga	Relegated to 2020–21 Regionalliga
RB Leipzig; 1. FFC 08 Niederkirchen; Borussia Bocholt; SpVg Berghofen; Würzburger Kickers (previously SC Würzburg)	1. FC Köln; Carl Zeiss Jena (previously FF USV Jena)	Werder Bremen; SV Meppen	None as the season was cancelled.

== North ==
Nord
- Dates: 4 October 2020 – 23 May 2021
- Champions: Carl Zeiss Jena
- Promoted: Carl Zeiss Jena
- Relegated: Turbine Potsdam II; Arminia Bielefeld; SpVg Berghofen; BV Cloppenburg
- Matches played: 72
- Goals scored: 229 (3.18 per match)
- Top goalscorer: Sarah Abu-Sabbah (11 goals)
- Biggest home win: Leipzig 5–1 Bocholt; Gütersloh 5–1 Bielefeld; Potsdam II 5–1 Berghofen; Mönchengladbach 4–0 Berghofen; Wolfsburg II 4–0 Berghofen
- Biggest away win: Gütersloh 0–5 Mönchengladbach; Berghofen 1–6 Potsdam II
- Highest scoring: Leipzig 3–5 Bielefeld
- Attendance: 2,852 (40 per match) (Note: Due to the COVID-19 pandemic in Germany, each local health department allowed a different number of spectators.)

=== Stadiums ===
Team	Home city	Home ground	Capacity
SpVg Berghofen	Dortmund	Sportplatz im Schwerter Wald	
Arminia Bielefeld	Bielefeld	EDImedienArena	2,500
Borussia Bocholt	Bocholt	In der Hardt	1,500
~~BV Cloppenburg~~	~~Cloppenburg~~	~~PK Sportpark~~	~~5,001~~
FSV Gütersloh	Gütersloh	Tönnies-Arena	4,252
Carl Zeiss Jena	Jena	Ernst-Abbe-Sportfeld	10,800
RB Leipzig	Leipzig	Sportanlage Gontardweg	1,300
Borussia Mönchengladbach	Mönchengladbach	Grenzlandstadion	10,000
Turbine Potsdam II	Potsdam	Sportforum Waldstadt	5,000
VfL Wolfsburg II	Wolfsburg	AOK Stadion	5,200

=== League table ===
Pos	Team	Pld	W	D	L	GF	GA	GD	Pts	Promotion, qualification or relegation
1	Carl Zeiss Jena (C, P)	16	10	5	1	29	11	+18	35	Promotion to Bundesliga
2	FSV Gütersloh	16	10	3	3	37	18	+19	33	
3	RB Leipzig	16	8	2	6	32	30	+2	26	
4	Borussia Bocholt	16	7	4	5	27	31	−4	25	
5	VfL Wolfsburg II (Note: Reserve teams cannot compete in the Frauen-Bundesliga and are therefore ineligible for promotion.)	16	6	4	6	26	19	+7	22	
6	Borussia Mönchengladbach (R)	16	6	3	7	22	24	−2	21	Qualification for relegation play-offs
7	Turbine Potsdam II (R)	16	5	5	6	27	26	+1	20	Relegation to Regionalliga
8	Arminia Bielefeld (R)	16	3	2	11	21	32	−11	11	Relegation to Regionalliga
9	SpVg Berghofen (R)	16	2	2	12	8	38	−30	8	Relegation to Regionalliga
10	BV Cloppenburg (Note: BV Cloppenburg withdrew its women's team after the club's bankruptcy.) (R)	0	0	0	0	0	0	0	0	Withdrawn

Source: DFB
Rules for classification: 1) Points; 2) Goal difference; 3) Goals scored; 4) Head-to-head points; 5) Head-to-head goal difference; 6) Head-to-head goals scored; 7) Head-to-head away goals scored; 8) Away goals scored; 9) Play-off.
(C) Champions; (P) Promoted; (R) Relegated

=== Results ===
Home \ Away	BER	BIE	BOC	CLO	GÜT	JEN	LEI	MÖN	PO2	WO2
SpVg Berghofen	—	1–1	0–1	—	1–0	0–2	1–2	0–2	1–6	0–2
Arminia Bielefeld	4–0	—	1–3	—	0–1	0–1	2–4	0–1	1–3	0–3
Borussia Bocholt	2–0	2–1	—	—	1–5	3–3	3–1	2–2	2–2	1–0
BV Cloppenburg	—	—	—	—	—	—	—	—	—	—
FSV Gütersloh	3–0	5–1	3–1	—	—	1–1	4–1	0–5	1–1	4–1
Carl Zeiss Jena	0–1	2–1	3–1	—	0–0	—	3–1	3–0	1–1	2–2
RB Leipzig	3–1	3–5	5–1	—	0–2	0–2	—	2–1	1–0	1–1
Borussia Mönchengladbach	4–0	0–4	1–1	—	0–3	0–2	1–4	—	2–0	0–1
Turbine Potsdam II	5–1	3–0	3–0	—	1–4	0–3	1–1	1–1	—	0–2
VfL Wolfsburg II	1–1	0–0	1–3	—	4–1	0–1	2–3	1–2	5–0	—

Source: DFB
Legend: Blue = home team win; Yellow = draw; Red = away team win.

=== Top scorers ===
Rank	Player	Club	Goals
1	(Jordan) Sarah Abu-Sabbah	Borussia Mönchengladbach	11
2	(Germany) Annalena Rieke	FSV Gütersloh	10
3	(Germany) Sarah Grünheid	Arminia Bielefeld	9
4	(Germany) Vanessa Fudalla	RB Leipzig	6
4	(Germany) Nelly Juckel	Carl Zeiss Jena	6
6	(Germany) Romy Baraniak	VfL Wolfsburg II	5
6	(United States) Christina Edwards	Borussia Bocholt	5
6	(Germany) Natasha Kowalski	VfL Wolfsburg II	5
6	(Germany) Christin Meyer	Carl Zeiss Jena	5
6	(Germany) Anja Mittag	RB Leipzig	5
6	(Germany) Marlene Müller	RB Leipzig	5
6	(Germany) Jolina Opladen	Borussia Bocholt	5
6	(Norway) Karina Sævik	VfL Wolfsburg II	5
6	(Germany) Rita Schumacher	VfL Wolfsburg II	5

== South ==
Süd
- Dates: 4 October 2020 – 23 May 2021
- Champions: 1. FC Köln
- Promoted: 1. FC Köln
- Relegated: 1. FC Saarbrücken; Würzburger Kickers; 1. FFC 08 Niederkirchen
- Matches played: 72
- Goals scored: 259 (3.6 per match)
- Top goalscorer: Vanessa Leimenstoll (14 goals)
- Biggest home win: Hoffenheim II 9–0 Niederkirchen
- Biggest away win: Niederkirchen 0–5 Hoffenheim II; Niederkirchen 0–5 Munich II
- Highest scoring: Köln 7–2 Würzburg; Hoffenheim II 9–0 Niederkirchen
- Attendance: 2,095 (29 per match)

=== Stadiums ===
Team	Home city	Home ground	Capacity
SG Andernach	Andernach	Stadionstraße	
Eintracht Frankfurt II	Frankfurt	Stadion am Brentanobad	5,200
1899 Hoffenheim II	Sinsheim	Ensinger-Stadion	4,000
FC Ingolstadt	Ingolstadt	ESV-Stadion	11,481
1. FC Köln	Cologne	Südstadion	11,748
Bayern Munich II	Aschheim	Sportpark Aschheim	3,000
1. FFC 08 Niederkirchen	Niederkirchen	Sportgelände Nachtweide	2,000
1. FC Saarbrücken	Saarbrücken	Kieselhumes	12,000
Würzburger Kickers	Würzburg		

=== League table ===
Pos	Team	Pld	W	D	L	GF	GA	GD	Pts	Promotion, qualification or relegation
1	1. FC Köln (C, P)	16	15	1	0	49	10	+39	46	Promotion to Bundesliga
2	Bayern Munich II (Note: Reserve teams cannot compete in the Frauen-Bundesliga and are therefore ineligible for promotion.)	16	8	3	5	30	20	+10	27	
3	SG Andernach	16	9	0	7	34	27	+7	27	
4	FC Ingolstadt	16	7	5	4	30	24	+6	26	
5	Eintracht Frankfurt II	16	8	1	7	30	22	+8	25	
6	1899 Hoffenheim II (O)	16	6	5	5	36	22	+14	23	Qualification for relegation play-offs
7	1. FC Saarbrücken (R)	16	4	5	7	27	36	−9	17	Relegation to Regionalliga
8	Würzburger Kickers (R)	16	3	2	11	19	35	−16	11	Relegation to Regionalliga
9	1. FFC 08 Niederkirchen (R)	16	0	2	14	4	63	−59	2	Relegation to Regionalliga

Source: DFB
Rules for classification: 1) Points; 2) Goal difference; 3) Goals scored; 4) Head-to-head points; 5) Head-to-head goal difference; 6) Head-to-head goals scored; 7) Head-to-head away goals scored; 8) Away goals scored; 9) Play-off.
(C) Champions; (O) Play-off winners; (P) Promoted; (R) Relegated

=== Results ===
Home \ Away	AND	FR2	HO2	ING	KÖL	MU2	NIE	SAA	WÜR
SG Andernach	—	1–2	3–2	1–3	1–3	3–1	5–0	6–0	3–1
Eintracht Frankfurt II	6–0	—	1–2	1–2	0–3	2–1	2–0	3–0	1–2
1899 Hoffenheim II	1–2	2–2	—	3–3	0–1	0–2	9–0	1–1	2–1
FC Ingolstadt	2–1	2–0	1–1	—	0–4	2–2	6–0	3–3	3–0
1. FC Köln	2–0	1–0	2–1	4–0	—	3–0	6–1	2–1	7–2
Bayern Munich II	1–2	2–0	1–1	2–0	1–3	—	0–0	3–1	3–1
1. FFC 08 Niederkirchen	0–2	1–5	0–5	0–3	0–4	0–5	—	1–1	1–3
1. FC Saarbrücken	3–2	2–3	1–3	2–0	3–3	2–4	2–0	—	2–2
Würzburger Kickers	0–2	1–2	1–3	0–0	0–1	0–2	5–0	0–3	—

Source: DFB
Legend: Blue = home team win; Yellow = draw; Red = away team win.

=== Top scorers ===
Rank	Player	Club	Goals
1	(Germany) Vanessa Leimenstoll	1899 Hoffenheim II	14
2	(Germany) Mandy Islacker	1. FC Köln	12
2	(Germany) Ramona Maier	FC Ingolstadt	12
4	(Republic of Ireland) Amber Barrett	1. FC Köln	10
5	(Germany) Johanna Berg	Eintracht Frankfurt II	9
6	(Israel) Sharon Beck	1. FC Köln	8
6	(Montenegro) Medina Dešić	Würzburger Kickers	8
6	(Germany) Antonia Hornberg	SG Andernach	8
9	(Germany) Nadine Anstatt	1. FC Saarbrücken	7
9	(Germany) Annika Wohner	Bayern Munich II	7

== Relegation play-offs ==
The relegation play-offs took place on 30 May and 6 June 2021.

=== Overview ===
Team 1	Agg.	Team 2	1st leg	2nd leg
Borussia Mönchengladbach	1–3	1899 Hoffenheim II	0–1	1–2

=== Matches ===
20 June 2021
11:00

Borussia Mönchengladbach	0–1	1899 Hoffenheim II
	Report	Görlitz 73'

Grenzlandstadion, Mönchengladbach
Attendance: 100
Referee: Annika Paszehr
27 June 2021
11:00

1899 Hoffenheim II	2–1	Borussia Mönchengladbach
	Report

Ensinger Stadion, Sinsheim

1899 Hoffenheim II won 3–1 on aggregate.
