= List of Arizona State University athletes =

Arizona State University (ASU) has graduated a number of athletes. This includes graduates, non-graduate former students and current students of ASU who are notable for their achievements within athletics, sometimes before or after their time at ASU. Other alumni, including non-playing coaches and athletic administrators, can be found in the list of Arizona State University alumni. The first recorded sporting event in the history of what was originally the Tempe Normal School was a baseball game played in 1891; the first football team was fielded in 1896. Since 1947, ASU's athletic teams have been known as the Sun Devils after previously being known as the Bulldogs and unofficially as the Normals or Owls. The university is a member of the Big 12 Conference and fields teams in 26 varsity sports, comprising some 600 student-athletes.

ASU has historically produced notable athletes in baseball, football, swimming, track and field, and wrestling, among other sports. As of 2024, ASU is second among all NCAA universities with 117 alumni who have played in Major League Baseball (MLB) and has the most inductees into the College Baseball Hall of Fame, and more than 200 Sun Devil student-athletes have competed in the Olympic Games, winning a total of 66 medals.

Well-known American football athletes include six members of the Pro Football Hall of Fame, including Curley Culp and Randall McDaniel, as well as Pat Tillman. ASU's contributions to MLB include Barry Bonds, Dustin Pedroia, Reggie Jackson and Rick Monday. Other notables include basketball players Eddie House and James Harden among 30 all-time National Basketball Association (NBA) players, swimmers Léon Marchand and Melissa Belote, and golfers including six-time major tournament winner Phil Mickelson and two-time winner Jon Rahm. Other ASU athletes have played professionally in the National Hockey League (NHL), Women's National Basketball Association (WNBA), National Women's Soccer League, Ultimate Fighting Championship (UFC), PGA Tour and LPGA Tour, as well as internationally.

For size reasons, this list contains six partial lists covering baseball, basketball, football, golf, swim and dive, and track and field.

== Softball ==
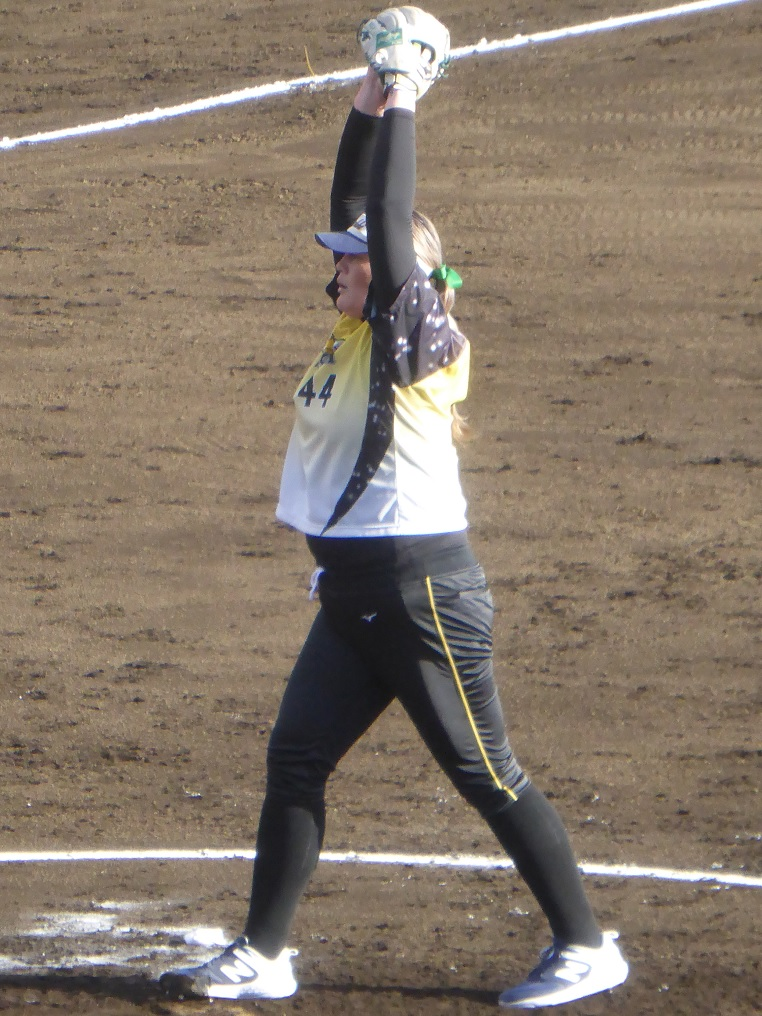
Dallas Escobedo

Softball
Name	Years played at ASU	Notes	Ref.
Katie Burkhart	2005–2008	Pitcher, played in National Pro Fastpitch	
Kaitlin Cochran	2006–2009	2011 gold medalist at the Pan American Games, played in National Pro Fastpitch	
Krista Donnenwirth	2008–2011		
Dallas Escobedo	2011–2014	Pitcher; later a graduate manager for ASU softball, represented Mexico at the 2020 Summer Olympics	
Stacey Farnworth		Represented Greece at the 2004 Summer Olympics	
Danielle Gibson	2018		
Chelsea Gonzales	2014–2017		
Giselle Juarez	2017–2018		
Tammy Lohmann	1993–1997	Head softball coach, San José State	
Sashel Palacios	2014–2017		

== Soccer ==
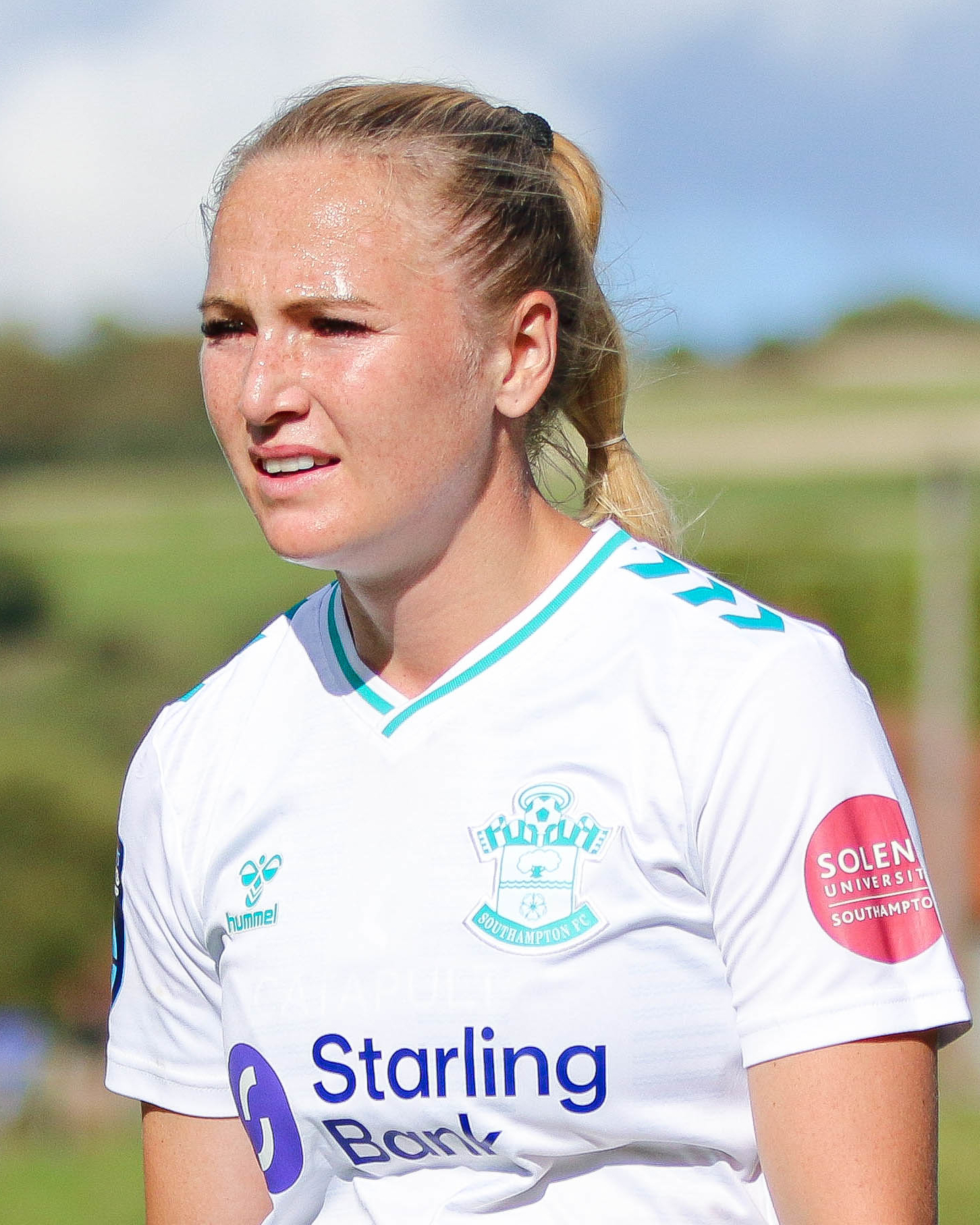
Jemma Purfield

Soccer
Name	Years played at ASU	Notes	Ref.
McKenzie Berryhill	2012–2015	Played in the National Women's Soccer League and the Norwegian Toppserien	
Liz Bogus	2002–2004	Played in Women's Professional Soccer and the National Women's Soccer League	
Nina Brüggemann	2012		
Lieske Carleer	2019–2023	Played in the Vrouwen Eredivisie and Frauen-Bundesliga and for the Netherlands women's national team	
Alexia Delgado	2018–2022	Played in Liga MX Femenil and for the Mexico women's national team	
Eva van Deursen	2018–2022		
Nicole Douglas	2018–2022	First Sun Devil soccer player to be an All-American since 2002; played in the NWSL and USL Super League	
Christina Edwards	2016–2019		
Cali Farquharson	2012–2015	Played in the NWSL	
Jayda Hylton-Pelaia	2021	Jamaican international	
Vildan Kardeşler	2021	Turkish international	
Amy LePeilbet	2000–2003	Played in Women's Professional Soccer and the National Women's Soccer League; 2011 Women's World Cup champion; 2012 Olympian representing the U.S.; interim coach of the Utah Royals	
Manya Makoski	2002–2005		
Jemma Purfield	2017–2018	Played professionally in England	
Gabi Rennie	2022–2023	2024 Olympian representing New Zealand	
Marleen Schimmer	2018–2019	Played professionally in the U.S. and Germany	
Kylla Sjoman	2005–2008		
Cori Sullivan	2018–2021		
Tatum Thomason	2025		
Stacey Tullock	1998–2000		
Jazmine Wilkinson	2020–2022		

== Tennis ==
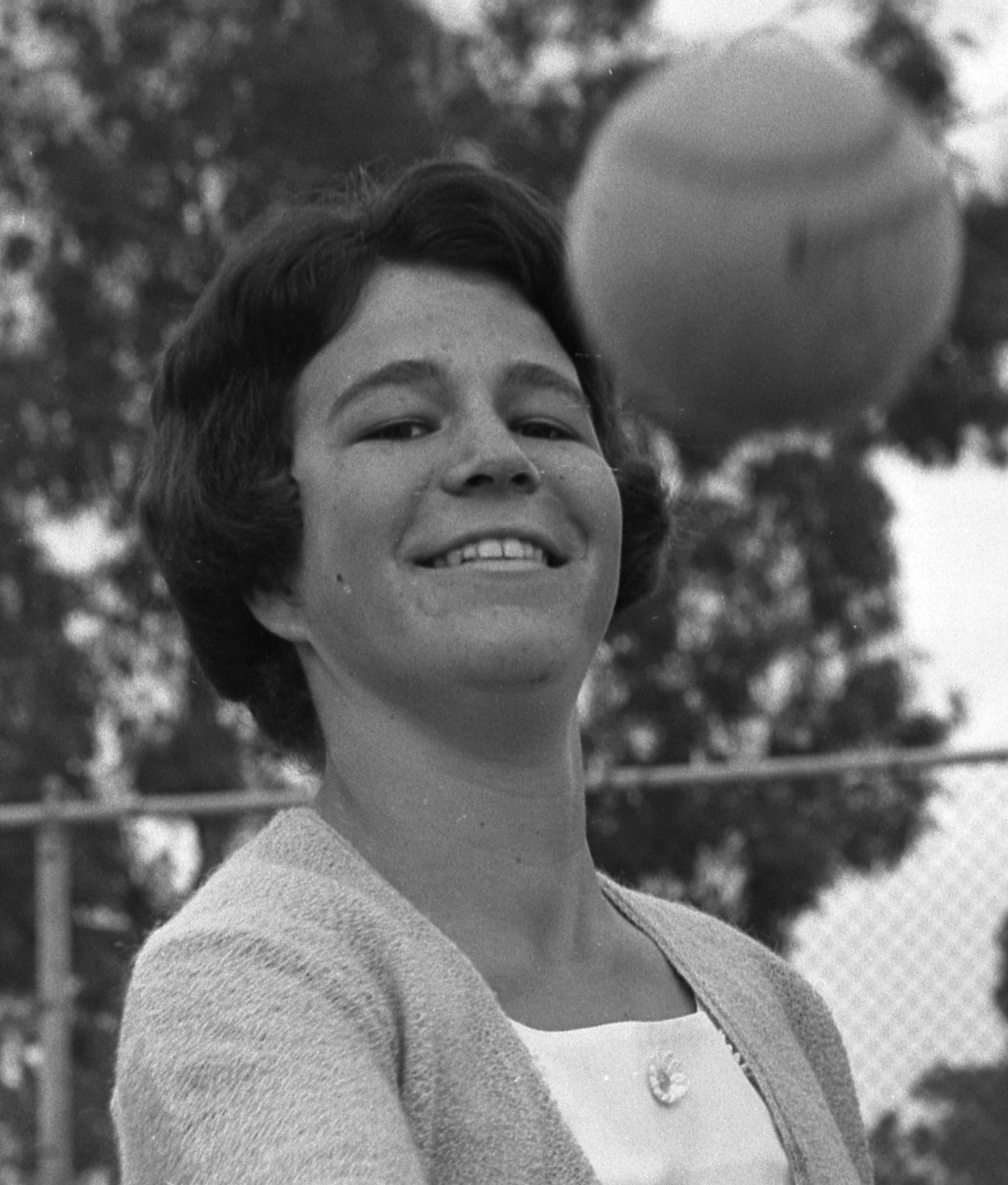
Peggy Michel

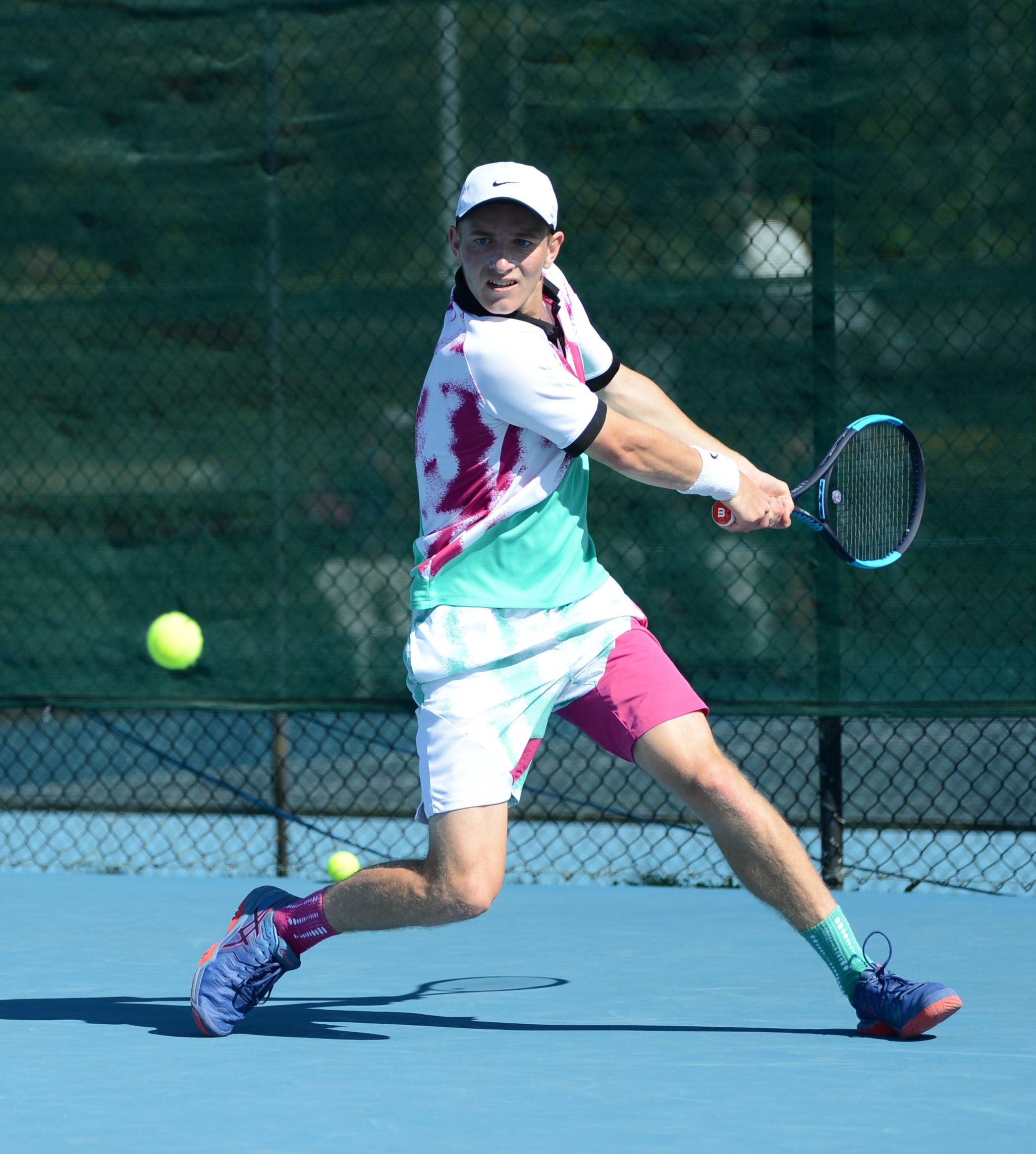
George Stoupe

Tennis
Name	Years played at ASU	Notes	Ref.
Carol Baily		Professional tennis player	
Óscar Bustos		Chilean tennis player	
Jacqueline Cako	2010–2013	Professional tennis player	
Murphy Cassone	2021–2024	Professional tennis player	
Andrew Colombo		NCAA doubles champion at Auburn University before transferring to ASU	
Gary Donnelly	1982–1983	Professional tennis player	
Adria Engel	1999–2002	Professional tennis player	
Chelsea Fontenel	2022–2024	Professional tennis player	
Nicole Fossa Huergo	2016–2018	Professional tennis player	
Laura Glitz		Professional tennis player	
Brian Gyetko		1992 Olympian representing Canada	
Benjamin Hannestad	2017–2018		
Ilze Hattingh	2017–2021	Professional tennis player	
Glen Holroyd		Professional tennis player	
Allyson Ingram		Professional tennis player	
Dave Kanter	1971–1974	Professional tennis player	
Matt Klinger	1999–2002	Professional tennis player	
Desirae Krawczyk		2024 Olympian representing the U.S.	
Dora Krstulović	2001–2003	Professional tennis player	
Gustavo Marcaccio		Professional tennis player and coach	
Ross Matheson	1991–1992	Professional tennis player	
Alexandra Osborne	2014–2017	Professional tennis player	
Peggy Michel	1968–1972	Professional tennis player; collegiate doubles champion, 1972	
Todd Nelson		Professional tennis player	
Sheri Norris	1984–1986		
Karin Palme	1997–2001	Professional tennis player	
Paulina Peisachov	1970	Professional tennis player	
Justin Roberts	2018–2019	Professional tennis player	
Sargis Sargsian	1994–1995	First NCAA men's singles champion in ASU history; three-time Olympian representing Armenia	
Joelle Schad		1996 Olympian representing the Dominican Republic	
Eric Sherbeck		Professional tennis player and coach	
Patrīcija Špaka	2021–2025	Latvian tennis player	
George Stoupe	2019–2022	Professional tennis player	

== Wrestling and combat sports ==
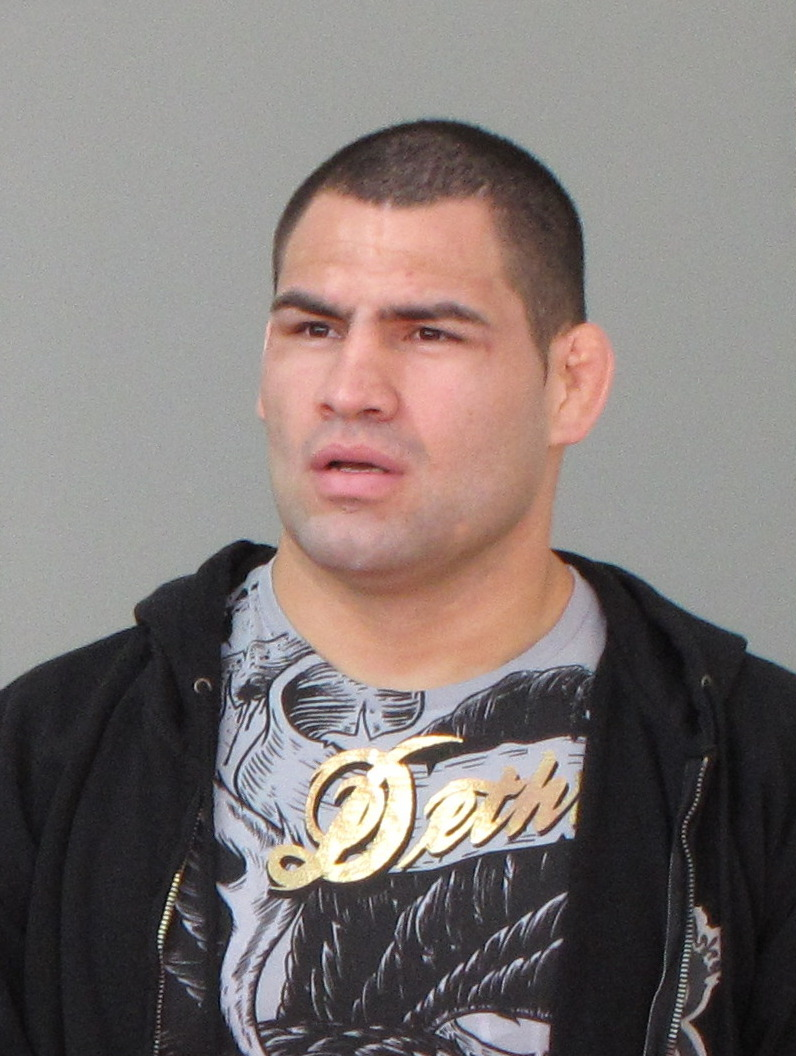
Cain Velasquez

Wrestling and combat sports
Name	Years played at ASU	Notes	Ref.
Eric Albarracin		Served in the U.S. Army; MMA coach	
Ryan Bader	2001–2005	Wrestler and mixed martial arts (MMA) fighter	
Steven Blackford	1998–2001	Three-time All-American	
Kennedy Blades	2022–2024	Freestyle wrestler; competed in the 2024 Summer Olympics	
Gary Bohay		Represented Canada in wrestling at the 1988 Summer Olympics	
Kelsey Campbell		ASU's first female wrestler; represented the U.S. at the 2012 Summer Olympics	
Sullivan Cauley	2014–2017	Wrestler and MMA fighter	
C.B. Dollaway	2004–2005	Wrestler and MMA fighter	
Rob Eiter		Represented the U.S. in wrestling at the 1996 Summer Olympics	
Don Frye	1985–1987	Wrestler and MMA fighter	
Dan Henderson	1993	Represented the U.S. in wrestling at the 1992 and 1996 Summer Olympics	
Barb Honchak	—N/a	MMA fighter	
Bubba Jenkins	2010–2011	2011 national champion at 157 lbs, professional MMA fighter	
Zeke Jones	1987–1990	Represented the U.S. in the 1992 Summer Olympics and served as an Olympic coach in 2004, 2008 and 2012; ASU wrestling head coach since 2014	
Matthew Lopez		Wrestler; professional MMA fighter	
Nicco Montaño	—N/a	Professional MMA fighter	
John Moraga		Wrestler; professional MMA fighter	
Anthony Robles	2008–2011	2011 national champion at 125 lbs, profiled in the 2024 film Unstoppable	
Billy Rosado	1976–1978	Represented the U.S. at the 1976 Summer Olympics	
Frankie Saenz		Wrestler; professional MMA fighter	
Marco Sanchez		Represented the U.S. at the 1996 Summer Olympics	
Townsend Saunders	1989–1990	Represented the U.S. at the 1996 Summer Olympics	
Dan Severn	1977–1980	Wrestler and wrestling coach at ASU; MMA fighter	
Aaron Simpson		MMA fighter; ASU assistant wrestling coach	
Clifford Starks			
James Terry		MMA fighter	
Zahid Valencia	2016–2020	2019 NCAA freestyle champion	
Cain Velasquez	2003–2005	Two-time All-American and MMA fighter; first heavyweight MMA or boxing champion of Mexican-American descent	
Patrick Williams		MMA fighter	

== Other athletics ==
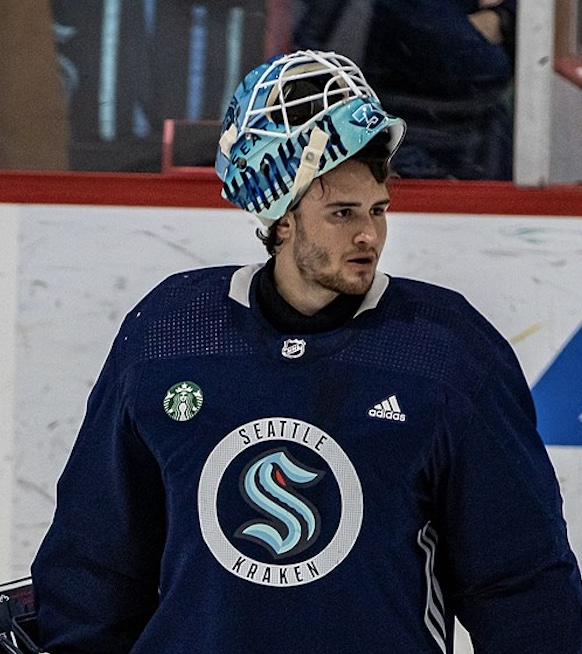
Joey Daccord

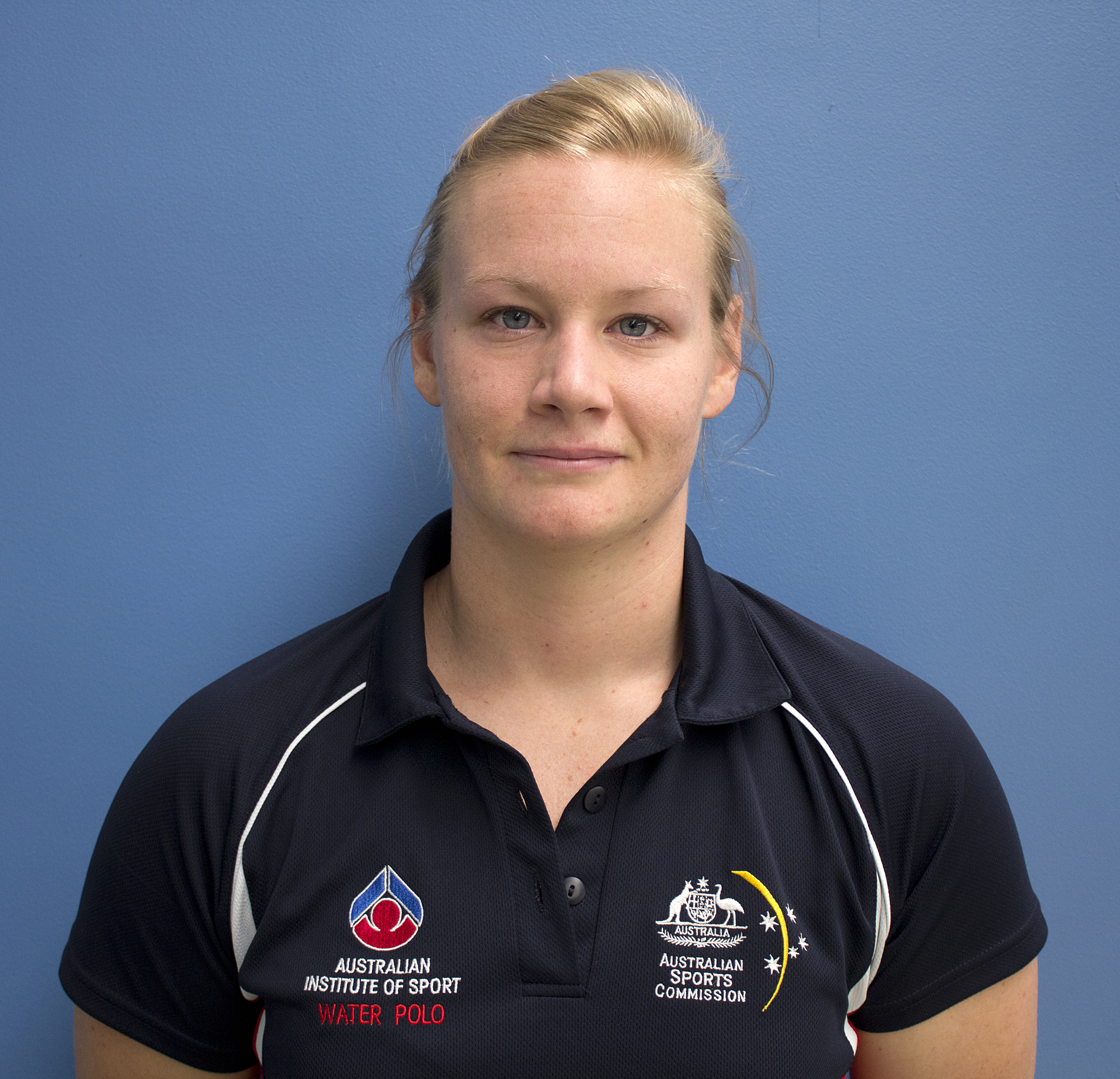
Rowie Webster

Other athletics
Name	Years played at ASU	Notes	Ref.
Judi Adams		Archer; represented the U.S. at the 1996 Summer Olympics	
Jay Barrs	1983–1984	Archer; gold medalist for the U.S. at the 1987 Pan American Games and 1988 Summer Olympics	
Amanda Borden	—N/a	Captain of the 1996 U.S. Olympic gymnastics team; graduated 2003	
Izabella Chiappini		Water polo; represented Brazil at the 2016 Summer Olympics	
Joey Daccord	2016–2019	Hockey goaltender; first ASU hockey player to play in the National Hockey League	
Erin Densham		Triathlete; represented Australia at the 2016 Summer Olympics	
Josh Doan	2021–2023	Hockey forward	
Danna Durante	2002–2005	Gymnast; collegiate coach at Washington, Nebraska, Georgia and North Carolina	
Linda French		Badminton; represented the U.S. at the 1992 and 1996 Summer Olympics	
Ao Gao		Water polo; represented China at the 2008 and 2012 Olympics	
Sean "Sgares" Gares		Professional esports player; known for Counter-Strike	
Christine Garner	1992–1995	Volleyball	
Dan Hayden	1985–1986	Gymnast	
Dennis Hayden	1985–1986	Gymnast	
Hannah Henry	2017–2018	Triathlete	
Justin Huish		Archer; represented the U.S. at the 1996 Summer Olympics	
Chris Jogis	1984–1987	Badminton; three-time national men's doubles and singles champion, four-time All-American; 1992 Olympian representing the U.S.	
Kittia Kennedy	1976–1980	Gymnast; coached Nia Dennis and Gabby Douglas	
Benny Lee		Badminton; represented the U.S. at the 1992 Summer Olympics	
Nelson Lincoln		Sports shooting; 1960 Olympian representing the U.S.	
Richard McKinney	1980–1984	Archer; represented the U.S. at the 1976, 1984 and 1988 Summer Olympics	
Chase McQueen	2018–2020	Triathlete	
Glenn Meyers		Archer; represented the U.S. at the 1984 Summer Olympics	
Ty Murchison	2021–2025	Hockey defenseman	
Brinson Pasichnuk	2017–2020	Hockey defenseman	
Cullen Potter	2024–2025	Hockey forward; highest-drafted ASU hockey player, 32nd overall in the 2025 NHL Draft	
Bente Rogge		Water polo; represented the Netherlands at the 2020 and 2024 Summer Olympics	
Lieke Rogge		Water polo; represented the Netherlands at the 2024 Summer Olympics	
Jenny Rowland		Gymnast	
Leanne Schuster	1991–1994	Volleyball player	
Jay Shi		Sports shooting; 2016 Olympian representing the U.S.	
Artem Shlaine	2024–2025	Ice hockey	
J.C. Trujillo		World-champion bareback bronc rider; 1968 intercollegiate bareback riding champion	
Tammy Webb	1983–1986	Volleyball; represented the U.S. in the 1988, 1992 and 1996 Summer Olympics and won bronze in 1992	
Rowie Webster		Water polo; represented Australia at the 2012 and 2016 Summer Olympics	
Alison Williamson		Archer; represented Great Britain at the 1992, 1996, 2000, 2004, 2008 and 2012 Summer Olympics	
Erica Wilson	2009–2012	Volleyball player	
