= Belgium–Netherlands relations =

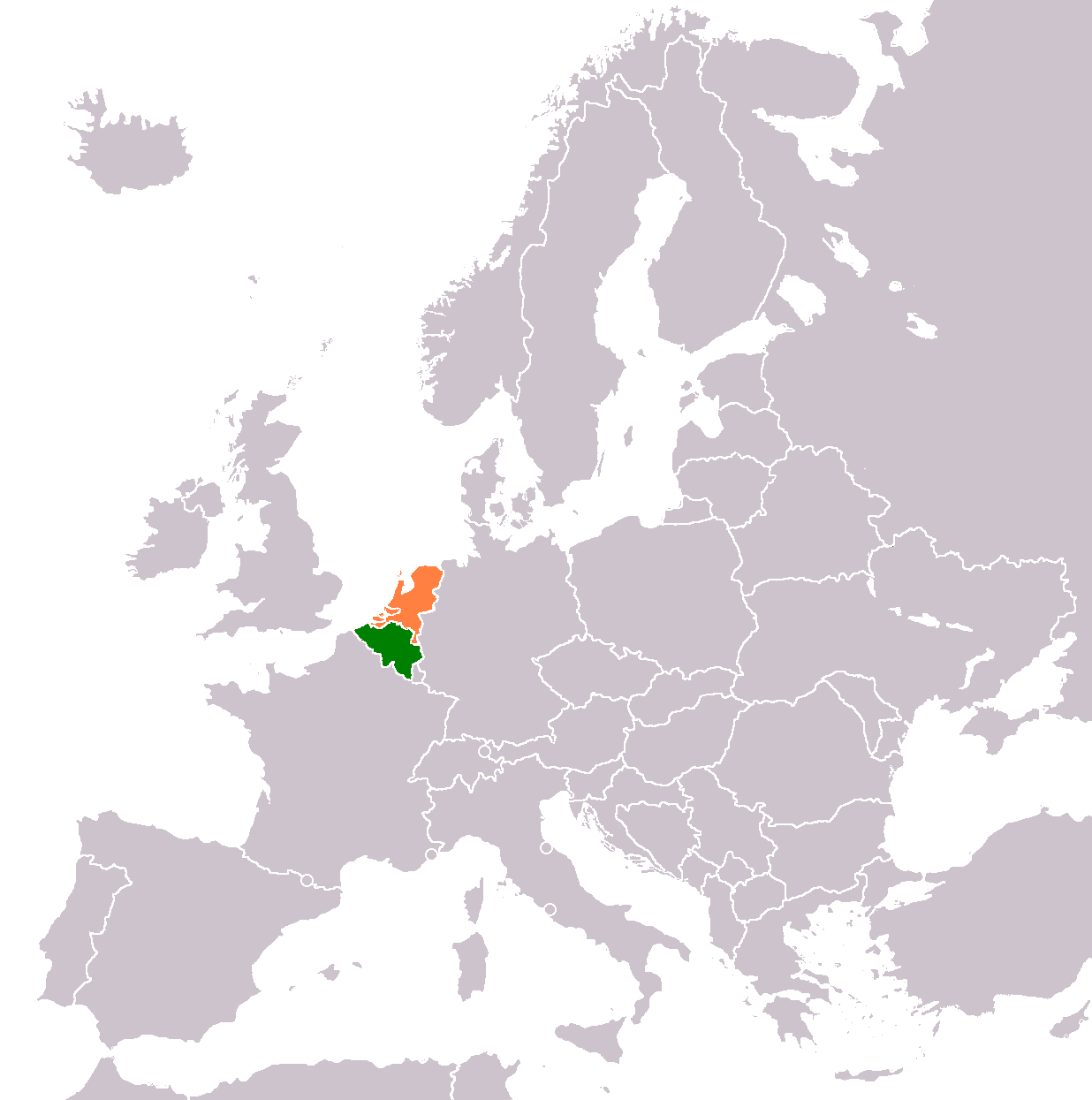
- Belgium: Netherlands

Diplomatic mission
- Embassy of Belgium, The Hague: Embassy of the Netherlands, Brussels

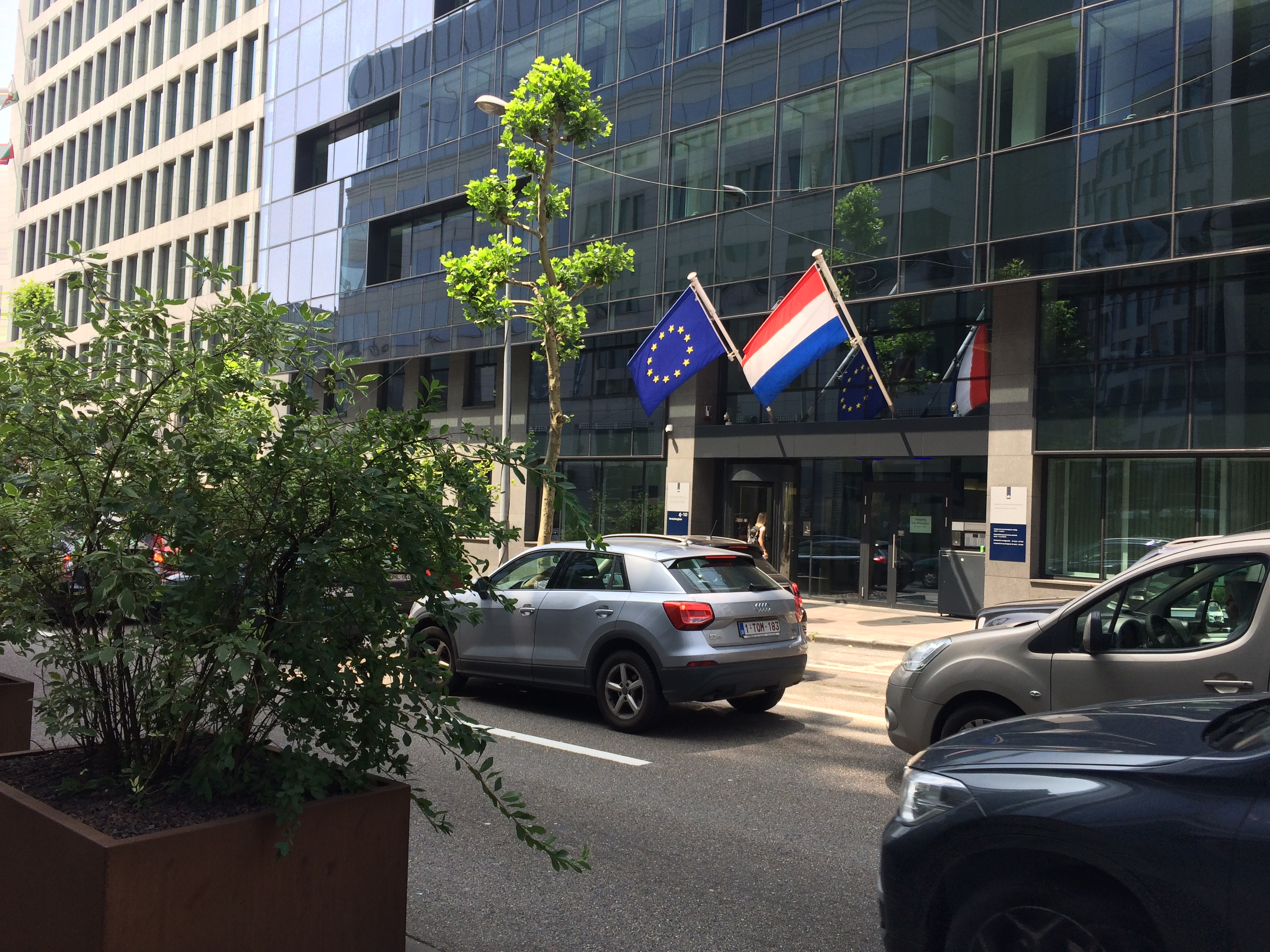
Embassy of the Netherlands, Brussels

Belgium and the Netherlands maintain close bilateral relations, marked by shared history, culture, institutions and language, extensive people-to-people links, aligned security interests, sporting tournaments and vibrant trade and investment cooperation. Both nations are members of the European Union and NATO and, together with Luxembourg, form the Low Countries region and the Benelux economic union. The Dutch colonialism left a lasting institutional and legal footprint on modern Indonesia (Dutch East Indies), while the Belgian administration in Rwanda (part of German East Africa until 1916) and the DR Congo (Belgian Congo) left a legacy of ethnic tension, severe under-preparation for independence, and deep economic exploitation with resources, but neither saw a mass European settlement like South Africa.

== History ==
=== Middle Ages ===
During the Middle Ages, the territories that now comprise Belgium and the Netherlands were part of a patchwork of feudal states in the Low Countries. Despite political fragmentation (with counties and duchies such as Flanders, Brabant, Holland, and others), the region developed dense economic and cultural interconnections. By the 13th century the Low Countries had become one of the most prosperous areas in Europe, rivaling northern Italy in commerce and culture.

These economic networks fostered early ties between the populations of the two regions, long before they became nation-states. Cultural and artistic developments also flowed through the Low Countries – for example, the Duchy of Brabant and County of Flanders were centers of Gothic art and learning that influenced the Dutch-speaking communities further north. By the late Middle Ages, a sense of shared regional identity was growing: the Low Countries were increasingly referred to collectively, and the prosperity of the southern provinces radiated across the whole area, contributing to a degree of unity.

=== Burgundian Netherlands ===
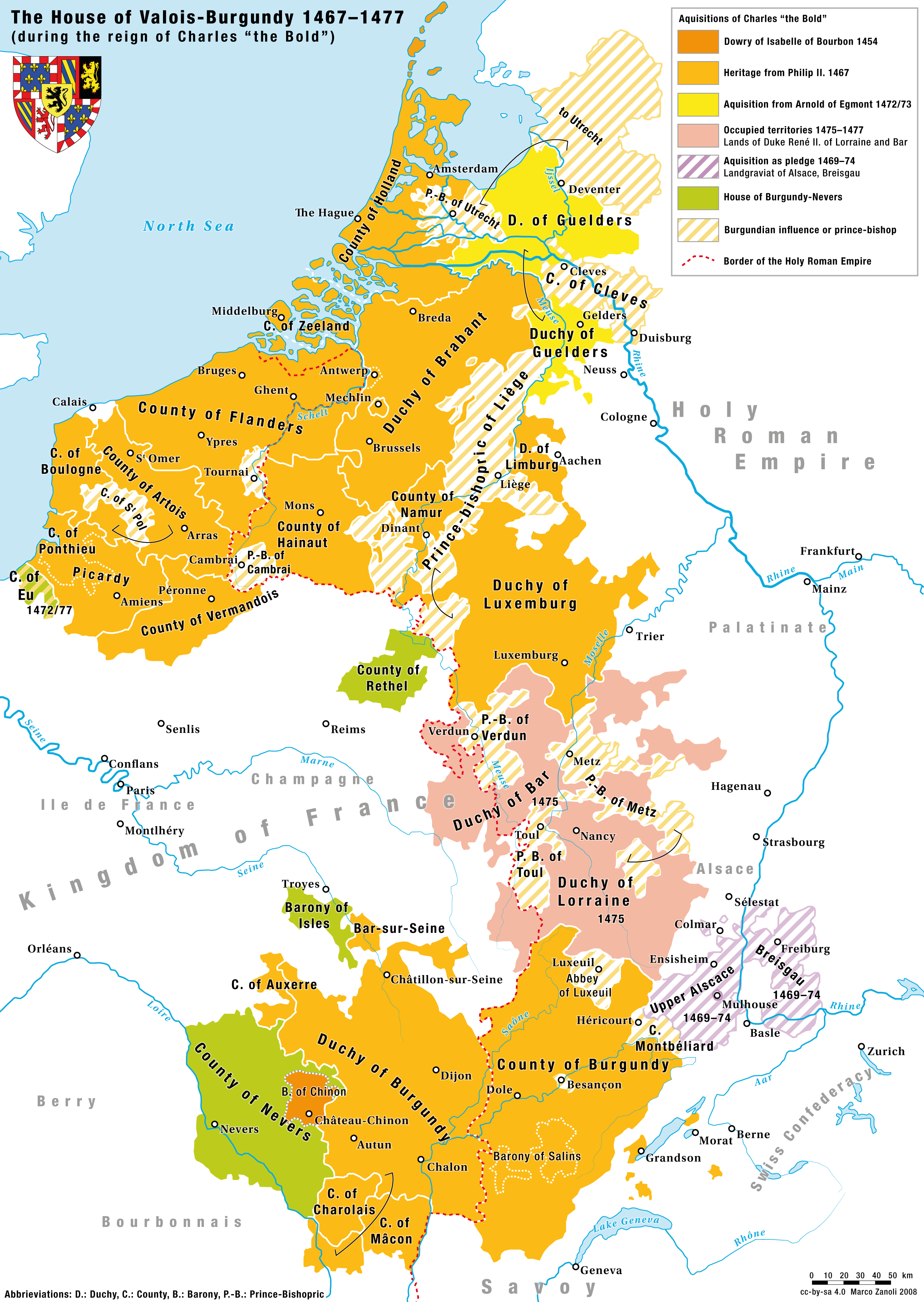
Territories of the house of Valois-Burgundy during the reign of Charles the Bold.

In the 14th and 15th centuries, the Low Countries were gradually consolidated under the rule of the House of Burgundy – a development that significantly shaped relations between the regions that would become Belgium and the Netherlands. Beginning in 1384, the Dukes of Burgundy inherited or acquired many of the Netherlandish territories (including Flanders, Brabant, Holland, Zeeland, and others), bringing them under a single sovereign for the first time. Burgundy’s dominion created a de facto political union often called the Burgundian Netherlands. Duke Philip the Good (reigned 1419–1467) in particular pursued policies of centralization to bind the diverse provinces together. He established an increasingly modern central administration and, in 1464, convened the first Estates General representing all the provincial estates of the Netherlands. Burgundian rule also fostered a shared court culture and political outlook: the ducal court, moving between cities like Bruges, Brussels, and Lille, patronized Flemish and Dutch artisans alike and cultivated a sense of common identity among the nobility.

By the time the Burgundian line ended in 1477, the Low Countries had experienced a taste of integration, with political and economic ties between the provinces (roughly corresponding to modern Belgium, Netherlands, and Luxembourg) stronger than ever before. The notion of the “Low Countries” as a collective entity was reinforced during this era, even as regional particularism persisted.

=== Seventeen Provinces ===
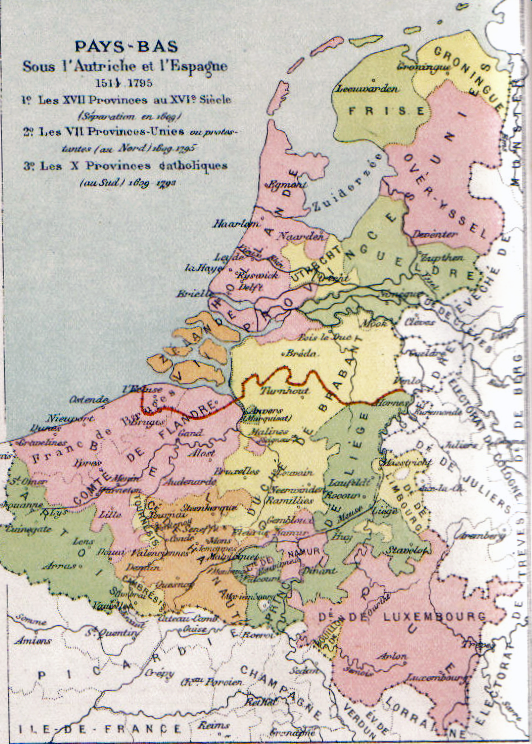
Map of the Seventeen Provinces, 1581 secession outlined in red

In 1482, the Burgundian inheritance in the Low Countries passed to the Habsburgs, and by 1543 Emperor Charles V had united these lands into a personal union known as the Seventeen Provinces. Under Habsburg rule, the Low Countries remained a single politico-administrative unit, and Charles V (a native of Ghent) continued the centralizing policies of his Burgundian predecessors. He established a capital at Brussels and in 1549 promulgated the Pragmatic Sanction, formally declaring the Seventeen Provinces indivisible for inheritance purposes. Despite this unification, significant internal tensions were growing by the mid-16th century. The northern and southern parts of the Seventeen Provinces differed in religion, economy, and political culture, and Habsburg efforts to impose uniform rule increasingly met resistance. The Protestant Reformation had begun to spread in the Low Countries, especially Calvinism in Flanders and Holland, which clashed with the staunch Catholicism of the Habsburg kings. Philip II of Spain (who inherited the provinces from Charles V in 1555) enforced strict Counter-Reformation measures and centralized governance, alienating large segments of the population.

Open unrest exploded in 1566 with the Iconoclastic Fury (Beeldenstorm) – waves of Calvinist mobs attacking Catholic churches and images across Flanders and Brabant. The following repression provoked armed resistance, and in 1568 the Low Countries erupted into open revolt against Spanish rule, beginning the Eighty Years’ War. During this protracted conflict, the once-united Seventeen Provinces split into hostile camps. In 1579 the southern, mostly Catholic provinces (e.g. Artois, Hainaut, and later Brabant and Flanders) formed the Union of Arras, making peace with Spain, while the northern provinces (led by Holland and Zeeland) formed the Union of Utrecht to continue fighting for independence. This effectively drew a line between what would become the Southern Netherlands and the Northern Netherlands (Dutch Republic). The leader of the revolt, William of Orange, and the rebel States-General formally abjured their loyalty to Philip II with the Act of Abjuration in 1581, effectively declaring sovereignty for the United Provinces in the north. The Habsburgs retained the southern provinces, which remained under Spanish sovereignty (often called the Spanish Netherlands). Thus, by the end of the 16th century, the “Seventeen Provinces” were split in two. This division – essentially the birth of an independent Netherlands while the south (broadly corresponding to today’s Belgium) stayed under Habsburg rule. The once-common institutions and close interactions under Burgundy and early Habsburg rule gave way to a political separation that would endure.

=== Dutch Republic ===
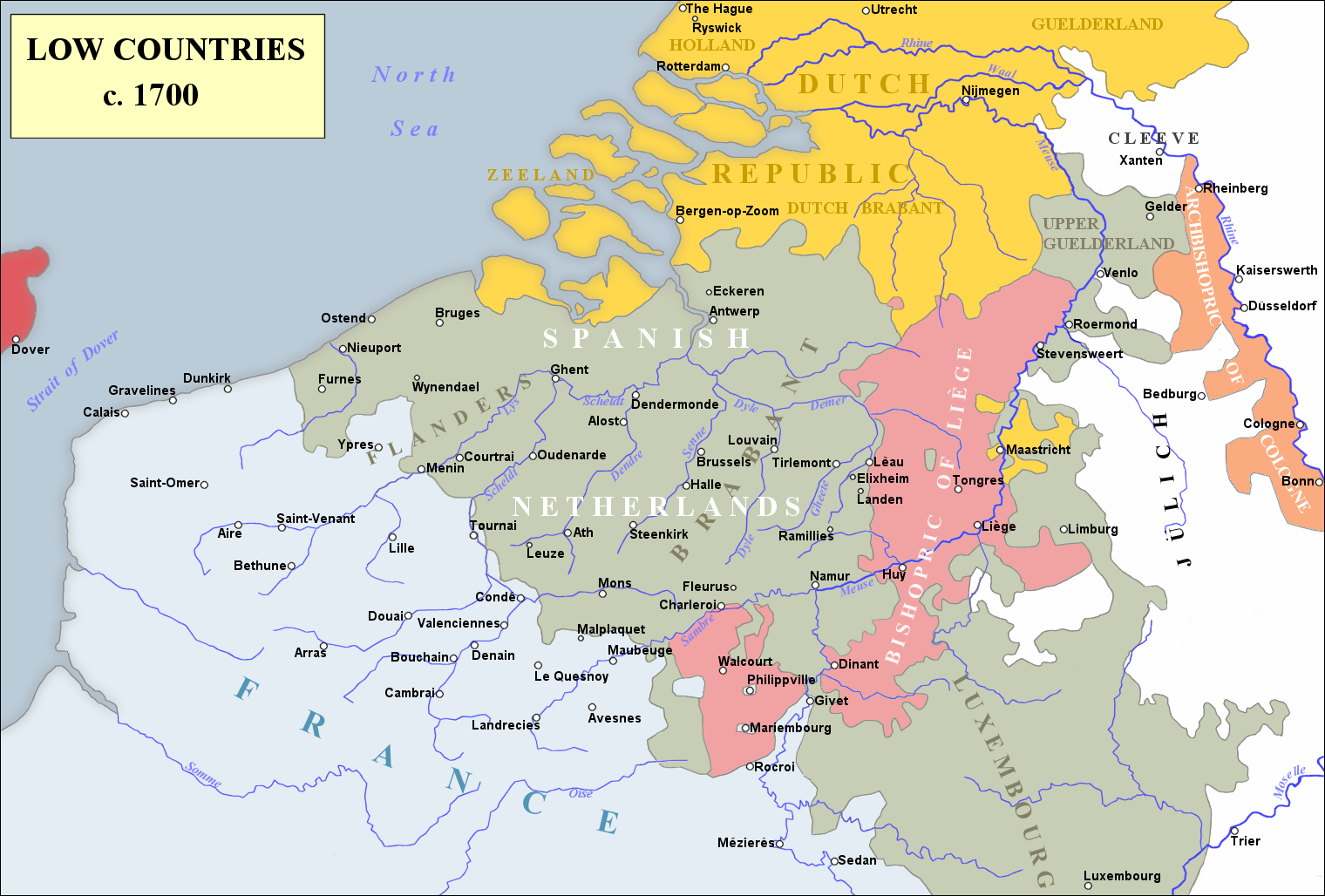
Low Countries (1700)

The Dutch Republic quickly became one of Europe’s leading powers in the 17th century, an era often referred to as the Dutch Golden Age. Now free from Spanish rule, the Protestant north embraced a decentralized, republican form of government dominated by the wealthy bourgeoisie of Holland and Zeeland. Its economy boomed: Amsterdam replaced Antwerp as the premier trade entrepôt of Northern Europe, and the Dutch built a global maritime empire. Crucially, the Dutch drew upon the commercial expertise and capital of many exiled southern Netherlanders (Protestant merchants, artisans, intellectuals) who had fled Spanish reconquest of the south. By mid-17th century, the Dutch Republic dominated carrying trade and finance in Europe, and its urban society flourished culturally (producing figures like Rembrandt and Spinoza).

In stark contrast, the Southern Netherlands (roughly present-day Belgium) underwent a period of relative economic and political decline under continued Habsburg rule. The once-prosperous cities of Flanders and Brabant never fully recovered their former dynamism after the closure of the Scheldt and the loss of so many skilled workers to the north. The 1648 Peace of Westphalia not only recognized Dutch independence but also stipulated that the Scheldt River remain closed to navigation, securing Dutch control of Antwerp’s access to the sea. The Southern Netherlands, predominantly Catholic and still governed by a Spanish-appointed nobility, became an “aristocratic state” with a more traditional, hierarchical society, compared to the Dutch republic. Commerce and innovation lagged behind the north: while the Dutch Republic pioneered capitalism and religious tolerance (attracting entrepreneurs and refugees), the south remained a garrisoned borderland in Europe’s great power struggles.

Bilateral relations between the Dutch Republic and the Southern Netherlands were limited and often defined by conflict or strategic concerns rather than cooperation. The two entities frequently found themselves on opposite sides of 17th-century wars. During the Anglo-Dutch Wars and the wars of Louis XIV of France, the Southern Netherlands (still under Habsburg Spain) was a major battleground – sometimes with tacit Dutch support, since the Protestant Dutch preferred a beleaguered Spanish-controlled Flanders as a buffer against French expansion. The Dutch Republic even undertook to garrison a series of fortresses in the Southern Netherlands after the War of the Spanish Succession: under the Barrier Treaties (1709–1715), the Dutch stationed troops in key border fortresses (like Namur, Tournai, and Ypres) to guard against French attacks.

In 1714, the Southern Netherlands passed from Spanish to Austrian Habsburg control, but this did little to change its subordinate status. The Austrian Netherlands remained largely cut off from the sea trade and was governed by a traditional elite; Emperor Joseph II’s attempted reforms in the 1780s (including an effort in 1784 to reopen the Scheldt) were met with resistance and even a short-lived rebellion in the Brabant Revolution. Meanwhile, the Dutch Republic faced its own challenges in the 18th century – periodic wars with Britain and France and internal political strife – but it maintained its independence until the French Revolutionary forces invaded in 1795. At the close of the 18th century, both north and south fell under French domination (the Dutch Republic was replaced by the Batavian Republic under French influence, and the Austrian Netherlands were annexed directly to revolutionary France in 1795). This tumultuous period set the stage for the next attempt at unification of the two regions under one state after the Napoleonic Wars.

=== United Kingdom of the Netherlands ===
Map of provinces of the United Kingdom of the Netherlands (1815-1830)

After the defeat of Napoleon in 1815, the great powers of Europe undertook a major redrawing of the map at the Congress of Vienna. One result was the decision to reunite the northern and southern Low Countries into a single kingdom. This was done by merging the former Austrian Netherlands (roughly today’s Belgium) with the former United Provinces (the Netherlands) to form the United Kingdom of the Netherlands under King William I of Orange. The great powers saw this as a strategic buffer state to contain France, restoring the Low Countries unity that had existed before 1585. On paper, the reunion made sense: it created a mid-sized kingdom with the economic potential of both the thriving Dutch trading economy and the industrializing regions of Wallonia. In practice, however, the union faced significant difficulties from the outset due to deep-rooted differences between north and south that had developed over centuries of separation. King William I, a Protestant Dutch monarch, attempted to centrally govern this composite state in an authoritarian, paternalistic manner – which quickly alienated many in the south. Southern Catholics resented the king’s control over the Catholic Church and southern liberals disliked the lack of representative government. Another problem was language: William I promoted the Dutch language in Flanders and even in the officially French-speaking administration of Brussels and Wallonia, aiming to make Dutch the unifying language of the kingdom. This policy angered the French-speaking Belgian elite, who saw it as an imposition; it also did little to appease Flemish speakers, since Dutch (as standardized in the Netherlands) was somewhat different from the local Flemish dialects and had long been suppressed in formal domains.

In 1828, southern Catholic conservatives and secular liberals – recognizing a common interest in curbing William’s absolute rule – formed a tactical alliance known as “unionism.” They jointly petitioned the king for governmental reforms, including freedom of the press, religious liberty, and more autonomy for the southern provinces. This was a remarkable development, as it bridged ideological divides (religious vs. secular) in pursuit of what both saw as justice for Belgium. Though their demands were largely ignored by the Dutch government, the alliance set the stage for coordinated action. By 1829 an economic downturn and rising unemployment hit parts of Belgium, fueling frustration. King William I remained largely uncompromising, confident in his policies and backed by the north’s support. This intransigence only convinced southern leaders that more drastic measures might be necessary.

=== Belgian Revolution ===
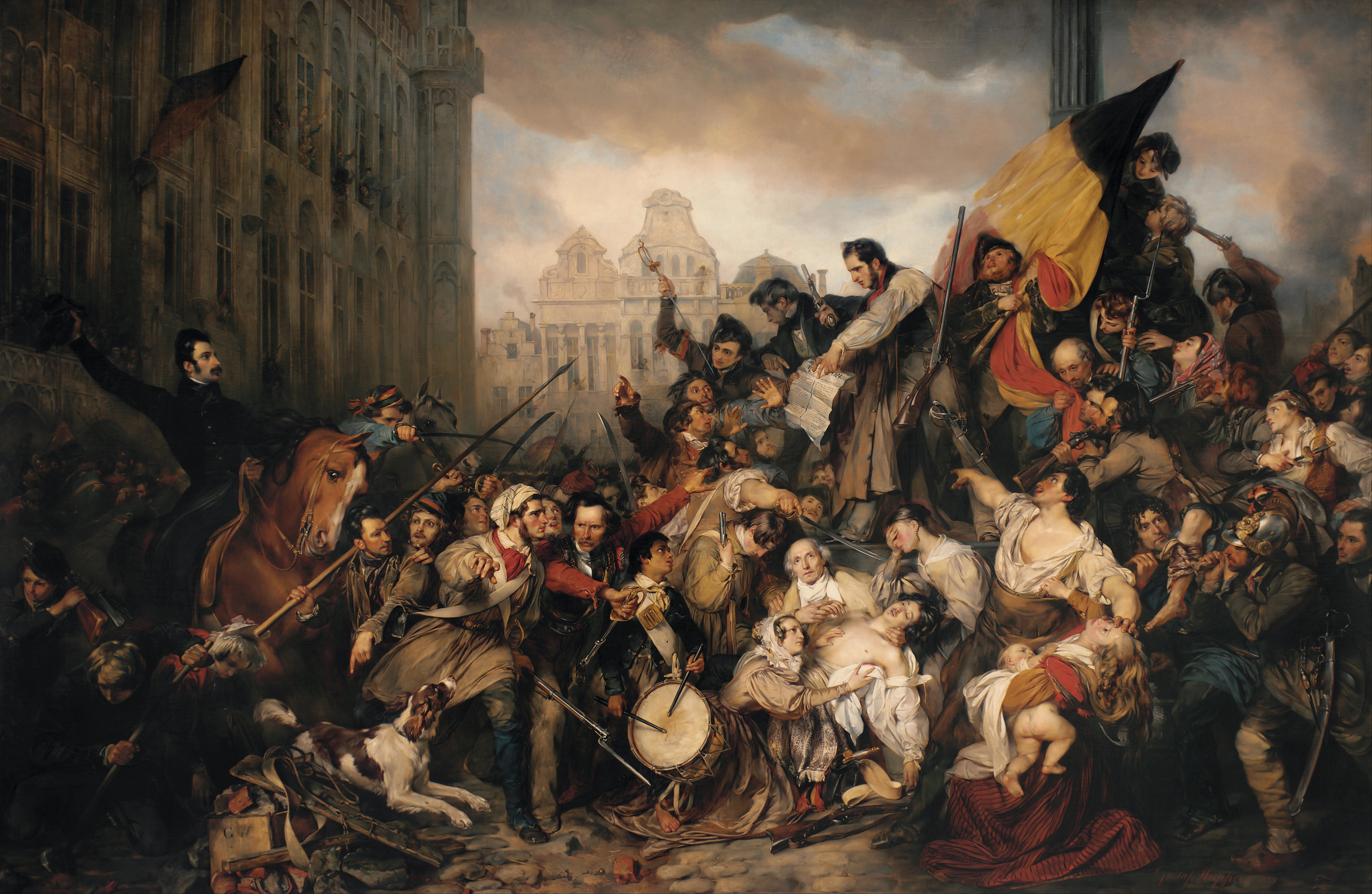
Painting of the Belgian Revolution

The tensions within the United Kingdom of the Netherlands came to a head in 1830 with the outbreak of the Belgian Revolution, which would permanently sunder Belgium from the Netherlands. Sparked in part by events abroad – the July 1830 Revolution in France provided inspiration – unrest broke out in Brussels in late August 1830. What began as a nationalist demonstration at the opera (during a performance of La Muette de Portici, with its patriotic arias) quickly escalated into street riots demanding Belgian autonomy. The disturbances spread to other cities in Brabant and Flanders. By September 1830, an interim Belgian Provisional Government in Brussels declared independence from King William’s rule.

King William I, unwilling to accept the loss of half his kingdom, launched a military campaign in August 1831 to reclaim Belgium. This “Ten Days’ Campaign” initially saw Dutch troops defeat some Belgian forces and advance into Belgian territory. However, the intervention of the French Army (sent by King Louis-Philippe in support of Belgium) and the resilience of Belgian volunteer units thwarted the Dutch offensive and Dutch forces withdrew. The newly established Kingdom of Belgium, under King Leopold I (who had been invited by the Belgians and sworn in as king on 21 July 1831), was here to stay.

Relations were established after Belgium's independence was recognized by the Netherlands in 1839. Under the treaty, the Netherlands reluctantly accepted Belgian independence and in exchange received some compensation: Belgium had to cede the eastern part of Limburg and the Grand Duchy of Luxembourg (except the francophone west, which became Belgian Luxembourg) to the Dutch king. The treaty also reaffirmed Belgian neutrality (which would be a crucial factor in 20th-century events).

Even after 1839, lingering disputes (such as over navigation rights on the Scheldt and the Meuse) had to be negotiated. The Treaty of Maastricht (1843) demarceted the border between the two nations. Both nations turned inward to consolidate their statehood – Belgium to build its new monarchy and institutions, and the Netherlands to recover from the blow and later to liberalize its regime (in 1848). It’s telling that for much of the 19th century, Belgium and the Netherlands had rather cool relations. Dutch public opinion, for a generation, viewed Belgium’s secession as a regrettable betrayal, while many Belgians nurtured suspicions of Dutch intentions. Nevertheless, outright hostility waned over time.

In 1854 Belgian king Leopold I prepared an attack on the Netherlands. His goal was to annex at least the Catholic parts of the Netherlands south of the rivers Meuse and Waal. After receiving no guarantee from French emperor Napoleon III that there would be no action from other European powers, the plan was shelved.

=== Colonial era ===
The Dutch East Indies, also known as the "Netherlands East Indies", which largely makes up modern-day Indonesia with Batavia (now known as Jakarta) that became a Dutch colonial presence by the Dutch East India Company (VOC) back in 1619 which lasted for over 300 years. King Leopold II had claimed his personal private Belgian African colony of the Congo Free State (later as the Belgian Congo) when it was transferred to the Belgian government in 1908, with Léopoldville (now known as Kinshasa) became the capital of the Belgian Congo.

=== World War I ===
At the start of the 20th century, Belgium and the Netherlands pursued different security strategies, but World War I would test their relationship under extreme circumstances. Belgium, whose neutrality had been guaranteed by the 1839 Treaty of London, remained strictly neutral in international conflicts. The Netherlands was also staunchly neutral, having avoided entanglement in 19th-century wars. When World War I erupted in August 1914, these neutrality policies led the two countries down markedly different paths. Germany demanded free passage through Belgium as part of the Schlieffen Plan to attack France, but Belgium, under King Albert I, refused. The result was the German invasion of Belgium on 4 August 1914, a blatant violation of Belgian neutrality. The Netherlands, in contrast, was not invaded – Germany respected Dutch neutrality (in part to keep supply lines open through the Netherlands and to avoid adding another enemy). Thus, during 1914–1918, Belgium endured occupation and warfare on its soil, whereas the Netherlands remained officially at peace. As Belgian civilians fled the advancing German armies, the Netherlands found itself host to a massive wave of refugees – at one point in late 1914, over a million Belgians (roughly one seventh of Belgium’s population) took refuge in the Netherlands. In April 1916, the Force Publique launched an offensive in German East Africa, which captured Kigali, the capital of Rwanda as Belgium administered the territory under military occupation from 1916 to 1922 with its Class B Mandate. On the Dutch-Belgium border, the Germans created the Wire of Death.

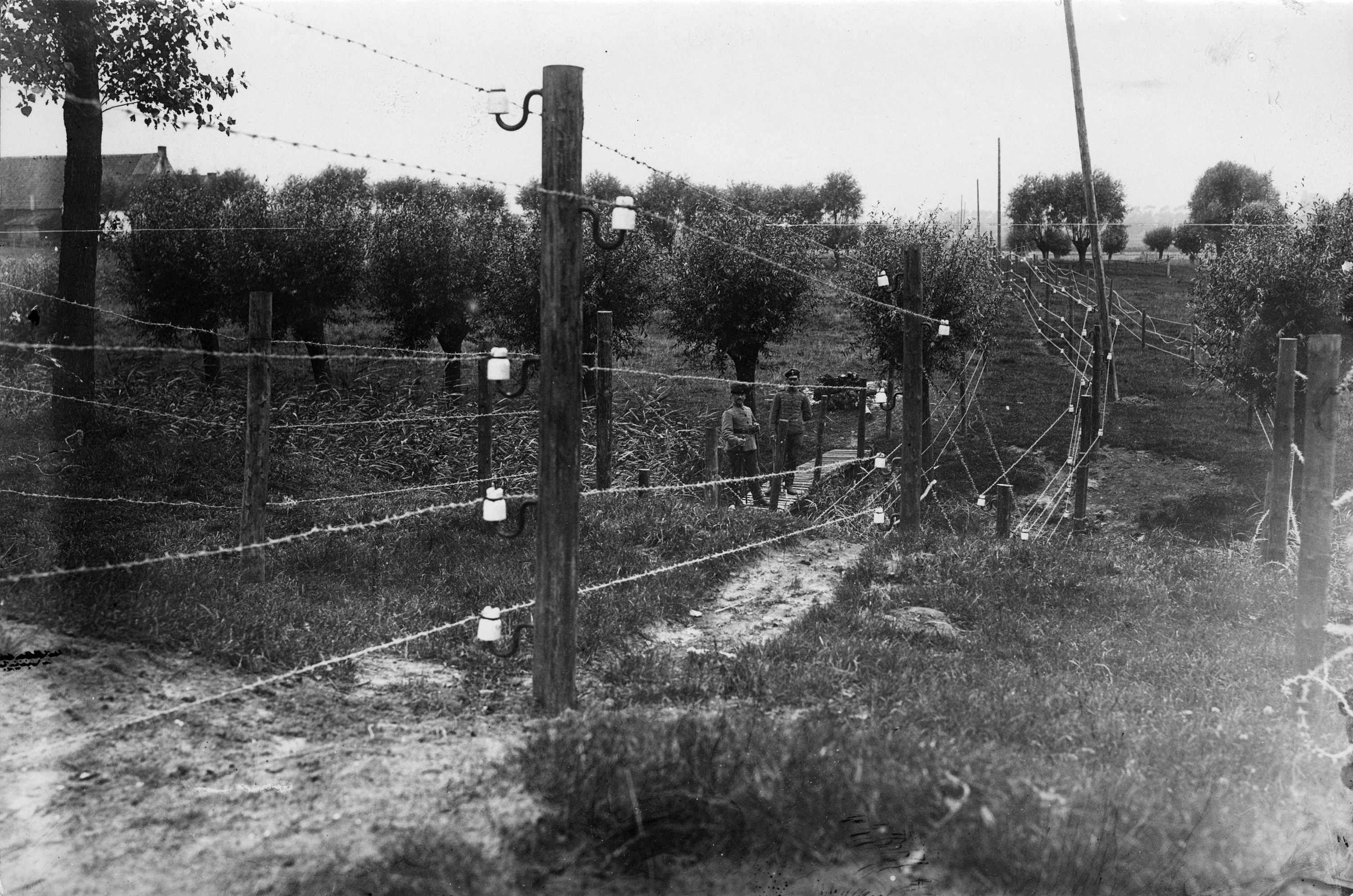
View of the Wire of Death from Sluis.

By war’s end in 1918, the disparity in wartime experiences left a residue of friction between Belgium and the Netherlands. Belgium had suffered enormously (in terms of destruction, civilian hardship, and loss of life) fighting alongside the Allied powers, whereas the Netherlands had managed to stay out of the conflict. Belgian leaders felt that their country had paid a huge price for international principles, while the Dutch sat safely on the sidelines. This translated into post-war policy aims: at the Paris Peace Conference in 1919, Belgium sought to revise aspects of the 1839 settlement that it felt were no longer just. Belgian diplomats argued that Belgian neutrality (imposed in 1839) had been rendered moot by Germany’s violation, and they sought an end to those neutrality obligations. Some influential voices in Belgium even advocated territorial adjustments: proposals floated (though never realized) included annexing Dutch land. In 1919 the Dutch military command made far-reaching preparations to invade Belgium. It was intended as a preventive attack because of Belgium's designs on Zeelandic Flanders and parts of Dutch Limburg. Brussels sought these territories to be able to better defend the country. After the Allies – chiefly the United Kingdom and France – turned against the Belgian demands, the direct military danger disappeared.

Throughout the 1920s, Belgium–Netherlands relations gradually improved as the immediate post-war disagreements were resolved diplomatically. The Dutch monarchy granted asylum to the exiled German Kaiser Wilhelm II in 1918, a decision that annoyed Belgium (which wanted him held accountable), but this issue faded over time. By the late 1920s, the two countries were once again cooperating within the framework of organizations like the League of Nations. Trade between Belgium and the Netherlands recovered, and the Belgian port of Antwerp and Dutch port of Rotterdam developed a friendly rivalry as gateways for European commerce.

=== World War II ===
On the eve of World War II, Belgium and the Netherlands again hoped to stay neutral in the face of growing aggression, but this time neutrality would fail both. In May 1940, the German Wehrmacht launched a surprise invasion of the Low Countries as part of Case Yellow (the assault on France). Both the Netherlands and Belgium were invaded almost simultaneously on May 10, 1940. The Netherlands was rapidly overrun in a brutal five-day campaign, culminating in the bombing of Rotterdam and the Dutch Army’s surrender on May 15. Belgium, with French and British allied support, held out a bit longer (the Belgian Army capitulated on May 28, 1940, after the Allies’ defeat in the Battle of Belgium). The German occupation of both countries that followed was harsh: Nazi civilian administrations were established in each, and both Belgian and Dutch citizens suffered repression, forced labor, and the genocide of Jewish communities.

In exile, the legitimate governments of Belgium and the Netherlands found themselves allies. The Belgian government (under Hubert Pierlot) and the Dutch government (under Pieter Sjoerds Gerbrandy), both based in London alongside other Allied governments-in-exile, established cordial relations and collaborated on plans for post-war recovery. The Force Publique engaged in combat against Italian forces in the region of Italian East Africa (AOI), contributing to the defeat of Mussolini's forces and the restoration of Ethiopia's Haile Selassie during the East African campaign in 1941. The Dutch forces in the Dutch East Indies surrendered to Japan in March 1942, marking the beginning of the Japanese occupation which went on until the Japanese surrender, Indonesian nationalist leaders Sukarno and Hatta proclaimed Indonesia's independence from the Netherlands on 17 August 1945. The A landmark initiative was the signing of the London Customs Convention on 5 September 1944 by Belgium, the Netherlands, and Luxembourg, laying the groundwork for the Benelux Customs Union of 1948. Both countries also saw the tragedy of collaborators and the trauma of civilian suffering (for instance, the “Hunger Winter” of 1944–45 in the Netherlands, and the heavy fighting during liberation in Belgium’s Ardennes during the Battle of the Bulge). By early 1945, Allied forces (principally British, Canadian, and American troops) had liberated Belgium and the southern Netherlands, and in May 1945 the whole of the Netherlands was freed with Germany’s defeat.

=== Cold War ===
in March 1948, Belgium and the Netherlands (with Luxembourg) joined Britain and France in signing the Treaty of Brussels, a 50-year collective defense pact – essentially a precursor to broader Western European defense cooperation. In terms of their mutual relations, the decades after WWII would be marked by unprecedented closeness. The Benelux Union, which started as a customs union in 1948, would deepen in scope – foreshadowing and indeed catalyzing the broader European integration to come. During the Cold War (1947–1989), relations between Belgium and the Netherlands were characterized by friendly cooperation and joint participation in multilateral institutions. Having shed any residual antagonism, the two countries stood firmly on the same side of the East–West divide – both were committed members of NATO and close allies of the United States and Western Europe. The Dutch-Indonesian conference included representatives of the Netherlands, the Republic of Indonesia, and the Federal Consultative Assembly of various Indonesian states created by the Dutch while the Belgo-Congolese conference involved Belgium and the Congolese political leadership.

The 1944–48 customs union was expanded: in 1958 Belgium, the Netherlands, and Luxembourg signed the Benelux Economic Union Agreement, which came into force in 1960, aiming for complete economic integration (free movement of people, goods, capital, and services among the three). Long before European borders at large were opening, the Benelux countries had removed virtually all tariffs (by 1956, nearly all internal trade was duty-free) and even abolished border passport controls with each other by 1970. Belgium and the Netherlands were also core architects of the new European Community. They were among the six founding members of the European Coal and Steel Community (ECSC) in 1951 and the European Economic Community (EEC) in 1957. In fact, the Treaty of Rome (1957) which established the EEC was signed by the foreign ministers of Belgium and the Netherlands along with those of France, Italy, Luxembourg and West Germany (present day Germany).

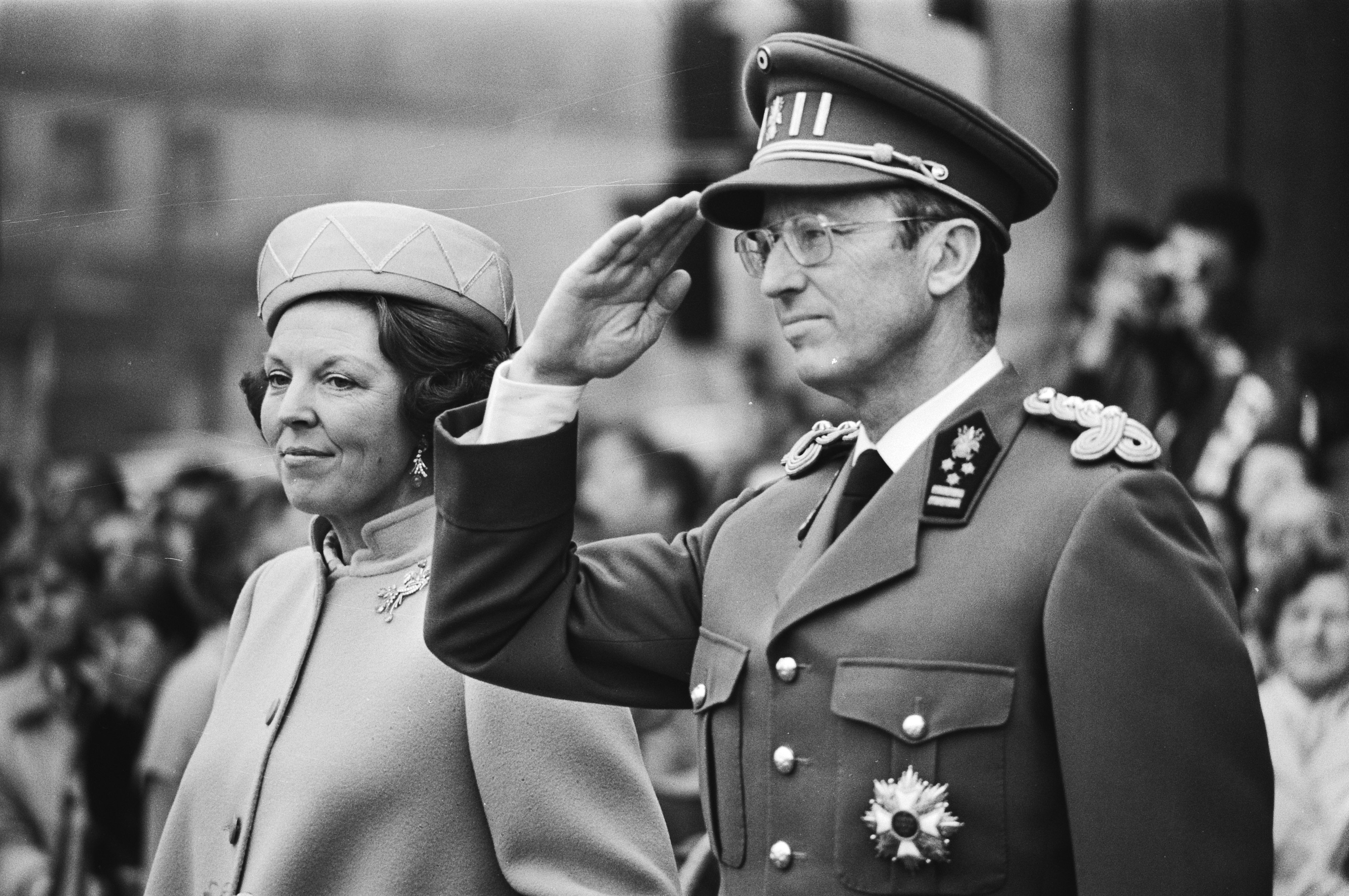
Beatrix of the Netherlands and Baudouin of Belgium in Belgium (1981)

Throughout the 1960s–1980s, any bilateral disagreements were minor and generally resolved pragmatically. One area of occasional dispute was navigation and environmental management in shared waterways (such as the Scheldt estuary or the Meuse river), but long-standing treaties and negotiations usually provided solutions. On 30 June 1960, the Congo achieved its independence from Belgium with Patrice Lumumba as the first Prime Minister during the ceremony led by King Baudouin in Léopoldville (present day Kinshasa), with the country's name changed to the Democratic Republic of the Congo. With King Kigeli V forced into exile in the United States after the Rwandan Revolution concluded. Rwanda gained its full independence from Belgium on 1 July 1962 which declared itself a republic. In 1963, Belgium and the Netherlands finally settled the last payments related to the Scheldt River tolls (Belgium had bought out Dutch toll rights in 1863, and payments continued into the 20th century). Another instance was the joint effort to improve the navigability of the Scheldt and Meuse – projects which required cooperation and were achieved through bilateral commissions.

=== Contemporary relations ===
In the contemporary period (1990s to present), relations between Belgium and the Netherlands have been marked by continuity in friendship and ever-deepening cooperation. Both countries strongly supported the transformation of the European Community into the more integrated European Union (EU) in the early 1990s. They were original signatories of the Maastricht Treaty (1992), which, fittingly, was signed in the Dutch city of Maastricht – symbolizing the ongoing Benelux contribution to European unity. Belgium and the Netherlands were among the first wave of EU member states to adopt the euro currency in 1999–2002, eliminating exchange rate barriers and further binding their economies together. They also joined the Schengen Area in 1995 building on their earlier Benelux abolition of border controls to allow passport-free travel across most of Europe.

== Cultural relations ==
Thanks to their shared history and the Dutch language, the Netherlands and Belgium have strong cultural ties. In 1980, the two countries set up the Dutch Language Union to encourage greater cooperation in the field of Dutch language and literature. The Union offers services including language tools like dictionaries and a language advice service, education in and about Dutch, literature and reading skills, and activities promoting the Dutch language in Europe and the rest of the world. The Union also works to showcase the two countries’ shared cultural heritage. Both nations are great allies with cultural similarities and close cooperation between both governments. Dutch/Flemish (Nederlands/Vlaams) is an official language of Belgium and is the most spoken language in both countries. Approximately 35,000 Belgians are living in the Netherlands, while there are around 111,000 Dutch people living in Belgium.

Many television programmes and series are made mutually between the two countries, such as So You Think You Can Dance, Studio 100 and Benelux' Next Top Model. The two countries were joint hosts of the UEFA Euro 2000 football tournament and unsuccessfully made a bid to host the 2018 World Cup football. The Netherlands, Belgium and Germany also unsuccessfully submitted a joint bid to host the 2027 FIFA Women's World Cup. Belgium and the Netherlands also have joint sports leagues, such as the BENE-League Handball, BNXT League (basketball), the BeNe Conference (volleyball) and Central European Hockey League (ice hockey). Between 2012 and 2015, a BeNe League for women's football was held.

== Visits ==
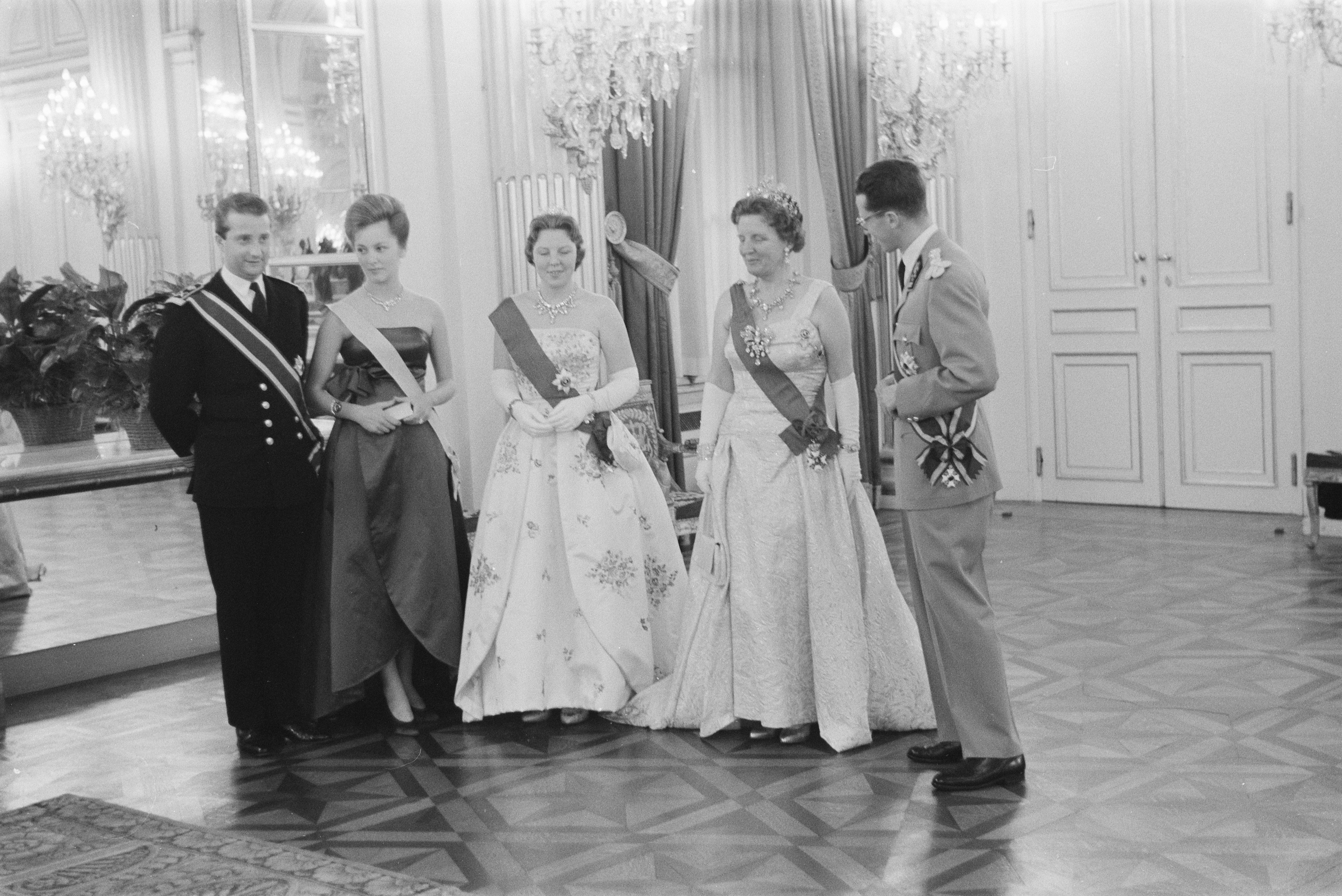
1960, visit and dinner in the Royal Palace of Brussels

=== State visits ===
- 1938: Visit of King Leopold in Amsterdam.
- 1960: Visit of Queen Juliana to Brussels.
- 2016: State Visit of King Philippe to King Willem Alexander, the King and Queen were bestowed Knight Grand Cross of the Order of the Netherlands Lion.
- 2023: State Visit of King Willem-Alexander and Queen Máxima (and 8 Dutch government ministers) to all three of Belgium’s regions. Attention was given to energy transition issues and to political, cultural and economic themes. Visits included the Tomb of the Unknown Soldier, the Royal Palace, the Town Hall, the Laken Castle, the Federal Parliament and the Climate Tech Forum in Brussels, as well as the Aerospacelab in Mont-Saint-Guibert, the Queen Elisabeth Music Chapel in Waterloo, the Biopark in Charleroi, Imec in Leuven and both the Royal Museum of Fine Arts and the city’s Port House in Antwerp.

=== Other ===
The Duke of Brabant was invited to attend the inauguration of King Willem Alexander and Queen Mathilde is a godmother of Princess Alexia of the Netherlands.

Queen Beatrix attended the state Funerals of King Baudouin and Queen Fabiola. Queen Juliana attended the Wedding of King Baudoin and Queen Fabiola in 1960.

== International organizations ==
Both countries are founding members of the European Union, NATO, and the Council of Europe.

== Resident diplomatic missions ==
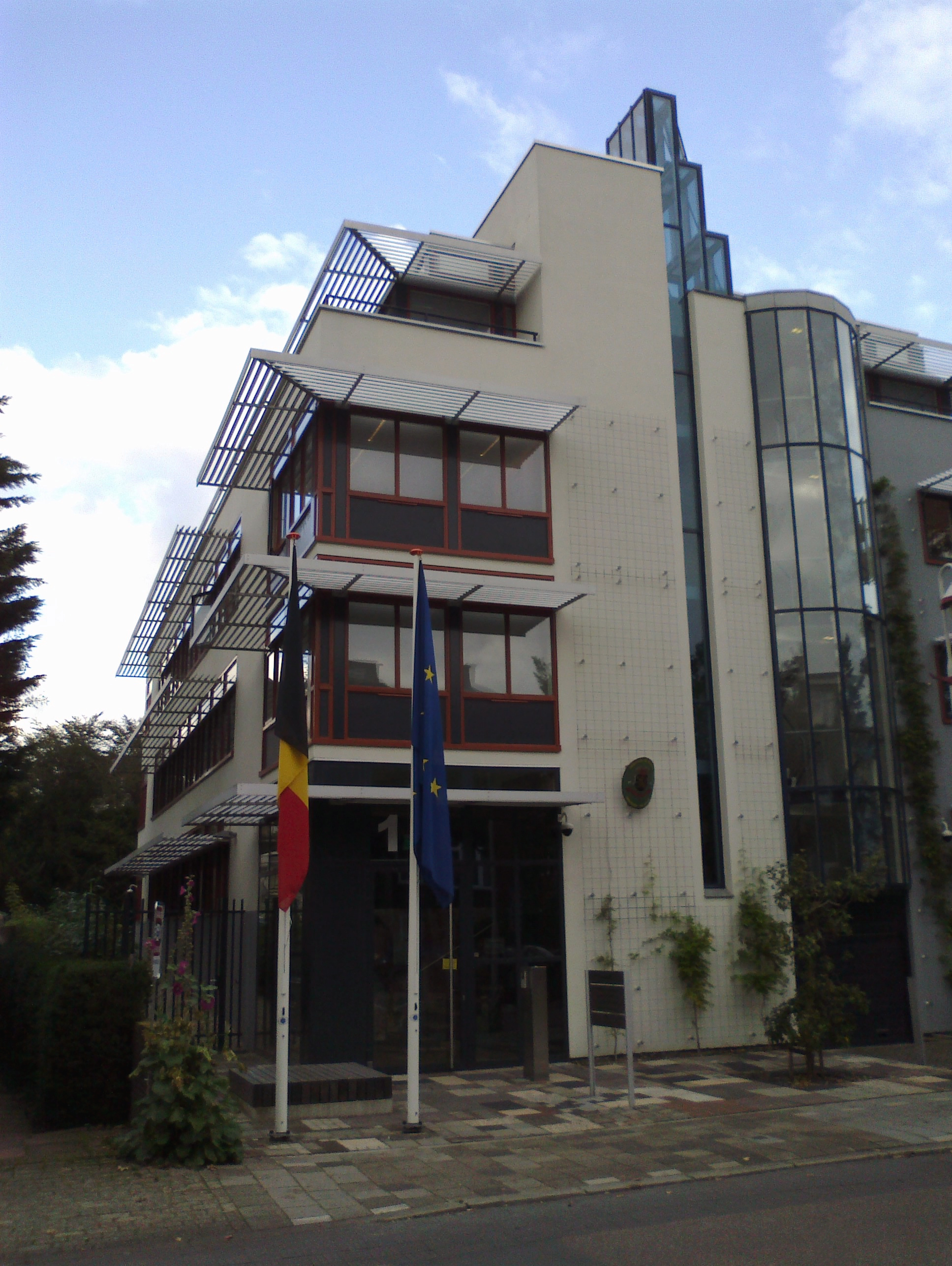
Embassy of Belgium in The Hague

- Belgium has an embassy in The Hague.
- The Netherlands has an embassy in Brussels and a consulate-general in Antwerp.

== See also ==
- Benelux
- Belgium–Netherlands border
