= Christina Edwards =

American soccer player

Personal information
- Full name: Christina Nicole Edwards
- Date of birth: February 12, 1998 (age 28)
- Place of birth: Bend, Oregon, United States
- Height: 5 ft 9 in (1.75 m)
- Positions: Midfielder; forward

Youth career
- –2016: Bend FC Timbers

College career
Years	Team	Apps	(Gls)
2016–2019	Arizona State Sun Devils	67	(6)

Senior career*
Years	Team	Apps	(Gls)
2020–2021	Borussia Bocholt	15	(5)
Total		15	(5)
- * Club domestic league appearances and goals

Christina Nicole Edwards (born February 12, 1998) is an American retired soccer player who played as a midfielder or forward.

== Career statistics ==
Appearances and goals by club, season and competition
Club	Season	League			Cup (Note: All appearances in the DFB-Pokal Frauen)		Total	
Club	Season	Division	Apps	Goals	Apps	Goals	Apps	Goals
Borussia Bocholt	2020–21	2. Frauen-Bundesliga	15	5	2	0	17	5
Total			15	5	2	0	17	5
