= Würzburger Kickers (women) =

- Full name: Fußball-Club Würzburger Kickers e.V.
- Founded: January 3, 2020; 6 years ago
- Ground: Sportpark Heuchelhof, Würzburg
- Capacity: 2,000
- Head coach: Marius Wiederer
- League: Bayernliga
- 2024–25: 4th
- Website: fwk-frauen.de
Home colours	Away colours

Würzburger Kickers is a German women's association football team based in Würzburg, North Rhine-Westphalia.

== History ==
=== Würzburg Dragons ===
Founded in 1974 as SC Heuchelhof, the club launched its girls' football program in 2010, which achieved success at youth level. Following its renaming to SC Würzburg Heuchelhof e.V. in May 2018, the club's girls' and women's section adopted the name Würzburg Dragons. In 2018–19, the club integrated the women's and U17 teams of ETSV Würzburg. Under head coach Gernot Haubenthal, the Dragons earned promotion to the Regionalliga Süd, and in the shortened 2019–20 season, won promotion to the 2. Frauen-Bundesliga.

=== Würzburger Kickers ===
In January 2020, SC Würzburg Heuchelhof and FC Würzburger Kickers jointly announced the creation of a new independent club dedicated to girls' and women's football. Branded under the Würzburger Kickers umbrella, the newly founded FC Würzburger Kickers Mädchen- & Frauenfußball e.V. began competition in the 2. Frauen-Bundesliga for the 2020–21 season after inheriting the playing license from the Würzburg Dragons.

Despite strong foundations, the club was relegated from both the 2. Frauen-Bundesliga and later the Regionalliga Süd, returning to the Bayernliga ahead of the 2024–25 season.

== Squad ==
As of 1 August 2025

Note: Flags indicate national team as defined under FIFA eligibility rules; some limited exceptions apply. Players may hold more than one non-FIFA nationality.

No.	Pos.	Nation	Player
1	GK	GER	Lara Wagner
3	DF	GER	Anna Reinders
4	MF	GER	Marie Glos
5	DF	GER	Isabell Heinisch
6	DF	GER	Jule Mühl
7	MF	GER	Karolina Sajevic
8	MF	GER	Annika Bröcker
11	FW	GER	Lisa Blum
12	DF	GER	Lisa Schindler
13	FW	GER	Julia Forster
14	MF	GER	Nina Schulz
15	DF	GER	Sarah Zottmann (captain)
16	DF	GER	Jule Dickmeis

No.	Pos.	Nation	Player
17	MF	GER	Johanna Rüppel
18	MF	GER	Amelie Neumaier
19	FW	GER	Julia Asam
20	DF	GER	Elena Roth
21	DF	GER	Lena Wicker
25	DF	GER	Lena Betz
27	FW	GER	Allegra Dietz
29	MF	GER	Ela Schlicker
31	FW	GER	Laura Gerst
47	GK	GER	Hannah Schumann
—	MF	GER	Tamira Stegmann
—	FW	GER	Jessica Miller
—	FW	GER	Eslem Yüksel

=== Former players ===
- Kaiya McCullough
- Jenaya Robertson

== Current staff ==
As of 1 August 2025

Coaching staff
(Germany) Marius Wiederer	Head coach
(Germany) Fabian Ritter	Assistant coach / Team manager
(Germany) Pascal Krämer	Goalkeeping coach
(Germany) Sofia Bender	Athletic coach
(Germany) Anna Müller-Scholden	Physiotherapist
(Germany) Christina Döring	Team psychologist
