= Vanessa Leimenstoll =

German association football player

Personal information
- Full name: Vanessa Leimenstoll
- Date of birth: 1 March 2001 (age 25)
- Place of birth: Germany
- Position: Forward

Team information
- Current team: 1. FC Köln
- Number: 29

Senior career*
Years	Team	Apps	(Gls)
2021–2024	TSG Hoffenheim II	43	(18)
2021–2024	TSG Hoffenheim	36	(4)
2024-	1. FC Köln	47	(3)
- * Club domestic league appearances and goals as of 21 November 2026

Vanessa Leimenstoll (born 1 March 2001) is a German professional footballer who plays as a forward for Frauen-Bundesliga club 1. FC Köln.
