= Linda French =

Linda French may refer to:

- Linda French (badminton) (born 1964), American badminton player
- Linda M. French (1951–2025), American astronomer
