= Belgium–Germany–Netherlands 2027 FIFA Women's World Cup bid =

Football World Cup host nation bid

Belgium, Germany, Netherlands bid
- for the 2027 FIFA Women's World Cup

Bid details
- Bidding nation: Belgium, Germany, Netherlands
- Bidding federation: RBFA, DFB, KNVB
- Proposed venues: 13 (in 13 cities)

The Belgium–Germany–the Netherlands bid for the 2027 FIFA Women's World Cup was an unsuccessful joint bid to host the 2027 FIFA Women's World Cup by the football associations of Belgium, Germany, and the Netherlands. The bid was announced on 24 March 2023. The slogan of the bid is titled: "Breaking New Ground".

== Background ==
Netherlands originally wanted to bid by themselves as early as 2018. They later asked Belgium and Germany about potentially co-hosting the tournament. In October 2020, their intent to bid was officially announced.

Belgium and the Netherlands have previously co-hosted the UEFA European Championship in 2000, and Belgium had hosted it earlier in 1972. Germany has been the host for the FIFA Women's World Cup in 2011, the UEFA Women's Euro 2001, the FIFA Men's World Cup in 1974 and 2006, and the men's UEFA Euro 1988. Germany is also slated to host the men's UEFA Euro 2024. Both Germany and the Netherlands hosted several matches during the multi-national UEFA Euro 2020. The Netherlands was the host nation for the UEFA Women's Euro 2017.

== Proposed venues ==
Belgium–Germany–Netherlands 2027 FIFA Women's World Cup bid (Benelux)

On the 9 August, Germany proposed the host cities are Cologne, Dortmund, Duisburg and Düsseldorf, all located in the state of North Rhine-Westphalia. Aachen, Gelsenkirchen and Mönchengladbach were not chosen. However, on 6 September 2023, Duisburg withdrew due to problems with their stadium not meeting requirements. Gelsenkirchen was named the replacement on the 27 September 2023.

The proposed host cities in the Netherlands would be Amsterdam, Eindhoven, Enschede, Heerenveen, and Rotterdam.

The proposed host cities in Belgium were Genk, Anderlecht, Gent and Charleroi. Despite Brussels, Brugges and Liège all possessing the three biggest stadiums in the country, were not selected as cities for Belgium. Regarding the capital Brussels, the King Baudouin Stadium did not meet some requirements and the local government didn't think there was enough time to fix the problems, leading to Brussels' exclusion. Charleroi will have a new stadium to be built in time should the Belgium-Germany-Netherlands bid be awarded.

Either Amsterdam or Dortmund would host the final.

Dortmund	Gelsenkirchen	Düsseldorf
Signal Iduna Park	Veltins-Arena	Merkur Spiel-Arena
Capacity: 66,099	Capacity: 54,740	Capacity: 54,600
Cologne	Amsterdam	Rotterdam
RheinEnergieStadion	Johan Cruyff Arena	De Kuip
Capacity: 45,965	Capacity: 55,865	Capacity: 47,500
Eindhoven	Enschede	Heerenveen
Philips Stadion	De Grolsch Veste	Abe Lenstra Stadion
Capacity: 35,119	Capacity: 30,205	Capacity: 27,224
Anderlecht	Gent	Genk
Lotto Park	Planet Group Arena	Cegeka Arena
Capacity: 22,500	Capacity: 20,185	Capacity: 20,040
Charleroi
ZebrArena Charleroi (New stadium)
Capacity: 20,000

== See also ==
- 2027 FIFA Women's World Cup
- Belgium women's national football team
- Germany women's national football team
- Netherlands women's national football team
