= Borussia Bocholt =

German football club

- Full name: Ballspielverein Borussia Bocholt
- Founded: 7 August 1960
- League: Kreisliga A Rees-Bocholt (VIII)
- 2015–16: 15th

BV Borussia Bocholt is a German football club from the city of Bocholt, North Rhine-Westphalia, notable for its men's and women's first teams.

== History ==
Borussia was established on 7 August 1960 and played in the lower leagues of Bocholt for the remainder of the 20th century until they made their way up in the ranks that in 2002, they first entered the Bezirksliga (VI). A last-place result in their second season in the sixth tier handed them a return to the Kreisliga until a championship in their district promoted them again in 2007. By winning another title in their Bezirksliga group, in 2011 Borussia reached the Landesliga Niederrhein (VI) for the first time. After two seasons in that league, two successive 14th-place finishes gave them a double demotion for another stint in the Kreisliga.

The club opened its women's section in 2004 and competed initially in the Kreisliga. Two successive titles and promotions by 2006 enabled them to play in the Niederrheinliga (IV) for the next five years. In the women's Lower Rhine Cup Borussia, runners-up twice in 2007 and 2010, were winners in 2008 and in 2012. For those cup wins they qualified for the women's DFB-Pokal but lasted only in the first round on both occasions. The female footballers attained their greatest success in 2011 by winning the Lower Rhine's highest league and promotion to the Regionalliga West (III) where they play ever since.

== Honors ==
Men

- Bezirksliga Gruppe 7
  - Winners: 2011

Women

- Landesliga Niederrhein
  - Winners: 2006
- Niederrheinliga
  - Winners: 2011
