= 2024–25 2. Frauen-Bundesliga =

2. Frauen-Bundesliga
- Season: 2024–25
- Dates: 24 August 2024 – 18 May 2025
- Champions: Union Berlin
- Promoted: Union Berlin; 1. FC Nürnberg; Hamburger SV
- Relegated: SV 67 Weinberg; SC Freiburg II; Gütersloh
- Matches played: 182
- Goals scored: 546 (3 per match)
- Top goalscorer: Lisa Heiseler (22 goals)
- Biggest home win: Hamburg 6–0 Gütersloh; Nürnberg 6–0 Weinberg; Berlin 6–0 Sand
- Biggest away win: Andernach 0–7 Sand
- Highest scoring: Ingolstadt 3–7 Meppen; Sand 6–4 Munich II
- Longest winning run: 7 games Nürnberg
- Longest unbeaten run: 11 games Nürnberg
- Longest winless run: 10 games Gütersloh
- Longest losing run: 10 games Gütersloh
- Attendance: 146,543 (805 per match)

The 2024–25 season of the 2. Frauen-Bundesliga was the 21st season of Germany's second-tier women's football league. It ran from 24 August 2024 to 18 May 2025.

In June 2024, the DFB announced that the 2025–26 Frauen-Bundesliga would played with 14 teams, so in this season three teams got promoted.

The fixtures were announced on 19 July 2024.

== Teams ==
Locations of teams in the 2024–25 2. Frauen-Bundesliga

=== Team changes ===
Entering league		Exiting league	
Promoted from 2023–24 Regionalliga	Relegated from 2023–24 Bundesliga	Promoted to 2024–25 Bundesliga	Relegated to 2024–25 Regionalliga
SC Freiburg II; VfL Bochum; Union Berlin	1. FC Nürnberg; ~~MSV Duisburg~~	Turbine Potsdam; Carl Zeiss Jena	VfL Wolfsburg II; TSG Hoffenheim II

- MSV Duisburg did not take their spot and were relegated further, with SV 67 Weinberg taken their spot after being relegated originally.

=== Stadiums ===
Team	Home city	Home ground	Capacity
SG Andernach	Andernach	Stadion am Bassenheimer Weg	15,220
Union Berlin	Berlin	Fritz-Lesch-Sportplatz	6,000
VfL Bochum	Bochum	Leichtathletikplatz am Ruhrstadion	1,500
Eintracht Frankfurt II	Frankfurt	Stadion am Brentanobad	5,200
SC Freiburg II	Freiburg	Schönbergstadion	3,000
FSV Gütersloh	Gütersloh	Tönnies-Arena	4,252
Hamburger SV	Hamburg	Paul-Hauenschild-Anlage	1,000
FC Ingolstadt	Ingolstadt	ESV-Stadion	11,481
SV Meppen	Meppen	Hänsch-Arena	16,500
Borussia Mönchengladbach	Mönchengladbach	Grenzlandstadion	10,000
Bayern Munich II	Munich	Sportpark Aschheim	3,000
1. FC Nürnberg	Nuremberg	Max-Morlock-Stadion	50,000
SC Sand	Willstätt	Kühnmatt Stadion	2,000
SV 67 Weinberg	Aurach	Sportanlage Weinberg	1,000

== League table ==
Pos	Team	Pld	W	D	L	GF	GA	GD	Pts	Qualification or relegation
1	Union Berlin (C, P)	26	19	5	2	71	17	+54	62	Promotion to Bundesliga
2	1. FC Nürnberg (P)	26	20	2	4	62	24	+38	62	Promotion to Bundesliga
3	Hamburger SV (P)	26	15	8	3	50	15	+35	53	Promotion to Bundesliga
4	SC Sand	26	14	5	7	66	46	+20	47	
5	SV Meppen	26	13	4	9	40	29	+11	43	
6	Eintracht Frankfurt II (Note: Reserve teams cannot compete in the Frauen-Bundesliga and are therefore ineligible for promotion.)	26	13	4	9	29	25	+4	43	
7	VfL Bochum	26	11	5	10	40	40	0	38	
8	FC Ingolstadt	26	10	5	11	41	43	−2	35	
9	Borussia Mönchengladbach	26	8	5	13	33	41	−8	29	
10	Bayern Munich II	26	6	6	14	30	45	−15	24	
11	SG Andernach	26	7	3	16	23	54	−31	24	
12	SV 67 Weinberg (R)	26	5	5	16	22	62	−40	20	Relegation to Regionalliga
13	SC Freiburg II (R)	26	5	3	18	21	45	−24	18	Relegation to Regionalliga
14	FSV Gütersloh (R)	26	5	2	19	29	71	−42	17	Relegation to Regionalliga

Source: DFB
Rules for classification: 1) Points; 2) Goal difference; 3) Goals scored; 4) Head-to-head results; 5) Head-to-head away goals scored; 6) Away goals scored; 7) Play-off.
(C) Champions; (P) Promoted; (R) Relegated

== Results ==
Home \ Away	AND	BER	BOC	FR2	FRE	GÜT	HAM	ING	MEP	MÖN	MU2	NÜR	SAN	WEI
SG Andernach	—	0–2	1–2	2–1	1–0	1–0	1–2	1–2	0–0	1–2	1–1	1–4	0–7	0–2
Union Berlin	3–0	—	1–1	1–2	2–0	6–0	2–2	4–0	2–1	6–1	3–0	4–0	6–0	2–0
VfL Bochum	3–1	2–5	—	1–0	2–1	3–0	1–2	1–0	1–2	1–1	0–2	0–1	3–2	2–2
Eintracht Frankfurt II	1–0	1–0	1–1	—	0–0	4–1	0–0	1–0	2–0	1–0	1–2	0–4	1–5	3–0
SC Freiburg II	0–1	2–3	1–2	2–0	—	0–3	0–5	0–1	2–3	0–1	3–1	2–1	0–1	2–0
FSV Gütersloh	1–0	1–3	5–1	1–2	0–4	—	0–1	0–6	1–1	1–1	1–3	1–3	3–1	1–3
Hamburger SV	4–0	1–2	0–1	1–0	3–0	6–0	—	1–1	0–0	2–0	0–0	1–1	2–3	5–0
FC Ingolstadt	1–1	0–5	3–1	0–1	3–0	3–1	0–3	—	3–7	0–0	3–1	1–3	1–3	4–1
SV Meppen	4–1	0–4	1–0	3–1	2–0	5–1	0–1	2–1	—	1–0	1–1	0–1	2–0	1–0
Borussia Mönchengladbach	2–1	0–0	2–4	0–1	4–0	2–3	1–3	1–1	1–0	—	1–2	1–2	0–2	4–0
Bayern Munich II	2–3	2–2	0–3	0–1	2–0	5–2	0–1	0–1	0–2 (Note: The match, originally ended in a 1–1 draw, was counted as a win for Meppen as Munich fielded a player who was not registered.)	0–1	—	0–4	1–2	0–0
1. FC Nürnberg	0–1	0–0	3–2	1–0	2–0	2–1	0–2	3–2	2–0	2–1	3–1	—	6–1	6–0
SC Sand	6–0	1–2	1–1	0–0	2–2	3–0	1–1	2–2	1–0	6–2	6–4	2–4	—	5–1
SV 67 Weinberg	2–4	0–1	2–1	0–4	0–0	2–1	1–1	0–2	3–2	1–4	0–0	0–4	2–3	—

Source: DFB
Legend: Blue = home team win; Yellow = draw; Red = away team win.

== Statistics ==
=== Top scorers ===
Rank	Player	Club	Goals
1	(Germany) Lisa Heiseler	Union Berlin	22
2	(Montenegro) Medina Dešić	1. FC Nürnberg	19
3	(Germany) Nastassja Lein	1. FC Nürnberg	15
4	(Germany) Dina Orschmann	Union Berlin	14
5	(Portugal) Anna Marques	VfL Bochum	13
6	(Germany) Jacqueline Baumgärtel	FSV Gütersloh; 1. FC Nürnberg	12
6	(Canada) Cecilia Way	SC Sand	12
8	(Germany) Julia Matuschewski	SC Sand	11
9	(Germany) Sanja Homann	SC Sand	10
9	(Germany) Pija Reininger	FC Ingolstadt	10

=== Hat-tricks ===
Player	Club	Against	Result	Date
(Canada) Cecilia Way	SC Sand	SG Andernach	7–0 (A)	8 December 2024
(Germany) Selma Licina^{4}	SV Meppen	FC Ingolstadt	7–3 (A)	16 February 2025
(Montenegro) Medina Dešić	1. FC Nürnberg	SG Andernach	4–1 (A)	2 March 2025
(Germany) Lisa Heiseler	Union Berlin	SG Andernach	3–0 (H)	9 March 2025
(Jamaica) Paige Bailey-Gayle^{4}	SC Sand	Bayern Munich II	6–4 (H)	20 April 2025
(Germany) Lisa Heiseler	Union Berlin	FSV Gütersloh	6–0 (H)	18 May 2025

- ^{4} Player scored four goals.

=== Clean sheets ===
Rank	Player	Club	Clean sheets
1	(Germany) Cara Bösl	Union Berlin	13
2	(Germany) Lina Altenburg	Eintracht Frankfurt II	11
2	(Germany) Inga Schuldt	Hamburger SV	11
4	(Germany) Hannah Etzold	1. FC Nürnberg	7
5	(Germany) Thea Farwick	SV Meppen	6
6	(Germany) Jule Baum	SC Sand	5
6	(Germany) Laura van der Laan	SG Andernach	5
6	(Germany) Luisa Palmen	Borussia Mönchengladbach	5
9	(Germany) Anna-Lena Daum	FC Ingolstadt	4
10	(Austria) Kristin Krammer	1. FC Nürnberg	3
10	(Germany) Kari Närdemann	VfL Bochum	3
10	(Germany) Jolina Zamorano	Hamburger SV	3
