= 2024–25 in German football =

Football in Germany
- Season: 2024–25

Men's football
- Bundesliga: Bayern Munich
- 2. Bundesliga: 1. FC Köln
- 3. Liga: Arminia Bielefeld
- DFB-Pokal: VfB Stuttgart
- DFL-Supercup: Bayer Leverkusen

Women's football
- Frauen-Bundesliga: Bayern Munich
- 2. Frauen-Bundesliga: Union Berlin
- DFB-Pokal: Bayern Munich
- DFB-Supercup: Bayern Munich

The 2024–25 season was the 115th season of competitive football in Germany.

== Promotion and relegation ==
=== Pre-season ===
League	Promoted to league	Relegated from league
Bundesliga	Holstein Kiel; FC St. Pauli	1. FC Köln; Darmstadt 98
2. Bundesliga	SSV Ulm; Preußen Münster; Jahn Regensburg	Wehen Wiesbaden; Hansa Rostock; VfL Osnabrück
3. Liga	Alemannia Aachen; Energie Cottbus; Hannover 96 II; VfB Stuttgart II	Hallescher FC; MSV Duisburg; VfB Lübeck; SC Freiburg II
Frauen-Bundesliga	Turbine Potsdam; Carl Zeiss Jena	1. FC Nürnberg; MSV Duisburg^{1}
2. Frauen-Bundesliga	SC Freiburg II; VfL Bochum; Union Berlin	VfL Wolfsburg II; TSG Hoffenheim II

MSV Duisburg did not take their spot in the 2024–25 2. Frauen-Bundesliga and were therefore relegated further to the 2024–25 Frauen-Regionalliga West, sparing SV 67 Weinberg from relegation from the 2023–24 2. Frauen-Bundesliga.

=== Post-season ===
League	Promoted to league	Relegated from league
Bundesliga	1. FC Köln; Hamburger SV	Holstein Kiel; VfL Bochum
2. Bundesliga	Dynamo Dresden; Arminia Bielefeld	SSV Ulm; Jahn Regensburg
3. Liga	MSV Duisburg; TSV Havelse; TSG Hoffenheim II; 1. FC Schweinfurt	Borussia Dortmund II; Hannover 96 II; SV Sandhausen; SpVgg Unterhaching
Frauen-Bundesliga^{2}	1. FC Nürnberg; Union Berlin; Hamburger SV	Turbine Potsdam
2. Frauen-Bundesliga	Viktoria Berlin; Mainz 05; VfB Stuttgart; VfR Warbeyen; VfL Wolfsburg II	SV 67 Weinberg; SC Freiburg II; FSV Gütersloh

The Frauen-Bundesliga will be expanded to 14 teams for the 2025–26 season.

== National teams ==
Win Draw Loss

=== Germany national football team ===
==== Kits ====
Home	Away

==== UEFA Euro 2024 ====
===== UEFA Euro 2024 fixtures and results =====
5 July 2024 Quarter-finals	Spain	2–1 (a.e.t.)	Germany	Stuttgart, Germany
18:00 (18:00 UTC+2)	Olmo 51'; Merino 119'	Report	Wirtz 89'	Stadium: MHPArena; Attendance: 54,000; Referee: Anthony Taylor (England)

==== 2024–25 UEFA Nations League ====
===== League A Group 3 =====
Pos	Team	Pld	W	D	L	GF	GA	GD	Pts	Qualification or relegation	(Germany)	(Netherlands)	(Hungary)	(Bosnia and Herzegovina)
1	Germany	6	4	2	0	18	4	+14	14	Advance to quarter-finals	—	1–0	5–0	7–0
2	Netherlands	6	2	3	1	13	7	+6	9	Advance to quarter-finals	2–2	—	4–0	5–2
3	Hungary (R)	6	1	3	2	4	11	−7	6	Qualification for relegation play-offs	1–1	1–1	—	0–0
4	Bosnia and Herzegovina (R)	6	0	2	4	4	17	−13	2	Relegation to League B	1–2	1–1	0–2	—

Source: UEFA
Rules for classification: Tiebreakers
(R) Relegated

7 September 2024 League phase	Germany	5–0	Hungary	Düsseldorf
20:45 (20:45 UTC+2)	Füllkrug 27'; Musiala 58'; Wirtz 66'; Pavlović 77'; Havertz 81' (pen.)	Report		Stadium: Merkur Spiel-Arena; Attendance: 49,235; Referee: Clément Turpin (France)

10 September 2024 League phase	Netherlands	2–2	Germany	Amsterdam
20:45 (20:45 UTC+2)	Reijnders 2'; Dumfries 50'	Report	Undav 38'; Kimmich 45+3'	Stadium: Johan Cruyff Arena; Attendance: 50,109; Referee: Davide Massa (Italy)

11 October 2024 League phase	Bosnia and Herzegovina	1–2	Germany	Zenica
20:45 (20:45 UTC+2)	Džeko 70'	Report	Undav 30', 36'	Stadium: Bilino Polje Stadium; Attendance: 11,000; Referee: François Letexier (France)

14 October 2024 League phase	Germany	1–0	Netherlands	Munich
20:45 (20:45 UTC+2)	Leweling 64'	Report		Stadium: Allianz Arena; Attendance: 68,367; Referee: Slavko Vinčić (Slovenia)

16 November 2024 League phase	Germany	7–0	Bosnia and Herzegovina	Freiburg im Breisgau
20:45 (20:45 UTC+1)	Musiala 2'; Kleindienst 23', 79'; Havertz 37'; Wirtz 50', 57'; Sané 66'	Report		Stadium: Europa-Park Stadion; Attendance: 28,143; Referee: Vassilis Fotias (Greece)

19 November 2024 League phase	Hungary	1–1	Germany	Budapest
20:45 (20:45 UTC+1)	Szoboszlai 90+9' (pen.)	Report	Nmecha 76'	Stadium: Puskás Aréna; Attendance: 53,212; Referee: Duje Strukan (Croatia)

===== Quarter-finals =====
20 March 2025 Quarter-finals	Italy	1–2	Germany	Milan
20:45 (20:45 UTC+1)	Tonali 9'	Report	Kleindienst 49'; Goretzka 76'	Stadium: San Siro; Attendance: 60,334; Referee: François Letexier (France)

23 March 2025 Quarter-finals	Germany	3–3 (5–4 agg.)	Italy	Dortmund
20:45 (20:45 UTC+1)	Kimmich 30' (pen.); Musiala 36'; Kleindienst 45'	Report	Kean 49', 69'; Raspadori 90+5' (pen.)	Stadium: Westfalenstadion; Attendance: 64,762; Referee: Szymon Marciniak (Poland)

===== Finals =====
4 June 2025 Semi-finals	Germany	1–2	Portugal	Munich
21:10 (21:10 UTC+2)	Wirtz 48'	Report	Conceição 63'; Ronaldo 68'	Stadium: Allianz Arena; Attendance: 65,823; Referee: Slavko Vinčić (Slovenia)

8 June 2025 Third place play-off	Germany	0–2	France	Stuttgart
15:00 (15:00 UTC+2)		Report	Mbappé 45'; Olise 84'	Stadium: MHPArena; Attendance: 51,313; Referee: Ivan Kružliak (Slovakia)

=== Germany women's national football team ===
==== Kits ====
Home	Away

==== UEFA Women's Euro 2025 qualifying ====
===== UEFA Women's Euro 2025 qualifying League A =====
Pos	Team	Pld	W	D	L	GF	GA	GD	Pts	Qualification	(Germany)	(Iceland)	(Austria)	(Poland)
1	Germany	6	5	0	1	17	8	+9	15	Qualify for final tournament	—	3–1	4–0	4–1
2	Iceland	6	4	1	1	11	5	+6	13	Qualify for final tournament	3–0	—	2–1	3–0
3	Austria	6	2	1	3	10	12	−2	7	Advance to play-offs (seeded)	2–3	1–1	—	3–1
4	Poland (R)	6	0	0	6	4	17	−13	0	Advance to play-offs (seeded) and relegation to League B	1–3	0–1	1–3	—

Source: UEFA
Rules for classification: Tiebreakers
(R) Relegated

===== UEFA Women's Euro 2025 qualifying fixtures and results =====
12 July 2024 UEFA Women's Euro 2025 qualifying	Iceland	3–0	Germany	Reykjavík
18:15 (16:15 UTC+0)	Sigurðardóttir 14'; Jóhannsdóttir 52'; Jónsdóttir 83'	Report		Stadium: Laugardalsvöllur; Attendance: 5,243; Referee: Cheryl Foster (Wales)

16 July 2024 UEFA Women's Euro 2025 qualifying	Germany	4–0	Austria	Hanover
19:00 (19:00 UTC+2)	Bühl 11', 90+3'; Brand 39'; Schüller 53'	Report		Stadium: Niedersachsenstadion; Attendance: 43,953; Referee: Shona Shukrula (Netherlands)

==== 2024 Summer Olympics ====
===== 2024 Summer Olympics Group B =====
Pos	Team	Pld	W	D	L	GF	GA	GD	Pts	Qualification
1	United States	3	3	0	0	9	2	+7	9	Advance to knockout stage
2	Germany	3	2	0	1	8	5	+3	6	Advance to knockout stage
3	Australia	3	1	0	2	7	10	−3	3	
4	Zambia	3	0	0	3	6	13	−7	0	

Source: FIFA

===== 2024 Summer Olympics fixtures and results =====
25 July 2024 Group B	Germany	3–0	Australia	Marseille, France
19:00 (19:00 UTC+2)	Hegering 24'; Schüller 64'; Brand 68'	Report		Stadium: Stade de Marseille; Attendance: 9,731; Referee: Katia García (Mexico)

28 July 2024 Group B	United States	4–1	Germany	Marseille, France
21:00 (21:00 UTC+2)	Smith 11', 44'; Swanson 26'; Williams 89'	Report	Gwinn 22'	Stadium: Stade de Marseille; Attendance: 12,845; Referee: Yael Falcón (Argentina)

31 July 2024 Group B	Zambia	1–4	Germany	Saint-Étienne, France
19:00 (19:00 UTC+2)	B. Banda 49'	Report	Schüller 10', 61'; Bühl 47'; Senß 90+5'	Stadium: Stade Geoffroy-Guichard; Attendance: 2,642; Referee: Yoshimi Yamashita (Japan)

3 August 2024 Quarter-finals	Canada	0–0 (a.e.t.) (2–4 p)	Germany	Marseille, France
19:00 (19:00 UTC+2)		Report		Stadium: Stade de Marseille; Attendance: 12,517; Referee: Edina Alves Batista (Brazil)
	Penalties
	Quinn (penalty scored); Lawrence (penalty missed); Leon (penalty missed); Beckie (penalty scored)		(penalty scored) Gwinn; (penalty scored) Minge; (penalty missed) Lohmann; (penalty scored) Rauch; (penalty scored) Berger

6 August 2024 Semi-finals	United States	1–0 (a.e.t.)	Germany	Décines-Charpieu, France
18:00 (18:00 UTC+2)	Smith 95'	Report		Stadium: Stade de Lyon; Attendance: 11,716; Referee: Bouchra Karboubi (Morocco)

9 August 2024 Bronze medal match	Spain	0–1	Germany	Décines-Charpieu, France
15:00 (15:00 UTC+2)		Report	Gwinn 64' (pen.)	Stadium: Stade de Lyon; Referee: Katia García (Mexico)

==== 2025 UEFA Women's Nations League ====
===== 2025 UEFA Women's Nations League A Group 1 =====
Pos	Team	Pld	W	D	L	GF	GA	GD	Pts	Qualification or relegation	(Germany)	(Netherlands)	(Austria)	(Scotland)
1	Germany	6	5	1	0	26	4	+22	16	Qualification for Nations League Finals	—	4–0	4–1	6–1
2	Netherlands	6	3	2	1	11	10	+1	11		2–2	—	3–1	1–1
3	Austria (O)	6	2	0	4	5	16	−11	6	Qualification for relegation play-offs	0–6	1–3	—	1–0
4	Scotland (R)	6	0	1	5	3	15	−12	1	Relegation to League B	0–4	1–2	0–1	—

Source: UEFA
Rules for classification: Tiebreakers
(O) Play-off winners; (R) Relegated

====== 2025 UEFA Women's Nations League fixtures and results ======
21 February 2025 2025 Nations League	Netherlands	2–2	Germany	Breda
20:45 (20:45 UTC+1)	Beerensteyn 13', 66'	Report	Schüller 45+1'; Nüsken 50'	Stadium: Rat Verlegh Stadion; Attendance: 11,013; Referee: Maria Sole Ferrieri Caputi (Italy)

25 February 2025 2025 Nations League	Germany	4–1	Austria	Nuremberg
18:15 (18:15 UTC+1)	Freigang 39'; Dallmann 55'; Hoffmann 70'; Endemann 82'	Report	Schasching 3'	Stadium: Max-Morlock-Stadion; Attendance: 14,394; Referee: Ivana Martinčić (Croatia)

4 April 2025 2025 Nations League	Scotland	0–4	Germany	Dundee
20:35 (19:35 UTC+1)		Report	Senß 2'; Howard 21' (o.g.); Zicai 57'; Schüller 59'	Stadium: Tannadice Park; Attendance: 6,172; Referee: Tess Olofsson (Sweden)

8 April 2025 2025 Nations League	Germany	6–1	Scotland	Wolfsburg
17:45 (17:45 UTC+2)	Cerci 51', 57', 76'; Hoffmann 64', 65'; Freigang 67'	Report	Weir 41'	Stadium: Volkswagen Arena; Attendance: 16,102; Referee: Jana Adámková (Czech Republic)

30 May 2025 2025 Nations League	Germany	4–0	Netherlands	Bremen
20:30 (20:30 UTC+2)	Dallmann 9'; Schüller 25', 48'; Linder 45'	Report		Stadium: Weserstadion; Attendance: 32,398; Referee: Alina Peșu (Romania)

3 June 2025 2025 Nations League	Austria	0–6	Germany	Vienna
20:30 (20:30 UTC+2)		Report	Lohmann 1', 39'; Schüller 9'; Cerci 26'; Bühl 31'; Freigang 43'	Stadium: Viola Park; Attendance: 5,150; Referee: Ivana Projkovska (North Macedonia)

==== Friendly matches ====
25 October 2024 Friendly	England	3–4	Germany	London
20:30 (19:30 UTC+1)	Stanway 33', 36'; Bronze 81'	Report	Gwinn 3', 11'; Bühl 29'; Däbritz 72'	Stadium: Wembley Stadium; Attendance: 47,967; Referee: Marta Huerta de Aza (Spain)

28 October 2024 Friendly	Germany	1–2	Australia	Duisburg
18:10 (18:10 UTC+1)	Cerci 5'	Report	Cooney-Cross 39'; Hunt 77'	Stadium: MSV-Arena; Attendance: 26,633; Referee: Maria Marotta (Italy)

29 November 2024 Friendly	Switzerland	0–6	Germany	Zurich
20:00 (20:00 UTC+1)		Report	Nüsken 43'; Freigang 50', 65'; Schüller 56', 90+1'; Zicai 73'	Stadium: Letzigrund; Attendance: 17,306; Referee: Zulema González González (Spain)

2 December 2024 Friendly	Germany	1–2	Italy	Bochum
20:30 (20:30 UTC+1)	Rauch 11'	Report	Bonfantini 11'; Cantore 74'	Stadium: Ruhrstadion; Attendance: 15,125; Referee: Stéphanie Frappart (France)

== League season ==
=== Men ===
==== Bundesliga ====
===== Bundesliga standings =====
Pos	Team	Pld	W	D	L	GF	GA	GD	Pts	Qualification or relegation
1	Bayern Munich (C)	34	25	7	2	99	32	+67	82	Qualification for the Champions League league phase
2	Bayer Leverkusen	34	19	12	3	72	43	+29	69	Qualification for the Champions League league phase
3	Eintracht Frankfurt	34	17	9	8	68	46	+22	60	Qualification for the Champions League league phase
4	Borussia Dortmund	34	17	6	11	71	51	+20	57	Qualification for the Champions League league phase
5	SC Freiburg	34	16	7	11	49	53	−4	55	Qualification for the Europa League league phase
6	Mainz 05	34	14	10	10	55	43	+12	52	Qualification for the Conference League play-off round
7	RB Leipzig	34	13	12	9	53	48	+5	51	
8	Werder Bremen	34	14	9	11	54	57	−3	51	
9	VfB Stuttgart	34	14	8	12	64	53	+11	50	Qualification for the Europa League league phase (Note: VfB Stuttgart qualified for the Europa League league phase by winning the 2024–25 DFB-Pokal.)
10	Borussia Mönchengladbach	34	13	6	15	55	57	−2	45	
11	VfL Wolfsburg	34	11	10	13	56	54	+2	43	
12	FC Augsburg	34	11	10	13	35	51	−16	43	
13	Union Berlin	34	10	10	14	35	51	−16	40	
14	FC St. Pauli	34	8	8	18	28	41	−13	32	
15	TSG Hoffenheim	34	7	11	16	46	68	−22	32	
16	1. FC Heidenheim (O)	34	8	5	21	37	64	−27	29	Qualification for the relegation play-offs
17	Holstein Kiel (R)	34	6	7	21	49	80	−31	25	Relegation to 2. Bundesliga
18	VfL Bochum (R)	34	6	7	21	33	67	−34	25	Relegation to 2. Bundesliga

Source: Bundesliga
Rules for classification: 1) Points; 2) Goal difference; 3) Goals scored; 4) Head-to-head results; 5) Head-to-head away goals scored; 6) Away goals scored; 7) Play-off.
(Rules 4–6 only apply after home and away matches have been played between the tied teams.)
(C) Champions; (O) Play-off winners; (R) Relegated

==== 2. Bundesliga ====
===== 2. Bundesliga standings =====
Pos	Team	Pld	W	D	L	GF	GA	GD	Pts	Promotion, qualification or relegation
1	1. FC Köln (C, P)	34	18	7	9	53	38	+15	61	Promotion to Bundesliga
2	Hamburger SV (P)	34	16	11	7	78	44	+34	59	Promotion to Bundesliga
3	SV Elversberg	34	16	10	8	64	37	+27	58	Qualification for promotion play-offs
4	SC Paderborn	34	15	10	9	56	46	+10	55	
5	1. FC Magdeburg	34	14	11	9	64	52	+12	53	
6	Fortuna Düsseldorf	34	14	11	9	57	52	+5	53	
7	1. FC Kaiserslautern	34	15	8	11	56	55	+1	53	
8	Karlsruher SC	34	14	10	10	57	55	+2	52	
9	Hannover 96	34	13	12	9	41	36	+5	51	
10	1. FC Nürnberg	34	14	6	14	60	57	+3	48	
11	Hertha BSC	34	12	8	14	49	51	−2	44	
12	Darmstadt 98	34	11	9	14	56	55	+1	42	
13	Greuther Fürth	34	10	9	15	45	59	−14	39	
14	Schalke 04	34	10	8	16	52	62	−10	38	
15	Preußen Münster	34	8	12	14	40	43	−3	36	
16	Eintracht Braunschweig (O)	34	8	11	15	38	64	−26	35	Qualification for relegation play-offs
17	SSV Ulm (R)	34	6	12	16	36	48	−12	30	Relegation to 3. Liga
18	Jahn Regensburg (R)	34	6	7	21	23	71	−48	25	Relegation to 3. Liga

Source: Bundesliga
Rules for classification: 1) Points; 2) Goal difference; 3) Goals scored; 4) Head-to-head results; 5) Head-to-head away goals scored; 6) Away goals scored; 7) Play-off.
(Rules 4–6 only apply after home and away matches have been played between the tied teams.)
(C) Champions; (O) Play-off winners; (P) Promoted; (R) Relegated

==== 3. Liga ====
===== 3. Liga standings =====
Pos	Team	Pld	W	D	L	GF	GA	GD	Pts	Promotion, qualification or relegation
1	Arminia Bielefeld (C, P)	38	21	9	8	64	36	+28	72	Promotion to 2. Bundesliga and qualification for DFB-Pokal
2	Dynamo Dresden (P)	38	20	10	8	71	40	+31	70	Promotion to 2. Bundesliga and qualification for DFB-Pokal
3	1. FC Saarbrücken	38	18	11	9	59	47	+12	65	Qualification for promotion play-offs and DFB-Pokal
4	Energie Cottbus	38	18	8	12	64	54	+10	62	Qualification for DFB-Pokal
5	Hansa Rostock	38	18	6	14	54	46	+8	60	
6	Viktoria Köln	38	18	5	15	59	48	+11	59	
7	SC Verl	38	15	12	11	62	55	+7	57	
8	Rot-Weiss Essen	38	16	8	14	55	54	+1	56	
9	Wehen Wiesbaden	38	15	10	13	59	60	−1	55	
10	FC Ingolstadt	38	14	12	12	72	63	+9	54	
11	1860 Munich	38	15	8	15	57	61	−4	53	
12	Alemannia Aachen	38	12	14	12	44	44	0	50	
13	Erzgebirge Aue	38	15	5	18	52	65	−13	50	
14	VfL Osnabrück	38	13	9	16	46	55	−9	48	
15	VfB Stuttgart II (Note: Reserve teams are ineligible for promotion or DFB-Pokal qualification.)	38	12	11	15	49	59	−10	47	
16	Waldhof Mannheim	38	11	13	14	43	45	−2	46	
17	Borussia Dortmund II (R)	38	11	10	17	53	60	−7	43	Relegation to Regionalliga
18	Hannover 96 II (R)	38	9	10	19	51	70	−19	37	Relegation to Regionalliga
19	SV Sandhausen (R)	38	9	8	21	49	69	−20	35	Relegation to Regionalliga
20	SpVgg Unterhaching (R)	38	4	13	21	40	72	−32	25	Relegation to Regionalliga

Source: DFB
Rules for classification: 1) Points; 2) Goal difference; 3) Goals scored; 4) Head-to-head results; 5) Head-to-head away goals scored; 6) Away goals scored; 7) Play-off.
(C) Champions; (P) Promoted; (R) Relegated

=== Women ===
==== Frauen-Bundesliga ====
===== Frauen-Bundesliga standings =====
Pos	Team	Pld	W	D	L	GF	GA	GD	Pts	Qualification or relegation
1	Bayern Munich (C)	22	19	2	1	56	13	+43	59	Qualification for Champions League league stage
2	VfL Wolfsburg	22	16	3	3	57	18	+39	51	Qualification for Champions League league stage
3	Eintracht Frankfurt	22	16	2	4	68	22	+46	50	Qualification for Champions League second round
4	Bayer Leverkusen	22	13	4	5	38	21	+17	43	
5	SC Freiburg	22	11	5	6	34	31	+3	38	
6	TSG Hoffenheim	22	12	0	10	49	30	+19	36	
7	Werder Bremen	22	9	2	11	28	39	−11	29	
8	RB Leipzig	22	8	3	11	30	40	−10	27	
9	SGS Essen	22	5	5	12	21	30	−9	20	
10	1. FC Köln	22	3	5	14	18	51	−33	14	
11	Carl Zeiss Jena	22	2	4	16	7	43	−36	10	
12	Turbine Potsdam (R)	22	0	1	21	5	73	−68	1	Relegation to the 2. Frauen-Bundesliga

Source: DFB
Rules for classification: 1) Points; 2) Goal difference; 3) Goals scored; 4) Head-to-head results; 5) Head-to-head away goals scored; 6) Away goals scored; 7) Play-off.
(C) Champions; (R) Relegated

==== 2. Frauen-Bundesliga ====
===== 2. Frauen-Bundesliga standings =====
Pos	Team	Pld	W	D	L	GF	GA	GD	Pts	Qualification or relegation
1	Union Berlin (C, P)	26	19	5	2	71	17	+54	62	Promotion to Bundesliga
2	1. FC Nürnberg (P)	26	20	2	4	62	24	+38	62	Promotion to Bundesliga
3	Hamburger SV (P)	26	15	8	3	50	15	+35	53	Promotion to Bundesliga
4	SC Sand	26	14	5	7	66	46	+20	47	
5	SV Meppen	26	13	4	9	40	29	+11	43	
6	Eintracht Frankfurt II (Note: Reserve teams cannot compete in the Frauen-Bundesliga and are therefore ineligible for promotion.)	26	13	4	9	29	25	+4	43	
7	VfL Bochum	26	11	5	10	40	40	0	38	
8	FC Ingolstadt	26	10	5	11	41	43	−2	35	
9	Borussia Mönchengladbach	26	8	5	13	33	41	−8	29	
10	Bayern Munich II	26	6	6	14	30	45	−15	24	
11	SG Andernach	26	7	3	16	23	54	−31	24	
12	SV 67 Weinberg (R)	26	5	5	16	22	62	−40	20	Relegation to Regionalliga
13	SC Freiburg II (R)	26	5	3	18	21	45	−24	18	Relegation to Regionalliga
14	FSV Gütersloh (R)	26	5	2	19	29	71	−42	17	Relegation to Regionalliga

Source: DFB
Rules for classification: 1) Points; 2) Goal difference; 3) Goals scored; 4) Head-to-head results; 5) Head-to-head away goals scored; 6) Away goals scored; 7) Play-off.
(C) Champions; (P) Promoted; (R) Relegated

== Cup competitions ==
=== Men ===
==== DFB-Pokal ====
===== Final =====
24 May 2025
20:00 CEST

Arminia Bielefeld	2–4	VfB Stuttgart
Kania 82'; Vagnoman 85' (o.g.)	Report	Woltemade 15'; Millot 22', 66'; Undav 28'

Olympiastadion, Berlin
Attendance: 74,036
Referee: Christian Dingert (Lebecksmühle)

==== DFL-Supercup ====
17 August 2024
20:30 CEST

Bayer Leverkusen	2–2	VfB Stuttgart
Boniface 11'; Schick 88'	Report	Millot 15'; Undav 63'
Penalties
Schick (penalty scored); Grimaldo (penalty scored); García (penalty scored); Tapsoba (penalty scored)	4–3	(penalty scored) Millot; (penalty scored) Demirović; (penalty missed) Krätzig; (penalty scored) Undav; (penalty missed) Silas

BayArena, Leverkusen
Attendance: 30,210
Referee: Tobias Stieler (Hamburg)

=== Women ===
==== DFB-Pokal Frauen ====
1 May 2025
16:00

Bayern Munich	4–2	Werder Bremen
Schüller 6', 65', 79'; Simon 30'	Report	Dieckmann 45+2'; Mühlhaus 90+3'

RheinEnergieStadion, Cologne
Attendance: 45,146
Referee: Annika Kost

==== DFB-Supercup Frauen ====
25 August 2024
18:15 CEST (UTC+2)

Bayern Munich	1–0	VfL Wolfsburg
Bühl 9'	Report

Rudolf-Harbig-Stadion, Dresden
Attendance: 16,690
Referee: Fabienne Michel

== International competitions ==
=== FIFA Club World Cup ===
==== Group stage ====
===== Group C =====
Pos	Team	Pld	W	D	L	GF	GA	GD	Pts	Qualification
1	(Portugal) Benfica	3	2	1	0	9	2	+7	7	Advance to knockout stage
2	(Germany) Bayern Munich	3	2	0	1	12	2	+10	6	Advance to knockout stage
3	(Argentina) Boca Juniors	3	0	2	1	4	5	−1	2	
4	(New Zealand) Auckland City	3	0	1	2	1	17	−16	1	

Source: FIFA

===== Group F =====
Pos	Team	Pld	W	D	L	GF	GA	GD	Pts	Qualification
1	(Germany) Borussia Dortmund	3	2	1	0	5	3	+2	7	Advance to knockout stage
2	(Brazil) Fluminense	3	1	2	0	4	2	+2	5	Advance to knockout stage
3	(South Africa) Mamelodi Sundowns	3	1	1	1	4	4	0	4	
4	(South Korea) Ulsan HD	3	0	0	3	2	6	−4	0	

Source: FIFA

==== Knockout stage ====
===== Round of 16 =====
29 June 2025	Flamengo (Brazil)	2–4	(Germany) Bayern Munich	Miami Gardens, United States
4:00 pm EDT	Gerson 33'; Jorginho 55' (pen.)	Report	Pulgar 6' (o.g.); Kane 9', 73'; Goretzka 41'	Stadium: Hard Rock Stadium; Attendance: 60,914; Referee: Michael Oliver (England)

1 July 2025	Borussia Dortmund (Germany)	2–1	(Mexico) Monterrey	Atlanta, United States
9:00 pm EDT	Guirassy 14', 24'	Report	Berterame 48'	Stadium: Mercedes-Benz Stadium; Referee: Facundo Tello (Argentina)

===== Quarter-finals =====
5 July 2025	Paris Saint-Germain (France)	2–0	(Germany) Bayern Munich	Atlanta, United States
12:00 pm EDT	Doué 78'; Dembélé 90+6'	Report		Stadium: Mercedes-Benz Stadium; Attendance: 66,937; Referee: Anthony Taylor (England)

5 July 2025	Real Madrid (Spain)	3–2	(Germany) Borussia Dortmund	East Rutherford, United States
4:00 pm EDT	G. García 10'; F. García 20'; Mbappé 90+4'	Report	Beier 90+3'; Guirassy 90+8' (pen.)	Stadium: MetLife Stadium; Attendance: 76,611; Referee: Ramon Abatti (Brazil)

== German clubs in Europe ==
=== UEFA Champions League ===
==== League phase ====
===== Bayer Leverkusen =====
Pos	Team	Pld	W	D	L	GF	GA	GD	Pts	Qualification
4	(Italy) Inter Milan	8	6	1	1	11	1	+10	19	Advance to round of 16 (seeded)
5	(Spain) Atlético Madrid	8	6	0	2	20	12	+8	18	Advance to round of 16 (seeded)
6	(Germany) Bayer Leverkusen	8	5	1	2	15	7	+8	16	Advance to round of 16 (seeded)
7	(France) Lille	8	5	1	2	17	10	+7	16	Advance to round of 16 (seeded)
8	(England) Aston Villa	8	5	1	2	13	6	+7	16	Advance to round of 16 (seeded)

Source: UEFA
Rules for classification: League phase tiebreakers

Home team	Score	Away team
Feyenoord (Netherlands)	0–4	(Germany) Bayer Leverkusen
Bayer Leverkusen (Germany)	1–0	(Italy) Milan
Brest (France)	1–1	(Germany) Bayer Leverkusen
Liverpool (England)	4–0	(Germany) Bayer Leverkusen
Bayer Leverkusen (Germany)	5–0	(Austria) Red Bull Salzburg
Bayer Leverkusen (Germany)	1–0	(Italy) Inter Milan
Atlético Madrid (Spain)	2–1	(Germany) Bayer Leverkusen
Bayer Leverkusen (Germany)	2–0	(Czech Republic) Sparta Prague

===== Bayern Munich =====
Pos	Team	Pld	W	D	L	GF	GA	GD	Pts	Qualification
10	(Germany) Borussia Dortmund	8	5	0	3	22	12	+10	15	Advance to knockout phase play-offs (seeded)
11	(Spain) Real Madrid	8	5	0	3	20	12	+8	15 (Note: Tied on points (15), goal difference (+8), goals scored (20), away goals (6) and wins (5). Ranked on away wins: Real Madrid 2, Bayern Munich 1.)	Advance to knockout phase play-offs (seeded)
12	(Germany) Bayern Munich	8	5	0	3	20	12	+8	15	Advance to knockout phase play-offs (seeded)
13	(Italy) Milan	8	5	0	3	14	11	+3	15	Advance to knockout phase play-offs (seeded)
14	(Netherlands) PSV Eindhoven	8	4	2	2	16	12	+4	14	Advance to knockout phase play-offs (seeded)

Source: UEFA
Rules for classification: League phase tiebreakers
Notes:

Home team	Score	Away team
Bayern Munich (Germany)	9–2	(Croatia) Dinamo Zagreb
Aston Villa (England)	1–0	(Germany) Bayern Munich
Barcelona (Spain)	4–1	(Germany) Bayern Munich
Bayern Munich (Germany)	1–0	(Portugal) Benfica
Bayern Munich (Germany)	1–0	(France) Paris Saint-Germain
Shakhtar Donetsk (Ukraine)	1–5	(Germany) Bayern Munich
Feyenoord (Netherlands)	3–0	(Germany) Bayern Munich
Bayern Munich (Germany)	3–1	(Slovakia) Slovan Bratislava

===== Borussia Dortmund =====
Pos	Team	Pld	W	D	L	GF	GA	GD	Pts	Qualification
8	(England) Aston Villa	8	5	1	2	13	6	+7	16	Advance to round of 16 (seeded)
9	(Italy) Atalanta	8	4	3	1	20	6	+14	15	Advance to knockout phase play-offs (seeded)
10	(Germany) Borussia Dortmund	8	5	0	3	22	12	+10	15	Advance to knockout phase play-offs (seeded)
11	(Spain) Real Madrid	8	5	0	3	20	12	+8	15 (Note: Tied on points (15), goal difference (+8), goals scored (20), away goals (6) and wins (5). Ranked on away wins: Real Madrid 2, Bayern Munich 1.)	Advance to knockout phase play-offs (seeded)
12	(Germany) Bayern Munich	8	5	0	3	20	12	+8	15	Advance to knockout phase play-offs (seeded)

Source: UEFA
Rules for classification: League phase tiebreakers
Notes:

Home team	Score	Away team
Club Brugge (Belgium)	0–3	(Germany) Borussia Dortmund
Borussia Dortmund (Germany)	7–1	(Scotland) Celtic
Real Madrid (Spain)	5–2	(Germany) Borussia Dortmund
Borussia Dortmund (Germany)	1–0	(Austria) Sturm Graz
Dinamo Zagreb (Croatia)	0–3	(Germany) Borussia Dortmund
Borussia Dortmund (Germany)	2–3	(Spain) Barcelona
Bologna (Italy)	2–1	(Germany) Borussia Dortmund
Borussia Dortmund (Germany)	3–1	(Ukraine) Shakhtar Donetsk

===== RB Leipzig =====
Pos	Team	Pld	W	D	L	GF	GA	GD	Pts
30	(Austria) Sturm Graz	8	2	0	6	5	14	−9	6
31	(Czech Republic) Sparta Prague	8	1	1	6	7	21	−14	4
32	(Germany) RB Leipzig	8	1	0	7	8	15	−7	3
33	(Spain) Girona	8	1	0	7	5	13	−8	3
34	(Austria) Red Bull Salzburg	8	1	0	7	5	27	−22	3

Source: UEFA
Rules for classification: League phase tiebreakers

Home team	Score	Away team
Atlético Madrid (Spain)	2–1	(Germany) RB Leipzig
RB Leipzig (Germany)	2–3	(Italy) Juventus
RB Leipzig (Germany)	0–1	(England) Liverpool
Celtic (Scotland)	3–1	(Germany) RB Leipzig
Inter Milan (Italy)	1–0	(Germany) RB Leipzig
RB Leipzig (Germany)	2–3	(England) Aston Villa
RB Leipzig (Germany)	2–1	(Portugal) Sporting CP
Sturm Graz (Austria)	1–0	(Germany) RB Leipzig

===== VfB Stuttgart =====
Pos	Team	Pld	W	D	L	GF	GA	GD	Pts	Qualification
24	(Belgium) Club Brugge	8	3	2	3	7	11	−4	11	Advance to knockout phase play-offs (unseeded)
25	(Croatia) Dinamo Zagreb	8	3	2	3	12	19	−7	11	
26	(Germany) VfB Stuttgart	8	3	1	4	13	17	−4	10	
27	(Ukraine) Shakhtar Donetsk	8	2	1	5	8	16	−8	7	
28	(Italy) Bologna	8	1	3	4	4	9	−5	6	

Source: UEFA
Rules for classification: League phase tiebreakers

Home team	Score	Away team
Real Madrid (Spain)	3–1	(Germany) VfB Stuttgart
VfB Stuttgart (Germany)	1–1	(Czech Republic) Sparta Prague
Juventus (Italy)	0–1	(Germany) VfB Stuttgart
VfB Stuttgart (Germany)	0–2	(Italy) Atalanta
Red Star Belgrade (Serbia)	5–1	(Germany) VfB Stuttgart
VfB Stuttgart (Germany)	5–1	(Switzerland) Young Boys
Slovan Bratislava (Slovakia)	1–3	(Germany) VfB Stuttgart
VfB Stuttgart (Germany)	1–4	(France) Paris Saint-Germain

==== Knockout phase ====
===== Knockout phase play-offs =====
Team 1	Agg.	Team 2	1st leg	2nd leg
Celtic (Scotland)	2–3	(Germany) Bayern Munich	1–2	1–1
Sporting CP (Portugal)	0–3	(Germany) Borussia Dortmund	0–3	0–0

===== Round of 16 =====
Team 1	Agg.	Team 2	1st leg	2nd leg
Borussia Dortmund (Germany)	3–2	(France) Lille	1–1	2–1
Bayern Munich (Germany)	5–0	(Germany) Bayer Leverkusen	3–0	2–0

===== Quarter-finals =====
Team 1	Agg.	Team 2	1st leg	2nd leg
Barcelona (Spain)	5–3	(Germany) Borussia Dortmund	4–0	1–3
Bayern Munich (Germany)	3–4	(Italy) Inter Milan	1–2	2–2

=== UEFA Europa League ===
==== League phase ====
===== Eintracht Frankfurt =====
Pos	Team	Pld	W	D	L	GF	GA	GD	Pts	Qualification
3	(England) Manchester United	8	5	3	0	16	9	+7	18	Advance to round of 16 (seeded)
4	(England) Tottenham Hotspur	8	5	2	1	17	9	+8	17	Advance to round of 16 (seeded)
5	(Germany) Eintracht Frankfurt	8	5	1	2	14	10	+4	16	Advance to round of 16 (seeded)
6	(France) Lyon	8	4	3	1	16	8	+8	15	Advance to round of 16 (seeded)
7	(Greece) Olympiacos	8	4	3	1	9	3	+6	15	Advance to round of 16 (seeded)

Source: UEFA
Rules for classification: League phase tiebreakers

Home team	Score	Away team
Eintracht Frankfurt (Germany)	3–3	(Czech Republic) Viktoria Plzeň
Beşiktaş (Turkey)	1–3	(Germany) Eintracht Frankfurt
Eintracht Frankfurt (Germany)	1–0	(Latvia) RFS
Eintracht Frankfurt (Germany)	1–0	(Czech Republic) Slavia Prague
Midtjylland (Denmark)	1–2	(Germany) Eintracht Frankfurt
Lyon (France)	3–2	(Germany) Eintracht Frankfurt
Eintracht Frankfurt (Germany)	2–0	(Hungary) Ferencváros
Roma (Italy)	2–0	(Germany) Eintracht Frankfurt

===== TSG Hoffenheim =====
Pos	Team	Pld	W	D	L	GF	GA	GD	Pts
25	(Portugal) Braga	8	3	1	4	9	12	−3	10
26	(Sweden) IF Elfsborg	8	3	1	4	9	14	−5	10
27	(Germany) TSG Hoffenheim	8	2	3	3	11	14	−3	9
28	(Turkey) Beşiktaş	8	3	0	5	10	15	−5	9
29	(Israel) Maccabi Tel Aviv	8	2	0	6	8	17	−9	6

Source: UEFA
Rules for classification: League phase tiebreakers

Home team	Score	Away team
Midtjylland (Denmark)	1–1	(Germany) TSG Hoffenheim
TSG Hoffenheim (Germany)	2–0	(Ukraine) Dynamo Kyiv
Porto (Portugal)	2–0	(Germany) TSG Hoffenheim
TSG Hoffenheim (Germany)	2–2	(France) Lyon
Braga (Portugal)	3–0	(Germany) TSG Hoffenheim
TSG Hoffenheim (Germany)	0–0	(Romania) FCSB
TSG Hoffenheim (Germany)	2–3	(England) Tottenham Hotspur
Anderlecht (Belgium)	3–4	(Germany) TSG Hoffenheim

==== Knockout phase ====
===== Round of 16 =====
Team 1	Agg.	Team 2	1st leg	2nd leg
Ajax (Netherlands)	2–6	(Germany) Eintracht Frankfurt	1–2	1–4

===== Quarter-finals =====
Team 1	Agg.	Team 2	1st leg	2nd leg
Tottenham Hotspur (England)	2–1	(Germany) Eintracht Frankfurt	1–1	1–0

=== UEFA Conference League ===
==== Qualifying ====
===== Play-off round =====
Team 1	Agg.	Team 2	1st leg	2nd leg
BK Häcken (Sweden)	3–5	(Germany) 1. FC Heidenheim	1–2	2–3

==== League phase ====
===== 1. FC Heidenheim =====
Pos	Team	Pld	W	D	L	GF	GA	GD	Pts	Qualification
14	(Slovenia) Olimpija Ljubljana	6	3	1	2	7	6	+1	10	Advance to knockout phase play-offs (seeded)
15	(Spain) Real Betis	6	3	1	2	6	5	+1	10	Advance to knockout phase play-offs (seeded)
16	(Germany) 1. FC Heidenheim	6	3	1	2	7	7	0	10	Advance to knockout phase play-offs (seeded)
17	(Belgium) Gent	6	3	0	3	8	8	0	9	Advance to knockout phase play-offs (unseeded)
18	(Denmark) Copenhagen	6	2	2	2	8	9	−1	8	Advance to knockout phase play-offs (unseeded)

Source: UEFA
Rules for classification: League phase tiebreakers

Home team	Score	Away team
1. FC Heidenheim (Germany)	2–1	(Slovenia) Olimpija Ljubljana
Pafos (Cyprus)	0–1	(Germany) 1. FC Heidenheim
Heart of Midlothian (Scotland)	0–2	(Germany) 1. FC Heidenheim
1. FC Heidenheim (Germany)	0–2	(England) Chelsea
İstanbul Başakşehir (Turkey)	3–1	(Germany) 1. FC Heidenheim
1. FC Heidenheim (Germany)	1–1	(Switzerland) St. Gallen

==== Knockout phase ====
===== Knockout phase play-offs =====
Team 1	Agg.	Team 2	1st leg	2nd leg
Copenhagen (Denmark)	4–3	(Germany) 1. FC Heidenheim	1–2	3–1 (a.e.t.)

=== UEFA Women's Champions League ===
==== Qualifying rounds ====
===== Round 1 =====
====== Semi-finals ======
Team 1	Score	Team 2
Eintracht Frankfurt (Germany)	0–2	(Portugal) Sporting CP

====== Third-place play-off ======
Team 1	Score	Team 2
FC Minsk (Belarus)	0–6	(Germany) Eintracht Frankfurt

===== Round 2 =====
Team 1	Agg.	Team 2	1st leg	2nd leg
Fiorentina (Italy)	0–12	(Germany) VfL Wolfsburg	0–7	0–5

==== Group stage ====
===== Group A =====
Pos	Team	Pld	W	D	L	GF	GA	GD	Pts	Qualification	LYO	WOL	ROM	GAL
1	(France) Lyon	6	6	0	0	19	1	+18	18	Advance to quarter-finals	—	1–0	4–1	3–0
2	(Germany) VfL Wolfsburg	6	3	0	3	16	5	+11	9 (Note: Wolfsburg 3 Pts, +4 GD; Roma 3 Pts, −4 GD.)	Advance to quarter-finals	0–2	—	6–1	5–0
3	(Italy) Roma	6	3	0	3	12	14	−2	9		0–3	1–0	—	3–0
4	(Turkey) Galatasaray	6	0	0	6	1	28	−27	0		0–6	0–5	1–6	—

Source: UEFA
Rules for classification: Group stage tiebreakers

===== Group C =====
Pos	Team	Pld	W	D	L	GF	GA	GD	Pts	Qualification	ARS	BAY	JUV	VÅL
1	(England) Arsenal	6	5	0	1	17	9	+8	15	Advance to quarter-finals	—	3–2	1–0	4–1
2	(Germany) Bayern Munich	6	4	1	1	17	6	+11	13	Advance to quarter-finals	5–2	—	4–0	3–0
3	(Italy) Juventus	6	2	0	4	4	11	−7	6		0–4	0–2	—	3–0
4	(Norway) Vålerenga	6	0	1	5	3	15	−12	1		1–3	1–1	0–1	—

Source: UEFA
Rules for classification: Group stage tiebreakers

==== Knockout phase ====
===== Quarter-finals =====
Team 1	Agg.	Team 2	1st leg	2nd leg
Bayern Munich (Germany)	1–6	(France) Lyon	0–2	1–4
VfL Wolfsburg (Germany)	2–10	(Spain) Barcelona	1–4	1–6
