= Inga Schuldt =

German footballer (born 1997)

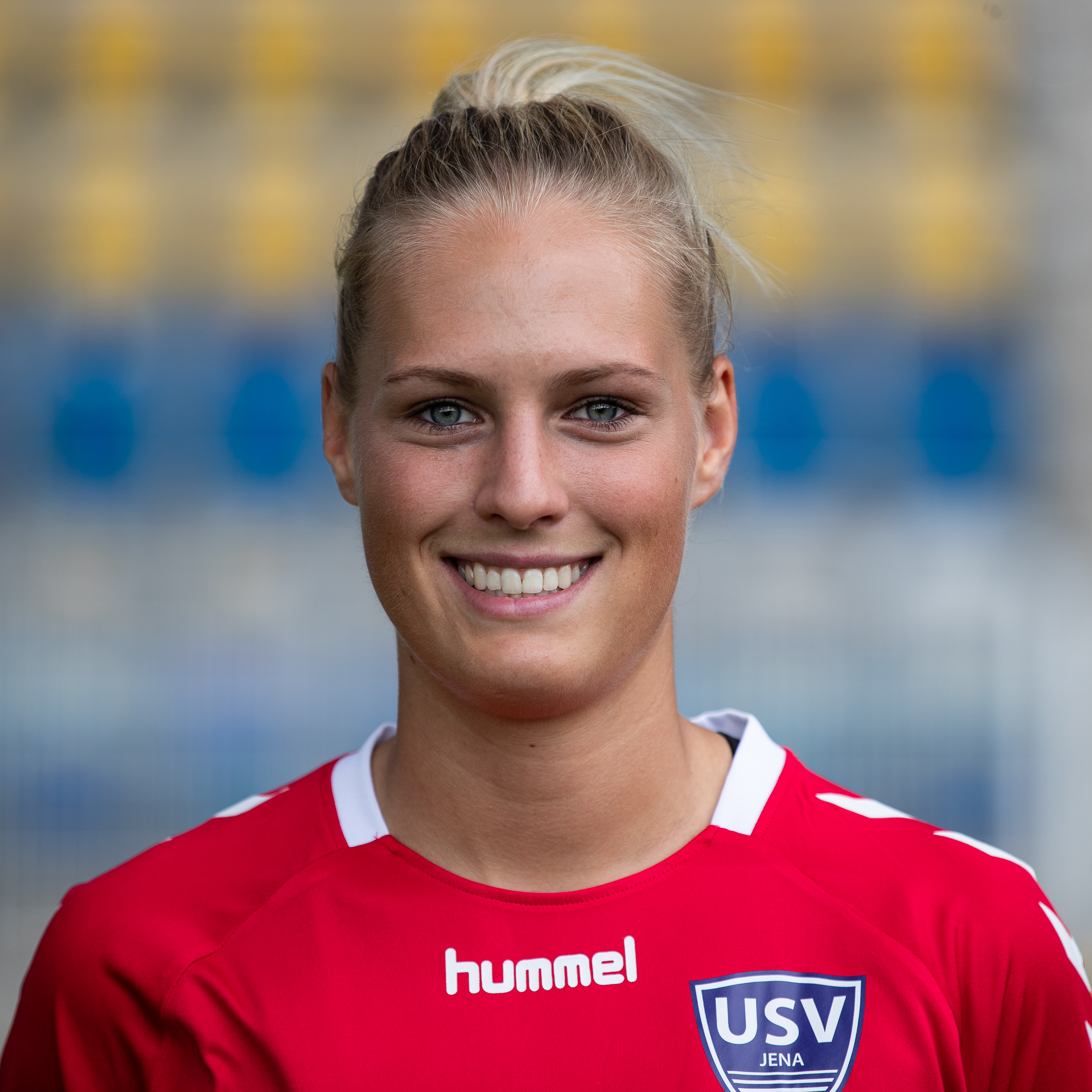
- Schuldt with FF USV Jena in 2019

Personal information
- Date of birth: 1 April 1997 (age 29)
- Place of birth: Rostock, Germany
- Height: 1.72 m (5 ft 8 in)
- Position: Goalkeeper

Team information
- Current team: 1. FC Köln
- Number: 31

Youth career
- SV Hafen Rostock 61
- SV 47 Rövershagen
- 2010–2012: 1. FC Neubrandenburg 04
- 2012–2014: 1. FFC Turbine Potsdam

Senior career*
Years	Team	Apps	(Gls)
2014–2019	1. FFC Turbine Potsdam II	66	(1)
2017–2019	1. FFC Turbine Potsdam	0	(0)
2019–2020	FF USV Jena	9	(0)
2020–2022	FC Carl Zeiss Jena	27	(0)
2022–2023	SC Sand	14	(0)
2023–2024	BSC YB	4	(0)
2024–2026	Hamburger SV	28	(0)
2025–2026	Hamburger SV II	4	(0)
2026–	1. FC Köln	0	(0)

International career
2015	Germany U19	1	(0)
- * Club domestic league appearances and goals as of 18:47, 9 October 2026 (UTC)

Inga Schuldt (born 1 April 1997) is a German professional footballer who plays as a goalkeeper for Frauen-Bundesliga club 1. FC Köln.

== Youth career ==
Schuldt was born in Rostock, Germany. She was introduced to football at an early age by her brother, who played locally for FC Hansa Rostock's youth teams. Schuldt started playing club soccer soon thereafter, first for SV Hafen Rostock 61 before joining SV 47 Rövershagen.

At the age of 12, she left home for the first time and started playing for 1. FC Neubrandenburg 04's academy, where she was introduced to goalkeeping. Three years later, Schuldt made the jump to 1. FFC Turbine Potsdam. In her time with the Turbine Potsdam youth teams, she contributed to two under-17 division titles and one second-place finish.

== Club career ==
In 2014, Schuldt began playing with Turbine Potsdam's second team in the 2. Frauen-Bundesliga. She amassed a total of 66 appearances in her 5 years with the squad. Despite playing as a goalkeeper, Schuldt also managed to score a goal in March 2016; her strike, which came against Holstein Kiel, was rewarded by Potsdam coaching staff with free ice cream purchased for both Schuldt and her teammates.

At the start of the 2017–18 season, Schuldt was promoted to Turbine Potsdam's first team. She later signed a contract extension in June 2018 to keep her with the squad for an additional year. However, in her two-year stint with the Potsdam senior squad, Schuldt was never called on to make a cameo with the senior squad.

In June 2019, Schuldt signed with FF USV Jena. She made 9 appearances in the team's first season following promotion to the Frauen-Bundesliga. Ultimately, with the club struggling both financially and in terms of results, USV Jena disbanded at the end of the season. Schuldt and her teammates were then passed on to FC Carl Zeiss Jena.

Schuldt missed the first game of the 2020–21 season due to a thigh injury. However, she regained fitness and made her Carl Zeiss Jena debut in the subsequent match, which was against her former club, Turbine Potsdam. Despite competition from Sarah Hornschuch, Schuldt was able to eventually become the team's clear starting goalkeeper. In her first season with Carl Zeiss Jena, she made 8 appearances in the 2. Frauen-Bundesliga en route to promotion to the Frauen-Bundesliga. Schuldt then re-signed with the club ahead of its first season in the German first division. She played in 19 league matches as Carl Zeiss Jena fell into last place and were sent back down to the 2. Frauen-Bundesliga.

On 24 May 2022, Schuldt signed with SC Sand, which had been relegated to the 2. Frauen Bundesliga alongside Carl Zeiss Jena. She spent one season with SC Sand before leaving Germany for the first time and joining Swiss side BSC YB. With starting goalkeeper Jara Ackermann taking up the lion's share of goalkeeper playing time, Schuldt recorded a career-low 4 league appearances as BSC YB finished at the top of the Swiss Women's Super League.

Schuldt returned to Germany and signed with second-division club Hamburger SV in June 2024. In her first season with the team, she helped HSV obtain promotion to the Frauen-Bundesliga ahead of the 2025–26 season. Schuldt was HSV's starting goalkeeper throughout the season, making 26 appearances across all competitions as the club finished 3rd in the 2. Frauen-Bundesliga standings. She also contributed to HSV's appearance in the knockout stages of the 2024–25 DFB-Pokal. During the team's round of 16 match, Schuldt conceded a goal after allowing a back pass to run beneath her foot and into the goal. However, Hamburger SV were able to win nevertheless and made it to the semifinals, where they were vanquished in extra time by SV Werder Bremen.

On 2 July 2026, it was announced that Schuldt has signed with 1. FC Köln.

== International career ==
On 11 February 2015, Schuldt made her debut with the Germany under-19 team, playing 45 minutes in a 7–3 win over Serbia.

== Career statistics ==
As of 23 April 2026

Appearances and goals by club, season and competition
Club	Season	League			National cup (Note: Includes DFB-Pokal)		Total	
Club	Season	Division	Apps	Goals	Apps	Goals	Apps	Goals
1. FFC Turbine Potsdam II	2014–15	2. Frauen-Bundesliga	8	0	—		8	0
1. FFC Turbine Potsdam II	2015–16	2. Frauen-Bundesliga	21	1	—		21	1
1. FFC Turbine Potsdam II	2016–17	2. Frauen-Bundesliga	11	0	—		11	0
1. FFC Turbine Potsdam II	2017–18	2. Frauen-Bundesliga	10	0	—		10	0
1. FFC Turbine Potsdam II	2018–19	2. Frauen-Bundesliga	16	0	—		16	0
1. FFC Turbine Potsdam II	Total		66	1	0	0	66	1
1. FFC Turbine Potsdam	2017–18	Frauen-Bundesliga	0	0	0	0	0	0
1. FFC Turbine Potsdam	2018–19	Frauen-Bundesliga	0	0	0	0	0	0
1. FFC Turbine Potsdam	Total		0	0	0	0	0	0
FF USV Jena	2019–20	Frauen-Bundesliga	9	0	0	0	9	0
FC Carl Zeiss Jena	2020–21	2. Frauen-Bundesliga	8	0	0	0	8	0
FC Carl Zeiss Jena	2021–22	Frauen-Bundesliga	19	0	1	0	20	0
FC Carl Zeiss Jena	Total		27	0	1	0	28	0
SC Sand	2022–23	2. Frauen-Bundesliga	14	0	1	0	15	0
BSC YB	2023–24	Women's Super League	4	0	—		4	0
Hamburger SV	2024–25	2. Frauen-Bundesliga	22	0	4	0	26	0
Hamburger SV	2025–26	Frauen-Bundesliga	6	0	0	0	6	0
Hamburger SV	Total		28	0	4	0	28	0
1. FC Köln	2026–27	Frauen-Bundesliga	0	0	0	0	0	0
Career total			148	1	6	0	154	1
