= 2011–12 Frauen-Bundesliga =

Frauen-Bundesliga
- Season: 2011–12
- Champions: 1. FFC Turbine Potsdam
- Relegated: Hamburger SV; 1. FC Lokomotive Leipzig
- UEFA Women's Champions League: 1. FFC Turbine Potsdam; VfL Wolfsburg
- Matches: 132
- Goals: 420 (3.18 per match)
- Top goalscorer: Genoveva Añonma (22)
- Biggest home win: 1. FFC Turbine Potsdam 8–0 1. FC Lokomotive Leipzig
- Biggest away win: 1. FC Lokomotive Leipzig 2–9 VfL Wolfsburg
- Highest scoring: 1. FC Lokomotive Leipzig 2–9 VfL Wolfsburg
- Highest attendance: VfL Wolfsburg – 1. FFC Frankfurt 8,689
- Lowest attendance: Hamburg – Jena 165
- Average attendance: 1,121

The 2011–12 season of the Frauen-Bundesliga is the 22nd season of Germany's premier women's football league. The season commenced on 21 August 2011 and will conclude on 28 May 2012. Turbine Potsdam were the defending champions and successfully defended their title on the last matchday. Potsdam became the first team to win Bundesliga title a fourth year in a row.

The start of the season saw Germany's record capped player Birgit Prinz ending her career and all-time Bundesliga topscorer Inka Grings leaving Duisburg after 16 years for Swiss side Zürich. A new all-time Bundesliga record was set on 20 May 2012 when 8,689 spectators saw the match VfL Wolfsburg versus 1. FFC Frankfurt.

== Teams ==
The teams promoted from the previous season's 2nd Bundesliga were Freiburg as winners of the Southern division and Lokomotive Leipzig as runners-up of the Northern division; Northern division champions Hamburger SV II as a reserve side were ineligible for promotion.

Locations of teams in the 2011–12 Bundesliga

Team	Home city	Home ground
SC 07 Bad Neuenahr	Bad Neuenahr-Ahrweiler	Apollinarisstadion
Bayer 04 Leverkusen	Leverkusen	Ulrich-Haberland-Stadion (Amateur)
FC Bayern Munich	Munich	Sportpark Aschheim
FCR 2001 Duisburg	Duisburg	PCC-Stadion
SG Essen-Schönebeck	Essen	Sportpark Am Hallo
1. FFC Frankfurt	Frankfurt	Stadion am Brentanobad
SC Freiburg	Freiburg	Möslestadion
Hamburger SV	Hamburg	Wolfgang-Meyer-Sportanlage
FF USV Jena	Jena	Sportzentrum Oberaue
1. FC Lokomotive Leipzig	Leipzig	Bruno-Plache-Stadion
1. FFC Turbine Potsdam	Potsdam	Karl-Liebknecht-Stadion
VfL Wolfsburg	Wolfsburg	VfL-Stadium

=== Managerial changes ===
Team	Outgoing manager	Manner of departure	Date of vacancy	Replaced by	Date of appointment	Position
Bad Neuenahr	Thomas Obliers	mutual consent	22 March 2011	Colin Bell	6 April 2010	pre-season
Lokomotive Leipzig	Jürgen Brauße	mutual consent	14 April 2011	Claudia von Lanken	15 April 2011	pre-season
Jena	Konrad Weise	end of contract	30 June 2011	Martina Voss-Tecklenburg	1 July 2011	pre-season
Lokomotive Leipzig	Claudia von Lanken	sacked	4 October 2011	Jürgen Brauße	4 October 2011	11th
Lokomotive Leipzig	Jürgen Brauße	resigned	18 April 2012	Christof Reimann	25 May 2012	11th

== League table ==
Pos	Team	Pld	W	D	L	GF	GA	GD	Pts	Qualification or relegation
1	1. FFC Turbine Potsdam (C)	22	18	2	2	63	10	+53	56	2012–13 UEFA Champions League round of 32
2	VfL Wolfsburg (P)	22	17	2	3	62	18	+44	53	2012–13 UEFA Champions League round of 32
3	1. FFC Frankfurt	22	15	1	6	58	17	+41	46	
4	FCR 2001 Duisburg	22	14	3	5	53	24	+29	45	
5	SG Essen-Schönebeck	22	9	4	9	30	28	+2	31	
6	FC Bayern Munich	22	8	4	10	29	38	−9	28	
7	SC 07 Bad Neuenahr	22	7	5	10	26	22	+4	26	
8	SC Freiburg	22	6	5	11	22	43	−21	23	
9	Hamburger SV (R)	22	5	7	10	23	40	−17	22	Relegation to 2012–13 Regionalliga (Note: Hamburg decided to withdraw their team from the first two Bundesligas for monetary reasons.)
10	FF USV Jena	22	5	3	14	16	46	−30	18	
11	Bayer 04 Leverkusen	22	4	3	15	22	55	−33	15	
12	1. FC Lokomotive Leipzig (R)	22	4	1	17	16	79	−63	13	Relegation to 2012–13 2. Bundesliga

Updated to match(es) played on 28 May 2012. Source: soccerway.com
Rules for classification: 1) points; 2) goal difference; 3) number of goals scored.
(C) Champions; (P) Promoted; (R) Relegated

== Results ==
Home \ Away	BAD	LEV	BAY	DUI	ESS	FRA	FRE	HAM	JEN	LEI	POT	WOL
Bad Neuenahr		0–2	0–1	2–0	2–3	1–3	2–2	1–0	0–1	5–0	0–2	1–3
Bayer Leverkusen	0–3		1–3	0–1	0–2	0–5	1–5	2–2	3–2	2–3	0–3	1–2
Bayern Munich	0–3	3–0		2–0	1–0	1–2	3–0	4–1	1–1	1–2	0–4	0–3
FCR 2001 Duisburg	2–0	4–1	3–1		4–0	1–1	2–2	3–1	3–0	2–1	0–2	3–0
Essen-Schönebeck	0–2	4–0	1–0	1–1		0–3	0–2	1–1	1–0	4–0	1–0	1–1
FFC Frankfurt	2–0	4–1	7–1	5–3	3–0		7–0	0–1	3–0	4–0	0–2	0–1
Freiburg	0–0	0–1	3–1	0–6	0–3	1–0		2–3	0–0	3–0	0–2	0–3
Hamburg	0–4	0–2	1–1	0–2	1–1	0–2	1–1		1–1	2–0	1–1	1–3
Jena	1–0	2–1	1–3	0–3	2–1	0–2	3–0	0–1		0–1	0–7	0–3
Lok Leipzig	0–2	1–4	2–2	1–6	0–4	0–4	0–1	0–3	2–1		0–7	2–9
Turbine Potsdam	1–0	1–1	3–0	2–3	3–2	3–1	2–0	4–0	3–1	8–0		1–0
Wolfsburg	1–1	5–1	3–0	2–1	2–0	1–0	3–0	5–2	7–0	5–1	0–2	

Updated to match(es) played on 28 May 2012. Source: kicker.de
Legend: Blue = home team win; Yellow = draw; Red = away team win.

== Top scorers ==
Genoveva Añonma won the topscorer award with 22 goals and became the first non-German player to win the award in Bundesliga history.

Player	Club	Goals
Genoveva Añonma	Turbine Potsdam	22
Conny Pohlers	Wolfsburg	19
Yuki Nagasato	Turbine Potsdam	12
Kerstin Garefrekes	FFC Frankfurt	11
Nadine Keßler	Wolfsburg	11
Celia Okoyino da Mbabi	Bad Neuenahr	11
Mandy Islacker	FCR Duisburg	10
