= Lisa Heiseler =

German footballer

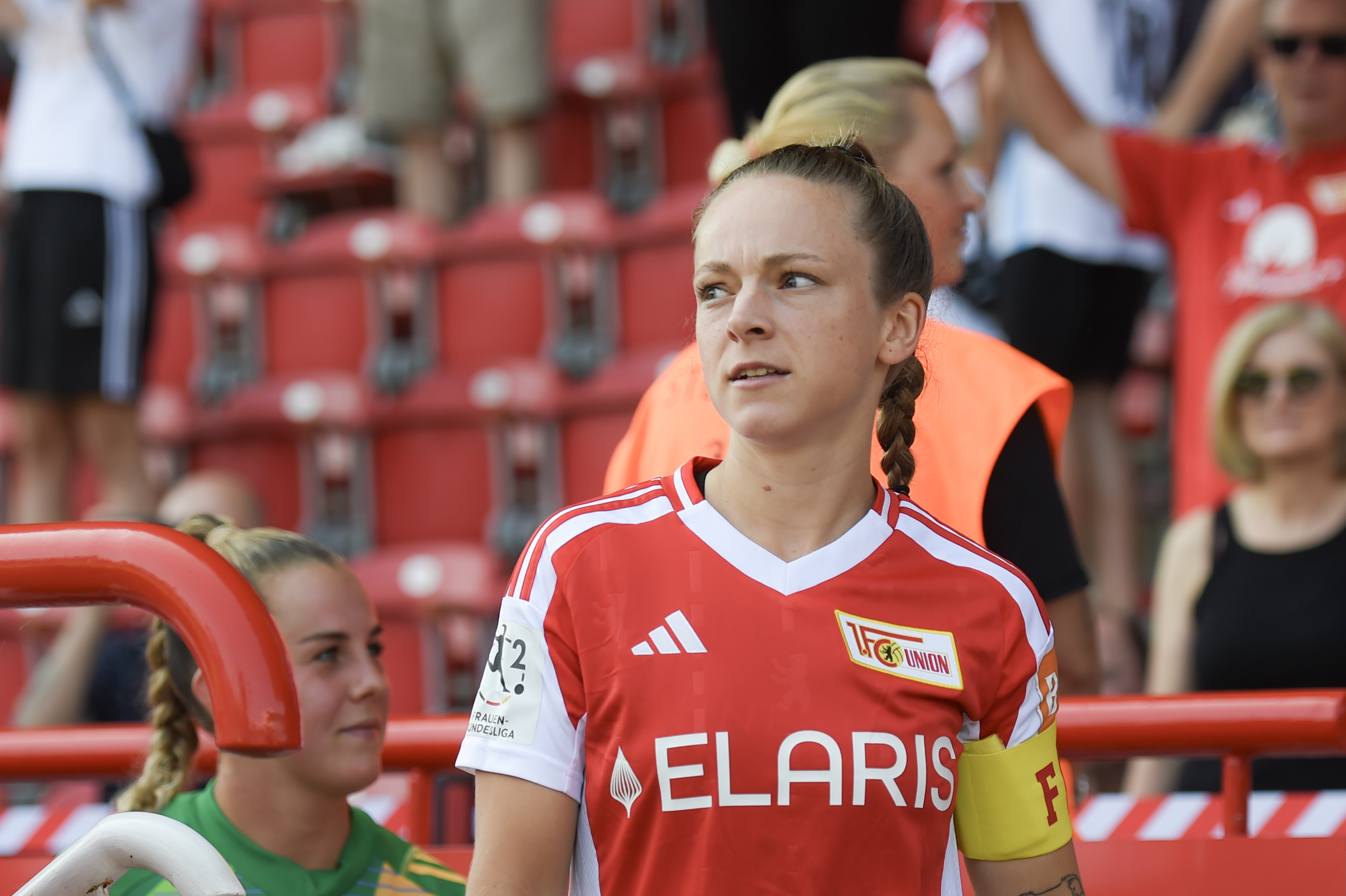
- Lisa Heiseler in 2024

Personal information
- Date of birth: 29 June 1998 (age 28)
- Place of birth: Berlin, Germany
- Height: 1.60 m (5 ft 3 in)
- Position: Midfielder

Team information
- Current team: 1. FC Union Berlin
- Number: 7

Youth career
- 2004–2012: Weißenseer FC
- 2012–2015: 1.FC Union Berlin

Senior career*
Years	Team	Apps	(Gls)
2016–	1. FC Union Berlin	182	(138)
- * Club domestic league appearances and goals as of 20 November 2026

Lisa Heiseler (born 8 January 1998) is a German footballer who plays as a Midfielder for 1. FC Union Berlin.

== Club career ==
Lisa Heiseler grew up in Weißensee and played for her local club, Weißenseer FC, from first grade onward. Since she was only allowed to play with boys until the U15 level, she transferred to the women's youth academy of 1. FC Union Berlin at the age of 13.

In the 2015/16 season, she played in three matches for the first team in the third-tier Regionalliga Nordost. Her senior debut on 10 April 2016, in a 5–0 home victory against FFV Leipzig II, was immediately crowned with her first goal, the opening goal in the 33rd minute. This contributed to the regional championship and promotion to the 2. Bundesliga. Following relegation and subsequent return to the Regionalliga Nordost, she played in this league until the end of the 2023/24 season, from which she once again won the regional championship and returned to the 2. Bundesliga. In the 2024/25 season, she scored 22 goals, including two hat tricks, and became the league's top scorer. This contributed to the team's 2025 second division championship and their first-ever promotion to the Bundesliga. Her Bundesliga debut came on the opening day of the season, 7 September 2025, in a 1–1 draw at home against fellow promoted side 1. FC Nürnberg. As captain, a position she has held since 2023, she also took responsibility, converting a penalty in the 41st minute to give her team a 1–0 lead and score the first Bundesliga goal in the club's history.

== Career highlights ==
1. FC Union Berlin

- 2.Bundesliga: 2024–25
