= Pauline Machtens =

German footballer (born 2002)

Personal information
- Full name: Pauline Annette Machtens
- Date of birth: 28 June 2002 (age 24)
- Place of birth: Hanover, Germany
- Height: 1.67 m (5 ft 6 in)
- Position: Midfielder

Team information
- Current team: Hamburger SV
- Number: 28

Youth career
- 2014–2019: Bayer Leverkusen

Senior career*
Years	Team	Apps	(Gls)
2019–2021	Bayer Leverkusen	10	(0)
2023–	Hamburger SV	79	(3)

International career^{‡}
2017	Germany U15	2	(0)
2021–2022	Germany U20	5	(1)
- * Club domestic league appearances and goals as of 21 November 2026 ‡ National team caps and goals as of 21 December 2025

Pauline Annette Machtens (born 28 June 2002) is a German footballer who plays as a midfielder for Hamburger SV in the Frauen-Bundesliga. She represented Germany at under-20 level, appearing at the 2022 FIFA Women's U-20 World Cup in Costa Rica and Panama.

== Club career ==
=== Bayer Leverkusen ===
Machtens grew up in Hanover and joined Bayer 04 Leverkusen's women's setup, making her senior debut in the Frauen-Bundesliga - Germany's top tier - in the 2019-20 season, aged 17, with 8 league appearances. She added a further 2 appearances the following season.

=== Syracuse University ===
Following her time at Leverkusen, Machtens moved to the United States to study and play college football at Syracuse University, combining her sporting and academic ambitions before returning to Germany in 2023.

=== Hamburger SV ===
On 1 July 2023, Machtens joined Hamburger SV, then competing in the 2. Frauen-Bundesliga, with the move facilitated by her former Leverkusen teammate Nina Brüggemann. She quickly established herself as a central midfielder and was appointed vice-captain.

In the 2024-25 season, Machtens made 20 league appearances and scored 2 goals, and stepped up to club captain during an injury absence of first-choice captain Sarah Stöckmann. She contributed across 24 competitive appearances in total (league and cup), registering 3 goals and 3 assists as Hamburger SV won promotion to the Frauen-Bundesliga by defeating SC Freiburg II 3–0 on Matchday 25 - a return to the top flight 13 years after the club had withdrawn their women's team. The club also reached the DFB-Pokal semi-final that season, losing to Werder Bremen 1–3 after extra time at the Volksparkstadion in front of a record 57,000 spectators - the largest attendance ever recorded for a club match in German women's football.

Prior to the 2025–26 season, Machtens extended her contract early and was officially named club captain, taking the armband from the departing Stöckmann. In the 2025–26 Frauen-Bundesliga campaign, she has made 20 league appearances alongside 2 cup appearances.

== International career ==
Machtens was called up to the Germany women's under-20 squad for the 2022 FIFA Women's U-20 World Cup, held in Costa Rica and Panama. She made 1 appearance at the tournament and also scored 1 goal in a friendly international for the Germany U20 side that cycle.

== Personal life ==
Machtens studied Sports science at the University of Hamburg.

== Career statistics ==
=== Club ===
As of match played 21 November 2026:

Appearances and goals by club, season and competition
Club	Season	League			National Cup		Total	
Club	Season	Division	Apps	Goals	Apps	Goals	Apps	Goals
Bayer Leverkusen	2019–20	Frauen-Bundesliga	8	0	1	0	9	0
Bayer Leverkusen	2020–21	Frauen-Bundesliga	2	0	—	—	2	0
Bayer Leverkusen	Total		10	0	1	0	11	0
Hamburger SV	2023–24	2. Frauen-Bundesliga	22	0	1	1	23	2
Hamburger SV	2024–25	2. Frauen-Bundesliga	20	2	4	1	20	2
Hamburger SV	2025–26	Frauen-Bundesliga	26	0	2	0	28	0
Hamburger SV	2026–27	Frauen-Bundesliga	11	2	2	0	13	2
Hamburger SV	Total		79	4	9	2	88	6
Career total			89	4	10	2	99	6
