= Claudia von Lanken =

German footballer and manager

Personal information
- Full name: Claudia von Lanken
- Date of birth: 3 June 1977 (age 49)
- Place of birth: Schleswig, Germany
- Position: Goalkeeper

Senior career*
Years	Team	Apps	(Gls)
- FFC Heike Rheine
1999–2005	Hamburger SV		

International career
1997–1998	Germany	3	(0)

Managerial career
- 2005–2011: Hamburger SV II
- 2011: Lokomotive Leipzig
- * Club domestic league appearances and goals

Claudia von Lanken is a German former football goalkeeper and current manager. Throughout her career she played for FFC Heike Rheine and Hamburger SV in Germany's Bundesliga. She played three matches for the German national team and was a reserve goalkeeper in the 1997 European Championship.

After retiring in 2005 she was appointed the coach of Hamburger SV's reserve team. In the 2010-11 season HSV II topped 2. Bundesliga's North group. However the reserve team was subsequently disbanded and von Lanken moved to Lokomotive Leipzig, which had been promoted to the Bundesliga. She was sacked after five weeks, with one win and four losses.

== Titles ==
- UEFA Women's Euro: 1997
