= Bernd Müller =

Bernd Müller may refer to:

- Bernd Müller (footballer, born 1949), German footballer
- Bernd Müller (footballer, born 1963), German footballer
- Bernd Müller (runner) (born 1967), German middle-distance runner and medalist at the 1985 European Athletics Junior Championships
