= Nina Räcke =

German football player (born 2001)

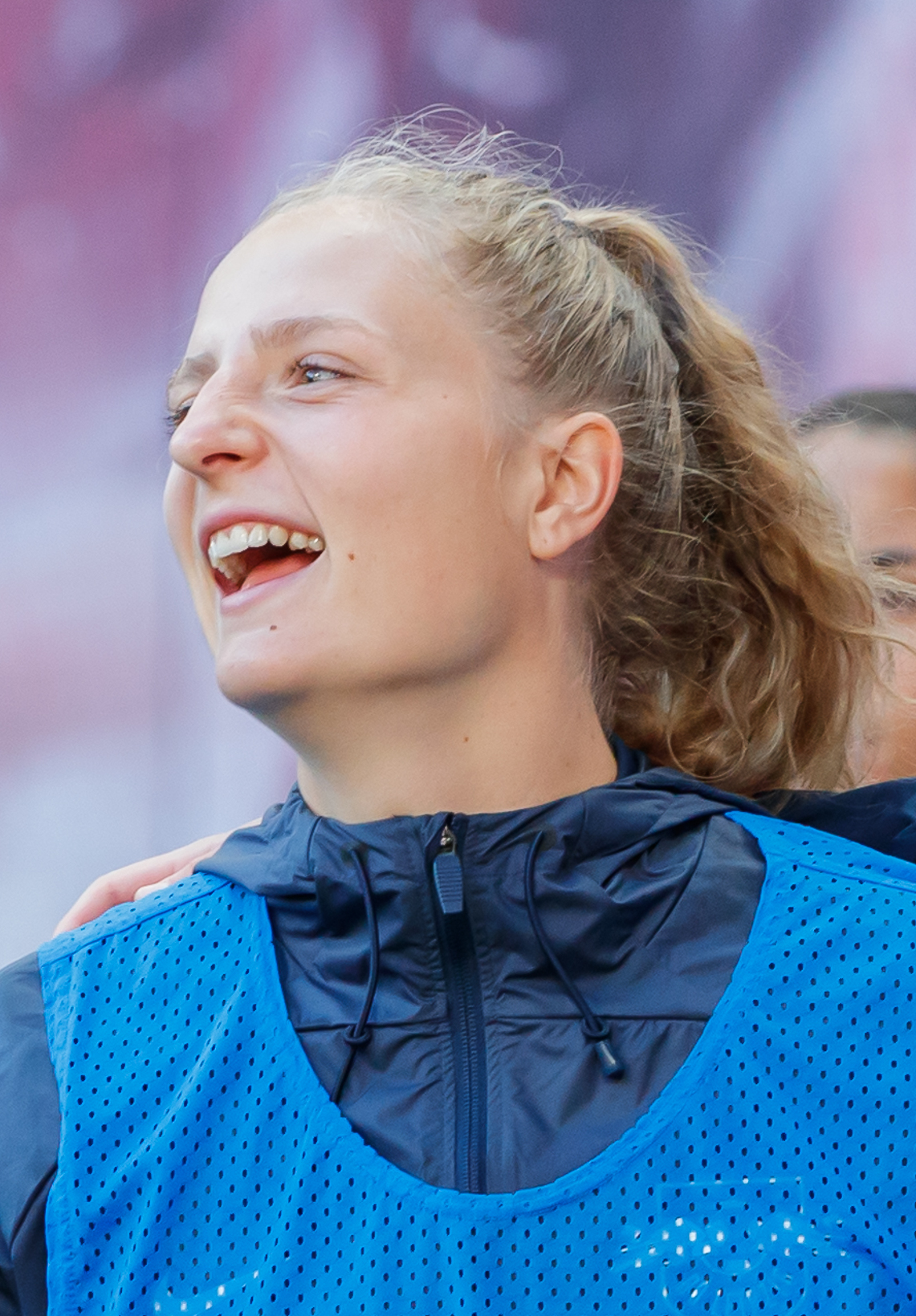
- Räcke with RB Leipzig in 2023

Personal information
- Date of birth: 17 September 2001 (age 25)
- Place of birth: Burg bei Magdeburg, Germany
- Height: 1.74 m (5 ft 9 in)
- Position: Centre-back

Team information
- Current team: Hamburger SV
- Number: 39

Youth career
- 2006–2014: SV Theeßen 1985
- 2014–2015: Burger BC 08
- 2015–2018: Magdeburger FFC

Senior career*
Years	Team	Apps	(Gls)
2018–2020	VfL Wolfsburg II	36	(1)
2020–2023	SGS Essen	52	(1)
2023–2025	RB Leipzig	29	(0)
2025–	Hamburger SV	16	(0)
2025–	Hamburger SV II	4	(0)

International career
2020	Germany U19	1	(0)
- * Club domestic league appearances and goals as of 25 October 2026

Nina Räcke (born 17 September 2001) is a German professional footballer who plays as a centre-back for Frauen-Bundesliga club Hamburger SV. She has previously played for RB Leipzig, SGS Essen, and VfL Wolfsburg II.

== Youth career ==
Räcke started playing football as a child, often with her two brothers, Moritz and Till. For 8 years, she played for the various youth teams of SV Theeßen before plying her trade as a member of Burger BC 08. With both clubs, she was the only girl. From 2015 to 2018, Räcke attended a sports boarding school in Magdeburg and played for Magdeburger FFC.

== Club career ==
From 2018 to 2020, Räcke played for VfL Wolfsburg's second team in the 2. Frauen-Bundesliga. She made 36 total appearances for the club across a two-year span.

At age 18, Räcke accomplished a personal dream of hers and moved up to the German first division for the first time; She signed a multi-year contract with SGS Essen on 2 April 2020. She spent three years with the club and accumulated ample playing time, garnering a total of 52 appearances. However, in the few months leading up to her departure, Räcke found herself benched in favor of Markus Högner's preferred centre-back duo of Jacqueline Meißner and Lena Ostermeier. Upon the expiry of her contract, she departed from the club in search of a new challenge.

Räcke joined the newly-promoted RB Leipzig in April 2023. In her first year, she helped the club reach the DFB-Pokal round of 16, where they faced TSG Hoffenheim; Räcke had previously expressed disappointment that the match had not been broadcast or televised. She finished her first campaign with Leipzig having appeared in 15 league matches. In the 2024–25 season, Räcke was not able to secure a starting role and ended up only starting in one of her 14 appearances. When the 2025 summer transfer window arrived, Räcke departed from RB Leipzig; although Räcke's contract lasted another year, Leipzig terminated her deal and rendered her free to leave.

On 15 May 2025, Räcke signed a two-year contract with Hamburger SV. She was the club's first signing of the summer as Hamburger SV prepared to return to the Frauen-Bundesliga after 13 years in lower leagues. It is Räcke's second time in a row signing with a team after its promotion to the German top-flight.

== International career ==
Räcke has previously played for the Germany under-19 national team. She made her debut for the squad in 2020, participating in a 2–0 defeat to Iceland.

== Personal life ==
Räcke has studied energy and water management since her time at SGS Essen. While playing for RB Leipzig, she split her time between football and her studies at Ruhr West University of Applied Sciences; Räcke often attended an internship at a local wastewater treatment plant on the same days as Leipzig trainings.

== Career statistics ==
As of 25 October 2026

Appearances and goals by club, season and competition
Club	Season	League			DFB-Pokal		Total	
Club	Season	Division	Apps	Goals	Apps	Goals	Apps	Goals
VfL Wolfsburg II	2018–19	2. Frauen-Bundesliga	22	0	—		22	0
VfL Wolfsburg II	2019–20	2. Frauen-Bundesliga	14	1	—		14	1
VfL Wolfsburg II	Total		36	1	0	0	36	1
SGS Essen	2020–21	Frauen-Bundesliga	19	0	0	0	19	0
SGS Essen	2021–22	Frauen-Bundesliga	19	1	3	0	22	1
SGS Essen	2022–23	Frauen-Bundesliga	14	0	2	0	16	0
SGS Essen	Total		52	1	5	0	57	1
RB Leipzig	2023–24	Frauen-Bundesliga	15	0	2	0	17	0
RB Leipzig	2024–25	Frauen-Bundesliga	14	0	1	0	15	0
RB Leipzig	Total		29	0	3	0	32	0
Hamburger SV	2025–26	Frauen-Bundesliga	14	0	2	0	16	0
Hamburger SV	2026–27	Frauen-Bundesliga	2	0	1	0	3	0
Hamburger SV	Total		16	0	3	0	19	0
Career total			133	2	11	0	144	2
