= Lina Hausicke =

German footballer (born 1997)

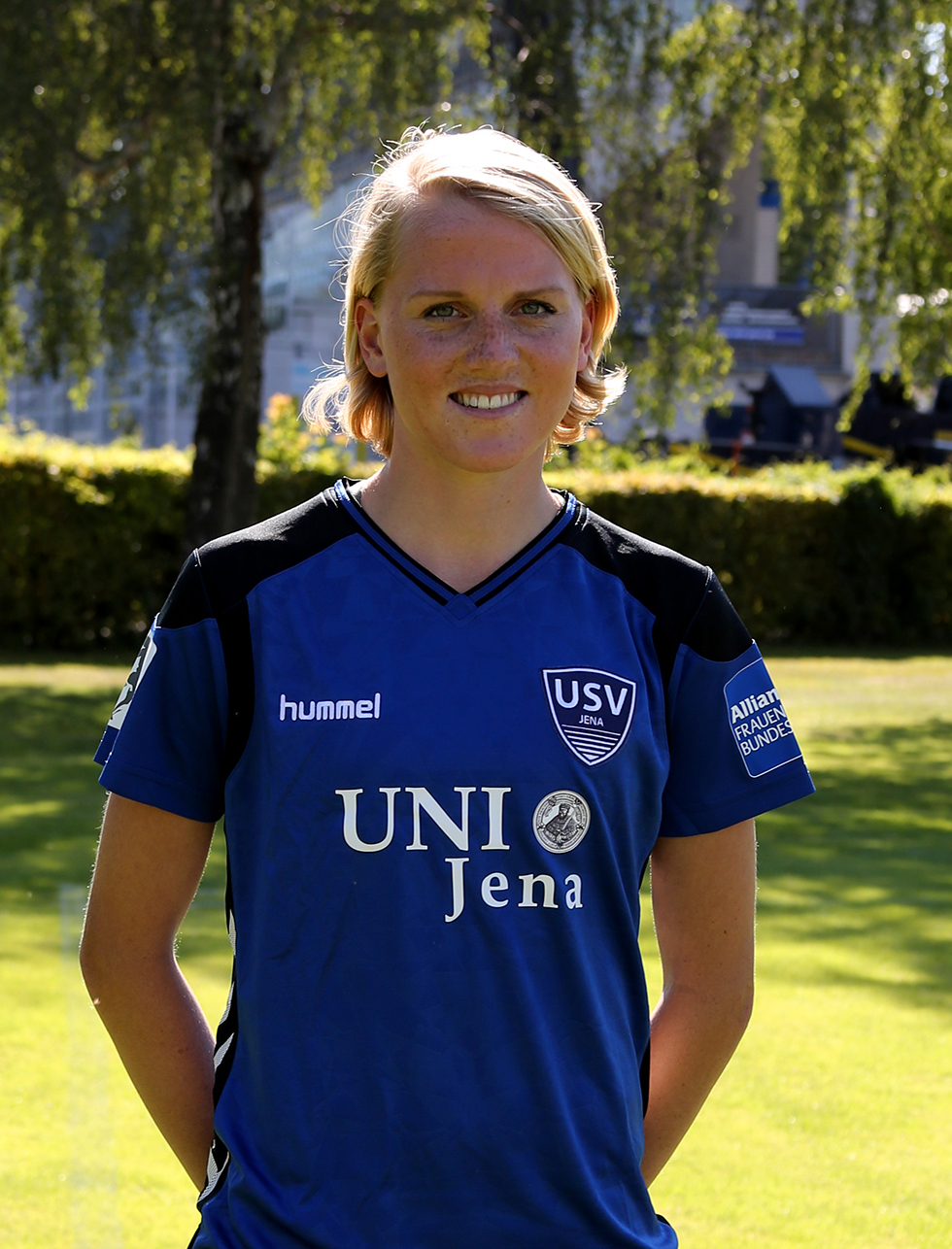
- Hausicke in 2016

Personal information
- Date of birth: 30 December 1997 (age 28)
- Place of birth: Halle, Germany
- Height: 1.76 m (5 ft 9 in)
- Position: Midfielder

Team information
- Current team: Union Berlin
- Number: 32

Youth career
- FF USV Jena

Senior career*
Years	Team	Apps	(Gls)
2013–2014	FF USV Jena II	10	(1)
2014–2017	FF USV Jena	53	(2)
2017–2026	Werder Bremen	151	(16)
2026–	Union Berlin	9	(3)

International career
2016	Germany U19	6	(0)
2016	Germany U20	1	(0)
- * Club domestic league appearances and goals as of 20 November 2026

Lina Hausicke (born 30 December 1997) is a German footballer who plays as a midfielder for Frauen-Bundesliga club Union Berlin.
