= Laura Sieger =

German footballer (born 2000)

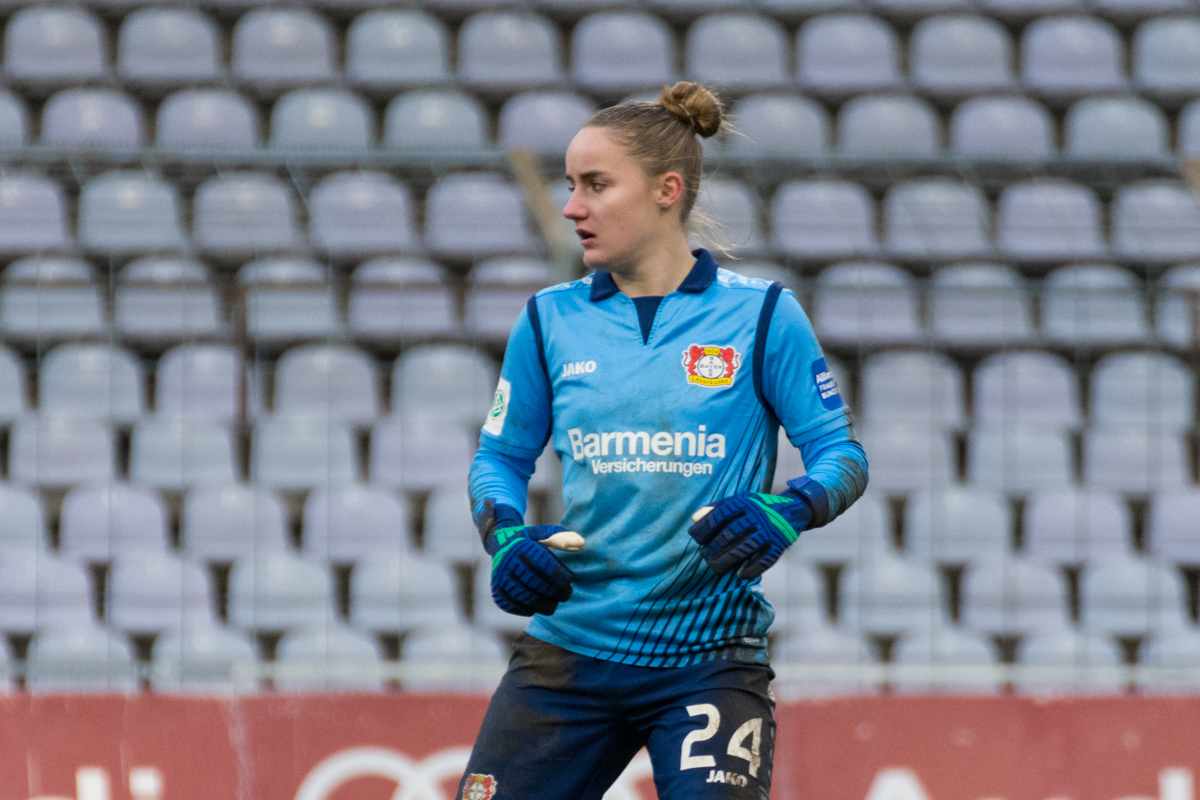
- Sieger in 2018

Personal information
- Date of birth: 18 February 2000 (age 26)
- Place of birth: Mechernich, Germany
- Height: 1.66 m (5 ft 5 in)
- Position: Goalkeeper

Team information
- Current team: Hamburger SV
- Number: 18

Senior career*
Years	Team	Apps	(Gls)
2016–2017	1. FC Köln	6	(0)
2017–2018	1. FC Köln II	9	(0)
2018–2020	Bayer Leverkusen	4	(0)
2020–2024	SV Meppen	69	(0)
2024–2025	SKN St. Pölten	4	(0)
2025–	Hamburger SV	2	(0)
- * Club domestic league appearances and goals as of 20:33, 14 February 2026 (UTC)

Laura Sieger (born 18 February 2000) is a German professional footballer who plays as a goalkeeper for Frauen-Bundesliga club Hamburger SV

== Club career ==
Sieger has played for Frauen-Bundesliga clubs 1. FC Köln, Bayer Leverkusen, SV Meppen and ÖFB Frauen Bundesliga club SKN St. Pölten.

In summer 2025, Sieger moved to Frauen-Bundesliga newcomer Hamburger SV.
