= Selma Ličina =

German association football player

Personal information
- Date of birth: May 8, 2001 (age 25)
- Place of birth: Bremen, Germany
- Position: Midfielder

Team information
- Current team: 1. FC Nürnberg
- Number: 17

Senior career*
Years	Team	Apps	(Gls)
2018–2019	Werder Bremen II	9	(1)
2022	Werder Bremen II	2	(1)
2023	Werder Bremen	2	(0)
2023–2025	SV Meppen	37	(10)
2025–	FC Nürnberg	20	(1)

International career^{‡}
2018	Germany U-17	2	(0)
2025–	Montenegro	9	(0)
- * Club domestic league appearances and goals as of 22 November 2026 ‡ National team caps and goals as of 23 April 2026

Selma Licina (born May 8, 2001 in Bremen) is a German football player for 1. FC Nürnberg and the Montenegro national team.

== Career ==
=== Club ===
Born and raised in Bremen, Ličina began playing soccer in Werder Bremen's youth academy. From 2015 to 2018, she played 48 league matches in the North/Northeast division of the U19 Bundesliga, scoring 20 goals.

While still a U19 player, she played her first five league games for the second team, which plays in the third-tier Regionalliga Nord. She made her debut on October 8, 2017. In the following season, she contributed one goal in four league games.

After graduating from Kippenberg-Gymnasium in the Schwachhausen district of Bremen, Ličina went to the United States to study psychology. She played in 52 West Coast Conference championship games for the University of Portland's Pilots from August 23, 2019 to November 18, 2022. She scored a goal in her penultimate championship game on November 12, 2022 in a 3–0 away win against the Sun Devils, the Arizona State University team, with the final goal in the 78th minute. Before starting her fourth year as a senior and before the start of the 2022 season, she was in Germany, playing two games for Werder Bremen's reserve team in May 2022, scoring one goal.

Returning to Germany in January 2023, Ličina took part in the preparations for the second half of the season and played her only two league games for Bundesliga club Werder Bremen. She made her debut on March 14, 2023.

For the 2023/24 season, she was signed by SV Meppen.

For the 2025/26 season, Ličina moved to Bundesliga promoted team 1. FC Nürnberg. In the away game against 1. FC Union Berlin, Ličina equalized in the 90th minute to make it 1–1.

=== National ===
Licina played as a player for the Bremen Football Association's selection team in the U14 (2015), U16 (2017), and U18 (2016-2018) age groups in a total of 18 tournament matches for the DFB-Länderpokal at the Wedau Sports School in Duisburg, in which she scored five goals.

She played two international matches for the U17 Germany national team. She made her debut on February 27, 2018 in Bergisch Gladbach in a 2–1 friendly win against the U17 Norway team, coming on as a substitute for Emilie Bernhardt in the 66th minute. She also played in the second match on March 1, 2018 in Cologne in another 2–1 win over the Norwegian U17 team, substituting for Shekiera Martinez in the 54th minute.

Ličina made her debut for the Montenegro national team on February 25, 2025 in Podgorica in a 3–1 win over Lithuania in the second group stage match of the UEFA Nations League.

== Honors ==
- Champion of the Regional League North 2022
