= 1. FC Lokomotive Leipzig (women) =

German football club

- Full name: 1. Fußballclub Lokomotive Leipzig e.V.
- Nickname: Loksche
- Founded: 2003
- Dissolved: 2013
- Ground: Bruno-Plache-Stadion; Red Bull Arena
- Capacity: 15,600; 44,345
- League: Defunct
Home colours	Away colours

1. FC Lokomotive Leipzig's women team represented 1. FC Lokomotive Leipzig in the Frauen Bundesliga.

After spending five seasons in the 2. Frauen Bundesliga Lokomotive was the North group's runner-up in the 2010–11 season, second to Hamburger SV II. Since Hamburger II wasn't eligible for promotion as a reserve team, Lokomotive was instead promoted, reaching the Frauen Bundesliga for the first time in its history.

In 2013 Lok's women's football department collectively left to form a new club, FFV Leipzig.

== Former players ==
- (Germany) Babett Peter
