= 2010–11 2. Frauen-Bundesliga =

German women's football league season

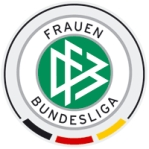

The 2010–11 season of the Women's 2nd Fußball-Bundesliga was the seventh season of Germany's second-tier women's football league. It began on 15 August 2010 and ended regular season ended on 1 May 2011. For the first time the 2nd Bundesliga was won by a reserve team, when Hamburg II won the northern division. With Hamburg playing in the Bundesliga the reserve was not eligible for promotion. Lokomotive Leipzig as runners-up were thus promoted to the Bundesliga. Eventually Hamburg II announced that they would withdraw from the league in the following season due to financial concerns. Cloppenburg and Löchgau, the tenth-place finishers from both divisions, were thus spared a relegation playoff against each other and instead stay in the league. The southern division was won by Freiburg.

== League tables ==
Note: Reserve teams from Fußball-Bundesliga sides were not eligible for promotion.

=== North ===
Pos	Team	Pld	W	D	L	GF	GA	GD	Pts	Promotion or relegation
1	Hamburg II	22	17	5	0	57	18	+39	56	Withdrew (Note: Hamburg II withdrew from the league due to financial concerns)
2	1. FC Lokomotive Leipzig	22	17	2	3	54	20	+34	53	Promoted to the Fußball-Bundesliga (women)
3	Turbine Potsdam II	22	13	5	4	59	25	+34	44	
4	1. FC Lübars (Note: Promoted from the Regionalliga last season)	22	12	3	7	43	30	+13	39	
5	Werder Bremen	22	11	3	8	35	29	+6	36	
6	SV Victoria Gersten	22	9	4	9	30	31	−1	31	
7	FFC Oldesloe 2000	22	7	6	9	29	33	−4	27	
8	FSV Gütersloh 2009	22	7	5	10	30	33	−3	26	
9	Magdeburger FFC	22	4	7	11	23	32	−9	19	
10	BV Cloppenburg	22	3	6	13	15	45	−30	15	
11	Tennis Borussia Berlin (Note: Relegated from the Bundesliga last season)	22	3	3	16	14	58	−44	12	Relegated to the new Fußball-Regionalliga (women)
12	Holstein Kiel	22	2	5	15	12	47	−35	11	Relegated to the new Fußball-Regionalliga (women)

Source: Kicker.de (in German)
Rules for classification: 1) points; 2) goal difference; 3) number of goals scored.

=== South ===
Pos	Team	Pld	W	D	L	GF	GA	GD	Pts	Promotion or relegation
1	SC Freiburg (Note: Relegated from the Bundesliga last season)	22	20	0	2	80	8	+72	60	Promoted to the Fußball-Bundesliga (women)
2	1. FC Köln	22	16	3	3	74	19	+55	51	
3	1899 Hoffenheim (Note: Promoted from the Regionalliga last season)	22	13	4	5	46	22	+24	43	
4	TSV Crailsheim	22	9	6	7	25	28	−3	33	
5	VfL Sindelfingen	22	9	4	9	32	37	−5	31	
6	FCR 2001 Duisburg II	22	8	4	10	29	35	−6	28	
7	FFC Niederkirchen	22	8	4	10	37	51	−14	28	
8	Bayern Munich II	22	8	2	12	40	40	0	26	
9	FFC Frankfurt II	22	7	3	12	29	45	−16	24	
10	FV Löchgau	22	6	4	12	18	37	−19	22	
11	SC Sand	22	7	0	15	25	46	−21	21	Relegated to the new Fußball-Regionalliga (women)
12	FFC Recklinghausen	22	2	4	16	18	85	−67	10	Relegated to the new Fußball-Regionalliga (women)

Source: Kicker.de (in German)
Rules for classification: 1) points; 2) goal difference; 3) number of goals scored.

== Relegation play-off ==
BV Cloppenburg and FV Löchgau were supposed to play each other on a home and away basis as 10th-place finishers to determine a fifth relegation. After Hamburg II announced on 4 May 2011 not to participate in next season's 2nd Bundesliga due to monetary reasons, those matches were canceled with both teams saved from relegation.
