= Kristin Krammer =

Austrian footballer

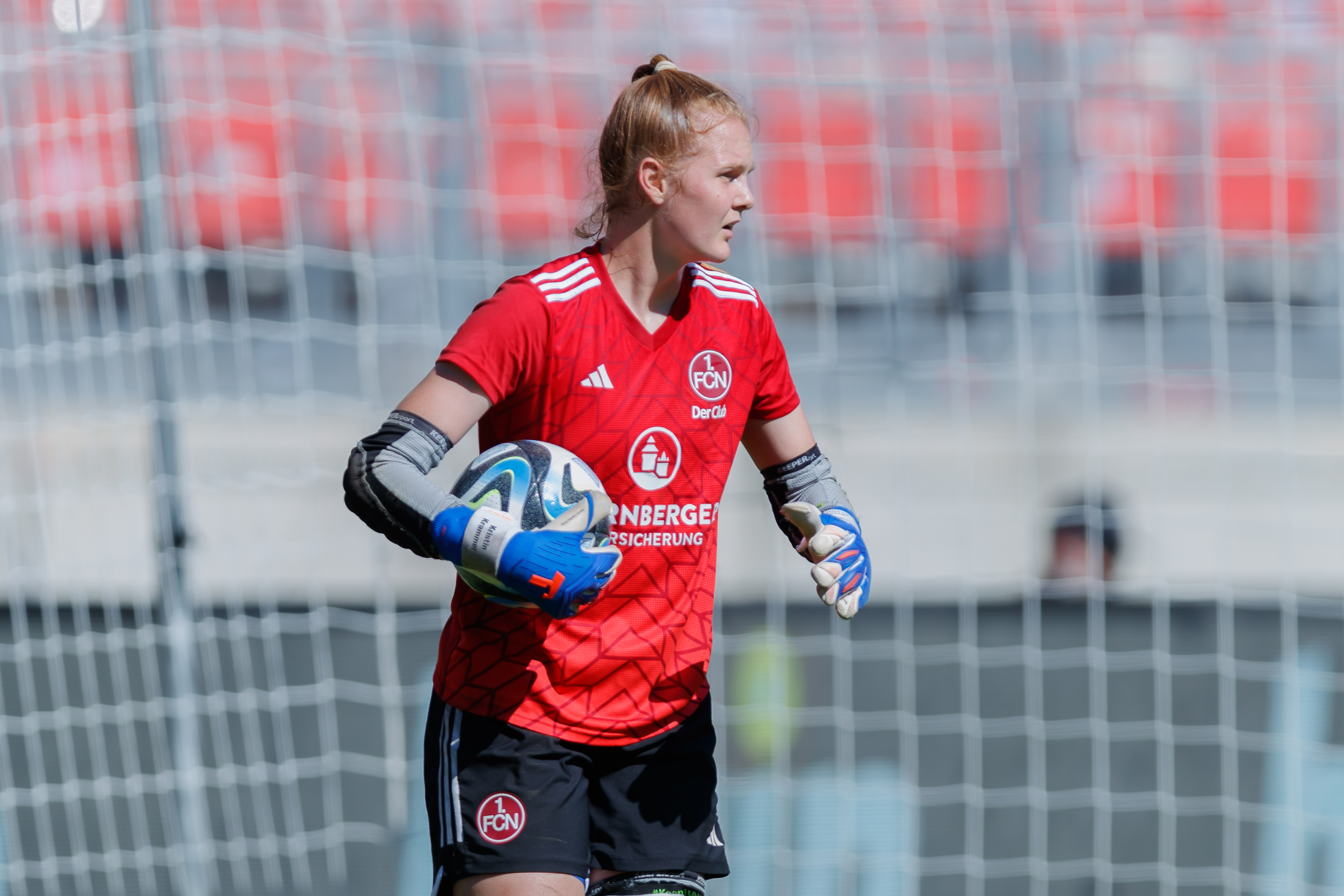
- Krammer in 2023 at 1. FC Nürnberg

Personal information
- Date of birth: 24 May 2002 (age 24)
- Position: Goalkeeper

Team information
- Current team: Malmö FF (on loan from Sturm Graz)

Youth career
- 2011–2016: Obermillstatt
- 2015–2016: Kärnten
- 2016: BL NW Meisterschaft

Senior career*
Years	Team	Apps	(Gls)
2016–2017	Carinthians Spittal B	14	(6)
2016–2018	Carinthians Spittal	34	(0)
2019	St. Pölten II	4	(0)
2019	St. Pölten	3	(0)
2020–2022	Neulengbach Juniors	9	(1)
2020–2022	Neulengbach	18	(0)
2022–2023	1. FC Köln	0	(0)
2022–2023	1. FC Köln II	20	(0)
2023–2026	1. FC Nürnberg	22	(0)
2026-	Sturm Graz	0	(0)
2026-	→ Malmö FF (loan)	0	(0)

International career^{‡}
2018	Austria U16	1	(0)
2017–2019	Austria U17	15	(0)
2019–2020	Austria U19	7	(0)
2021–	Austria	1	(0)
- * Club domestic league appearances and goals as of 29 May 2021. ‡ National team caps and goals as of 23 February 2021.

Kristin Krammer (born 24 May 2002) is an Austrian footballer who plays as a goalkeeper for Damallsvenskan club Malmö FF, on loan from Sturm Graz and the Austria women's national team.

== Club career ==
Krammer has played for Carinthians Spittal, SKN St. Pölten and Neulengbach in Austria.

== International career ==
Krammer made her senior debut for Austria on 23 February 2021 in a 1–0 friendly win over Slovakia.
