= 1. FC Union Berlin (women) =

1. FC Union Berlin Frauen
- Full name: 1. Fußballclub Union Berlin e. V.
- Founded: 22 September 1969; 57 years ago
- Ground: Stadion An der Alten Försterei
- Capacity: 22.012
- President: Dirk Zingler
- Manager: Marie-Louise Eta
- League: Frauen-Bundesliga
- 2025–26: Bundesliga, 9th of 14
Home colours	Away colours	Third colours

1. FC Union Berlin is a women's association football club from Berlin, Germany. It is part of the 1. FC Union Berlin club.

== History ==
1. FC Union Berlin was among the first clubs in former East Germany to establish a women's team. On 22 September 1969, the women's team received support from the club's first men's team and was coached by Bernd Müller and Bernd Vogel. After the dissolution of KWO Berlin in 1990, all their players joined 1. FC Union and competed in the final season of the GDR football championship. The team later played in the Oberliga Nordost but was relegated to the Verbandsliga Berlin in 1993.

They were promoted to the Regionalliga Nordost for the 2001–02 season and then to the 2. Frauen-Bundesliga for the 2007–08 season. After two seasons, they were relegated back to the Regionalliga Nordost for five seasons. Between 2014–15 and 2016–17, they experienced several promotions and relegations. Eventually, they settled in the Regionalliga Nordost until they were converted into a professional club for the 2023–24 season. Subsequently, they finished at the top of their region, earning promotion back to the 2. Frauen-Bundesliga for the 2024–25 season, following a 10–0 victory on aggregate over SV Henstedt-Ulzburg in the promotion play-off final. During the 2023–24 Regionalliga Nordost season, the team outscored opponents 145–5. On 27 April 2025, the club secured their first-ever promotion to the Bundesliga following a 6–1 victory over Borussia Mönchengladbach.

== Squad ==
As of 25 September 2026

Note: Flags indicate national team as defined under FIFA eligibility rules; some limited exceptions apply. Players may hold more than one non-FIFA nationality.

No.	Pos.	Nation	Player
1	GK	GER	Cara Bösl
2	DF	GER	Tomke Schneider
4	DF	GER	Anna Aehling
5	DF	ESP	Judit Pujols
6	MF	GER	Lisanne Gräwe
7	MF	GER	Lisa Heiseler (captain)
8	MF	SLO	Korina Janež
9	FW	GER	Sophie Weidauer
10	FW	AUT	Eileen Campbell
11	FW	GER	Dina Orschmann
12	GK	GER	Nelly Smolarczyk
14	FW	BEL	Hannah Eurlings
17	DF	GER	Judith Steinert
18	MF	GER	Leona Seifert
19	DF	GER	Samantha Steuerwald

No.	Pos.	Nation	Player
21	DF	GER	Anna Weiß
22	DF	GER	Mariann Noack
23	FW	GER	Nele Bauereisen
25	DF	FIN	Ida Heikkinen
26	DF	BEL	Amber Tysiak
27	DF	SUI	Leela Egli
28	GK	SUI	Nadine Böhi
30	DF	GER	Jella Veit
31	MF	POL	Tanja Pawollek
32	MF	GER	Lina Hausicke
41	MF	SUI	Lia Kamber
42	MF	AUT	Naika Reissner
77	FW	BEL	Jill Janssens
—	GK	COL	Catalina Perez

=== Out on loan ===
Note: Flags indicate national team as defined under FIFA eligibility rules; some limited exceptions apply. Players may hold more than one non-FIFA nationality.

No.	Pos.	Nation	Player
15	FW	DEN	Alma Aagaard (on loan at SKN St. Pölten until 30 June 2027)
20	MF	GER	Leonie Köster (on loan at BSC YB Frauen until 30 June 2027)
3	DF	NOR	Silje Skaara Helgesen (on loan at Aalesunds FK until 30 June 2027)

== Former players ==
For notable current and former players, see Category:1. FC Union Berlin (women) players.

== Current staff ==
As of 1 July 2026

Coaching staff
(Germany) Marie-Louise Eta	Head coach
(Germany) Sabrina Eckhoff (Germany) Simon Falke	Assistant coach
(Germany) Alisa Vetterlein	Goalkeeping coach
(Germany) Marcus Liebig	Athletic trainer
Managerial staff
(Germany) Jennifer Zietz	Head of women's and girls' department
(Germany) Marvin Bellin	Scout & Squad Planner
(Germany) Viktoria Tänzer	Team leader
(Germany) Jan Walle	Equipment manager
Medical department
(Germany) Nico Haase Marinowski (Germany) Giuliana Di Bartolo	Physiotherapist
(Germany) Elisa Lierhaus	Sports psychologist
(Germany) Sofia Wünsch	Caregiver

== Honours ==
2. Frauen-Bundesliga
Champions: 2024–25
Frauen-Regionalliga Nordost
Champions: 2006–07, 2015–16, 2017–18, 2018–19, 2023–24
Berlin Association League
Champions: 1993–94, 1994–95, 2000–01
Berlin Cup
Champions: 2005–06, 2006–07, 2013–14, 2016, 2018–19, 2023–24
