= Cara Bösl =

German footballer (born 1997)

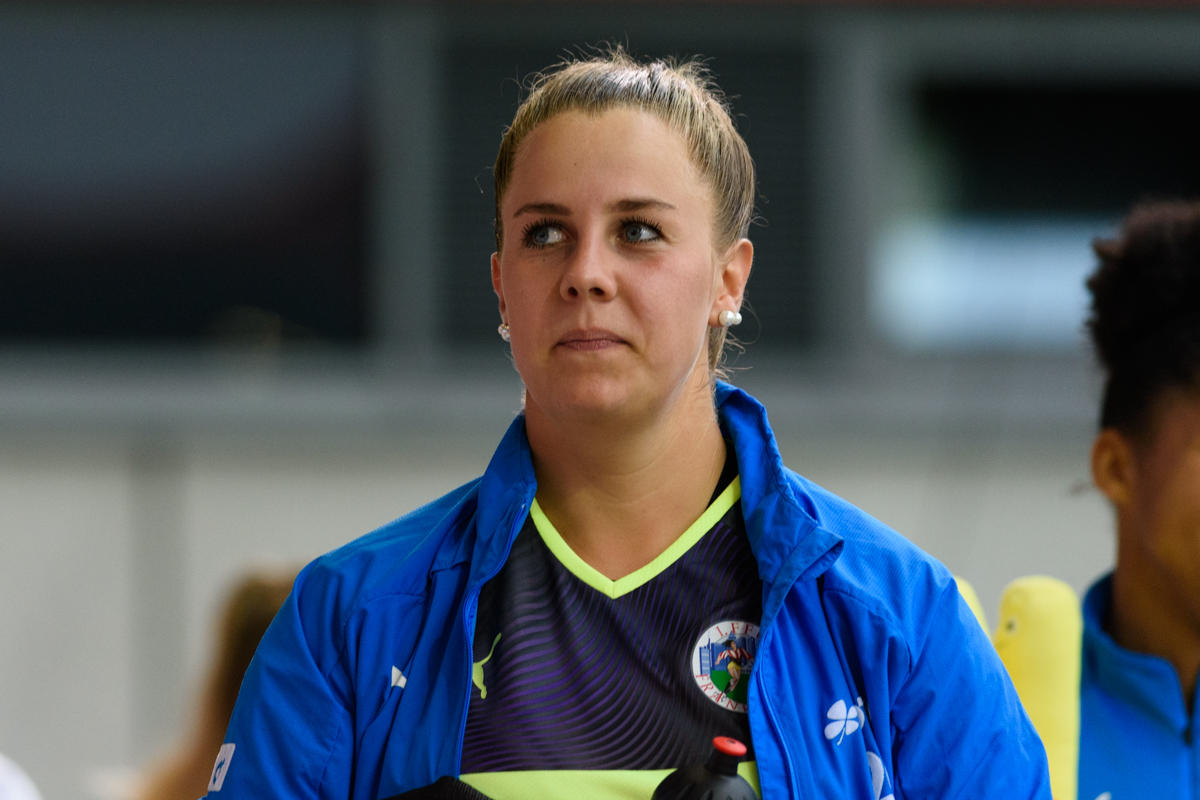
- Bösl in 2019

Personal information
- Date of birth: 11 February 1997 (age 29)
- Place of birth: Rüsselsheim am Main, Germany
- Height: 1.73 m (5 ft 8 in)
- Position: Goalkeeper

Team information
- Current team: 1. FC Union Berlin
- Number: 1

Youth career
- SV Alemannia Königstädten
- –2012: SC Opel Rüsselsheim
- 2012–2014: 1. FFC Frankfurt

Senior career*
Years	Team	Apps	(Gls)
2014–2022	Eintracht Frankfurt II	45	(0)
2017–2024	Eintracht Frankfurt	13	(0)
2024–	1. FC Union Berlin	47	(0)
- * Club domestic league appearances and goals as of 21 August 2026

Cara Bösl (born 11 February 1997) is a German footballer who plays as a goalkeeper for 2. Frauen-Bundesliga club 1. FC Union Berlin.

== Career ==
Bösl began her career as a field player, but switched to goalkeeper early on. As a junior she played for the Alemannia Königstädten and Opel Rüsselsheim clubs. With the Hesse selection she won the U15 National Cup in 2012. Later that year she moved to 1. FFC Frankfurt and played there for the B juniors. From 2014 she played for the FFC second team in the 2nd Bundesliga. On 2 April 2017, she made her debut in the Bundesliga in the away game in Jena, which Frankfurt won 1–0. She was in goal for the rest of the season. After Bryane Heaberlin was signed for the 2017/18 season, she was behind this goalkeeper.

In July 2020, 1. FFC Frankfurt was integrated into the Eintracht Frankfurt club, thus forming the club's women's football department. In July 2024, she joined newly promoted 1. FC Union Berlin in the 2. Frauen-Bundesliga.

== Achievements ==
- U15 National Cup winner 2012

== Personal life ==
Bösl has been studying sports and educational sciences since October 2016.
