= Nastassja Lein =

German footballer (born 2001)

Personal information
- Date of birth: 13 February 2001 (age 25)
- Place of birth: Nuremberg, Germany
- Height: 1.61 m (5 ft 3 in)
- Positions: Forward; midfielder

Team information
- Current team: 1. FC Nürnberg
- Number: 24

Youth career
- 2008–2016: DJK Don Bosco Bamberg
- 2016–2017: 1. FC Nürnberg

Senior career*
Years	Team	Apps	(Gls)
2017–	1. FC Nürnberg	195	(83)

International career^{‡}
2026–	Germany U23	1	(0)
- * Club domestic league appearances and goals as of 22 November 2026 ‡ National team caps and goals as of 6 March 2026

Nastassja Lein (born 13 February 2001) is a German footballer who plays as a forward and midfielder for 1. FC Nürnberg.
