= 2017–18 Frauen-Bundesliga =

Frauen-Bundesliga
- Season: 2017–18
- Champions: VfL Wolfsburg
- Relegated: 1. FC Köln; FF USV Jena
- Champions League: VfL Wolfsburg; Bayern Munich
- Matches: 132
- Goals: 407 (3.08 per match)
- Top goalscorer: Pernille Harder (17 goals)
- Biggest home win: Bremen 7–0 Köln
- Biggest away win: Köln 0–8 Potsdam; Köln 0–8 Munich
- Highest scoring: Köln 0–8 Potsdam; Köln 0–8 Munich
- Attendance: 111,717 (846 per match)

The 2017–18 season of the Frauen-Bundesliga was the 28th season of Germany's premier women's football league. It ran from 2 September 2017 to 3 June 2018.

The fixtures were published on 10 July 2017.

VfL Wolfsburg won their second straight and fourth overall title.

== Teams ==
Locations of teams in the 2017–18 Frauen-Bundesliga

=== Team changes ===
Promoted from 2016–17 2. Bundesliga	Relegated from 2016–17 Bundesliga
Werder Bremen; 1. FC Köln	Bayer Leverkusen; Borussia Mönchengladbach

=== Stadiums ===
Team	Home city	Home ground	Capacity
Werder Bremen	Bremen	Weserstadion Platz 11	1,000
MSV Duisburg	Duisburg	PCC-Stadion	3,000
SGS Essen	Essen	Stadion Essen	20,000
1. FFC Frankfurt	Frankfurt	Stadion am Brentanobad	5,500
SC Freiburg	Freiburg	Möslestadion	18,000
1899 Hoffenheim	Hoffenheim	Dietmar-Hopp-Stadion	6,350
USV Jena	Jena	Ernst-Abbe-Sportfeld	10,800
1. FC Köln	Cologne	Südstadion	11,748
Bayern Munich	Munich	Grünwalder Stadion	12,500
Turbine Potsdam	Potsdam	Karl-Liebknecht-Stadion	10,786
SC Sand	Willstätt	Kühnmatt Stadion	2,000
VfL Wolfsburg	Wolfsburg	AOK Stadium	5,200

== League table ==
Pos	Team	Pld	W	D	L	GF	GA	GD	Pts	Qualification or relegation
1	VfL Wolfsburg (C)	22	18	2	2	56	8	+48	56	Qualification for Champions League
2	Bayern Munich	22	17	2	3	62	15	+47	53	Qualification for Champions League
3	SC Freiburg	22	15	3	4	50	15	+35	48	
4	Turbine Potsdam	22	13	6	3	50	21	+29	45	
5	SGS Essen	22	12	3	7	43	30	+13	39	
6	1. FFC Frankfurt	22	10	1	11	29	25	+4	31	
7	SC Sand	22	9	3	10	32	34	−2	30	
8	1899 Hoffenheim	22	8	1	13	22	32	−10	25	
9	MSV Duisburg	22	6	0	16	16	33	−17	18	
10	Werder Bremen	22	3	5	14	26	59	−33	14	
11	1. FC Köln (R)	22	3	2	17	8	78	−70	11	Relegation to 2. Bundesliga
12	USV Jena (R)	22	2	4	16	12	56	−44	10	Relegation to 2. Bundesliga

Source: Kicker
Rules for classification: 1) Points; 2) Goal difference; 3) Goals scored
(C) Champions; (R) Relegated

== Results ==
Home \ Away	BRE	DUI	ESS	FRA	FRE	HOF	JEN	KÖL	MUN	POT	SAN	WOL
Werder Bremen	—	2–1	0–0	0–1	0–3	0–4	1–1	7–0	2–7	1–5	0–3	0–5
MSV Duisburg	1–0	—	1–2	2–0	2–1	2–0	1–0	0–1	1–3	0–1	0–2	0–1
SGS Essen	6–2	3–1	—	3–1	0–3	1–2	6–0	4–1	0–3	0–0	3–0	0–4
1. FFC Frankfurt	4–0	2–1	0–1	—	1–2	2–0	4–2	2–0	0–1	0–1	1–2	0–2
SC Freiburg	4–1	1–0	1–1	0–3	—	2–1	5–0	6–0	2–0	1–1	3–0	1–0
1899 Hoffenheim	2–0	1–0	2–1	0–1	0–1	—	2–3	0–1	0–4	0–4	1–0	0–1
USV Jena	2–2	3–0	0–1	0–1	0–4	0–3	—	0–0	0–5	0–5	0–1	0–4
1. FC Köln	0–2	0–2	2–5	0–3	0–7	0–3	1–0	—	0–8	0–8	0–6	0–6
Bayern Munich	4–1	3–1	2–1	3–0	0–1	1–0	0–0	2–0	—	5–0	2–0	2–1
Turbine Potsdam	1–1	2–0	1–2	1–1	1–0	2–0	4–1	4–2	2–2	—	3–1	0–1
SC Sand	2–2	4–0	1–3	3–2	2–2	0–0	1–0	3–0	0–4	1–2	—	0–4
VfL Wolfsburg	3–2	1–0	2–0	1–0	2–0	6–0	5–0	0–0	3–1	2–2	2–0	—

Source: Kicker
Legend: Blue = home team win; Yellow = draw; Red = away team win.

== Topscorers ==
Rank	Player	Team	Goals
1	(Denmark) Pernille Harder	VfL Wolfsburg	17
2	(Germany) Lina Magull	SC Freiburg	12
3	(Germany) Linda Dallmann	SGS Essen	11
4	(Austria) Nina Burger	SC Sand	10
5	(Hungary) Zsanett Jakabfi	VfL Wolfsburg	9
5	(Sweden) Fridolina Rolfö	Bayern Munich	9
7	(Germany) Sara Däbritz	Bayern Munich	8
7	(Germany) Svenja Huth	Turbine Potsdam	8
9	Six players		7
