= Bernd Müller (footballer, born 1949) =

German footballer

Personal information
- Full name: Bernd Müller
- Date of birth: 2 April 1949 (age 77)
- Place of birth: Berlin, Germany
- Position: Defender

Youth career
- –1966: BSG Motor Köpenick
- 1966–1969: 1. FC Union Berlin

Senior career*
Years	Team	Apps	(Gls)
1969–1973	1. FC Union Berlin	55	(1)
1973–1975	BSG Motor Hennigsdorf		
1975–1976	BSG EAB Lichtenberg 47		
1976–1977	BSG Rotation Berlin		
- * Club domestic league appearances and goals

Bernd Müller (born 2 April 1949 in Berlin) is a former East German footballer.

Müller made 55 appearances for 1. FC Union Berlin in the DDR-Oberliga during his playing career.
