= 1. FC Nürnberg (women) =

Women's football club in Germany

- Founded: 24 August 1988; 38 years ago
- Ground: Max-Morlock-Stadion
- Capacity: 50,000
- Board member: Dieter Hecking (sport); Niels Rossow (commercial)
- Head coach: Omar Adlani
- League: Frauen-Bundesliga
- 2025–26: Bundesliga, 11th of 14
Home colours	Away colours	Third colours

1. FC Nürnberg is a women's football club from Nuremberg, Germany. It currently plays in the Bundesliga.

== History ==
The women's and girls' department of 1. FC Nürnberg was founded on 24 August 1988. As part of the restructuring of the club and the spin-off of the departments into independent clubs, seven people founded an independent club in the business premises of 1. FC Nürnberg in the spring of 1995, as 1. Fußball-Club Nürnberg Frauen- und Mädchen Fußball e. V.. In 1999, the club managed to achieve promotion to the Bundesliga for the 1999–2000 season, which was followed by relegation to the Regionalliga South. In 2003–04, they were relegated to Bayernliga, then to Bayernliga North, before they secured two consecutive promotions to the Regionalliga for the 2009–10 season. After two seasons, they were relegated back to Bayernliga, before spending another eight years in Regionalliga.

In 2020–21, Nürnberg finished top of their group in Regionalliga South, to achieve promotion to the 2. Bundesliga. On 19 November 2022, at the annual general meeting of 1. FC Nürnberg, the merger of the women's and girls' football club and the men's football club was decided without any dissenting votes. In 2022–23, the club finished second in the second division, which secured their promotion to the Bundesliga after 24 years. In the 2023–24 season, the club moved from playing at Valznerweiher to Max-Morlock-Stadion. After being relegated following an 11th-place finish in the top division, Nürnberg clinched a return to the Bundesliga in late April 2025 by securing a spot among the top three teams. In the 2025-26 season the team secured a second consecutive season in the Frauen-Bundesliga for the first time by finishing 11th out of 14 teams.

== Squad ==
As of 17 September 2026

Note: Flags indicate national team as defined under FIFA eligibility rules; some limited exceptions apply. Players may hold more than one non-FIFA nationality.

No.	Pos.	Nation	Player
1	GK	SUI	Lourdes Romero
2	DF	AUS	Leia Varley
3	MF	FRA	Fany Proniez
4	DF	RUS	Alexsandra Lobanova
5	DF	GER	Clara Fröhlich
6	MF	FRA	Charline Coutel
7	MF	MNE	Selma Ličina
9	MF	LUX	Laura Miller
10	MF	GER	Jonna Brengel
11	MF	SUI	Lara Meroni
12	DF	GER	Amélie Thöle
14	DF	GER	Marlene Lindner
15	FW	HUN	Emőke Pápai
16	DF	POL	Zuzanna Grzywińska

No.	Pos.	Nation	Player
17	DF	GER	Marie Bleil
18	MF	GER	Franziska Mai
19	MF	GER	Sanja Homann
20	FW	GER	Jacqueline Baumgärtel
21	DF	GER	Keira Bednorz
22	DF	GER	Julia Pollak
23	FW	HUN	Bori Turi
24	FW	GER	Nastassja Lein (captain)
28	MF	FRA	Maëlle Seguin
29	FW	GER	Hanna Deuber
31	GK	GER	Sina Tölzel
33	GK	GER	Rebecca Adamczyk
77	MF	POR	Malafda Barboz
99	FW	FRA	Louna Lapassouse
—	GK	AUT	Mia Richter

== Former players ==
- (Ukraine) Olena Mazurenko
- (Czech Republic) Pavla Benyrova
- (Montenegro) Medina Desic
- (England) Hannah Fryer
- (Germany) Jessica May
- (Germany) Lea Paulick
- (United States) Camille Pereira
- (United States) Marissa Schultz
- (Switzerland) Saskia Bürki
- (Switzerland) Amira Arfaoui
- (Iceland) Selma Sól Magnúsdóttir
- (Argentina) Abigail Chaves
- (Austria) Kristin Krammer
