= 2025–26 Frauen-Bundesliga =

Frauen-Bundesliga
- Season: 2025–26
- Dates: 5 September 2025 – 17 May 2026
- Champions: Bayern Munich
- Relegated: Carl Zeiss Jena; SGS Essen
- Champions League: Bayern Munich; VfL Wolfsburg; Eintracht Frankfurt
- Matches: 182
- Goals: 627 (3.45 per match)
- Top goalscorer: Larissa Mühlhaus (17 goals)
- Biggest home win: Munich 6–0 Hamburg
- Biggest away win: Essen 0–8 Wolfsburg
- Highest scoring: Freiburg 6–2 Hamburg; Essen 0–8 Wolfsburg; Nürnberg 5–3 Frankfurt
- Longest winning run: 21 games Munich
- Longest unbeaten run: 26 games Munich
- Longest winless run: 12 games Jena
- Longest losing run: 7 games Essen
- Attendance: 653,229 (3,589 per match)

The 2025–26 season of the Frauen-Bundesliga was the 36th season of Germany's premier women's football league. It ran from 5 September 2025 to 17 May 2026.

Bayern Munich won their fourth consecutive Frauen-Bundesliga title after a 3–2 win over Union Berlin away on 22 April 2026.

This season was the first played with 14 teams. The fixtures were announced on 11 July 2025.

== Teams ==
Locations of teams in the 2025–26 Frauen-Bundesliga

=== Team changes ===
Promoted from 2024–25 2. Bundesliga	Relegated from 2024–25 Bundesliga
Union Berlin; 1. FC Nürnberg; Hamburger SV	Turbine Potsdam

=== Stadiums ===
Team	Home city	Home ground	Capacity
Werder Bremen	Bremen	Weserstadion Platz 11	5,500
Union Berlin	Berlin	Stadion An der Alten Försterei	22,012
SGS Essen	Essen	Stadion Essen	20,650
Eintracht Frankfurt	Frankfurt	Stadion am Brentanobad	5,650
SC Freiburg	Freiburg	Dreisamstadion	24,000
Hamburger SV	Hamburg	Volksparkstadion	57,000
TSG Hoffenheim	Hoffenheim	Dietmar-Hopp-Stadion	6,350
Carl Zeiss Jena	Jena	Ernst-Abbe-Sportfeld	10,445
1. FC Köln	Cologne	Franz-Kremer-Stadion	5,457
RB Leipzig	Leipzig	Sportanlage Gontardweg	1,300
Bayer Leverkusen	Leverkusen	Ulrich-Haberland-Stadion	3,200
Bayern Munich	Munich	FC Bayern Campus	2,500
1. FC Nürnberg	Nuremberg	Max-Morlock-Stadion	50,000
VfL Wolfsburg	Wolfsburg	AOK Stadion	5,200

== League table ==
Pos	Team	Pld	W	D	L	GF	GA	GD	Pts	Qualification or relegation
1	Bayern Munich (C)	26	24	2	0	90	9	+81	74	Qualification for Champions League league phase
2	VfL Wolfsburg	26	18	4	4	72	38	+34	58	Qualification for Champions League third qualifying round
3	Eintracht Frankfurt	26	16	3	7	65	43	+22	51	Qualification for Champions League second qualifying round
4	TSG Hoffenheim	26	14	4	8	48	30	+18	46	
5	Bayer Leverkusen	26	15	1	10	46	36	+10	46	
6	Werder Bremen	26	12	7	7	42	36	+6	43	
7	1. FC Köln	26	11	4	11	36	37	−1	37	
8	SC Freiburg	26	10	4	12	44	46	−2	34	
9	Union Berlin	26	8	6	12	42	51	−9	30	
10	RB Leipzig	26	7	7	12	39	48	−9	28	
11	1. FC Nürnberg	26	6	4	16	33	61	−28	22	
12	Hamburger SV	26	4	6	16	26	57	−31	18	
13	SGS Essen (R)	26	3	7	16	22	63	−41	16	Relegation to 2. Bundesliga
14	Carl Zeiss Jena (R)	26	2	5	19	22	72	−50	11	Relegation to 2. Bundesliga

Source: DFB
Rules for classification: 1) Points; 2) Goal difference; 3) Goals scored; 4) Head-to-head results; 5) Head-to-head away goals scored; 6) Away goals scored; 7) Play-off.
(C) Champions; (R) Relegated

== Results ==
Home \ Away	BER	BRE	ESS	FRA	FRE	HAM	HOF	JEN	KÖL	LEI	LEV	MUN	NÜR	WOL
Union Berlin	—	4–1	2–0	2–2	0–3	1–1	0–2	1–2	2–1	5–0	1–2	2–3	1–1	1–4
Werder Bremen	3–0	—	2–1	4–2	1–1	2–0	2–1	7–0	1–1	2–1	1–0	0–2	1–1	0–0
SGS Essen	2–4	2–3	—	1–4	1–1	0–0	0–1	4–3	1–2	2–2	0–4	0–5	2–0	0–8
Eintracht Frankfurt	4–2	2–0	5–0	—	3–0	4–1	2–0	3–1	1–1	4–3	1–0	0–5	4–1	3–1
SC Freiburg	1–1	3–0	0–0	3–2	—	6–2	1–2	3–0	1–0	2–4	2–1	1–4	2–1	2–4
Hamburger SV	0–1	1–1	2–1	0–4	0–2	—	1–4	1–1	1–4	1–3	1–3	0–1	1–2	3–3
TSG Hoffenheim	3–0	0–0	4–0	3–0	2–1	0–4	—	5–1	6–2	0–0	0–2	1–5	1–1	0–1
Carl Zeiss Jena	1–2	0–1	1–1	1–4	1–5	1–1	1–4	—	0–3	1–1	2–4	0–6	2–3	0–2
1. FC Köln	2–1	3–0	0–0	1–2	1–0	2–1	1–0	0–1	—	0–2	2–2	0–3	3–0	1–2
RB Leipzig	2–2	1–1	2–1	2–2	2–0	0–1	2–3	2–0	0–1	—	1–3	0–3	3–1	1–3
Bayer Leverkusen	3–2	1–3	0–1	2–1	4–1	2–1	0–1	1–0	2–1	3–2	—	0–3	4–0	1–5
Bayern Munich	4–0	4–0	4–1	2–0	4–0	6–0	1–1	0–0	5–1	3–0	2–0	—	2–0	4–1
1. FC Nürnberg	1–2	1–4	3–0	5–3	3–2	0–1	0–3	5–1	1–2	1–1	0–1	0–6	—	1–6
VfL Wolfsburg	3–3	4–2	1–1	2–3	3–1	3–1	2–1	3–1	2–1	3–2	2–1	1–3	3–1	—

Source: DFB
Legend: Blue = home team win; Yellow = draw; Red = away team win.

== Statistics ==
=== Top scorers ===
Rank	Player	Club	Goals
1	(Germany) Larissa Mühlhaus	Werder Bremen	17
2	(Germany) Selina Cerci	TSG Hoffenheim	16
2	(Denmark) Pernille Harder	Bayern Munich	16
4	(Germany) Vanessa Fudalla	Bayer Leverkusen	14
4	(Germany) Alexandra Popp	VfL Wolfsburg	14
6	(Germany) Nicole Anyomi	Eintracht Frankfurt	13
7	(Germany) Laura Freigang	Eintracht Frankfurt	12
7	(Iceland) Sandra Jessen	1. FC Köln	12
9	(Germany) Nastassja Lein	1. FC Nürnberg	11
10	(Sweden) Rebecka Blomqvist	Eintracht Frankfurt	10

=== Hat-tricks ===
Player	Club	Against	Result	Date
(Iceland) Sandra Jessen	1. FC Köln	Hamburger SV	4–1 (A)	8 December 2025
(Germany) Nastassja Lein	1. FC Nürnberg	Eintracht Frankfurt	5–3 (H)	10 December 2025
(Switzerland) Géraldine Reuteler	Eintracht Frankfurt	Carl Zeiss Jena	4–1 (A)	15 February 2026
(Germany) Laura Freigang	Eintracht Frankfurt	Hamburger SV	4–1 (H)	21 March 2026
(Germany) Selina Cerci	TSG Hoffenheim	1. FC Köln	6–2 (H)	27 April 2026
(Germany) Larissa Mühlhaus	Werder Bremen	Carl Zeiss Jena	7–0 (H)	10 May 2026

=== Clean sheets ===
Rank	Player	Club	Clean sheets
1	(Germany) Ena Mahmutovic	Bayern Munich	11
2	(Germany) Laura Dick	TSG Hoffenheim	9
3	(Austria) Mariella El Sherif	Werder Bremen	7
3	(Germany) Maria Luisa Grohs	Bayern Munich	7
5	(Germany) Lina Altenburg	Eintracht Frankfurt	6
6	(Germany) Laura Benkarth	SC Freiburg	5
6	(Switzerland) Irina Fuchs	1. FC Köln	5
6	(Germany) Kim Sindermann	SGS Essen	5
9	(Germany) Cara Bösl	Union Berlin	3
9	(Switzerland) Elvira Herzog	RB Leipzig	3
9	(Germany) Friederike Repohl	Bayer Leverkusen	3

== See also ==
- 2025 DFB-Supercup Frauen
- 2025–26 DFB-Pokal Frauen
