= Hamburger SV (women) =

- Full name: Hamburger Sport-Verein e. V.
- Nicknames: Rothosen ("Red Shorts"); HSV
- Founded: 1970
- Ground: Volksparkstadion
- Capacity: 57,000
- President: Henrik Köncke
- Head coach: Liése Brancão
- League: Frauen-Bundesliga
- 2025–26: Bundesliga, 12th of 14
Home colours	Away colours	Third colours

Hamburger SV is a women's association football club from Hamburg, Germany. It is part of the Hamburger SV club.

== History ==
The women's section of Hamburger SV was created in 1970 and played in the Bundesliga continuously since the 2003–04 and 2011–12 seasons. The team reached the final of the 2002 German Cup but lost 5–0 to 1. FFC Frankfurt, and it enjoyed its best result in the Bundesliga, a 4th place, in the 2010–11 season. However, in May 2012 the club announced its disestablishment, with its reserve team becoming the first team in the 2012–13 Regionalliga.

After spending four years in the Regionalliga Nord, HSV faced relegation to the Verbandsliga Hamburg during the 2015–16 season. Their fortunes changed in 2018–19, as they clinched the championship without dropping any points and successfully returned to the Regionalliga after emerging victorious in the promotion round against ATS Buntentor. Despite winning the Regionalliga Nord championship title in the 2021–22 season, the club couldn't secure promotion to the 2. Bundesliga, losing to 1. FFC Turbine Potsdam II in the promotion play-off. However, in the 2022–23 season, HSV once again claimed the Regionalliga Nord championship and earned promotion to the 2. Bundesliga by winning both promotion matches against Viktoria Berlin.

On 11 May 2025, HSV secured promotion to the Bundesliga after 13 years, finishing among the top three following a 3–0 victory over SC Freiburg II.

== Squad ==
As of 31 August 2026

Note: Flags indicate national team as defined under FIFA eligibility rules; some limited exceptions apply. Players may hold more than one non-FIFA nationality.

No.	Pos.	Nation	Player
1	GK	GER	Laura Sieger
2	DF	FRA	Magou Doucouré
4	DF	AZE	Nigar Mirzaliyeva
5	DF	CUW	Celainy Obispo
6	DF	GER	Annaleen Böhler
7	FW	NOR	Camilla Linberg
8	MF	GER	Svea Stoldt
9	MF	GER	Melina Krüger
10	MF	GER	Carla Morich
11	FW	AUT	Melanie Brunnthaler
12	GK	POL	Kinga Szemik
14	DF	POL	Sylwia Matysik
15	MF	FRA	Leila Peneau
17	FW	CZE	Andrea Svibkova
18	DF	GER	Lena Martens

No.	Pos.	Nation	Player
19	FW	GER	Victoria Schulz
20	FW	POL	Nikola Karczewska
21	DF	GER	Jaqueline Dönges
22	FW	AUT	Sophie Hillebrand
23	FW	GER	Viktoria Schwalm
25	DF	GER	Inga Klinck
26	MF	GER	Jonna Wrede
28	MF	GER	Pauline Machtens (captain)
29	MF	GER	Leni Eggert
32	FW	GER	Lotta Wrede
33	GK	AUT	Larissa Haidner
36	GK	GER	Jule Baum
37	MF	GER	Paulina Bartz
39	DF	GER	Nina Räcke

== Former players ==
(Germany) Anna Blässe
(Germany) Britta Carlson
(Switzerland) Ana Maria Crnogorčević
(Sweden) Antonia Goransson
(Germany) Sarah Günther
(Germany) Kim Kulig
(Albania) Arjela Lako
(Denmark) Gitte Pedersen
(Germany) Lena Petermann
(Germany) Almuth Schult
(Germany) Toni Schmale
(Germany) Carolin Simon
(Germany) Shelley Thompson
(Germany) Claudia von Lanken
(Germany) Tanja Vreden
(Germany) Imke Wübbenhorst
(Australia) Carla Wilson
(Ghana) Janine Minta
(Croatia) Sara Schafer-Hansen

== Coaching staff ==
As of 13 April 2026

Position	Name
Head coach	(Argentina) Rodolfo Cardoso (Interim)
Assistant coach	(Germany) Eren Şen (Austria) Gerhard Waldhart
Goalkeeping coach	(Germany) Sascha Kirschstein
Fitness coach	(Germany) Felix Kleist
General manager	(Germany) Saskia Breuer
Team supervisor	(Germany) Melanie Machunze
Physiotherapists	(Germany) Justus Simon (Germany) Jennifer Kießlich
