= 2023–24 Eintracht Frankfurt (women) season =

Eintracht Frankfurt
2023–24 season
- Sporting Director: Katharina Kiel
- Head Coach: Niko Arnautis
- Stadium: Stadion am Brentanobad
- Frauen-Bundesliga: Pre–season
- DFB-Pokal Frauen: Second round
- Women's Champions League: Round 2

The 2023–24 Eintracht Frankfurt (women) season is the fourth season since 1. FFC Frankfurt became the women's association football team of Eintracht Frankfurt. On 21 June 2023, the German Football Association announced that the Eintracht Frankfurt women's team received their license, along with the rest Frauen-Bundesliga and 2. Frauen-Bundesliga clubs, for the 2023–24 season. Eintracht Frankfurt's season started on 6 September 2023 in the 2023–24 UEFA Women's Champions League.

== Competitions ==
=== Season review ===
==== League ====
===== September and October =====
Eintracht Frankfurt started their 2023–24 Frauen-Bundesliga campaign on 17 September 2023 against SGS Essen. The match took place on 17 September 2023 at Stadion an der Hafenstraße in Essen. SGS Essen won 2–0 with goals from Annalena Rieke and Laureta Elmazi. Eintracht Frankfurt finished matchday one in ninth place. Eintracht Frankfurt started October with a match against VfL Wolfsburg. The match took place on 1 October 2023 at Deutsche-Bank-Park in Frankfurt. VfL Wolfsburg won 4–2. Eintracht Frankfurt got a goal from a penalty shot from Laura Freigang and a goal from Barbara Dunst. Alexandra Popp, Lena Oberdorf, Joelle Wedemeyer, and Ewa Pajor scored for VfL Wolfsburg. Eintracht Frankfurt finished matchday two in 11th place.

==== DFB-Pokal Frauen ====
Eintracht Frankfurt's first match of the 2023–24 DFB-Pokal Frauen was in the second round against Hegauer FV. The match took place on 13 September 2023 at Hohentwiel-Stadion. Niko Arnautis made nine changes to the starting 11 from the UEFA Women's Champions League match against Juventus on 9 September 2023. Eintracht Frankfurt won 8–0 with two goals from Shekiera Martinez, an own goal from Malin Feldt, and a goal each from Jella Veit; Sophie Nachtigall; Ilayda Acikgöz; Lara Prašnikar, who scored from a penalty kick; and Geraldine Reuteler.

==== UEFA Women's Champions League ====
As the third–place team in the 2022–23 Frauen-Bundesliga, Eintracht Frankfurt qualified for Round 1 of qualifying of the 2023–24 UEFA Women's Champions League. In their opening first round match, Eintracht Frankfurt faced 1. FC Slovácko. The match took place on 6 September 2023 at Stadion am Brentanobad in Frankfurt, Germany. Eintracht Frankfurt won 1–0 with a goal from Lara Prašnikar. On 9 September 2023, in the Final of a first round tournament, Eintracht Frankfurt defeated Juventus in a shoot–out. The match finished in a 1–1 draw at the end of extra time. Lara Prašnikar scored for Eintracht Frankfurt and Sophia Cantore scored for Juventus. Eintracht Frankfurt won 5–4 in the shoot–out. Laura Freigang, Sophia Kleinherne, Barbara Dunst, Géraldine Reuteler, and Carlotta Wamser scored in the shoot–out for Eintracht Frankfurt.

=== Frauen-Bundesliga ===
==== Frauen-Bundesliga results ====
Date	Opponent	Venue	Results F–A	Goalscorers	Attendance	Pos.	Ref.
17 September 2023	SGS Essen	Away	0–2	—	2,033	9th	
1 October 2023	VfL Wolfsburg	Home	2–4	Freigang (Pen.), Dunst	13,500	11th	
8 October 2023	RB Leipzig	Home					
14 October 2023	Bayern Munich	Away					
22 October 2023	MSV Duisburg	Home					
5 November 2023	Werder Bremen	Away					
12 November 2023	Bayer Leverkusen	Home					
19 November 2023	1. FC Nürnberg	Away					
8 December 2023	1899 Hoffenheim	Home					
17 December 2023	SC Freiburg	Away					
28 January 2024	1. FC Köln	Home					
2 February 2024	SGS Essen	Home					
9 February 2024	VfL Wolfsburg	Away					
16 February 2024	RB Leipzig	Away					
8 March 2024	Bayern Munich	Home					
15 March 2024	MSV Duisburg	Away					
22 March 2024	Werder Bremen	Home					
12 April 2024	Bayer Leverkusen	Away					
19 April 2024	1. FC Nürnberg	Home					
3 May 2024	1899 Hoffenheim	Away					
10 May 2024	SC Freiburg	Home					
20 May 2024	1. FC Köln	Away					

==== League table ====
Pos	Team	Pld	W	D	L	GF	GA	GD	Pts	Qualification or relegation
1	Bayern Munich (C)	22	19	3	0	60	8	+52	60	Qualification for Champions League group stage
2	VfL Wolfsburg	22	17	2	3	67	19	+48	53	Qualification for Champions League second round
3	Eintracht Frankfurt	22	14	2	6	42	25	+17	44	Qualification for Champions League first round
4	SGS Essen	22	10	5	7	33	26	+7	35	
5	TSG Hoffenheim	22	10	4	8	43	35	+8	34	
6	Bayer Leverkusen	22	8	7	7	34	25	+9	31	
7	Werder Bremen	22	8	4	10	34	31	+3	28	
8	RB Leipzig	22	7	5	10	26	41	−15	26	
9	SC Freiburg	22	6	6	10	26	44	−18	24	
10	1. FC Köln	22	5	3	14	25	43	−18	18	
11	1. FC Nürnberg (R)	22	4	3	15	16	61	−45	15	Relegation to 2. Bundesliga
12	MSV Duisburg (R)	22	0	4	18	16	64	−48	4	Demotion to Regionalliga

Source: DFB
Rules for classification: 1) Points; 2) Goal difference; 3) Goals scored; 4) Head-to-head results; 5) Head-to-head away goals scored; 6) Away goals scored; 7) Play-off.
(C) Champions; (R) Relegated

==== League results overview ====
Overall								Home						Away					
Pld	W	D	L	GF	GA	GD	Pts	W	D	L	GF	GA	GD	W	D	L	GF	GA	GD
5	2	1	2	10	8	+2	7	2	0	1	10	6	+4	0	1	1	0	2	−2

Last updated: 23 October 2023.
Source: Competitions

=== DFB-Pokal Frauen results ===
Date	Round	Opponent	Venue	Result F–A	Goalscorers	Attendance	Ref.
13 September 2023	2	Hegauer FV	Away	8–0	Veit, Martinez (2), Nachtigall, Acikgöz, Prašnikar (Pen.), Feldt (O.G.), Reuteler	1,240	

=== UEFA Women's Champions League ===
==== UEFA Women's Champions League results ====
===== Qualifying rounds =====
Date	Round	Opponent	Venue	Result F–A	Goalscorers	Attendance	Ref.
6 September 2023	R1 – SF	1. FC Slovácko	Home	1–0	Prašnikar	2,923	
9 September 2023	R1 – F	Juventus	Home	1–1 ( AET); 5–4 (SO)	Prašnikar	6,100	
10 October 2023	R2 – FL	Sparta Prague	Home	5-0	Anyomi, Freigang (3), Reuteler	5,500	
18 October 2023	R2 – SL	Sparta Prague	Away	3-0	Dunst (3)	1,484	

===== Group Stage =====
Pos	Team	Pld	W	D	L	GF	GA	GD	Pts	Qualification	BAR	BEN	FRA	ROS
1	(Spain) Barcelona	6	5	1	0	27	5	+22	16	Advance to quarter-finals	—	5–0	2–0	7–0
2	(Portugal) Benfica	6	2	3	1	9	12	−3	9	Advance to quarter-finals	4–4	—	1–0	1–0
3	(Germany) Eintracht Frankfurt	6	2	1	3	9	8	+1	7		1–3	1–1	—	5–0
4	(Sweden) Rosengård	6	0	1	5	3	23	−20	1		0–6	2–2	1–2	—

Source: UEFA
Rules for classification: Group stage tiebreakers

=== Overall record ===
Competition	First match	Last match	Starting round	Final position	Record							
Competition	First match	Last match	Starting round	Final position	Pld	W	D	L	GF	GA	GD	Win %
Frauen-Bundesliga	17 September 2023	20 May 2024	Matchday 1	TBD	5	2	1	2	10	8	+2	40.00
DFB-Pokal Frauen	13 September 2023	TBD	Second round	TBD	1	1	0	0	8	0	+8	100.00
UEFA Women's Champions League	6 September 2023	TBD	First round	TBD	4	3	1	0	10	1	+9	75.00
Total					10	6	2	2	28	9	+19	60.00

Source: Competitions

== Roster and statistics ==
=== Roster and statistics ===
==== Goalscorers ====
As of match played 13 September 2023

Goalscorers in all competitions
Player	Goals
Lara Prašnikar	3
Shekiera Martinez	2
Jella Veit	1
Sophie Nachtigall	1
Ilayda Acikgöz	1
Geraldine Reuteler	1
Own goals	1

Frauen-Bundesliga goalscorers
Player	Goals
None–to–date	0

DFB-Pokal Frauen goalscorers
Player	Goals
Shekiera Martinez	2
Jella Veit	1
Sophie Nachtigall	1
Ilayda Acikgöz	1
Lara Prašnikar	1
Geraldine Reuteler	1
Own goals	1

UEFA Women's Champions League goalscorers
Player	Goals
Lara Prašnikar	2

==== Own goals ====
Own goals by Eintracht Frankfurt players
No.	Player	Competition	Opponent	Final score	Ref.
1	None–to–date			—	

Own goals by opposing players
No.	Player	Competition	Team	Final score	Ref.
1	Malin Feldt	DFB-Pokal Frauen	Hegauer FV	8–0	

=== Other statistics ===
==== Discipline ====
As of match played 9 September 2023

Yellow and red cards from all competitions
Players	Yellow card	(yellow card) (red card)	Red card
Geraldine Reuteler	1	0	0
Totals	1	0	0

Yellow and red cards in Frauen-Bundesliga
Players	Yellow card	(yellow card) (red card)	Red card
None–to date	0	0	0
Totals	0	0	0

Yellow and red cards from the DFB-Pokal Frauen
Players	Yellow card	(yellow card) (red card)	Red card
None–to date	0	0	0
Totals	0	0	0

Yellow and red cards from the UEFA Women's Champions League
Players	Yellow card	(yellow card) (red card)	Red card
Geraldine Reuteler	1	0	0
Totals	1	0	0

==== Clean sheets ====
As of match played 6 September 2023

Clean sheets
No.	Goalkeeper	Competition	Opponent	Final score	Ref.
1	Stina Johannes	UEFA Women's Champions League	1. FC Slovácko	1–0	
2	Cara Bösl	DFB-Pokal Frauen	Hegauer FV	8–0	

== Transfers ==
Transferred in
Pos.	Name	Age	EU	Moving from	Type	Transfer Window	Ref.
Midfielder	Lisanne Gräwe	20	Yes	Bayer Leverkusen	Transfer	Summer	
Midfielder	Pia-Sophie Wolter	25	Yes	VfL Wolfsburg	Loan	Summer	
Defender	Nadine Riesen	23	No	FC Zürich	Transfer	Summer	

Transferred out
Pos.	Name	Age	EU	Moving to	Type	Transfer Window	Ref.
Defender	Camilla Küver	20	Yes	VfL Wolfsburg	Transfer	Summer	
Midfielder	Laura Feiersinger	30	Yes	AS Roma	Transfer	Summer	
Midfielder	Leonie Köster	22	Yes	FC Basel	Transfer	Summer	
Midfielder	Sjoeke Nüsken	22	Yes	Chelsea	Transfer	Summer	
Defender	Madeleine Steck	21	Yes	1. FC Nürnberg	Transfer	Summer	

== Coaching staff ==
Position	Coach
Head coach:	Niko Arnautis
Assistant coach:	Christos Arnautis
Assistant coach:	Kai Rennich
Goalkeeping coach:	Dennis Tiano
Game analyst:	Bayram Mechmet
Athletic coach:	Fabian Meier
Athletic coach:	Torsten Schröder
