= Remina Chiba =

Japanese footballer (born 1999)

Remina Chiba 千葉 玲海菜
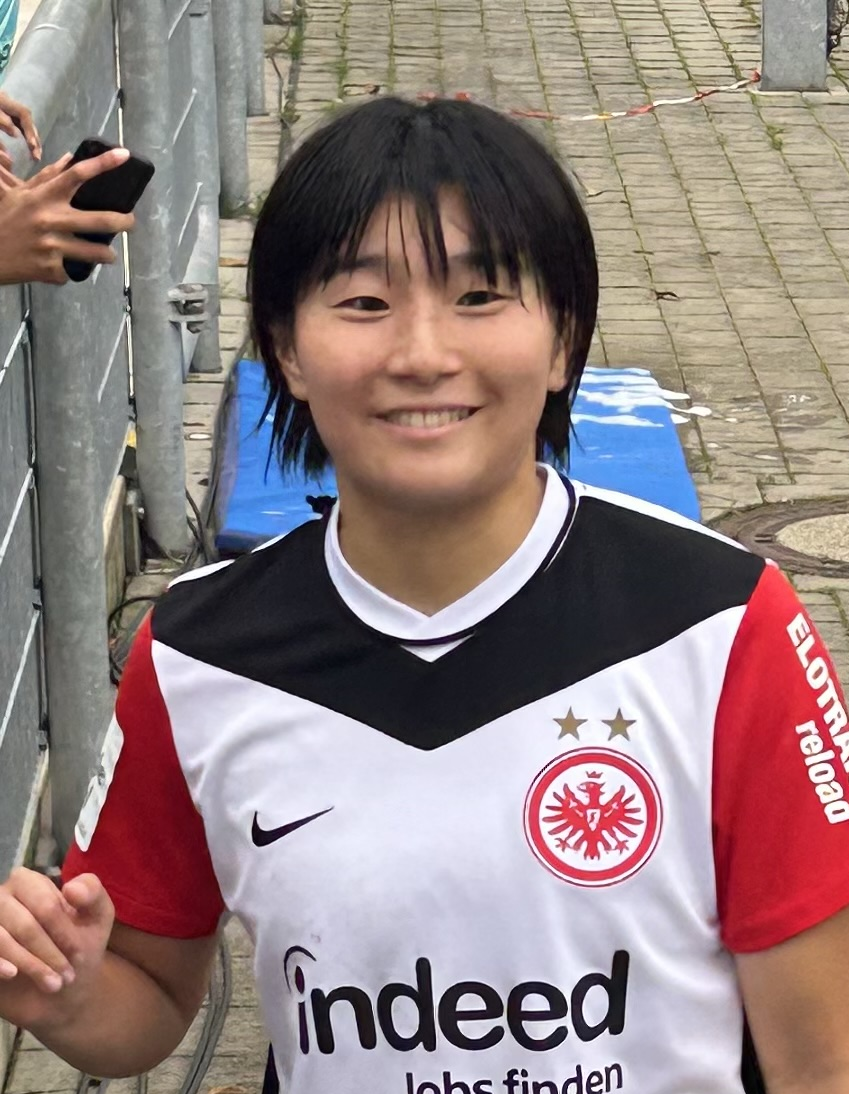
- Chiba in 2024

Personal information
- Date of birth: 30 April 1999 (age 27)
- Place of birth: Fukushima, Japan
- Height: 1.62 m (5 ft 4 in)
- Position: Forward

Team information
- Current team: Juventus
- Number: 22

Youth career
- 2005–2011: Suzukake SSS
- 2012–2014: Liberdade Iwaki
- 2015–2017: Fujieda Junshin High School

College career
Years	Team	Apps	(Gls)
2018–2022	University of Tsukuba		

Senior career*
Years	Team	Apps	(Gls)
2018–2024	JEF United Chiba	28	(10)
2024–2026	Eintracht Frankfurt	55	(14)
2026–	Juventus	6	(2)

International career^{‡}
2022–	Japan	28	(6)
Medal record
Women's football
Representing Japan
AFC Women's Asian Cup
Winner	2026 Australia
- * Club domestic league appearances and goals as of 21 November 2026 ‡ National team caps and goals as of 13 October 2026 (UTC)

Remina Chiba (千葉 玲海菜, Chiba Remina; born 30 April 1999) is a Japanese professional footballer who plays as a forward for Serie A club Juventus and the Japan national team. She has previously played for WE League club JEF United Chiba and German Frauen-Bundesliga club Eintracht Frankfurt.

== Club career ==
On 10 January 2024, Chiba was announced at Eintracht Frankfurt on a two and a half year contract. On October 15, 2024, while playing for Eintracht Frankfurt, she came on as a substitute in the 78th minute against SC Freiburg and scored a hat trick in just 4 minutes. She spent two-and-a-half years in Frankfurt, making 72 appearances across all competitions, before departing from the club in July 2026. On 23 July 2026, Chiba signed a two-year contract with Serie A club Juventus.

== International career ==
On 24 June 2022, Chiba debuted for Japan national team against Serbia. On 13 June 2023, she was included in Japan's 23-player squad for the FIFA Women's World Cup 2023.

On 22 July 2023 she made her first World Cup appearance against Zambia in the first round of the 2023 FIFA Women's World Cup Group C.

On 14 June 2024, Chiba was included in the Japan squad for the 2024 Summer Olympics.

Chiba was part of the Japan squad that won the 2025 SheBelieves Cup.

== Career statistics ==
=== Club ===
As of match played 15 November 2026

Appearances and goals by club, season and competition
Club	Season	League			National cup (Note: Includes Empress's Cup, DFB-Pokal Frauen)		League cup (Note: Includes Nadeshiko League Cup, WE League Cup, Serie A Women's Cup)		Continental		Total	
Club	Season	Division	Apps	Goals	Apps	Goals	Apps	Goals	Apps	Goals	Apps	Goals
JEF United Chiba	2018	Nadeshiko League 1	0	0	0	0	0	0	—		0	0
JEF United Chiba	2019	Nadeshiko League 1	3	0	0	0	0	0	—		3	0
JEF United Chiba	2020	Nadeshiko League 1	3	0	0	0	0	0	—		3	0
JEF United Chiba	2021–22	WE League	10	6	0	0	—		—		10	6
JEF United Chiba	2022–23	WE League	6	3	0	0	4	0	—		10	3
JEF United Chiba	2023–24	WE League	6	1	1	1	3	0	—		10	2
JEF United Chiba	Total		28	10	1	1	7	0	0	0	36	11
Eintracht Frankfurt	2023–24	Frauen-Bundesliga	12	2	2	0	—		—		14	2
Eintracht Frankfurt	2024–25	Frauen-Bundesliga	21	7	3	1	—		2 (Note: Appearance(s) in UEFA Women's Champions League)	2	26	9
Eintracht Frankfurt	2025–26	Frauen-Bundesliga	22	5	2	1	—		7	2	31	8
Eintracht Frankfurt	Total		55	14	7	2	0	0	9	4	71	20
Juventus	2026–27	Serie A Femminile	6	2	0	0	5	1	6	2	17	5
Career total			89	26	8	4	12	1	15	6	125	36

=== International ===
As of match played 13 October 2026

National team	Year	Apps	Goals
Japan	2022	4	2
Japan	2023	4	1
Japan	2024	8	1
Japan	2025	4	0
Japan	2026	8	3
Total		28	7

Scores and results list Japan's goal tally first, score column indicates score after each Chiba goal

List of international goals scored by Remina Chiba
No.	Date	Venue	Opponent	Score	Result	Competition
1	24 June 2022	Serbian FA Sports Center, Stara Pazova, Serbia	Serbia	4–0	5–0	Friendly
2	23 July 2022	Kashima Soccer Stadium, Kashima, Japan	Chinese Taipei	1–1	4–1	2022 EAFF E-1 Football Championship
3	29 October 2023	Milliy Stadium, Tashkent, Uzbekistan	Uzbekistan	2–0	2–0	2024 AFC Women's Olympic Qualifying Tournament
4	3 June 2024	Estadio Nueva Condomina, Murcia, Spain	New Zealand	4–1	4–1	Friendly
5	15 March 2026	Stadium Australia, Sydney, Australia	Philippines	3–0	7–0	2026 AFC Women's Asian Cup
6	18 March 2026	Stadium Australia, Sydney, Australia	South Korea	4–1	4–1	2026 AFC Women's Asian Cup
7	9 October 2026	Stade Bauer, Saint-Ouen-sur-Seine, France	Haiti	4–1	5–1	Friendly

== Honours ==
Japan

- AFC Women's Asian Cup: 2026
- EAFF Women's Football Championship: 2022
- Asian Games: 2023
