= Women's football in Germany =

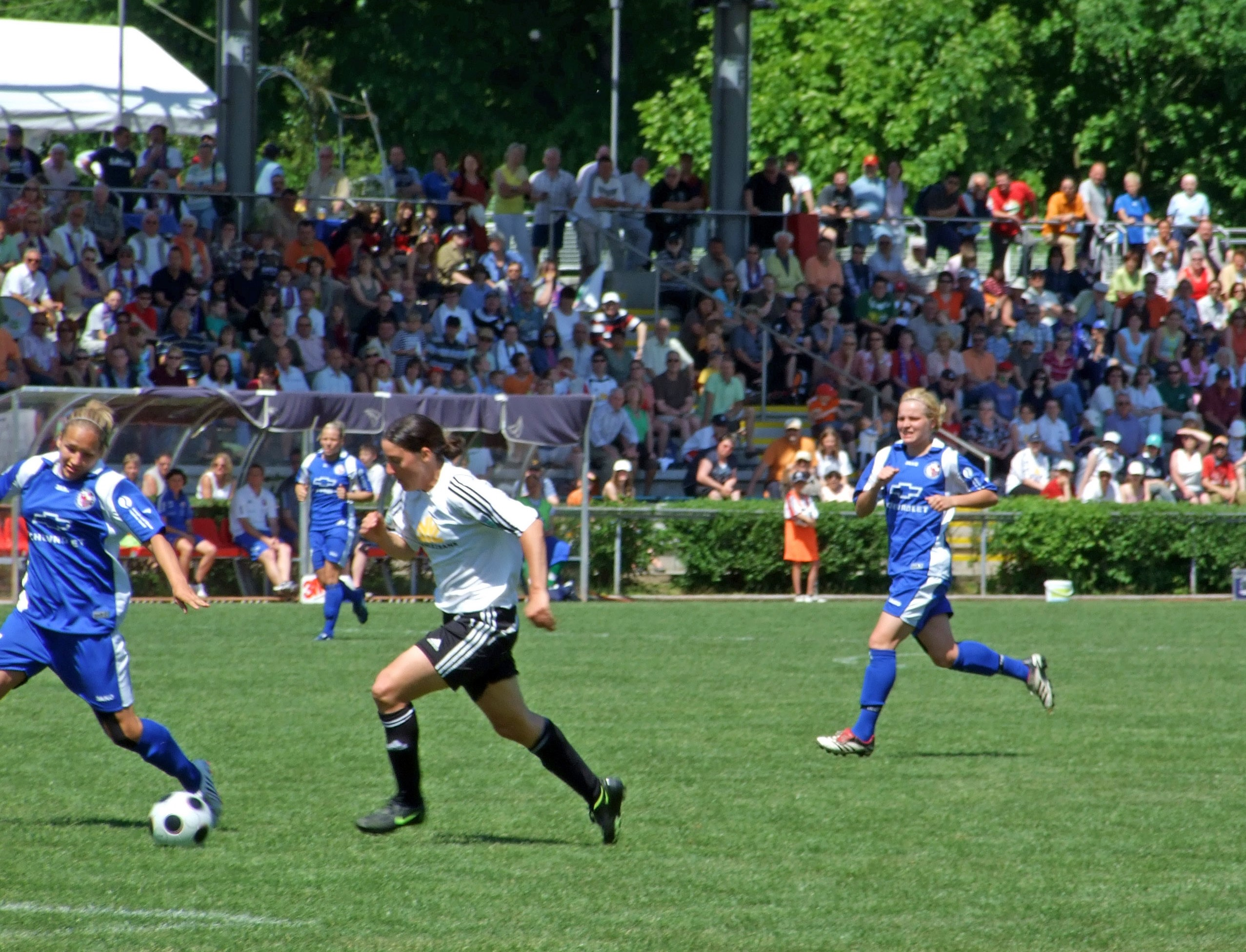
- Frankfurt playing Potsdam in the women's Bundesliga
- Country: Germany
- Governing body: Deutscher Fußball-Bund e.V.
- National team: Women's national team

National competitions
- DFB Cup

Club competitions
- Bundesliga

International competitions
- Champions League; FIFA Women's World Cup (National Team); European Championship(National Team); Olympics(National Team)

Women's football is quickly becoming very popular in Germany largely due to the success of the women's national team.

== History ==
Women in Germany have been playing football since the turn of the 18th century, but women playing sports were frowned upon by the general population and citizens. The "Sports Girl" did not come into fashion until the 1920s when women started to form their own clubs. Lotte Specht was one of the first female to form a women's only football club. Christa Kleinhans was another pioneer of women's football in Germany. In 1955 the German Football Association declared that they would not permit women into the association stating that women were frail and unable to perform in the sport without injuring themselves. During the 1960s there was discussion about setting up a Woman's Football Association, but it never panned out.

The DFB finally officially allowed women players on October 30, 1970, but there were modifications to the rules. Firstly, women were only allowed to play in warm weather. Secondly, football boots with studs were banned and the ball was smaller and lighter. Lastly, the length of a match was reduced to seventy minutes.

In 1971 a women's league was formed, with many other leagues established during the following years. On September 8, 1974, the first women's champion in football was awarded to TuS Wörrstadt.

The first women's DFB Cup was held in 1981 with SSG 09 Bergisch Gladbach defeating TuS Wörrstadt 5–0 in the final match in front of 35,000 spectators.

The women's national team (coached by Gero Bisanz) played its first game (as West Germany) on November 10, 1982, against Switzerland. Germany won the match 5–1. Two players who scored in the game would eventually become coaches for the national team.

In 1989 West Germany hosted the 1989 European Competition for Women's Football. The German team beat the Italian team on a penalty shoot-off. This was the first women's football game broadcast live in Germany. On July 2, 1989, the German team beat the favored Norwegian team 4–1 in front of 23,000 spectators. This was an attendance record for a German women's team that would last until May 24, 2008, when 27,460 spectators watched 1. FFC Frankfurt defeat Umeå IK 3–2 in the UEFA Women's Cup.

== National competition ==
As a result of the national team's success in the 1989 European Competition, in 1990 the DFB founded the first women's Bundesliga with twenty teams divided into two groups, a Northern Conference and a Southern Conference. The Bundesliga was reduced to a single league of twelve teams in 1997. However, with the growing strength of Regionalliga compared to the Bundesliga, the DFB founded Second Bundesliga in 2004. The Second Bundesliga contained twenty-four teams divided into two groups.

Level	League(s)/Division(s)				
I	Frauen-Bundesliga; 14 clubs				
II	2. Frauen-Bundesliga; 14 clubs				
III	Regionalliga Nord; 14 clubs	Regionalliga Nordost; 12 clubs	Regionalliga West; 14 clubs	Regionalliga Südwest; 14 clubs	Regionalliga Süd; 14 clubs
IV	Niedersachsenliga Ost; Niedersachsenliga West; Verbandsliga Bremen; Verbandsliga Hamburg; Schleswig-Holstein-Liga	Landesliga Sachsen; Landesliga Sachsen-Anhalt; Verbandsliga Berlin; Verbandsliga Brandenburg; Verbandsliga Mecklenburg-Vorpommern; Verbandsliga Thüringen	Verbandsliga Mittelrhein; Verbandsliga Niederrhein; Verbandsliga Westfalen	Verbandsliga Rheinland; Verbandsliga Saarland; Verbandsliga Südwest	Bayernliga; Oberliga Baden-Württemberg; Oberliga Hessen
V	Landesliga Niedersachsen; Landesliga Bremen; Landesliga Hamburg; Verbandsliga Schleswig-Holstein	Landesklasse Sachsen; Landesklasse Thüringen; Landesliga Berlin; Landesliga Brandenburg; Kreisoberliga Mecklenburg-Vorpommern; Regionalklasse Sachsen-Anhalt	Landesliga Mittelrhein; Landesliga Niederrhein; Landesliga Westfalen	Bezirksliga Rheinland; Landesliga Saarland; Landesliga Südwest	Landesliga Bayern; Verbandsliga Baden; Verbandsliga Südbaden; Verbandsliga Hessen; Verbandsliga Württemberg
VI	Bezirksliga Niedersachsen; Bezirksliga Bremen; Bezirksliga Hamburg; Kreisliga Schleswig-Holstein	Kreisoberliga Sachsen; Kreisoberliga Thüringen; Bezirksliga Berlin; Kreisliga Brandenburg; Kreisliga Mecklenburg-Vorpommern; Kreisliga Sachsen-Anhalt	Bezirksliga Mittelrhein; Bezirksliga Niederrhein; Bezirksliga Westfalen	Kreisklasse Rheinland; Bezirksliga Saarland; Bezirksliga Südwest	Bezirksoberliga Bayern; Landesliga Baden; Bezirksliga Südbaden; Gruppenliga Hessen; Landesliga Württemberg
VII	Kreisliga Niedersachsen; Stadtliga Bremen; Kreisliga Hamburg; Kreisklasse A Schleswig-Holstein	Kreisliga Sachsen; Kreisliga Thüringen; 1. Kreisklasse Brandenburg; 1. Kreisklasse Sachsen-Anhalt	Kreisliga Mittelrhein; Kreisliga Niederrhein; Kreisliga A Westfalen	Bezirksklasse Saarland	Bezirksliga Bayern; Kreisliga Baden; 1. Kreisliga Südbaden; Kreisoberliga Hessen; Regionenliga Württemberg
VIII	1. Kreisklasse Niedersachsen	1. Kreisklasse Sachsen	Kreisliga B Westfalen		Kreisliga Bayern; 2. Kreisliga Südbaden; Kreisliga A Hessen; Bezirksliga Württemberg
IX	2. Kreisklasse Niedersachsen	2. Kreisklasse Sachsen			Kreisklasse Bayern; Kreisliga B Hessen; Kreisliga Württemberg
X					A-Klasse Bayern

Source:"German football leagues". Fussball.de.

- All leagues on same level run parallel.

== National team ==
The Germany women's national football team, organised by the DFB, are the only women's team ever to have successfully defended the FIFA Women's World Cup, winning in 2003 under coach Tina Theune-Meyer and 2007 under Silvia Neid. They also won eight UEFA Women's Championships (1989, 1991, 1995, 1997, 2001, 2005, 2009, 2013).

== Women's Honours ==
=== Major competitions ===
FIFA Women's World Cup

- Champions (2): 2003, 2007
- Runners-up (1): 1995
- Fourth place (2): 1991, 2015

UEFA Women's Championship

- Champions (8): 1989, 1991, 1995, 1997, 2001, 2005, 2009, 2013
- Runners-up (1): 2022
- Fourth place (1): 1993

Summer Olympic Games

- Gold Medal (1): 2016
- Bronze Medal (3): 2000, 2004, 2008

Overview
Event	1st place	2nd place	3rd place	4th place
FIFA Women's World Cup	2	1	0	2
UEFA Women's Championship	8	1	0	1
Summer Olympic Games	1	0	3	0
Total	11	2	3	3

== See also ==
- Football in Germany
- German women's football league system
- Bans of women's association football
