= Christa Kleinhans =

German association footballer (born 1937)

Personal information
- Date of birth: 22 July 1937 (age 89)
- Place of birth: Dortmund, Germany
- Position: Midfielder

Christa Kleinhans (born 22 July 1937) is a former German handball player who was one of the founders of women's football in Germany.
