= Eintracht Frankfurt (women) =

German women's association football club

- Founded: 1973; 53 years ago, as SG Praunheim
- Ground: Stadion am Brentanobad
- Capacity: 5,200
- President: Mathias Beck
- Sporting director: Katharina Kiel
- Head coach: Niko Arnautis
- League: Frauen-Bundesliga
- 2025–26: Bundesliga, 3rd of 14
- Website: frauen.eintracht.de
Home colours	Away colours	Third colours

Eintracht Frankfurt is a German women's association football club based in Frankfurt. Its first team currently plays in the German top flight, Frauen-Bundesliga. From 1998 to 2020, the club was known as 1. FFC Frankfurt.

Eintracht have won seven German women's football championships, nine Frauen DFB-Pokals, and four UEFA Women's Champions League titles (trailing only Lyon). Eintracht play at the Stadion am Brentanobad, and their biggest rivals are 1. FFC Turbine Potsdam.

== History ==
The club has its origin as SG Praunheim, with Praunheim establishing its women's football department in 1973. This iteration of the club did not participate in the national championship or cup tournaments, but nonetheless was included in the nascent Bundesliga at its inception in 1990. In the early 1990s Praunheim achieved mid-table results with a tendency for slight improvements from season to season.

The foundation for the club's later success was laid in the 1993–94 season when former captain Monika Staab, as coach and head of the women's football division, and Siegfried Dietrich, as manager and investor, developed the first professional club model in German women's football. The club qualified for the playoffs for the German football championship for the first time in 1995–96, losing the final 0–1 to TSV Siegen. In the following seasons they managed to stay amongst the top clubs in German football, but won no titles, often behind local rival FSV Frankfurt.

Former logo as 1. FFC Frankfurt (1999–2020)

On 1 January 1999, the women's department left Praunheim to form 1. FFC Frankfurt. The club had success immediately, winning the cup and the championship in their first season. In 1999–2000 they won their second cup, but lost the championship to FCR Duisburg. From 2000 to 2003 the club won three consecutive doubles while also rising to the pinnacle of European football with a victory in the UEFA Women's Cup's inaugural season in 2002. In 2003–04, the club was overtaken by new title rivals Turbine Potsdam, who won a double of their own to leave Frankfurt without a trophy after the club had won ten titles in the previous five years.

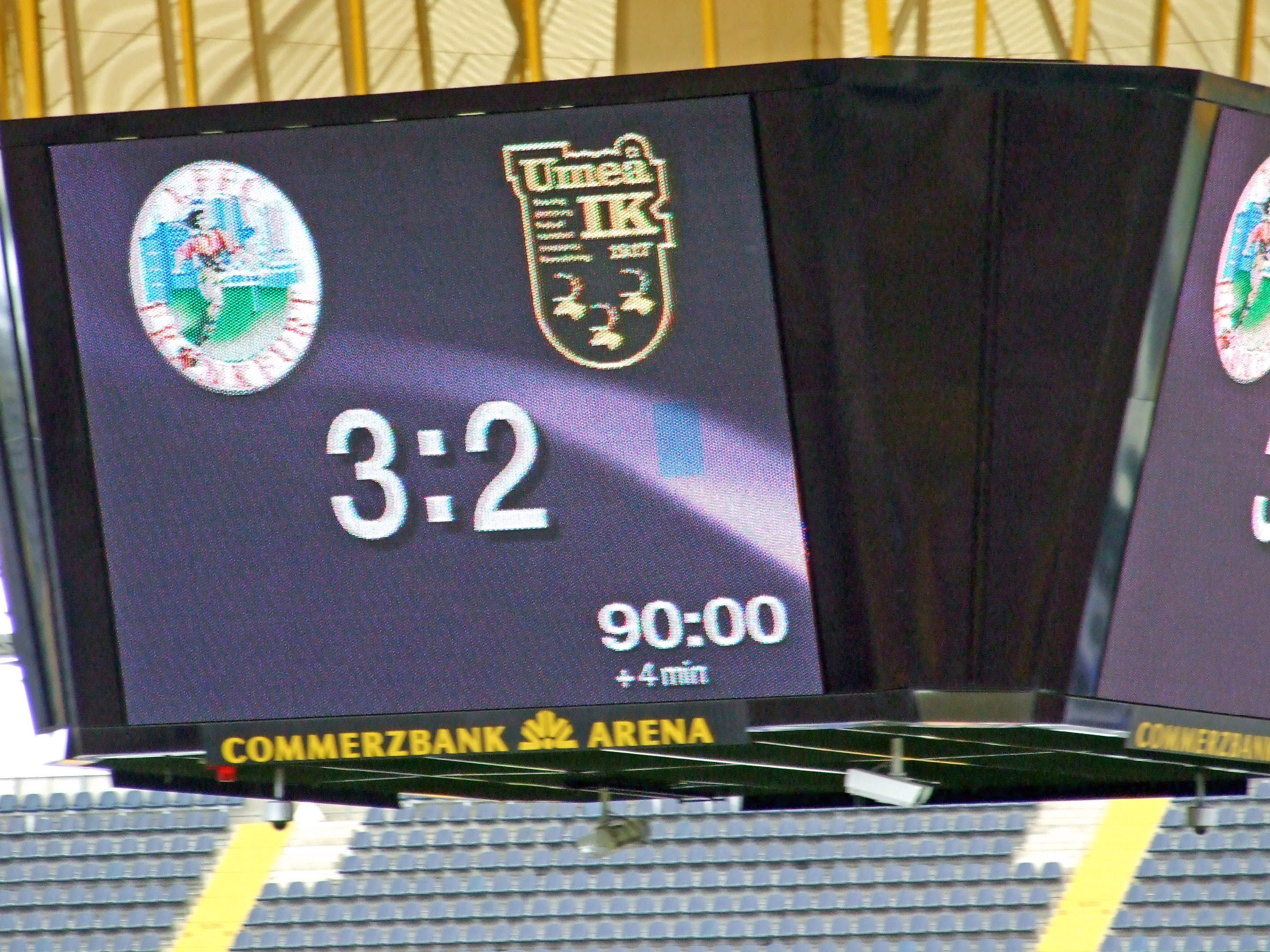
The scoreboard during the 2008 UEFA Women's Cup final

European success eluded the German clubs in the second and third seasons of the UEFA Women's Cup, as Umeå from Sweden won two consecutive titles, brushing Frankfurt away 8–0 on aggregate in the 2004 final. After Turbine had won its own UEFA Women's Cup title in 2005 both clubs met in the 2006 UEFA Women's Cup final. After a 4–0 victory at Potsdam in the first leg, the club coasted to their second European title with a 3–2 victory in the return fixture. The second leg of the final was attended by a record crowd of 13,100, with German chancellor Angela Merkel amongst the spectators.

Having lost the preceding three domestic cup finals to Potsdam, the club won another domestic double in 2006–07, but lost in the quarter-finals of the UEFA Women's Cup to Norwegian club Kolbotn. In the 2007–08 season, they won their second treble, with the second leg of the final against Umeå attended by 27,640, a new record attendance for a women's club football game in Europe at the time.

The club's performance dropped considerably in the 2008–09 season. A fourth-place finish in the league was the club's worst performance since a uniform Bundesliga was put into place, and they did not reach the DFB-Pokal Frauen final for the first time since 1998 after losing in the second round to Bayern Munich. This marked their worst domestic cup performance since 1991–92. In the UEFA Women's Cup, they were eliminated by FCR 2001 Duisburg in the quarter-finals.

In 2019, the club announced a proposed merger with the men's football club Eintracht Frankfurt. The merger was confirmed in June 2020 and, starting from 1 July 2020, the club would now compete as the women's football department of Eintracht Frankfurt. In addition to the first team, the department would include up to five women's teams competing at various levels of women's football.

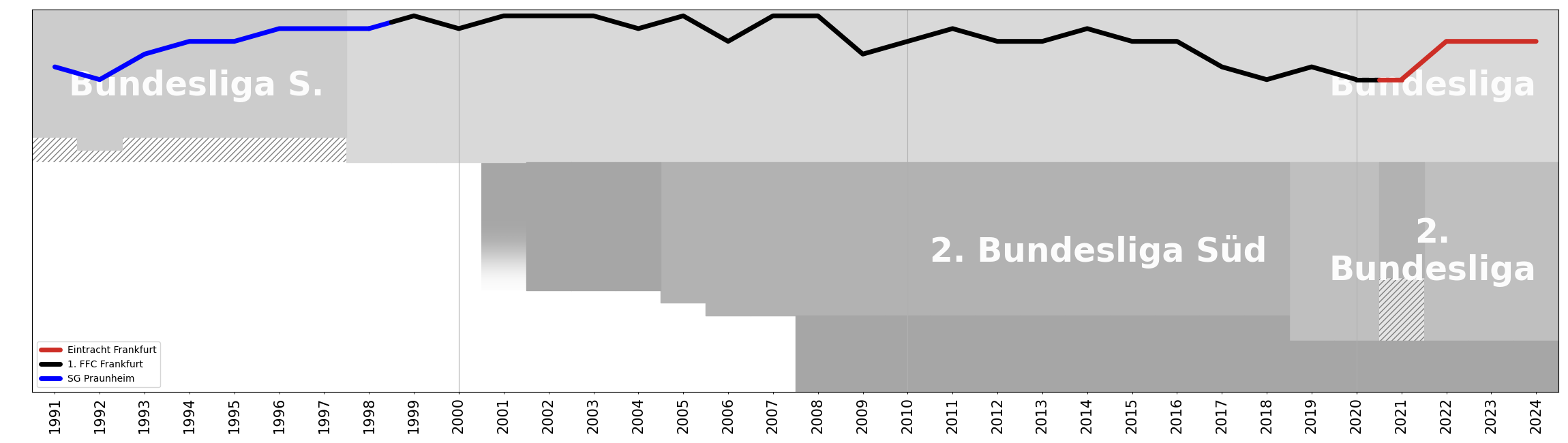
Historical league performance of Eintracht Frankfurt

== Stadium ==
Eintracht plays their homegames in the Stadion am Brentanobad, a stadium in the Rödelheim district of Frankfurt they share with the men's team of Rot-Weiss Frankfurt. Stadion am Brentobad is owned by the city of Frankfurt and has a capacity of 5,200 with 1,100 of those being roofed seats. In recent seasons Eintracht had the highest attendance average in the Bundesliga with more than 1,000 spectators on average.

On a few occasions, Eintracht has held their homegames at the Commerzbank-Arena, home stadium of the men's football department. The 2006 UEFA Women's Cup final between the club and Potsdam in 2006 was attended by 13,100 spectators, which remains a record for European club football matches.

== Rivalries ==
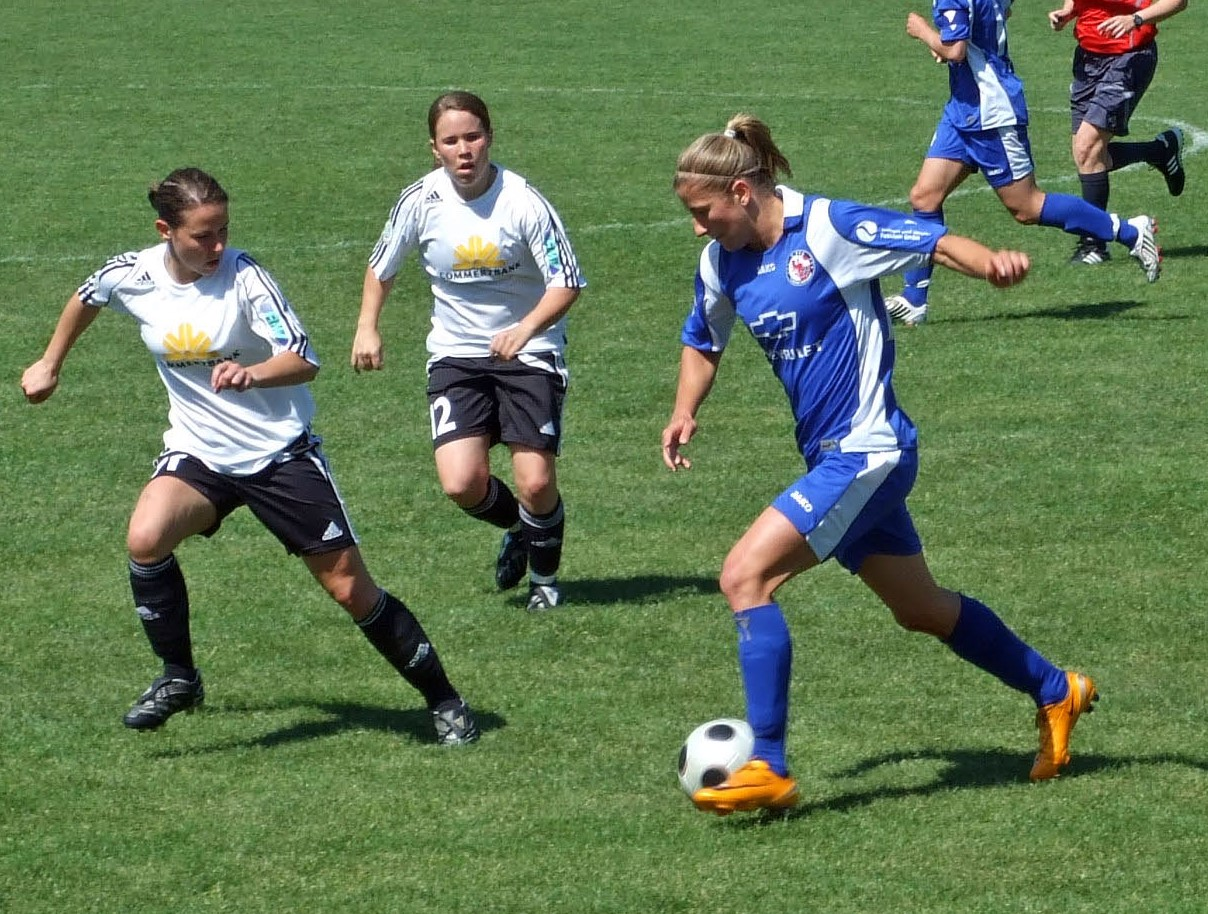
Frankfurt against Potsdam in May 2008

A rivalry developed between the club and former East German women's champions 1. FFC Turbine Potsdam early in the 2000s as that club began its own ascent to the Bundesliga. That rivalry spilled over into the DFB Pokal and the European Cup when Potsdam qualified by taking the national title from Frankfurt and succeeded them as European champions.

Aside from the sporting and east–west rivalry, the two clubs have different team-building philosophies. Frankfurt, prefers buying local and foreign players, while Potsdam, focuses on the development of young players within its own club-system. The defection of Petra Wimbersky and Karolin Thomas from Potsdam to Frankfurt inflamed the rivalry, as the two clubs had abided by an unwritten agreement not to poach each other's players without first consulting the German Football Association.

Due to the lack of hooliganism in the women's game, this rivalry has developed healthy competition within the Bundesliga and has strongly contributed to the success of the women's national team. There were fears of a potential Old Firm-style duopoly problem, as these two clubs were the wealthiest in the women's game and there was a concern that the league's competitiveness could be hindered if they become too dominant. New competitors arrived on the scene with the rise of the women's departments of VfL Wolfsburg and FC Bayern München to seemingly resolve this issue, but by the end of the 2010s these two teams had replaced Frankfurt and Potsdam as the dominant pair in the country.

== Players ==
=== First-team squad ===
As of 21 August 2026

Note: Flags indicate national team as defined under FIFA eligibility rules; some limited exceptions apply. Players may hold more than one non-FIFA nationality.

No.	Pos.	Nation	Player
1	GK	GER	Sophia Winkler
4	MF	SUI	Noemi Ivelj
6	MF	DEN	Sofie Lundgaard
7	MF	KOS	Erëleta Memeti
8	MF	SWE	Hanna Bennison
9	MF	BEL	Jarne Teulings
10	FW	GER	Laura Freigang (captain)
11	DF	GER	Nina Lührßen
12	GK	GER	Lina Altenburg
13	DF	SWE	Amanda Ilestedt
14	DF	NOR	Marthine Østenstad
15	DF	AUS	Jamilla Rankin
16	MF	AUS	Hayley Raso

No.	Pos.	Nation	Player
17	DF	GER	Pia-Sophie Wolter
18	MF	GER	Elâ Demirbaş
21	GK	GER	Janne Krumme
22	FW	NED	Danique Tolhoek
23	DF	GER	Sara Doorsoun
24	FW	ENG	Vivienne Lia
26	MF	ESP	Ainhoa Alguacil
27	MF	GER	Paulina Krumbiegel
28	FW	SWE	Rebecka Blomqvist
29	DF	GER	Dilara Açıkgöz
31	MF	GER	Tessa Zimmermann
47	FW	GER	Larissa Mühlhaus
—	DF	SRB	Mina Matijevic

=== Reserves and youth teams ===
The entire women's football department operates five teams at the top five levels of German women's football league system respectively. Besides the first team, the reserves team, Eintracht II, compete in the 2. Frauen-Bundesliga. There are three additional youth teams for development.

Prior to the merger between 1. FFC Frankfurt and Eintracht Frankfurt on 1 July 2020, Eintracht had an existing women's football section of three teams (two senior and one youth), with its first team competing in the third-tier Regionalliga Süd. It was founded in 2014, began play in the sixth-tier Bezirksliga, and won the Regionalliga Süd in 2018 and the Hessenliga in 2012 and 2017. Those two senior teams became youth teams after the merger, and all three teams continue to play in the third to fifth tiers respectively.

== Honours ==
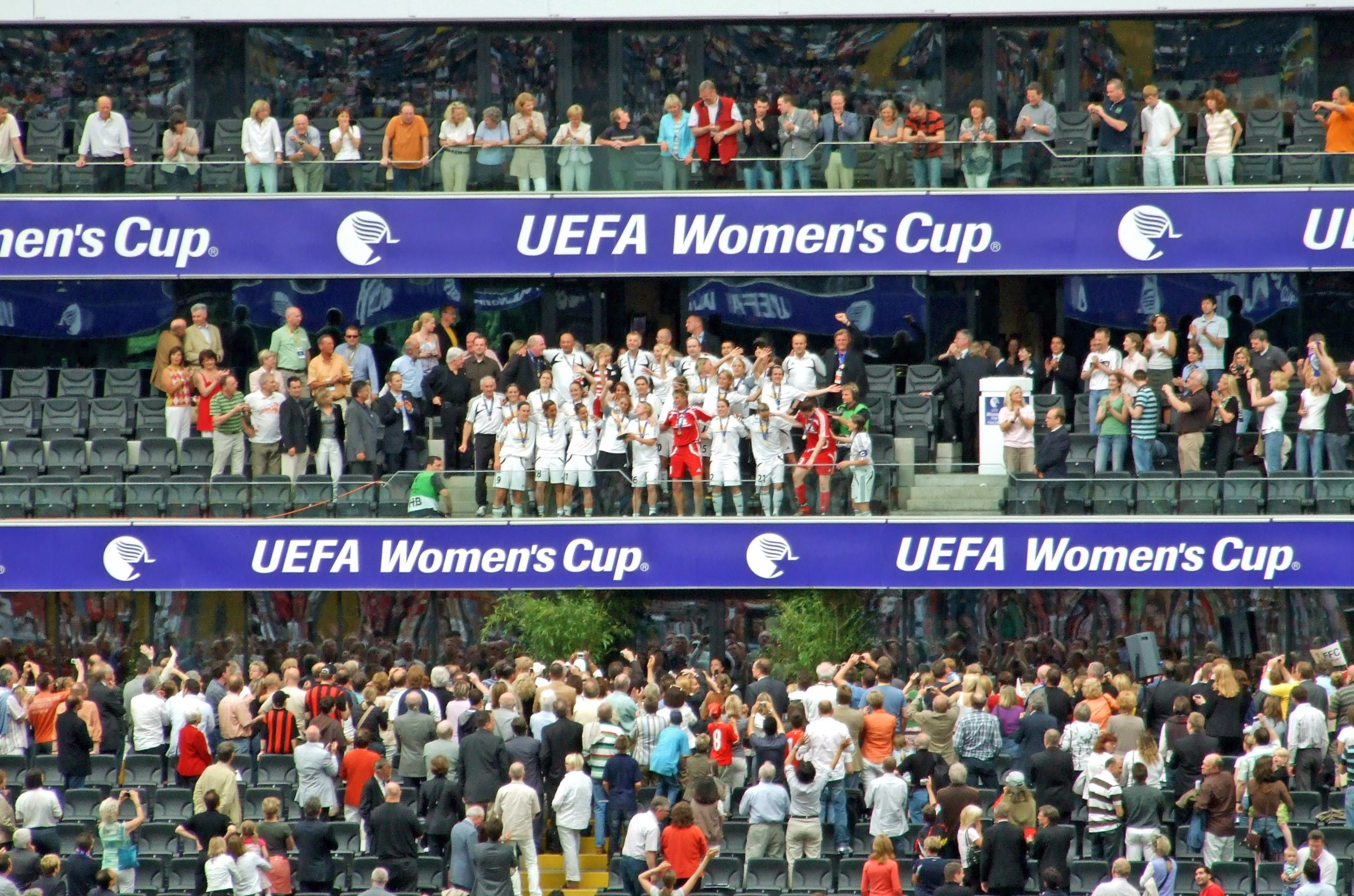
The UEFA Women's Cup in the hands of the players

- Frauen-Bundesliga
  - Winners (7): 1998–99, 2000–01, 2001–02, 2002–03, 2004–05, 2006–07, 2007–08 (record)
- DFB-Pokal Frauen
  - Winners (9): 1998–99, 1999–2000, 2000–01, 2001–02, 2002–03, 2006–07, 2007–08, 2010–11, 2013–14
- UEFA Women's Cup / UEFA Women's Champions League
  - Winners (4): 2001–02, 2005–06, 2007–08, 2014–15
- DFB-Hallenpokal
  - Winners (7): 1997, 1998, 1999, 2002, 2003, 2008, 2012
- Regionalliga Süd
  - Winners (1): 2018
- Hessenliga
  - Winners (2): 2012, 2017
- Hesse Cup
  - Winners (1): 2013, 2019

== Record in UEFA competitions ==
=== UEFA Women's Champions League ===
All results (away, home and aggregate) list the club's goal tally first.

Season	Round	Team	Away	Home	Aggregate
2001–02	Second qualifying round	(Spain) Levante Valencia	–	1–0	–
2001–02	Second qualifying round	(Moldova) Codru Chișinău	–	5–0	–
2001–02	Second qualifying round	(Armenia) College Yerevan	–	18–0	–
2001–02	Quarter-final	(Denmark) Odense	3–0 ^{f}	2–1	5–1
2001–02	Semi-final	(France) Toulouse	2–1 ^{f}	0–0	2–1
2001–02	Final	(Sweden) Umeå	2–0		
2002–03	Second qualifying round	(Serbia) Mašinac Niš (Host)	2–0	–	–
2002–03	Second qualifying round	(Croatia) Osijek	8–0	–	–
2002–03	Second qualifying round	(Republic of Ireland) Shamrock Rovers	7–1	–	–
2002–03	Quarter-final	(Finland) HJK Helsinki	2–0 ^{f}	8–0	10–0
2002–03	Semi-final	(Sweden) Umeå	1–1 ^{f}	1–1 a.e.t. (6–7p)	2–2
2003–04	Second qualifying round	(Portugal) Sintra	4–0	–	–
2003–04	Second qualifying round	(Austria) Neulengbach	7–1	–	–
2003–04	Second qualifying round	(Spain) Athletic Bilbao (Host)	8–1	–	–
2003–04	Quarter-final	(England) Fulham	4–1	3–1 ^{f}	7–2
2003–04	Semi-final	(Sweden) Rosengård Malmö	0–0 ^{f}	4–1	4–1
2003–04	Final	(Sweden) Umeå	0–3 ^{f}	0–5	0–8
2005–06	Second qualifying round	(Switzerland) Luzern (Host)	4–0	–	–
2005–06	Second qualifying round	(Czech Republic) Sparta Prague	1–1	–	–
2005–06	Second qualifying round	(Azerbaijan) Gömrükçü Baku	11–1	–	–
2005–06	Quarter-final	(England) Arsenal	1–1 ^{f}	3–1	4–2
2005–06	Semi-final	(France) Montpellier	3–2	0–1 ^{f}	3–3 (agr)
2005–06	Final	(Germany) Turbine Potsdam	4–0 ^{f}	3–2	7–2
2006–07	Second qualifying round	(Belarus) Universitet Vitebsk	5–0	–	–
2006–07	Second qualifying round	(Iceland) Breiðablik Kópavogur	5–0	–	–
2006–07	Second qualifying round	(Finland) HJK Helsinki (Host)	2–0	–	–
2006–07	Quarter-final	(Norway) Kolbotn	1–2 ^{f}	3–2	4–4 (agr)
2007–08	Second qualifying round	(Iceland) Valur Reykjavík	3–1	–	–
2007–08	Second qualifying round	(England) Everton	2–1	–	–
2007–08	Second qualifying round	(Belgium) Rapide Wezemaal (Host)	1–1	–	–
2007–08	Quarter-final	(Russia) Rossiyanka Khimki	0–0 ^{f}	2–1	2–1
2007–08	Semi-final	(Italy) Verona	3–0	4–2 ^{f}	7–2
2007–08	Final	(Sweden) Umeå	1–1 ^{f}	3–2	4–3
2008–09	Second qualifying round	(Russia) Zvezda Perm	0–1	–	–
2008–09	Second qualifying round	(Norway) Røa Oslo (Host)	3–1	–	–
2008–09	Second qualifying round	(Scotland) Glasgow City	3–1	–	–
2008–09	Quarter-final	(Germany) Duisburg	0–2	1–3 ^{f}	1–5
2011–12	Round of 32	(Norway) Stabæk Bærum	0–1 ^{f}	4–1	4–2
2011–12	Round of 16	(France) Paris Saint-Germain	1–2	3–0 ^{f}	4–2
2011–12	Quarter-final	(Sweden) Rosengård Malmö	0–1 ^{f}	3–0	3–1
2011–12	Semi-final	(England) Arsenal	2–1 ^{f}	2–0	4–1
2011–12	Final	(France) Olympique Lyon	0–2		
2014–15	Round of 32	(Kazakhstan) Kazygurt Shymkent	2–2 ^{f}	4–0	6–2
2014–15	Round of 16	(Italy) Torres Sassari	4–0	5–0 ^{f}	9–0
2014–15	Quarter-final	(England) Bristol City	5–0 ^{f}	7–0	12–0
2014–15	Semi-final	(Denmark) Brøndby	6–0	7–0 ^{f}	13–0
2014–15	Final	(France) Paris Saint-Germain	2–1		
2015–16	Round of 32	(Belgium) Standard Liège	2–0 ^{f}	6–0	8–0
2015–16	Round of 16	(Norway) Lillestrøm	2–0 ^{f}	0–2 a.e.t. (5–4p)	2–2
2015–16	Quarter-final	(Sweden) Rosengård Malmö	1–0 ^{f}	0–1 a.e.t. (5–4p)	1–1
2015–16	Semi-final	(Germany) VfL Wolfsburg	0–4 ^{f}	1–0	1–4
2022–23	Qualifying round 1 SF	(Denmark) Fortuna Hjørring	2–0		
2022–23	Qualifying round 1 F	(Netherlands) Ajax	1–2		
2023–24	Qualifying round 1 SF	(Czech Republic) Slovácko	1–0		
2023–24	Qualifying round 1 F	(Italy) Juventus	1–1 a.e.t. (5–4p)		
2023–24	Qualifying round 2	(Czech Republic) Sparta Prague	5–0 ^{f}	3–0	8–0
2023–24	Group stage	(Spain) Barcelona	0–2	1–3 ^{f}	3rd
2023–24	Group stage	(Portugal) Benfica	0–1 ^{f}	1–1	3rd
2023–24	Group stage	(Sweden) Rosengård	2–1 ^{f}	5–0	3rd
2024–25	Qualifying round 1 SF	(Portugal) Sporting CP	0–2		
2024–25	Qualifying round 1 3rd	(Belarus) FC Minsk	6–0		
2025–26	Qualifying round 3	(Spain) Real Madrid	0–3	1–2 ^{f}	1–5
2026–27	Qualifying round 2 SF	(Cyprus) Omonia	8–0		
2026–27	Qualifying round 2 F	(Sweden) Malmö FF	2–0		
2026–27	Qualifying round 3	(France) Paris Saint-Germain	1–5 a.e.t.	1–1^{f}	2–6

^{f} First leg.

=== UEFA Women's Europa Cup ===
All results (away, home and aggregate) list the club's goal tally first.

Season	Round	Team	Away	Home	Aggregate
2025–26	Second qualifying round	(Czech Republic) Slovácko	1–0	4–0 ^{f}	5–0
2025–26	Round of 16	(Netherlands) PSV Eindhoven	2–1 ^{f}	3–1	5–2
2025–26	Quarter-finals	(Denmark) Nordsjælland	3–2	4–0 ^{f}	7–2
2025–26	Semi-finals	(Sweden) BK Häcken	1–0	0–3 ^{f}	1–3
2026–27	Second qualifying round	(Iceland) FH	1–0^{f}	4–1	5–1
2026–27	Round of 16	(Netherlands) PSV Eindhoven	2–0^{f}	2–1	4–1
2026–27	Quarter-finals	(Spain) Real Sociedad		^{f}	

^{f} First leg.
