= Stadion am Brentanobad =

Multi-use stadium in Frankfurt

Coordinates: 50°07′30″N 8°37′16″E

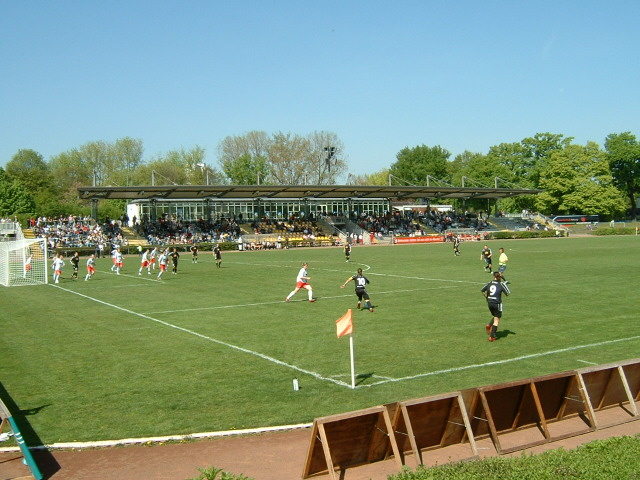
Stadion am Brentanobad

Stadion am Brentanobad is a multi-use stadium in Frankfurt, Germany. It is currently used mostly for football matches and is the home stadium of Eintracht Frankfurt's women's team and Rot-Weiß Frankfurt. The stadium has a capacity of 5,500.
