= German women's football league system =

- Country: Germany
- Sport: Women's football
- Promotion and relegation: Yes

National system
- Federation: German Football Federation
- Confederation: UEFA
- Top division: Frauen-Bundesliga
- Second division: 2. Frauen-Bundesliga
- Cup competition: Women's DFB Cup

The German women's football league system looks like the following. On lower than its top 4 levels there are several levels of local leagues.

Level	League(s)/Division(s)				
I	Frauen-Bundesliga; 14 clubs				
II	2. Frauen-Bundesliga; 14 clubs				
III	Regionalliga Nord; 12 clubs	Regionalliga Nordost; 12 clubs	Regionalliga West; 14 clubs	Regionalliga Südwest; 12 clubs	Regionalliga Süd; 13 clubs
IV	Oberliga Niedersachsen Ost; Oberliga Niedersachsen West; Verbandsliga Bremen; Verbandsliga Hamburg; Oberliga Schleswig-Holstein	Landesliga Sachsen; Landesliga Sachsen-Anhalt; Verbandsliga Berlin; Verbandsliga Brandenburg; Verbandsliga Mecklenburg-Vorpommern; Verbandsliga Thüringen	Verbandsliga Mittelrhein; Verbandsliga Niederrhein; Verbandsliga Westfalen	Verbandsliga Rheinland; Verbandsliga Saarland; Verbandsliga Südwest	Bayernliga; Oberliga Baden-Württemberg; Oberliga Hessen
V	Landesliga Niedersachsen; Landesliga Bremen; Landesliga Hamburg; Verbandsliga Schleswig-Holstein	Landesklasse Sachsen; Landesklasse Thüringen; Landesliga Berlin; Landesliga Brandenburg; Kreisoberliga Mecklenburg-Vorpommern; Regionalklasse Sachsen-Anhalt	Landesliga Mittelrhein; Landesliga Niederrhein; Landesliga Westfalen	Bezirksliga Rheinland; Landesliga Saarland; Landesliga Südwest	Landesliga Bayern; Verbandsliga Baden; Verbandsliga Südbaden; Verbandsliga Hessen; Verbandsliga Württemberg
VI	Bezirksliga Niedersachsen; Bezirksliga Bremen; Bezirksliga Hamburg; Kreisliga Schleswig-Holstein	Kreisoberliga Sachsen; Kreisoberliga Thüringen; Bezirksliga Berlin; Kreisliga Brandenburg; Kreisliga Mecklenburg-Vorpommern; Kreisliga Sachsen-Anhalt	Bezirksliga Mittelrhein; Bezirksliga Niederrhein; Bezirksliga Westfalen	Kreisklasse Rheinland; Bezirksliga Saarland; Bezirksliga Südwest	Bezirksoberliga Bayern; Landesliga Baden; Bezirksliga Südbaden; Gruppenliga Hessen; Landesliga Württemberg
VII	Kreisliga Niedersachsen; Stadtliga Bremen; Kreisliga Hamburg; Kreisklasse A Schleswig-Holstein	Kreisliga Sachsen; Kreisliga Thüringen; 1. Kreisklasse Brandenburg; 1. Kreisklasse Sachsen-Anhalt	Kreisliga Mittelrhein; Kreisliga Niederrhein; Kreisliga A Westfalen	Bezirksklasse Saarland	Bezirksliga Bayern; Kreisliga Baden; 1. Kreisliga Südbaden; Kreisoberliga Hessen; Regionenliga Württemberg
VIII	1. Kreisklasse Niedersachsen	1. Kreisklasse Sachsen	Kreisliga B Westfalen		Kreisliga Bayern; 2. Kreisliga Südbaden; Kreisliga A Hessen; Bezirksliga Württemberg
IX	2. Kreisklasse Niedersachsen	2. Kreisklasse Sachsen			Kreisklasse Bayern; Kreisliga B Hessen; Kreisliga Württemberg
X					A-Klasse Bayern

Source:"German football leagues". Fussball.de.

- All leagues on same level run parallel.

== See also ==
- Football in Germany
- Women's football in Germany
