= Niko Arnautis =

German–Greek football manager

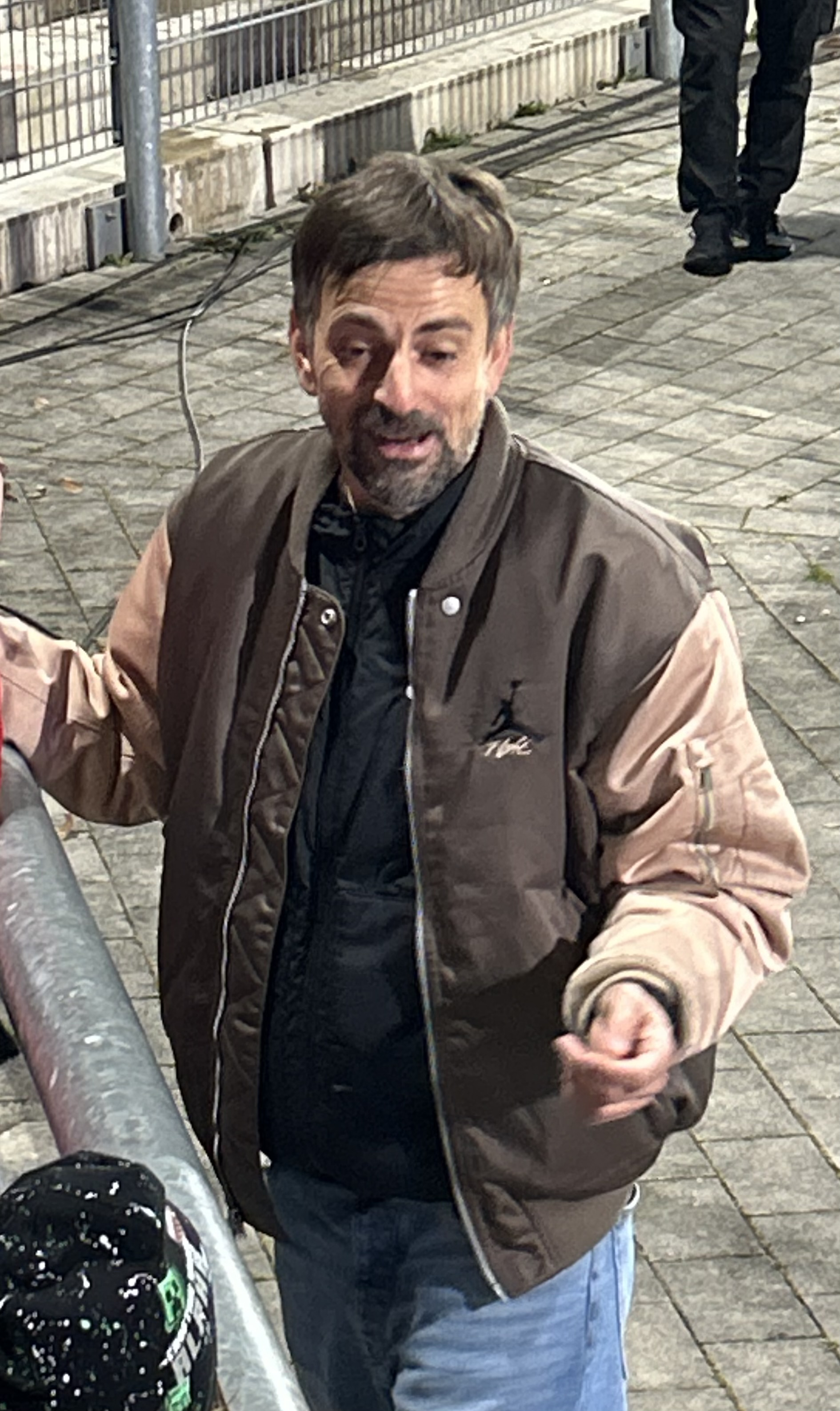
- Arnautis pictured in 2025

Personal information
- Full name: Nikolaos Arnautis
- Date of birth: 1 April 1980 (age 46)
- Place of birth: Frankfurt am Main, Germany
- Position: Midfielder

Team information
- Current team: Eintracht Frankfurt (women)

Youth career
- SV Hattersheim
- Rot-Weiss Frankfurt

Senior career*
Years	Team	Apps	(Gls)
1998–2007	Rot-Weiss Frankfurt		
2007–2012	VfB Unterliederbach		
2012–2014	Rot-Weiss Frankfurt		

Managerial career
- 2014: Rot-Weiss Frankfurt (player–coach)
- 2015: Rot-Weiss Frankfurt (caretaker)
- 2016–2017: 1. FFC Frankfurt II
- 2017–2020: 1. FFC Frankfurt
- 2020–: Eintracht Frankfurt (women)
- * Club domestic league appearances and goals as of 25 March 2026

Niko Arnautis is a German–Greek football manager who is currently the head coach of Eintracht Frankfurt women's team.

== Coaching career ==
Arnautis became the head coach of Eintracht Frankfurt women's team on 1 July 2020.

== Coaching record ==
As of match played on 25 March 2026

Team	From	To	Record					Ref.
Team	From	To	M	W	D	L	Win %	Ref.
Rot-Weiss Frankfurt	21 May 2015	30 June 2015	3	1	2	0	33.33	
1. FFC Frankfurt II	1 July 2016	28 September 2017	25	9	6	10	36.00	
1. FFC Frankfurt	29 September 2017	30 June 2020	71	33	8	30	46.48	
Eintracht Frankfurt (women)	1 July 2020	present	196	120	20	56	61.22	

== Honours ==
=== Player ===
RW Frankfurt

- Bezirksoberliga Frankfurt: 2000–01
