= Katharina Kiel =

German association football player

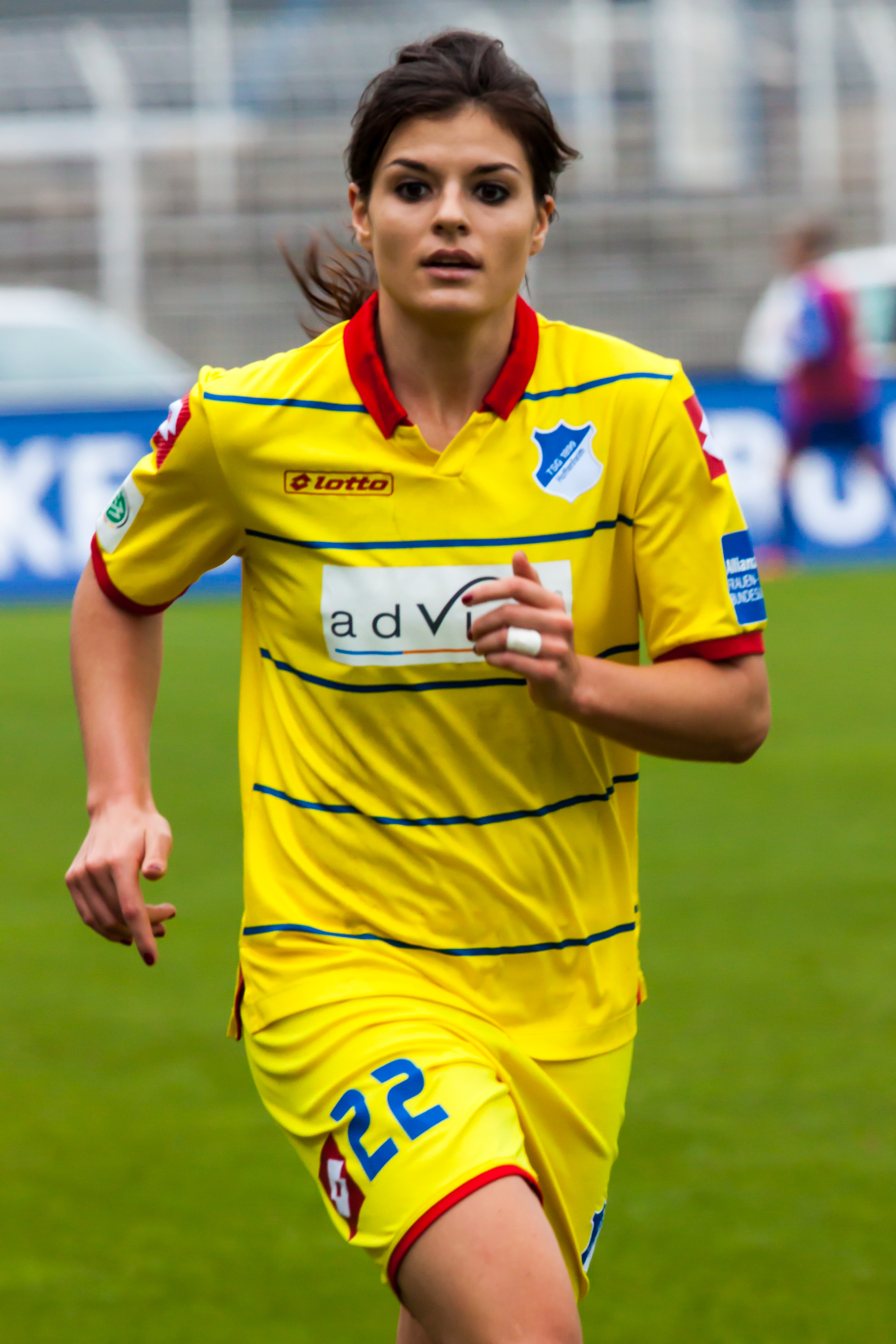

Personal information
- Date of birth: 2 May 1992 (age 34)
- Place of birth: Northeim, Germany
- Height: 1.75 m (5 ft 9 in)
- Position: Midfielder

Katharina Kiel (born 2 May 1992) is a German former professional footballer who played as a midfielder for TSG 1899 Hoffenheim.
